= Leme =

Leme may refer to the following places:

== Brazil ==
- Leme, Rio de Janeiro, neighborhood in Rio de Janeiro
- Leme, São Paulo, municipality in the state of São Paulo

== France ==
- Lème, commune in the Pyrénées-Atlantiques department
- Lemé, commune in the Aisne department

== See also ==
- Lim (Croatia), a watercourse whose Italian name is Canale di Leme
- Fernanda Paes Leme (born 1983) Brazilian actress
- Shirley Paes Leme (born 1955) Brazilian visual artist
