= Clarac =

Clarac may refer to the following places in France:

- Clarac, Haute-Garonne, a commune in the Haute-Garonne department
- Clarac, Hautes-Pyrénées, a commune in the Hautes-Pyrénées department
- Clarac (Pyrénées-Atlantiques), a former commune in the Pyrénées-Atlantiques department

== See also ==
- Charles Othon Frédéric Jean-Baptiste de Clarac (1777–1847), French artist, scholar and archaeologist
- Claracq, a commune in the Pyrénées-Atlantiques department in south-western France
