= Montardon =

- Commune
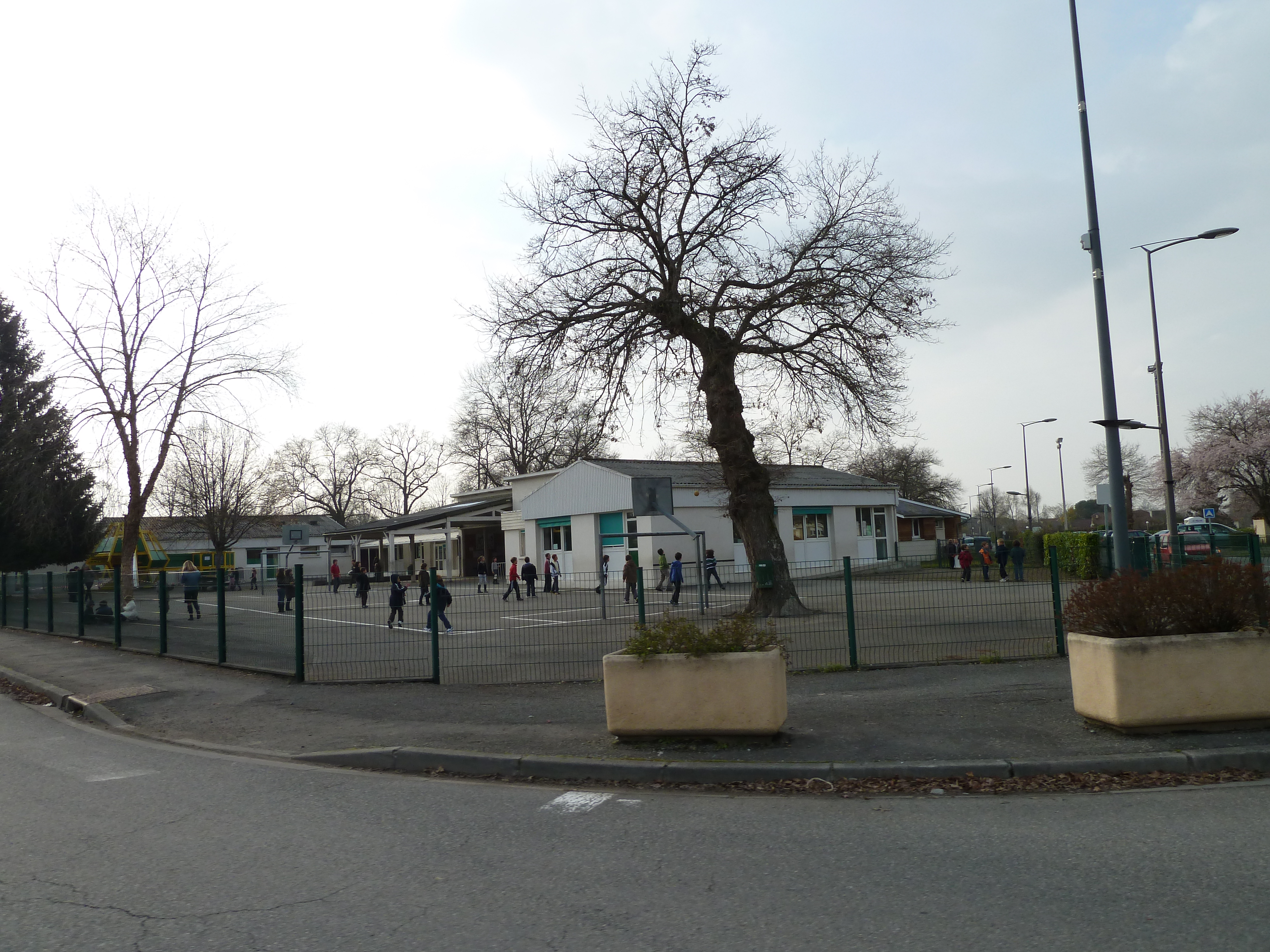
- The school of Montardon
- Location of Montardon
- Location within France Location within Nouvelle-Aquitaine
- Coordinates: 43°22′36″N 0°20′22″W
- Country: France
- Region: Nouvelle-Aquitaine
- Department: Pyrénées-Atlantiques
- Arrondissement: Pau
- Canton: Terres des Luys et Coteaux du Vic-Bilh
- Intercommunality: Luys en Béarn

Government
  - Mayor (2020–2026): Stéphane Bonnasiolle
- Area^{1}: 8.42 km^{2} (3.25 sq mi)
- Elevation: 219 m (719 ft)
- Highest elevation: 295 m (968 ft)
- Lowest elevation: 194 m (636 ft)
- Population (2023): 2,419
  - Density: 287/km^{2} (744/sq mi)
- Time zone: UTC+01:00 (CET)
  - Summer (DST): UTC+02:00 (CEST)
- INSEE/Postal code: 64399 /64121
- ^{1} French Land Register data, which excludes lakes, ponds, glaciers > 1 km^{2} (0.386 sq mi or 247 acres) and river estuaries.

Montardon (French pronunciation: [mɔ̃taʁdɔ̃]) is a commune in the Pyrénées-Atlantiques department in south-western France.

Montardon offers several sports facilities: a tennis and a basketball playgrounds.

== Population ==
Historical population
Year	Pop.	±% p.a.
1968	369	—
1975	650	+8.42%
1982	1,130	+8.22%
1990	1,437	+3.05%
1999	1,836	+2.76%
2007	2,166	+2.09%
2012	2,343	+1.58%
2017	2,300	−0.37%
2023	2,419	+0.84%
Source: INSEE

== See also ==
- Communes of the Pyrénées-Atlantiques department
