= Coslédaà-Lube-Boast =

- Commune
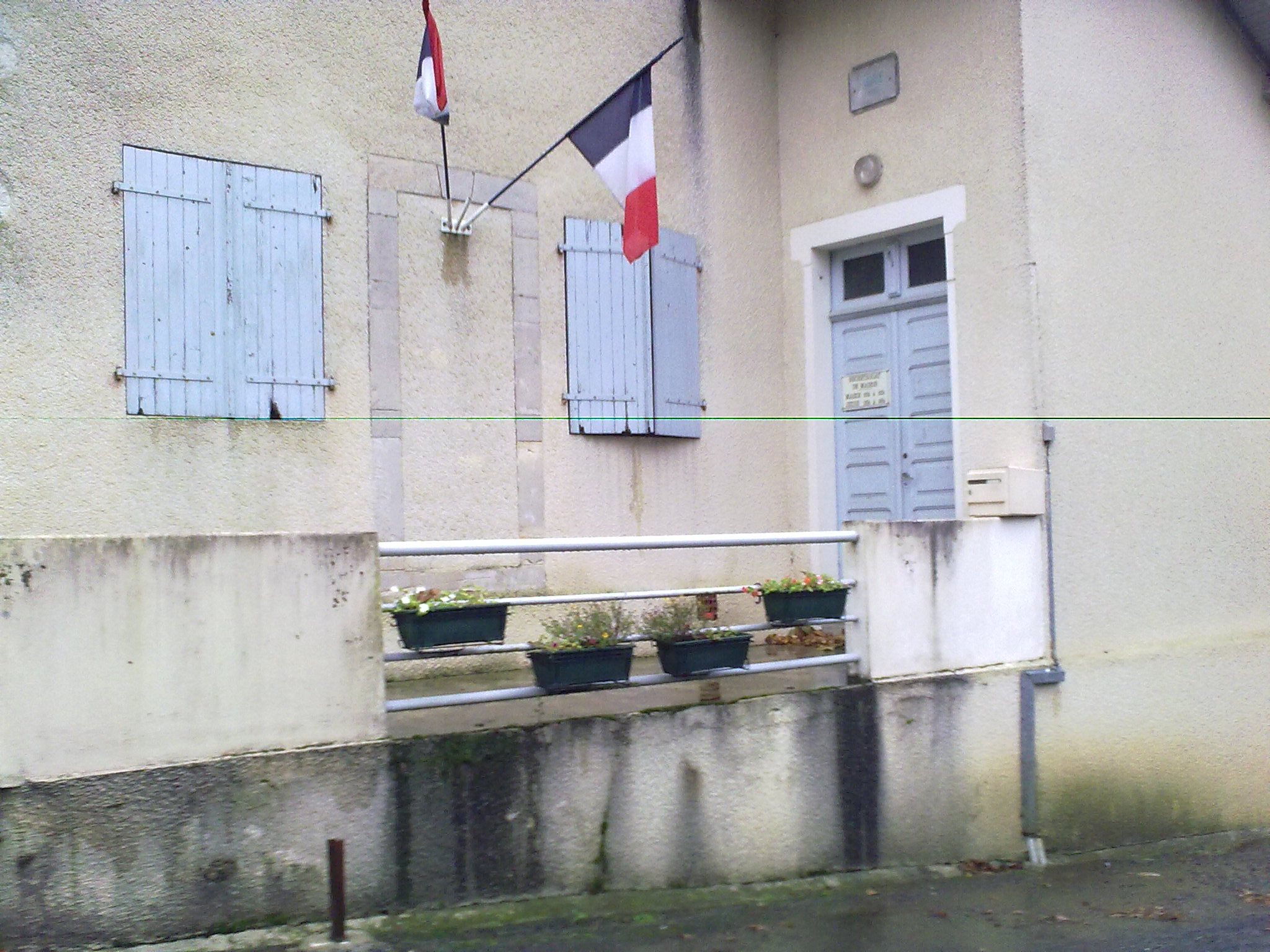
- The town hall of Coslédaà-Lube-Boast
- Location of Coslédaà-Lube-Boast
- Location within France Location within Nouvelle-Aquitaine
- Coordinates: 43°27′35″N 0°14′03″W
- Country: France
- Region: Nouvelle-Aquitaine
- Department: Pyrénées-Atlantiques
- Arrondissement: Pau
- Canton: Terres des Luys et Coteaux du Vic-Bilh
- Intercommunality: Nord-Est Béarn

Government
  - Mayor (2020–2026): Pascal Bourguinat
- Area^{1}: 13.92 km^{2} (5.37 sq mi)
- Elevation: 268 m (879 ft)
- Highest elevation: 316 m (1,037 ft)
- Lowest elevation: 191 m (627 ft)
- Population (2023): 374
  - Density: 26.9/km^{2} (69.6/sq mi)
- Time zone: UTC+01:00 (CET)
  - Summer (DST): UTC+02:00 (CEST)
- INSEE/Postal code: 64194 /64160
- ^{1} French Land Register data, which excludes lakes, ponds, glaciers > 1 km^{2} (0.386 sq mi or 247 acres) and river estuaries.

Coslédaà-Lube-Boast (Occitan: Còuledan, Lube e Boast) is a commune in the Pyrénées-Atlantiques department in south-western France.

== See also ==
- Communes of the Pyrénées-Atlantiques department
