= Pouliacq =

- Commune
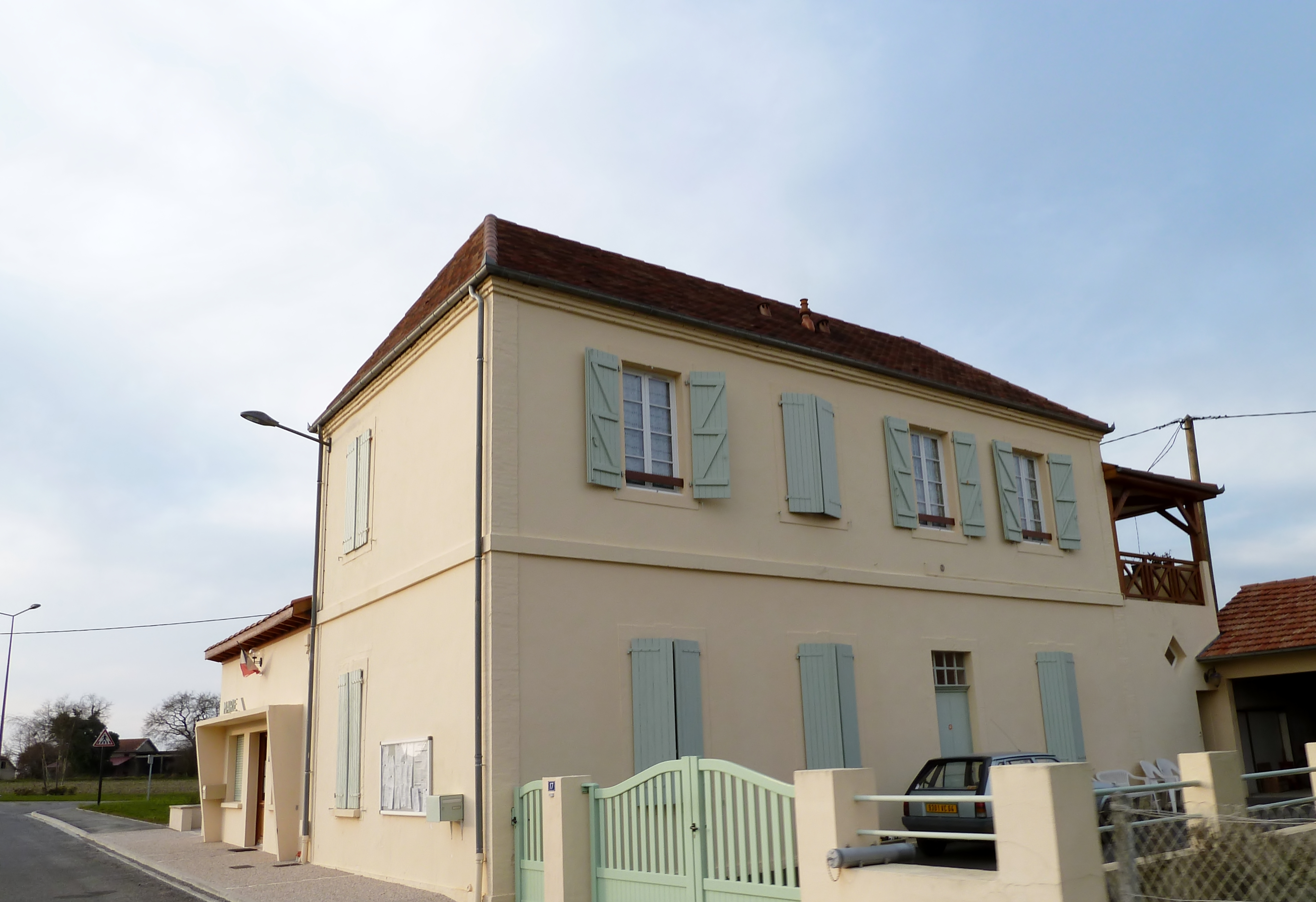
- Town Hall
- Location of Pouliacq
- Location within France Location within Nouvelle-Aquitaine
- Coordinates: 43°31′38″N 0°21′14″W
- Country: France
- Region: Nouvelle-Aquitaine
- Department: Pyrénées-Atlantiques
- Arrondissement: Pau
- Canton: Terres des Luys et Coteaux du Vic-Bilh
- Intercommunality: Luys en Béarn

Government
  - Mayor (2020–2026): Pierre Dupouy-Bas
- Area^{1}: 3.41 km^{2} (1.32 sq mi)
- Elevation: 136 m (446 ft)
- Highest elevation: 208 m (682 ft)
- Lowest elevation: 129 m (423 ft)
- Population (2023): 49
  - Density: 14/km^{2} (37/sq mi)
- Time zone: UTC+01:00 (CET)
  - Summer (DST): UTC+02:00 (CEST)
- INSEE/Postal code: 64456 /64410
- ^{1} French Land Register data, which excludes lakes, ponds, glaciers > 1 km^{2} (0.386 sq mi or 247 acres) and river estuaries.

Pouliacq (French pronunciation: [puljak]; Occitan: Poliac) is a commune in the Pyrénées-Atlantiques department in south-western France.

== See also ==
- Communes of the Pyrénées-Atlantiques department
