= Lasclaveries =

- Commune
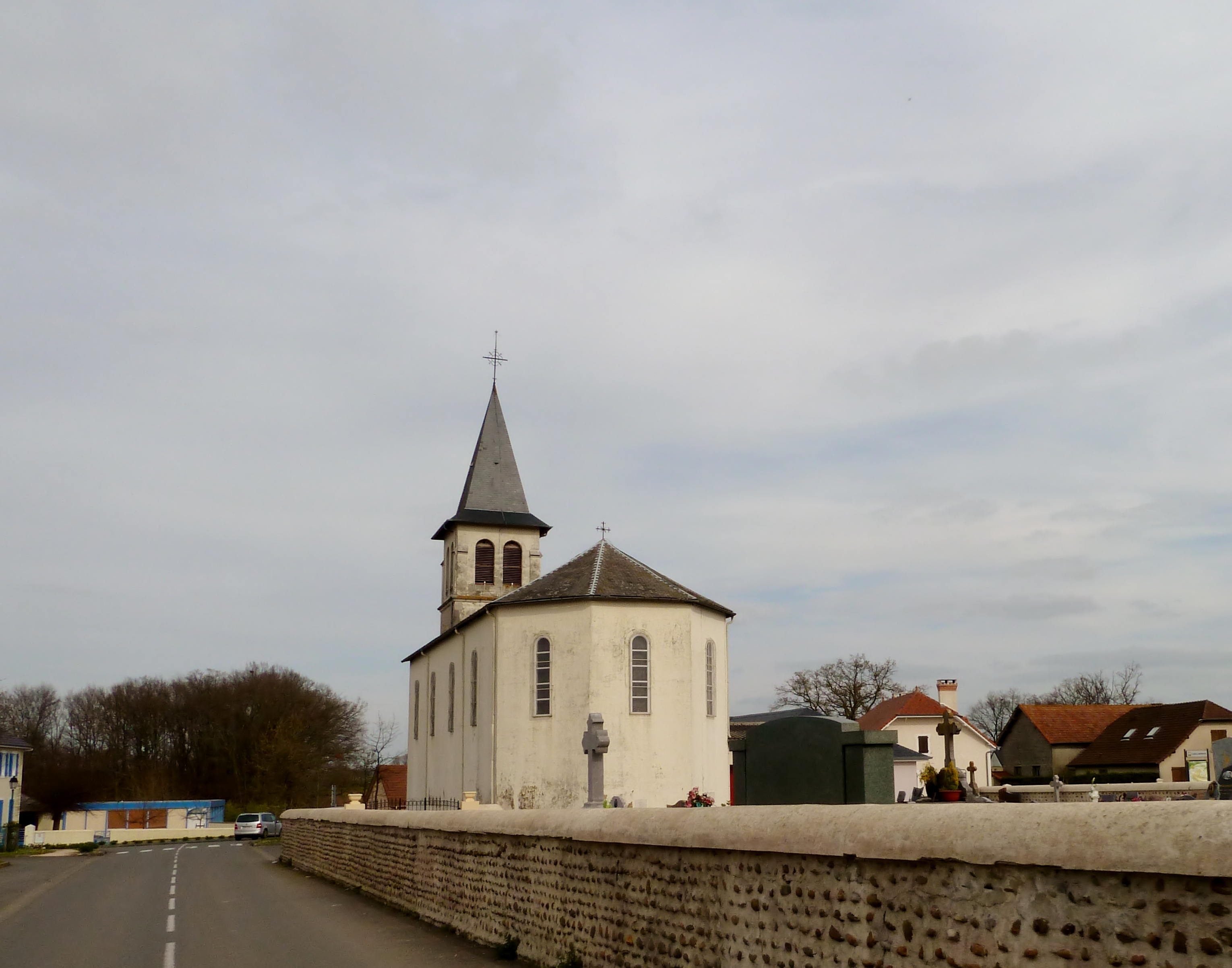
- The church of Lasclaveries
- Location of Lasclaveries
- Location within France Location within Nouvelle-Aquitaine
- Coordinates: 43°26′15″N 0°17′23″W
- Country: France
- Region: Nouvelle-Aquitaine
- Department: Pyrénées-Atlantiques
- Arrondissement: Pau
- Canton: Terres des Luys et Coteaux du Vic-Bilh
- Intercommunality: Luys en Béarn

Government
  - Mayor (2020–2026): Frédéric Larréché
- Area^{1}: 6.13 km^{2} (2.37 sq mi)
- Elevation: 253 m (830 ft)
- Highest elevation: 264 m (866 ft)
- Lowest elevation: 171 m (561 ft)
- Population (2023): 246
  - Density: 40.1/km^{2} (104/sq mi)
- Time zone: UTC+01:00 (CET)
  - Summer (DST): UTC+02:00 (CEST)
- INSEE/Postal code: 64321 /64450
- ^{1} French Land Register data, which excludes lakes, ponds, glaciers > 1 km^{2} (0.386 sq mi or 247 acres) and river estuaries.

Lasclaveries (French pronunciation: [lasklavʁi]; Occitan: Las Claverias) is a commune in the Pyrénées-Atlantiques department in south-western France.

== See also ==
- Communes of the Pyrénées-Atlantiques department
