= Navailles-Angos =

- Commune
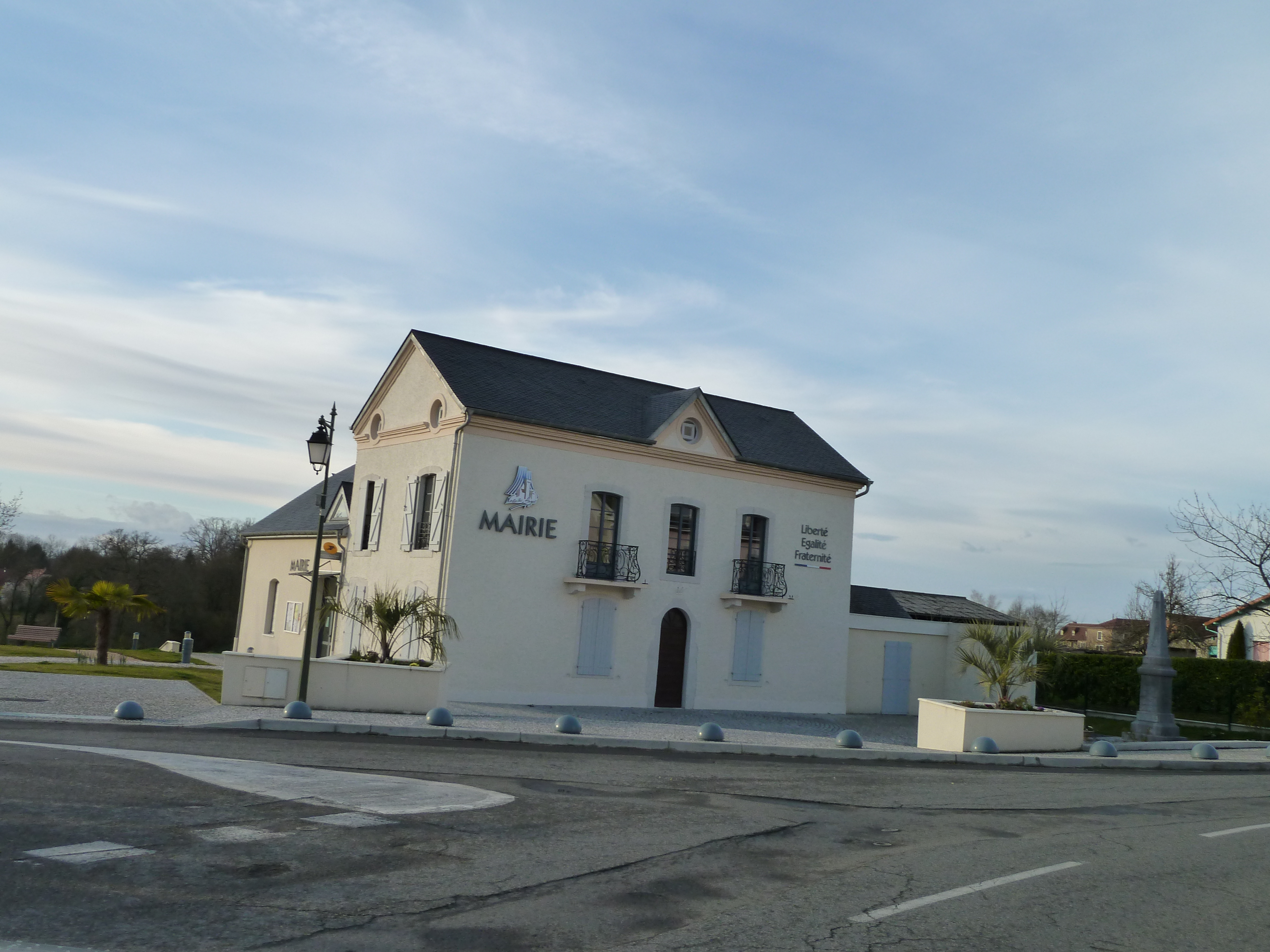
- The town hall of Navailles-Angos
- Location of Navailles-Angos
- Location within France Location within Nouvelle-Aquitaine
- Coordinates: 43°24′53″N 0°20′28″W
- Country: France
- Region: Nouvelle-Aquitaine
- Department: Pyrénées-Atlantiques
- Arrondissement: Pau
- Canton: Terres des Luys et Coteaux du Vic-Bilh
- Intercommunality: Luys en Béarn

Government
  - Mayor (2020–2026): Jeannine Lavie-Hourcade
- Area^{1}: 14.22 km^{2} (5.49 sq mi)
- Elevation: 375 m (1,230 ft)
- Highest elevation: 302 m (991 ft)
- Lowest elevation: 167 m (548 ft)
- Population (2023): 1,545
  - Density: 108.6/km^{2} (281.4/sq mi)
- Time zone: UTC+01:00 (CET)
  - Summer (DST): UTC+02:00 (CEST)
- INSEE/Postal code: 64415 /64450
- ^{1} French Land Register data, which excludes lakes, ponds, glaciers > 1 km^{2} (0.386 sq mi or 247 acres) and river estuaries.

Navailles-Angos (French pronunciation: [navaj ɑ̃ɡɔs]; Occitan: Navalhas e Angòs) is a commune in the Pyrénées-Atlantiques department and Nouvelle-Aquitaine region of south-western France. It was formed the 8 May 1845 by the merge of Navailles and Angos

== See also ==
- Communes of the Pyrénées-Atlantiques department
