= Sévignacq =

- Commune
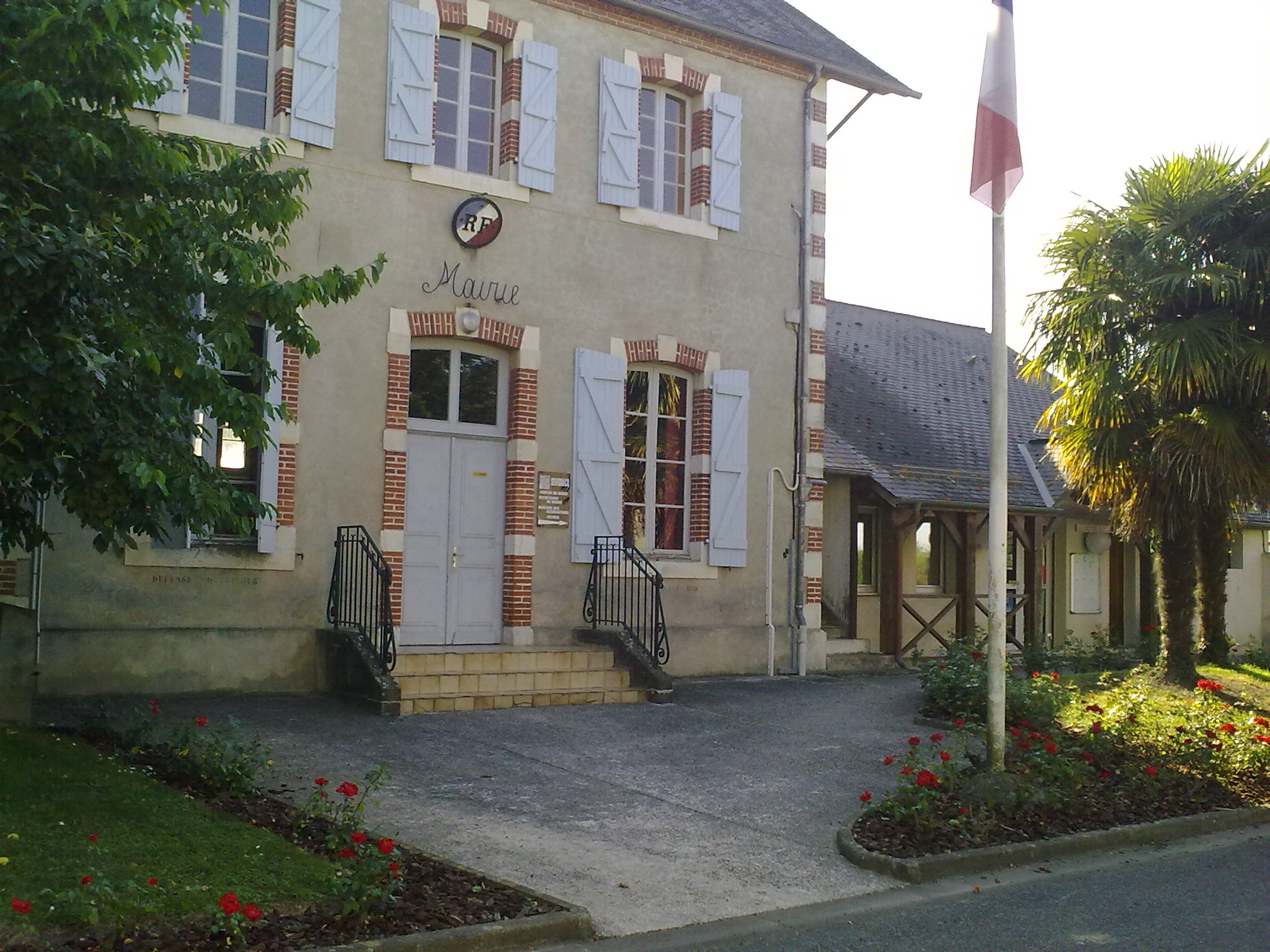
- Town Hall
- Location of Sévignacq
- Location within France Location within Nouvelle-Aquitaine
- Coordinates: 43°26′33″N 0°15′40″W
- Country: France
- Region: Nouvelle-Aquitaine
- Department: Pyrénées-Atlantiques
- Arrondissement: Pau
- Canton: Terres des Luys et Coteaux du Vic-Bilh
- Intercommunality: Luys en Béarn

Government
  - Mayor (2020–2026): Michel Cuyaubé
- Area^{1}: 17.43 km^{2} (6.73 sq mi)
- Elevation: 252 m (827 ft)
- Highest elevation: 282 m (925 ft)
- Lowest elevation: 179 m (587 ft)
- Population (2023): 805
  - Density: 46.2/km^{2} (120/sq mi)
- Time zone: UTC+01:00 (CET)
  - Summer (DST): UTC+02:00 (CEST)
- INSEE/Postal code: 64523 /64160
- ^{1} French Land Register data, which excludes lakes, ponds, glaciers > 1 km^{2} (0.386 sq mi or 247 acres) and river estuaries.

Sévignacq (French pronunciation: [seviɲak]; Occitan: Sevinhac, before 1989: Sévignacq-Thèze) is a commune in the Pyrénées-Atlantiques department in south-western France.

== See also ==
- Communes of the Pyrénées-Atlantiques department
