= Mascaraàs-Haron =

- Commune
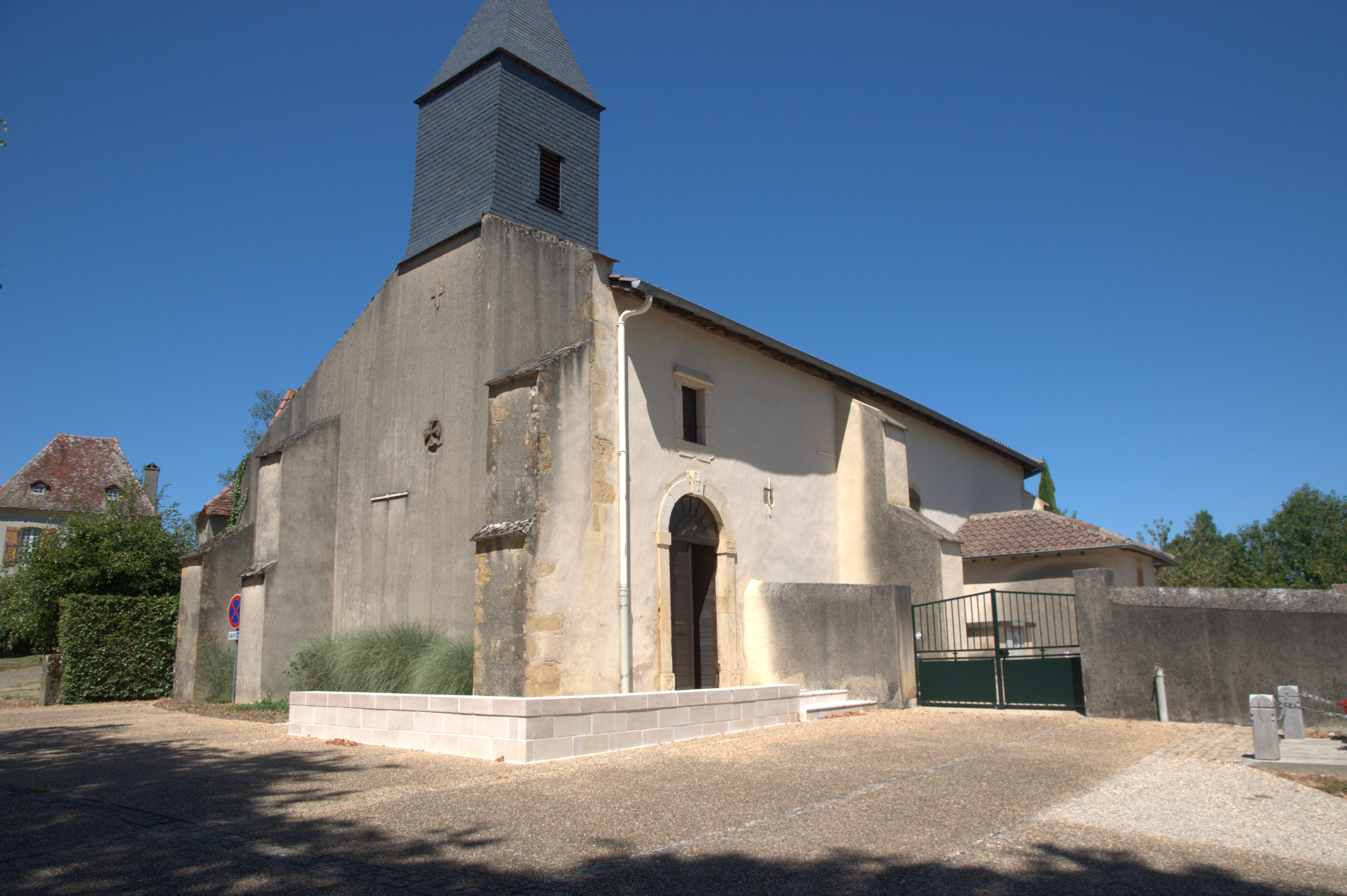
- The church of Mascaraàs
- Location of Mascaraàs-Haron
- Location within France Location within Nouvelle-Aquitaine
- Coordinates: 43°32′28″N 0°13′21″W
- Country: France
- Region: Nouvelle-Aquitaine
- Department: Pyrénées-Atlantiques
- Arrondissement: Pau
- Canton: Terres des Luys et Coteaux du Vic-Bilh
- Intercommunality: Luys en Béarn

Government
  - Mayor (2020–2026): Carle Martens
- Area^{1}: 8.76 km^{2} (3.38 sq mi)
- Elevation: 169 m (554 ft)
- Highest elevation: 272 m (892 ft)
- Lowest elevation: 130 m (430 ft)
- Population (2023): 109
  - Density: 12.4/km^{2} (32.2/sq mi)
- Time zone: UTC+01:00 (CET)
  - Summer (DST): UTC+02:00 (CEST)
- INSEE/Postal code: 64366 /64330
- ^{1} French Land Register data, which excludes lakes, ponds, glaciers > 1 km^{2} (0.386 sq mi or 247 acres) and river estuaries.

Mascaraàs-Haron (French pronunciation: [maskaʁas aʁɔ̃]) is a commune in the Pyrénées-Atlantiques department in south-western France.

== See also ==
- Communes of the Pyrénées-Atlantiques department
