= Monassut-Audiracq =

- Commune
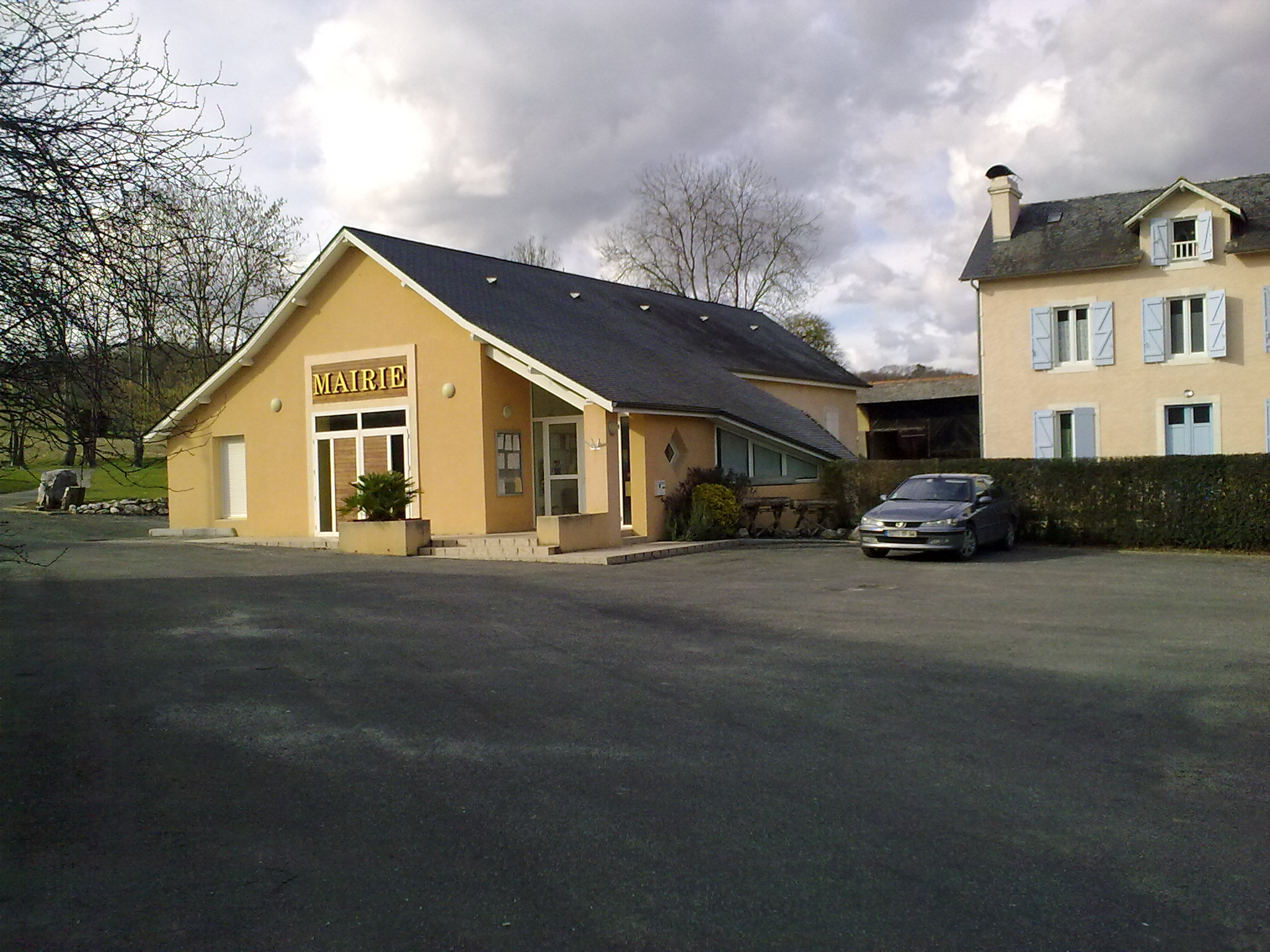
- Town Hall of Monassut-Audiracq
- Location of Monassut-Audiracq
- Location within France Location within Nouvelle-Aquitaine
- Coordinates: 43°25′11″N 0°11′47″W
- Country: France
- Region: Nouvelle-Aquitaine
- Department: Pyrénées-Atlantiques
- Arrondissement: Pau
- Canton: Terres des Luys et Coteaux du Vic-Bilh
- Intercommunality: Nord-Est Béarn

Government
  - Mayor (2020–2026): Francis Lacoste
- Area^{1}: 9.92 km^{2} (3.83 sq mi)
- Elevation: 245 m (804 ft)
- Highest elevation: 329 m (1,079 ft)
- Lowest elevation: 213 m (699 ft)
- Population (2023): 369
  - Density: 37.2/km^{2} (96.3/sq mi)
- Time zone: UTC+01:00 (CET)
  - Summer (DST): UTC+02:00 (CEST)
- INSEE/Postal code: 64389 /64160
- ^{1} French Land Register data, which excludes lakes, ponds, glaciers > 1 km^{2} (0.386 sq mi or 247 acres) and river estuaries.

Monassut-Audiracq is a commune in the Pyrénées-Atlantiques department in south-western France.

== See also ==
- Communes of the Pyrénées-Atlantiques department
