= Vialer =

- Commune
- Location of Vialer
- Location within France Location within Nouvelle-Aquitaine
- Coordinates: 43°30′11″N 0°10′19″W
- Country: France
- Region: Nouvelle-Aquitaine
- Department: Pyrénées-Atlantiques
- Arrondissement: Pau
- Canton: Terres des Luys et Coteaux du Vic-Bilh
- Intercommunality: Luys en Béarn

Government
  - Mayor (2020–2026): Marie-Christine Maillot
- Area^{1}: 7.29 km^{2} (2.81 sq mi)
- Elevation: 220 m (720 ft)
- Highest elevation: 286 m (938 ft)
- Lowest elevation: 138 m (453 ft)
- Population (2023): 144
  - Density: 19.8/km^{2} (51.2/sq mi)
- Time zone: UTC+01:00 (CET)
  - Summer (DST): UTC+02:00 (CEST)
- INSEE/Postal code: 64552 /64330
- ^{1} French Land Register data, which excludes lakes, ponds, glaciers > 1 km^{2} (0.386 sq mi or 247 acres) and river estuaries.

Vialer (French pronunciation: [vjale]; Occitan: Lo Vialèr) is a commune in the Pyrénées-Atlantiques department in south-western France.

== See also ==
- Communes of the Pyrénées-Atlantiques department
