= Burosse-Mendousse =

- Commune
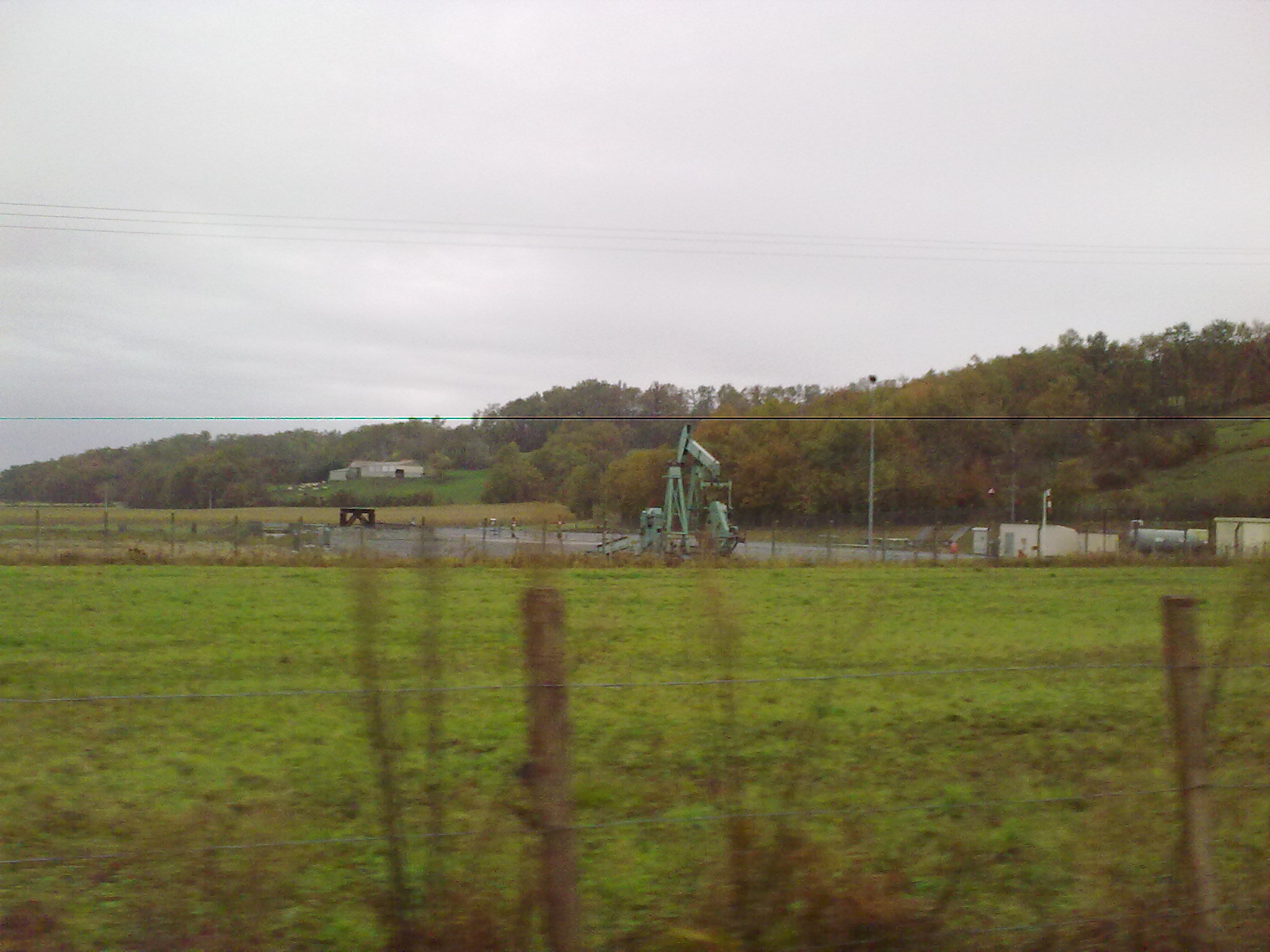
- An oil well in Burosse-Mendousse
- Location of Burosse-Mendousse
- Location within France Location within Nouvelle-Aquitaine
- Coordinates: 43°30′46″N 0°12′38″W
- Country: France
- Region: Nouvelle-Aquitaine
- Department: Pyrénées-Atlantiques
- Arrondissement: Pau
- Canton: Terres des Luys et Coteaux du Vic-Bilh
- Intercommunality: Luys en Béarn

Government
  - Mayor (2025–2026): Pascal Gayas
- Area^{1}: 5.62 km^{2} (2.17 sq mi)
- Elevation: 200 m (660 ft)
- Highest elevation: 283 m (928 ft)
- Lowest elevation: 142 m (466 ft)
- Population (2023): 81
  - Density: 14/km^{2} (37/sq mi)
- Time zone: UTC+01:00 (CET)
  - Summer (DST): UTC+02:00 (CEST)
- INSEE/Postal code: 64153 /64330
- ^{1} French Land Register data, which excludes lakes, ponds, glaciers > 1 km^{2} (0.386 sq mi or 247 acres) and river estuaries.

Burosse-Mendousse is a commune in the Pyrénées-Atlantiques department in southwestern France.

== See also ==
- Communes of the Pyrénées-Atlantiques department
