= Garlède-Mondebat =

- Commune
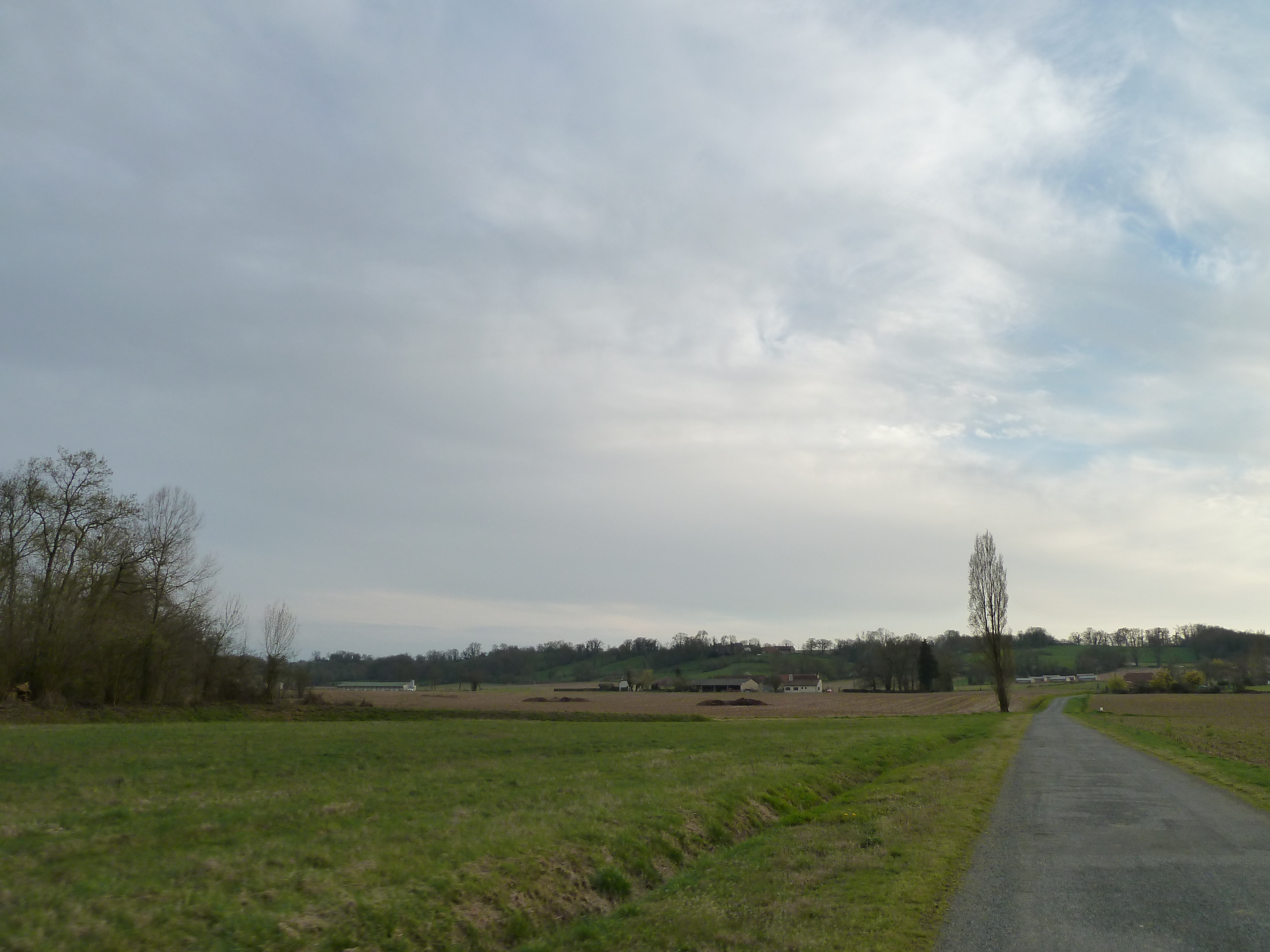
- The surrounding countryside
- Location of Garlède-Mondebat
- Location within France Location within Nouvelle-Aquitaine
- Coordinates: 43°30′09″N 0°19′50″W
- Country: France
- Region: Nouvelle-Aquitaine
- Department: Pyrénées-Atlantiques
- Arrondissement: Pau
- Canton: Terres des Luys et Coteaux du Vic-Bilh
- Intercommunality: Luys en Béarn

Government
  - Mayor (2020–2026): Eric Lafontan
- Area^{1}: 8.65 km^{2} (3.34 sq mi)
- Elevation: 192 m (630 ft)
- Highest elevation: 222 m (728 ft)
- Lowest elevation: 126 m (413 ft)
- Population (2023): 220
  - Density: 25/km^{2} (66/sq mi)
- Time zone: UTC+01:00 (CET)
  - Summer (DST): UTC+02:00 (CEST)
- INSEE/Postal code: 64232 /64450
- ^{1} French Land Register data, which excludes lakes, ponds, glaciers > 1 km^{2} (0.386 sq mi or 247 acres) and river estuaries.

Garlède-Mondebat is a commune in the Pyrénées-Atlantiques department in south-western France.

== See also ==
- Communes of the Pyrénées-Atlantiques department
