= Moncla =

- Commune
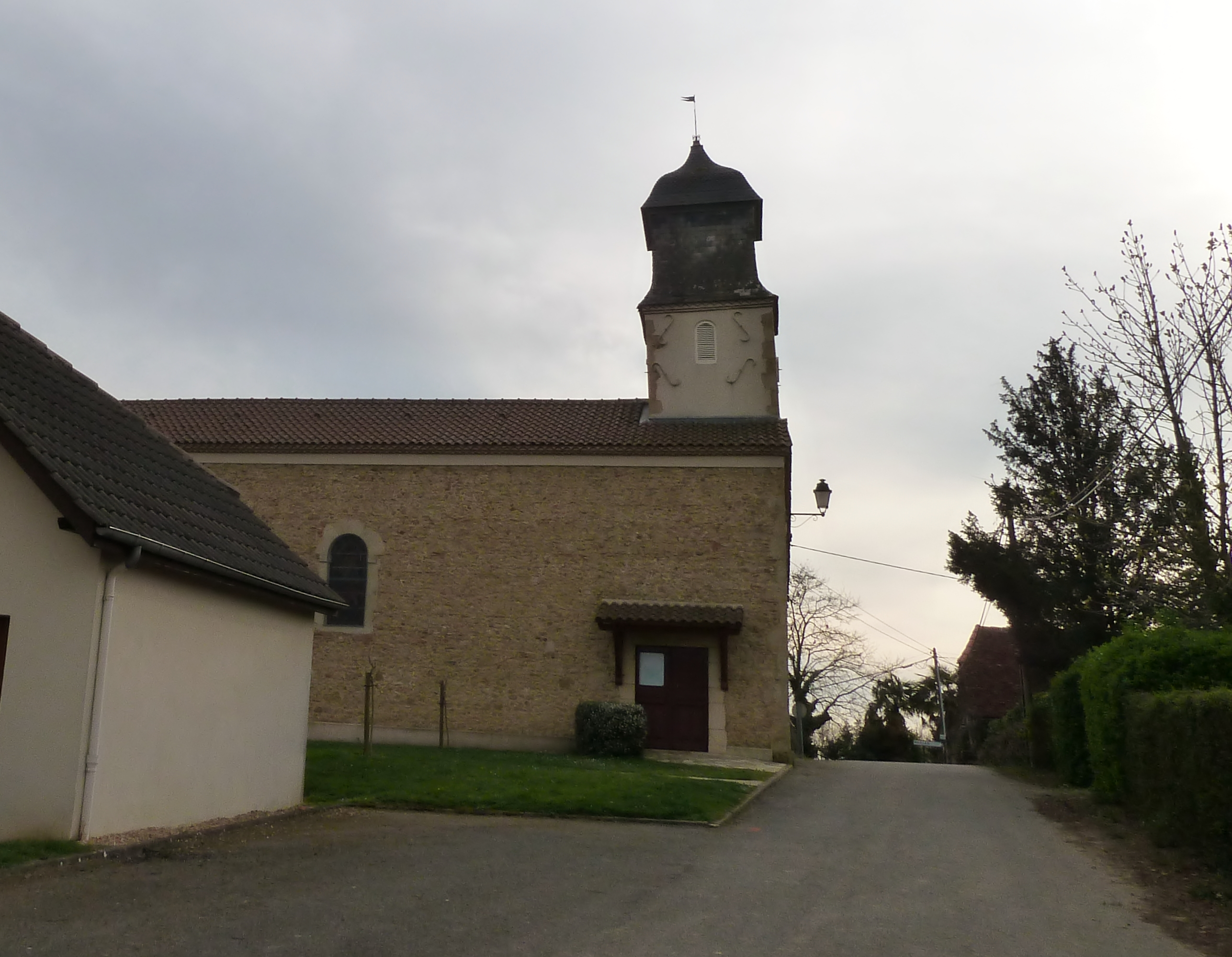
- The church of Moncla
- Location of Moncla
- Location within France Location within Nouvelle-Aquitaine
- Coordinates: 43°34′57″N 0°13′55″W
- Country: France
- Region: Nouvelle-Aquitaine
- Department: Pyrénées-Atlantiques
- Arrondissement: Pau
- Canton: Terres des Luys et Coteaux du Vic-Bilh
- Intercommunality: Luys en Béarn

Government
  - Mayor (2020–2026): Jean-Paul Lahore
- Area^{1}: 5.83 km^{2} (2.25 sq mi)
- Elevation: 146 m (479 ft)
- Highest elevation: 240 m (790 ft)
- Lowest elevation: 106 m (348 ft)
- Population (2023): 90
  - Density: 15/km^{2} (40/sq mi)
- Time zone: UTC+01:00 (CET)
  - Summer (DST): UTC+02:00 (CEST)
- INSEE/Postal code: 64392 /64330
- ^{1} French Land Register data, which excludes lakes, ponds, glaciers > 1 km^{2} (0.386 sq mi or 247 acres) and river estuaries.

Moncla (French pronunciation: [mɔ̃kla]; Occitan: Montclar) is a commune in the Pyrénées-Atlantiques department in south-western France.

== See also ==
- Communes of the Pyrénées-Atlantiques department
