= Lespielle =

- Commune
- Location of Lespielle
- Location within France Location within Nouvelle-Aquitaine
- Coordinates: 43°28′27″N 0°08′35″W
- Country: France
- Region: Nouvelle-Aquitaine
- Department: Pyrénées-Atlantiques
- Arrondissement: Pau
- Canton: Terres des Luys et Coteaux du Vic-Bilh
- Intercommunality: Nord-Est Béarn

Government
  - Mayor (2020–2026): Olivier Domecq
- Area^{1}: 7.11 km^{2} (2.75 sq mi)
- Elevation: 304 m (997 ft)
- Highest elevation: 308 m (1,010 ft)
- Lowest elevation: 158 m (518 ft)
- Population (2023): 152
  - Density: 21.4/km^{2} (55.4/sq mi)
- Time zone: UTC+01:00 (CET)
  - Summer (DST): UTC+02:00 (CEST)
- INSEE/Postal code: 64337 /64350
- ^{1} French Land Register data, which excludes lakes, ponds, glaciers > 1 km^{2} (0.386 sq mi or 247 acres) and river estuaries.

Lespielle (French pronunciation: [lɛspjɛl]; Occitan: Lespièla) is a commune in the Pyrénées-Atlantiques department in south-western France.

== See also ==
- Communes of the Pyrénées-Atlantiques department
