= Mouhous =

- Commune
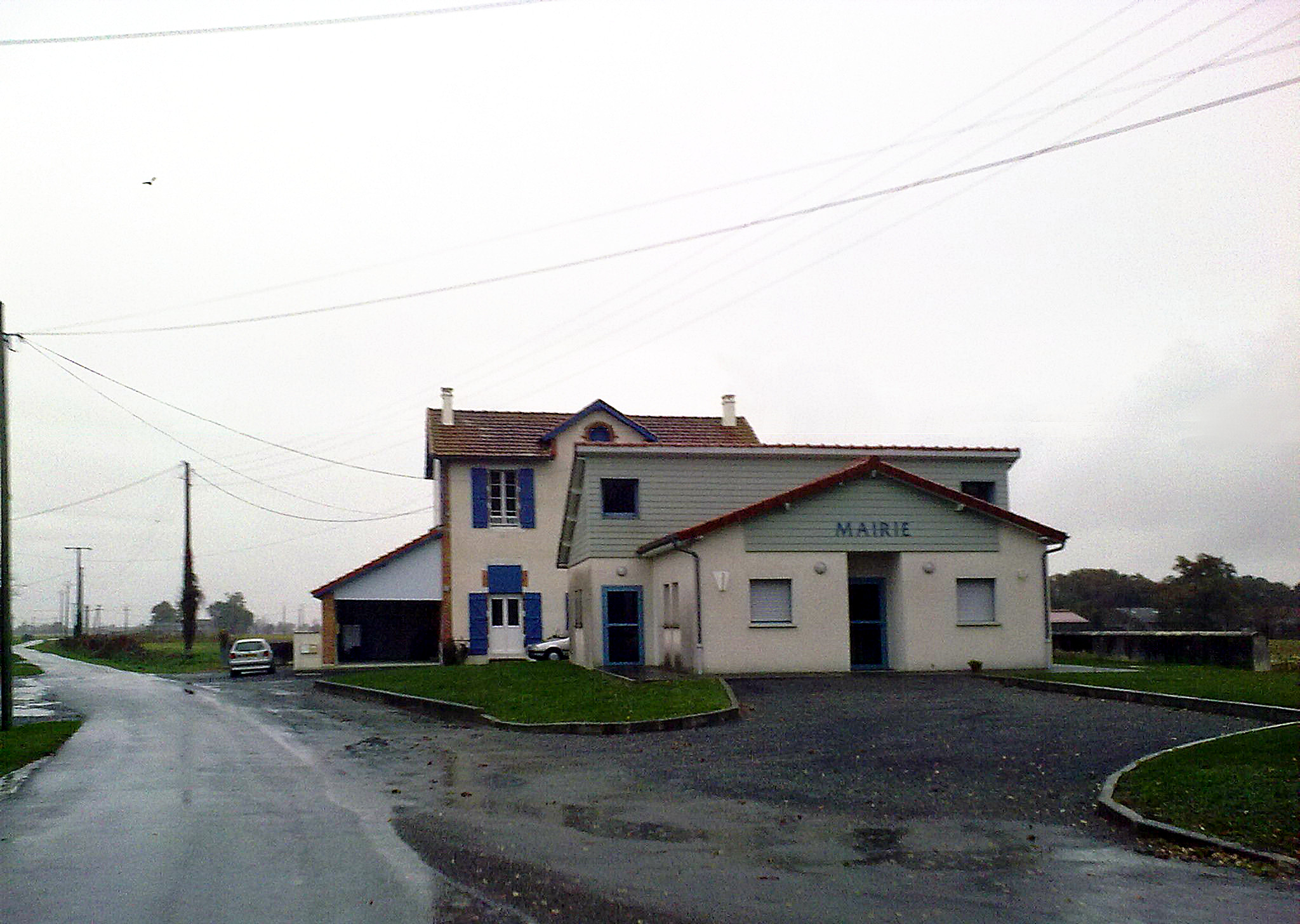
- The town hall of Mouhous
- Location of Mouhous
- Location within France Location within Nouvelle-Aquitaine
- Coordinates: 43°29′26″N 0°15′30″W
- Country: France
- Region: Nouvelle-Aquitaine
- Department: Pyrénées-Atlantiques
- Arrondissement: Pau
- Canton: Terres des Luys et Coteaux du Vic-Bilh
- Intercommunality: Luys en Béarn

Government
  - Mayor (2020–2026): Jean Cazalis Petit Jean
- Area^{1}: 3.30 km^{2} (1.27 sq mi)
- Elevation: 221 m (725 ft)
- Highest elevation: 252 m (827 ft)
- Lowest elevation: 166 m (545 ft)
- Population (2023): 75
  - Density: 23/km^{2} (59/sq mi)
- Time zone: UTC+01:00 (CET)
  - Summer (DST): UTC+02:00 (CEST)
- INSEE/Postal code: 64408 /64330
- ^{1} French Land Register data, which excludes lakes, ponds, glaciers > 1 km^{2} (0.386 sq mi or 247 acres) and river estuaries.

Mouhous is a commune in the Pyrénées-Atlantiques department in south-western France.

== See also ==
- Communes of the Pyrénées-Atlantiques department
