= Castetpugon =

- Commune
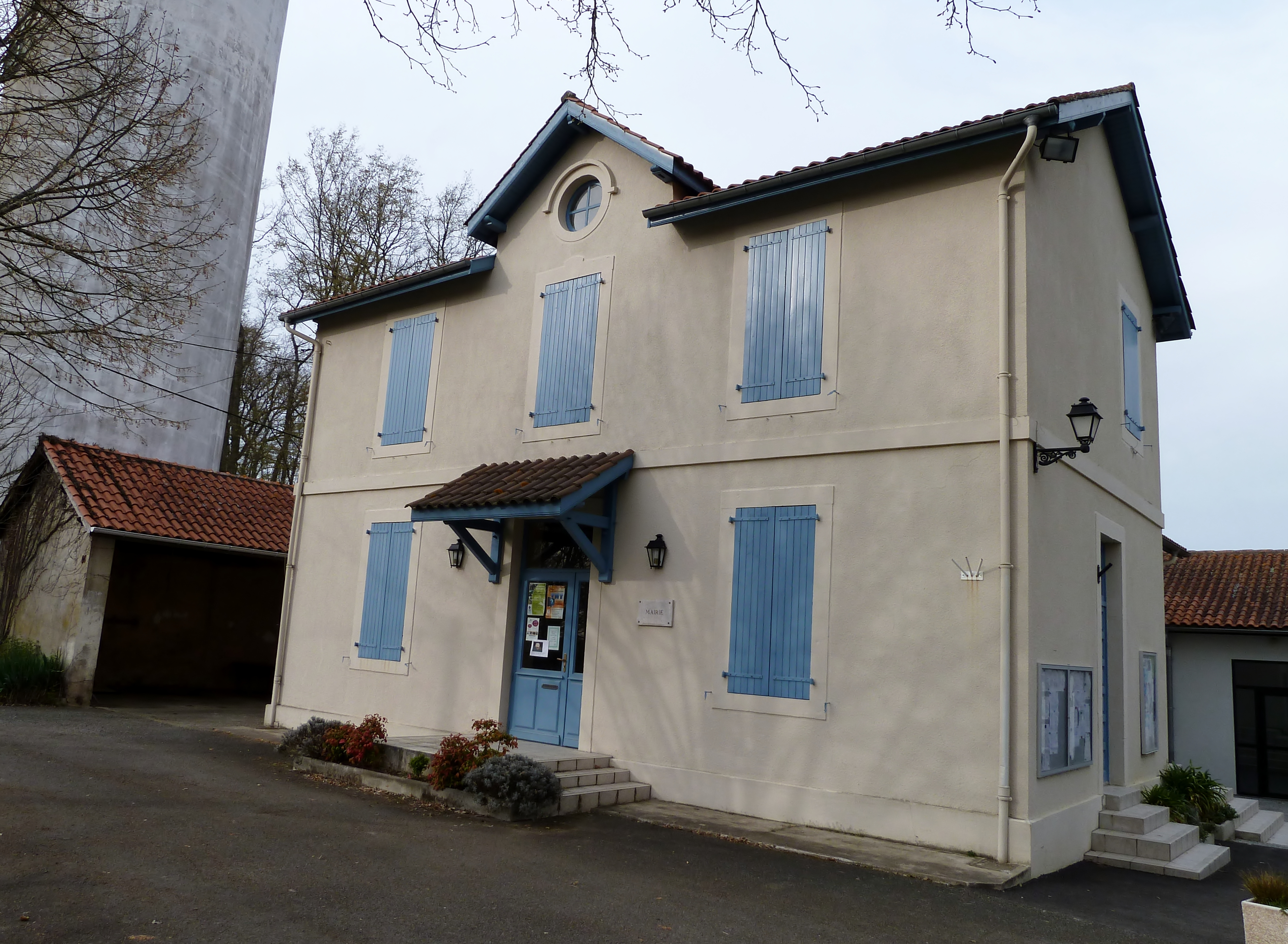
- The town hall of Castetpugon
- Location of Castetpugon
- Location within France Location within Nouvelle-Aquitaine
- Coordinates: 43°33′44″N 0°13′45″W
- Country: France
- Region: Nouvelle-Aquitaine
- Department: Pyrénées-Atlantiques
- Arrondissement: Pau
- Canton: Terres des Luys et Coteaux du Vic-Bilh
- Intercommunality: Luys en Béarn

Government
  - Mayor (2020–2026): Alain Piarrou
- Area^{1}: 7.49 km^{2} (2.89 sq mi)
- Elevation: 148 m (486 ft)
- Highest elevation: 251 m (823 ft)
- Lowest elevation: 114 m (374 ft)
- Population (2023): 214
  - Density: 28.6/km^{2} (74.0/sq mi)
- Time zone: UTC+01:00 (CET)
  - Summer (DST): UTC+02:00 (CEST)
- INSEE/Postal code: 64180 /64330
- ^{1} French Land Register data, which excludes lakes, ponds, glaciers > 1 km^{2} (0.386 sq mi or 247 acres) and river estuaries.

Castetpugon (French pronunciation: [kastɛtpyɡɔ̃]; Gascon: Castètpugoû) is a commune of 217 inhabitants in the Pyrénées-Atlantiques department in south-western France. It belongs to the arrondissement of Pau.

== See also ==
- Communes of the Pyrénées-Atlantiques department
