= Castillon (Canton of Lembeye) =

- Commune
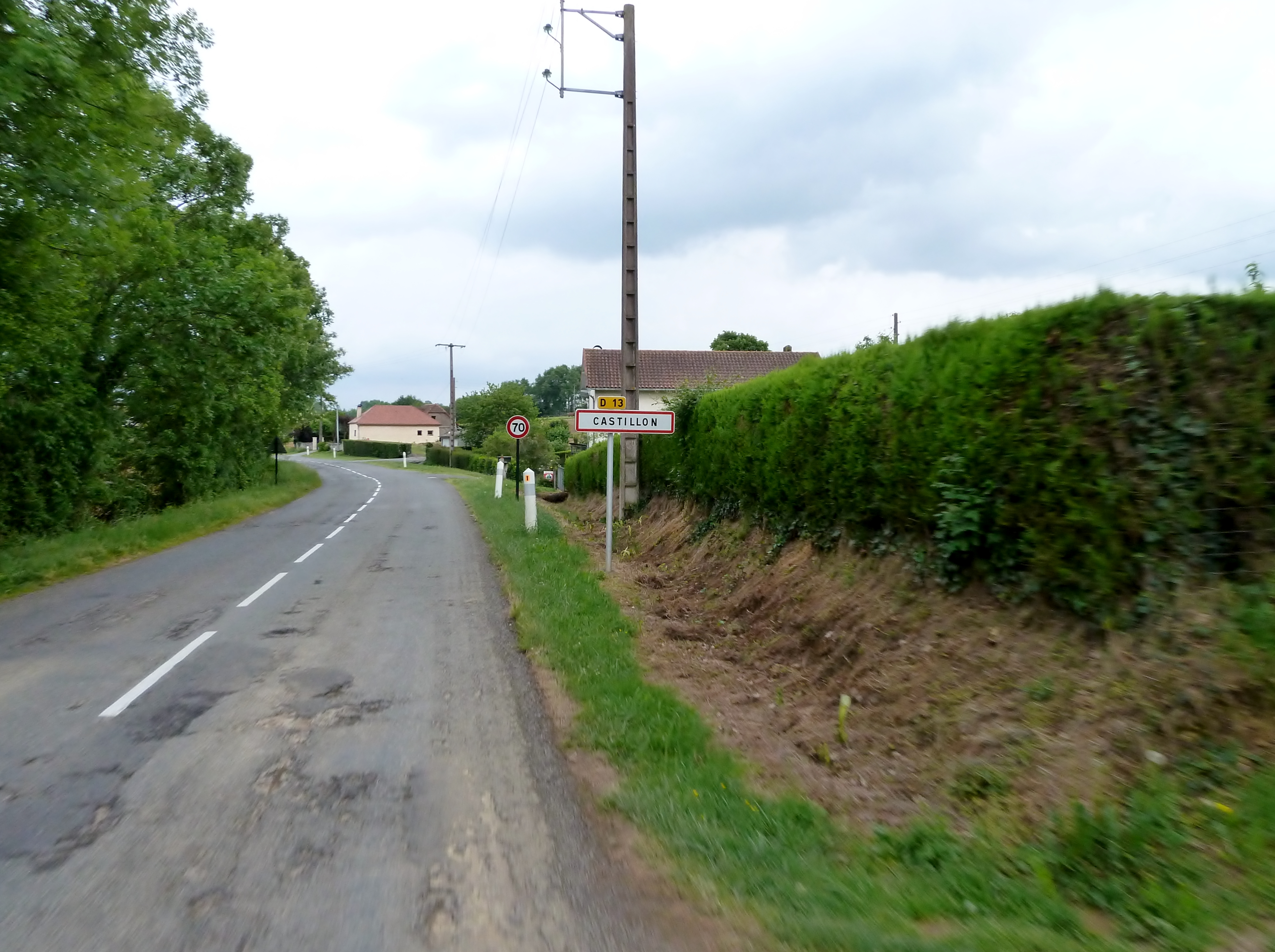
- The road into Castillon
- Location of Castillon (Canton of Lembeye)
- Location within France Location within Nouvelle-Aquitaine
- Coordinates: 43°28′52″N 0°07′37″W
- Country: France
- Region: Nouvelle-Aquitaine
- Department: Pyrénées-Atlantiques
- Arrondissement: Pau
- Canton: Terres des Luys et Coteaux du Vic-Bilh
- Intercommunality: Nord-Est Béarn

Government
  - Mayor (2020–2026): Robert Gaye
- Area^{1}: 4.72 km^{2} (1.82 sq mi)
- Elevation: 296 m (971 ft)
- Highest elevation: 307 m (1,007 ft)
- Lowest elevation: 154 m (505 ft)
- Population (2023): 83
  - Density: 18/km^{2} (46/sq mi)
- Time zone: UTC+01:00 (CET)
  - Summer (DST): UTC+02:00 (CEST)
- INSEE/Postal code: 64182 /64350
- ^{1} French Land Register data, which excludes lakes, ponds, glaciers > 1 km^{2} (0.386 sq mi or 247 acres) and river estuaries.

Castillon (French pronunciation: [kastijɔ̃], officially Castillon (Canton de Lembeye), sometimes referred to as Castillon-de-Lembeye; Occitan: Castilhon) is a commune in the Pyrénées-Atlantiques department in south-western France.

== See also ==
- Communes of the Pyrénées-Atlantiques department
