= Taron-Sadirac-Viellenave =

- Commune
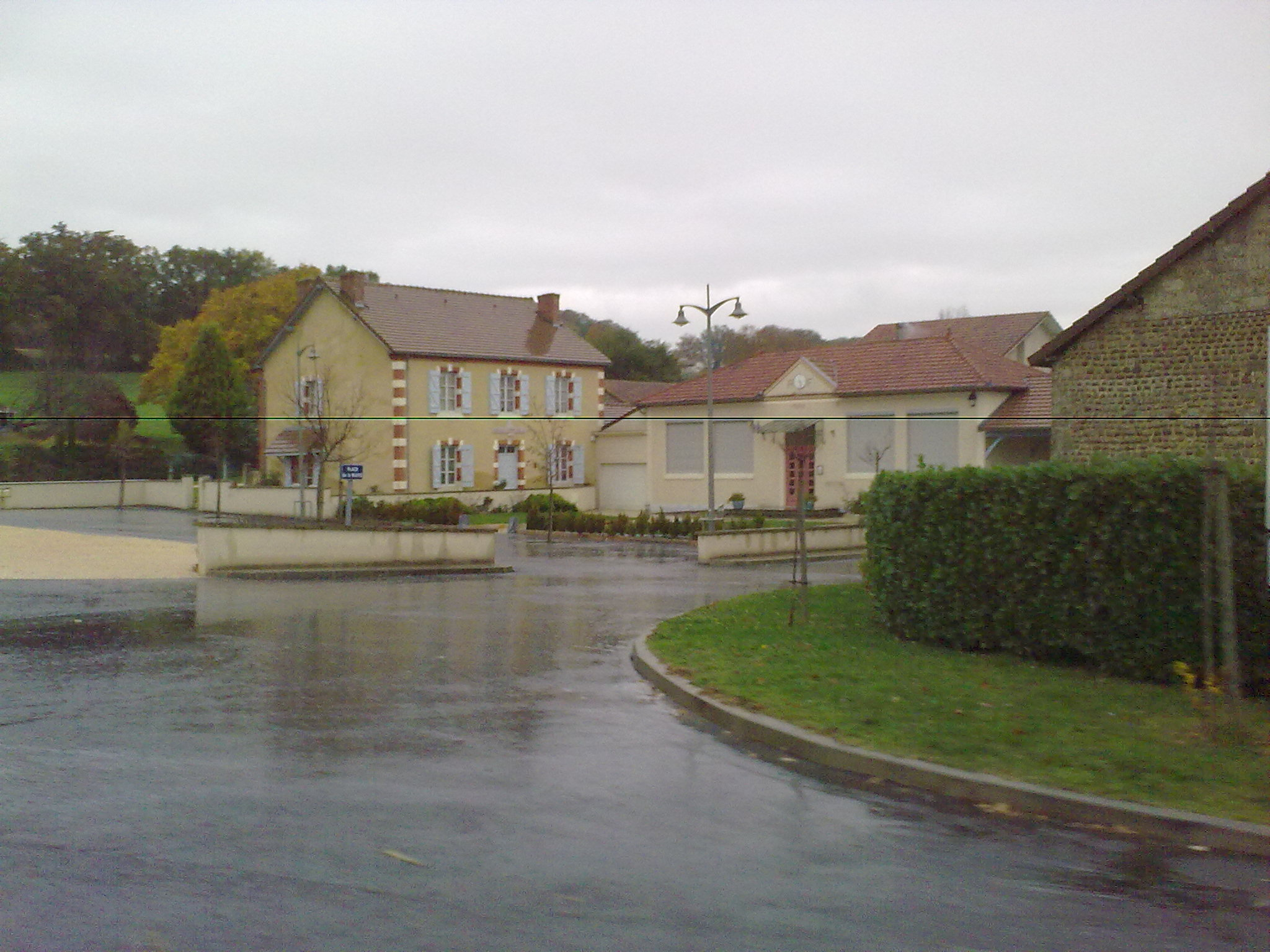
- The centre of the village
- Location of Taron-Sadirac-Viellenave
- Location within France Location within Nouvelle-Aquitaine
- Coordinates: 43°30′39″N 0°14′59″W
- Country: France
- Region: Nouvelle-Aquitaine
- Department: Pyrénées-Atlantiques
- Arrondissement: Pau
- Canton: Terres des Luys et Coteaux du Vic-Bilh
- Intercommunality: Luys en Béarn

Government
  - Mayor (2020–2026): Jean Guiraut
- Area^{1}: 13.86 km^{2} (5.35 sq mi)
- Elevation: 149 m (489 ft)
- Highest elevation: 251 m (823 ft)
- Lowest elevation: 135 m (443 ft)
- Population (2023): 168
  - Density: 12.1/km^{2} (31.4/sq mi)
- Time zone: UTC+01:00 (CET)
  - Summer (DST): UTC+02:00 (CEST)
- INSEE/Postal code: 64534 /64330
- ^{1} French Land Register data, which excludes lakes, ponds, glaciers > 1 km^{2} (0.386 sq mi or 247 acres) and river estuaries.

Taron-Sadirac-Viellenave (French pronunciation: [taʁɔ̃ sadiʁak vjɛlnav]; Gascon: Taron-Sadirac-Vièlanava) is a commune in the Pyrénées-Atlantiques department in south-western France.

== See also ==
- Communes of the Pyrénées-Atlantiques department
