= Portet =

- Commune
- Location of Portet
- Location within France Location within Nouvelle-Aquitaine
- Coordinates: 43°34′49″N 0°11′09″W
- Country: France
- Region: Nouvelle-Aquitaine
- Department: Pyrénées-Atlantiques
- Arrondissement: Pau
- Canton: Terres des Luys et Coteaux du Vic-Bilh
- Intercommunality: Luys en Béarn

Government
  - Mayor (2022–2026): Benjamin Cassou
- Area^{1}: 7.89 km^{2} (3.05 sq mi)
- Elevation: 177 m (581 ft)
- Highest elevation: 249 m (817 ft)
- Lowest elevation: 111 m (364 ft)
- Population (2023): 161
  - Density: 20.4/km^{2} (52.9/sq mi)
- Time zone: UTC+01:00 (CET)
  - Summer (DST): UTC+02:00 (CEST)
- INSEE/Postal code: 64455 /64330
- ^{1} French Land Register data, which excludes lakes, ponds, glaciers > 1 km^{2} (0.386 sq mi or 247 acres) and river estuaries.

Portet is a commune in the Pyrénées-Atlantiques department in south-western France.

== See also ==
- Communes of the Pyrénées-Atlantiques department
