= Conchez-de-Béarn =

- Commune
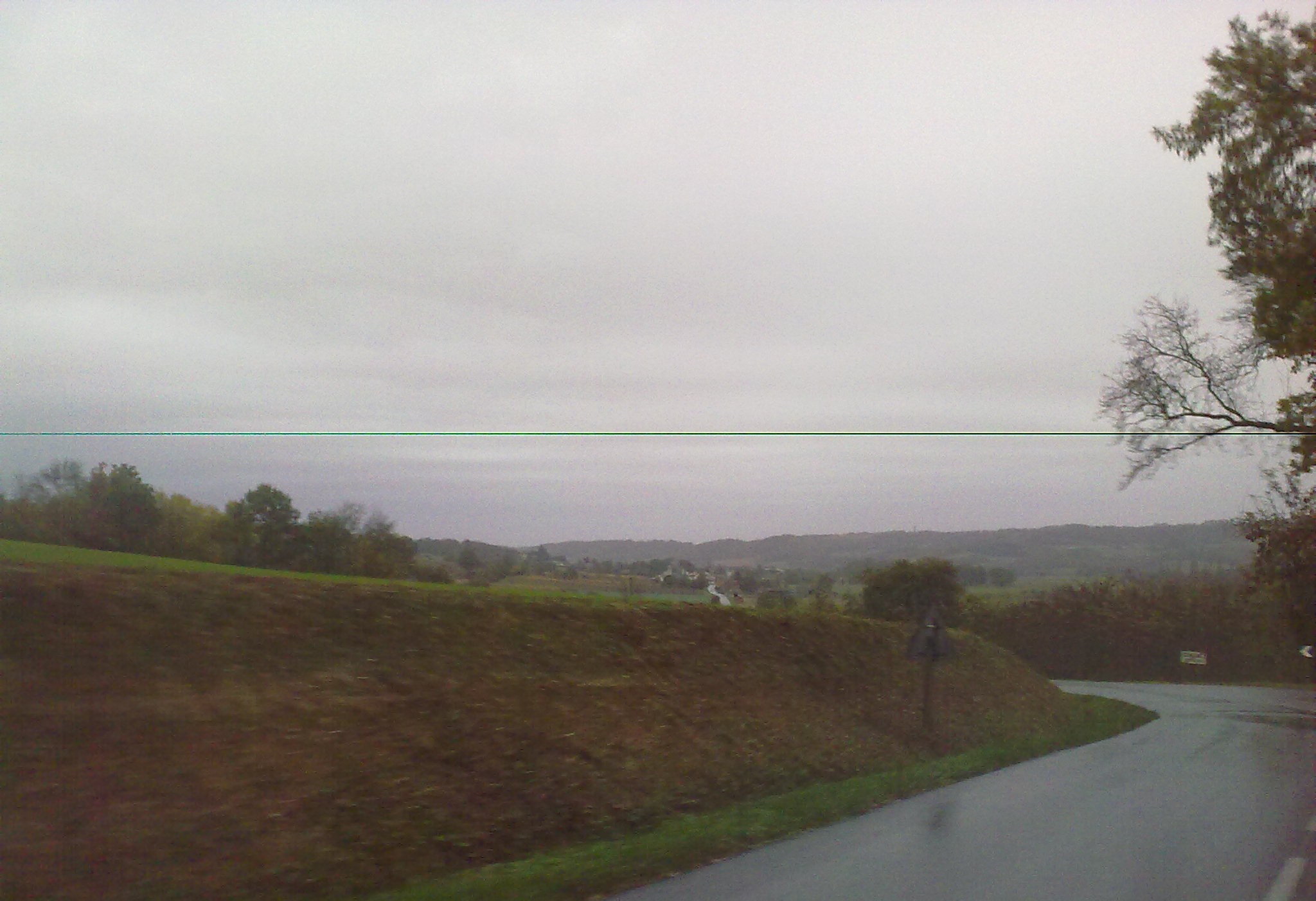
- The landscape of Conchez-de-Béarn

- Coat of arms
- Location of Conchez-de-Béarn
- Location within France Location within Nouvelle-Aquitaine
- Coordinates: 43°32′47″N 0°10′06″W
- Country: France
- Region: Nouvelle-Aquitaine
- Department: Pyrénées-Atlantiques
- Arrondissement: Pau
- Canton: Terres des Luys et Coteaux du Vic-Bilh
- Intercommunality: Luys en Béarn

Government
  - Mayor (2020–2026): Yves Caperaa
- Area^{1}: 4.49 km^{2} (1.73 sq mi)
- Elevation: 167 m (548 ft)
- Highest elevation: 261 m (856 ft)
- Lowest elevation: 122 m (400 ft)
- Population (2023): 116
  - Density: 25.8/km^{2} (66.9/sq mi)
- Time zone: UTC+01:00 (CET)
  - Summer (DST): UTC+02:00 (CEST)
- INSEE/Postal code: 64192 /64330
- ^{1} French Land Register data, which excludes lakes, ponds, glaciers > 1 km^{2} (0.386 sq mi or 247 acres) and river estuaries.

Conchez-de-Béarn (before 1962: Conchez) is a commune in the Pyrénées-Atlantiques department in south-western France.

== See also ==
- Communes of the Pyrénées-Atlantiques department
