= Diusse =

- Commune
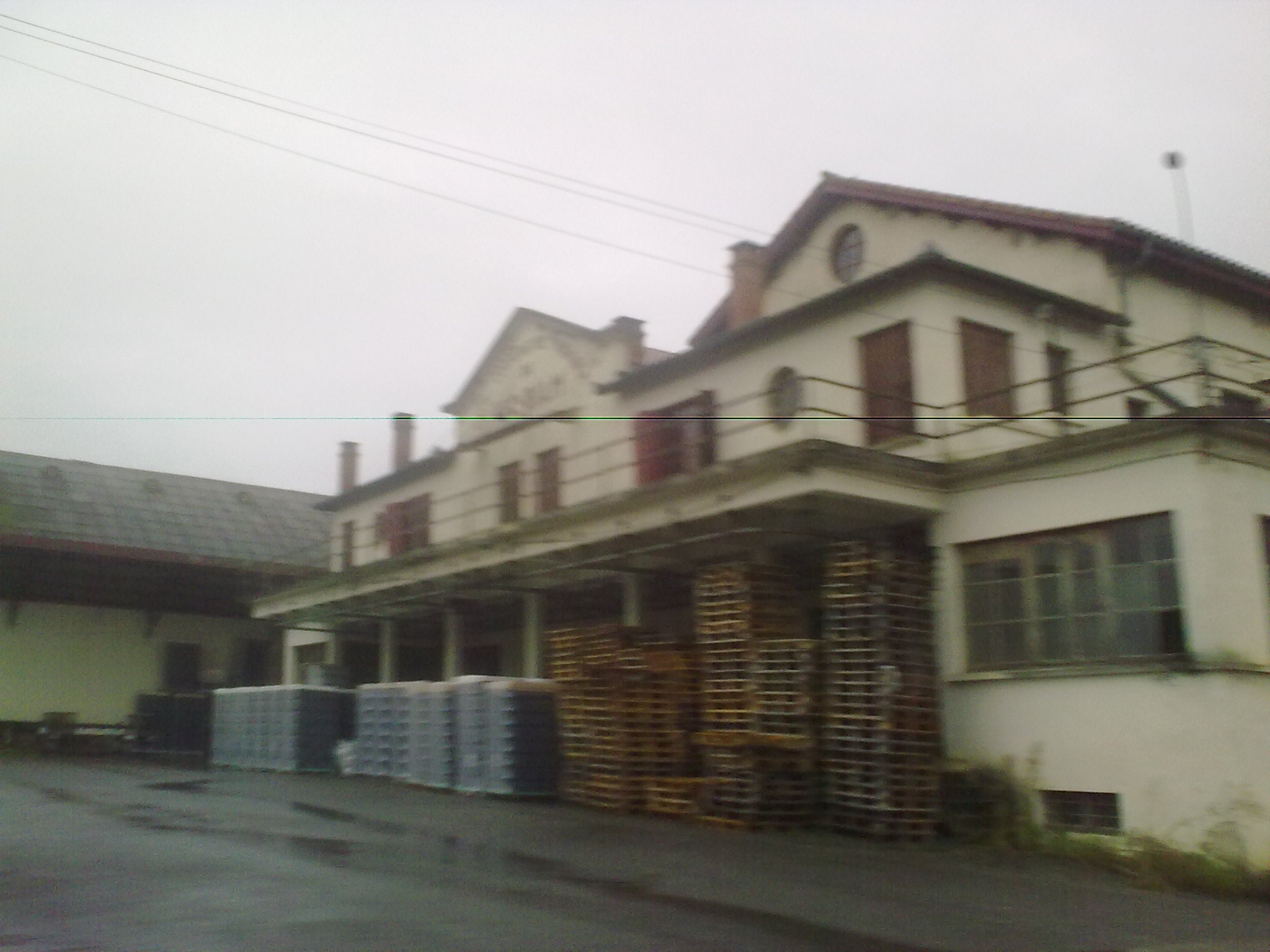
- The co-operative winery of Vic-Bilh, in Diusse
- Location of Diusse
- Location within France Location within Nouvelle-Aquitaine
- Coordinates: 43°33′50″N 0°09′48″W
- Country: France
- Region: Nouvelle-Aquitaine
- Department: Pyrénées-Atlantiques
- Arrondissement: Pau
- Canton: Terres des Luys et Coteaux du Vic-Bilh
- Intercommunality: Luys en Béarn

Government
  - Mayor (2020–2026): Michel Monségu
- Area^{1}: 5.31 km^{2} (2.05 sq mi)
- Elevation: 142 m (466 ft)
- Highest elevation: 249 m (817 ft)
- Lowest elevation: 119 m (390 ft)
- Population (2023): 146
  - Density: 27.5/km^{2} (71.2/sq mi)
- Time zone: UTC+01:00 (CET)
  - Summer (DST): UTC+02:00 (CEST)
- INSEE/Postal code: 64199 /64330
- ^{1} French Land Register data, which excludes lakes, ponds, glaciers > 1 km^{2} (0.386 sq mi or 247 acres) and river estuaries.

Diusse (French pronunciation: [djys]; Occitan: Diussa) is a commune in the Pyrénées-Atlantiques department in south-western France.

== See also ==
- Communes of the Pyrénées-Atlantiques department
