= Canton of Terres des Luys et Coteaux du Vic-Bilh =

Coordinates: 43.39°N 0.36°W

The canton of Terres des Luys et Coteaux du Vic-Bilh is an administrative division of the Pyrénées-Atlantiques department, southwestern France. It was created at the French canton reorganisation which came into effect in March 2015. Its seat is in Serres-Castet.

It consists of the following communes:

1. Anoye
2. Argelos
3. Arricau-Bordes
4. Arrosès
5. Astis
6. Aubin
7. Aubous
8. Auga
9. Auriac
10. Aurions-Idernes
11. Aydie
12. Baliracq-Maumusson
13. Bassillon-Vauzé
14. Bétracq
15. Boueilh-Boueilho-Lasque
16. Bournos
17. Burosse-Mendousse
18. Cadillon
19. Carrère
20. Castetpugon
21. Castillon
22. Caubios-Loos
23. Claracq
24. Conchez-de-Béarn
25. Corbère-Abères
26. Coslédaà-Lube-Boast
27. Crouseilles
28. Diusse
29. Doumy
30. Escurès
31. Garlède-Mondebat
32. Garlin
33. Gayon
34. Gerderest
35. Lalongue
36. Lalonquette
37. Lannecaube
38. Lasclaveries
39. Lasserre
40. Lembeye
41. Lème
42. Lespielle
43. Luc-Armau
44. Lucarré
45. Lussagnet-Lusson
46. Mascaraàs-Haron
47. Maspie-Lalonquère-Juillacq
48. Miossens-Lanusse
49. Monassut-Audiracq
50. Moncaup
51. Moncla
52. Monpezat
53. Montardon
54. Mont-Disse
55. Mouhous
56. Navailles-Angos
57. Peyrelongue-Abos
58. Portet
59. Pouliacq
60. Ribarrouy
61. Saint-Jean-Poudge
62. Samsons-Lion
63. Sauvagnon
64. Séméacq-Blachon
65. Serres-Castet
66. Sévignacq
67. Simacourbe
68. Tadousse-Ussau
69. Taron-Sadirac-Viellenave
70. Thèze
71. Vialer
72. Viven
