= Lasserre, Pyrénées-Atlantiques =

Lasserre
- Commune
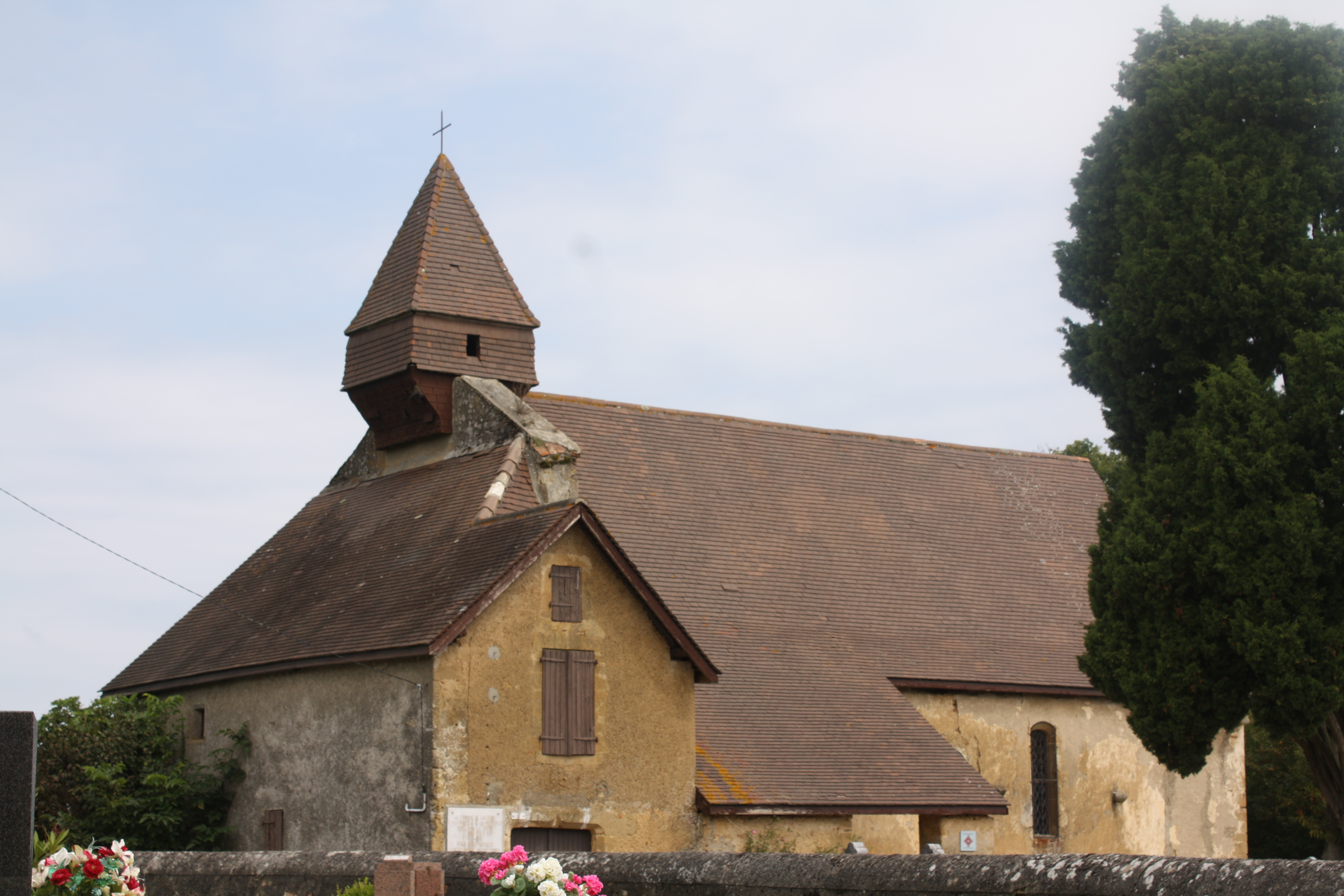
- The church of Lasserre
- Location of Lasserre
- Location within France Location within Nouvelle-Aquitaine
- Coordinates: 43°30′55″N 0°04′56″W
- Country: France
- Region: Nouvelle-Aquitaine
- Department: Pyrénées-Atlantiques
- Arrondissement: Pau
- Canton: Terres des Luys et Coteaux du Vic-Bilh
- Intercommunality: Nord-Est Béarn

Government
  - Mayor (2020–2026): Anne-Marie Vassallo
- Area^{1}: 4.23 km^{2} (1.63 sq mi)
- Elevation: 353 m (1,158 ft)
- Highest elevation: 257 m (843 ft)
- Lowest elevation: 154 m (505 ft)
- Population (2023): 115
  - Density: 27.2/km^{2} (70.4/sq mi)
- Time zone: UTC+01:00 (CET)
  - Summer (DST): UTC+02:00 (CEST)
- INSEE/Postal code: 64323 /64350
- ^{1} French Land Register data, which excludes lakes, ponds, glaciers > 1 km^{2} (0.386 sq mi or 247 acres) and river estuaries.

Lasserre (French pronunciation: [lasɛʁ]; Occitan: La Sèrra) is a commune in the Pyrénées-Atlantiques department in south-western France.

== See also ==
- Communes of the Pyrénées-Atlantiques department
