= Lucarré =

- Commune
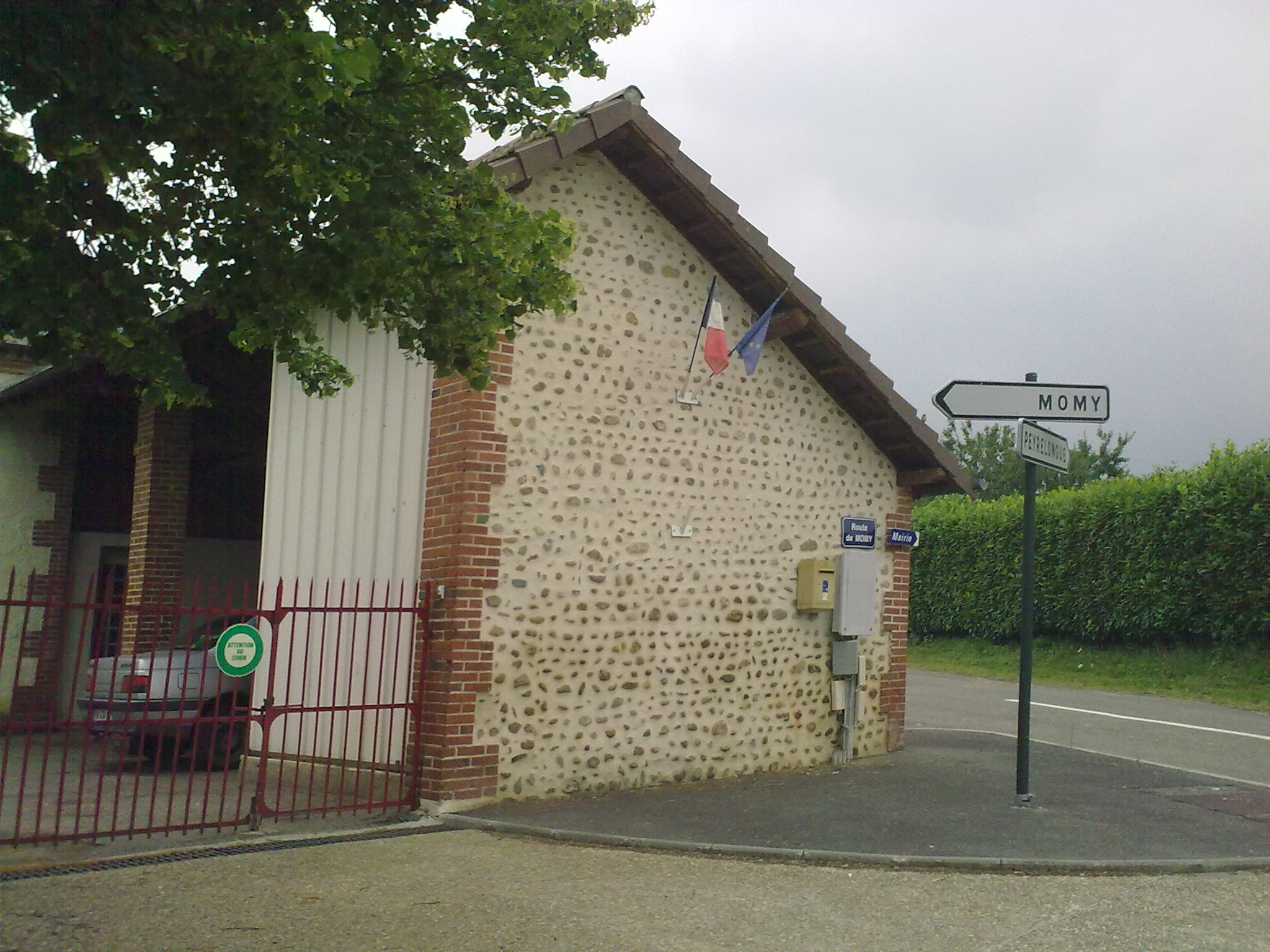
- The town hall of Lucarré
- Location of Lucarré
- Location within France Location within Nouvelle-Aquitaine
- Coordinates: 43°24′21″N 0°04′58″W
- Country: France
- Region: Nouvelle-Aquitaine
- Department: Pyrénées-Atlantiques
- Arrondissement: Pau
- Canton: Terres des Luys et Coteaux du Vic-Bilh
- Intercommunality: Nord-Est Béarn

Government
  - Mayor (2020–2026): Christian Roumigou
- Area^{1}: 3.32 km^{2} (1.28 sq mi)
- Elevation: 255 m (837 ft)
- Highest elevation: 337 m (1,106 ft)
- Lowest elevation: 230 m (750 ft)
- Population (2023): 64
  - Density: 19/km^{2} (50/sq mi)
- Time zone: UTC+01:00 (CET)
  - Summer (DST): UTC+02:00 (CEST)
- INSEE/Postal code: 64357 /64350
- ^{1} French Land Register data, which excludes lakes, ponds, glaciers > 1 km^{2} (0.386 sq mi or 247 acres) and river estuaries.

Lucarré (French pronunciation: [lykaʁe]; Occitan: Luc Arrèr) is a commune in the Pyrénées-Atlantiques department in south-western France.

== See also ==
- Communes of the Pyrénées-Atlantiques department
