= Lalongue =

- Commune
- Location of Lalongue
- Location within France Location within Nouvelle-Aquitaine
- Coordinates: 43°28′42″N 0°11′23″W
- Country: France
- Region: Nouvelle-Aquitaine
- Department: Pyrénées-Atlantiques
- Arrondissement: Pau
- Canton: Terres des Luys et Coteaux du Vic-Bilh
- Intercommunality: Nord-Est Béarn

Government
  - Mayor (2020–2026): Martine Hurbain
- Area^{1}: 7.94 km^{2} (3.07 sq mi)
- Elevation: 215 m (705 ft)
- Highest elevation: 307 m (1,007 ft)
- Lowest elevation: 164 m (538 ft)
- Population (2023): 201
  - Density: 25.3/km^{2} (65.6/sq mi)
- Time zone: UTC+01:00 (CET)
  - Summer (DST): UTC+02:00 (CEST)
- INSEE/Postal code: 64307 /64350
- ^{1} French Land Register data, which excludes lakes, ponds, glaciers > 1 km^{2} (0.386 sq mi or 247 acres) and river estuaries.

Lalongue (French pronunciation: [lalɔ̃ɡ]; Occitan: Lalonga) is a commune in the Pyrénées-Atlantiques department in south-western France.

== See also ==
- Communes of the Pyrénées-Atlantiques department
