= Ribarrouy =

- Commune
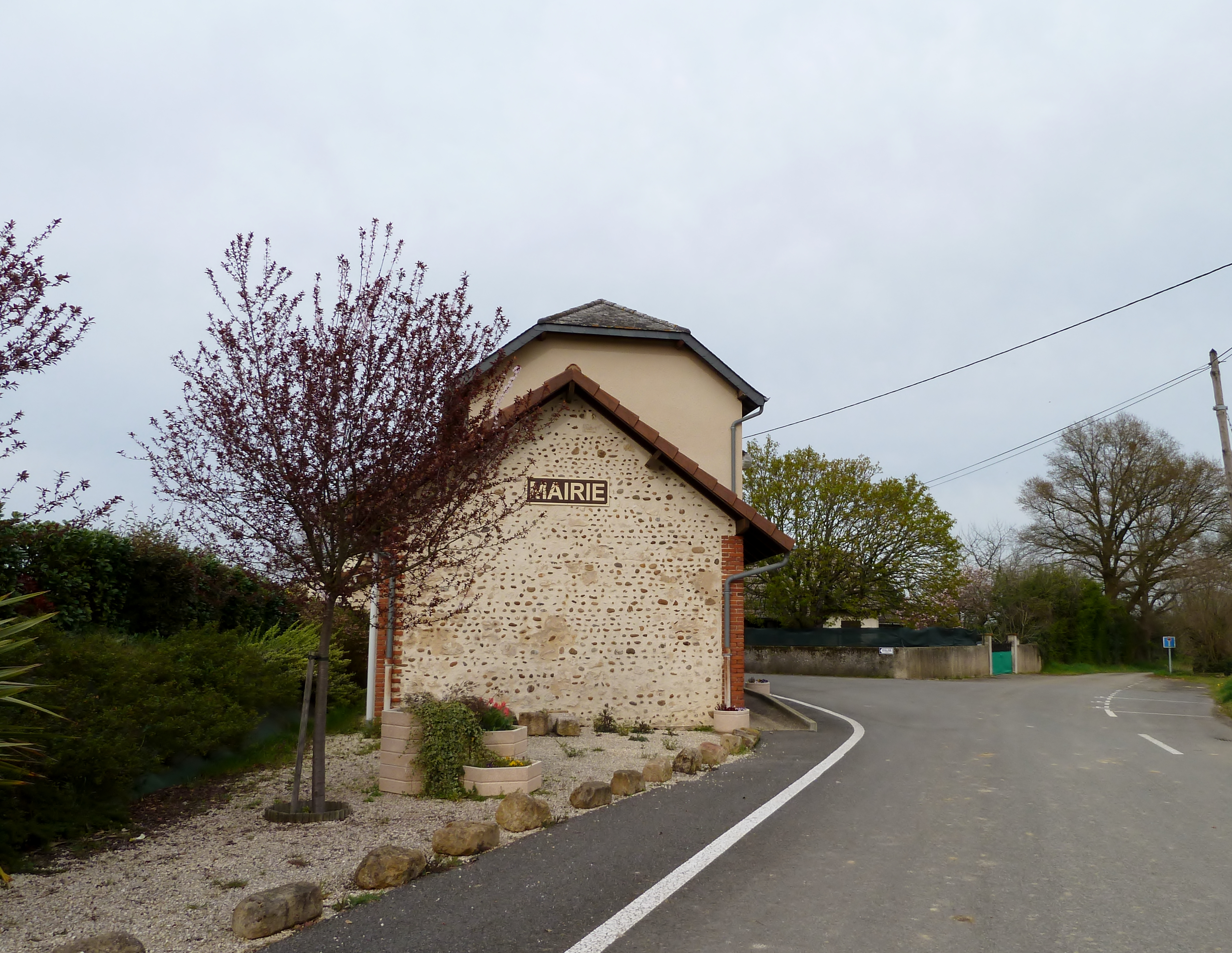
- The town hall of Ribarrouy
- Location of Ribarrouy
- Location within France Location within Nouvelle-Aquitaine
- Coordinates: 43°31′N 0°16′W
- Country: France
- Region: Nouvelle-Aquitaine
- Department: Pyrénées-Atlantiques
- Arrondissement: Pau
- Canton: Terres des Luys et Coteaux du Vic-Bilh

Government
  - Mayor (2020–2026): Bernard Jonville
- Area^{1}: 2.27 km^{2} (0.88 sq mi)
- Elevation: 216 m (709 ft)
- Highest elevation: 231 m (758 ft)
- Lowest elevation: 170 m (560 ft)
- Population (2023): 79
  - Density: 35/km^{2} (90/sq mi)
- Time zone: UTC+01:00 (CET)
  - Summer (DST): UTC+02:00 (CEST)
- INSEE/Postal code: 64464 /64330
- ^{1} French Land Register data, which excludes lakes, ponds, glaciers > 1 km^{2} (0.386 sq mi or 247 acres) and river estuaries.

Ribarrouy (French pronunciation: [ʁibaʁwi]; Occitan: Rivarroi) is a commune in the Pyrénées-Atlantiques department in south-western France.

== See also ==
- Communes of the Pyrénées-Atlantiques department
