= Boueilh-Boueilho-Lasque =

- Commune
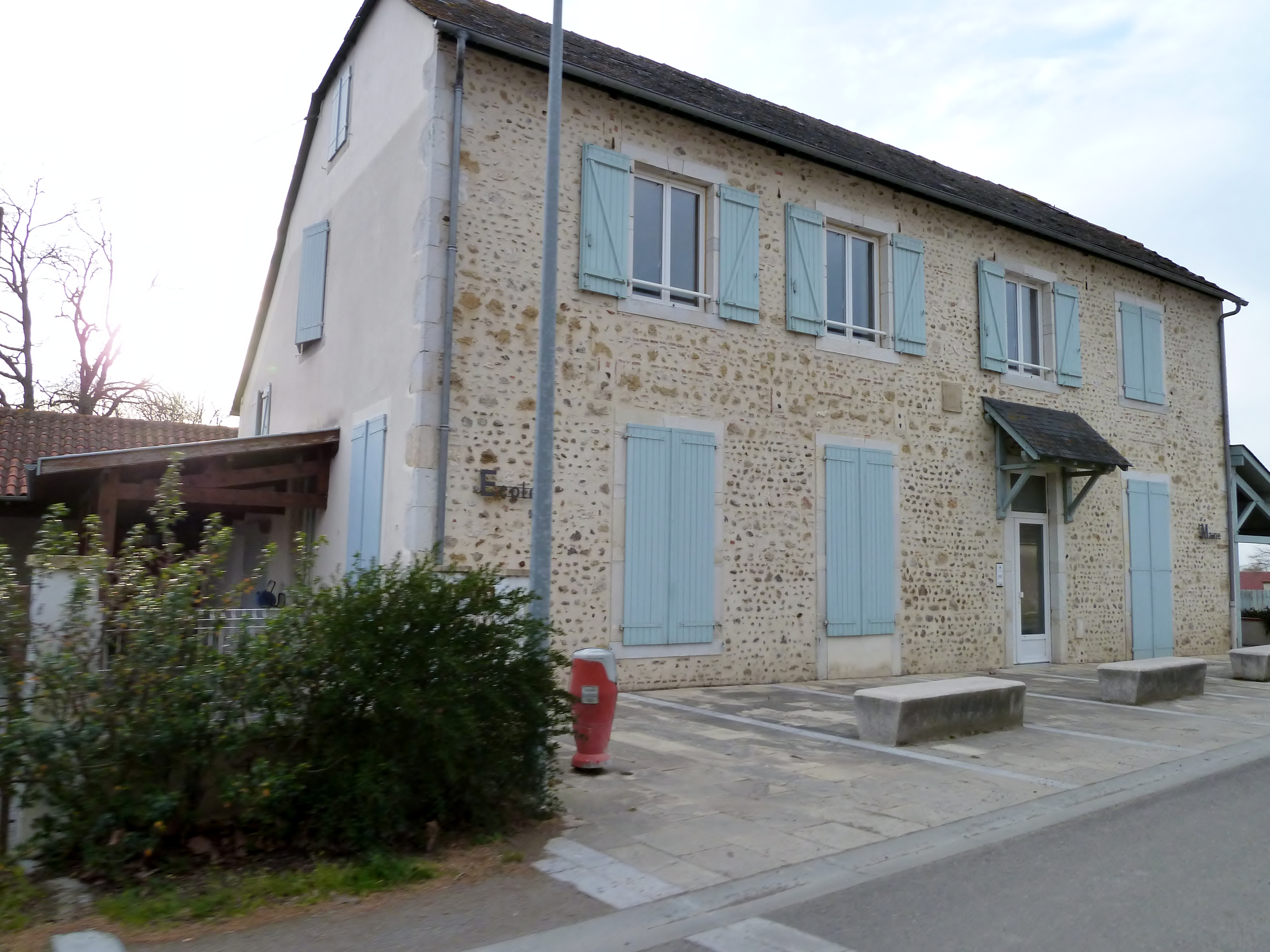
- The school of Boueilh-Boueilho-Lasque
- Location of Boueilh-Boueilho-Lasque
- Location within France Location within Nouvelle-Aquitaine
- Coordinates: 43°32′36″N 0°18′42″W
- Country: France
- Region: Nouvelle-Aquitaine
- Department: Pyrénées-Atlantiques
- Arrondissement: Pau
- Canton: Terres des Luys et Coteaux du Vic-Bilh
- Intercommunality: Luys en Béarn

Government
  - Mayor (2020–2026): Pierre Costadoat
- Area^{1}: 17.35 km^{2} (6.70 sq mi)
- Elevation: 227 m (745 ft)
- Highest elevation: 263 m (863 ft)
- Lowest elevation: 117 m (384 ft)
- Population (2023): 382
  - Density: 22.0/km^{2} (57.0/sq mi)
- Time zone: UTC+01:00 (CET)
  - Summer (DST): UTC+02:00 (CEST)
- INSEE/Postal code: 64141 /64330
- ^{1} French Land Register data, which excludes lakes, ponds, glaciers > 1 km^{2} (0.386 sq mi or 247 acres) and river estuaries.

Boueilh-Boueilho-Lasque (French pronunciation: [bwɛj bwɛjo lask]; Occitan: Buelh, Buelhòu e Lasque) is a commune in the Pyrénées-Atlantiques department in southwestern France.

== See also ==
- Communes of the Pyrénées-Atlantiques department
