= Tadousse-Ussau =

- Commune
- Location of Tadousse-Ussau
- Location within France Location within Nouvelle-Aquitaine
- Coordinates: 43°32′44″N 0°11′26″W
- Country: France
- Region: Nouvelle-Aquitaine
- Department: Pyrénées-Atlantiques
- Arrondissement: Pau
- Canton: Terres des Luys et Coteaux du Vic-Bilh
- Intercommunality: Luys en Béarn

Government
  - Mayor (2020–2026): Pascal Bourguinat
- Area^{1}: 4.73 km^{2} (1.83 sq mi)
- Elevation: 172 m (564 ft)
- Highest elevation: 263 m (863 ft)
- Lowest elevation: 119 m (390 ft)
- Population (2023): 73
  - Density: 15/km^{2} (40/sq mi)
- Time zone: UTC+01:00 (CET)
  - Summer (DST): UTC+02:00 (CEST)
- INSEE/Postal code: 64532 /64330
- ^{1} French Land Register data, which excludes lakes, ponds, glaciers > 1 km^{2} (0.386 sq mi or 247 acres) and river estuaries.

Tadousse-Ussau (French pronunciation: [tadus yso]; Occitan: Tadossa e Aussau) is a commune in the Pyrénées-Atlantiques department in south-western France.

== Population ==
Historical population
Year	Pop.	±% p.a.
1968	99	—
1975	73	−4.26%
1982	68	−1.01%
1990	75	+1.23%
1999	78	+0.44%
2007	68	−1.70%
2012	78	+2.78%
2017	67	−2.99%
2023	73	+1.44%
Source: INSEE

== See also ==
- Communes of the Pyrénées-Atlantiques department
