= Mont-Disse =

- Commune
- Location of Mont-Disse
- Location within France Location within Nouvelle-Aquitaine
- Coordinates: 43°33′29″N 0°08′58″W
- Country: France
- Region: Nouvelle-Aquitaine
- Department: Pyrénées-Atlantiques
- Arrondissement: Pau
- Canton: Terres des Luys et Coteaux du Vic-Bilh
- Intercommunality: Luys en Béarn

Government
  - Mayor (2020–2026): Charles Pélanne
- Area^{1}: 5.35 km^{2} (2.07 sq mi)
- Elevation: 136 m (446 ft)
- Highest elevation: 264 m (866 ft)
- Lowest elevation: 125 m (410 ft)
- Population (2023): 81
  - Density: 15/km^{2} (39/sq mi)
- Time zone: UTC+01:00 (CET)
  - Summer (DST): UTC+02:00 (CEST)
- INSEE/Postal code: 64401 /64330
- ^{1} French Land Register data, which excludes lakes, ponds, glaciers > 1 km^{2} (0.386 sq mi or 247 acres) and river estuaries.

Mont-Disse (French pronunciation: [mɔ̃ dis]; Occitan: Lo Mont e Dissa) is a commune in the Pyrénées-Atlantiques department in south-western France.

== See also ==
- Communes of the Pyrénées-Atlantiques department
