= Peyrelongue-Abos =

- Commune
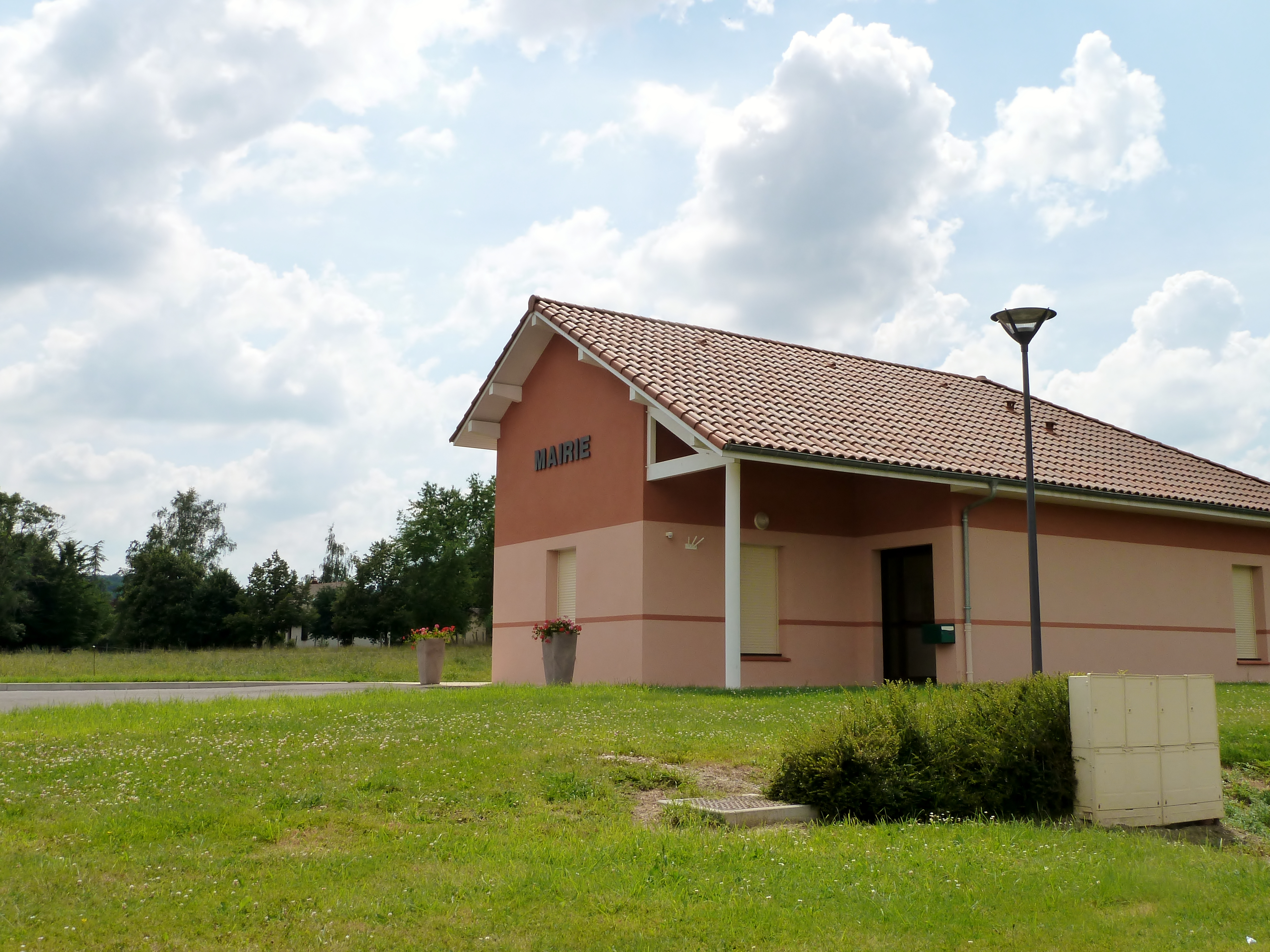
- The town hall of Peyrelongue-Abos
- Location of Peyrelongue-Abos
- Location within France Location within Nouvelle-Aquitaine
- Coordinates: 43°25′28″N 0°06′15″W
- Country: France
- Region: Nouvelle-Aquitaine
- Department: Pyrénées-Atlantiques
- Arrondissement: Pau
- Canton: Terres des Luys et Coteaux du Vic-Bilh
- Intercommunality: Nord-Est Béarn

Government
  - Mayor (2020–2026): Pierre Armau
- Area^{1}: 8.66 km^{2} (3.34 sq mi)
- Elevation: 222 m (728 ft)
- Highest elevation: 338 m (1,109 ft)
- Lowest elevation: 199 m (653 ft)
- Population (2023): 139
  - Density: 16.1/km^{2} (41.6/sq mi)
- Time zone: UTC+01:00 (CET)
  - Summer (DST): UTC+02:00 (CEST)
- INSEE/Postal code: 64446 /64350
- ^{1} French Land Register data, which excludes lakes, ponds, glaciers > 1 km^{2} (0.386 sq mi or 247 acres) and river estuaries.

Peyrelongue-Abos (Gascon: Pèiralonga e Avòs) is a commune in the Pyrénées-Atlantiques department in south-western France.

== History ==
In 1843, Peyrelongue absorbed the neighbouring commune of Abos to form the commune of Peyrelongue-Abos.

== See also ==
- Communes of the Pyrénées-Atlantiques department
