= Bétracq =

- Commune
- Location of Bétracq
- Location within France Location within Nouvelle-Aquitaine
- Coordinates: 43°30′49″N 0°03′16″W
- Country: France
- Region: Nouvelle-Aquitaine
- Department: Pyrénées-Atlantiques
- Arrondissement: Pau
- Canton: Terres des Luys et Coteaux du Vic-Bilh
- Intercommunality: Nord Est Béarn

Government
  - Mayor (2020–2026): François Dubertrand
- Area^{1}: 4.70 km^{2} (1.81 sq mi)
- Elevation: 225 m (738 ft)
- Highest elevation: 273 m (896 ft)
- Lowest elevation: 151 m (495 ft)
- Population (2023): 49
  - Density: 10/km^{2} (27/sq mi)
- Time zone: UTC+01:00 (CET)
  - Summer (DST): UTC+02:00 (CEST)
- INSEE/Postal code: 64118 /64350
- ^{1} French Land Register data, which excludes lakes, ponds, glaciers > 1 km^{2} (0.386 sq mi or 247 acres) and river estuaries.

Bétracq (French pronunciation: [betʁak]; Béarnese: Vetrac) is a commune of the Pyrénées-Atlantiques department in southwestern France.

== See also ==
- Communes of the Pyrénées-Atlantiques department
