= Simacourbe =

- Commune
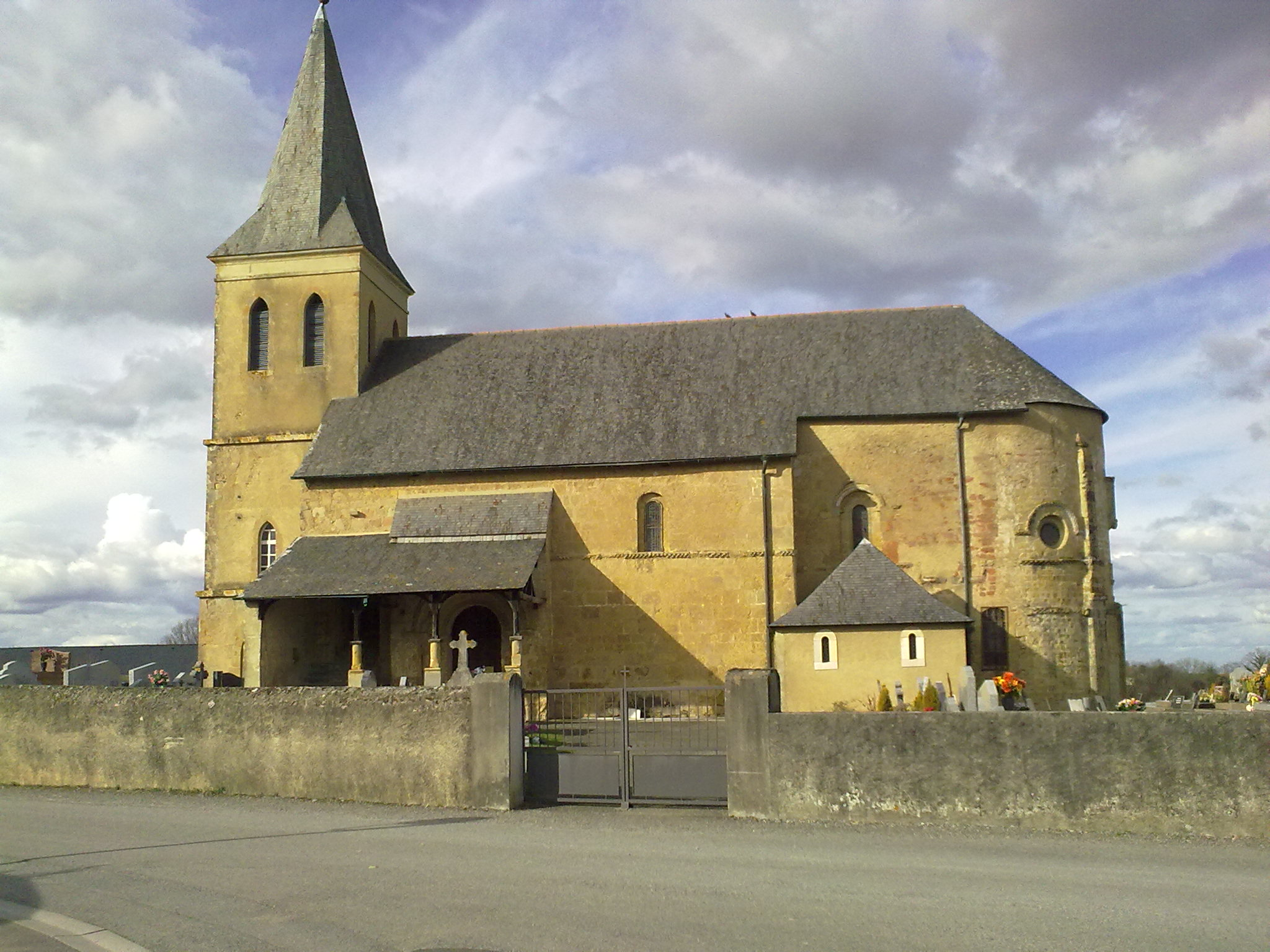
- The church of Simacourbe
- Location of Simacourbe
- Location within France Location within Nouvelle-Aquitaine
- Coordinates: 43°26′38″N 0°09′55″W
- Country: France
- Region: Nouvelle-Aquitaine
- Department: Pyrénées-Atlantiques
- Arrondissement: Pau
- Canton: Terres des Luys et Coteaux du Vic-Bilh
- Intercommunality: Nord-Est Béarn

Government
  - Mayor (2020–2026): Michel Chantre
- Area^{1}: 11.08 km^{2} (4.28 sq mi)
- Elevation: 269 m (883 ft)
- Highest elevation: 321 m (1,053 ft)
- Lowest elevation: 172 m (564 ft)
- Population (2023): 424
  - Density: 38.3/km^{2} (99.1/sq mi)
- Time zone: UTC+01:00 (CET)
  - Summer (DST): UTC+02:00 (CEST)
- INSEE/Postal code: 64524 /64350
- ^{1} French Land Register data, which excludes lakes, ponds, glaciers > 1 km^{2} (0.386 sq mi or 247 acres) and river estuaries.

Simacourbe (French pronunciation: [simakuʁb]; Occitan: Cimacorba) is a commune in Pyrénées-Atlantiques, a department in southwestern France.

== See also ==
- Communes of the Pyrénées-Atlantiques department
