= Caubios-Loos =

- Commune
- Location of Caubios-Loos
- Location within France Location within Nouvelle-Aquitaine
- Coordinates: 43°25′03″N 0°24′15″W
- Country: France
- Region: Nouvelle-Aquitaine
- Department: Pyrénées-Atlantiques
- Arrondissement: Pau
- Canton: Terres des Luys et Coteaux du Vic-Bilh
- Intercommunality: CC des Luys en Béarn

Government
  - Mayor (2020–2026): Bernard Layre
- Area^{1}: 7.20 km^{2} (2.78 sq mi)
- Elevation: 219 m (719 ft)
- Highest elevation: 278 m (912 ft)
- Lowest elevation: 150 m (490 ft)
- Population (2023): 683
  - Density: 94.9/km^{2} (246/sq mi)
- Time zone: UTC+01:00 (CET)
  - Summer (DST): UTC+02:00 (CEST)
- INSEE/Postal code: 64183 /64230
- ^{1} French Land Register data, which excludes lakes, ponds, glaciers > 1 km^{2} (0.386 sq mi or 247 acres) and river estuaries.

Caubios-Loos (French pronunciation: [kobjɔs lɔs]; Occitan: Cauviòs e Lòs) is a commune in the Pyrénées-Atlantiques department in south-western France.

== See also ==
- Communes of the Pyrénées-Atlantiques department
