= Lalonquette =

- Commune
- Location of Lalonquette
- Location within France Location within Nouvelle-Aquitaine
- Coordinates: 43°29′21″N 0°19′16″W
- Country: France
- Region: Nouvelle-Aquitaine
- Department: Pyrénées-Atlantiques
- Arrondissement: Pau
- Canton: Terres des Luys et Coteaux du Vic-Bilh
- Intercommunality: Luys en Béarn

Government
  - Mayor (2020–2026): Jean-Patrick Bazile
- Area^{1}: 5.32 km^{2} (2.05 sq mi)
- Elevation: 150 m (490 ft)
- Highest elevation: 228 m (748 ft)
- Lowest elevation: 148 m (486 ft)
- Population (2023): 261
  - Density: 49.1/km^{2} (127/sq mi)
- Time zone: UTC+01:00 (CET)
  - Summer (DST): UTC+02:00 (CEST)
- INSEE/Postal code: 64308 /64450
- ^{1} French Land Register data, which excludes lakes, ponds, glaciers > 1 km^{2} (0.386 sq mi or 247 acres) and river estuaries.

Lalonquette (French pronunciation: [lalɔ̃kɛt]; Occitan: Lalonqueta) is a commune in the Pyrénées-Atlantiques department in south-western France.

== See also ==
- Communes of the Pyrénées-Atlantiques department
