= Escurès =

- Commune
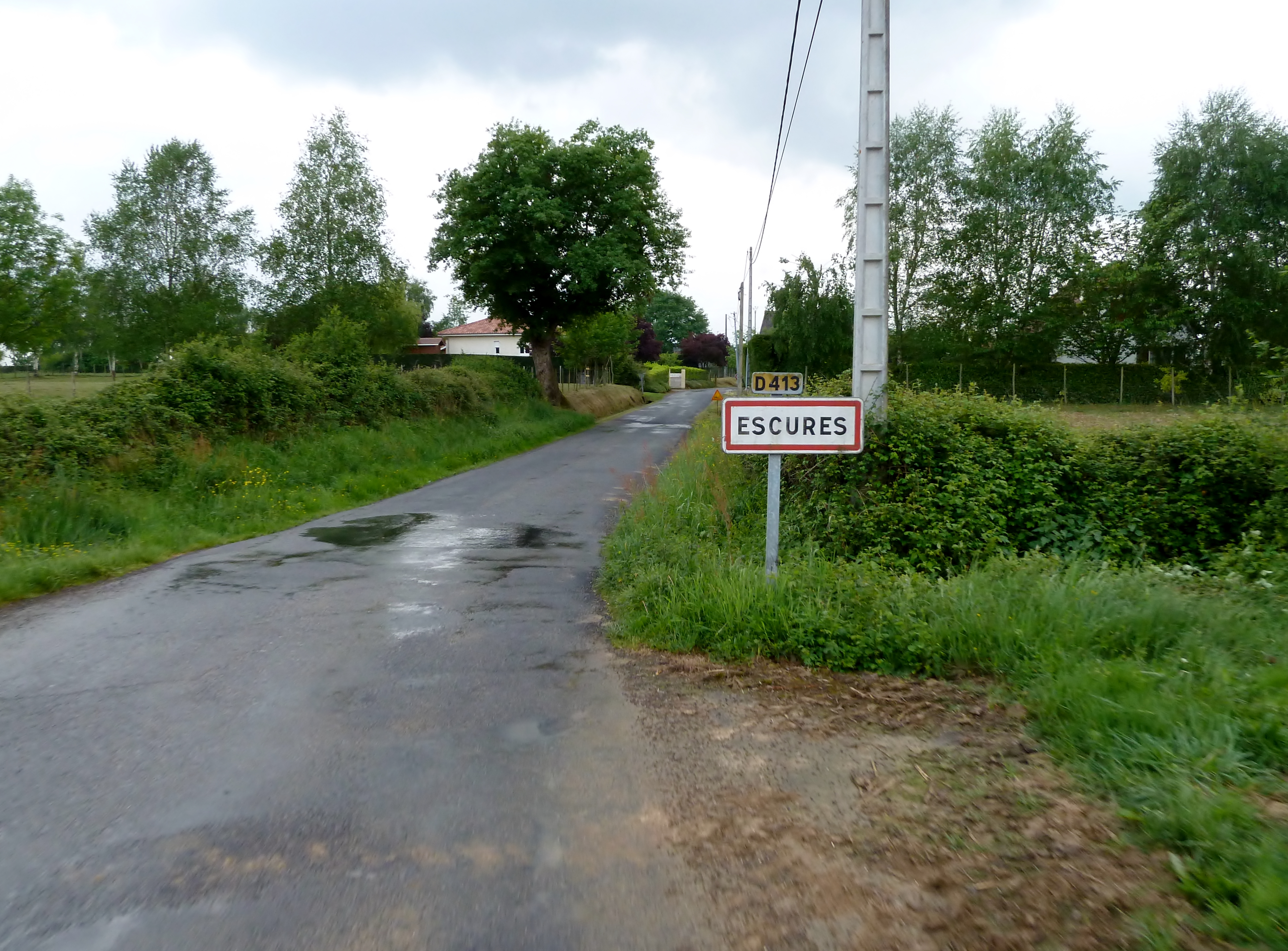
- The road into Escurès
- Location of Escurès
- Location within France Location within Nouvelle-Aquitaine
- Coordinates: 43°27′57″N 0°07′22″W
- Country: France
- Region: Nouvelle-Aquitaine
- Department: Pyrénées-Atlantiques
- Arrondissement: Pau
- Canton: Terres des Luys et Coteaux du Vic-Bilh
- Intercommunality: Nord-Est Béarn

Government
  - Mayor (2020–2026): Jean Nabos
- Area^{1}: 4.18 km^{2} (1.61 sq mi)
- Elevation: 307 m (1,007 ft)
- Highest elevation: 312 m (1,024 ft)
- Lowest elevation: 171 m (561 ft)
- Population (2023): 143
  - Density: 34.2/km^{2} (88.6/sq mi)
- Time zone: UTC+01:00 (CET)
  - Summer (DST): UTC+02:00 (CEST)
- INSEE/Postal code: 64210 /64350
- ^{1} French Land Register data, which excludes lakes, ponds, glaciers > 1 km^{2} (0.386 sq mi or 247 acres) and river estuaries.

Escurès (French pronunciation: [ɛskyʁɛs]; Occitan: Escuras) is a commune in the Pyrénées-Atlantiques department in south-western France.

== See also ==
- Communes of the Pyrénées-Atlantiques department
