= Lussagnet-Lusson =

- Commune
- Coat of arms
- Location of Lussagnet-Lusson
- Location within France Location within Nouvelle-Aquitaine
- Coordinates: 43°26′23″N 0°11′48″W
- Country: France
- Region: Nouvelle-Aquitaine
- Department: Pyrénées-Atlantiques
- Arrondissement: Pau
- Canton: Terres des Luys et Coteaux du Vic-Bilh
- Intercommunality: Nord-Est Béarn

Government
  - Mayor (2020–2026): Michel Laborde
- Area^{1}: 6.74 km^{2} (2.60 sq mi)
- Elevation: 240 m (790 ft)
- Highest elevation: 316 m (1,037 ft)
- Lowest elevation: 185 m (607 ft)
- Population (2023): 183
  - Density: 27.2/km^{2} (70.3/sq mi)
- Time zone: UTC+01:00 (CET)
  - Summer (DST): UTC+02:00 (CEST)
- INSEE/Postal code: 64361 /64160
- ^{1} French Land Register data, which excludes lakes, ponds, glaciers > 1 km^{2} (0.386 sq mi or 247 acres) and river estuaries.

Lussagnet-Lusson (French pronunciation: [lysaɲɛ lysɔ̃]; Occitan: Luçanhet e Luçon) is a commune in the Pyrénées-Atlantiques department in south-western France.

== See also ==
- Communes of the Pyrénées-Atlantiques department
