= Gerderest =

- Commune
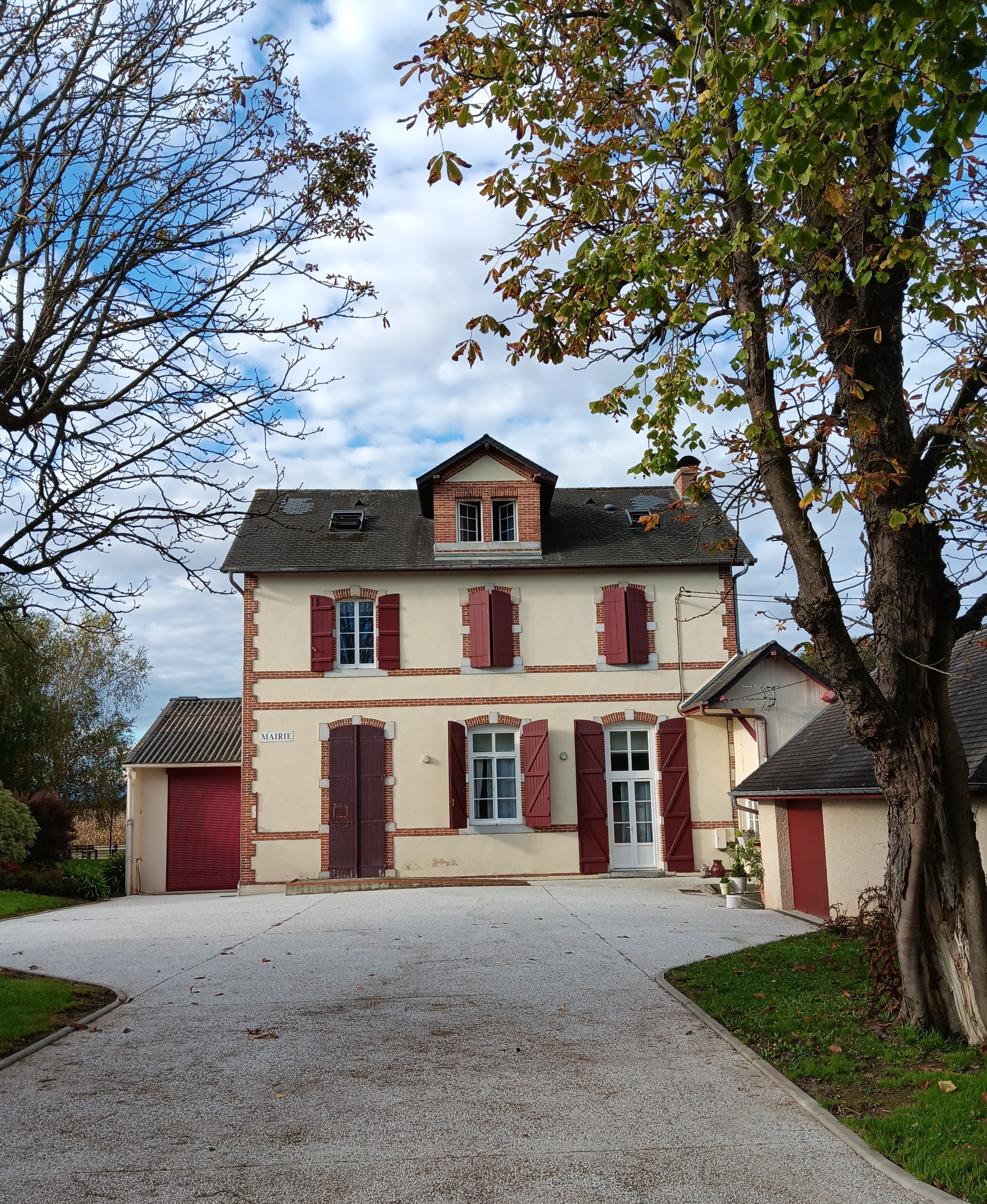
- Gerderest Town hall
- Location of Gerderest
- Location within France Location within Nouvelle-Aquitaine
- Coordinates: 43°24′41″N 0°10′33″W
- Country: France
- Region: Nouvelle-Aquitaine
- Department: Pyrénées-Atlantiques
- Arrondissement: Pau
- Canton: Terres des Luys et Coteaux du Vic-Bilh
- Intercommunality: Nord-Est Béarn

Government
  - Mayor (2020–2026): Daniel Tailleur
- Area^{1}: 6.56 km^{2} (2.53 sq mi)
- Elevation: 292 m (958 ft)
- Highest elevation: 341 m (1,119 ft)
- Lowest elevation: 219 m (719 ft)
- Population (2023): 141
  - Density: 21.5/km^{2} (55.7/sq mi)
- Time zone: UTC+01:00 (CET)
  - Summer (DST): UTC+02:00 (CEST)
- INSEE/Postal code: 64239 /64160
- ^{1} French Land Register data, which excludes lakes, ponds, glaciers > 1 km^{2} (0.386 sq mi or 247 acres) and river estuaries.

Gerderest is a commune in the Pyrénées-Atlantiques department and Nouvelle-Aquitaine region of south-western France.

== See also ==
- Communes of the Pyrénées-Atlantiques department
