= Saint-Jean-Poudge =

- Commune
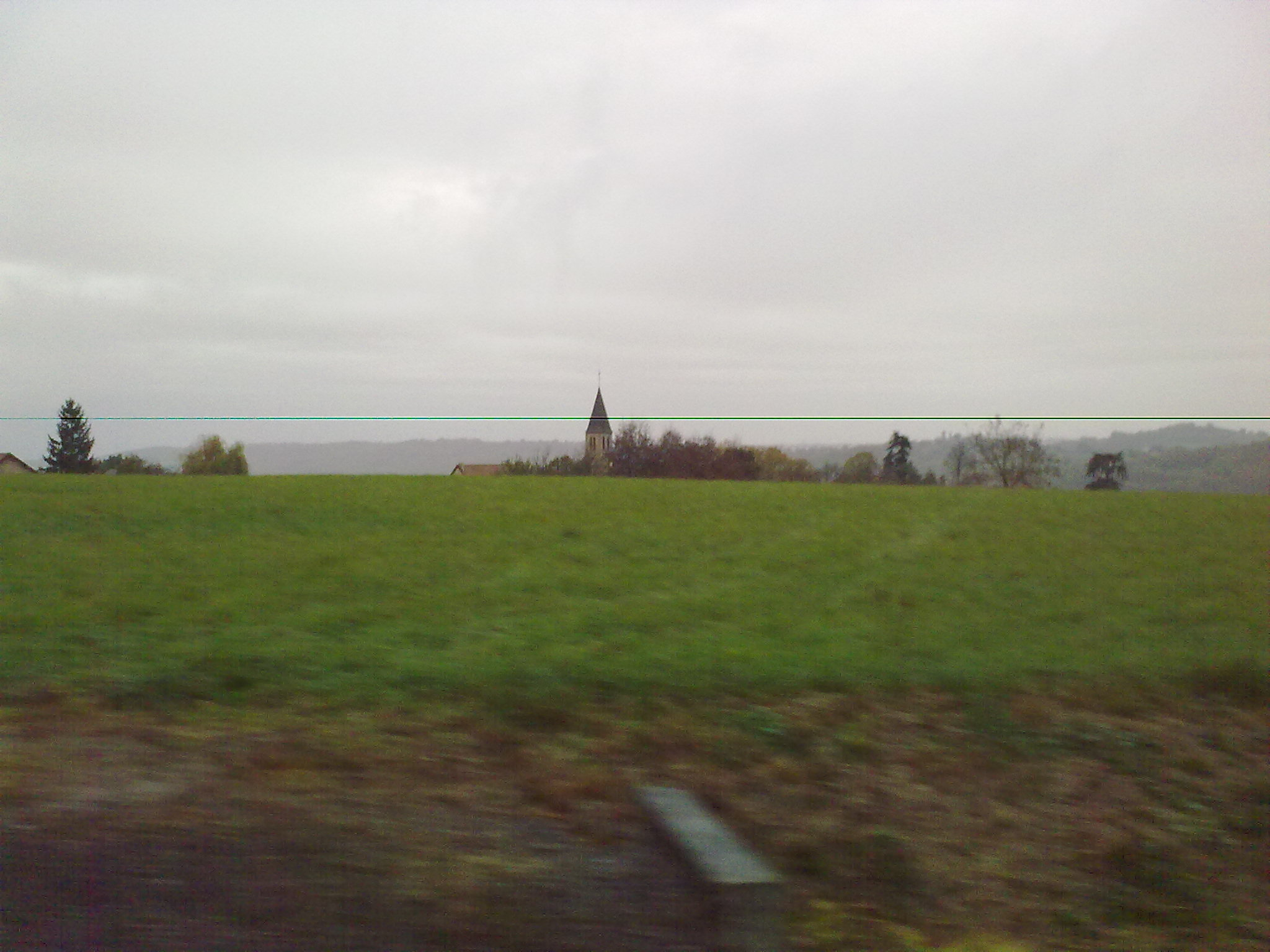
- The church of Saint-Jean-Poudge
- Location of Saint-Jean-Poudge
- Location within France Location within Nouvelle-Aquitaine
- Coordinates: 43°31′34″N 0°10′59″W
- Country: France
- Region: Nouvelle-Aquitaine
- Department: Pyrénées-Atlantiques
- Arrondissement: Pau
- Canton: Terres des Luys et Coteaux du Vic-Bilh

Government
  - Mayor (2022–2026): Jean-Jacques Cerisere
- Area^{1}: 3.93 km^{2} (1.52 sq mi)
- Elevation: 136 m (446 ft)
- Highest elevation: 276 m (906 ft)
- Lowest elevation: 129 m (423 ft)
- Population (2023): 79
  - Density: 20/km^{2} (52/sq mi)
- Time zone: UTC+01:00 (CET)
  - Summer (DST): UTC+02:00 (CEST)
- INSEE/Postal code: 64486 /64330
- ^{1} French Land Register data, which excludes lakes, ponds, glaciers > 1 km^{2} (0.386 sq mi or 247 acres) and river estuaries.

Saint-Jean-Poudge (French: [sɛ̃ ʒɑ̃ pudʒ]; Gascon: Sent Joan Potge) is a commune in the Pyrénées-Atlantiques department in south-western France.

== See also ==
- Communes of the Pyrénées-Atlantiques department
