= Claracq =

- Commune
- Location of Claracq
- Location within France Location within Nouvelle-Aquitaine
- Coordinates: 43°30′42″N 0°17′55″W
- Country: France
- Region: Nouvelle-Aquitaine
- Department: Pyrénées-Atlantiques
- Arrondissement: Pau
- Canton: Terres des Luys et Coteaux du Vic-Bilh
- Intercommunality: Luys en Béarn

Government
  - Mayor (2020–2026): Claude Cassou-Lalanne
- Area^{1}: 9.87 km^{2} (3.81 sq mi)
- Elevation: 204 m (669 ft)
- Highest elevation: 262 m (860 ft)
- Lowest elevation: 140 m (460 ft)
- Population (2023): 237
  - Density: 24.0/km^{2} (62.2/sq mi)
- Time zone: UTC+01:00 (CET)
  - Summer (DST): UTC+02:00 (CEST)
- INSEE/Postal code: 64190 /64330
- ^{1} French Land Register data, which excludes lakes, ponds, glaciers > 1 km^{2} (0.386 sq mi or 247 acres) and river estuaries.

Claracq (French pronunciation: [klaʁak]; Occitan: Clarac) is a commune in the Pyrénées-Atlantiques department in south-western France.

== See also ==
- Communes of the Pyrénées-Atlantiques department
