= Lème =

- Commune
- Location of Lème
- Location within France Location within Nouvelle-Aquitaine
- Coordinates: 43°29′38″N 0°21′57″W
- Country: France
- Region: Nouvelle-Aquitaine
- Department: Pyrénées-Atlantiques
- Arrondissement: Pau
- Canton: Terres des Luys et Coteaux du Vic-Bilh
- Intercommunality: Luys en Béarn

Government
  - Mayor (2020–2026): Jean Venant
- Area^{1}: 6.72 km^{2} (2.59 sq mi)
- Elevation: 219 m (719 ft)
- Highest elevation: 252 m (827 ft)
- Lowest elevation: 127 m (417 ft)
- Population (2023): 168
  - Density: 25.0/km^{2} (64.7/sq mi)
- Time zone: UTC+01:00 (CET)
  - Summer (DST): UTC+02:00 (CEST)
- INSEE/Postal code: 64332 /64450
- ^{1} French Land Register data, which excludes lakes, ponds, glaciers > 1 km^{2} (0.386 sq mi or 247 acres) and river estuaries.

Lème (French pronunciation: [lɛm]) is a commune in the Pyrénées-Atlantiques department in south-western France.

== See also ==
- Communes of the Pyrénées-Atlantiques department
