= Bassillon-Vauzé =

Commune in southwestern France

- Commune
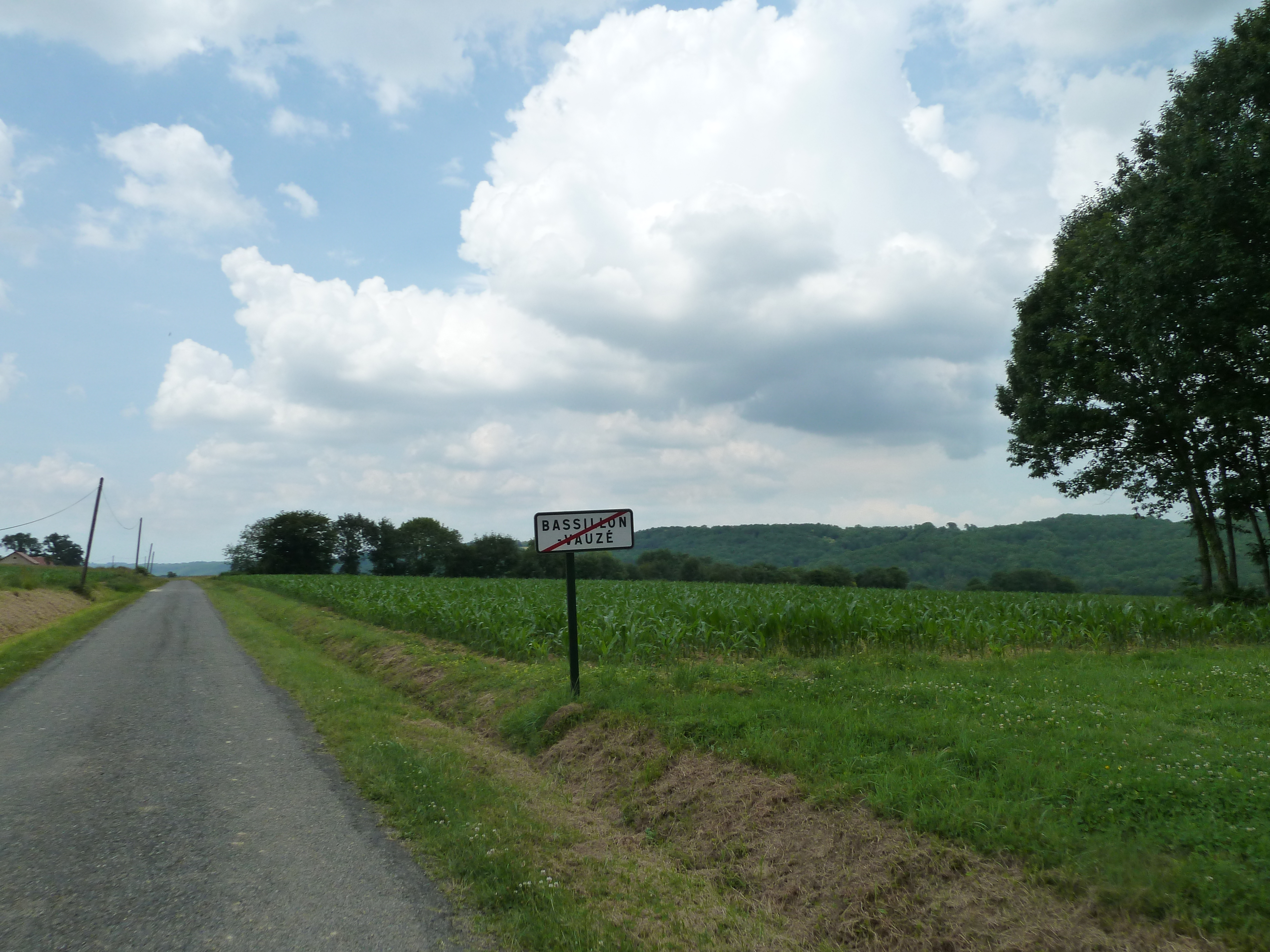
- The Entrance to the commune
- Location of Bassillon-Vauzé
- Location within France Location within Nouvelle-Aquitaine
- Coordinates: 43°27′27″N 0°04′27″W
- Country: France
- Region: Nouvelle-Aquitaine
- Department: Pyrénées-Atlantiques
- Arrondissement: Pau
- Canton: Terres des Luys et Coteaux du Vic-Bilh
- Intercommunality: Nord Est Béarn

Government
  - Mayor (2020–2026): Dominique Duclerc
- Area^{1}: 4.96 km^{2} (1.92 sq mi)
- Elevation: 211 m (692 ft)
- Highest elevation: 303 m (994 ft)
- Lowest elevation: 190 m (620 ft)
- Population (2023): 64
  - Density: 13/km^{2} (33/sq mi)
- Time zone: UTC+01:00 (CET)
  - Summer (DST): UTC+02:00 (CEST)
- INSEE/Postal code: 64098 /64350
- ^{1} French Land Register data, which excludes lakes, ponds, glaciers > 1 km^{2} (0.386 sq mi or 247 acres) and river estuaries.

Bassillon-Vauzé (French pronunciation: [basijɔ̃ voze]; Occitan: Bassilhon e Bausèr) is a commune of the Pyrénées-Atlantiques department in the Nouvelle-Aquitaine region of south-western France.

== Geography ==
Bassillon-Vauzé is located some 25 km north-east of Pau and 8 km west of Maubourguet. The eastern border of the commune is also the departmental border with Hautes-Pyrénées. Access to the commune is by the D68 from Vidouze in the east which changes to the D148 at the departmental border and continues through the south of the commune west to join the D943 south-west of the commune. The D205 comes from Corbère-Abères in the north which passes through the commune and continues south to join the D148 in the south of the commune. The commune is mostly farmland with some forest in the west.

The Larcis river and the Lac de Bassillon, which is formed by a dam on the Larcis, form the eastern border of the commune. The Ruisseau du Boscq forms the western border of the commune as it flows north into the lake formed by the Retenue de Lembeye-Corbères dam.

=== Places and Hamlets ===
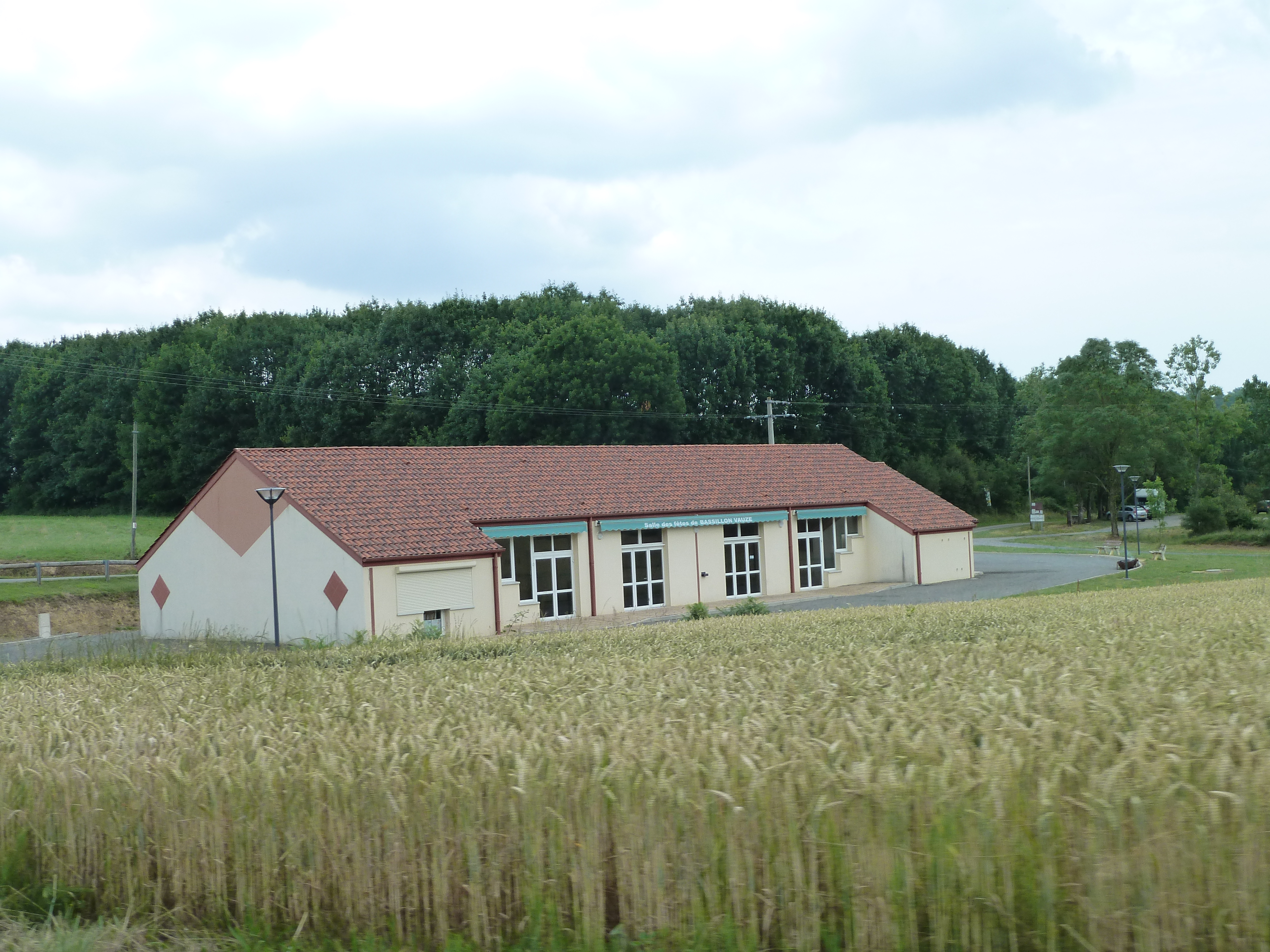
The communal hall

- Bassillon
- Camescasse
- Canton
- Les Garrus
- Grabette
- Lasplaces
- Marela
- Maury
- Millo
- Le Moutha
- Pachera
- Pouey
- Routgé
- Toubarthe
- Vauzé

== Toponymy ==
Michel Grosclaude said that Bassillon comes from the Latin name Bassilius with the suffix -onem, giving "Domain of Bassius". The origin of Vauzé is undetermined.

The following table details the origins of the commune name and other names in the commune.

Name	Spelling	Date	Source	Page	Origin	Description
Bassillon	Basilhoo	1385	Grosclaude		Census	Village
	Basilhoo	1402	Raymond	23	Census	
	Bacilhoo	1540	Raymond	23	Reformation	
	Baxilho	1542	Raymond	23	Reformation	
	Basilhon	1546	Raymond	23	Reformation	
	Bacilhon	1550	Raymond	23	Reformation	
	Baßillon	1750	Cassini			
	Bassillon	1790	Cassini1			
Vauzé	Bauser	1385	Grosclaude		Census	Village
	Bausee	1538	Raymond	173	Reformation	
	Bauser	1538	Raymond	173	Reformation	
	Beauzé	1675	Raymond	173	Reformation	
	Vauzer	1682	Raymond	173	Reformation	
	Vauzé	1750	Cassini			
	Vauser	1768	Raymond	173	Denombrement	
	Vauzé	1790	Cassini1	173	Reformation	
Le Castet	Le Castet	1863	Raymond	45		Farm
Le Moutha	Le Moutha	1863	Raymond	120		Place
Moutoné	Mountouné	1774	Raymond	120	Terrier of Bassillon	Place

Sources:

- Grosclaude: Toponymic Dictionary of communes, Béarn, 2006 (in French)
- Raymond: Topographic Dictionary of the Department of Basses-Pyrenees, 1863, on the page numbers indicated in the table. (in French)
- Cassini: 1750 Cassini Map
- Cassini1: 1790 Cassini Map

Origins:

- Census: Census of Béarn
- Reformation: Reformation of Béarn
- Denombrement: Denombremont of Candau

== History ==
Paul Raymond noted on page 23 of his 1863 dictionary that in 1385 Bassillon had 7 fires and depended on the bailiwick of Lembeye. On page 173 he mentioned that Vauzé had a lay abbey, vassal of the Viscount of Vauzé, and that the Barony of Vauzé was created in 1641 under the Viscounts of Béarn which included Peyrelongue-Abos and Vauzé.

The former communes of Bassillon and Vauzé were merged in 1833.

== Administration ==
List of Successive Mayors

From	To	Name
1995	2014	Jean-Claude Maury
2014	2020	Claude Lagarrue
2020	2026	Dominique Duclerc

=== Inter-communality ===
The commune is part of four inter-communal structures:

- the Communauté de communes du Nord-Est Béarn
- the SIVU for roads in the canton of Lembeye
- the Energy association of Pyrénées-Atlantiques
- the inter-communal association for the supply of drinking water of Vic-Bilh Montanérès

== Demography ==
Historical population

Year	Pop.	±% p.a.
1793	132	—
1821	150	+0.46%
1846	240	+1.90%
1872	205	−0.60%
1901	178	−0.49%
1926	115	−1.73%
1946	108	−0.31%
1962	95	−0.80%
1968	75	−3.86%

Year	Pop.	±% p.a.
1975	76	+0.19%
1982	77	+0.19%
1990	76	−0.16%
1999	72	−0.60%
2007	73	+0.17%
2012	72	−0.28%
2017	66	−1.73%
2023	64	−0.51%

Source: EHESS and INSEE

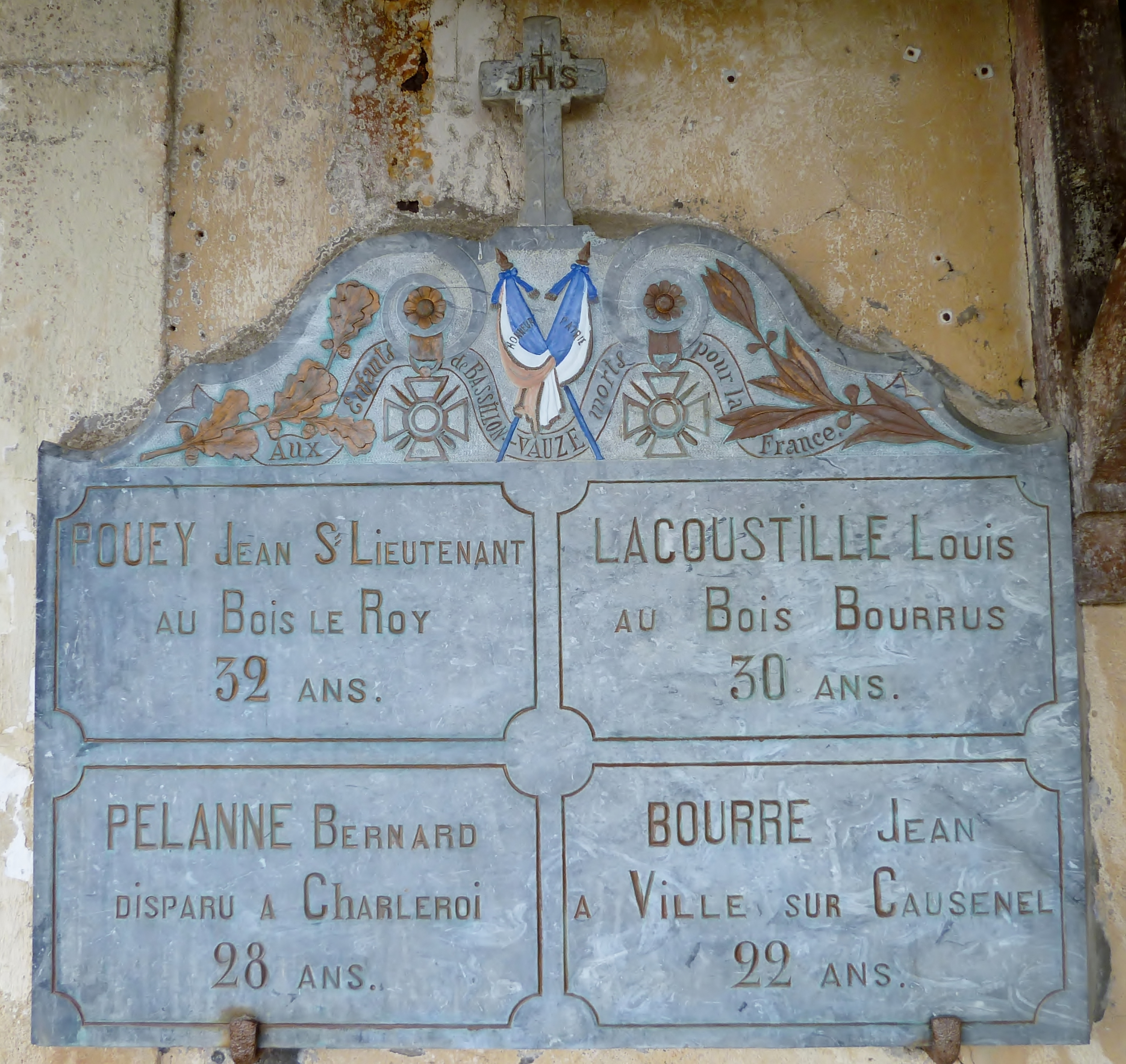
The War Memorial plaque on the church

== Economy ==
The commune is located in the appellation d'origine contrôlée (AOC) zone of Pacherenc-du-vic-bilh white wine.

== Culture and heritage ==
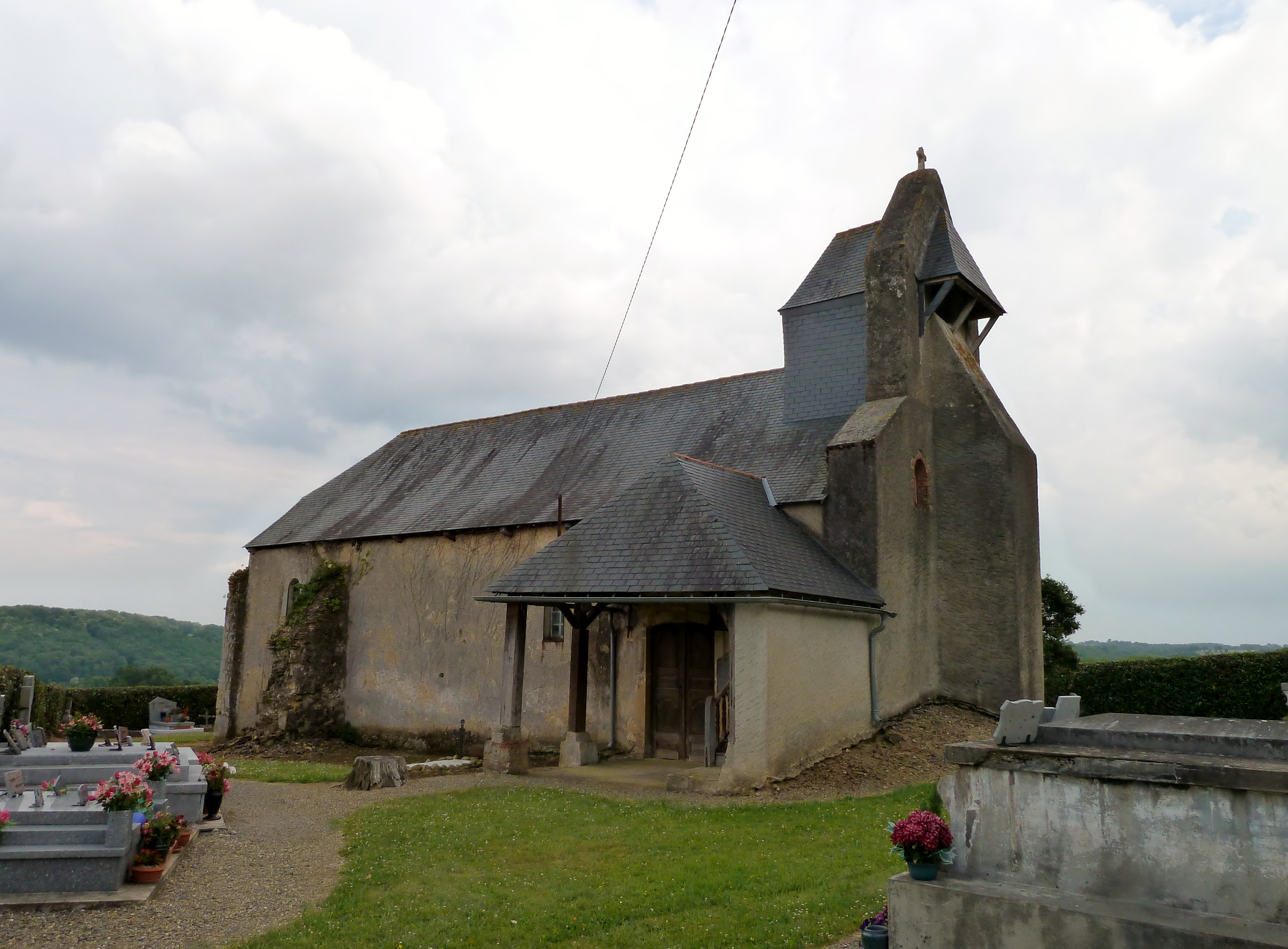
The Church of Saint-Girons

=== Civil heritage ===
The commune has a number of buildings and sites that are registered as historical monuments:

- The Maison Laïus Farmhouse (1765)
- Houses and Farms (18th-19th century)
- A Fountain (1833)
- A Fortified Complex (Prehistoric)

=== Religious heritage ===
The commune has several religious buildings and sites that are registered as historical monuments:

- A Presbytery (1853)
- The Parish Church of Saint Girons at Bassillon (1783) The Church contains several items that are registered as historical objects:
  - 2 Statues (19th century)
  - A Pulpit (18th century)
  - 2 Stoups (18th century)
  - A Stoup (18th century)
  - Stained glass windows (19th century)
- The Parish Church of Saint-Barthélémy at Vauzé (1773) The Church contains several items that are registered as historical objects:
  - A Stations of the Cross (19th century)
  - 4 Altar Candlesticks (18th century)
  - A Stoup (18th century)

== See also ==
- Communes of the Pyrénées-Atlantiques department
