= Astis =

- Commune
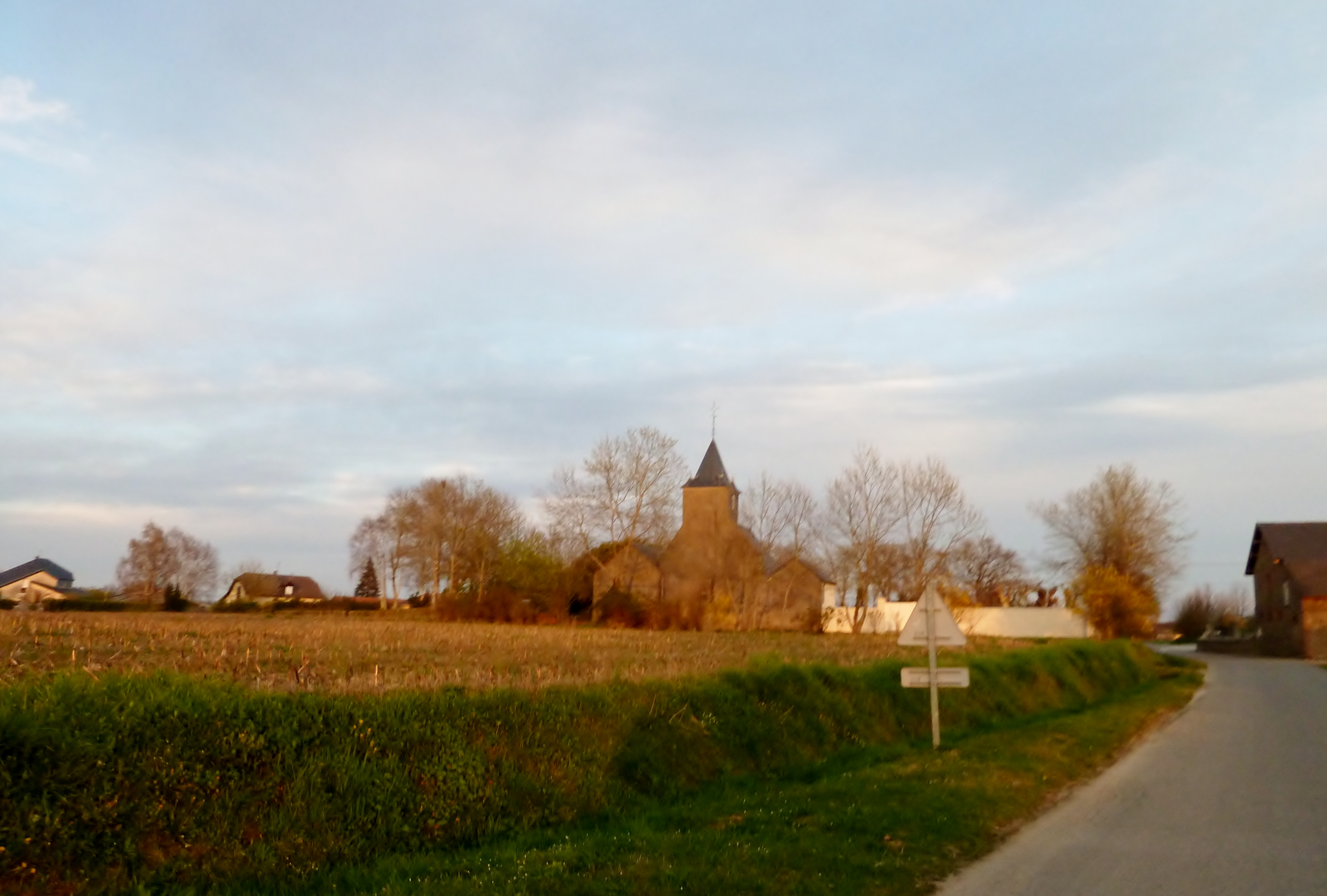
- View of the village

- Coat of arms
- Location of Astis
- Location within France Location within Nouvelle-Aquitaine
- Coordinates: 43°26′31″N 0°19′37″W
- Country: France
- Region: Nouvelle-Aquitaine
- Department: Pyrénées-Atlantiques
- Arrondissement: Pau
- Canton: Terres des Luys et Coteaux du Vic-Bilh
- Intercommunality: CC Luys en Béarn

Government
  - Mayor (2020–2026): Alain Caïe
- Area^{1}: 3.16 km^{2} (1.22 sq mi)
- Elevation: 234 m (768 ft)
- Highest elevation: 242 m (794 ft)
- Lowest elevation: 160 m (520 ft)
- Population (2023): 353
  - Density: 112/km^{2} (289/sq mi)
- Time zone: UTC+01:00 (CET)
  - Summer (DST): UTC+02:00 (CEST)
- INSEE/Postal code: 64070 /64450
- ^{1} French Land Register data, which excludes lakes, ponds, glaciers > 1 km^{2} (0.386 sq mi or 247 acres) and river estuaries.

Astis (Astís in Occitan) is a commune in the Pyrénées-Atlantiques department in the Nouvelle-Aquitaine region of south-western France.

== Geography ==
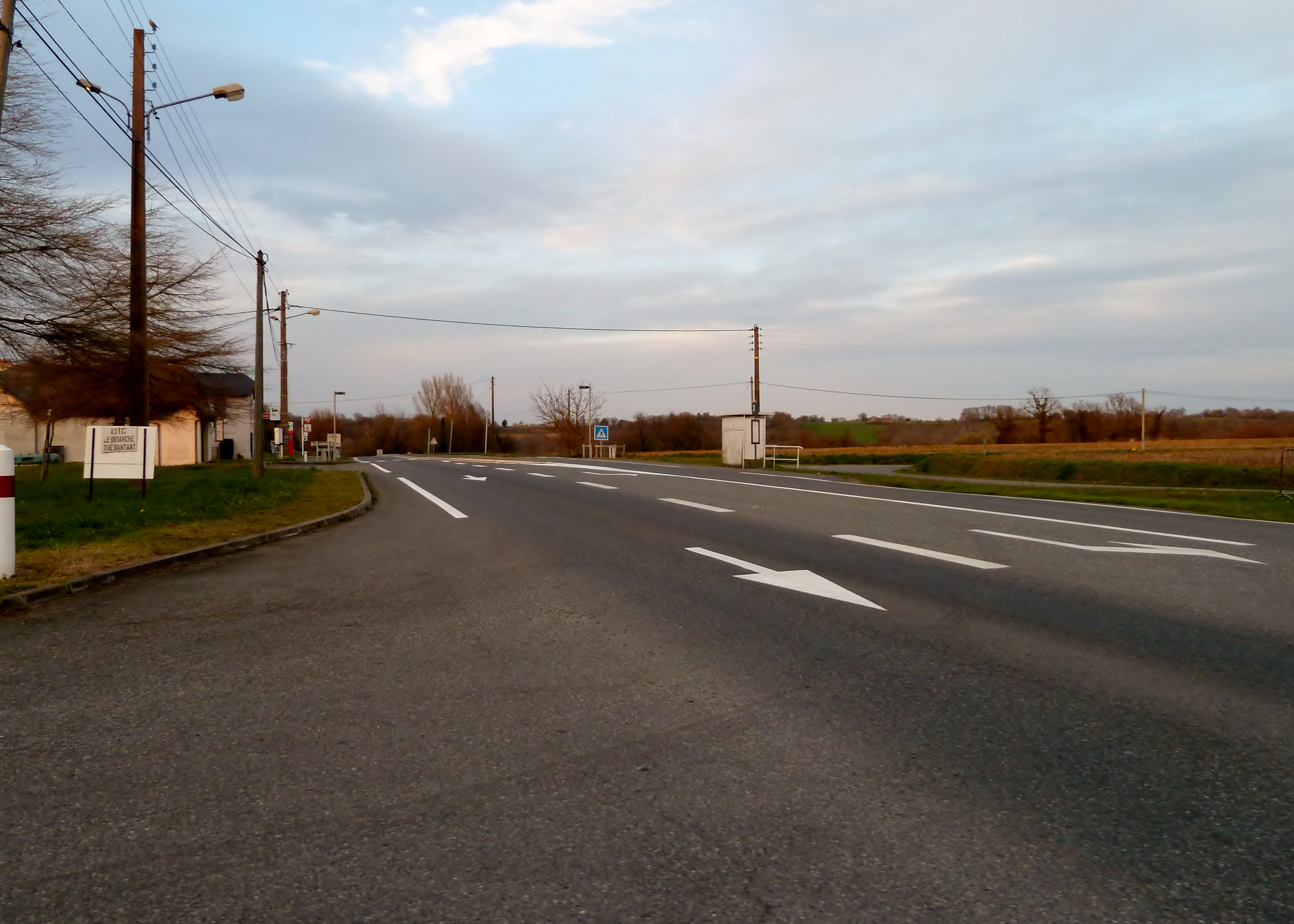
The D834 at Astis

Astis is located some 20 km north of Pau and some 4 km south of Miossens-Lanusse. Access to the commune is by road D834 (Route de Bordeaux) from Pau entering the commune from the south-west passing through the village and continuing north to Sarron. The D39 road (Route de Morlaas) branches off the D834 in the north of the commune and goes south-east to Anos. The commune has a strip of forest along the length of the commune from north-west to south-east, parallel to the Route de Morlaas with the rest of the commune farmland.

The Luy de France forms the eastern border of the commune as it flows north eventually joining the Luy de Béarn and becoming the Luy river on the eastern border of Castel-Sarrazin commune. The Basta river rises in the south of the commune and flows north-west joining the Luy de France north of the commune.

=== Places and hamlets ===
- Anos
- Baradat
- Bernadot
- La Caserne
- Château
- Chinchin
- Dibet
- Guichanné
- Jacoulet
- Lamazou
- Nabarrot
- Pascal
- Plantié
- Sarrette
- Sarthoulet
- Sébat
- Tauhuré

== Toponymy ==
The commune name in béarnais is also Astis. Michel Grosclaude proposed a Gascon etymology es (an old definitive article) followed by t(h)in ("Dependence") or tin ("singer").

The following table details the origins of the commune name:

Name	Spelling	Date	Source	Page	Origin	Description
Astis	Estis	1385	Raymond	16	Census	Village
	Astis	1750	Cassini		Cassini Map	

Sources

- Raymond: Topographic Dictionary of the Department of Basses-Pyrenees, 1863, on the page numbers indicated in the table. (in French)
- Grosclaude: Toponymic Dictionary of communes, Béarn, 2006 (in French)
- Census: Census of Béarn
- Cassini Map: Cassini Map from 1750

== Administration ==
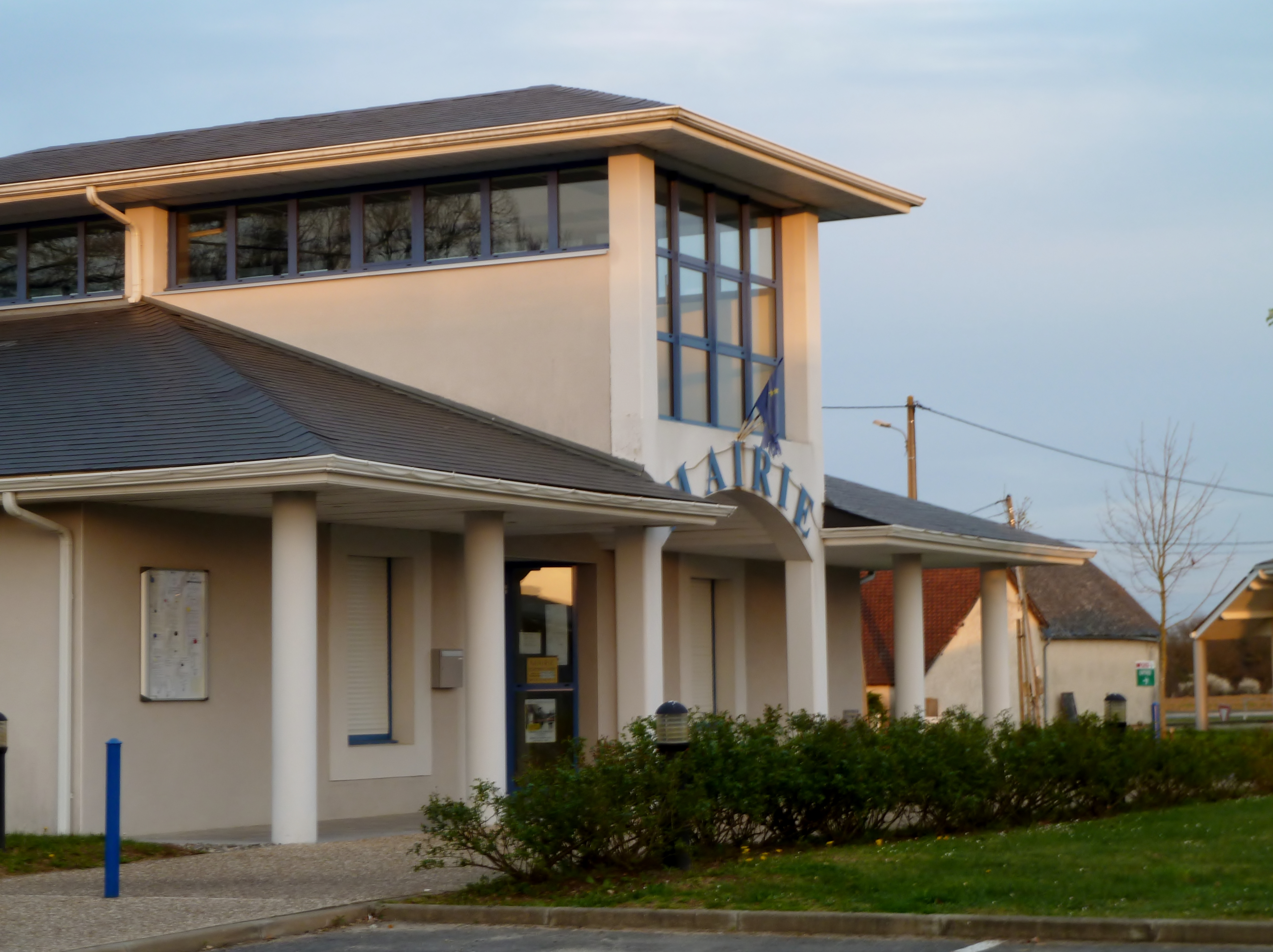
Astis Town Hall

List of Successive Mayors

From	To	Name
1790	1809	Jean Sabat
1809	1815	Jean Larrieu
1815	1828	Joseph Hondagne
1828	1830	Bernard Lamazou
1830	1868	Pierre Lamazou
1868	1871	Jean Larrieu
1871	1872	Félix Binde
1872	1878	Jean Larrieu Chinchin
1878	1919	Jean Lamazou
1919	1929	Jean Sebat
1929	1935	Julien Lamazou
1935	1944	Raymond Guichane
1944	1945	Julien Lamazou
1945	1959	Pierre Larrieu Bourdale
1959	1989	Albert Lafitte
1989	2014	Pierrette Barzu
2014	2026	Alain Caïe

=== Inter-communality ===
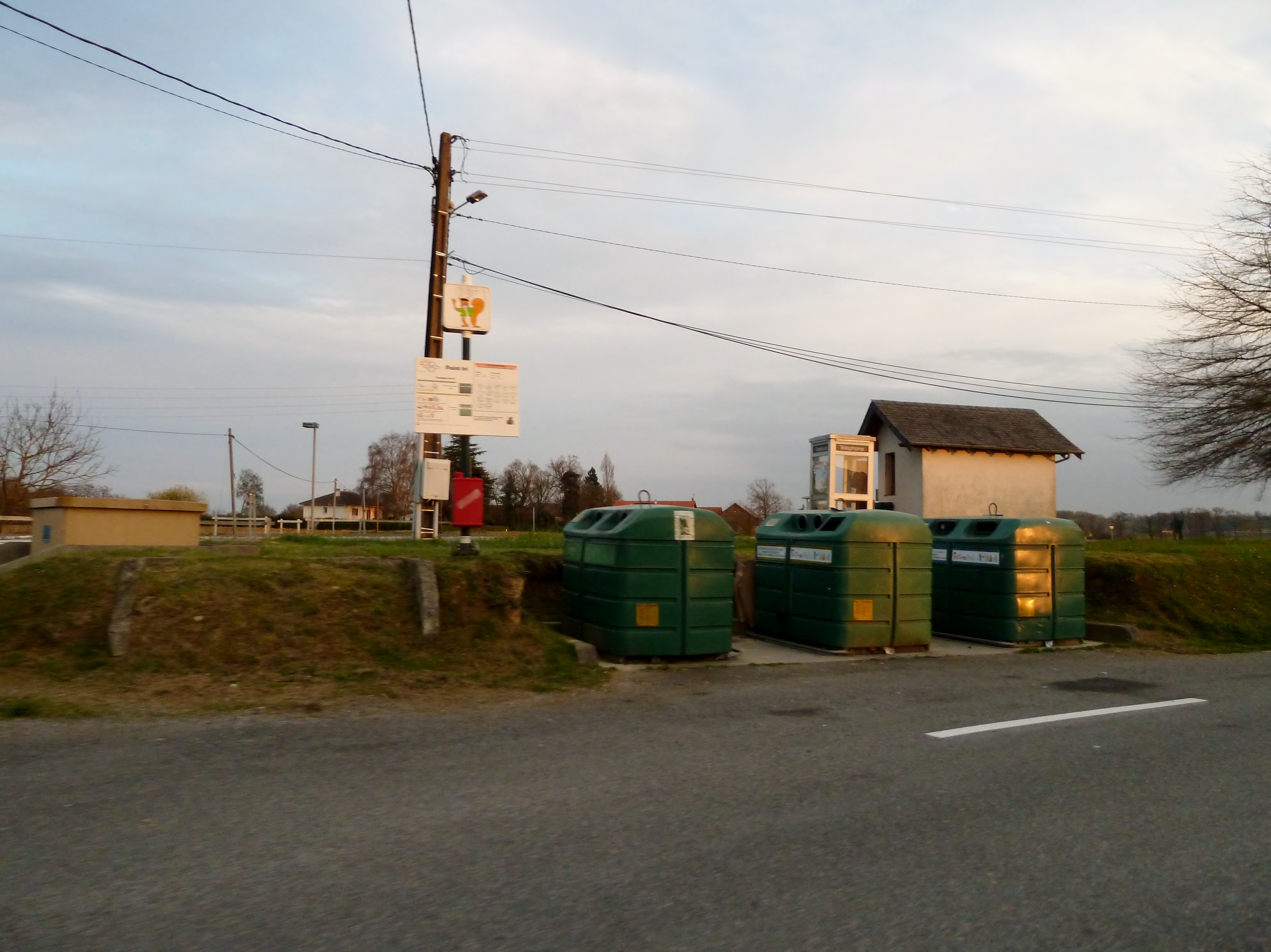
Recycling centre at Astis

The commune is part of four inter-communal structures:

- the Communauté de communes des Luys en Béarn;
- the AEP association of the regions of Luy and Gabas;
- the Energy association of Pyrénées-Atlantiques;
- the scholastic association Argelos-Astis;

== Demography ==
The inhabitants of the commune are known as Astisiens or Astisiennes in French.

Historical population

Year	Pop.	±% p.a.
1793	157	—
1821	175	+0.39%
1846	225	+1.01%
1872	170	−1.07%
1901	190	+0.38%
1926	140	−1.21%
1946	119	−0.81%
1962	111	−0.43%
1968	101	−1.56%

Year	Pop.	±% p.a.
1975	98	−0.43%
1982	163	+7.54%
1990	198	+2.46%
1999	266	+3.33%
2007	293	+1.22%
2012	312	+1.26%
2017	306	−0.39%
2023	353	+2.41%

Source: EHESS and INSEE

== Culture and heritage ==
=== Civil heritage ===
The commune has a number of buildings and structures that are registered as historical monuments:

- A Chateau (19th century)
- The Maison Mouras Farmhouse (1771)
- A Farmhouse at Lamazou (1646)
- The Maison Larrieu Farmhouse (17th century)
- The Maison Lassus Farmhouse (1894)
- Houses and Farms (17th-19th centuries)
- A Fortified Complex (Prehistoric)

=== Religious heritage ===
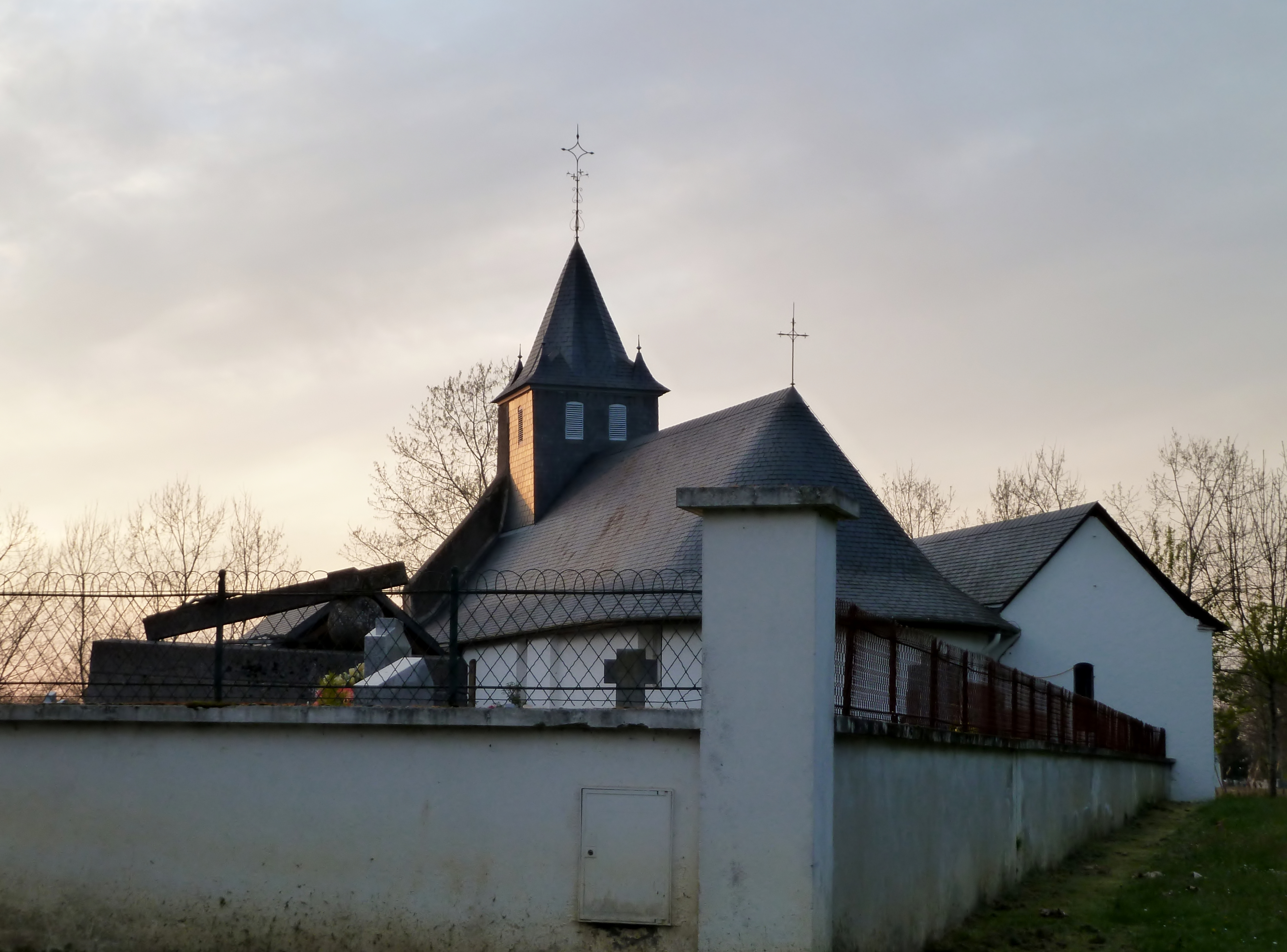
The Church of Saint John the Baptist

The Church of Saint John the Baptist (12th century) is registered as a historical monument.

The Church contains many items that are registered as historical objects:

- A Bronze Bell (1591)
- Furniture in the Church
- A Bronze Bell in the bell tower (1591)
- A Ciborium (19th century)
- 2 Altar Candlesticks (19th century)
- 2 Altar Candlesticks (19th century)
- 2 Altar Candlesticks (torch bodies) (19th century)
- A Painting: Saint John in the desert (18th century)
- A Worship bench (19th century)
- Baptismal fonts (19th century)
- 2 Statues: Saint Peter & Saint John (18th century)
- Bas-relief: Christ on the cross between Saint Madeleine & Saint John (18th century)
- A Retable (18th century)
- Altar seating and Tabernacle (18th century)
- Main Altar Seating, Tabernacle, and Retable

== Heraldry ==
Arms of Astis	Tierced in reversed pairle: 1st vert, an ear of corn or; 2nd or, two cows gules, horned, collared and belled azure, one above the other; 3rd azure, three wavy fesses argent and the Paschal lamb of the same, head turned to the sinister, holding a high cross or with a silver banner charged with a crosslet pattée gules, superimposed on the fesses.

== Facilities ==
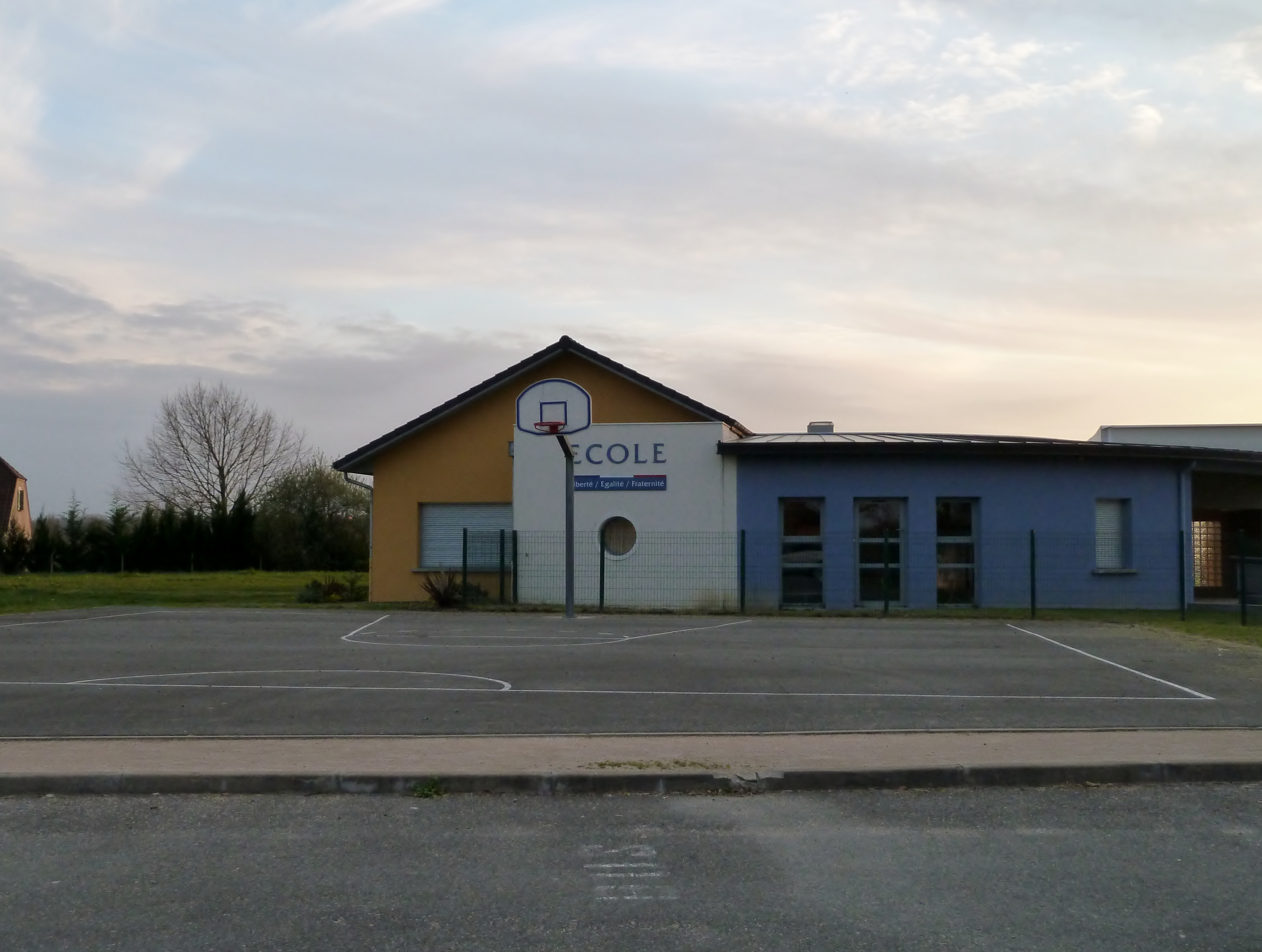
The School

Astis has a primary school which is shared with Argelos as an inter-communal educational grouping.

== See also ==
- Communes of the Pyrénées-Atlantiques department

=== External links ===
- Community of communes of Luys en Béarn (in French)
- Astis on Géoportail, National Geographic Institute (IGN) website (in French)
- Astis on the 1750 Cassini Map
