= Pomps =

- Commune
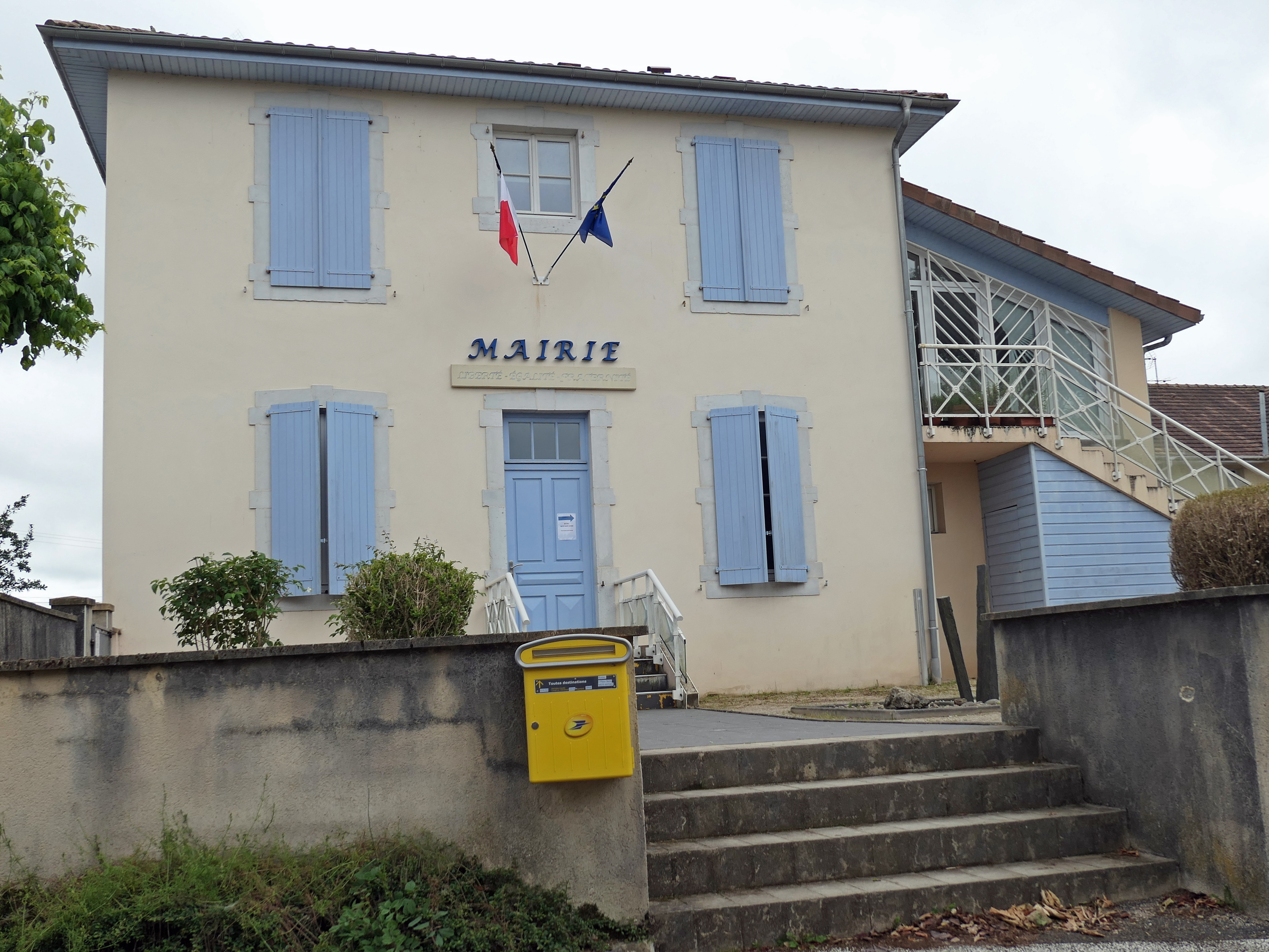
- Pomps Town hall
- Location of Pomps
- Location within France Location within Nouvelle-Aquitaine
- Coordinates: 43°29′32″N 0°32′25″W
- Country: France
- Region: Nouvelle-Aquitaine
- Department: Pyrénées-Atlantiques
- Arrondissement: Pau
- Canton: Artix et Pays de Soubestre
- Intercommunality: Luys en Béarn

Government
  - Mayor (2020–2026): Claude Fourquet
- Area^{1}: 7.77 km^{2} (3.00 sq mi)
- Elevation: 95 m (312 ft)
- Highest elevation: 138 m (453 ft)
- Lowest elevation: 90 m (300 ft)
- Population (2023): 295
  - Density: 38.0/km^{2} (98.3/sq mi)
- Time zone: UTC+01:00 (CET)
  - Summer (DST): UTC+02:00 (CEST)
- INSEE/Postal code: 64450 /64370
- ^{1} French Land Register data, which excludes lakes, ponds, glaciers > 1 km^{2} (0.386 sq mi or 247 acres) and river estuaries.

Pomps (French pronunciation: [pɔms]; Occitan: Poms) is a commune in the Pyrénées-Atlantiques département in south-western France.

== Geography ==
Pomps is located in the northeast of the département, and lies about 20 kilometers to the north of the cities of Béarn and Pau.

=== Transportation ===
Pomps is served by county roads (French: "routes départmentales") 945 and 946.

=== Neighboring Communities ===
- Morlanne to the north
- Hagetaubin to the northwest
- Géus-d'Arzacq and Bouillon to the east
- Arthez-de-Béarn to the east
- Arnos to the south east
- Castillon (Canton d'Arthez-de-Béarn) to the southwest
- Doazon to the south

== History ==
The name of the commune of Pomps has appeared throughout time as Poms in the 14th century, and later, in the year 1443, as Pombs.

== Administration ==
Mayors of Pomps
Took office	Left office	Name
1971	1995	Laurent Camguilhem
1995	incumbent	Claude Fourquet

== Demographics ==
For statistical purposes, Pomps is considered a part of the functional urban area (aire d'attraction des villes) of Pau. An individual from Pomps is known as Pompsois in French.

Historical population

Year	Pop.	±% p.a.
1793	311	—
1821	359	+0.51%
1846	406	+0.49%
1872	346	−0.61%
1901	293	−0.57%
1926	208	−1.36%
1946	203	−0.12%
1962	226	+0.67%
1968	197	−2.26%

Year	Pop.	±% p.a.
1975	173	−1.84%
1982	173	+0.00%
1990	176	+0.22%
1999	179	+0.19%
2007	225	+2.90%
2012	263	+3.17%
2017	290	+1.97%
2023	295	+0.29%

Source: EHESS and INSEE (1968-2023)

== See also ==
- Communes of the Pyrénées-Atlantiques department
