= Maumusson =

Maumusson is the name or part of the name of the following communes in France:

- Maumusson, Loire-Atlantique, in the Loire-Atlantique department
- Maumusson, Tarn-et-Garonne, in the Tarn-et-Garonne department
- Maumusson-Laguian, in the Gers department
- Baliracq-Maumusson, in the Pyrénées-Atlantiques department
