= Gayon =

Gayon may refer to:

== People ==
- Fernando Cos-Gayón (1825–1898), Spanish journalist and politician
- Gayon Evans Evans (born 1990), Jamaican sprinter
- Roberto Gayón Márquez (born 1905), Mexican football forward

== Places ==
- Gayon, Pyrénées-Atlantiques, France

== Other ==
- Gayon language, extinct language of western Venezuela
