= Baliracq-Maumusson =

- Commune
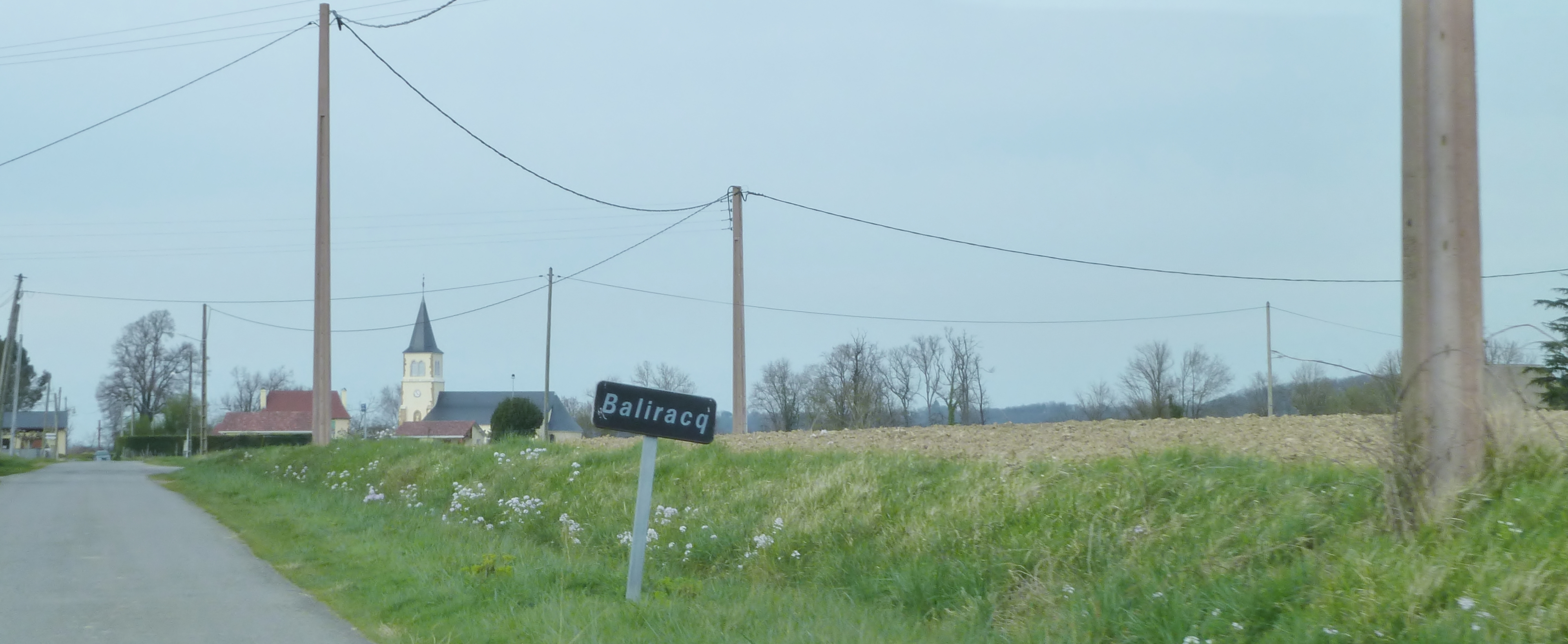
- Entry to Baliracq
- Location of Baliracq-Maumusson
- Location within France Location within Nouvelle-Aquitaine
- Coordinates: 43°32′48″N 0°15′14″W
- Country: France
- Region: Nouvelle-Aquitaine
- Department: Pyrénées-Atlantiques
- Arrondissement: Pau
- Canton: Terres des Luys et Coteaux du Vic-Bilh
- Intercommunality: Luys en Béarn

Government
  - Mayor (2020–2026): Sylvain Sergent
- Area^{1}: 6.06 km^{2} (2.34 sq mi)
- Elevation: 132 m (433 ft)
- Highest elevation: 224 m (735 ft)
- Lowest elevation: 120 m (390 ft)
- Population (2023): 120
  - Density: 20/km^{2} (51/sq mi)
- Time zone: UTC+01:00 (CET)
  - Summer (DST): UTC+02:00 (CEST)
- INSEE/Postal code: 64090 /64330
- ^{1} French Land Register data, which excludes lakes, ponds, glaciers > 1 km^{2} (0.386 sq mi or 247 acres) and river estuaries.

Baliracq-Maumusson (French pronunciation: [baliʁak momysɔ̃]; Occitan: Valirac e Maumosson) is a commune of the Pyrénées-Atlantiques department in the Nouvelle-Aquitaine region of south-western France.

== Geography ==
Baliracq-Maumusson is located some 45 km east by north-east of Orthez and 20 km south of Aire-sur-l'Adour. Access to the commune is by the D211 road from Lannecaube in the south which passes through the length of the commune along the eastern side to join the D41 just north of the commune. Access to the village of Baliracq is by Le Moulin road branching from the D211. The commune is mixed forest and farmland.

The Lées river forms the eastern border of the commune as it flows north to join the Adour near Aire-sur-l'Adour. The Gabassot forms the northern border of the commune as it flows east into the Lées. Two other streams rise in the commune and flow into the Lées.

=== Places and hamlets ===
- Arnathau
- Baliracq
- Bitaillou
- Bouquehort
- Bourdé
- Campagne
- Castéra
- Crédey
- Florence
- Gayas
- Hau
- Hilletou
- La Hount
- Lafon
- Lanne
- Laroujat
- Lescribau
- Maufinet
- Maumusson
- Miqueu
- Mombet
- Moncade
- Mounicou
- Mourette
- Naba
- Pédeuboscq
- Pédélatour
- Pillou
- Pourrio
- Sansot
- Tardan

== Toponymy ==
According to Michel Grosclaude the name Baliracq probably came from a Latin man's name Valerus with the Gallo-Roman suffix -acum giving the "Domain of Valerus". For Maumusson he proposed a Gascon man's name: the nickname mau meaning "bad" combined with mus meaning "nose" and the suffix -on giving "unfriendly" or "sullen".

The following table details the origins of the commune name and other names in the commune.

Name	Spelling	Date	Source	Page	Origin	Description
Baliracq	Saint-Félix de Balirac	10th century	Raymond	20	Marca	Village
	Vallirag	1100	Grosclaude			
	Valliracum	1100	Grosclaude			
	Balirag	1443	Raymond	20	Carresse	
	Baliracq	1750	Cassini			
	Balirac	1801	Ldh/EHESS/Cassini		Bulletin des lois	
	Balirac	1863	Raymond	20		
Maumusson	Maumusson	1750	Cassini			Village
	Maumussou	1774	Raymond	110	Terrier	
Castéra	Casterar	1542	Raymond	44	Reformation	Farm

Sources:

- Raymond: Topographic Dictionary of the Department of Basses-Pyrenees, 1863, on the page numbers indicated in the table. (in French)
- Grosclaude: Toponymic Dictionary of communes, Béarn, 2006 (in French)
- Cassini: Cassini Map from 1750
- Ldh/EHESS/Cassini: Des villages de Cassini aux communes d'aujourd'hui: Commune data sheet Baliracq-Maumusson, EHESS (in French).

Origins:

- Marca: Pierre de Marca, History of Béarn.
- Carresse:
- Terrier: Terrier of Baliracq, E 177
- Reformation: Reformation of Béarn

== History ==
Paul Raymond noted on page 20 of his 1863 dictionary that Baliracq was a vassal of the Viscounts of Béarn.

The communes of Baliracq and Maumusson were merged in 1828.

== Administration ==
List of Successive Mayors

Mayors from the French Revolution to 1933

From	To	Name
1792	1795	Jean Sansot
1792	1796	Pierre Sartou
1795	1797	Jean Sarraille
1796	1797	Jacques Monsegu-Castera
1797	1798	Raymond Peyroutel
1797	1798	Pierre Sartou
1798	1803	Jean Sarraille
1798	1799	Pierre Miqueu
1799	1805	Pierre Boucahort
1803	1826	Germain Florence
1805	1808	Pascal Florence
1808	1809	Jean Borie
1809	1811	Jean Manaud
1811	1812	Jean Borie
1812	1813	Fils Lescriba
1813	1817	Jean Borie
1817	1821	Jean Manaud
1821	1835	Jean Fils Manaud
1835	1837	Jean Pierre Sarthou
1837	1840	Adrien Alexandre de Malden
1841	1848	Jean Manaud
1848	1882	Henry Croedey
1882	1888	Pierre Mirande
1888	1894	Jean Sansous
1894	1896	Bernard Castet
1896	1900	Jean Sansous
1900	1925	Charles Sansous
1925	1929	Jacques Cassoulong
1929	1933	Max Croedey

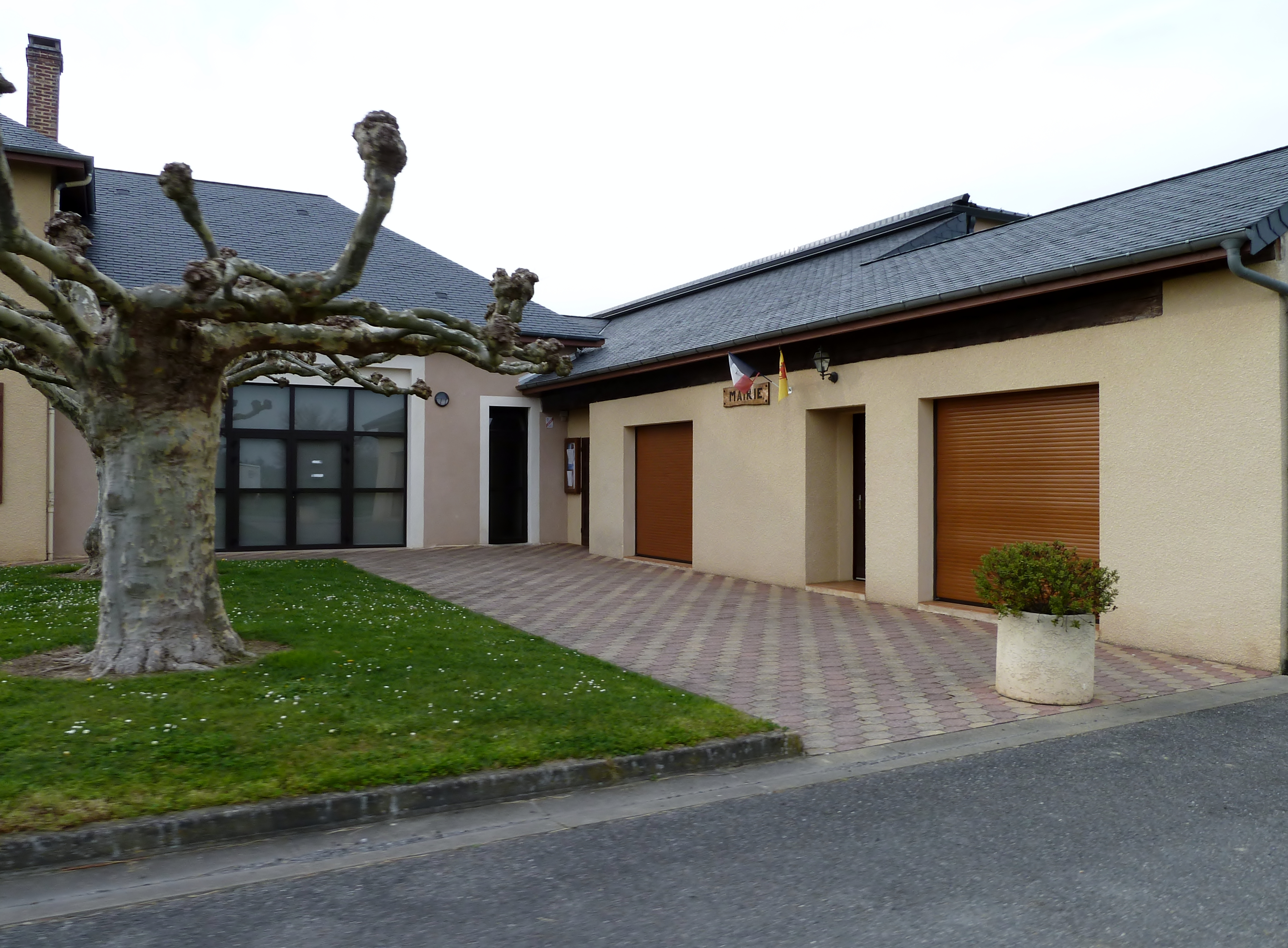
The Town Hall in Baliracq

Mayors from 1933

From	To	Name
1933	1944	Jacques Cassoulong
1944	1944	Charles Honoré
1944	1947	Jean Barreyat
1947	1989	Albert Sansous
1989	2014	Yvan Duviau
2014	2026	Sylvain Sergent

=== Inter-communality ===
The commune is part of six inter-communal structures:

- the Communauté de communes des Luys en Béarn;
- the SIVU for roads in the Garlin region;
- the SIVU for the Lées and its tributaries;
- the Energy association of Pyrénées-Atlantiques;
- the inter-communal association for the supply of drinking water for Luy-Gabas-Lées;
- the inter-communal association of Five Rivers;

== Demography ==
The inhabitants of the commune are known as Baliracois or Baliracoises in French.

Historical population

Year	Pop.	±% p.a.
1793	281	—
1821	364	+0.93%
1846	411	+0.49%
1872	325	−0.90%
1901	231	−1.17%
1926	188	−0.82%
1946	183	−0.13%
1962	149	−1.28%
1968	123	−3.15%

Year	Pop.	±% p.a.
1975	111	−1.46%
1982	124	+1.59%
1990	113	−1.15%
1999	115	+0.20%
2007	126	+1.15%
2012	145	+2.85%
2017	122	−3.40%
2023	120	−0.28%

Source: EHESS and INSEE

== Culture and heritage ==
=== Civil heritage ===
The commune has a number of buildings and structures that are registered as historical monuments:

- A Mill at Baliracq (1764)
- A Farmhouse at Baliracq-Bouquehort (19th century)
- The Coussié House at Maumusson-Tardan (1742)
- The Castéra House at Baliracq-Castéra (1742)
- The Lafon House at Maumusson-Crédey (17th century)
- The Sansot House at Maumusson-Sansot (19th century)
- The Chateau de Milly at Maumusson-Florence (18th century)
- Houses and Farms (18th-19th century)
- A Fortified Area (Middle Ages)
- A Fortified Complex (Prehistoric). At a place called Castera the topography has been visibly altered by the hand of man as evidenced by the presence of an ancient fortified complex with major embankments and a circular walkway which is still visible. This could be for high wooden stakes joined together because no stone remains have been found. The works could therefore date to the high Middle Ages although there could be prehistoric remains.

=== Religious heritage ===
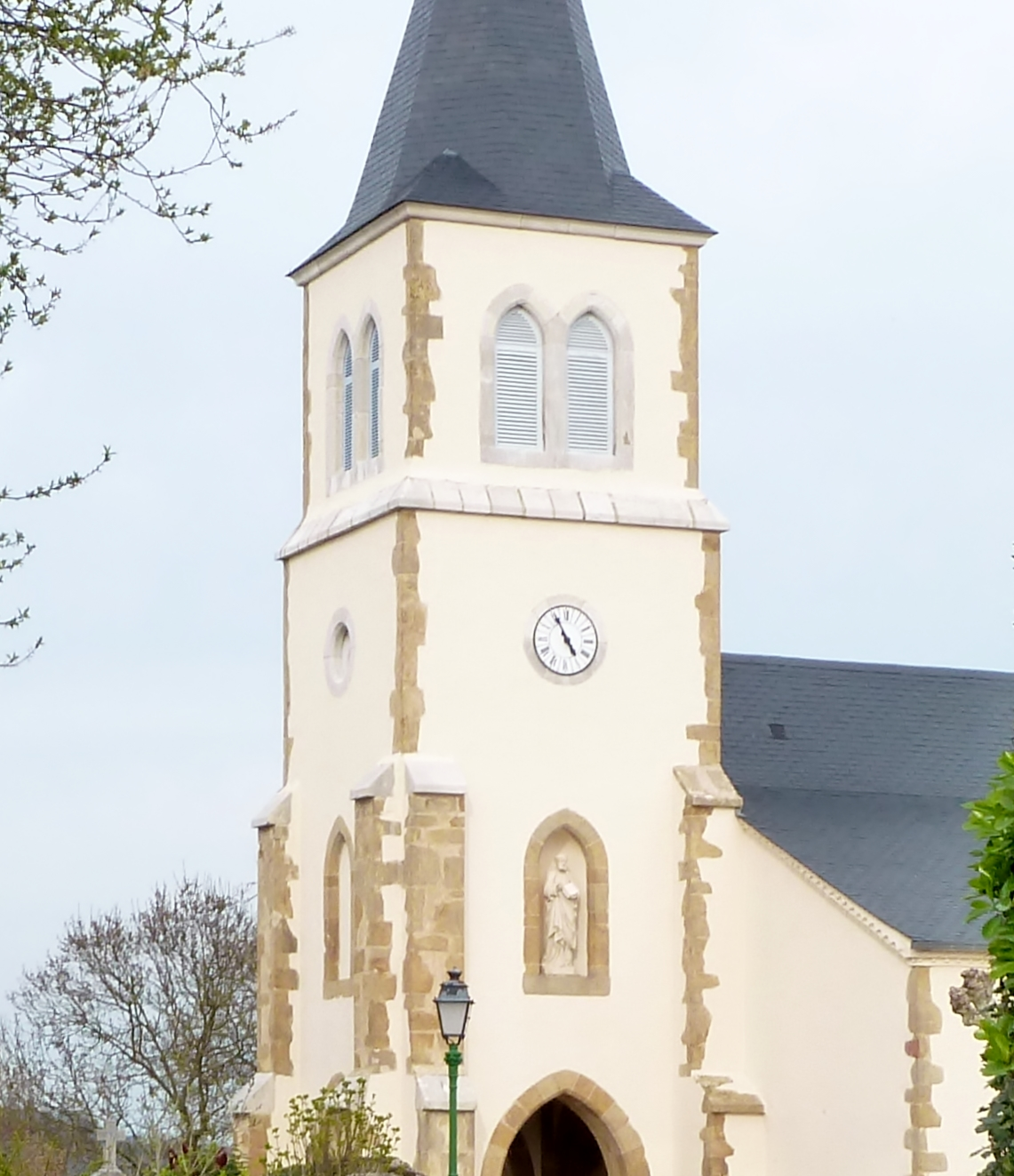
The Parish Church of Saint Peter

The Parish Church of Saint Peter (11th century) is registered as an historical monument. The Church contains many items that are registered as historical objects:

- An Altar, Tabernacle, and Statue (19th century)
- 2 Statues: Saints Felix and Peter (18th century)
- A Tabernacle (17th century)
- An Altar Painting: Remission of the keys to Saint Peter (19th century)
- An Altar and Retable (1844)
- Wood Panelling (1844)
- A Wayside Cross (19th century)
- An Altar Vase (20th century)
- A Monstrance (18th century)
- An Altar Candlestick (19th century)
- 6 Altar Candlesticks (18th century)
- A Thurible
- A Celebrant's Chair (18th century)
- A Stoup (1822)
- A Pulpit (18th century)
- A Confessional (18th century)
- The Choir Enclosure (1840)

== See also ==
- Communes of the Pyrénées-Atlantiques department
