= Arrondissement of Pau =

Coordinates: 43.30°N 0.37°W

Pau
- Arrondissement
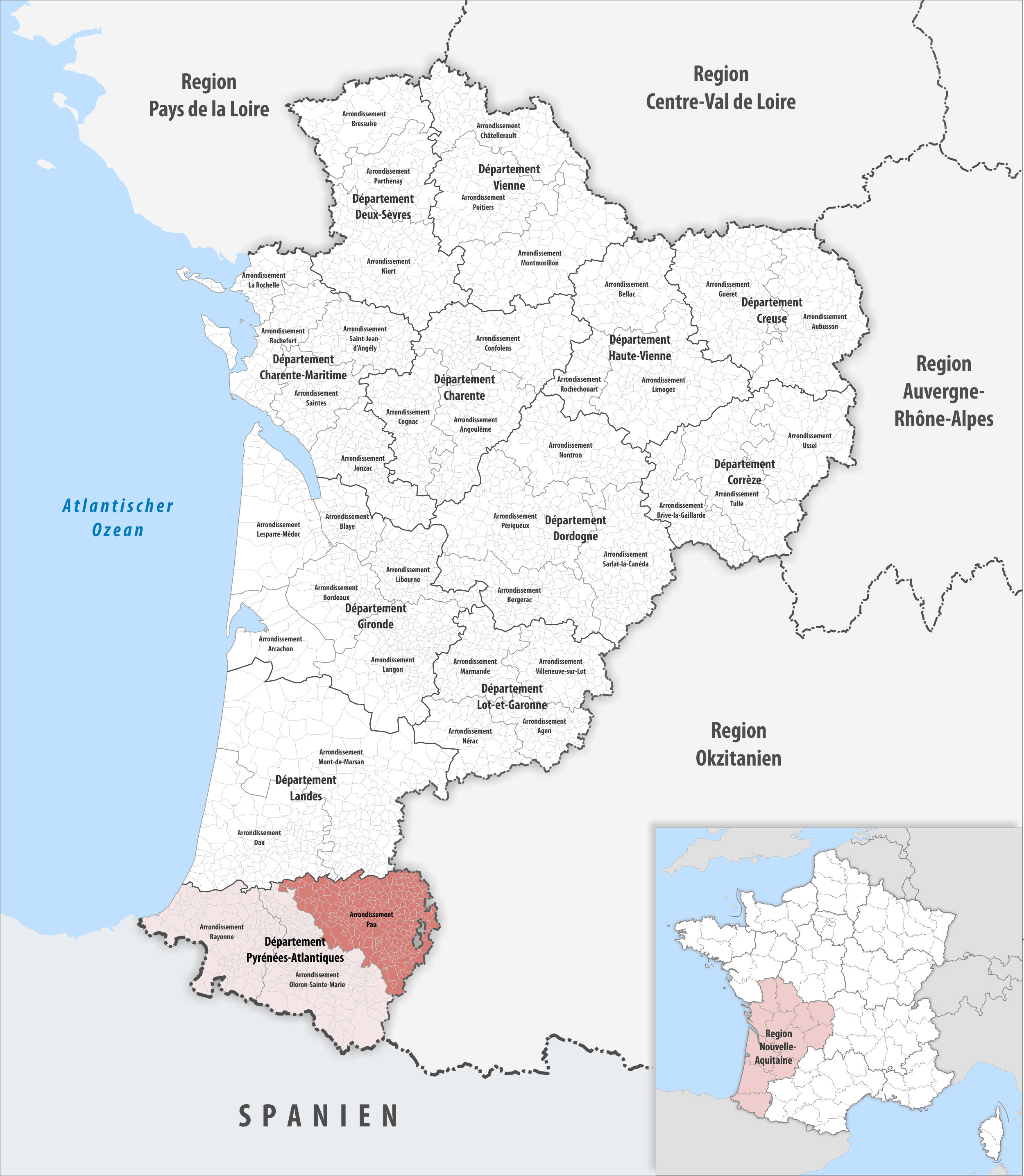
- Location within the region Nouvelle-Aquitaine
- Country: France
- Region: Nouvelle-Aquitaine
- Department: Pyrénées-Atlantiques
- No. of communes: {{{nbcomm}}}
- Area: 2,548.9 km^{2} (984.1 sq mi)
- Population (2023): 317,262
  - Density: 124.47/km^{2} (322.38/sq mi)
- INSEE code: 643

The arrondissement of Pau (French: Arrondissement de Pau, Occitan: Distrito de Pau Basque: Paueko barrutia) is an arrondissement of France in the Pyrénées-Atlantiques department in the Nouvelle-Aquitaine region. It has 268 communes. Its population is 311,949 (2021), and its area is 2,548.9 km^{2} (984.1 sq mi).

== Composition ==
The communes of the arrondissement of Pau, and their INSEE codes, are:

1. Aast (64001)
2. Abère (64002)
3. Abidos (64003)
4. Abos (64005)
5. Andoins (64021)
6. Angaïs (64023)
7. Anos (64027)
8. Anoye (64028)
9. Arbus (64037)
10. Aressy (64041)
11. Argagnon (64042)
12. Argelos (64043)
13. Arget (64044)
14. Arnos (64048)
15. Arricau-Bordes (64052)
16. Arrien (64053)
17. Arros-de-Nay (64054)
18. Arrosès (64056)
19. Arthez-d'Asson (64058)
20. Arthez-de-Béarn (64057)
21. Artigueloutan (64059)
22. Artiguelouve (64060)
23. Artix (64061)
24. Arzacq-Arraziguet (64063)
25. Assat (64067)
26. Asson (64068)
27. Astis (64070)
28. Aubertin (64072)
29. Aubin (64073)
30. Aubous (64074)
31. Auga (64077)
32. Auriac (64078)
33. Aurions-Idernes (64079)
34. Aussevielle (64080)
35. Aydie (64084)
36. Baigts-de-Béarn (64087)
37. Balansun (64088)
38. Baleix (64089)
39. Baliracq-Maumusson (64090)
40. Baliros (64091)
41. Barinque (64095)
42. Barzun (64097)
43. Bassillon-Vauzé (64098)
44. Baudreix (64101)
45. Bédeille (64103)
46. Bellocq (64108)
47. Bénéjacq (64109)
48. Bentayou-Sérée (64111)
49. Bernadets (64114)
50. Bésingrand (64117)
51. Bétracq (64118)
52. Beuste (64119)
53. Beyrie-en-Béarn (64121)
54. Billère (64129)
55. Biron (64131)
56. Bizanos (64132)
57. Boeil-Bezing (64133)
58. Bonnut (64135)
59. Bordères (64137)
60. Bordes (64138)
61. Bosdarros (64139)
62. Boueilh-Boueilho-Lasque (64141)
63. Bougarber (64142)
64. Bouillon (64143)
65. Boumourt (64144)
66. Bourdettes (64145)
67. Bournos (64146)
68. Bruges-Capbis-Mifaget (64148)
69. Buros (64152)
70. Burosse-Mendousse (64153)
71. Cabidos (64158)
72. Cadillon (64159)
73. Cardesse (64165)
74. Carrère (64167)
75. Casteide-Cami (64171)
76. Casteide-Candau (64172)
77. Casteide-Doat (64173)
78. Castéra-Loubix (64174)
79. Castétis (64177)
80. Castetner (64179)
81. Castetpugon (64180)
82. Castillon (Canton of Arthez-de-Béarn) (64181)
83. Castillon (Canton of Lembeye) (64182)
84. Caubios-Loos (64183)
85. Cescau (64184)
86. Claracq (64190)
87. Coarraze (64191)
88. Conchez-de-Béarn (64192)
89. Corbère-Abères (64193)
90. Coslédaà-Lube-Boast (64194)
91. Coublucq (64195)
92. Crouseilles (64196)
93. Cuqueron (64197)
94. Denguin (64198)
95. Diusse (64199)
96. Doazon (64200)
97. Doumy (64203)
98. Escoubès (64208)
99. Escurès (64210)
100. Eslourenties-Daban (64211)
101. Espéchède (64212)
102. Espoey (64216)
103. Fichous-Riumayou (64226)
104. Gabaston (64227)
105. Gan (64230)
106. Garlède-Mondebat (64232)
107. Garlin (64233)
108. Garos (64234)
109. Gayon (64236)
110. Gelos (64237)
111. Ger (64238)
112. Gerderest (64239)
113. Géus-d'Arzacq (64243)
114. Gomer (64246)
115. Hagetaubin (64254)
116. Haut-de-Bosdarros (64257)
117. Higuères-Souye (64262)
118. Hours (64266)
119. Idron (64269)
120. Igon (64270)
121. Jurançon (64284)
122. Laà-Mondrans (64286)
123. Labastide-Cézéracq (64288)
124. Labastide-Monréjeau (64290)
125. Labatmale (64292)
126. Labatut-Figuières (64293)
127. Labeyrie (64295)
128. Lacadée (64296)
129. Lacommande (64299)
130. Lacq (64300)
131. Lagor (64301)
132. Lagos (64302)
133. Lahourcade (64306)
134. Lalongue (64307)
135. Lalonquette (64308)
136. Lamayou (64309)
137. Lannecaube (64311)
138. Lanneplaà (64312)
139. Laroin (64315)
140. Larreule (64318)
141. Lasclaveries (64321)
142. Lasserre (64323)
143. Lée (64329)
144. Lembeye (64331)
145. Lème (64332)
146. Lescar (64335)
147. Lespielle (64337)
148. Lespourcy (64338)
149. Lestelle-Bétharram (64339)
150. Limendous (64343)
151. Livron (64344)
152. Lombia (64346)
153. Lonçon (64347)
154. Lons (64348)
155. Loubieng (64349)
156. Lourenties (64352)
157. Louvigny (64355)
158. Luc-Armau (64356)
159. Lucarré (64357)
160. Lucgarier (64358)
161. Lucq-de-Béarn (64359)
162. Lussagnet-Lusson (64361)
163. Malaussanne (64365)
164. Mascaraàs-Haron (64366)
165. Maslacq (64367)
166. Maspie-Lalonquère-Juillacq (64369)
167. Maucor (64370)
168. Maure (64372)
169. Mazères-Lezons (64373)
170. Mazerolles (64374)
171. Meillon (64376)
172. Méracq (64380)
173. Mesplède (64382)
174. Mialos (64383)
175. Miossens-Lanusse (64385)
176. Mirepeix (64386)
177. Momas (64387)
178. Momy (64388)
179. Monassut-Audiracq (64389)
180. Moncaup (64390)
181. Moncla (64392)
182. Monein (64393)
183. Monpezat (64394)
184. Monségur (64395)
185. Mont (64396)
186. Montagut (64397)
187. Montaner (64398)
188. Montardon (64399)
189. Montaut (64400)
190. Mont-Disse (64401)
191. Morlaàs (64405)
192. Morlanne (64406)
193. Mouhous (64408)
194. Mourenx (64410)
195. Narcastet (64413)
196. Navailles-Angos (64415)
197. Nay (64417)
198. Noguères (64418)
199. Nousty (64419)
200. Orthez (64430)
201. Os-Marsillon (64431)
202. Ouillon (64438)
203. Ousse (64439)
204. Ozenx-Montestrucq (64440)
205. Parbayse (64442)
206. Pardies (64443)
207. Pardies-Piétat (64444)
208. Pau (64445)
209. Peyrelongue-Abos (64446)
210. Piets-Plasence-Moustrou (64447)
211. Poey-de-Lescar (64448)
212. Pomps (64450)
213. Ponson-Debat-Pouts (64451)
214. Ponson-Dessus (64452)
215. Pontacq (64453)
216. Pontiacq-Viellepinte (64454)
217. Portet (64455)
218. Pouliacq (64456)
219. Poursiugues-Boucoue (64457)
220. Puyoô (64461)
221. Ramous (64462)
222. Ribarrouy (64464)
223. Riupeyrous (64465)
224. Rontignon (64467)
225. Saint-Abit (64469)
226. Saint-Armou (64470)
227. Saint-Boès (64471)
228. Saint-Castin (64472)
229. Saint-Faust (64478)
230. Saint-Girons-en-Béarn (64479)
231. Saint-Jammes (64482)
232. Saint-Jean-Poudge (64486)
233. Saint-Laurent-Bretagne (64488)
234. Saint-Médard (64491)
235. Saint-Vincent (64498)
236. Salles-Mongiscard (64500)
237. Sallespisse (64501)
238. Samsons-Lion (64503)
239. Sarpourenx (64505)
240. Saubole (64507)
241. Sault-de-Navailles (64510)
242. Sauvagnon (64511)
243. Sauvelade (64512)
244. Séby (64514)
245. Sedze-Maubecq (64515)
246. Sedzère (64516)
247. Séméacq-Blachon (64517)
248. Sendets (64518)
249. Serres-Castet (64519)
250. Serres-Morlaàs (64520)
251. Serres-Sainte-Marie (64521)
252. Sévignacq (64523)
253. Simacourbe (64524)
254. Siros (64525)
255. Soumoulou (64526)
256. Tadousse-Ussau (64532)
257. Taron-Sadirac-Viellenave (64534)
258. Tarsacq (64535)
259. Thèze (64536)
260. Urost (64544)
261. Uzan (64548)
262. Uzein (64549)
263. Uzos (64550)
264. Vialer (64552)
265. Viellenave-d'Arthez (64554)
266. Vielleségure (64556)
267. Vignes (64557)
268. Viven (64560)

== History ==
The arrondissement of Pau was created in 1800. At the January 2017 reorganisation of the arrondissements of Pyrénées-Atlantiques, it gained 11 communes from the arrondissement of Oloron-Sainte-Marie, and it lost 11 communes to the arrondissement of Oloron-Sainte-Marie.

As a result of the reorganisation of the cantons of France which came into effect in 2015, the borders of the cantons are no longer related to the borders of the arrondissements. The cantons of the arrondissement of Pau were, as of January 2015:

1. Arthez-de-Béarn
2. Arzacq-Arraziguet
3. Billère
4. Garlin
5. Jurançon
6. Lagor
7. Lembeye
8. Lescar
9. Montaner
10. Morlaàs
11. Nay-Est
12. Nay-Ouest
13. Orthez
14. Pau-Centre
15. Pau-Est
16. Pau-Nord
17. Pau-Ouest
18. Pau-Sud
19. Pontacq
20. Salies-de-Béarn
21. Thèze
