= Moncaup, Pyrénées-Atlantiques =

Moncaup
- Commune
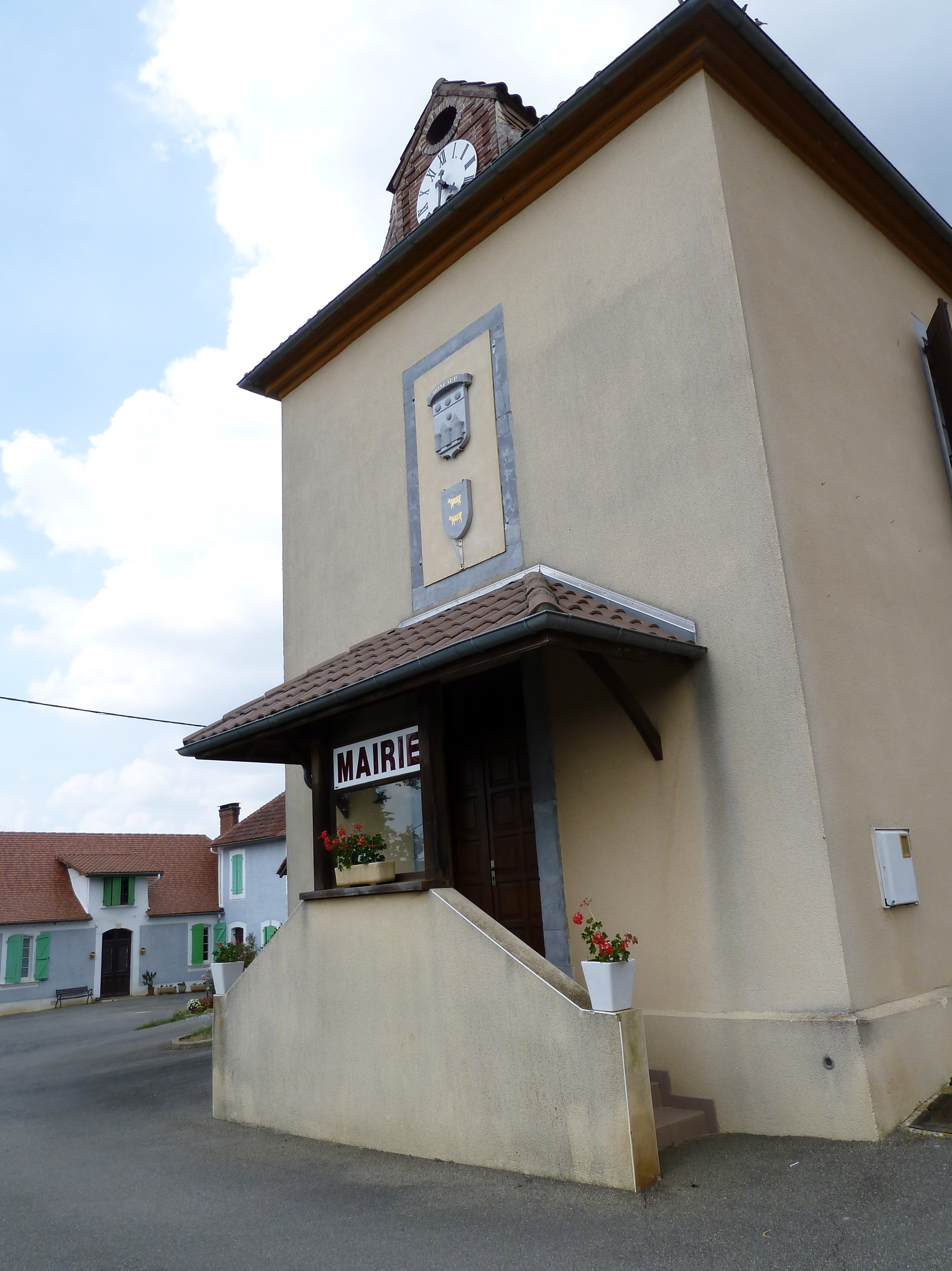
- The town hall of Moncaup

- Coat of arms
- Location of Moncaup
- Location within France Location within Nouvelle-Aquitaine
- Coordinates: 43°29′06″N 0°03′25″W
- Country: France
- Region: Nouvelle-Aquitaine
- Department: Pyrénées-Atlantiques
- Arrondissement: Pau
- Canton: Terres des Luys et Coteaux du Vic-Bilh
- Intercommunality: Nord-Est Béarn

Government
  - Mayor (2020–2026): Gabriel Hugues
- Area^{1}: 11.35 km^{2} (4.38 sq mi)
- Elevation: 260 m (850 ft)
- Highest elevation: 291 m (955 ft)
- Lowest elevation: 171 m (561 ft)
- Population (2023): 156
  - Density: 13.7/km^{2} (35.6/sq mi)
- Time zone: UTC+01:00 (CET)
  - Summer (DST): UTC+02:00 (CEST)
- INSEE/Postal code: 64390 /64350
- ^{1} French Land Register data, which excludes lakes, ponds, glaciers > 1 km^{2} (0.386 sq mi or 247 acres) and river estuaries.

Moncaup (French pronunciation: [mɔ̃ko]; Occitan: Montcauv) is a commune in the Pyrénées-Atlantiques department in south-western France.

== See also ==
- Communes of the Pyrénées-Atlantiques department
