= Serres-Castet =

- Commune
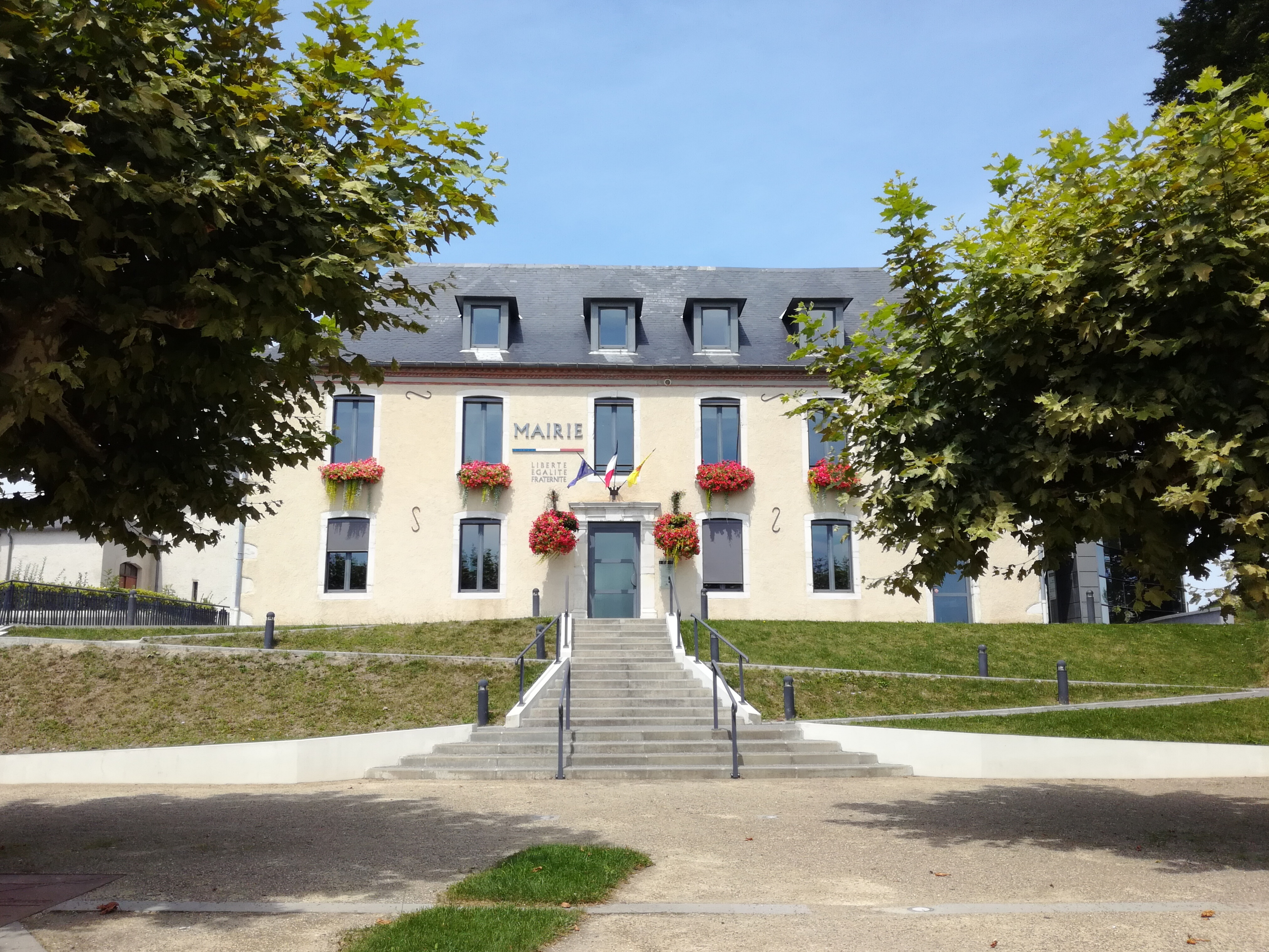
- The town hall of Serres-Castet
- Location of Serres-Castet
- Location within France Location within Nouvelle-Aquitaine
- Coordinates: 43°23′14″N 0°21′13″W
- Country: France
- Region: Nouvelle-Aquitaine
- Department: Pyrénées-Atlantiques
- Arrondissement: Pau
- Canton: Terres des Luys et Coteaux du Vic-Bilh
- Intercommunality: Luys en Béarn

Government
  - Mayor (2020–2026): Jean-Yves Courreges
- Area^{1}: 13.71 km^{2} (5.29 sq mi)
- Elevation: 236 m (774 ft)
- Highest elevation: 288 m (945 ft)
- Lowest elevation: 177 m (581 ft)
- Population (2023): 4,418
  - Density: 322.2/km^{2} (834.6/sq mi)
- Time zone: UTC+01:00 (CET)
  - Summer (DST): UTC+02:00 (CEST)
- INSEE/Postal code: 64519 /64121
- ^{1} French Land Register data, which excludes lakes, ponds, glaciers > 1 km^{2} (0.386 sq mi or 247 acres) and river estuaries.

Serres-Castet (French pronunciation: [sɛʁ kastɛ]; Occitan: Sèrras Castèth) is a commune in the Pyrénées-Atlantiques department in south-western France.

== Population ==
Historical population
Year	Pop.	±% p.a.
1968	749	—
1975	1,226	+7.29%
1982	2,196	+8.68%
1990	2,430	+1.27%
1999	3,040	+2.52%
2007	3,501	+1.78%
2012	3,856	+1.95%
2017	4,261	+2.02%
2023	4,418	+0.60%
Source: INSEE

== See also ==
- Communes of the Pyrénées-Atlantiques department
