= Viven =

- Commune
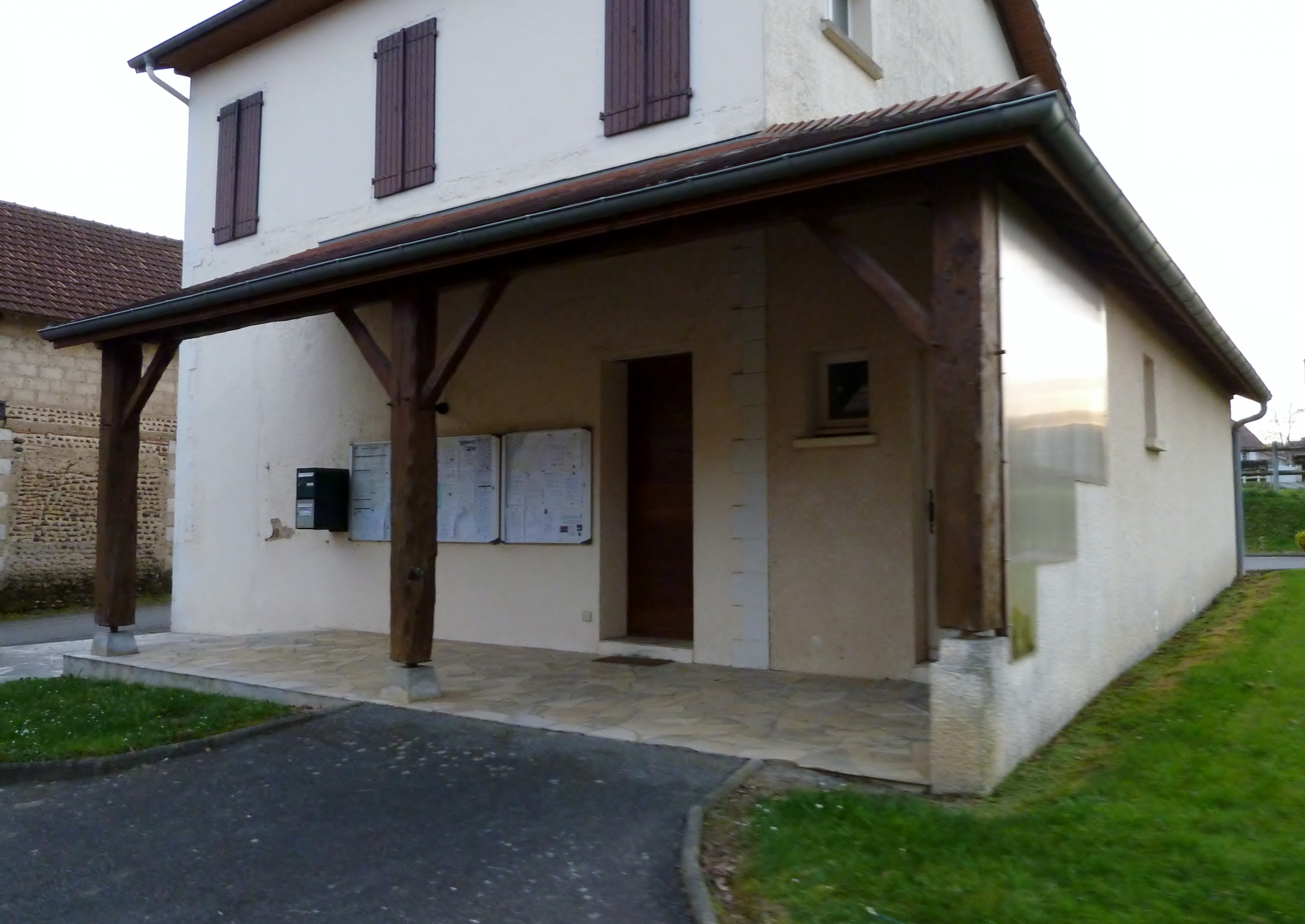
- Town Hall
- Location of Viven
- Location within France Location within Nouvelle-Aquitaine
- Coordinates: 43°27′54″N 0°22′10″W
- Country: France
- Region: Nouvelle-Aquitaine
- Department: Pyrénées-Atlantiques
- Arrondissement: Pau
- Canton: Terres des Luys et Coteaux du Vic-Bilh
- Intercommunality: Luys en Béarn

Government
  - Mayor (2020–2026): Jean-Michel Lory
- Area^{1}: 3.63 km^{2} (1.40 sq mi)
- Elevation: 163 m (535 ft)
- Highest elevation: 267 m (876 ft)
- Lowest elevation: 139 m (456 ft)
- Population (2023): 169
  - Density: 46.6/km^{2} (121/sq mi)
- Time zone: UTC+01:00 (CET)
  - Summer (DST): UTC+02:00 (CEST)
- INSEE/Postal code: 64560 /64450
- ^{1} French Land Register data, which excludes lakes, ponds, glaciers > 1 km^{2} (0.386 sq mi or 247 acres) and river estuaries.

Viven (French pronunciation: [vivɛ̃]; Occitan: Vivent) is a commune in the Pyrénées-Atlantiques department in south-western France.

== See also ==
- Communes of the Pyrénées-Atlantiques department
