= Sauvelade =

- Commune
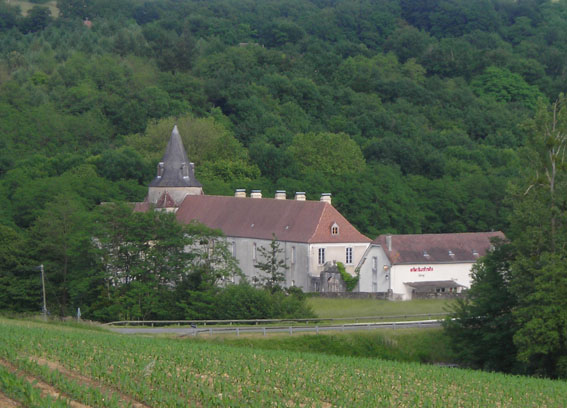
- The abbey of Sauvelade

- Coat of arms
- Location of Sauvelade
- Location within France Location within Nouvelle-Aquitaine
- Coordinates: 43°23′31″N 0°42′22″W
- Country: France
- Region: Nouvelle-Aquitaine
- Department: Pyrénées-Atlantiques
- Arrondissement: Pau
- Canton: Le Cœur de Béarn plus beau village de France

Government
  - Mayor (2020–2026): Didier Plaa
- Area^{1}: 11.86 km^{2} (4.58 sq mi)
- Elevation: 112 m (367 ft)
- Highest elevation: 251 m (823 ft)
- Lowest elevation: 92 m (302 ft)
- Population (2023): 273
  - Density: 23.0/km^{2} (59.6/sq mi)
- Time zone: UTC+01:00 (CET)
  - Summer (DST): UTC+02:00 (CEST)
- INSEE/Postal code: 64512 /64150
- ^{1} French Land Register data, which excludes lakes, ponds, glaciers > 1 km^{2} (0.386 sq mi or 247 acres) and river estuaries.

Sauvelade (French pronunciation: [sovlad]; Occitan: Seuvalada) is a commune in the Pyrénées-Atlantiques department in south-western France.

== See also ==
- Communes of the Pyrénées-Atlantiques department
