= Lannecaube =

- Commune
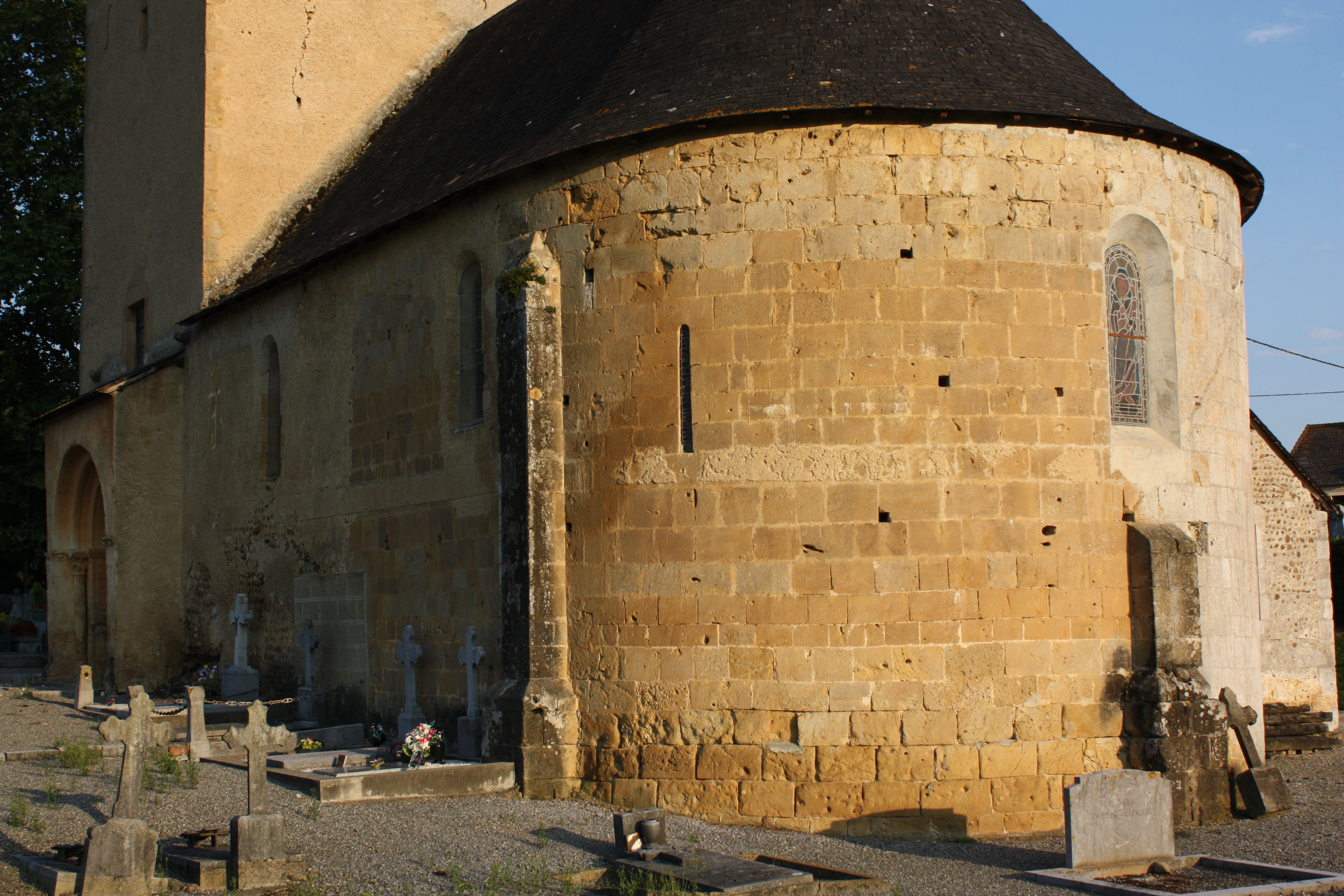
- The church of Lannecaube
- Location of Lannecaube
- Location within France Location within Nouvelle-Aquitaine
- Coordinates: 43°29′06″N 0°12′41″W
- Country: France
- Region: Nouvelle-Aquitaine
- Department: Pyrénées-Atlantiques
- Arrondissement: Pau
- Canton: Terres des Luys et Coteaux du Vic-Bilh
- Intercommunality: Nord-Est Béarn

Government
  - Mayor (2020–2026): Patrick Barbe
- Area^{1}: 8.67 km^{2} (3.35 sq mi)
- Elevation: 204 m (669 ft)
- Highest elevation: 292 m (958 ft)
- Lowest elevation: 154 m (505 ft)
- Population (2023): 145
  - Density: 16.7/km^{2} (43.3/sq mi)
- Time zone: UTC+01:00 (CET)
  - Summer (DST): UTC+02:00 (CEST)
- INSEE/Postal code: 64311 /64350
- ^{1} French Land Register data, which excludes lakes, ponds, glaciers > 1 km^{2} (0.386 sq mi or 247 acres) and river estuaries.

Lannecaube (French pronunciation: [lankob]; Occitan: Lanecauva) is a commune in the Pyrénées-Atlantiques department in south-western France.

== See also ==
- Communes of the Pyrénées-Atlantiques department
