= Corbère-Abères =

- Commune
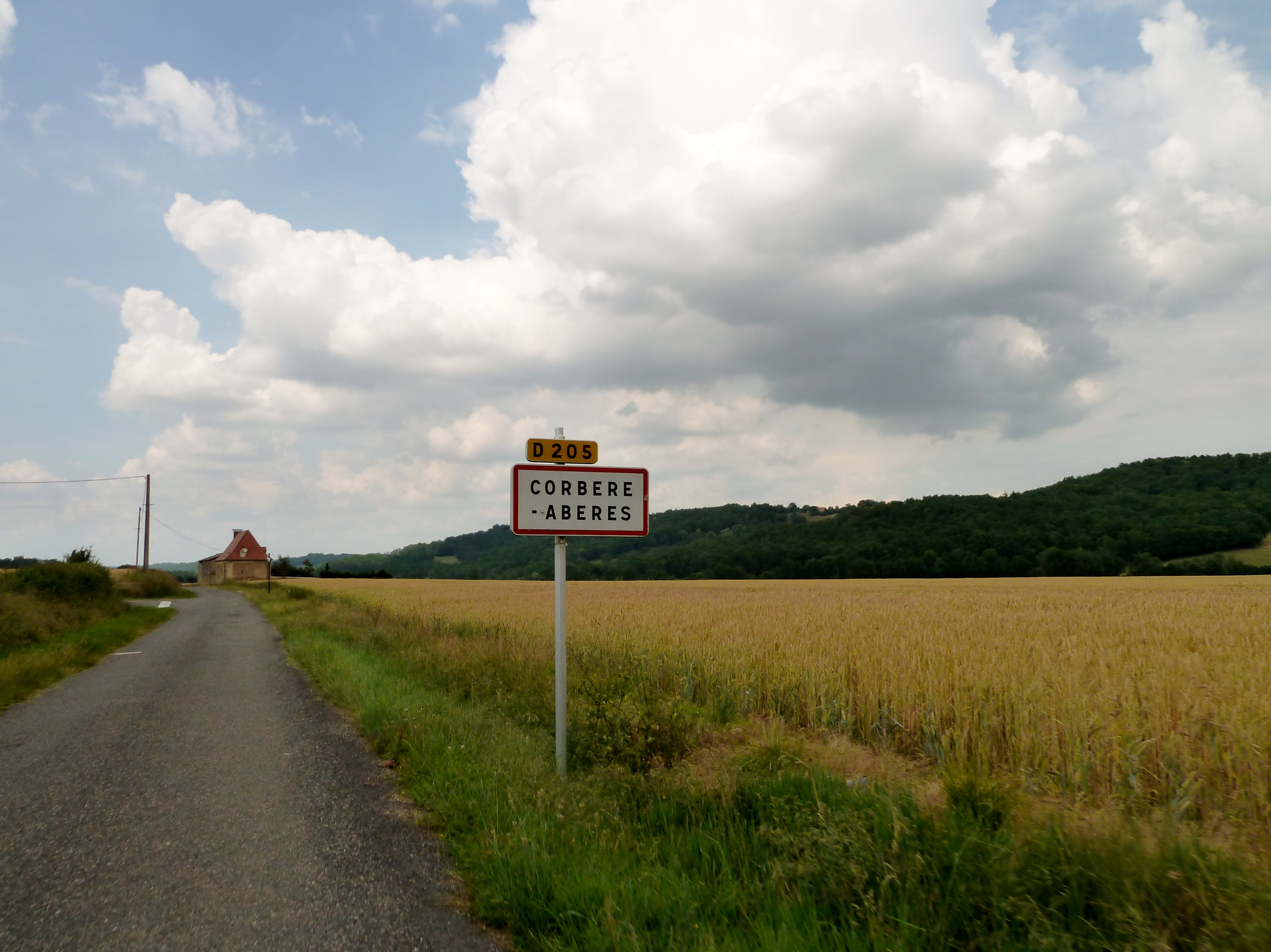
- The road into Corbère-Abères
- Location of Corbère-Abères
- Location within France Location within Nouvelle-Aquitaine
- Coordinates: 43°28′25″N 0°05′14″W
- Country: France
- Region: Nouvelle-Aquitaine
- Department: Pyrénées-Atlantiques
- Arrondissement: Pau
- Canton: Terres des Luys et Coteaux du Vic-Bilh
- Intercommunality: Nord-Est Béarn

Government
  - Mayor (2025–2026): Jérôme Sourbe
- Area^{1}: 7.08 km^{2} (2.73 sq mi)
- Elevation: 197 m (646 ft)
- Highest elevation: 306 m (1,004 ft)
- Lowest elevation: 171 m (561 ft)
- Population (2023): 96
  - Density: 14/km^{2} (35/sq mi)
- Time zone: UTC+01:00 (CET)
  - Summer (DST): UTC+02:00 (CEST)
- INSEE/Postal code: 64193 /64350
- ^{1} French Land Register data, which excludes lakes, ponds, glaciers > 1 km^{2} (0.386 sq mi or 247 acres) and river estuaries.

Corbère-Abères (French pronunciation: [kɔʁbɛʁ abɛʁ]; Occitan: Corbèras e Avera) is a commune in the Pyrénées-Atlantiques department in south-western France.

== See also ==
- Communes of the Pyrénées-Atlantiques department
