= Miossens-Lanusse =

- Commune
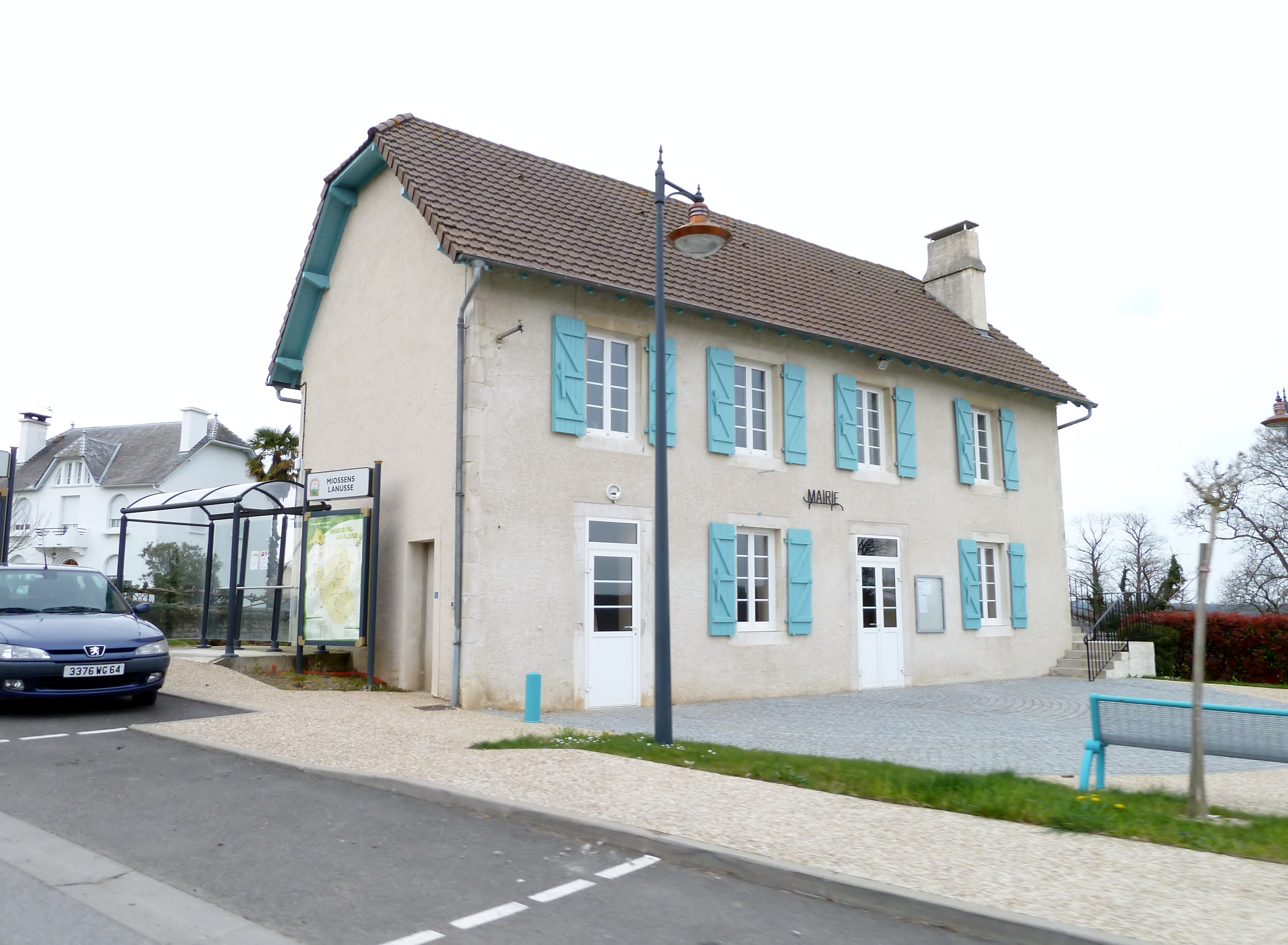
- Town Hall
- Location of Miossens-Lanusse
- Location within France Location within Nouvelle-Aquitaine
- Coordinates: 43°28′09″N 0°17′55″W
- Country: France
- Region: Nouvelle-Aquitaine
- Department: Pyrénées-Atlantiques
- Arrondissement: Pau
- Canton: Terres des Luys et Coteaux du Vic-Bilh
- Intercommunality: Luys en Béarn

Government
  - Mayor (2020–2026): Arnaud Moulié
- Area^{1}: 9.16 km^{2} (3.54 sq mi)
- Elevation: 195 m (640 ft)
- Highest elevation: 247 m (810 ft)
- Lowest elevation: 159 m (522 ft)
- Population (2023): 288
  - Density: 31.4/km^{2} (81.4/sq mi)
- Time zone: UTC+01:00 (CET)
  - Summer (DST): UTC+02:00 (CEST)
- INSEE/Postal code: 64385 /64450
- ^{1} French Land Register data, which excludes lakes, ponds, glaciers > 1 km^{2} (0.386 sq mi or 247 acres) and river estuaries.

Miossens-Lanusse (Gascon: Miaucenç e Lanuça) is a commune in the Pyrénées-Atlantiques department and Nouvelle-Aquitaine region of south-western France.

== See also ==
- Communes of the Pyrénées-Atlantiques department
