= Hagetaubin =

- Commune
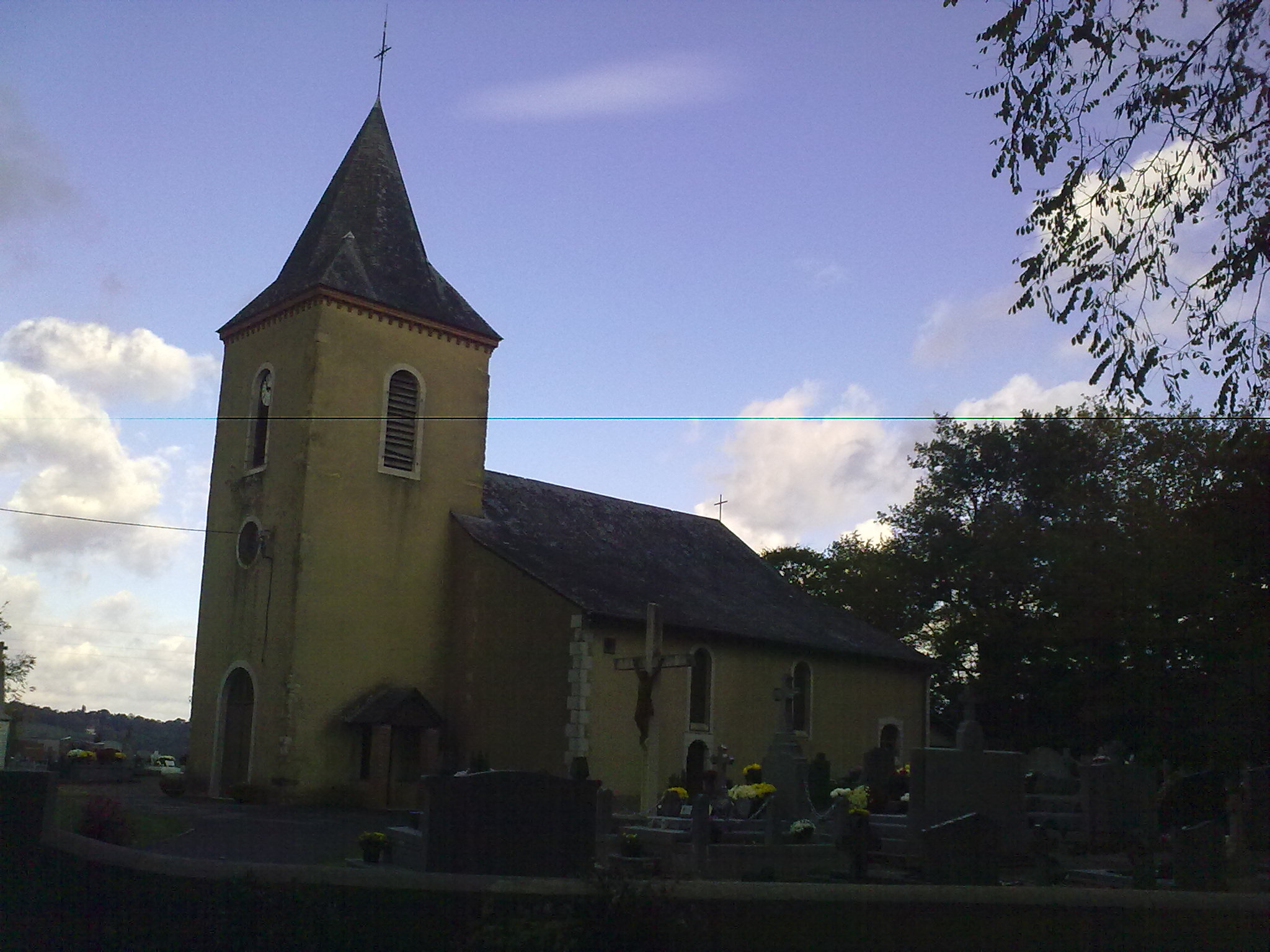
- The church of Hagetaubin
- Location of Hagetaubin
- Location within France Location within Nouvelle-Aquitaine
- Coordinates: 43°31′08″N 0°37′26″W
- Country: France
- Region: Nouvelle-Aquitaine
- Department: Pyrénées-Atlantiques
- Arrondissement: Pau
- Canton: Artix et Pays de Soubestre
- Intercommunality: Lacq-Orthez

Government
  - Mayor (2020–2026): Frédéric Gouaillardou
- Area^{1}: 18.87 km^{2} (7.29 sq mi)
- Elevation: 91 m (299 ft)
- Highest elevation: 128 m (420 ft)
- Lowest elevation: 64 m (210 ft)
- Population (2023): 568
  - Density: 30.1/km^{2} (78.0/sq mi)
- Time zone: UTC+01:00 (CET)
  - Summer (DST): UTC+02:00 (CEST)
- INSEE/Postal code: 64254 /64370
- ^{1} French Land Register data, which excludes lakes, ponds, glaciers > 1 km^{2} (0.386 sq mi or 247 acres) and river estuaries.

Hagetaubin (French pronunciation: [aʒetobɛ̃]; also Hagétaubin) is a commune in the Pyrénées-Atlantiques department in south-western France.

== See also ==
- Communes of the Pyrénées-Atlantiques department
