= Gayon, Pyrénées-Atlantiques =

Gayon
- Commune
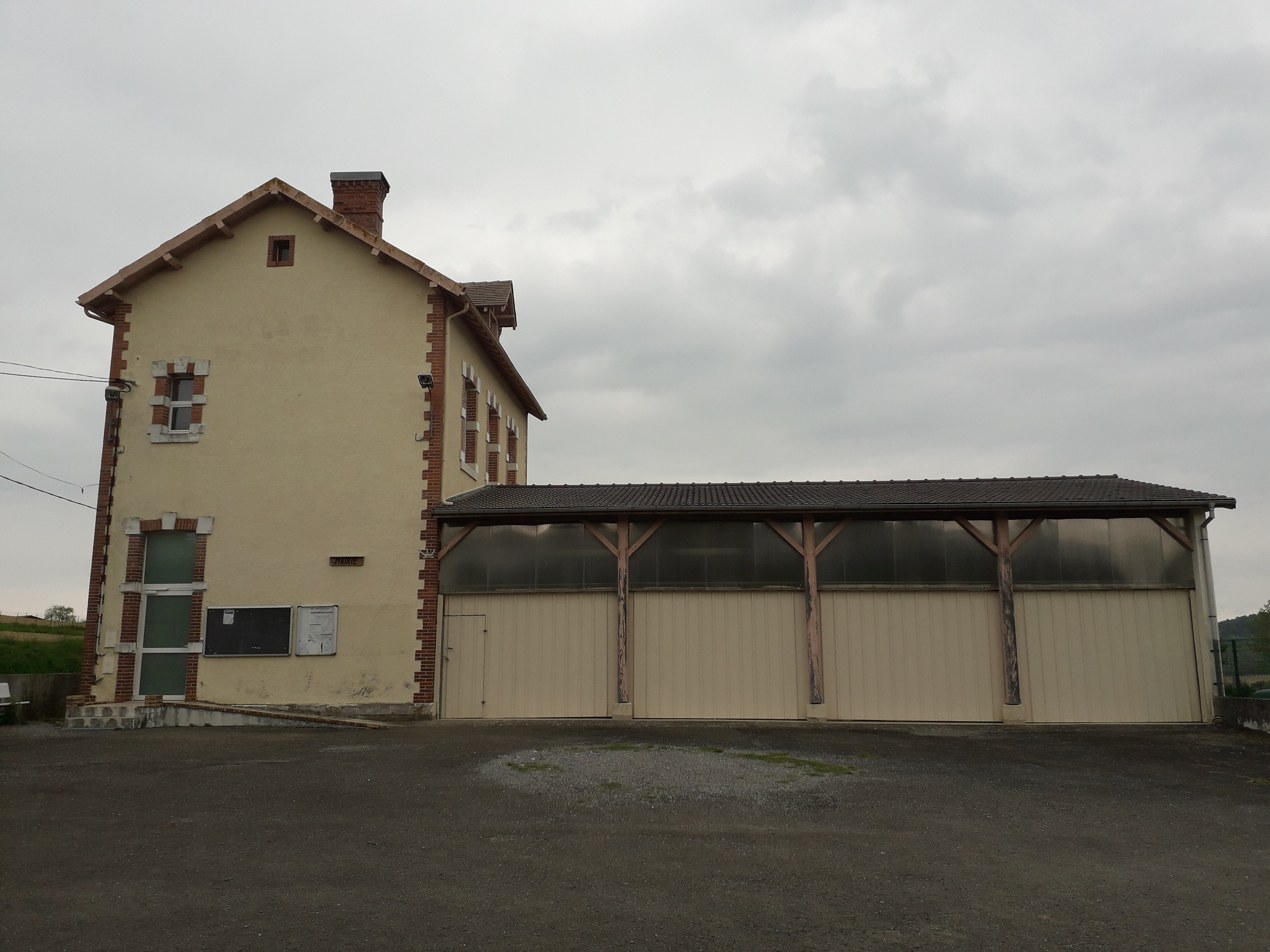
- Town Hall and Village Hall of Gayon.
- Location of Gayon
- Location within France Location within Nouvelle-Aquitaine
- Coordinates: 43°29′00″N 0°10′07″W
- Country: France
- Region: Nouvelle-Aquitaine
- Department: Pyrénées-Atlantiques
- Arrondissement: Pau
- Canton: Terres des Luys et Coteaux du Vic-Bilh
- Intercommunality: Nord-Est Béarn

Government
  - Mayor (2020–2026): Pierre Peilhet
- Area^{1}: 3.95 km^{2} (1.53 sq mi)
- Elevation: 190 m (620 ft)
- Highest elevation: 298 m (978 ft)
- Lowest elevation: 148 m (486 ft)
- Population (2023): 57
  - Density: 14/km^{2} (37/sq mi)
- Time zone: UTC+01:00 (CET)
  - Summer (DST): UTC+02:00 (CEST)
- INSEE/Postal code: 64236 /64350
- ^{1} French Land Register data, which excludes lakes, ponds, glaciers > 1 km^{2} (0.386 sq mi or 247 acres) and river estuaries.

Gayon (French pronunciation: [ɡajɔ̃]; Occitan: Gaion) is a commune in the Pyrénées-Atlantiques department in south-western France.

== Infrastructures ==
Gayon has a village hall next to the city hall.

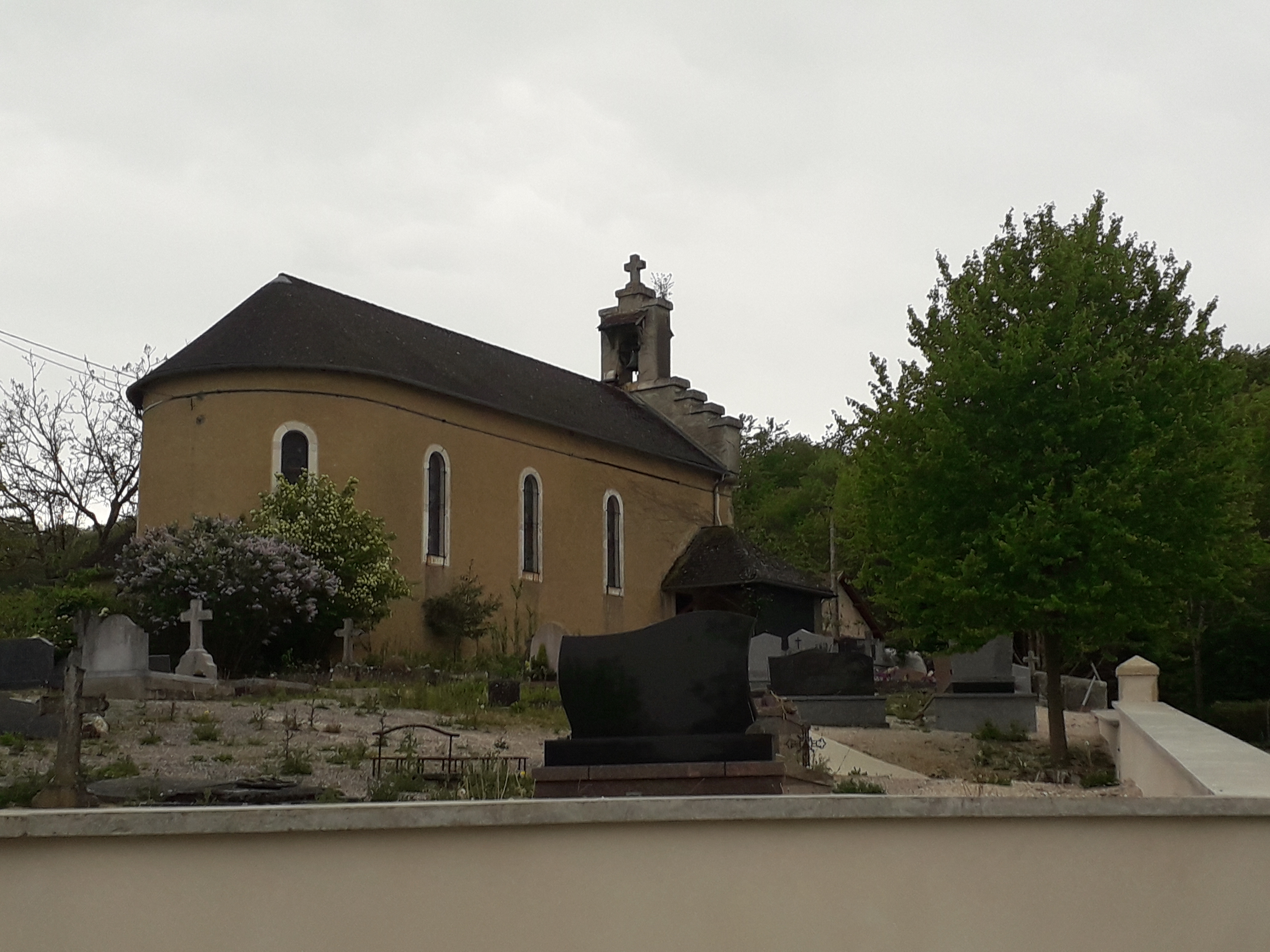
There is also a church with a cemetery.

== See also ==
- Communes of the Pyrénées-Atlantiques department
