= Castillon (Canton of Arthez-de-Béarn) =

- Commune
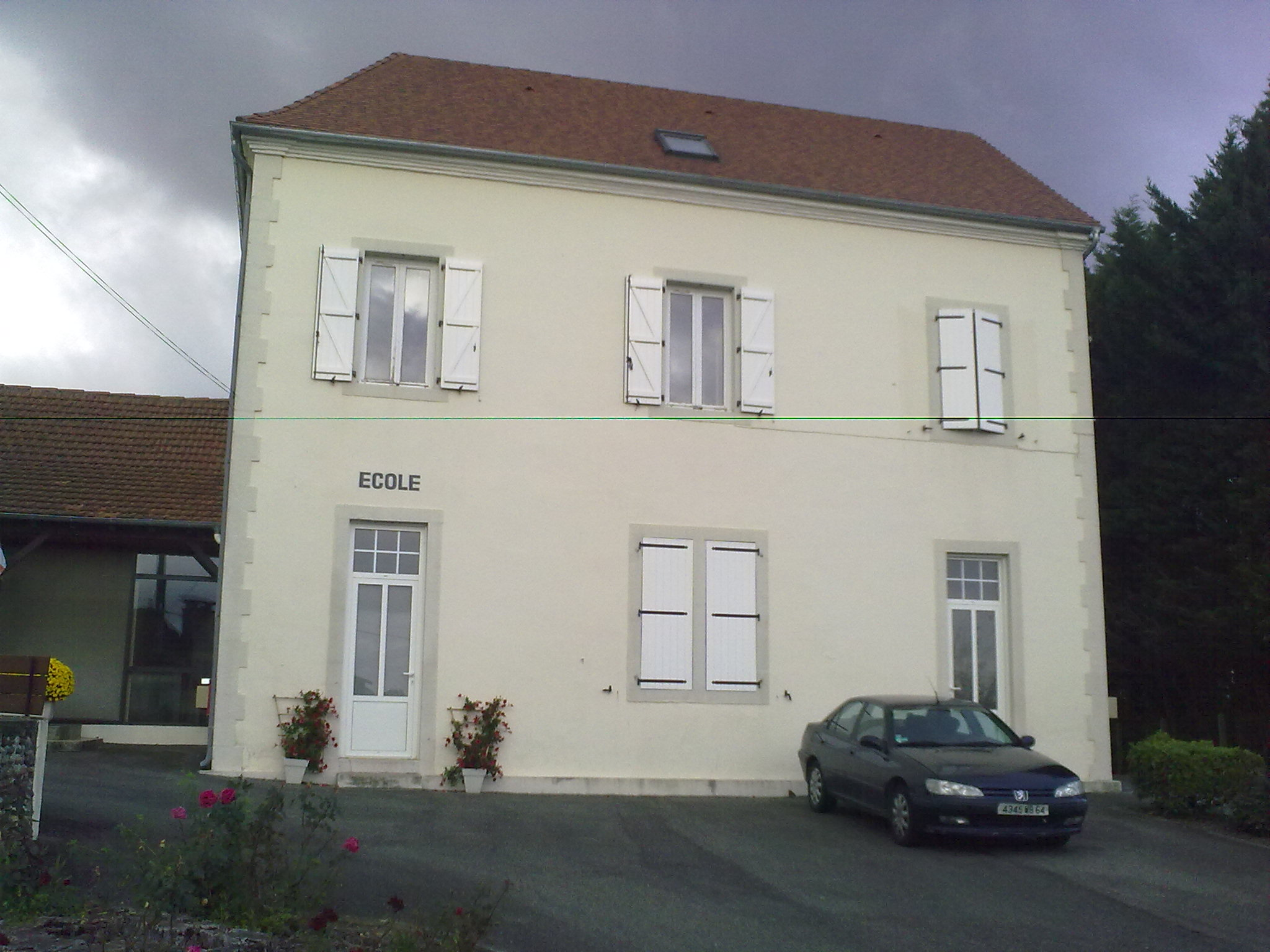
- The school of Castillon

- Coat of arms
- Location of Castillon (Canton of Arthez-de-Béarn)
- Location within France Location within Nouvelle-Aquitaine
- Coordinates: 43°27′59″N 0°34′30″W
- Country: France
- Region: Nouvelle-Aquitaine
- Department: Pyrénées-Atlantiques
- Arrondissement: Pau
- Canton: Artix et Pays de Soubestre
- Intercommunality: Lacq-Orthez

Government
  - Mayor (2020–2026): Gilles Mardelle
- Area^{1}: 6.71 km^{2} (2.59 sq mi)
- Elevation: 132 m (433 ft)
- Highest elevation: 231 m (758 ft)
- Lowest elevation: 122 m (400 ft)
- Population (2023): 332
  - Density: 49.5/km^{2} (128/sq mi)
- Time zone: UTC+01:00 (CET)
  - Summer (DST): UTC+02:00 (CEST)
- INSEE/Postal code: 64181 /64370
- ^{1} French Land Register data, which excludes lakes, ponds, glaciers > 1 km^{2} (0.386 sq mi or 247 acres) and river estuaries.

Castillon (French pronunciation: [kastijɔ̃], officially Castillon (Canton of Arthez-de-Béarn), sometimes referred to as Castillon-d'Arthez; Occitan: Castilhon) is a commune in the Pyrénées-Atlantiques department in south-western France.

== See also ==
- Communes of the Pyrénées-Atlantiques department
