= Michel Grosclaude =

French linguist and author (1926-2002)

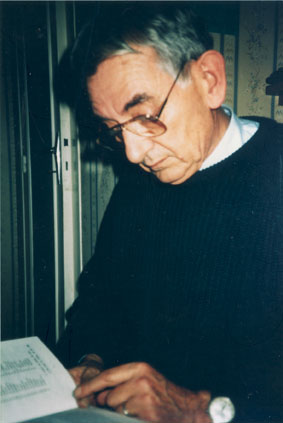
- Michel Grosclaude
- Born: Michel Grosclaude; 8 July 1926; Nancy, France
- Died: 21 May 2002 (aged 75); Sauvelade, France
- Resting place: Sauvelade, France
- Occupation: Professor
- Spouse: Claudette Perrotin

Michel Grosclaude (French pronunciation: [miʃɛl ɡʁɔsklod]; Occitan: Miquèu; 8 July 1926 – 21 May 2002) was a French linguist, and an author of works on grammar, lexicography and Occitan onomastics.

== Biography ==
Born on 8 July 1926 in Nancy. He was the son of Pierre Grosclaude, an academic. He studied in Lyon and in Marseille and spent time in Le Chambon-sur-Lignon during the war, which had some significance for his humanistic ideas. He finished his training in Latin, Greek, and philosophy at the Sorbonne.

He was appointed as a professor at Chinon where he married Claudette Perrotin, a teacher. They then sought the possibility of compatible posts and came across them in Béarn: she at Sauvelade, he in the Orthez high school where he arrived in 1958.

Volunteering to take the post of secretary of the town council in Sauvelade, he was confronted for the first time with the Occitan language in its béarnaise and Gascon variants. He understood the importance of this language that he had seen at the Mistral de Marseille high school. He decided to train with the help of Roger Lapassade, a high school colleague, who in 1960 founded the association Per Noste in Orthez as a Gascon section of the Occitan Studies Institute (ASI). Noted for his knowledge of Latin and Greek, he integrated with the association in 1965 and quickly became a specialist, lexicographer and historian of the language. He would be one of the leaders of the defence of Occitan culture until his death.

He became professor of Occitan and worked on the publishing of first level textbooks with Robert Darrigrand. At the same time he contributed to the magazine Per Noste País Gascons and a History of Béarn designed for teachers and students.

He directed his first elementary French-Occitan dictionary (for Bearnais) for the La Civada association in Pau. Then he tackled writing a more complete version of this dictionary, with Gilbert Narioo, and it was completed by Patric Guilhemjoan after his death in 2002.

Meanwhile, he taught himself the onomastics of Occitan and made some very interesting studies of Gascon toponymy and patronymy. For twelve years he hosted his 15-minute daily show, lo Cercanoms (the researcher of names), on Ràdio País with Crestian Lamaison who was one of his students. His show was open to all topics pertaining to the heritage of proper names.

Along with his job as a professor of philosophy it was little known that he was interested in many subjects, some of which he was passionate about, such as geology and book binding. He wrote some plays for the Gascon theatre. He also worked with the Centre for the Study of Béarnais Protestantism and published several papers in their journal.

He died on 21 May 2002, and was buried at Sauvelade.

== Bibliography ==
=== Theatre ===
- La Republica Peiralada (Per Noste).
- Lo procès de l'aulhèr (Per Noste).
- La termièra sauvatja (Per Noste).

=== Studies, essays and manuals ===
- Lo Gascon lèu e plan (OmniVox manual)
- Le Bearn, testimonials on 1000 years of history (Per Noste)
- La Gascogne, testimonials on 2000 years of history (Per Noste, repr. 2006)
- Toponymical Dictionary of the Communes of Béarn (Escola Gaston Phoebus, 1991).
- L'Evangèli segon sant Matèu (translation of the Gospel of Matthew, Per Noste 1995).
- Etymological dictionary of Gascon family names (Ràdio País, 1992, repr. 2004 Website).
- Directory of Occitan conjugations of Gascony (Per Noste - The Civada, UTIs, 1998).
- Toponymical Dictionary of the Communes of Hautes-Pyrénées (Ed. General Council of Hautes-Pyrénées, 2000).
- Small French-Occitan dictionary (Gascon), lo Civadet (Per Noste - The Civada, UTIs, 1984).
- 70 keys to the learning of Occitan in Gascony (Per Noste - The Civada, UTIs, 2000).

=== Introduction of Classic Gascon Authors ===
- JH Fondeville, The pastorala deu paisan with Gilbert Narioo (Per Noste - The Civada, 2001).
- Navera pastorala bearnesa with Gilbert Narioo (Per Noste - The Civada, 2001).
- The sermon of the priest of Bideren (Per Noste - The Civada, 2002).
- Father Girardeau, Las macarienas (Per Noste - The Civada, 2002).
- Maria Blanga, era darrèra deras aurostèras dera vath Aspa (Per Noste - The Civada, 2004)

=== Joint Works ===
- History of Béarn with Dominique Bidot-Germa and Jean-Paul Duchon (Per Noste 1990).
- French-Occitan (Gascon) Dictionary, 45,000 entries, with Gilbert Narioo and Patric Guilhemjoan (Per Noste, 2004 [t. 1 AK], 2007 [a. 2 LZ]).
