= Saint-Jammes =

- Commune
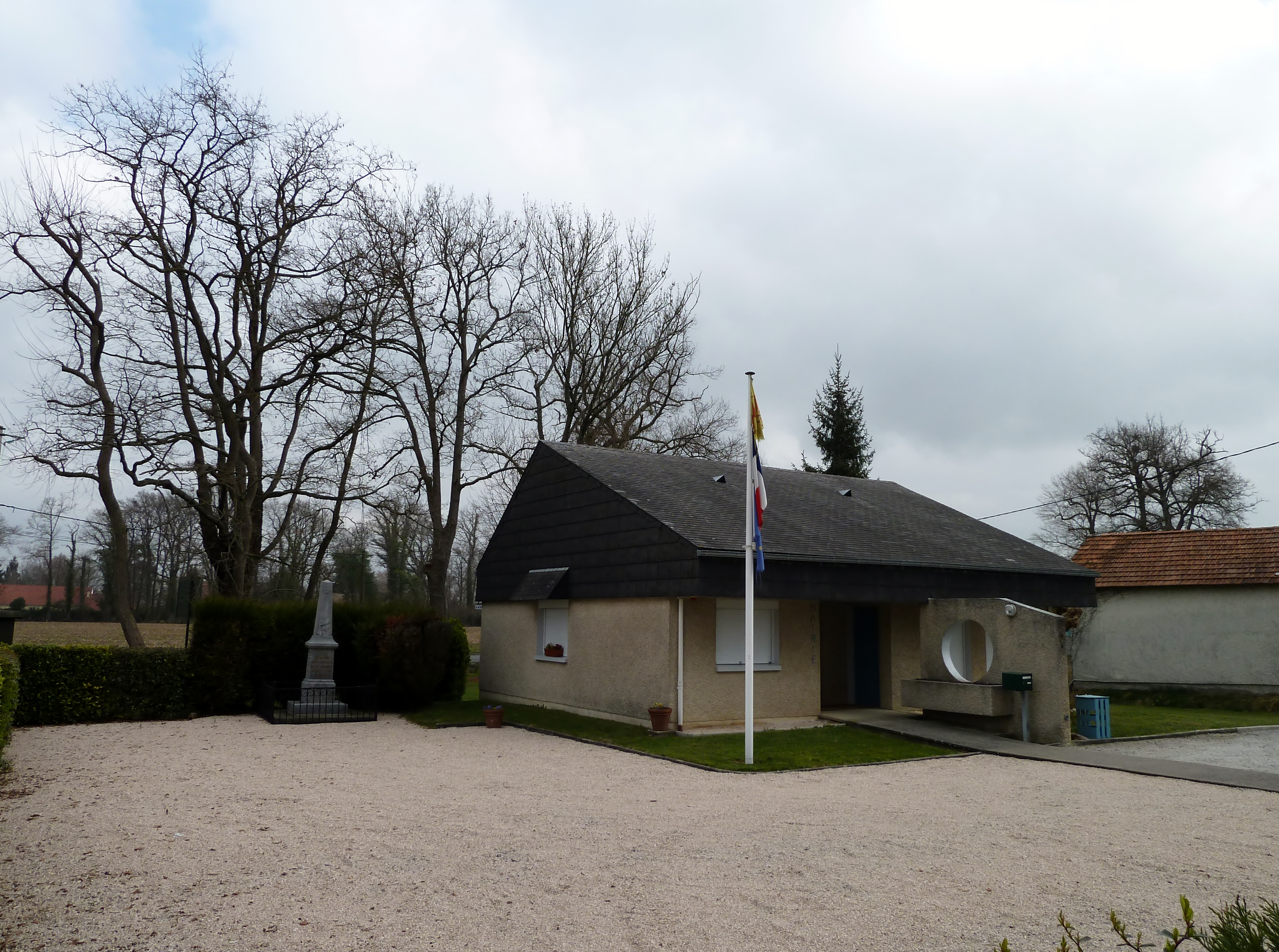
- Town Hall of Saint-Jammes
- Location of Saint-Jammes
- Location within France Location within Nouvelle-Aquitaine
- Coordinates: 43°21′29″N 0°14′53″W
- Country: France
- Region: Nouvelle-Aquitaine
- Department: Pyrénées-Atlantiques
- Arrondissement: Pau
- Canton: Pays de Morlaàs et du Montanérès
- Intercommunality: Nord Est Béarn

Government
  - Mayor (2020–2026): Jean-Louis Ducousso
- Area^{1}: 4.05 km^{2} (1.56 sq mi)
- Elevation: 310 m (1,020 ft)
- Highest elevation: 306 m (1,004 ft)
- Lowest elevation: 237 m (778 ft)
- Population (2023): 642
  - Density: 159/km^{2} (411/sq mi)
- Time zone: UTC+01:00 (CET)
  - Summer (DST): UTC+02:00 (CEST)
- INSEE/Postal code: 64482 /64160
- ^{1} French Land Register data, which excludes lakes, ponds, glaciers > 1 km^{2} (0.386 sq mi or 247 acres) and river estuaries.

Saint-Jammes (French pronunciation: [sɛ̃ ʒam]; Occitan: Sent Jacme) is a commune in the Pyrénées-Atlantiques department in south-western France. Its name in Béarnais is Sén-Yàmmẹ or Sén-Yàmbẹ.

== Geography ==
The commune is bordered by Higuères-Souye, Gabaston, Maucor, Bernadets and Morlaàs (to the south).

=== Localities and hamlets ===
- Blanche-Neige (west)
- La Hagède (west)
- Serre de Lacrouts (east)
- Serre Debat

== Economy ==
An industrial zone is present near the public school. There is a tobacco bar.

== Residents ==
In 2007 the unemployment rate was 6.9% against 10.1% in 1999, with pre-retirees and retirees representing 14.9% of the population (11.1% in 1999) and a rate of activity of 59.1% (58.2 in 1999).

== Religious heritage ==
Saint-Jammes has the distinction of not having a church.

== Sports and sports facilities ==
The 17th stage of the Tour de France 2007 passed through the commune on 26 July. Over the course of 188 kilometers it connected Pau to Castelsarrasin. It has a general sports centre (Aime Capdeboscq). There is also a bowling ground, a floodlit football field as well as tennis court.

== Education ==
The commune has a public elementary school.

== Points of interest ==
- Jardin botanique des Pyrénées occidentales
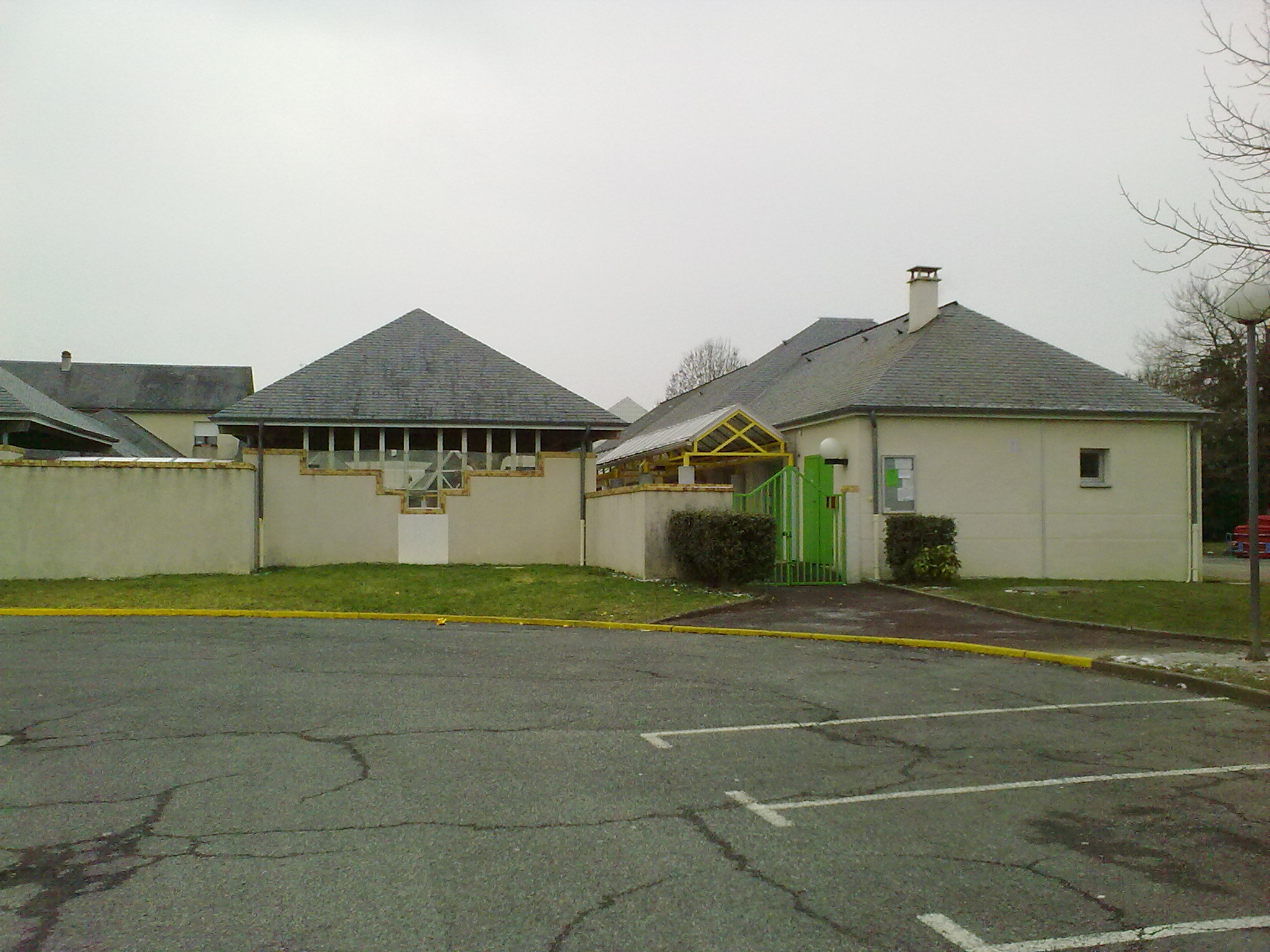
Saint-Jammes public school

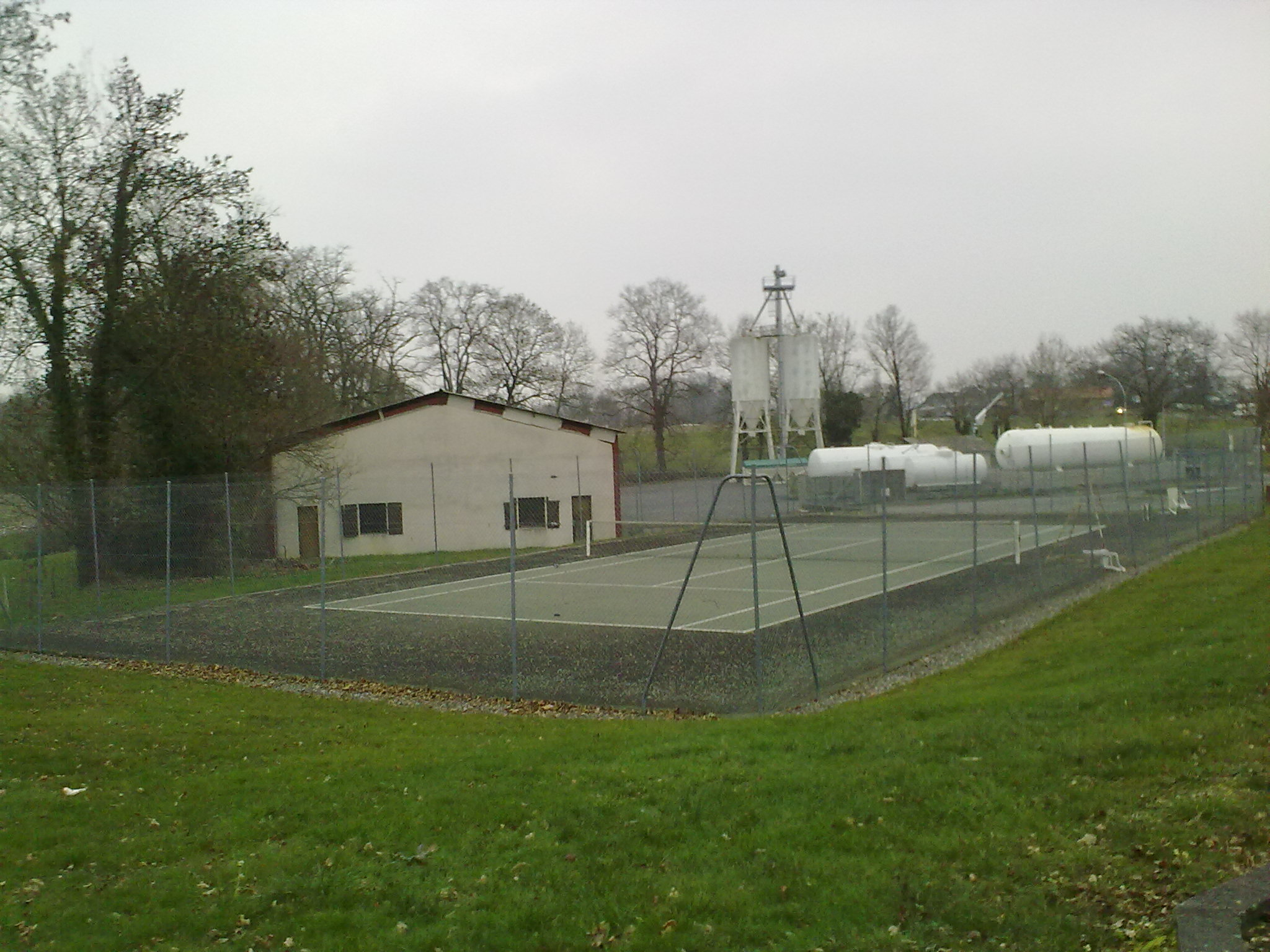
Saint-Jammes tennis field

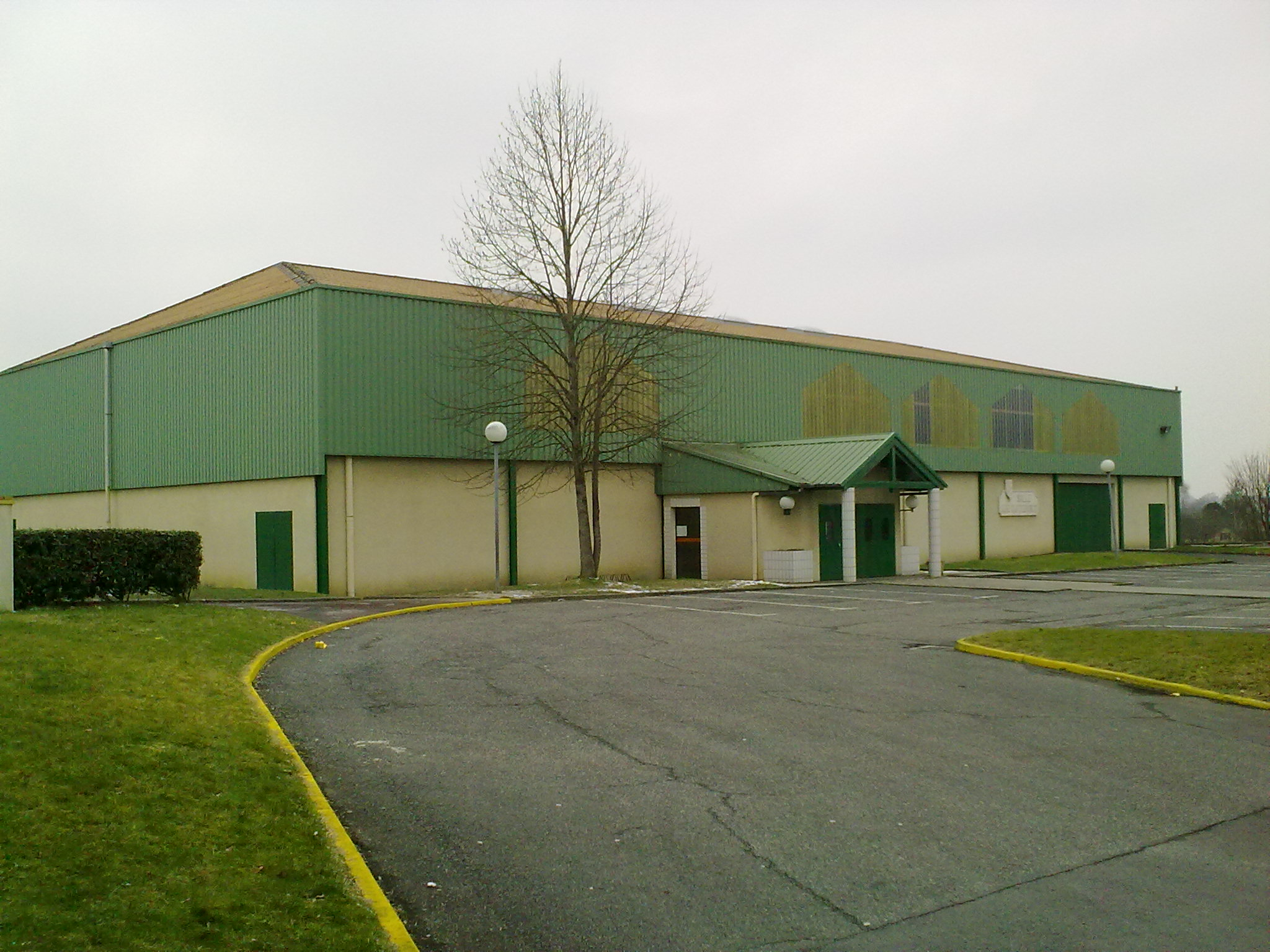
Saint-Jammes multipurpose room

== See also ==
- Communes of the Pyrénées-Atlantiques department
