= Bédeille, Pyrénées-Atlantiques =

Bédeille
- Commune
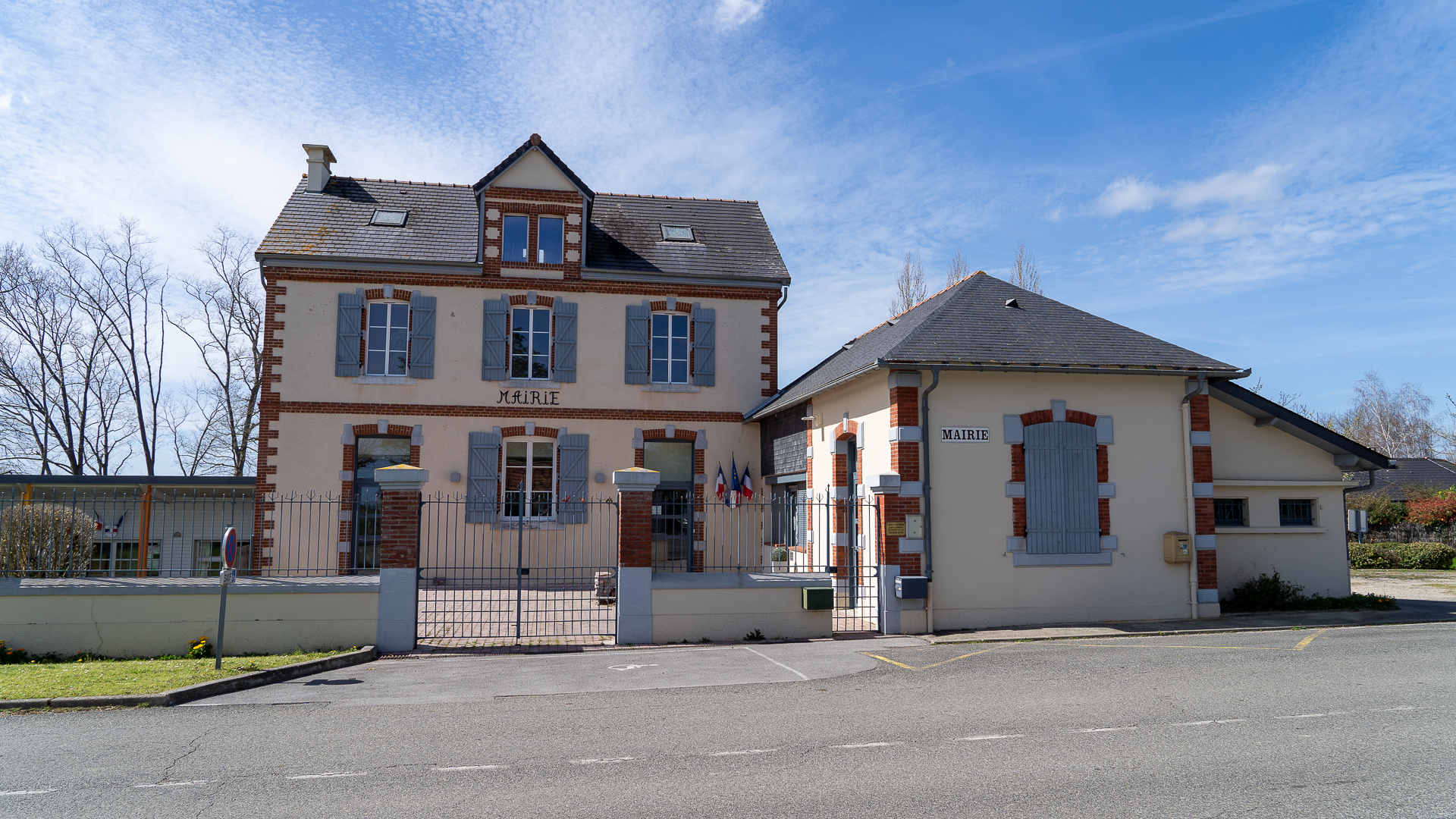
- Location of Bédeille
- Location within France Location within Nouvelle-Aquitaine
- Coordinates: 43°20′55″N 0°05′59″W
- Country: France
- Region: Nouvelle-Aquitaine
- Department: Pyrénées-Atlantiques
- Arrondissement: Pau
- Canton: Pays de Morlaàs et du Montanérès

Government
  - Mayor (2020–2026): Francis Sebat
- Area^{1}: 3.85 km^{2} (1.49 sq mi)
- Elevation: 355 m (1,165 ft)
- Highest elevation: 374 m (1,227 ft)
- Lowest elevation: 276 m (906 ft)
- Population (2023): 202
  - Density: 52.5/km^{2} (136/sq mi)
- Time zone: UTC+01:00 (CET)
  - Summer (DST): UTC+02:00 (CEST)
- INSEE/Postal code: 64103 /64460
- ^{1} French Land Register data, which excludes lakes, ponds, glaciers > 1 km^{2} (0.386 sq mi or 247 acres) and river estuaries.

Bédeille (French pronunciation: [bedɛj]; Occitan: Vedelha) is a commune of the Pyrénées-Atlantiques department in southwestern France.

== See also ==
- Communes of the Pyrénées-Atlantiques department
