= Bentayou-Sérée =

- Commune
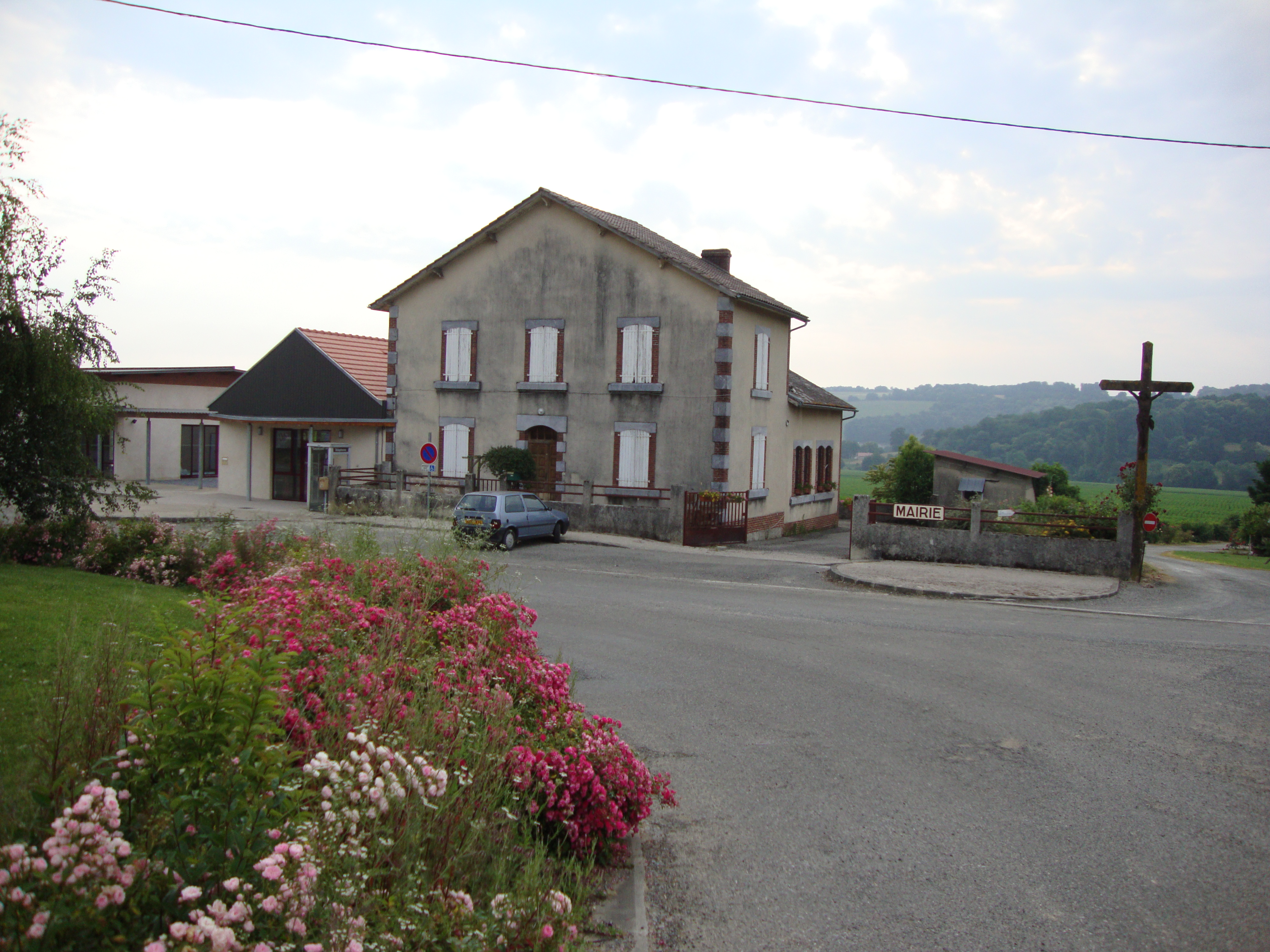
- Town hall
- Location of Bentayou-Sérée
- Location within France Location within Nouvelle-Aquitaine
- Coordinates: 43°23′39″N 0°03′50″W
- Country: France
- Region: Nouvelle-Aquitaine
- Department: Pyrénées-Atlantiques
- Arrondissement: Pau
- Canton: Pays de Morlaàs et du Montanérès
- Intercommunality: Adour Madiran

Government
  - Mayor (2020–2026): Jean-Paul Teulé
- Area^{1}: 8.26 km^{2} (3.19 sq mi)
- Elevation: 280 m (920 ft)
- Highest elevation: 345 m (1,132 ft)
- Lowest elevation: 218 m (715 ft)
- Population (2023): 107
  - Density: 13.0/km^{2} (33.6/sq mi)
- Time zone: UTC+01:00 (CET)
  - Summer (DST): UTC+02:00 (CEST)
- INSEE/Postal code: 64111 /64460
- ^{1} French Land Register data, which excludes lakes, ponds, glaciers > 1 km^{2} (0.386 sq mi or 247 acres) and river estuaries.

Bentayou-Sérée (French pronunciation: [bɛ̃taju seʁe]; Occitan: Ventajor e Serèr) is a commune of the Pyrénées-Atlantiques department in southwestern France.

== See also ==
- Communes of the Pyrénées-Atlantiques department
