= Maure, Pyrénées-Atlantiques =

Maure
- Commune
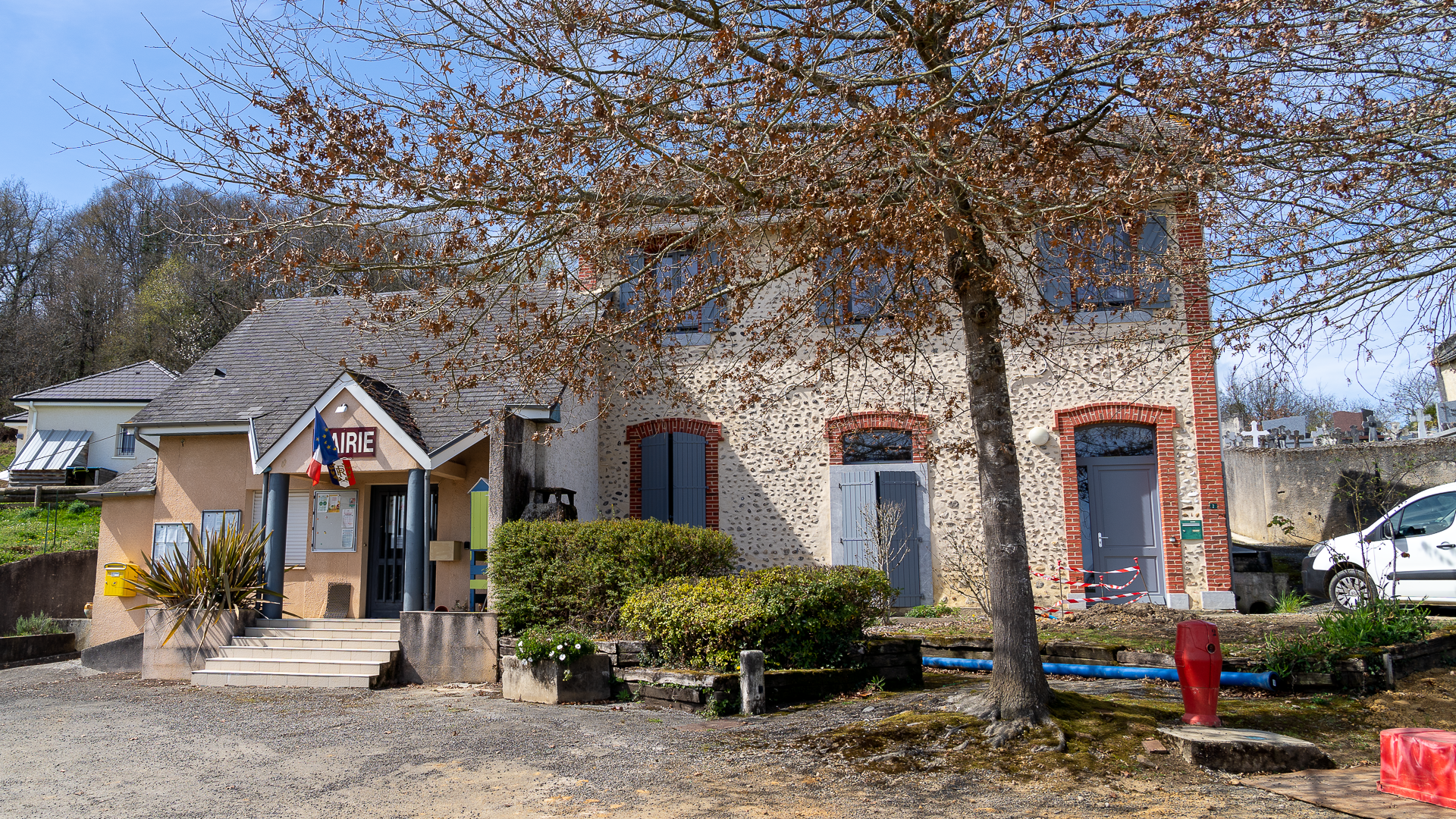
- Maure Town hall
- Location of Maure
- Location within France Location within Nouvelle-Aquitaine
- Coordinates: 43°22′59″N 0°04′16″W
- Country: France
- Region: Nouvelle-Aquitaine
- Department: Pyrénées-Atlantiques
- Arrondissement: Pau
- Canton: Pays de Morlaàs et du Montanérès

Government
  - Mayor (2020–2026): Katy Gaignard
- Area^{1}: 3.59 km^{2} (1.39 sq mi)
- Elevation: 253 m (830 ft)
- Highest elevation: 353 m (1,158 ft)
- Lowest elevation: 244 m (801 ft)
- Population (2023): 90
  - Density: 25/km^{2} (65/sq mi)
- Time zone: UTC+01:00 (CET)
  - Summer (DST): UTC+02:00 (CEST)
- INSEE/Postal code: 64372 /64460
- ^{1} French Land Register data, which excludes lakes, ponds, glaciers > 1 km^{2} (0.386 sq mi or 247 acres) and river estuaries.

Maure (French pronunciation: [mɔʁ]; Occitan: Maura) is a commune in the Pyrénées-Atlantiques department in south-western France.

== See also ==
- Communes of the Pyrénées-Atlantiques department
