= Espéchède =

- Commune
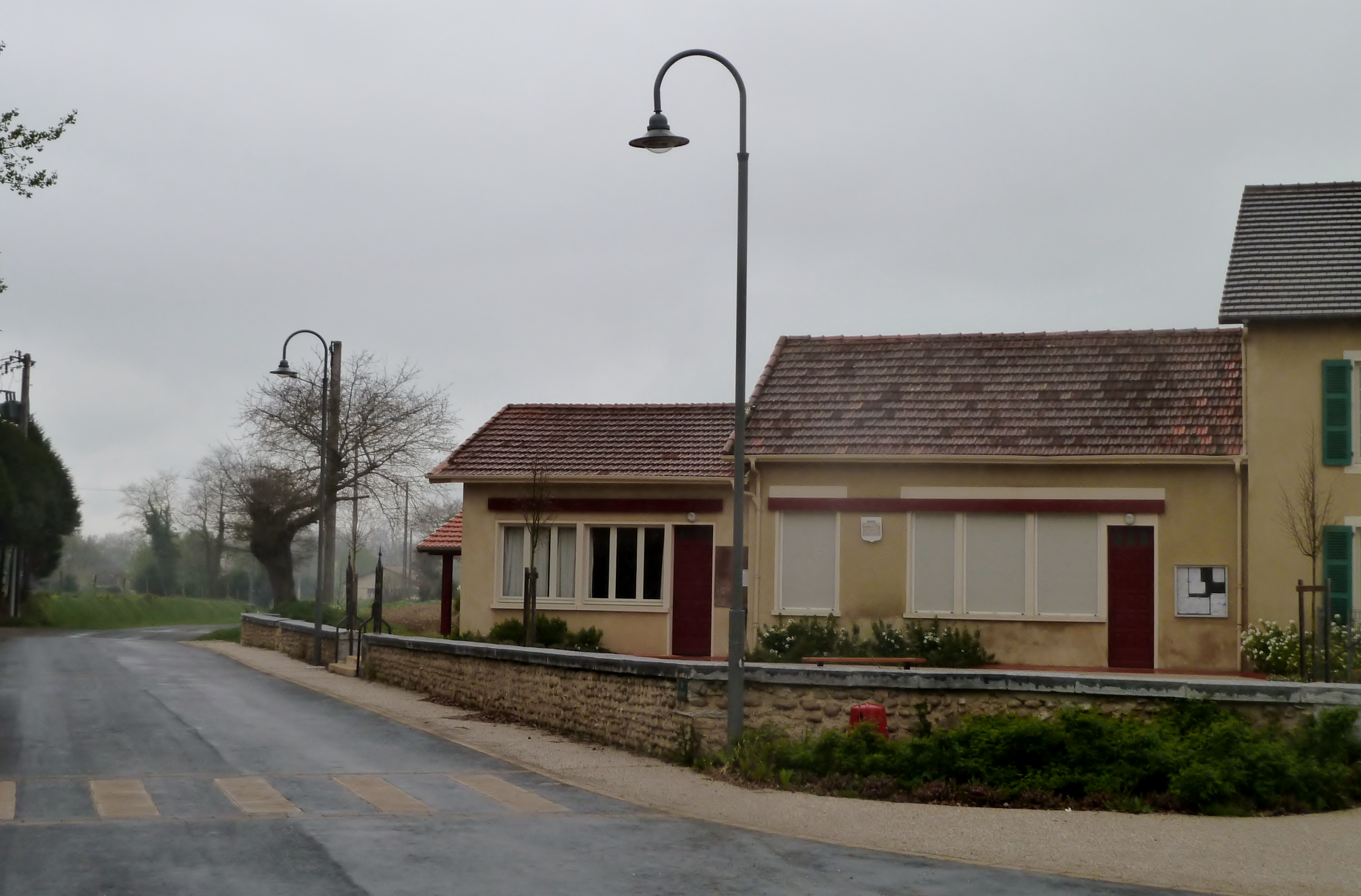
- The town hall of Espéchède
- Location of Espéchède
- Location within France Location within Nouvelle-Aquitaine
- Coordinates: 43°19′03″N 0°10′54″W
- Country: France
- Region: Nouvelle-Aquitaine
- Department: Pyrénées-Atlantiques
- Arrondissement: Pau
- Canton: Pays de Morlaàs et du Montanérès
- Intercommunality: Nord-Est Béarn

Government
  - Mayor (2020–2026): Régine Bergeret
- Area^{1}: 9.32 km^{2} (3.60 sq mi)
- Elevation: 341 m (1,119 ft)
- Highest elevation: 354 m (1,161 ft)
- Lowest elevation: 313 m (1,027 ft)
- Population (2023): 165
  - Density: 17.7/km^{2} (45.9/sq mi)
- Time zone: UTC+01:00 (CET)
  - Summer (DST): UTC+02:00 (CEST)
- INSEE/Postal code: 64212 /64160
- ^{1} French Land Register data, which excludes lakes, ponds, glaciers > 1 km^{2} (0.386 sq mi or 247 acres) and river estuaries.

Espéchède (French pronunciation: [ɛspeʃɛd]; Occitan: Espeisheda) is a commune in the Pyrénées-Atlantiques department in south-western France.

== See also ==
- Communes of the Pyrénées-Atlantiques department
