= Urost =

- Commune
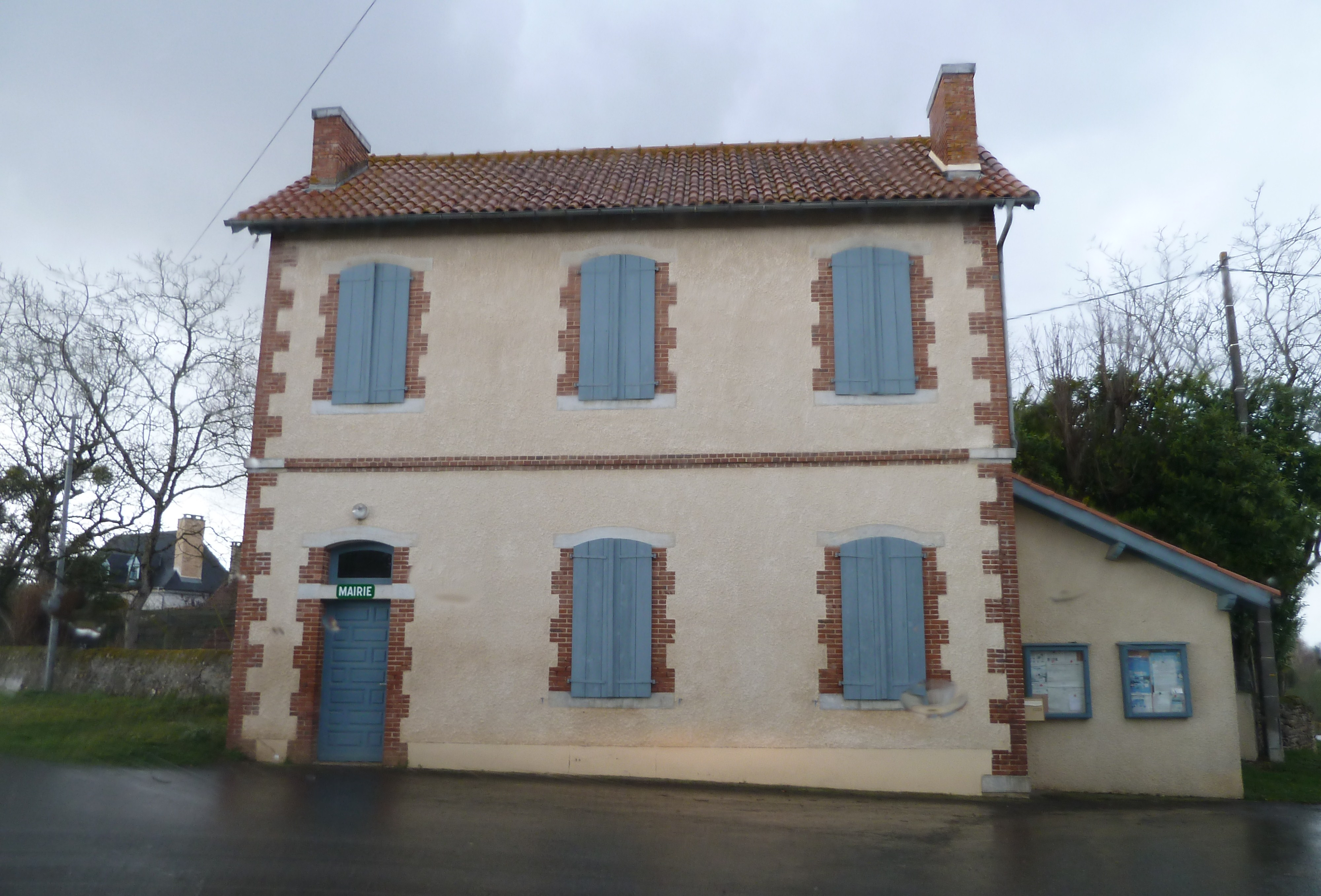
- The town hall of Urost
- Location of Urost
- Location within France Location within Nouvelle-Aquitaine
- Coordinates: 43°20′22″N 0°08′49″W
- Country: France
- Region: Nouvelle-Aquitaine
- Department: Pyrénées-Atlantiques
- Arrondissement: Pau
- Canton: Pays de Morlaàs et du Montanérès
- Intercommunality: Nord-Est Béarn

Government
  - Mayor (2020–2026): Fabien Romand
- Area^{1}: 2.33 km^{2} (0.90 sq mi)
- Elevation: 365 m (1,198 ft)
- Highest elevation: 374 m (1,227 ft)
- Lowest elevation: 303 m (994 ft)
- Population (2023): 77
  - Density: 33/km^{2} (86/sq mi)
- Time zone: UTC+01:00 (CET)
  - Summer (DST): UTC+02:00 (CEST)
- INSEE/Postal code: 64544 /64160
- ^{1} French Land Register data, which excludes lakes, ponds, glaciers > 1 km^{2} (0.386 sq mi or 247 acres) and river estuaries.

Urost (French pronunciation: [yʁɔst]; Occitan: Uròst) is a commune of the Pyrénées-Atlantiques department in southwestern France.

== See also ==
- Communes of the Pyrénées-Atlantiques department
