= Momy =

- Commune
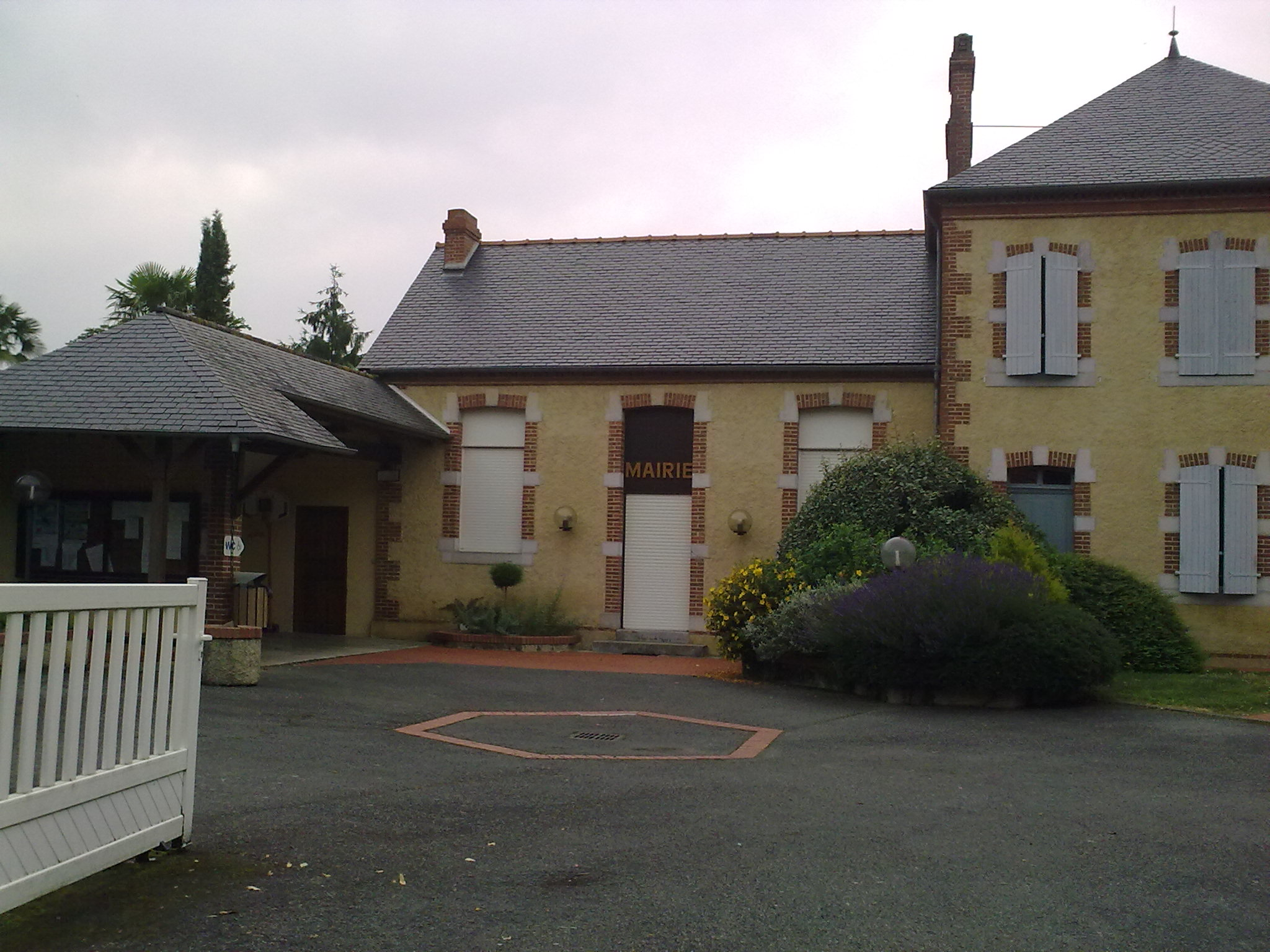
- The town hall of Momy
- Location of Momy
- Location within France Location within Nouvelle-Aquitaine
- Coordinates: 43°23′53″N 0°06′24″W
- Country: France
- Region: Nouvelle-Aquitaine
- Department: Pyrénées-Atlantiques
- Arrondissement: Pau
- Canton: Pays de Morlaàs et du Montanérès
- Intercommunality: Nord-Est Béarn

Government
  - Mayor (2020–2026): Marc Gairin
- Area^{1}: 6.00 km^{2} (2.32 sq mi)
- Elevation: 329 m (1,079 ft)
- Highest elevation: 354 m (1,161 ft)
- Lowest elevation: 224 m (735 ft)
- Population (2023): 114
  - Density: 19.0/km^{2} (49.2/sq mi)
- Time zone: UTC+01:00 (CET)
  - Summer (DST): UTC+02:00 (CEST)
- INSEE/Postal code: 64388 /64350
- ^{1} French Land Register data, which excludes lakes, ponds, glaciers > 1 km^{2} (0.386 sq mi or 247 acres) and river estuaries.

Momy (French pronunciation: [mɔmi]; Occitan: Momin) is a commune in the Pyrénées-Atlantiques department and Nouvelle-Aquitaine region of south-western France.

== See also ==
- Communes of the Pyrénées-Atlantiques department
