= Lamayou =

- Commune
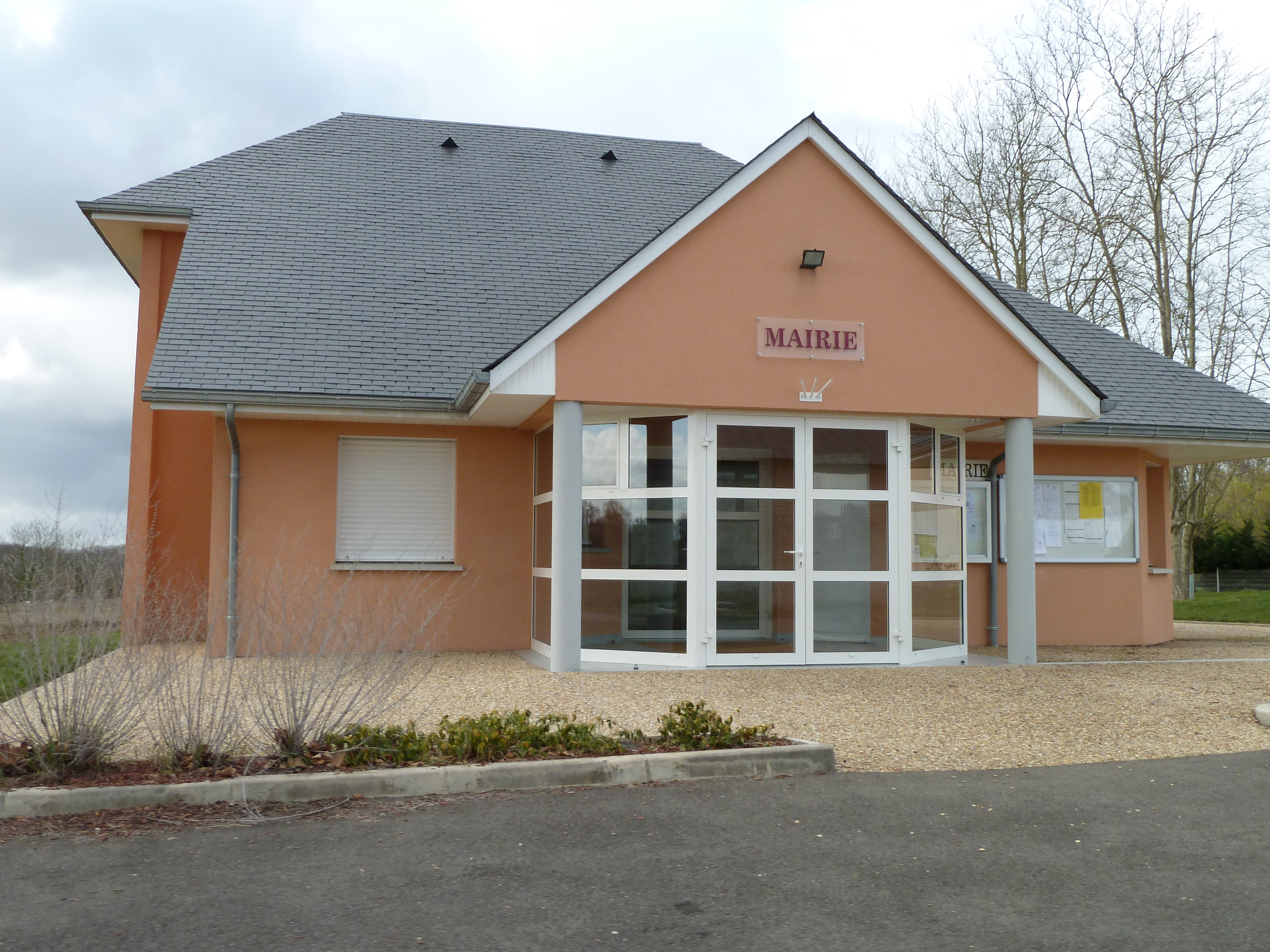
- The town hall of Lamayou
- Location of Lamayou
- Location within France Location within Nouvelle-Aquitaine
- Coordinates: 43°22′58″N 0°01′35″W
- Country: France
- Region: Nouvelle-Aquitaine
- Department: Pyrénées-Atlantiques
- Arrondissement: Pau
- Canton: Pays de Morlaàs et du Montanérès
- Intercommunality: Adour Madiran

Government
  - Mayor (2020–2026): Julien Lacaze
- Area^{1}: 9.51 km^{2} (3.67 sq mi)
- Elevation: 311 m (1,020 ft)
- Highest elevation: 345 m (1,132 ft)
- Lowest elevation: 250 m (820 ft)
- Population (2023): 214
  - Density: 22.5/km^{2} (58.3/sq mi)
- Time zone: UTC+01:00 (CET)
  - Summer (DST): UTC+02:00 (CEST)
- INSEE/Postal code: 64309 /64460
- ^{1} French Land Register data, which excludes lakes, ponds, glaciers > 1 km^{2} (0.386 sq mi or 247 acres) and river estuaries.

Lamayou is a commune in the Pyrénées-Atlantiques department in south-western France.

== See also ==
- Communes of the Pyrénées-Atlantiques department
