= Jardin botanique des Pyrénées occidentales =

Botanical garden and arboretum in Aquitaine, France

Coordinates: 43.3580°N 0.2480°W

The Jardin botanique des Pyrénées occidentales, is a private botanical garden and arboretum located at 42, route de Morlaàs, Saint-Jammes, Pyrénées-Atlantiques, Aquitaine, France. It is open by appointment.

The nursery Florama specializes in trees and shrubs from around the world. Its accompanying botanical garden was created in 1993 by owner Jacques Urban, and is now a member of the Jardins botaniques de France, containing about 1,500 taxa including rare and endangered plants of the Pyrenees.

== See also ==
- List of botanical gardens in France
