= Monségur, Pyrénées-Atlantiques =

Monségur
- Commune
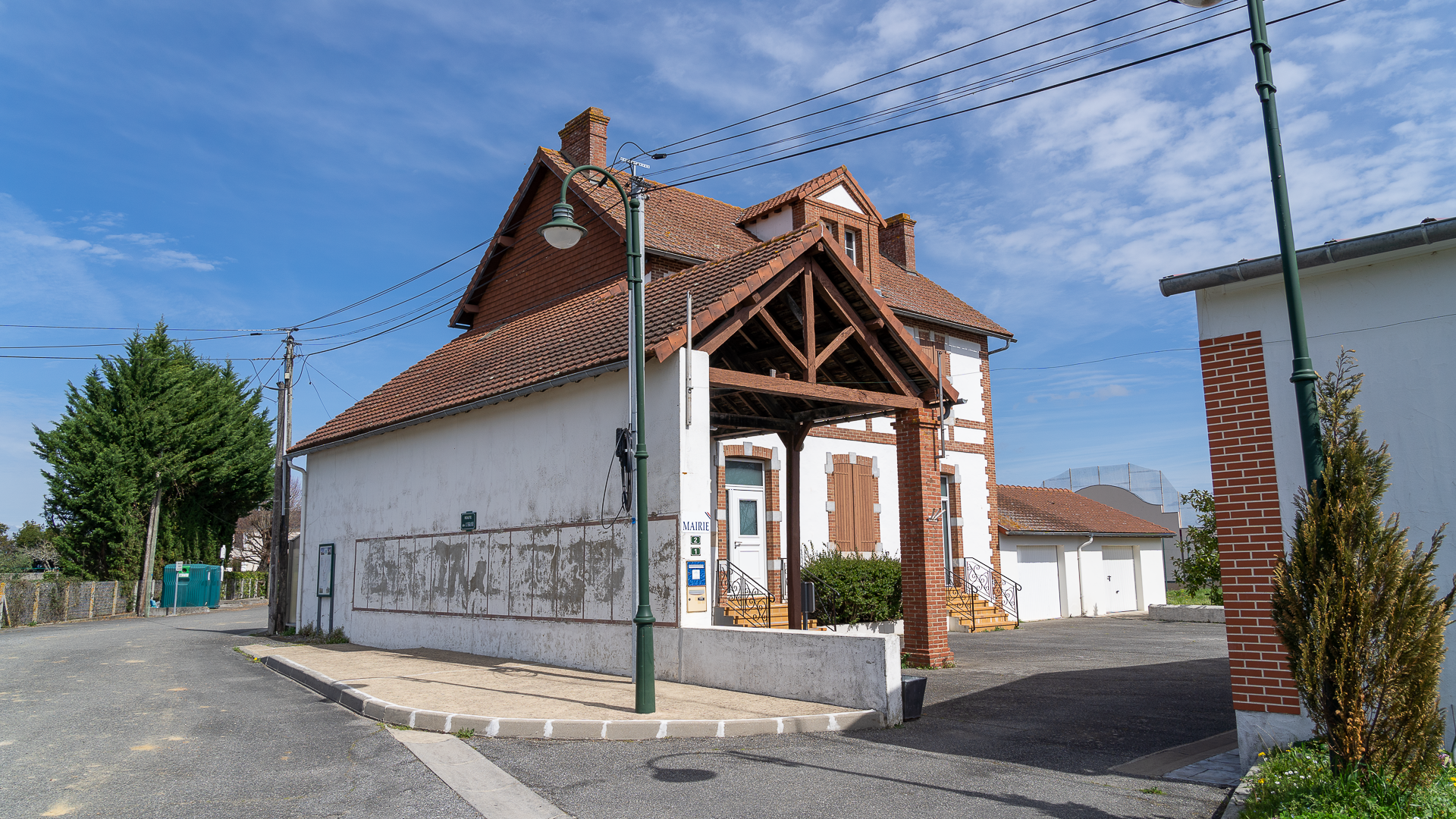
- Monségur Town hall
- Location of Monségur
- Location within France Location within Nouvelle-Aquitaine
- Coordinates: 43°25′56″N 0°00′50″W
- Country: France
- Region: Nouvelle-Aquitaine
- Department: Pyrénées-Atlantiques
- Arrondissement: Pau
- Canton: Pays de Morlaàs et du Montanérès

Government
  - Mayor (2020–2026): Christian Romeyer
- Area^{1}: 2.84 km^{2} (1.10 sq mi)
- Elevation: 304 m (997 ft)
- Highest elevation: 312 m (1,024 ft)
- Lowest elevation: 200 m (660 ft)
- Population (2023): 136
  - Density: 47.9/km^{2} (124/sq mi)
- Time zone: UTC+01:00 (CET)
  - Summer (DST): UTC+02:00 (CEST)
- INSEE/Postal code: 64395 /64460
- ^{1} French Land Register data, which excludes lakes, ponds, glaciers > 1 km^{2} (0.386 sq mi or 247 acres) and river estuaries.

Monségur (French pronunciation: [mɔ̃seɡyʁ]; Occitan: Montsegur) is a commune in the Pyrénées-Atlantiques department in south-western France.

== See also ==
- Communes of the Pyrénées-Atlantiques department
