= Saint-Armou =

- Commune
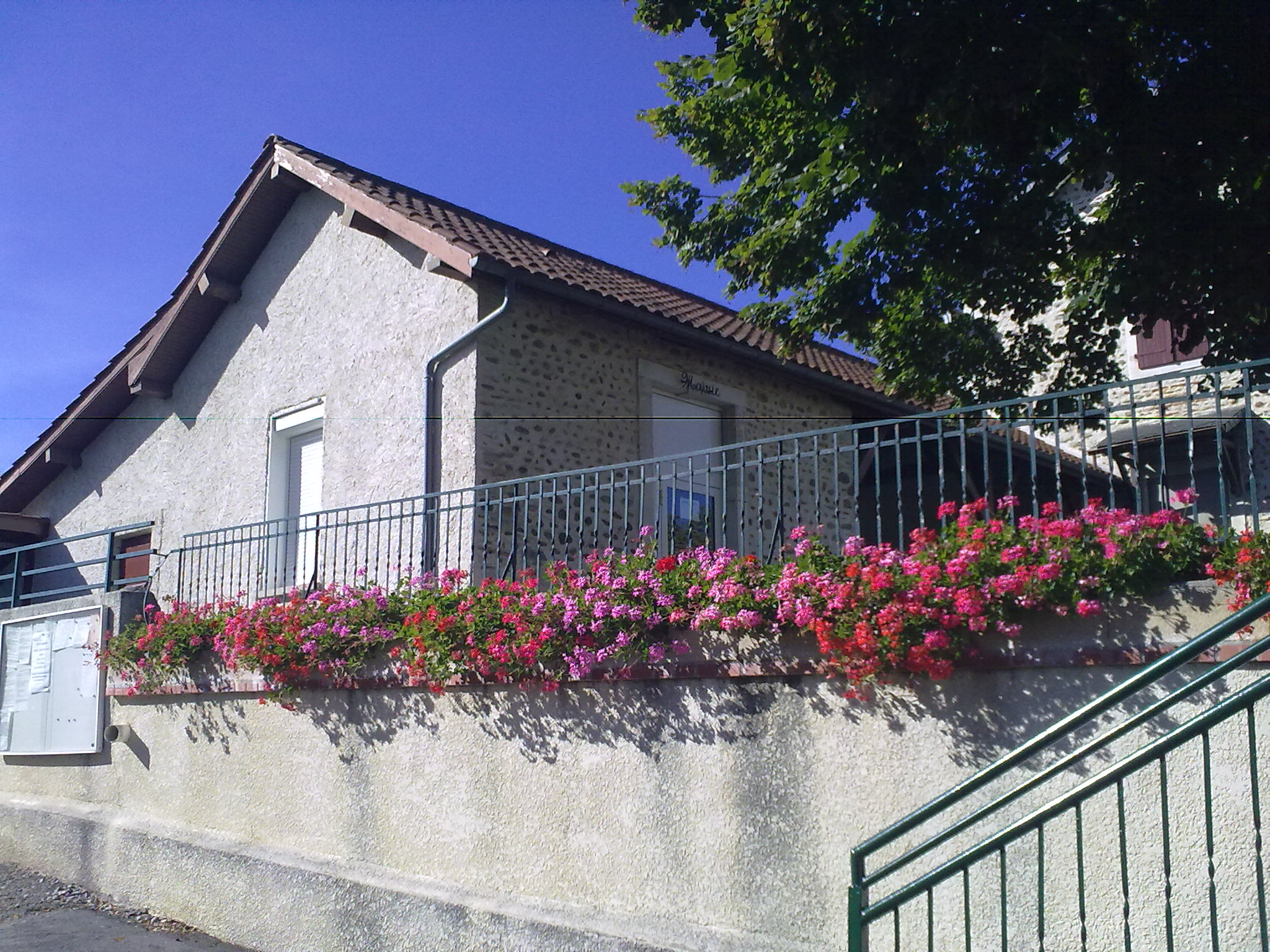
- The town hall of Saint-Armou
- Location of Saint-Armou
- Location within France Location within Nouvelle-Aquitaine
- Coordinates: 43°24′40″N 0°18′22″W
- Country: France
- Region: Nouvelle-Aquitaine
- Department: Pyrénées-Atlantiques
- Arrondissement: Pau
- Canton: Pays de Morlaàs et du Montanérès

Government
  - Mayor (2020–2026): Frédéric Cayrafourcq
- Area^{1}: 12.38 km^{2} (4.78 sq mi)
- Elevation: 195 m (640 ft)
- Highest elevation: 310 m (1,020 ft)
- Lowest elevation: 178 m (584 ft)
- Population (2023): 609
  - Density: 49.2/km^{2} (127/sq mi)
- Time zone: UTC+01:00 (CET)
  - Summer (DST): UTC+02:00 (CEST)
- INSEE/Postal code: 64470 /64160
- ^{1} French Land Register data, which excludes lakes, ponds, glaciers > 1 km^{2} (0.386 sq mi or 247 acres) and river estuaries.

Saint-Armou (French pronunciation: [sɛ̃.t‿aʁmu]; Occitan: Sent Armon) is a commune in the Pyrénées-Atlantiques department in south-western France.

== See also ==
- Communes of the Pyrénées-Atlantiques department
