= Sedze-Maubecq =

- Commune
- Location of Sedze-Maubecq
- Location within France Location within Nouvelle-Aquitaine
- Coordinates: 43°21′12″N 0°07′28″W
- Country: France
- Region: Nouvelle-Aquitaine
- Department: Pyrénées-Atlantiques
- Arrondissement: Pau
- Canton: Pays de Morlaàs et du Montanérès
- Intercommunality: Adour Madiran

Government
  - Mayor (2020–2026): Patrick Baylère
- Area^{1}: 7.61 km^{2} (2.94 sq mi)
- Elevation: 292 m (958 ft)
- Highest elevation: 373 m (1,224 ft)
- Lowest elevation: 237 m (778 ft)
- Population (2023): 225
  - Density: 29.6/km^{2} (76.6/sq mi)
- Time zone: UTC+01:00 (CET)
  - Summer (DST): UTC+02:00 (CEST)
- INSEE/Postal code: 64515 /64160
- ^{1} French Land Register data, which excludes lakes, ponds, glaciers > 1 km^{2} (0.386 sq mi or 247 acres) and river estuaries.

Sedze-Maubecq (French pronunciation: [sɛdz mobɛk]; Occitan: Sètza e Maubèc) is a commune in the Pyrénées-Atlantiques department in south-western France.

== See also ==
- Communes of the Pyrénées-Atlantiques department
