= Sedzère =

- Commune
- Coat of arms
- Location of Sedzère
- Location within France Location within Nouvelle-Aquitaine
- Coordinates: 43°20′29″N 0°10′19″W
- Country: France
- Region: Nouvelle-Aquitaine
- Department: Pyrénées-Atlantiques
- Arrondissement: Pau
- Canton: Pays de Morlaàs et du Montanérès
- Intercommunality: Nord-Est Béarn

Government
  - Mayor (2020–2026): Lucien Larroze
- Area^{1}: 12.59 km^{2} (4.86 sq mi)
- Elevation: 358 m (1,175 ft)
- Highest elevation: 374 m (1,227 ft)
- Lowest elevation: 287 m (942 ft)
- Population (2023): 406
  - Density: 32.2/km^{2} (83.5/sq mi)
- Time zone: UTC+01:00 (CET)
  - Summer (DST): UTC+02:00 (CEST)
- INSEE/Postal code: 64516 /64160
- ^{1} French Land Register data, which excludes lakes, ponds, glaciers > 1 km^{2} (0.386 sq mi or 247 acres) and river estuaries.

Sedzère (French pronunciation: [sɛdzɛʁ]; Occitan: Setzèra) is a commune in the Pyrénées-Atlantiques department in south-western France.

== See also ==
- Communes of the Pyrénées-Atlantiques department
