= Saint-Laurent-Bretagne =

- Commune
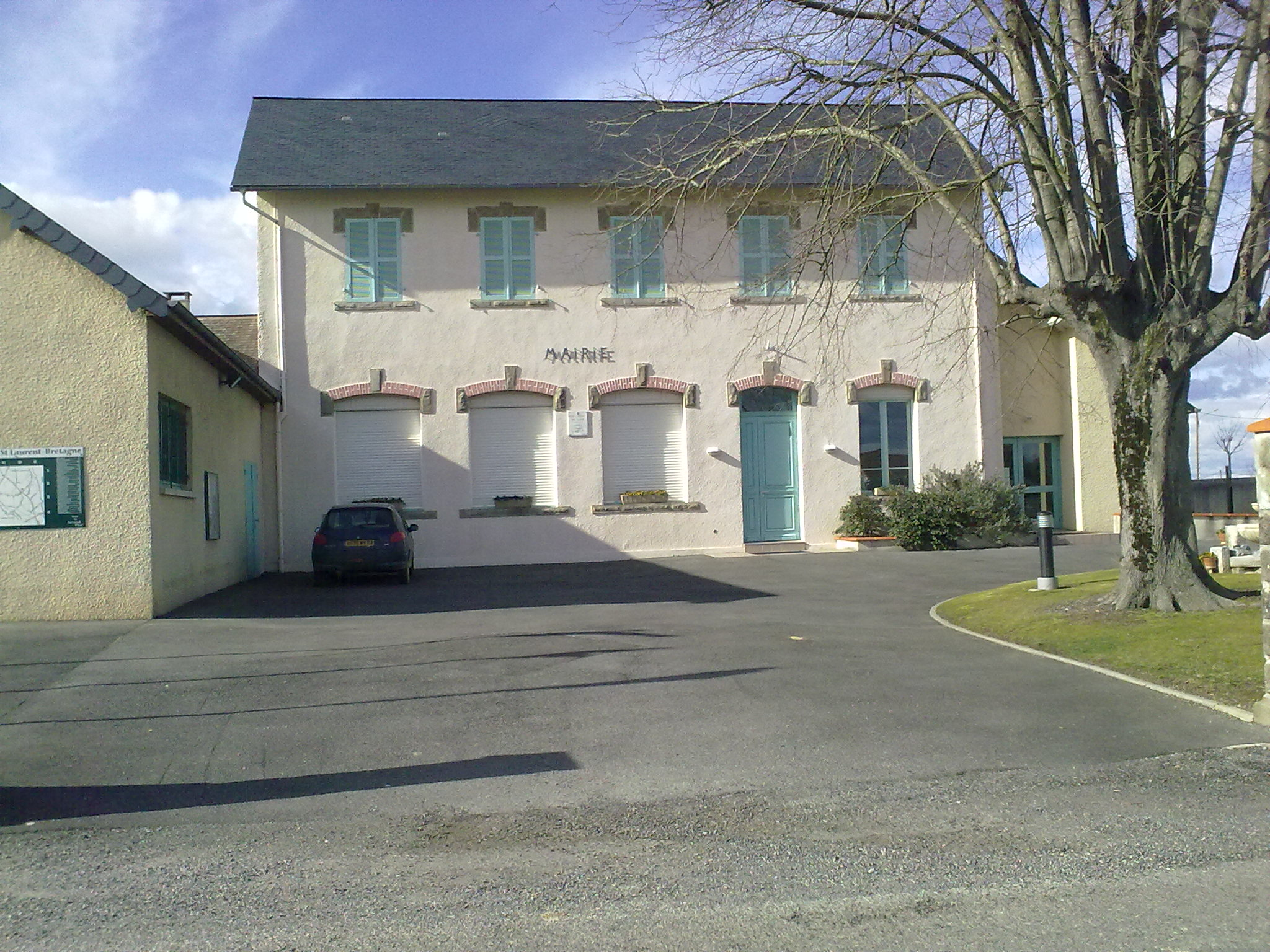
- Town Hall of Saint-Laurent-Bretagne
- Location of Saint-Laurent-Bretagne
- Location within France Location within Nouvelle-Aquitaine
- Coordinates: 43°23′02″N 0°11′53″W
- Country: France
- Region: Nouvelle-Aquitaine
- Department: Pyrénées-Atlantiques
- Arrondissement: Pau
- Canton: Pays de Morlaàs et du Montanérès

Government
  - Mayor (2020–2026): Benoît Mariné
- Area^{1}: 10.59 km^{2} (4.09 sq mi)
- Elevation: 331 m (1,086 ft)
- Highest elevation: 346 m (1,135 ft)
- Lowest elevation: 249 m (817 ft)
- Population (2023): 449
  - Density: 42.4/km^{2} (110/sq mi)
- Time zone: UTC+01:00 (CET)
  - Summer (DST): UTC+02:00 (CEST)
- INSEE/Postal code: 64488 /64160
- ^{1} French Land Register data, which excludes lakes, ponds, glaciers > 1 km^{2} (0.386 sq mi or 247 acres) and river estuaries.

Saint-Laurent-Bretagne (French pronunciation: [sɛ̃ loʁɑ̃ bʁətaɲ]; Occitan: Sent Laurenç e Bretanha) is a commune in the Pyrénées-Atlantiques department in south-western France.

== See also ==
- Communes of the Pyrénées-Atlantiques department
