= Saint-Castin =

- Commune
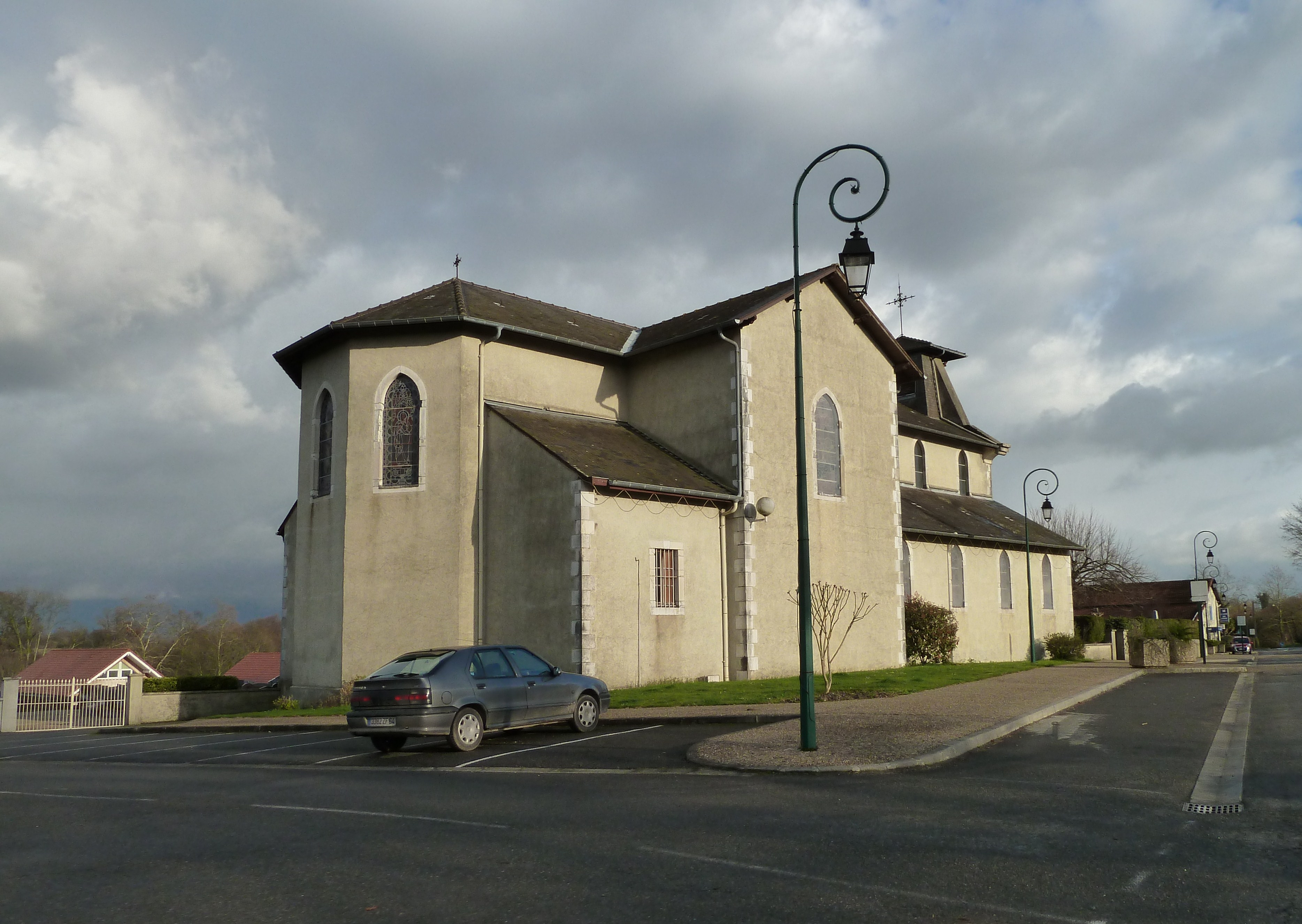
- The church of Saint-Castin
- Location of Saint-Castin
- Location within France Location within Nouvelle-Aquitaine
- Coordinates: 43°22′41″N 0°18′14″W
- Country: France
- Region: Nouvelle-Aquitaine
- Department: Pyrénées-Atlantiques
- Arrondissement: Pau
- Canton: Pays de Morlaàs et du Montanérès

Government
  - Mayor (2020–2026): Serge Zurita
- Area^{1}: 7.00 km^{2} (2.70 sq mi)
- Elevation: 271 m (889 ft)
- Highest elevation: 323 m (1,060 ft)
- Lowest elevation: 213 m (699 ft)
- Population (2023): 862
  - Density: 123/km^{2} (319/sq mi)
- Time zone: UTC+01:00 (CET)
  - Summer (DST): UTC+02:00 (CEST)
- INSEE/Postal code: 64472 /64160
- ^{1} French Land Register data, which excludes lakes, ponds, glaciers > 1 km^{2} (0.386 sq mi or 247 acres) and river estuaries.

Saint-Castin (French pronunciation: [sɛ̃ kastɛ̃]; Occitan: Sent Castin) is a commune in the Pyrénées-Atlantiques department in south-western France. It is located about 15 km north of Pau and 12 km east of Pau-Pyrenees Airport.

The village was the home of the Abbadie de Saint-Castin family of Canadian settlers.

== See also ==
- Communes of the Pyrénées-Atlantiques department
