= Casteide-Doat =

- Commune
- Location of Casteide-Doat
- Location within France Location within Nouvelle-Aquitaine
- Coordinates: 43°22′26″N 0°00′42″W
- Country: France
- Region: Nouvelle-Aquitaine
- Department: Pyrénées-Atlantiques
- Arrondissement: Pau
- Canton: Pays de Morlaàs et du Montanérès
- Intercommunality: Adour Madiran

Government
  - Mayor (2020–2026): Bernard Laurens
- Area^{1}: 5.34 km^{2} (2.06 sq mi)
- Elevation: 297 m (974 ft)
- Highest elevation: 345 m (1,132 ft)
- Lowest elevation: 227 m (745 ft)
- Population (2023): 159
  - Density: 29.8/km^{2} (77.1/sq mi)
- Time zone: UTC+01:00 (CET)
  - Summer (DST): UTC+02:00 (CEST)
- INSEE/Postal code: 64173 /64460
- ^{1} French Land Register data, which excludes lakes, ponds, glaciers > 1 km^{2} (0.386 sq mi or 247 acres) and river estuaries.

Casteide-Doat (French pronunciation: [kastɛd dɔat]; Occitan: Castèida e Doat) is a commune in the Pyrénées-Atlantiques department in south-western France.

== See also ==
- Communes of the Pyrénées-Atlantiques department
