= Canton of Pays de Morlaàs et du Montanérès =

Canton of France

Coordinates: 43.34°N 0.26°W

The canton of Pays de Morlaàs et du Montanérès is an administrative division of the Pyrénées-Atlantiques department, southwestern France. It was created at the French canton reorganisation which came into effect in March 2015. Its seat is in Morlaàs.

It consists of the following communes:

1. Abère
2. Andoins
3. Anos
4. Arrien
5. Artigueloutan
6. Baleix
7. Barinque
8. Bédeille
9. Bentayou-Sérée
10. Bernadets
11. Buros
12. Casteide-Doat
13. Castéra-Loubix
14. Escoubès
15. Eslourenties-Daban
16. Espéchède
17. Gabaston
18. Higuères-Souye
19. Labatut-Figuières
20. Lamayou
21. Lée
22. Lespourcy
23. Lombia
24. Maucor
25. Maure
26. Momy
27. Monségur
28. Montaner
29. Morlaàs
30. Ouillon
31. Ousse
32. Ponson-Debat-Pouts
33. Pontiacq-Viellepinte
34. Riupeyrous
35. Saint-Armou
36. Saint-Castin
37. Saint-Jammes
38. Saint-Laurent-Bretagne
39. Saubole
40. Sedze-Maubecq
41. Sedzère
42. Sendets
43. Serres-Morlaàs
44. Urost
