= Lespourcy =

- Commune
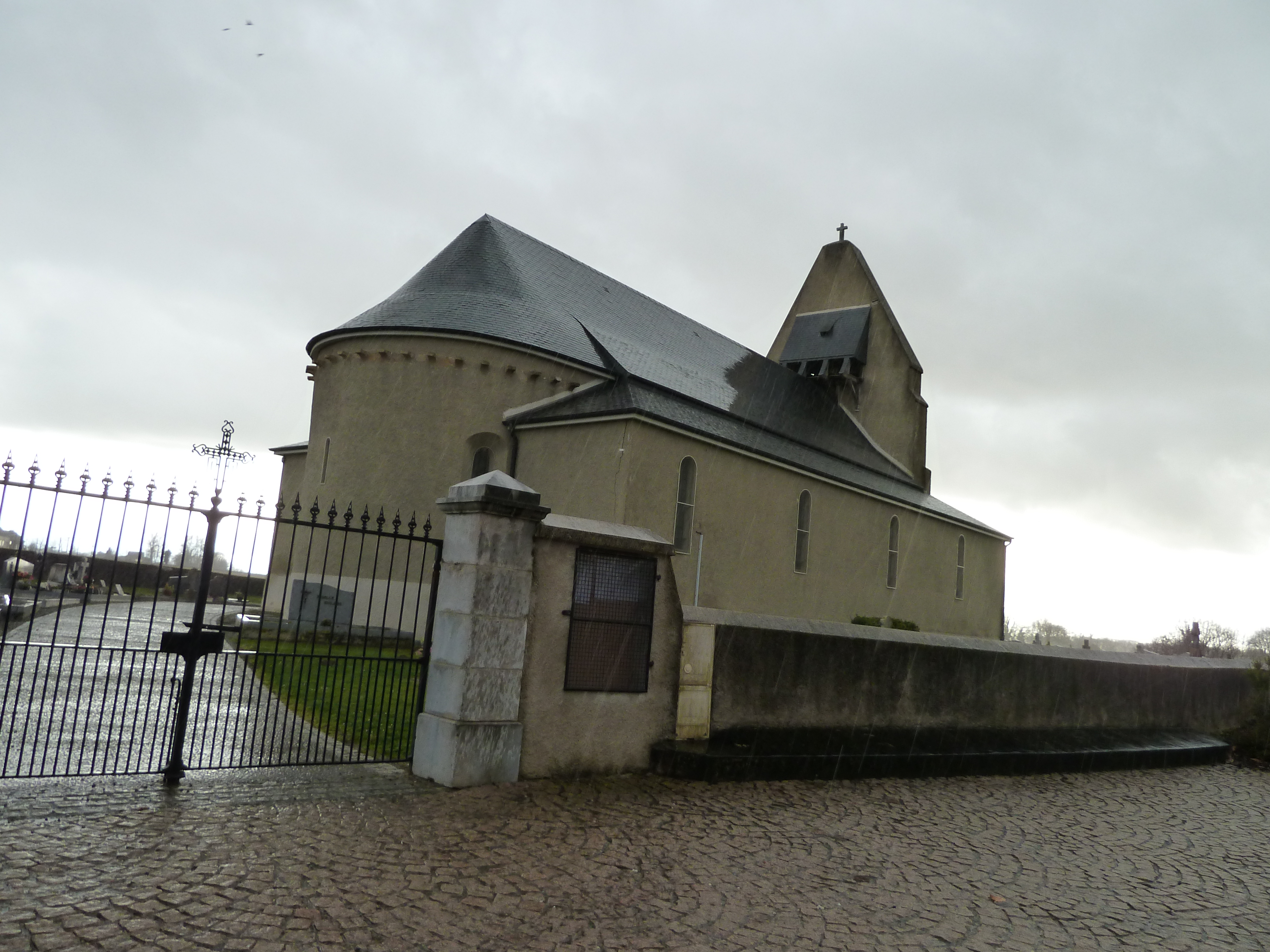
- The church of Lespourcy
- Location of Lespourcy
- Location within France Location within Nouvelle-Aquitaine
- Coordinates: 43°21′41″N 0°08′56″W
- Country: France
- Region: Nouvelle-Aquitaine
- Department: Pyrénées-Atlantiques
- Arrondissement: Pau
- Canton: Pays de Morlaàs et du Montanérès
- Intercommunality: Nord-Est Béarn

Government
  - Mayor (2020–2026): Éric Nouny
- Area^{1}: 7.09 km^{2} (2.74 sq mi)
- Elevation: 346 m (1,135 ft)
- Highest elevation: 364 m (1,194 ft)
- Lowest elevation: 260 m (850 ft)
- Population (2023): 178
  - Density: 25.1/km^{2} (65.0/sq mi)
- Time zone: UTC+01:00 (CET)
  - Summer (DST): UTC+02:00 (CEST)
- INSEE/Postal code: 64338 /64160
- ^{1} French Land Register data, which excludes lakes, ponds, glaciers > 1 km^{2} (0.386 sq mi or 247 acres) and river estuaries.

Lespourcy (French pronunciation: [lɛspuʁsi]; Occitan: Lesporcin) is a commune in the Pyrénées-Atlantiques department in south-western France.

== See also ==
- Communes of the Pyrénées-Atlantiques department
