= Castéra-Loubix =

- Commune
- Location of Castéra-Loubix
- Location within France Location within Nouvelle-Aquitaine
- Coordinates: 43°24′11″N 0°01′59″W
- Country: France
- Region: Nouvelle-Aquitaine
- Department: Pyrénées-Atlantiques
- Arrondissement: Pau
- Canton: Pays de Morlaàs et du Montanérès
- Intercommunality: Adour Madiran

Government
  - Mayor (2024–2026): François Tisne
- Area^{1}: 3.43 km^{2} (1.32 sq mi)
- Elevation: 279 m (915 ft)
- Highest elevation: 323 m (1,060 ft)
- Lowest elevation: 208 m (682 ft)
- Population (2023): 51
  - Density: 15/km^{2} (39/sq mi)
- Time zone: UTC+01:00 (CET)
  - Summer (DST): UTC+02:00 (CEST)
- INSEE/Postal code: 64174 /64460
- ^{1} French Land Register data, which excludes lakes, ponds, glaciers > 1 km^{2} (0.386 sq mi or 247 acres) and river estuaries.

Castéra-Loubix (Occitan: Castèra) is a commune in the Pyrénées-Atlantiques department in south-western France.

== See also ==
- Communes of the Pyrénées-Atlantiques department
