= Lombia =

Lompia
- Commune
- Location of Lompia
- Location within France Location within Nouvelle-Aquitaine
- Coordinates: 43°19′48″N 0°07′59″W
- Country: France
- Region: Nouvelle-Aquitaine
- Department: Pyrénées-Atlantiques
- Arrondissement: Pau
- Canton: Pays de Morlaàs et du Montanérès
- Intercommunality: Nord-Est Béarn

Government
  - Mayor (2020–2026): Bernard Cacheiro
- Area^{1}: 7.63 km^{2} (2.95 sq mi)
- Elevation: 339 m (1,112 ft)
- Highest elevation: 2,134 m (7,001 ft)
- Lowest elevation: 284 m (932 ft)
- Population (2023): 206
  - Density: 27.0/km^{2} (69.9/sq mi)
- Time zone: UTC+01:00 (CET)
  - Summer (DST): UTC+02:00 (CEST)
- INSEE/Postal code: 64346 /64160
- ^{1} French Land Register data, which excludes lakes, ponds, glaciers > 1 km^{2} (0.386 sq mi or 247 acres) and river estuaries.

Lombia (French pronunciation: [lɔ̃bja]; Occitan: Lombiar) is a commune in the Pyrénées-Atlantiques department in south-western France.

== See also ==
- Communes of the Pyrénées-Atlantiques department
