= Riupeyrous =

- Commune
- Location of Riupeyrous
- Location within France Location within Nouvelle-Aquitaine
- Coordinates: 43°24′N 0°14′W
- Country: France
- Region: Nouvelle-Aquitaine
- Department: Pyrénées-Atlantiques
- Arrondissement: Pau
- Canton: Pays de Morlaàs et du Montanérès

Government
  - Mayor (2020–2026): Alban Lacaze
- Area^{1}: 4.81 km^{2} (1.86 sq mi)
- Elevation: 286 m (938 ft)
- Highest elevation: 311 m (1,020 ft)
- Lowest elevation: 236 m (774 ft)
- Population (2023): 240
  - Density: 50/km^{2} (130/sq mi)
- Time zone: UTC+01:00 (CET)
  - Summer (DST): UTC+02:00 (CEST)
- INSEE/Postal code: 64465 /64160
- ^{1} French Land Register data, which excludes lakes, ponds, glaciers > 1 km^{2} (0.386 sq mi or 247 acres) and river estuaries.

Riupeyrous (French pronunciation: [ʁjypeʁus]; Occitan: Riupeirós) is a commune in the Pyrénées-Atlantiques department and Nouvelle-Aquitaine region of south-western France.

== Population ==
Historical population
Year	Pop.	±% p.a.
1968	127	—
1975	136	+0.98%
1982	165	+2.80%
1990	180	+1.09%
1999	151	−1.93%
2007	165	+1.11%
2012	164	−0.12%
2017	214	+5.47%
2023	240	+1.93%
Source: INSEE

== See also ==
- Communes of the Pyrénées-Atlantiques department
