= Labatut-Figuières =

- Commune
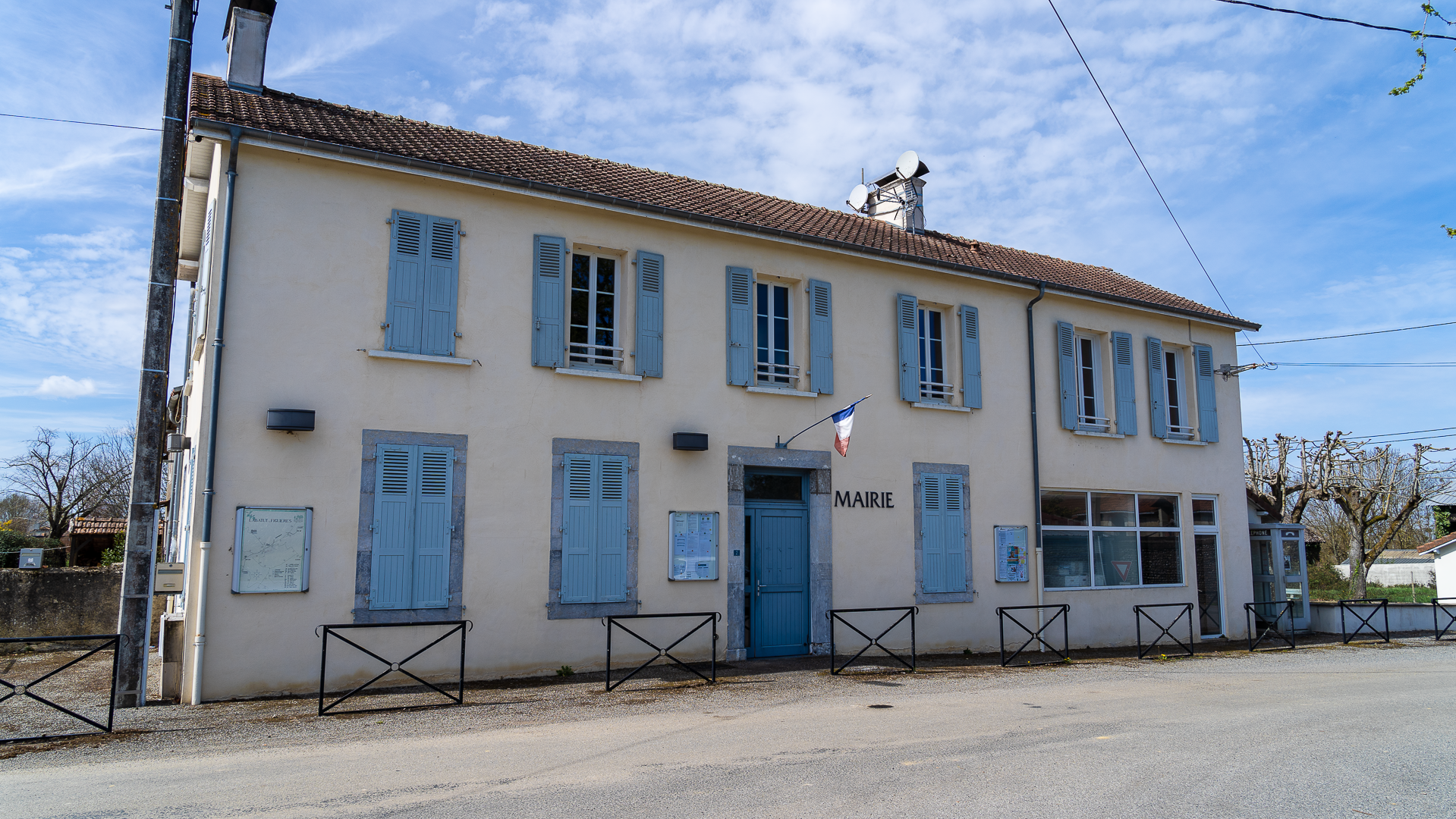
- Location of Labatut-Figuières
- Location within France Location within Nouvelle-Aquitaine
- Coordinates: 43°25′27″N 0°01′10″W
- Country: France
- Region: Nouvelle-Aquitaine
- Department: Pyrénées-Atlantiques
- Arrondissement: Pau
- Canton: Pays de Morlaàs et du Montanérès
- Intercommunality: Adour Madiran

Government
  - Mayor (2020–2026): Jean-Marc Laffitte
- Area^{1}: 8.44 km^{2} (3.26 sq mi)
- Elevation: 259 m (850 ft)
- Highest elevation: 325 m (1,066 ft)
- Lowest elevation: 199 m (653 ft)
- Population (2023): 172
  - Density: 20.4/km^{2} (52.8/sq mi)
- Time zone: UTC+01:00 (CET)
  - Summer (DST): UTC+02:00 (CEST)
- INSEE/Postal code: 64293 /64460
- ^{1} French Land Register data, which excludes lakes, ponds, glaciers > 1 km^{2} (0.386 sq mi or 247 acres) and river estuaries.

Labatut-Figuières (French pronunciation: [labaty fiɡjɛʁ]; before 2022: Labatut; Occitan: L'Abatut e Higuèra) is a commune in the Pyrénées-Atlantiques department in south-western France.

== See also ==
- Communes of the Pyrénées-Atlantiques department
