= Saubole =

- Commune
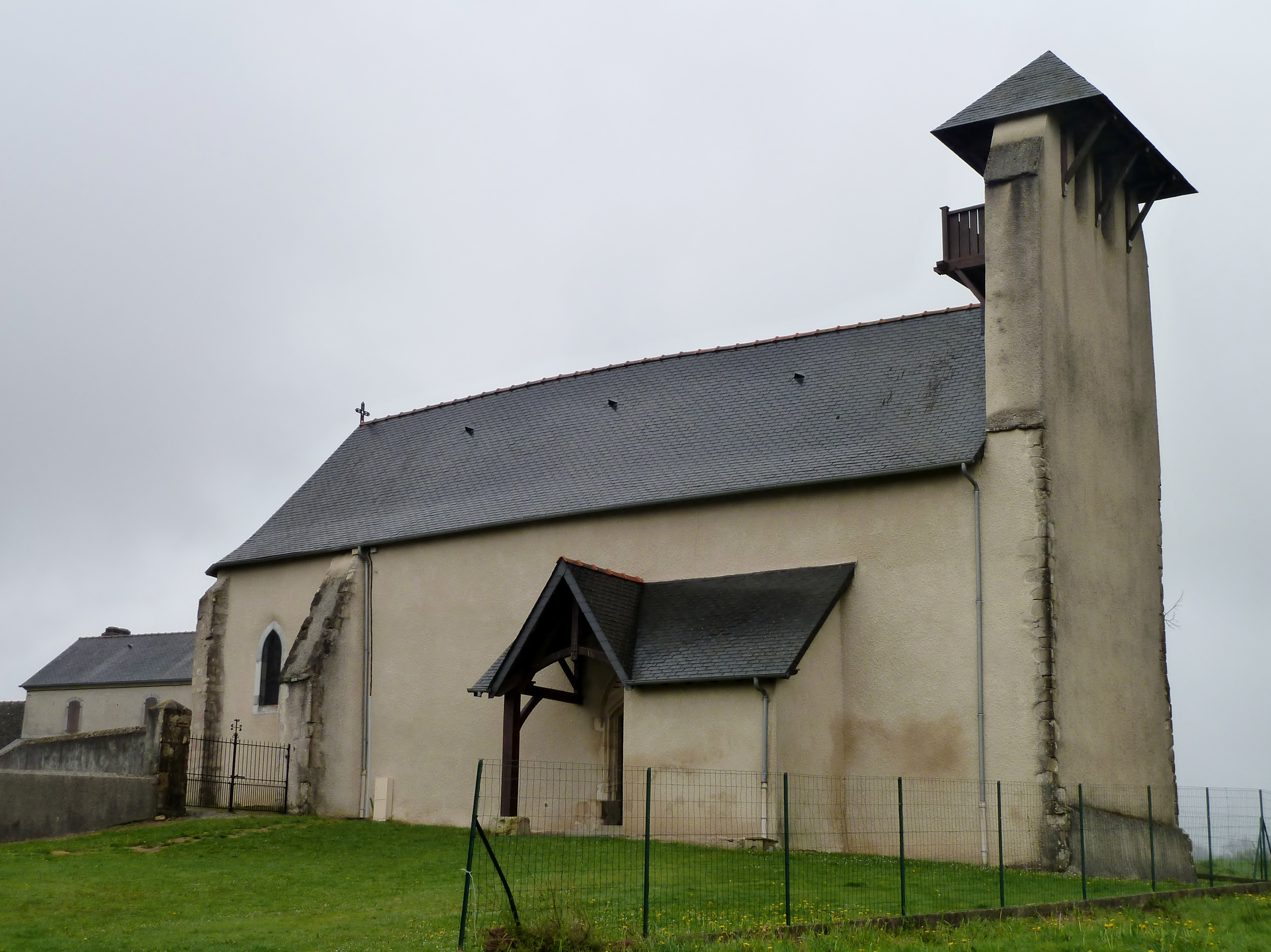
- The church of Saubole
- Location of Saubole
- Location within France Location within Nouvelle-Aquitaine
- Coordinates: 43°18′49″N 0°07′26″W
- Country: France
- Region: Nouvelle-Aquitaine
- Department: Pyrénées-Atlantiques
- Arrondissement: Pau
- Canton: Pays de Morlaàs et du Montanérès
- Intercommunality: Nord-Est Béarn

Government
  - Mayor (2020–2026): Bernard Lasserre
- Area^{1}: 5.10 km^{2} (1.97 sq mi)
- Elevation: 339 m (1,112 ft)
- Highest elevation: 391 m (1,283 ft)
- Lowest elevation: 318 m (1,043 ft)
- Population (2023): 156
  - Density: 30.6/km^{2} (79.2/sq mi)
- Time zone: UTC+01:00 (CET)
  - Summer (DST): UTC+02:00 (CEST)
- INSEE/Postal code: 64507 /64420
- ^{1} French Land Register data, which excludes lakes, ponds, glaciers > 1 km^{2} (0.386 sq mi or 247 acres) and river estuaries.

Saubole (French pronunciation: [sobɔl]; Occitan: Seuvòla) is a commune in the Pyrénées-Atlantiques department in south-western France.

== See also ==
- Communes of the Pyrénées-Atlantiques department
