= Escoubès =

- Commune
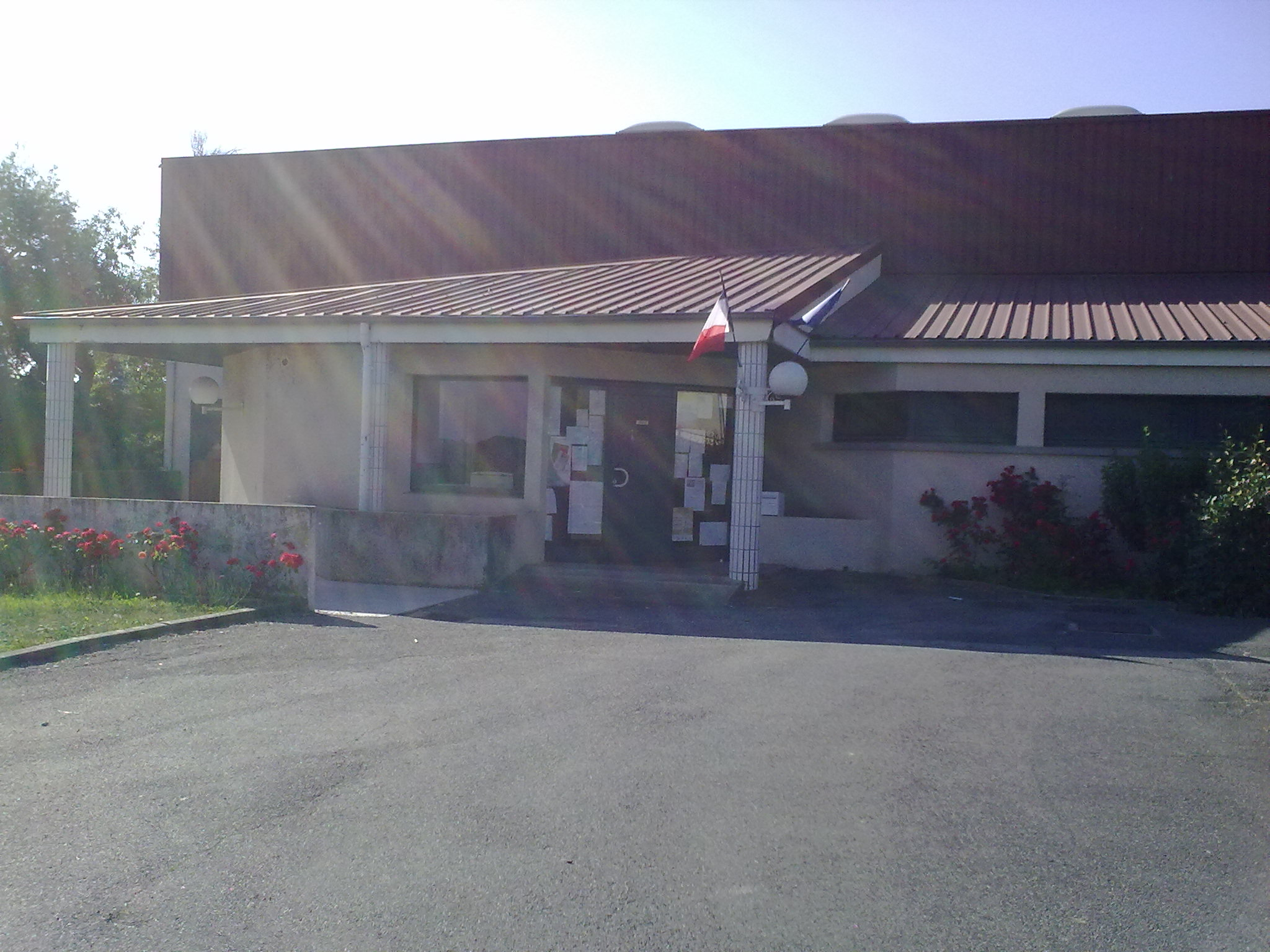
- The town hall of Escoubès
- Location of Escoubès
- Location within France Location within Nouvelle-Aquitaine
- Coordinates: 43°25′07″N 0°14′36″W
- Country: France
- Region: Nouvelle-Aquitaine
- Department: Pyrénées-Atlantiques
- Arrondissement: Pau
- Canton: Pays de Morlaàs et du Montanérès
- Intercommunality: Nord-Est Béarn

Government
  - Mayor (2023–2026): Nathalie Larrieu
- Area^{1}: 6.44 km^{2} (2.49 sq mi)
- Elevation: 281 m (922 ft)
- Highest elevation: 285 m (935 ft)
- Lowest elevation: 217 m (712 ft)
- Population (2023): 416
  - Density: 64.6/km^{2} (167/sq mi)
- Time zone: UTC+01:00 (CET)
  - Summer (DST): UTC+02:00 (CEST)
- INSEE/Postal code: 64208 /64160
- ^{1} French Land Register data, which excludes lakes, ponds, glaciers > 1 km^{2} (0.386 sq mi or 247 acres) and river estuaries.

Escoubès (French pronunciation: [ɛskubɛs]; Occitan: Escobés) is a commune in the Pyrénées-Atlantiques department in south-western France.

== See also ==
- Communes of the Pyrénées-Atlantiques department
