= Pontiacq-Viellepinte =

- Commune
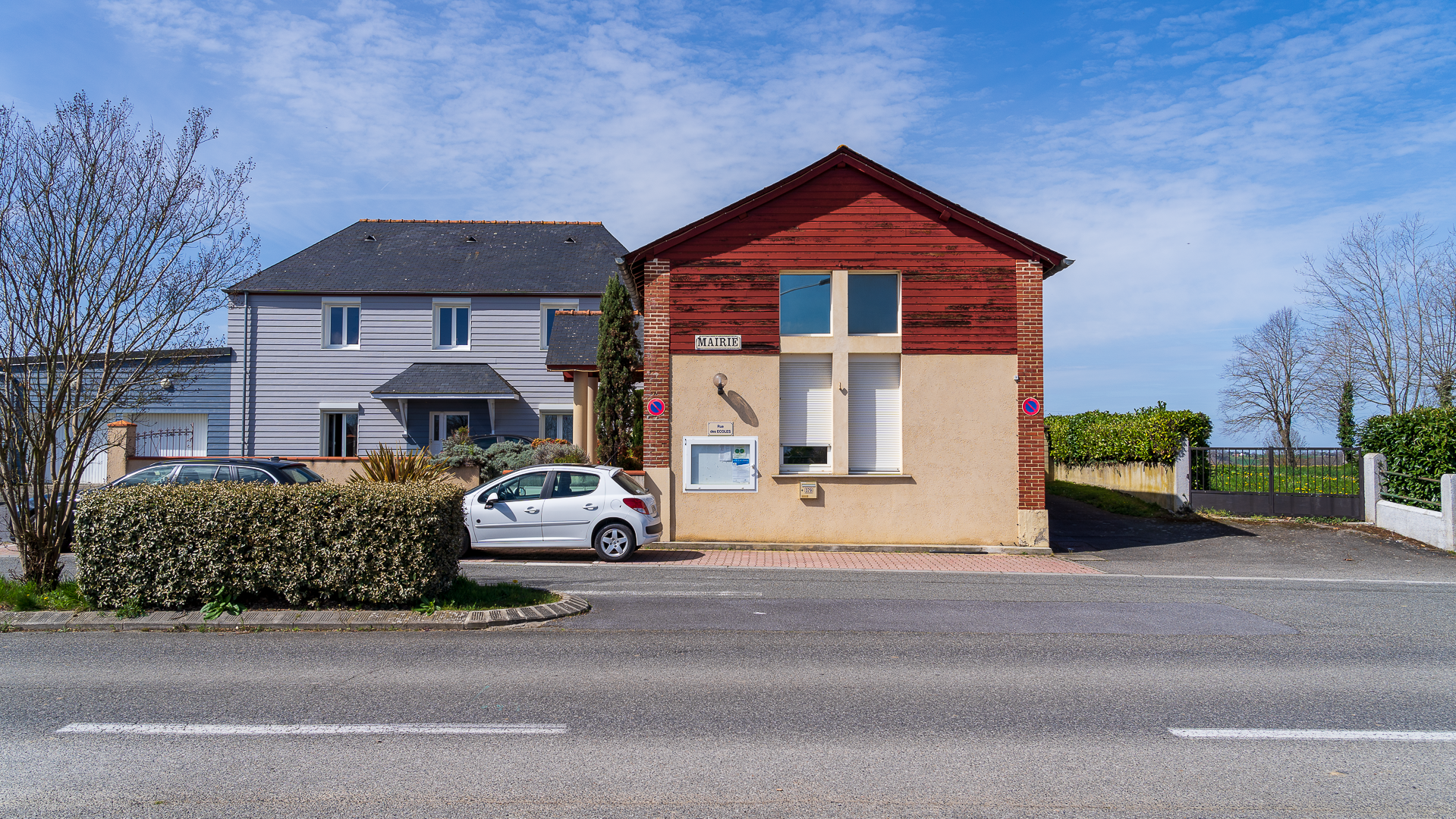
- Location of Pontiacq-Viellepinte
- Location within France Location within Nouvelle-Aquitaine
- Coordinates: 43°21′42″N 0°03′02″W
- Country: France
- Region: Nouvelle-Aquitaine
- Department: Pyrénées-Atlantiques
- Arrondissement: Pau
- Canton: Pays de Morlaàs et du Montanérès
- Intercommunality: Adour Madiran

Government
  - Mayor (2020–2026): David Pigneaux
- Area^{1}: 6.98 km^{2} (2.69 sq mi)
- Elevation: 340 m (1,120 ft)
- Highest elevation: 356 m (1,168 ft)
- Lowest elevation: 249 m (817 ft)
- Population (2023): 170
  - Density: 24/km^{2} (63/sq mi)
- Time zone: UTC+01:00 (CET)
  - Summer (DST): UTC+02:00 (CEST)
- INSEE/Postal code: 64454 /64460
- ^{1} French Land Register data, which excludes lakes, ponds, glaciers > 1 km^{2} (0.386 sq mi or 247 acres) and river estuaries.

Pontiacq-Viellepinte (French pronunciation: [pɔ̃tjak vjɛlpɛ̃t]; Occitan: Pontiac e Vièlapinta) is a commune in the Pyrénées-Atlantiques department in south-western France.

== See also ==
- Communes of the Pyrénées-Atlantiques department
