= Ponson-Debat-Pouts =

- Commune
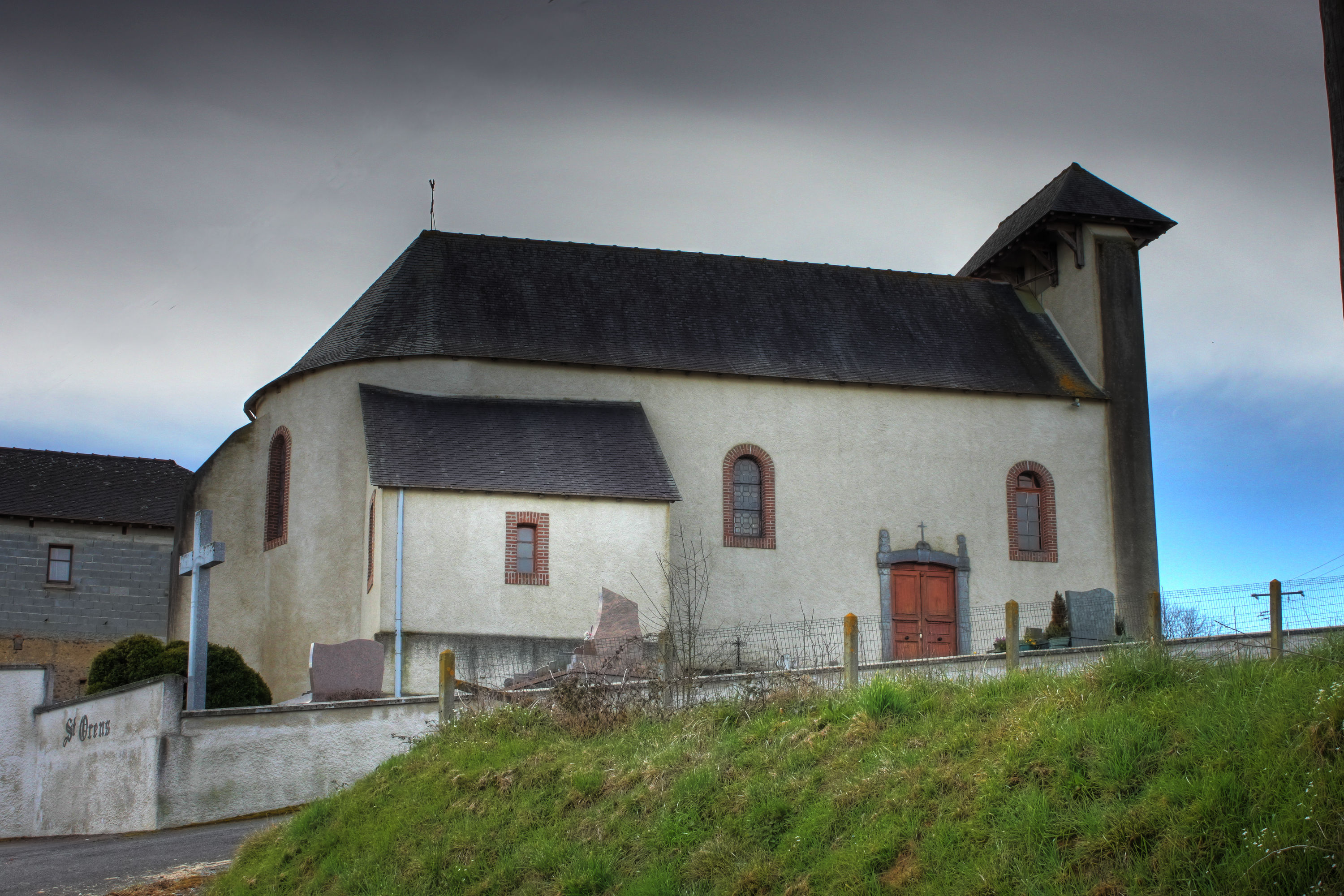
- St Orens church, Ponson-Debat-Pouts
- Location of Ponson-Debat-Pouts
- Location within France Location within Nouvelle-Aquitaine
- Coordinates: 43°19′50″N 0°02′24″W
- Country: France
- Region: Nouvelle-Aquitaine
- Department: Pyrénées-Atlantiques
- Arrondissement: Pau
- Canton: Pays de Morlaàs et du Montanérès
- Intercommunality: Adour Madiran

Government
  - Mayor (2020–2026): Franck Bocher
- Area^{1}: 5.72 km^{2} (2.21 sq mi)
- Elevation: 337 m (1,106 ft)
- Highest elevation: 373 m (1,224 ft)
- Lowest elevation: 268 m (879 ft)
- Population (2023): 94
  - Density: 16/km^{2} (43/sq mi)
- Time zone: UTC+01:00 (CET)
  - Summer (DST): UTC+02:00 (CEST)
- INSEE/Postal code: 64451 /64460
- ^{1} French Land Register data, which excludes lakes, ponds, glaciers > 1 km^{2} (0.386 sq mi or 247 acres) and river estuaries.

Ponson-Debat-Pouts is a commune in the Pyrénées-Atlantiques department and Nouvelle-Aquitaine region of south-western France.

== See also ==
- Communes of the Pyrénées-Atlantiques department
