= Ouillon =

- Commune
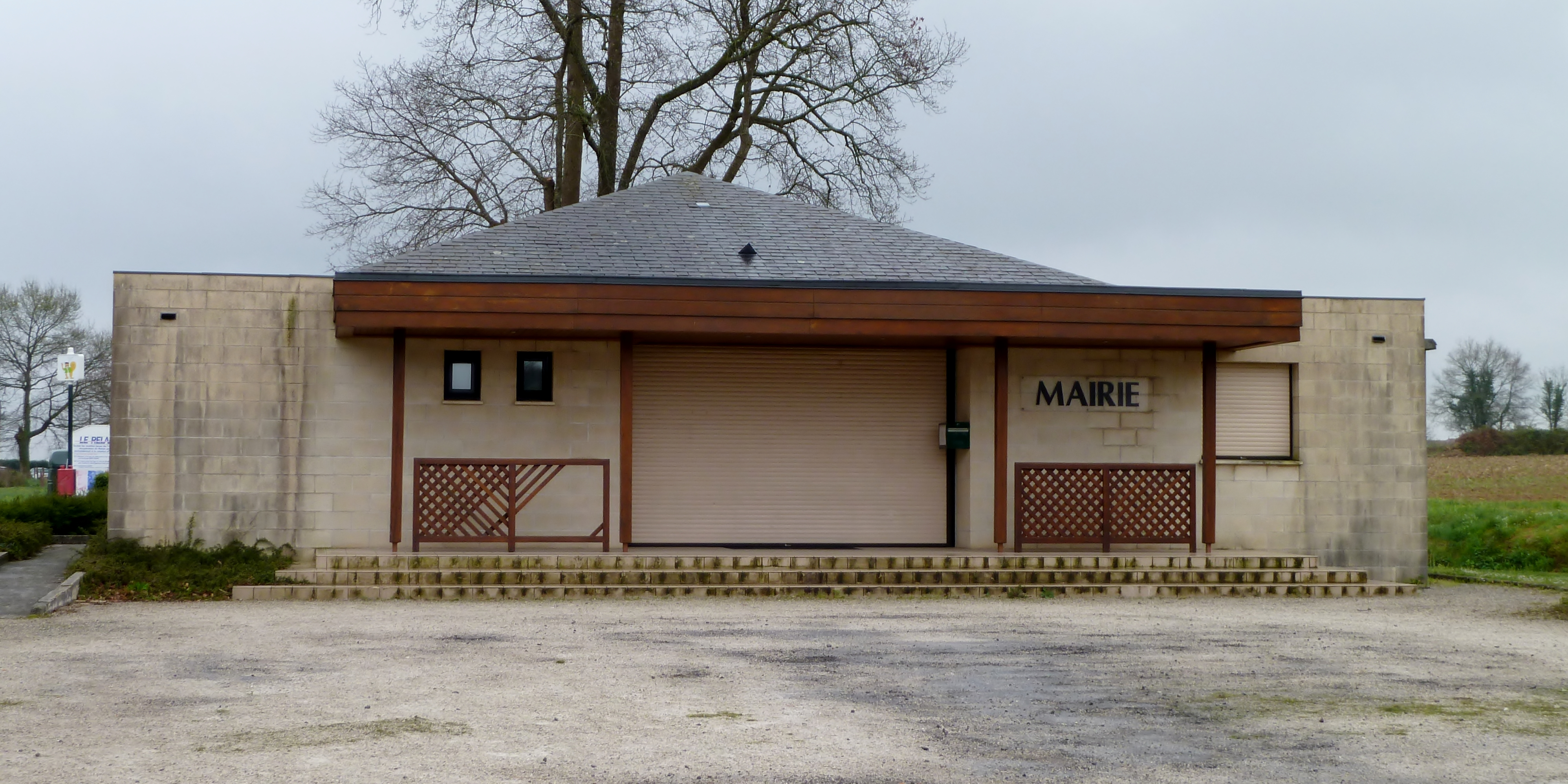
- The town hall of Ouillon
- Location of Ouillon
- Location within France Location within Nouvelle-Aquitaine
- Coordinates: 43°19′17″N 0°13′33″W
- Country: France
- Region: Nouvelle-Aquitaine
- Department: Pyrénées-Atlantiques
- Arrondissement: Pau
- Canton: Pays de Morlaàs et du Montanérès
- Intercommunality: Nord-Est Béarn

Government
  - Mayor (2020–2026): Jean-Marc Fourcade
- Area^{1}: 6.38 km^{2} (2.46 sq mi)
- Elevation: 328 m (1,076 ft)
- Highest elevation: 338 m (1,109 ft)
- Lowest elevation: 288 m (945 ft)
- Population (2023): 553
  - Density: 86.7/km^{2} (224/sq mi)
- Time zone: UTC+01:00 (CET)
  - Summer (DST): UTC+02:00 (CEST)
- INSEE/Postal code: 64438 /64160
- ^{1} French Land Register data, which excludes lakes, ponds, glaciers > 1 km^{2} (0.386 sq mi or 247 acres) and river estuaries.

Ouillon (French pronunciation: [ujɔ̃]; Occitan: Aulhon) is a commune in the Pyrénées-Atlantiques department in south-western France.

== See also ==
- Communes of the Pyrénées-Atlantiques department
