= Serres-Morlaàs =

- Commune
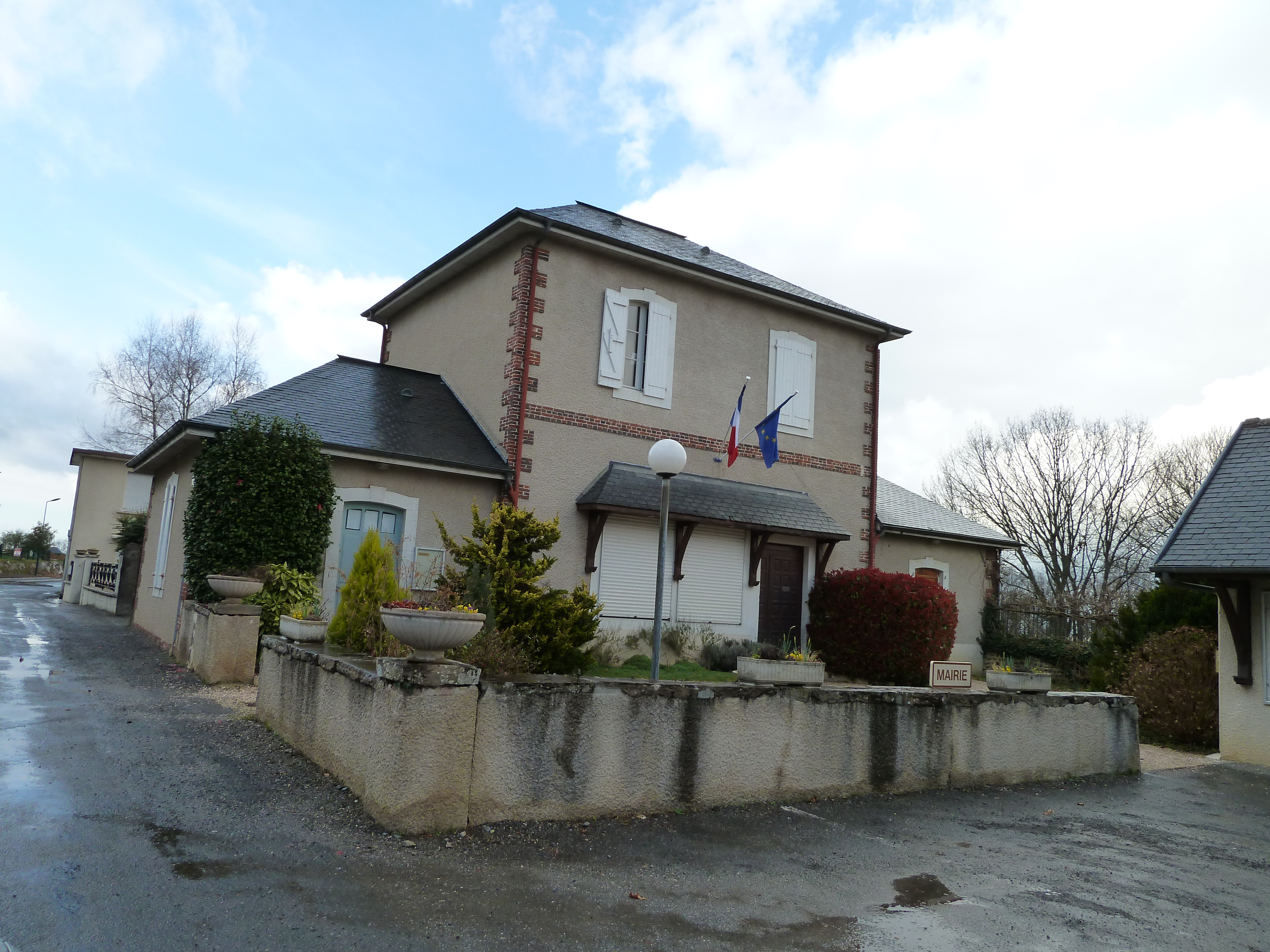
- The town hall of Serres-Morlaàs
- Location of Serres-Morlaàs
- Location within France Location within Nouvelle-Aquitaine
- Coordinates: 43°19′39″N 0°15′24″W
- Country: France
- Region: Nouvelle-Aquitaine
- Department: Pyrénées-Atlantiques
- Arrondissement: Pau
- Canton: Pays de Morlaàs et du Montanérès
- Intercommunality: Nord-Est Béarn

Government
  - Mayor (2020–2026): Pierre Bregegere
- Area^{1}: 13.15 km^{2} (5.08 sq mi)
- Elevation: 304 m (997 ft)
- Highest elevation: 349 m (1,145 ft)
- Lowest elevation: 233 m (764 ft)
- Population (2023): 870
  - Density: 66/km^{2} (170/sq mi)
- Time zone: UTC+01:00 (CET)
  - Summer (DST): UTC+02:00 (CEST)
- INSEE/Postal code: 64520 /64160
- ^{1} French Land Register data, which excludes lakes, ponds, glaciers > 1 km^{2} (0.386 sq mi or 247 acres) and river estuaries.

Serres-Morlaàs (French pronunciation: [sɛʁ mɔʁlas]; Occitan: Sèrra Morlans) is a commune in the Pyrénées-Atlantiques department in south-western France.

== See also ==
- Communes of the Pyrénées-Atlantiques department
