= Maucor =

- Commune
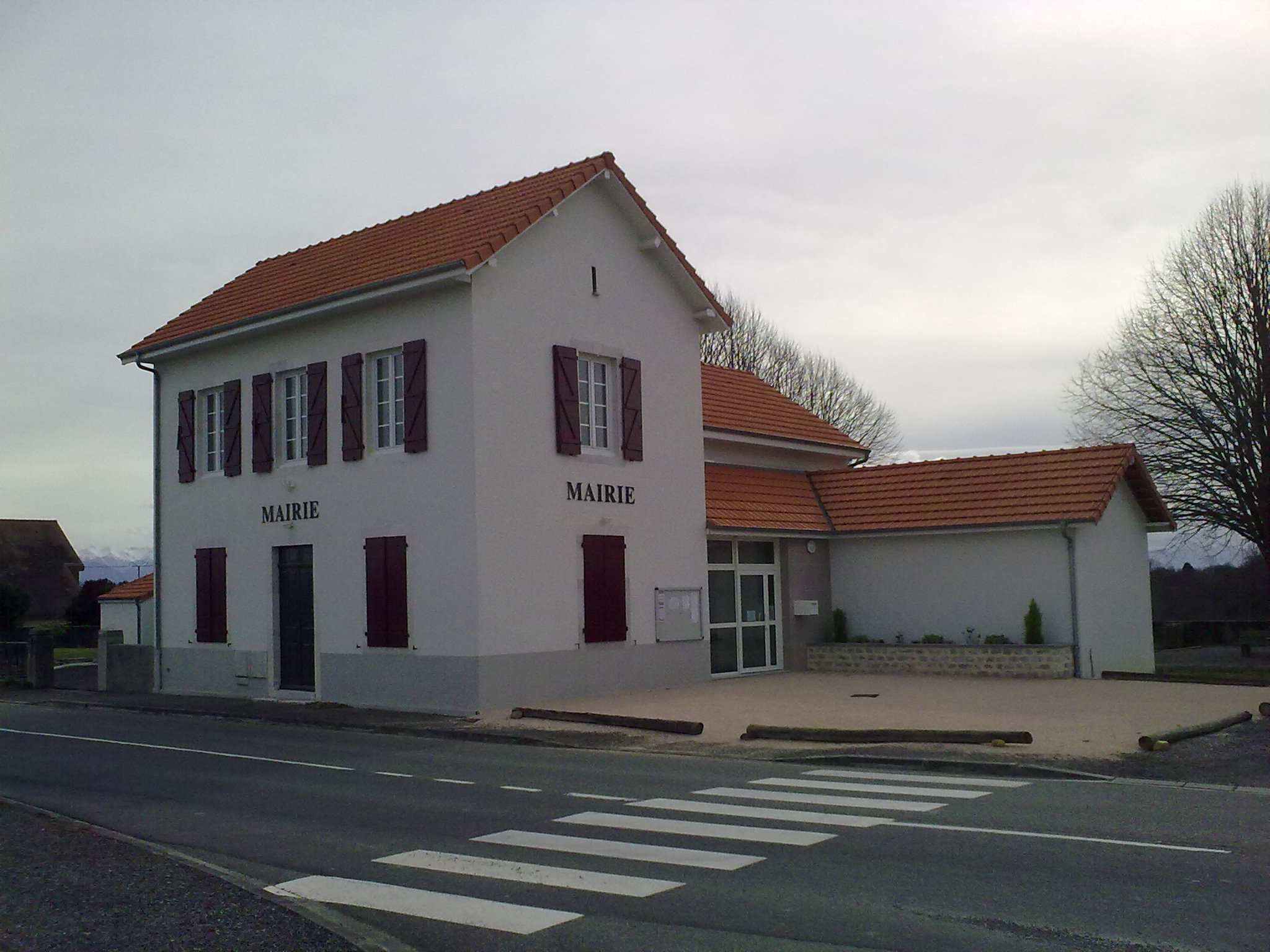
- Town Hall of Maucor
- Location of Maucor
- Location within France Location within Nouvelle-Aquitaine
- Coordinates: 43°21′20″N 0°16′56″W
- Country: France
- Region: Nouvelle-Aquitaine
- Department: Pyrénées-Atlantiques
- Arrondissement: Pau
- Canton: Pays de Morlaàs et du Montanérès
- Intercommunality: Nord-Est Béarn

Government
  - Mayor (2020–2026): Robert Carter
- Area^{1}: 4.92 km^{2} (1.90 sq mi)
- Elevation: 308 m (1,010 ft)
- Highest elevation: 344 m (1,129 ft)
- Lowest elevation: 235 m (771 ft)
- Population (2023): 564
  - Density: 115/km^{2} (297/sq mi)
- Time zone: UTC+01:00 (CET)
  - Summer (DST): UTC+02:00 (CEST)
- INSEE/Postal code: 64370 /64160
- ^{1} French Land Register data, which excludes lakes, ponds, glaciers > 1 km^{2} (0.386 sq mi or 247 acres) and river estuaries.

Maucor (French pronunciation: [mokɔʁ]; Occitan: Maucòr) is a commune in the Pyrénées-Atlantiques department in south-western France.

== See also ==
- Communes of the Pyrénées-Atlantiques department
