= Bernadets =

- Commune
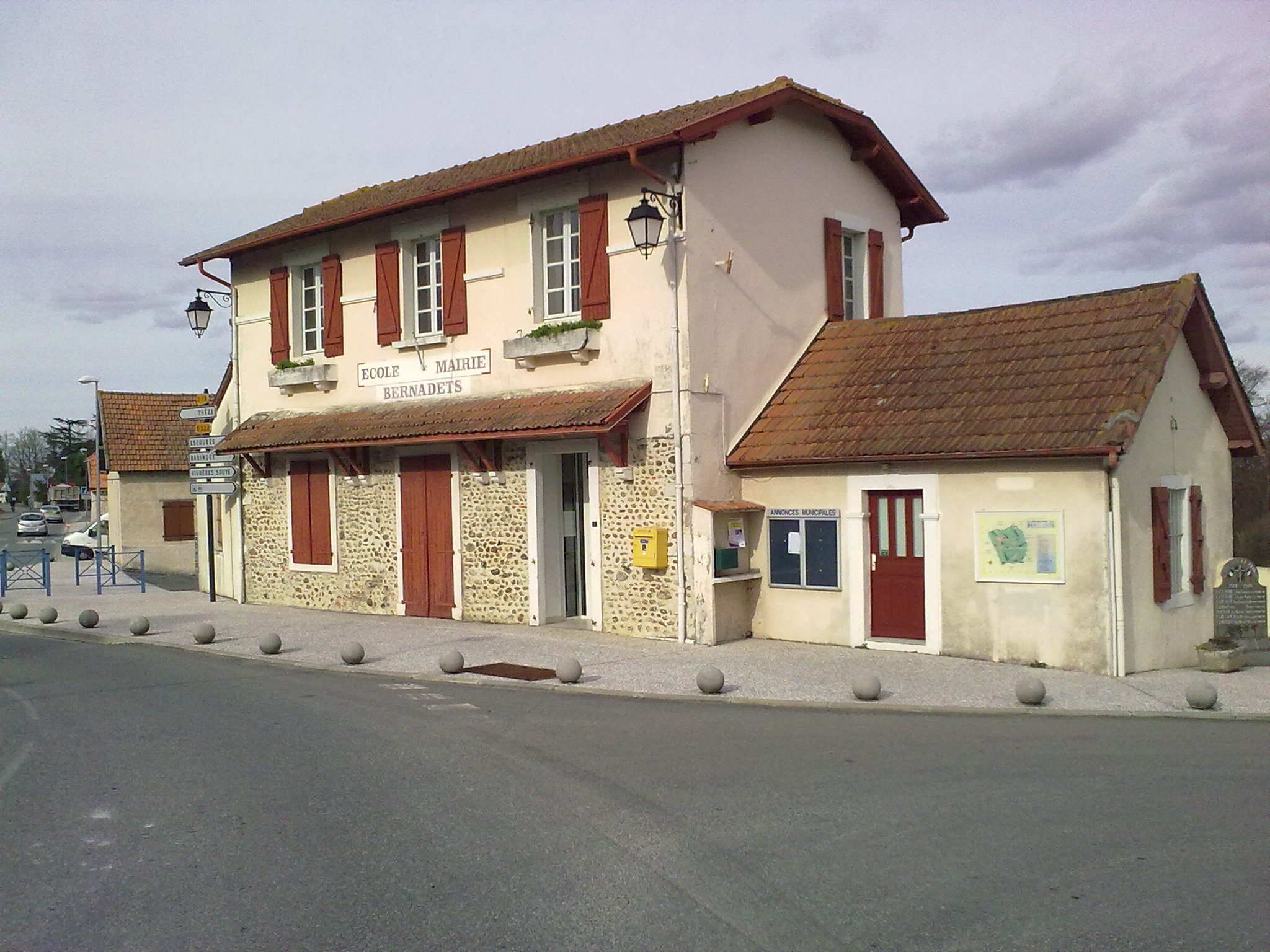
- Town hall

- Coat of arms
- Location of Bernadets
- Location within France Location within Nouvelle-Aquitaine
- Coordinates: 43°22′35″N 0°17′16″W
- Country: France
- Region: Nouvelle-Aquitaine
- Department: Pyrénées-Atlantiques
- Arrondissement: Pau
- Canton: Pays de Morlaàs et du Montanérès
- Intercommunality: Nord-Est Béarn

Government
  - Mayor (2020–2026): Jean-Paul Vidailhet
- Area^{1}: 3.68 km^{2} (1.42 sq mi)
- Elevation: 264 m (866 ft)
- Highest elevation: 325 m (1,066 ft)
- Lowest elevation: 220 m (720 ft)
- Population (2023): 587
  - Density: 160/km^{2} (413/sq mi)
- Time zone: UTC+01:00 (CET)
  - Summer (DST): UTC+02:00 (CEST)
- INSEE/Postal code: 64114 /64160
- ^{1} French Land Register data, which excludes lakes, ponds, glaciers > 1 km^{2} (0.386 sq mi or 247 acres) and river estuaries.

Bernadets (French pronunciation: [bɛʁnadɛts]; Occitan: Vernadèths) is a commune of the Pyrénées-Atlantiques department in southwestern France.

== See also ==
- Communes of the Pyrénées-Atlantiques department
