= Higuères-Souye =

- Commune
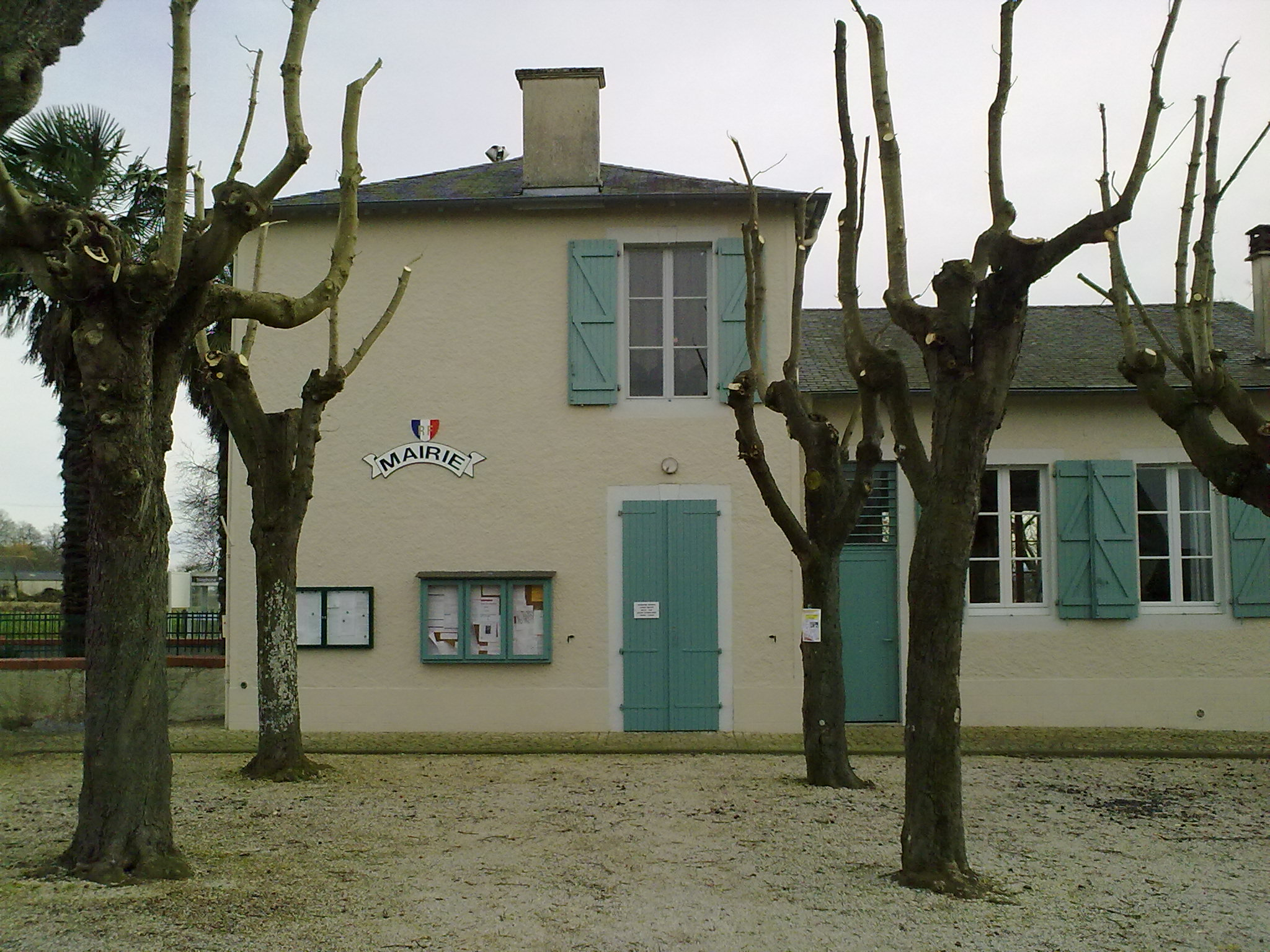
- Town Hall of Higuères-Souye
- Location of Higuères-Souye
- Location within France Location within Nouvelle-Aquitaine
- Coordinates: 43°22′45″N 0°15′31″W
- Country: France
- Region: Nouvelle-Aquitaine
- Department: Pyrénées-Atlantiques
- Arrondissement: Pau
- Canton: Pays de Morlaàs et du Montanérès
- Intercommunality: Nord-Est Béarn

Government
  - Mayor (2020–2026): Christophe Marquis
- Area^{1}: 7.35 km^{2} (2.84 sq mi)
- Elevation: 280 m (920 ft)
- Highest elevation: 298 m (978 ft)
- Lowest elevation: 225 m (738 ft)
- Population (2023): 284
  - Density: 38.6/km^{2} (100/sq mi)
- Time zone: UTC+01:00 (CET)
  - Summer (DST): UTC+02:00 (CEST)
- INSEE/Postal code: 64262 /64160
- ^{1} French Land Register data, which excludes lakes, ponds, glaciers > 1 km^{2} (0.386 sq mi or 247 acres) and river estuaries.

Higuères-Souye (French pronunciation: [iɡɛʁ suj]; Occitan: Higuèra e Soja) is a commune in the Pyrénées-Atlantiques department in south-western France.

== See also ==
- Communes of the Pyrénées-Atlantiques department
