= Gabaston =

- Commune
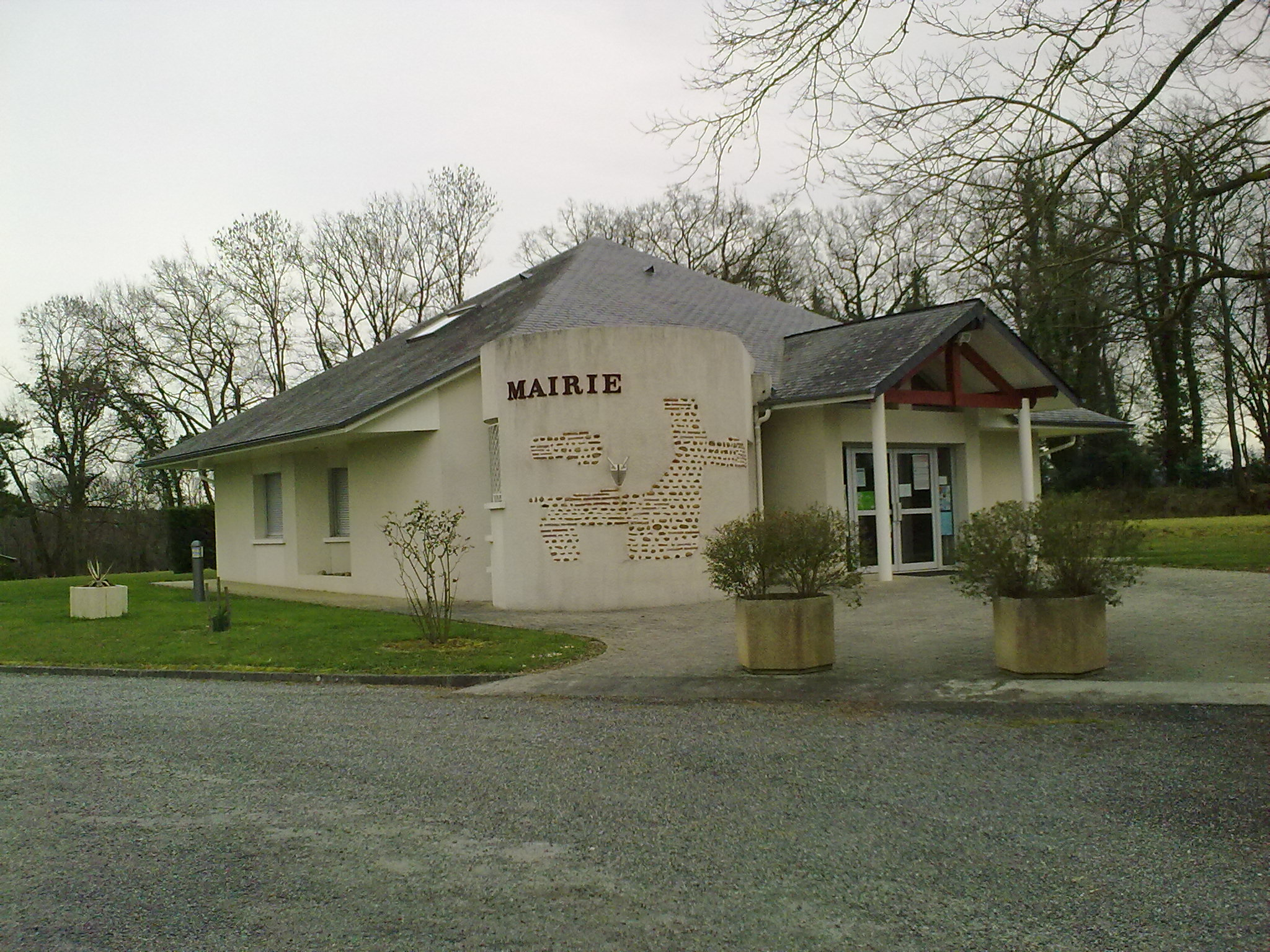
- Town Hall of Gabaston
- Location of Gabaston
- Location within France Location within Nouvelle-Aquitaine
- Coordinates: 43°21′39″N 0°12′26″W
- Country: France
- Region: Nouvelle-Aquitaine
- Department: Pyrénées-Atlantiques
- Arrondissement: Pau
- Canton: Pays de Morlaàs et du Montanérès
- Intercommunality: Nord-Est Béarn

Government
  - Mayor (2020–2026): Guy Cazalet
- Area^{1}: 12.73 km^{2} (4.92 sq mi)
- Elevation: 288 m (945 ft)
- Highest elevation: 345 m (1,132 ft)
- Lowest elevation: 265 m (869 ft)
- Population (2023): 673
  - Density: 52.9/km^{2} (137/sq mi)
- Time zone: UTC+01:00 (CET)
  - Summer (DST): UTC+02:00 (CEST)
- INSEE/Postal code: 64227 /64160
- ^{1} French Land Register data, which excludes lakes, ponds, glaciers > 1 km^{2} (0.386 sq mi or 247 acres) and river estuaries.

Gabaston (French pronunciation: [ɡabastɔ̃]; Occitan: Gavaston) is a commune in the Pyrénées-Atlantiques department in south-western France.

== Population ==
Historical population
Year	Pop.	±% p.a.
1968	342	—
1975	458	+4.26%
1982	592	+3.73%
1990	602	+0.21%
1999	562	−0.76%
2007	599	+0.80%
2012	611	+0.40%
2017	662	+1.62%
2023	673	+0.28%
Source: INSEE

== Hydrography ==
Gabaston is watered by the Gabas river which flows through the town. The river was known as the fluvius gavasensis in 982.

== Notable Personalities ==
Piers Gaveston (vers 1282-1312), Gascon knight, favorite of King Edward II of England.

== See also ==
- Communes of the Pyrénées-Atlantiques department
