= Leize =

Hydronymic word

Leize is a widespread hydronymic root meaning 'pit', or 'ravine'. It appears in modern Basque dictionaries as leze 'cave'.

It may be found at the origin of river or place names as:

== Rivers and valleys ==
- the Leitzaran (from Leize Haran 'valley of the Leize'), a river from Leitza in Navarre
- the Léez, a left tributary of the Adour
- the Léès, a right tributary of the Léez
- the Leze, a river flowing through a cave in Araia
- the Lèze, a left tributary of the Ariège
- the Lèze and the Lezà, two small tributaries of the Baïse de Lasseube
- the Lez (river), a coastal river in Hérault
- the Lez (Salat), a left tributary of the Salat (Ariège)
- the Lez (Rhône), a left tributary of the Rhône
- the Leza,
- the Lezo, in La Rioja, Spain
- the Lizonne or Nizonne, a tributary of the Dronne (Dordogne basin)
- the Lizou, a tributary of the Arcis (Adour basin)
- the Lis or Lys, a left tributary of the Échez (Adour basin)
- the Lis or Lys, a right tributary of the Bouès (Adour basin)
- the Lis Circus where the ski resort of Cauterets is located.
- the Lis Valley near Luchon in the Pyrenees.
- the Lys, a left tributary of the Layon (Anjou).

On the other hand, the Lys or Leie is based on another root, the Gaulish word liga 'silt'.

== Municipalities ==
- Lées-Athas, commune of the Aspe Valley (Pyrénées-Atlantiques)
- Les, municipality of the Val d'Aran.
- Lez, commune of Haute-Garonne
- Lez, former commune of Aveyron, today integrated into Taussac
- Lez, village of the commune of Saint-Béat in Haute-Garonne.
- Lys, commune of Pyrénées-Atlantiques
- Saint-Lys (ex Saint-Nicolas de Lys), commune in the southwest of Toulouse.
- Leizpartz, a hamlet of Saint-Étienne-de-Baïgorry

== Antroponyms ==
- Lexeia, an antiquated Aquitanian and Basque female name, for example, documentary film director, Lexeia Larrañaga de Val.

== See also ==
- Loch
