= Aurensan, Gers =

Aurensan
- Commune
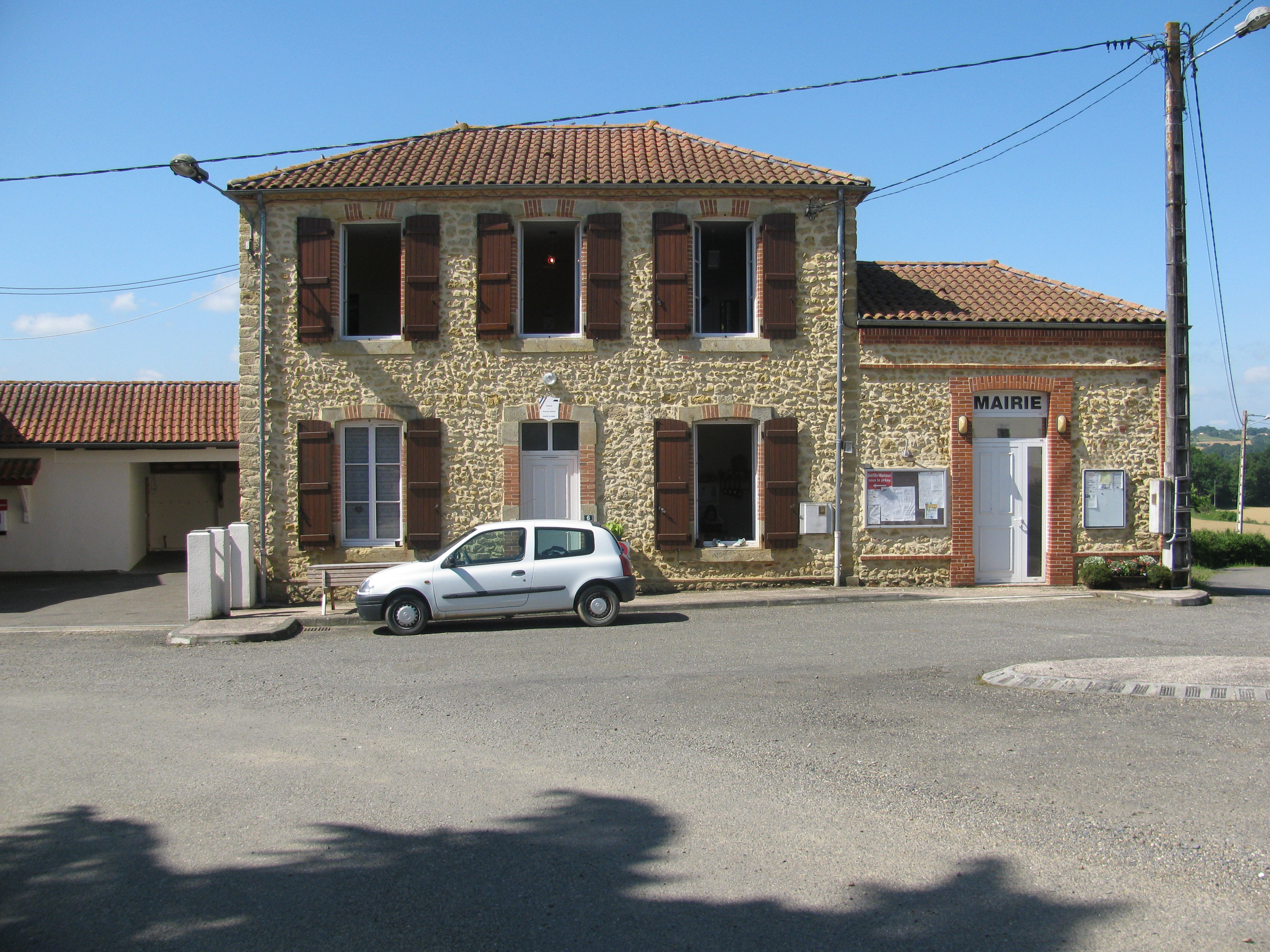
- The town hall in Aurensan

- Coat of arms
- Location of Aurensan
- Location within France Location within Occitanie
- Coordinates: 43°37′09″N 0°12′09″W
- Country: France
- Region: Occitania
- Department: Gers
- Arrondissement: Mirande
- Canton: Adour-Gersoise
- Intercommunality: CC Aire-sur-l'Adour

Government
  - Mayor (2020–2026): Roland Dupouts
- Area^{1}: 6.33 km^{2} (2.44 sq mi)
- Elevation: 170 m (560 ft)
- Highest elevation: 228 m (748 ft)
- Lowest elevation: 94 m (308 ft)
- Population (2023): 131
  - Density: 20.7/km^{2} (53.6/sq mi)
- Time zone: UTC+01:00 (CET)
  - Summer (DST): UTC+02:00 (CEST)
- INSEE/Postal code: 32017 /32400
- ^{1} French Land Register data, which excludes lakes, ponds, glaciers > 1 km^{2} (0.386 sq mi or 247 acres) and river estuaries.

Aurensan is a commune in the Gers department in southwestern France. Historically and culturally, the commune is in the Rivière-Basse region, a territory that stretches along the middle valley of the Adour, where the river makes a bend between Bigorre and Gers.

Exposed to a modified oceanic climate, it is drained by the Larcis River, the Claquessot stream, and two other waterways.

Aurensan is a rural commune with a population of 132 in 2022, having reached a peak of 337 inhabitants in 1851. It is part of the catchment area of Aire-sur-l'Adour. Its inhabitants are called Aurensannais or Aurensannaises.

== Geography ==
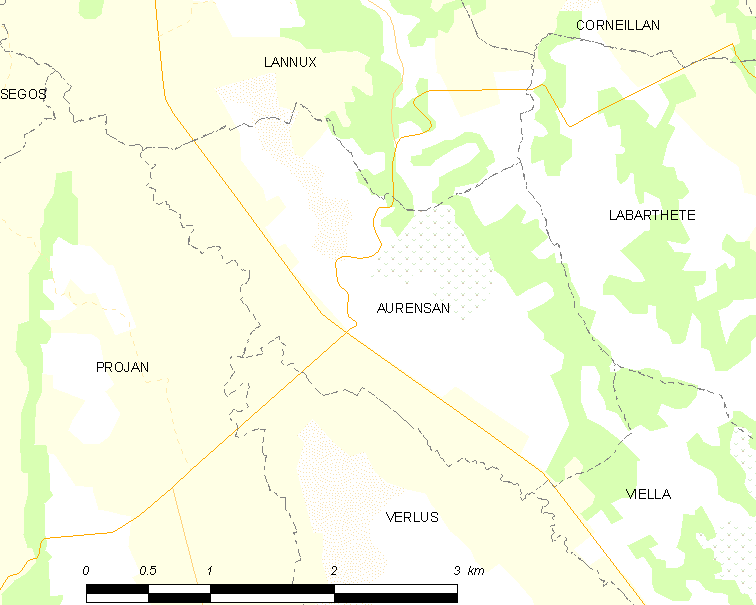
Aurensan and its surrounding communes

The commune of Aurensan is located to the west of the canton of Adour-Gersoise in the arrondissement of Mirande, 15 km from Riscle, 60 km from Mirande and 88 km from Auch.

The neighboring communes are Labarthète, Lannux, Projan, Verlus and Viella.

=== Geology and relief ===
The commune's altitude varies between 94 and 228 meters.

Aurensan is located in seismic zone 2 (low seismicity).

=== Hydrography ===
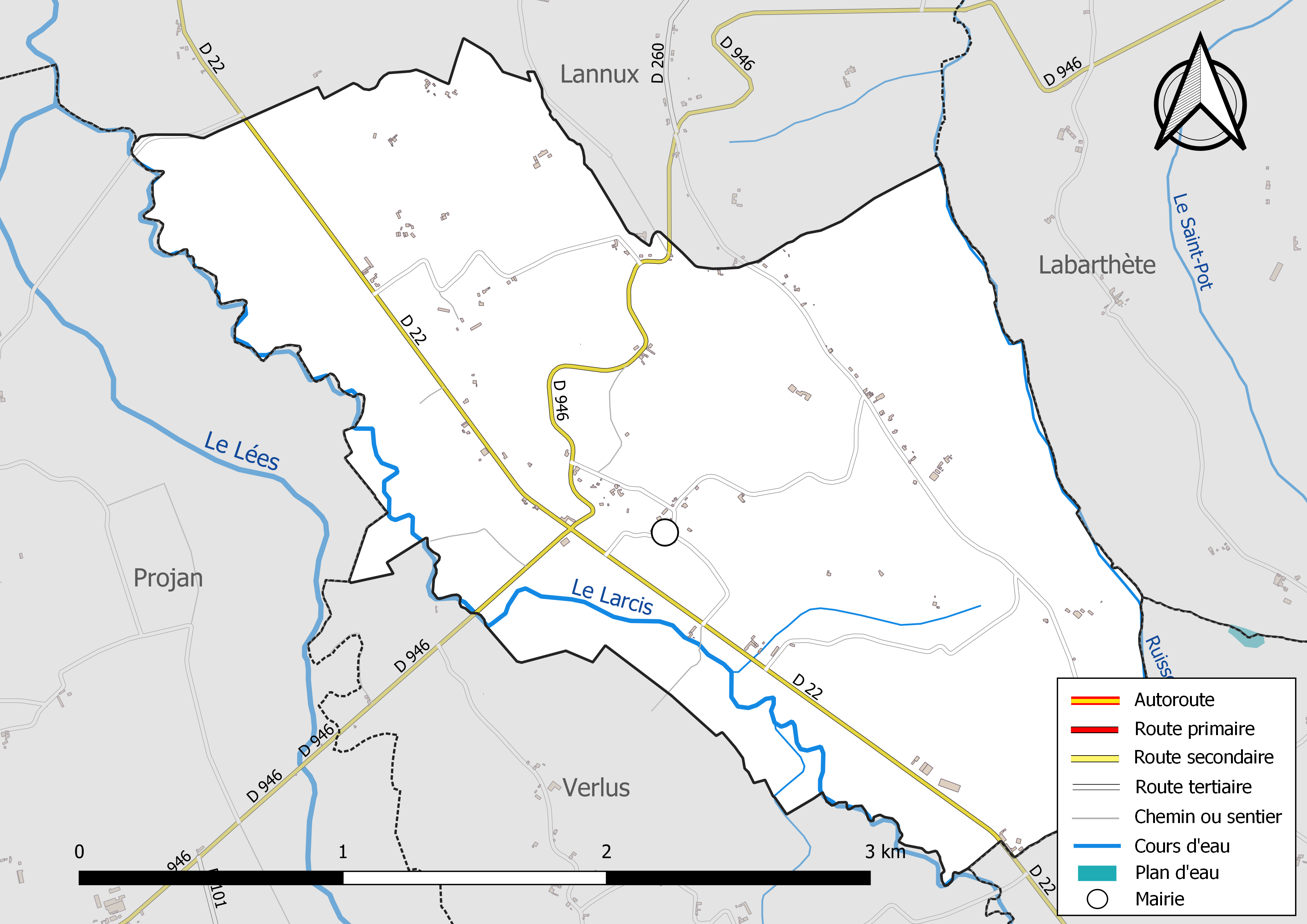
Hydrographic and road network of Aurensan.

The commune is located in the Adour basin, within the Adour-Garonne river basin. It is drained by the Larcis and the Claquessot stream, as well as by two smaller watercourses, which together form a 7 km long drainage network.

The Larcis, with a total length of 34.8 km, rises in the commune of Luc-Armau and flows northwest. It crosses the commune and empties into the Lées at Projan, after flowing through 20 communes.

=== Climate ===
Several studies have been conducted to characterize the climatic types to which the national territory is exposed. The resulting zoning varies depending on the methods used, the nature and number of parameters considered, the territorial coverage of the data, and the reference period. In 2010, the commune's climate was classified as an altered Mediterranean climate, according to a study by the French National Centre for Scientific Research (CNRS) based on a method combining climatic data and environmental factors (topography, land use, etc.) and data covering the period 1971-2000. In 2020, the predominant climate was classified as Cfb, according to the Köppen-Geiger classification, for the period 1988-2017, namely a temperate climate with cool summers and no dry season. Furthermore, in 2020, Météo-France published a new climate typology for metropolitan France, in which the municipality is located in a transition zone between oceanic and modified oceanic climates. It falls within the Aquitaine-Gascogne climate region, characterized by abundant rainfall in spring, moderate rainfall in autumn, low sunshine in spring, hot summers (19.5 °C), weak winds, frequent fog in autumn and winter, and frequent thunderstorms in summer (15 to 20 days). It is also located in zone H2c under the 2020 environmental regulations for new construction.

For the period 1971-2000, the average annual temperature was 13.1 °C, with an annual temperature range of 15.2 °C. The average annual rainfall was 1,083 mm, with 11.8 days of precipitation in January and 7.4 days in July. For the period 1991-2020, the average annual temperature observed at the nearest Météo-France weather station, located in the commune of Maumusson-Laguian 9 km away as the crow flies, was 14.1 °C, and the average annual rainfall was 1,021.5 mm. The maximum temperature recorded at this station was 41.5 °C, reached on 26 August 2010; the minimum temperature was −17.5 °C, reached on 8 January 1985.

=== Natural environments and biodiversity ===
No natural areas of heritage interest are listed in the commune in the national inventory of natural heritage.

== Urban planning ==
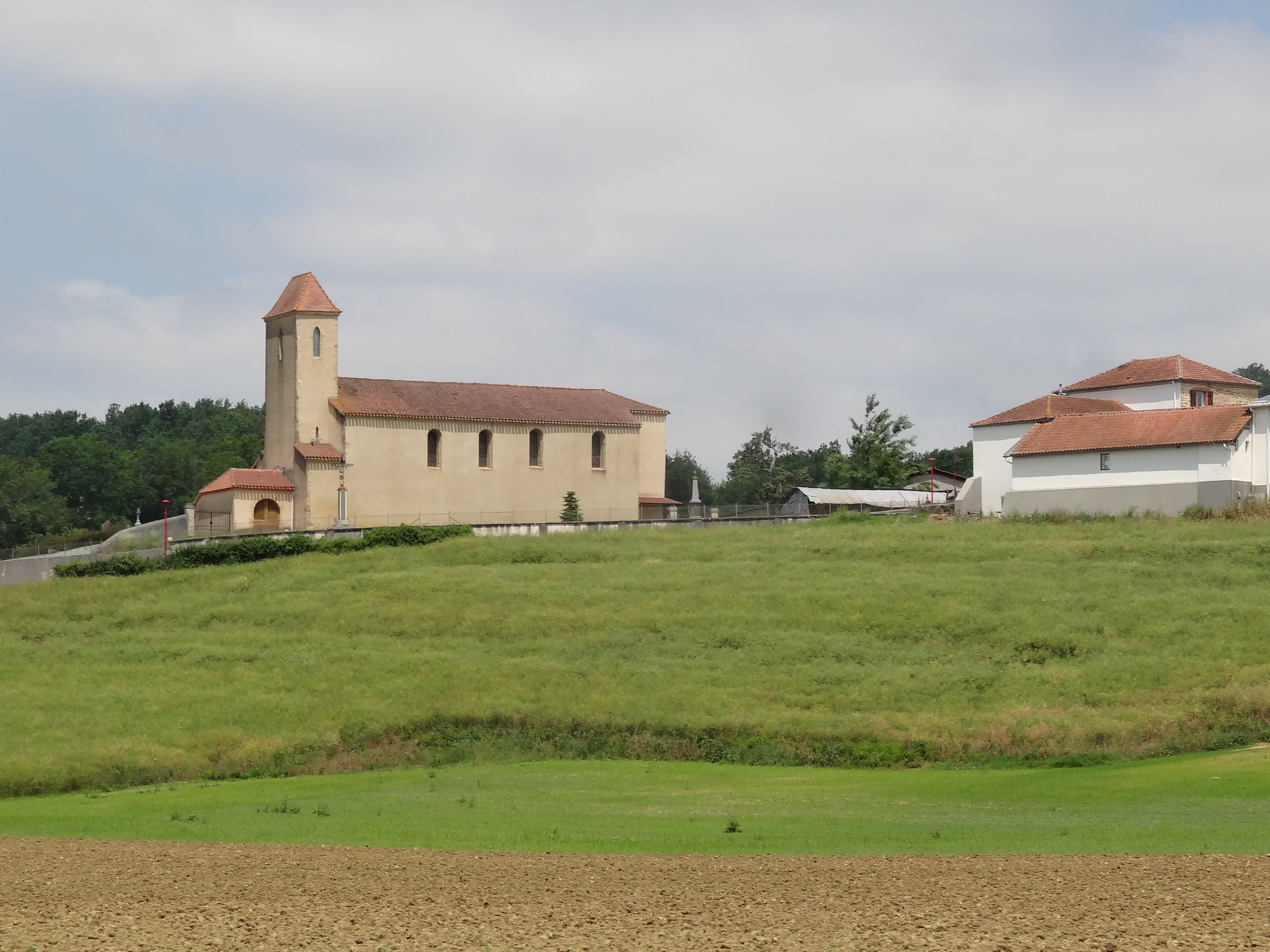
The commune is situated in a rural setting.

=== Typology ===
As of 1 January 2024, Aurensan is categorized as a rural commune with very dispersed housing, according to the new seven-level municipal population density scale defined by INSEE in 2022. It is located outside an urban area. Furthermore, the commune is part of the Aire-sur-l'Adour catchment area, of which it is a peripheral commune. This area, which includes 23 communes, is categorized as having fewer than 50,000 inhabitants.

=== Land use ===
Land cover in the commune, as shown in the European biophysical land cover database Corine Land Cover (CLC), is characterized by a significant amount of agricultural land (84.3% in 2018), a proportion identical to that of 1990 (84.3%). The detailed breakdown in 2018 is as follows: grasslands (33.6%), arable land (30%), forests (15.7%), heterogeneous agricultural areas (11.4%), and permanent crops (9.3%). Changes in land cover and infrastructure within the commune can be observed on various maps of the territory: the Cassini map (18th century), the General Staff map (1820-1866), and IGN maps and aerial photographs for the current period (1950 to the present).

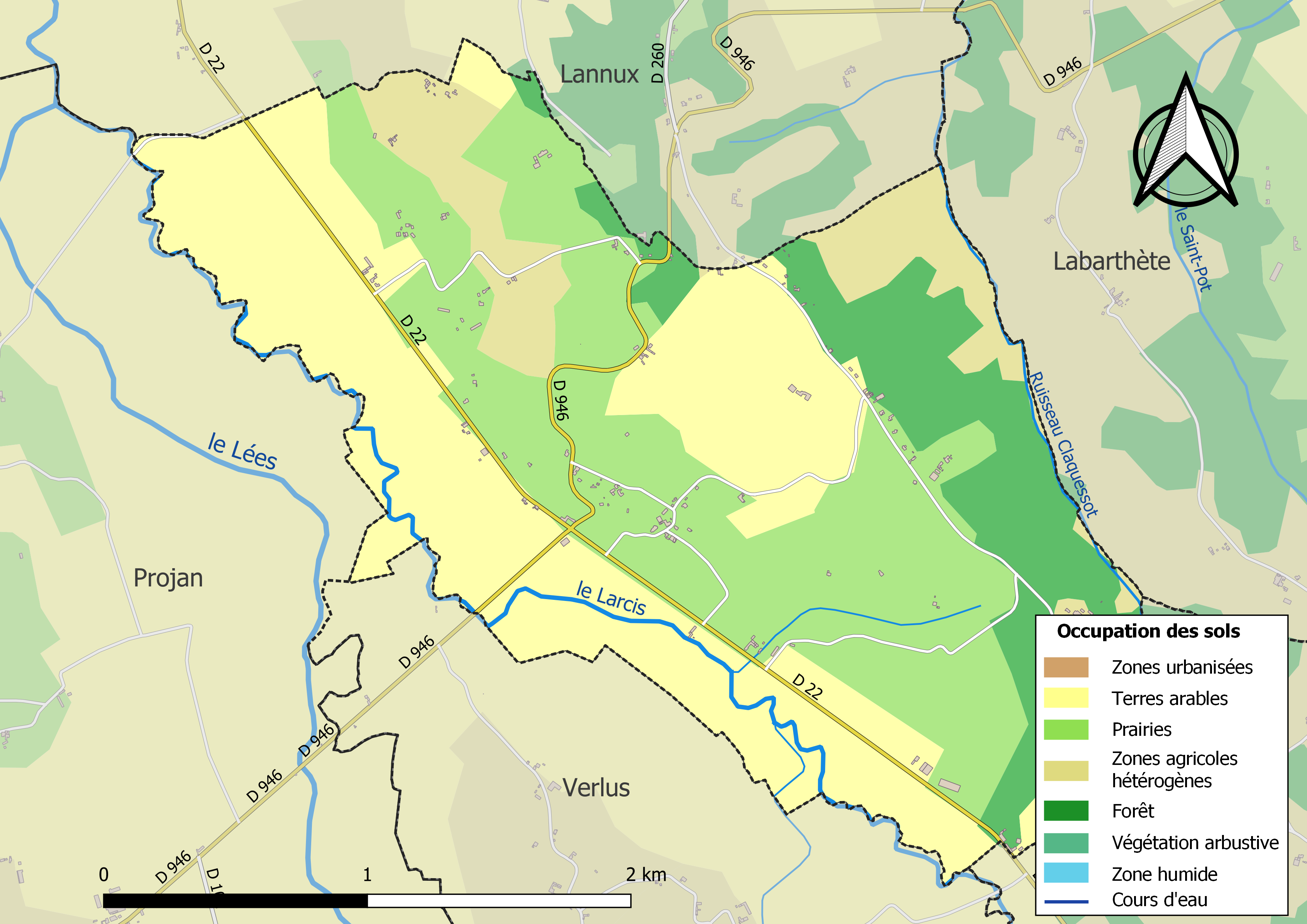
Map of the land use and infrastructure in Aurensan

=== Communication routes and transport ===
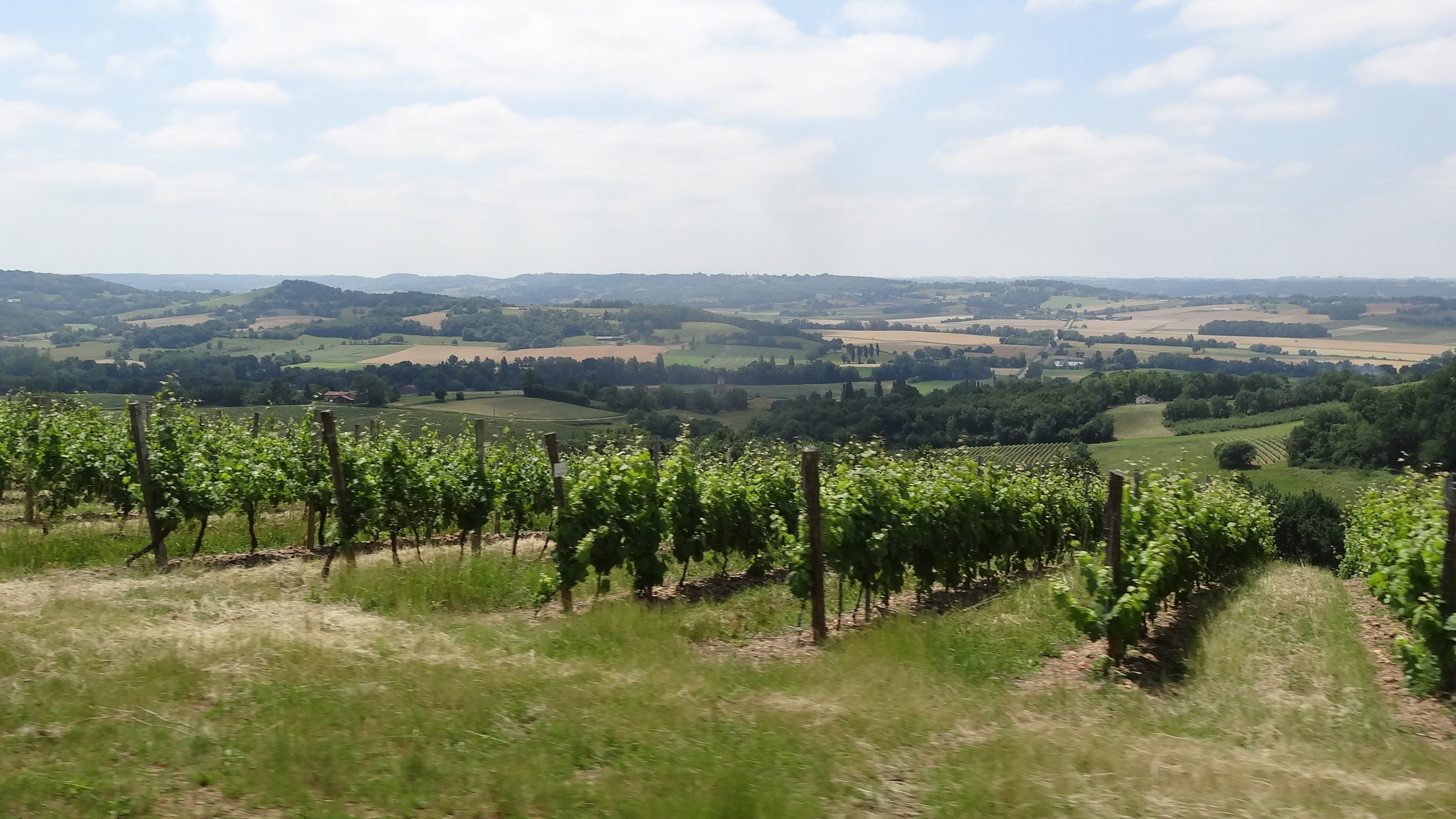
Viewpoint from the ridge road.

The village has a ridge road extending from Viella with a panoramic view.

=== Major risks ===
The territory of the commune of Aurensan is vulnerable to various natural hazards: weather-related events (storms, thunderstorms, snow, extreme cold, heat waves, or drought) and earthquakes (low seismicity). It is also exposed to a particular risk: the risk of radon. A website published by the BRGM (French Geological Survey) allows for a simple and quick assessment of the risks associated with a property, located either by its address or by its plot number.

==== Natural risks ====
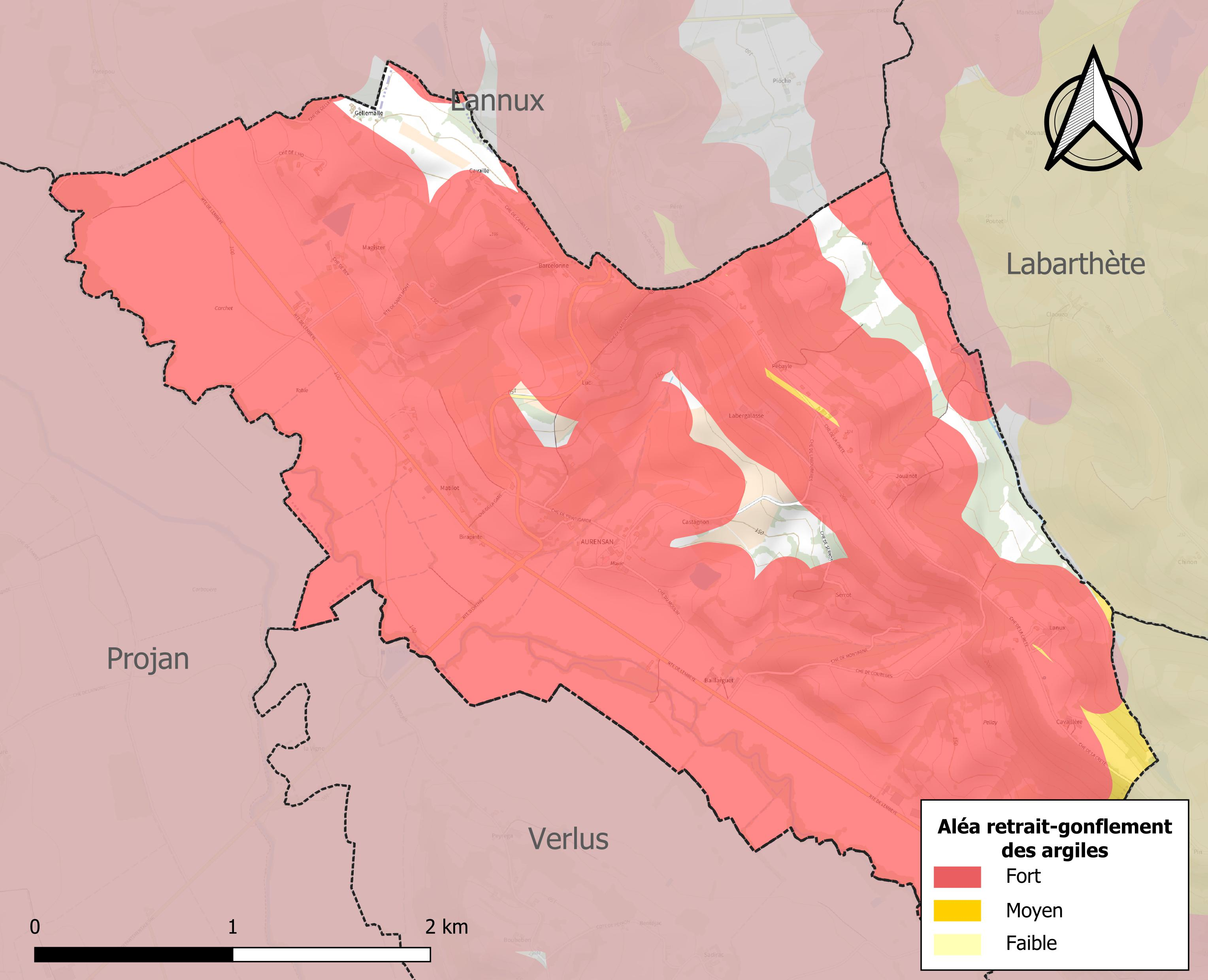
Map of the shrink-swell hazard zones of clay soils in Aurensan.

The shrinking and swelling of clay soils can cause significant damage to buildings in the event of alternating periods of drought and rain. 92.6% of the municipality's area is at medium or high risk (94.5% at the departmental level and 48.5% at the national level). Of the 71 buildings surveyed in the municipality in 2019, 70 are at medium or high risk, representing 99%, compared to 93% at the departmental level and 54% at the national level. A map of the national territory's exposure to clay soil shrinking and swelling is available on the BRGM website.

Furthermore, to better understand the risk of ground subsidence, the national inventory of underground cavities allows for the identification of those located within the commune.

Aurensan has been recognized as being in a state of natural disaster due to the damage caused by floods and mudslides that occurred in 1999, 2007 and 2009. Regarding landslides, the commune has been recognized as being in a state of natural disaster due to the damage caused by drought in 1989, 1991 and 2017 and by landslides in 1999.

==== Specific risk ====
In several parts of the country, radon, which accumulates in some homes and other buildings, can be a significant source of exposure to ionizing radiation. Some communes in the department are affected by radon risk to varying degrees. According to the 2018 classification, the commjne of Aurensan is classified as zone 2, meaning an area with low radon potential, but where specific geological factors can facilitate the transfer of radon into buildings.

== Name ==
The name of the commune comes from the Latin Aurientasus, meaning the domain of Aurensan.

== Services and society ==
=== Education ===
There is no longer a school in Aurensan.

=== Cultural events and festivities ===
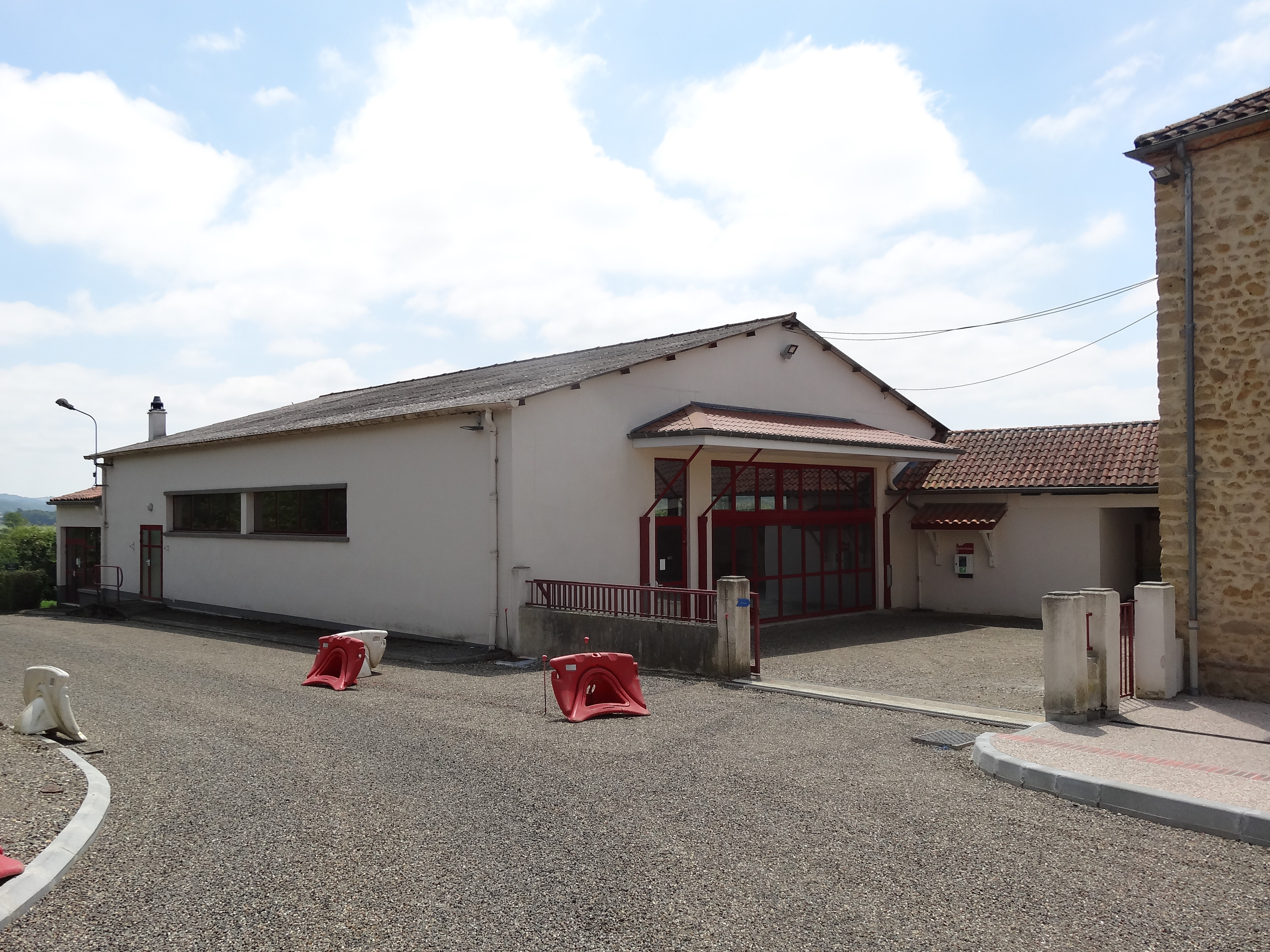
The function room

Festival: second Sunday of June.

== Economy ==
=== Activities outside of agriculture ===
As of 31 December 2019, 10 establishments were located in Aurensan. The construction sector is predominant in the commune, representing 40% of the total number of establishments in the commune (4 out of the 10 companies located in Aurensan), compared to 14.6% at the departmental level.

=== Agriculture ===
The commune is located in the Rivière Basse, a small agricultural region occupying the western part of the Gers department. In 2020, the agricultural focus in the commune was mixed farming and/or livestock production. Seven farms headquartered in the commune were counted in the 2020 agricultural census (26 in 1988). The utilized agricultural area is 578 hectares.

=== Businesses and shops ===
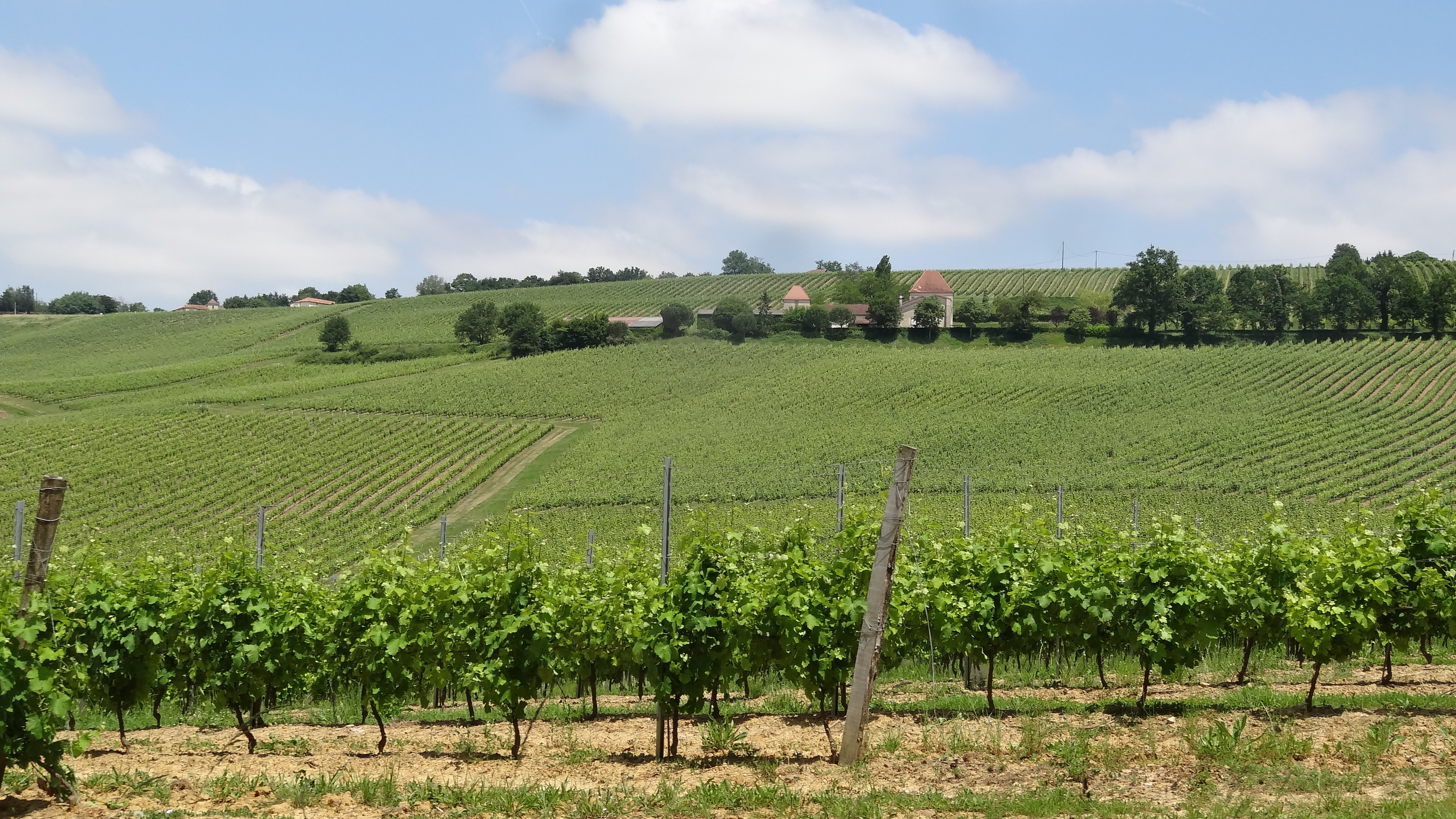
A hillside covered in vines that encompass an estate

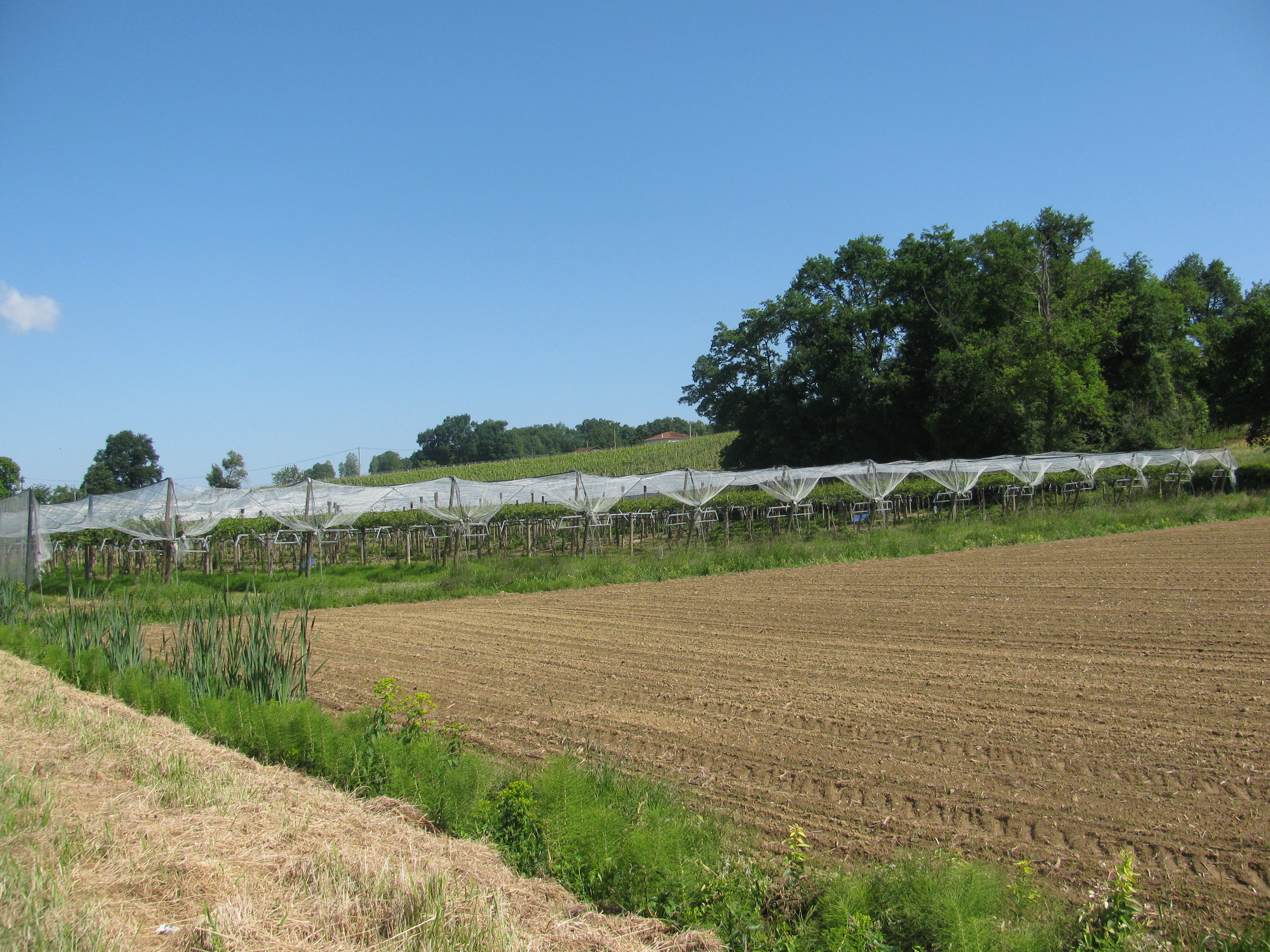
Kiwis from the Adour region in Aurensan

==== Thermalism ====
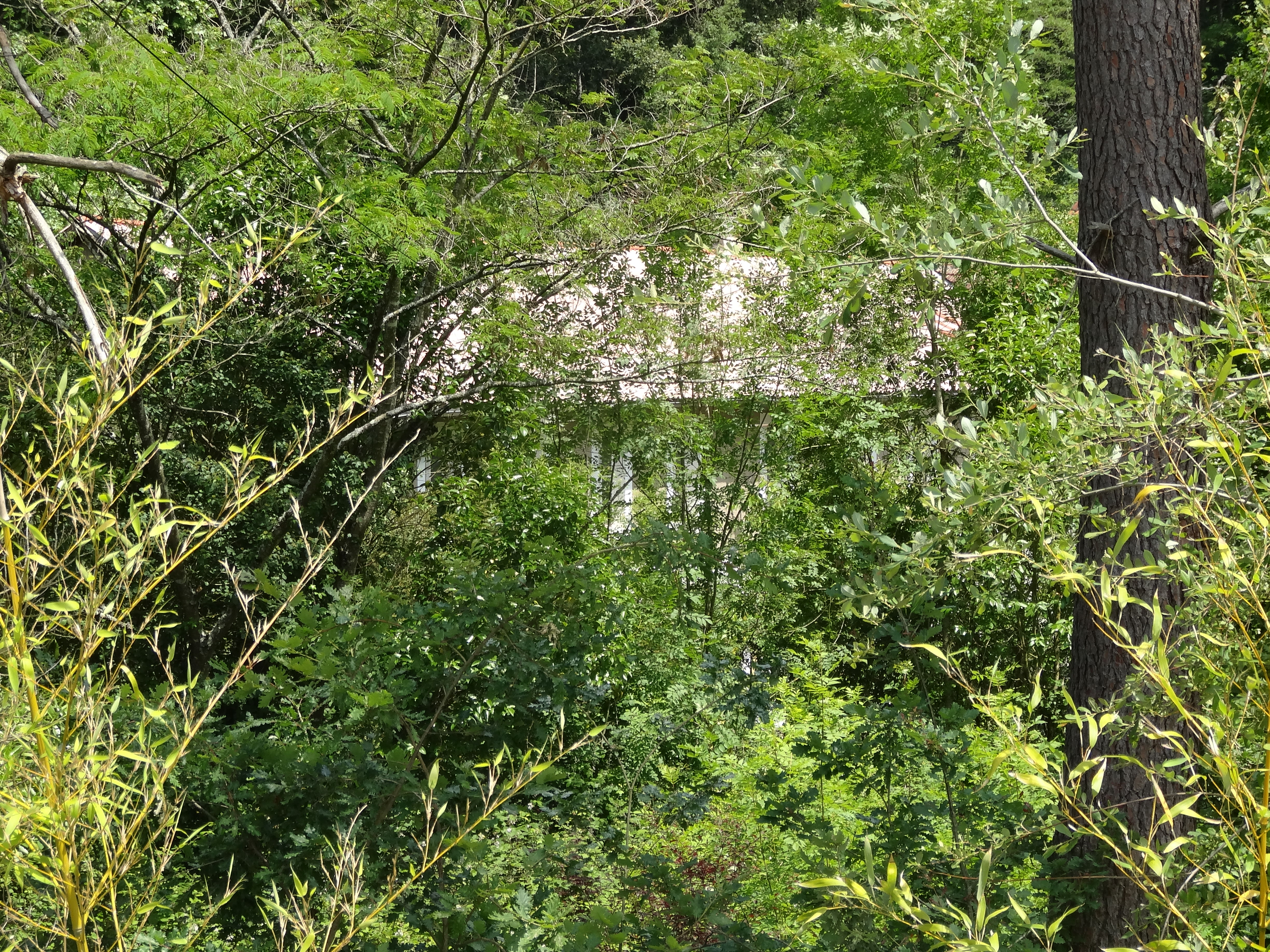
A glimpse of the abandoned thermal baths in 2020.

With activity declining (185 spa guests in 1995), the establishment was forced to close a few years ago.

These thermal baths were created by a local landowner, Monsieur de Laborde, in 1850 thanks to the harnessing of two ferruginous springs. They were believed to have properties that could help with sciatica, osteoarthritis, liver disorders, and urinary tract infections.

Minister Plenipotentiary Narbonne had a tramway installed in Aurensan.

It was the third spa town in the Gers department, after Castéra-Verduzan and Barbotan-les-Thermes.

== Heraldry ==
Arms of Aurensan	Quarterly: 1st Or, a monumental fountain proper, masoned Sable and spouting three jets of water Azure; 2nd Gules, the church of the place proper in perspective, open and pierced Or; 3rd Gules, a cross clechée, voided and pommée of twelve pieces Or; 4th Or, a bunch of grapes Purpure, stalked and leaved proper.

== Population ==
Historical population
Year	Pop.	±% p.a.
1968	170	—
1975	171	+0.08%
1982	167	−0.34%
1990	136	−2.53%
1999	129	−0.59%
2007	128	−0.10%
2012	135	+1.07%
2017	134	−0.15%
2023	131	−0.38%
Source: INSEE

== See also ==
- Communes of the Gers department
