= Aurensan =

Aurensan is the name of the following communes in France:

- Aurensan, Gers, in the Gers department
- Aurensan, Hautes-Pyrénées, in the Hautes-Pyrénées department
