= Château de Saint-Béat =

Ruined castle in Occitania, France

Coordinates: 42.9164°N 0.6921°E

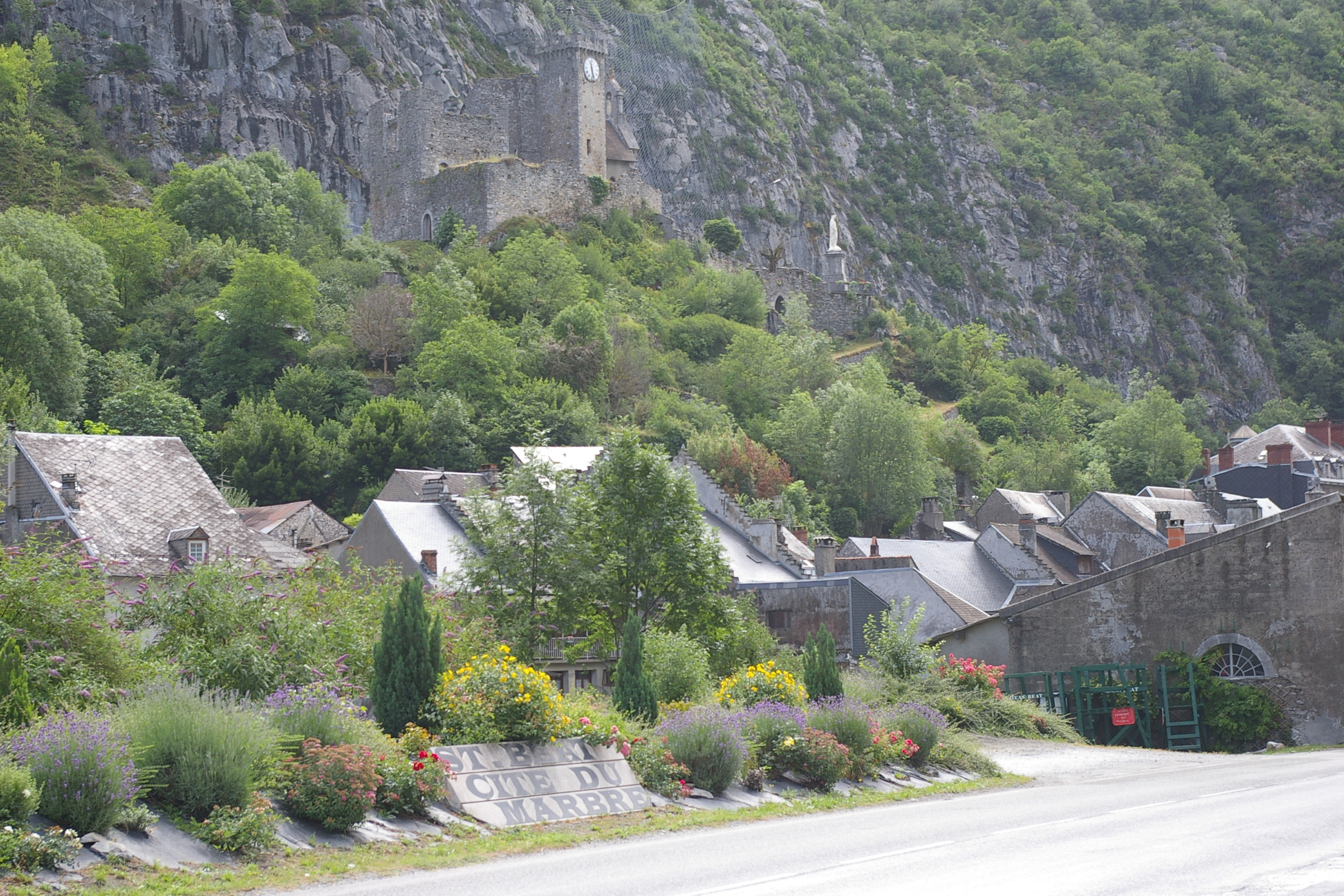
Château de Saint-Béat overlooking the village of Saint-Béat

The Château de Saint-Béat is a ruined castle in the commune of Saint-Béat-Lez in the Haute-Garonne département of France.

== History ==
The castle dates from the 12th century. It was enlarged by Henri IV (1553 – 1610). Rulers rarely lived in Saint-Béat; the castle was occupied by captains until the 16th century. In 1588, the Parlement of Toulouse passed a law that required the inhabitants of Melles, Argut and Arlos by turns to guard the castle, subject to a fine of 500 écus. The castle never had to repel invasions, though its strategic position close to the Spanish border led to it being described as "la clef de France" (the key to France).

== Description ==
The castle was surrounded by two enceintes. The keep measures 5 metres by 5 and had two storeys. The castle provides views over the village and the Garonne valley.

== See also ==
- List of castles in France
