= Saint-Béat =

Commune in Haute-Garonne, France

- Part of Saint-Béat-Lez
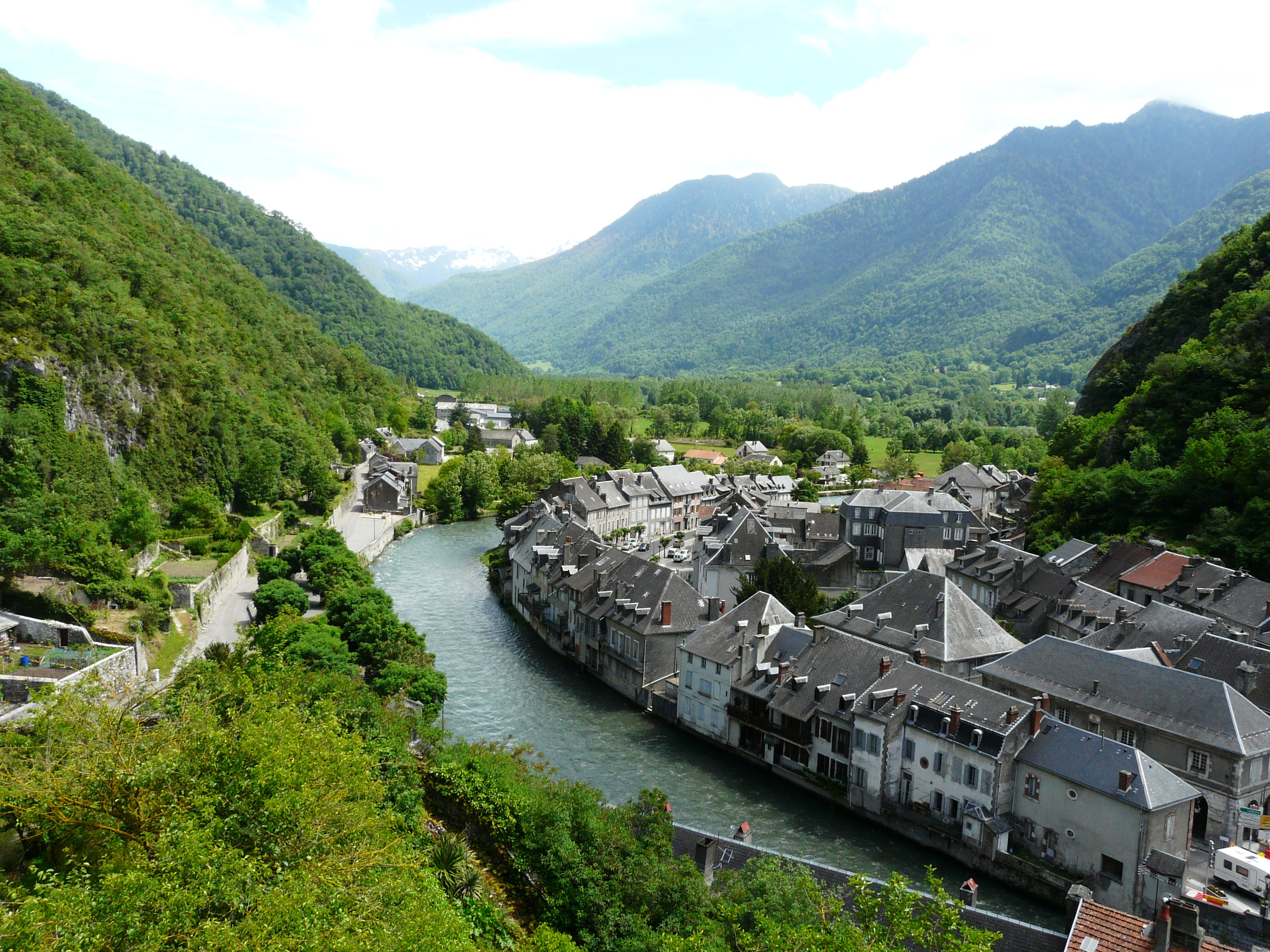
- The Garonne river and the village of Saint-Béat

- Coat of arms
- Location of Saint-Béat
- Location within France Location within Occitanie
- Coordinates: 42°54′54″N 0°41′36″E
- Country: France
- Region: Occitania
- Department: Haute-Garonne
- Arrondissement: Saint-Gaudens
- Canton: Bagnères-de-Luchon
- Commune: Saint-Béat-Lez
- Area^{1}: 7.37 km^{2} (2.85 sq mi)
- Elevation: 500 m (1,600 ft)
- Highest elevation: 1,760 m (5,770 ft)
- Lowest elevation: 476 m (1,562 ft)
- Population (2016): 345
  - Density: 46.8/km^{2} (121/sq mi)
- Time zone: UTC+01:00 (CET)
  - Summer (DST): UTC+02:00 (CEST)
- Postal code: 31440
- ^{1} French Land Register data, which excludes lakes, ponds, glaciers > 1 km^{2} (0.386 sq mi or 247 acres) and river estuaries.

Saint-Béat (French pronunciation: [sɛ̃ bea]; Gascon: Sent Biat) is a former commune in the Haute-Garonne department in southwestern France. On 1 January 2019, it was merged into the new commune Saint-Béat-Lez.

== Sites and monuments ==
- Château de Saint-Béat, 12th century castle
- The Pic du Gar is a striking limestone mountain in the area.

== Marble quarries ==
Saint-Béat is renowned for its marble quarries, which have been in operation since Roman times. Although quarrying activity is now reduced, various marbles were or are still extracted from the municipality:

- The statuary white, or bluish-white, is the most prestigious marble from the municipality. For instance, it has been used to adorn the Palace of Versailles and the Grand Trianon. Its white or light gray color makes it a marble suitable for substituting Carrara marble, even though its coarser grain makes it harder and more challenging to sculpt.
- Blue Turquin marble: it is a bluish-gray marble that can range up to dark gray.
- The surroundings of Saint-Béat also host quarries with marbles of various colors: the black from Loures-Barousse, the yellow from Bagiry, the red from Cierp, as well as green and white from Lez...

Every year, a sculpture and marble festival takes place in July in Saint-Béat. It welcomes sculptors, including some internationally renowned artists, who have three weeks to create a piece using blocks of local marble. The festival also offers workshops for those interested in learning the art of sculpture.

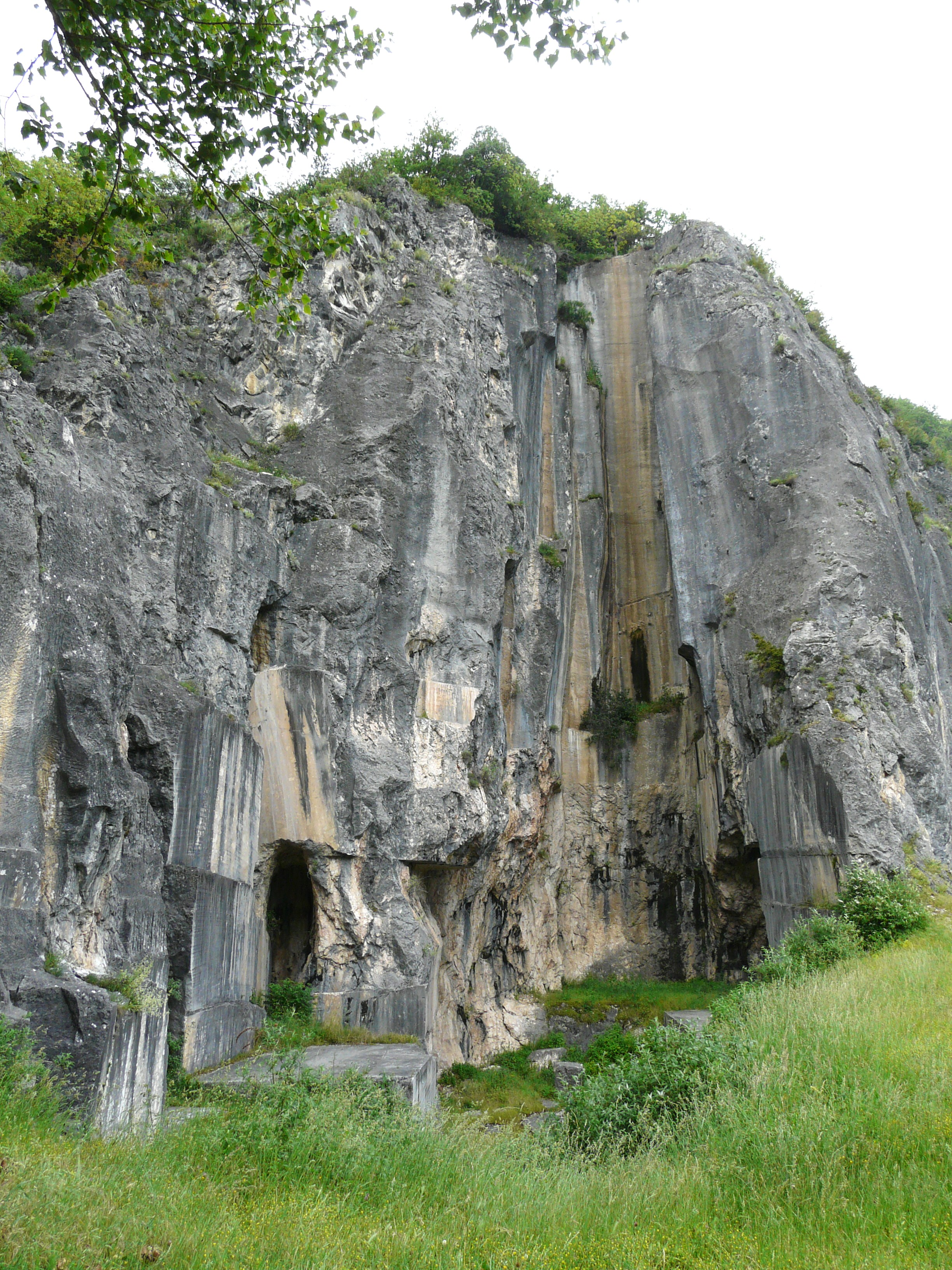
Roman breccia

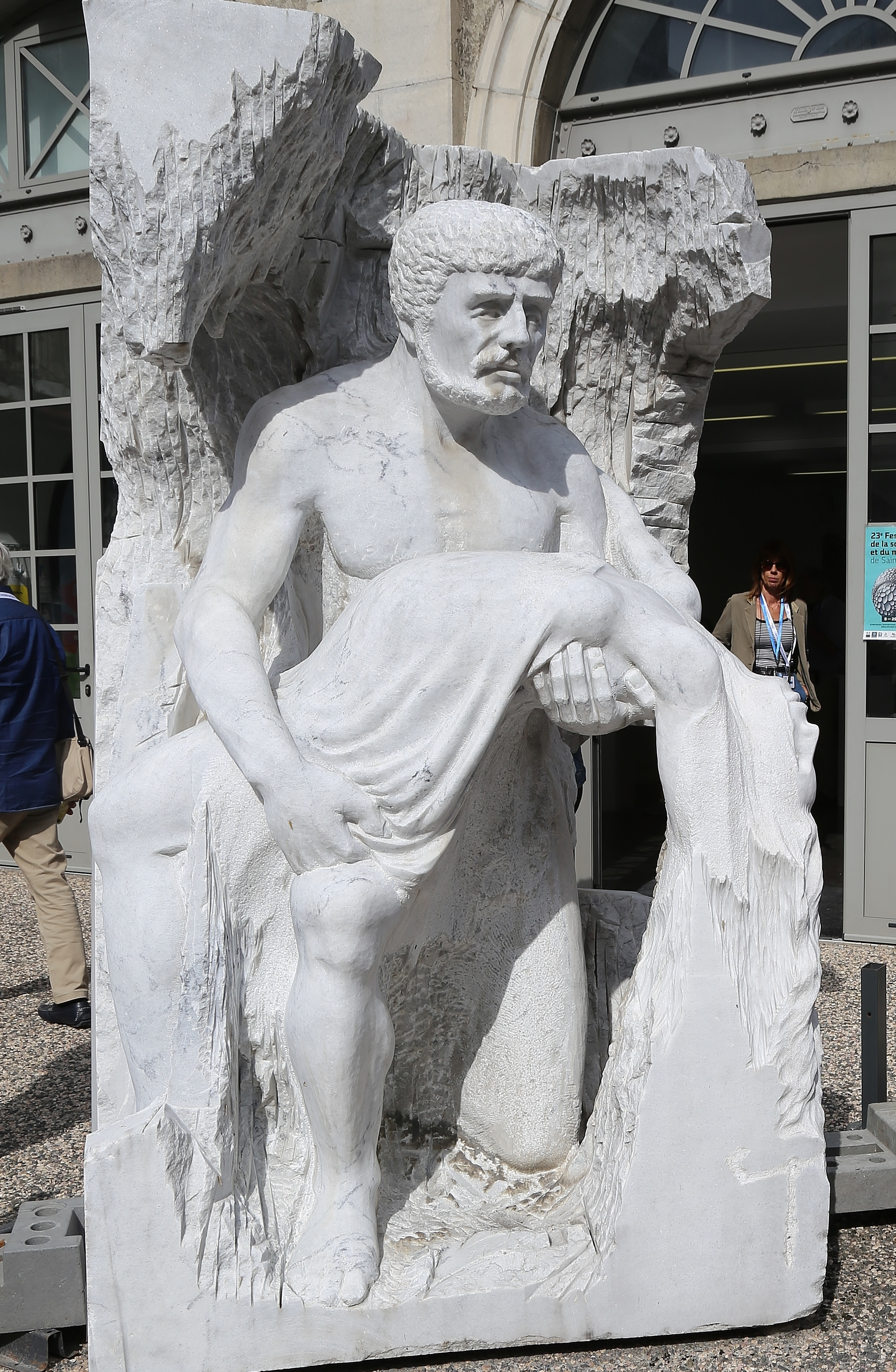
White statuary marble

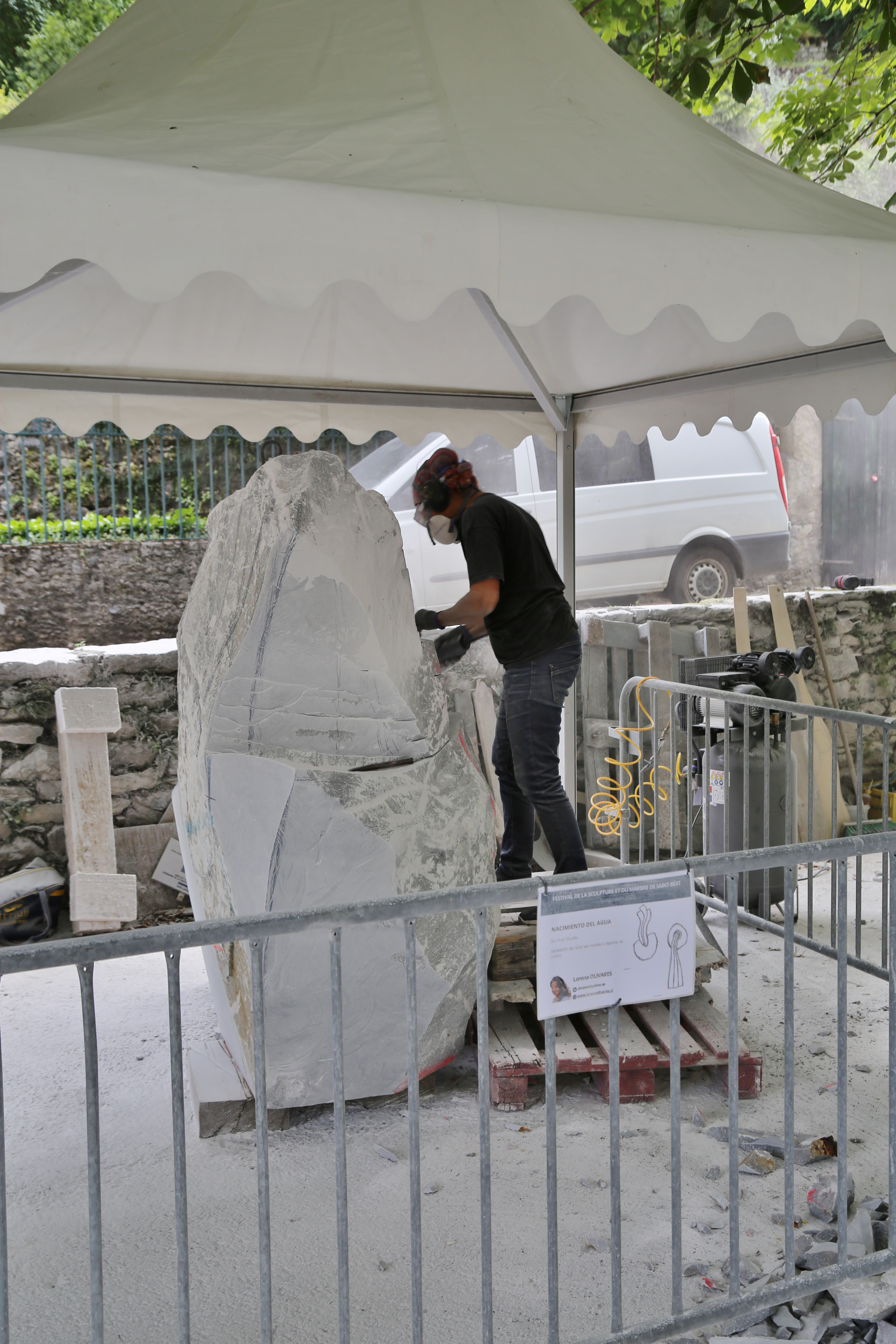
Work in progress at sculpture and marble Festival 2023

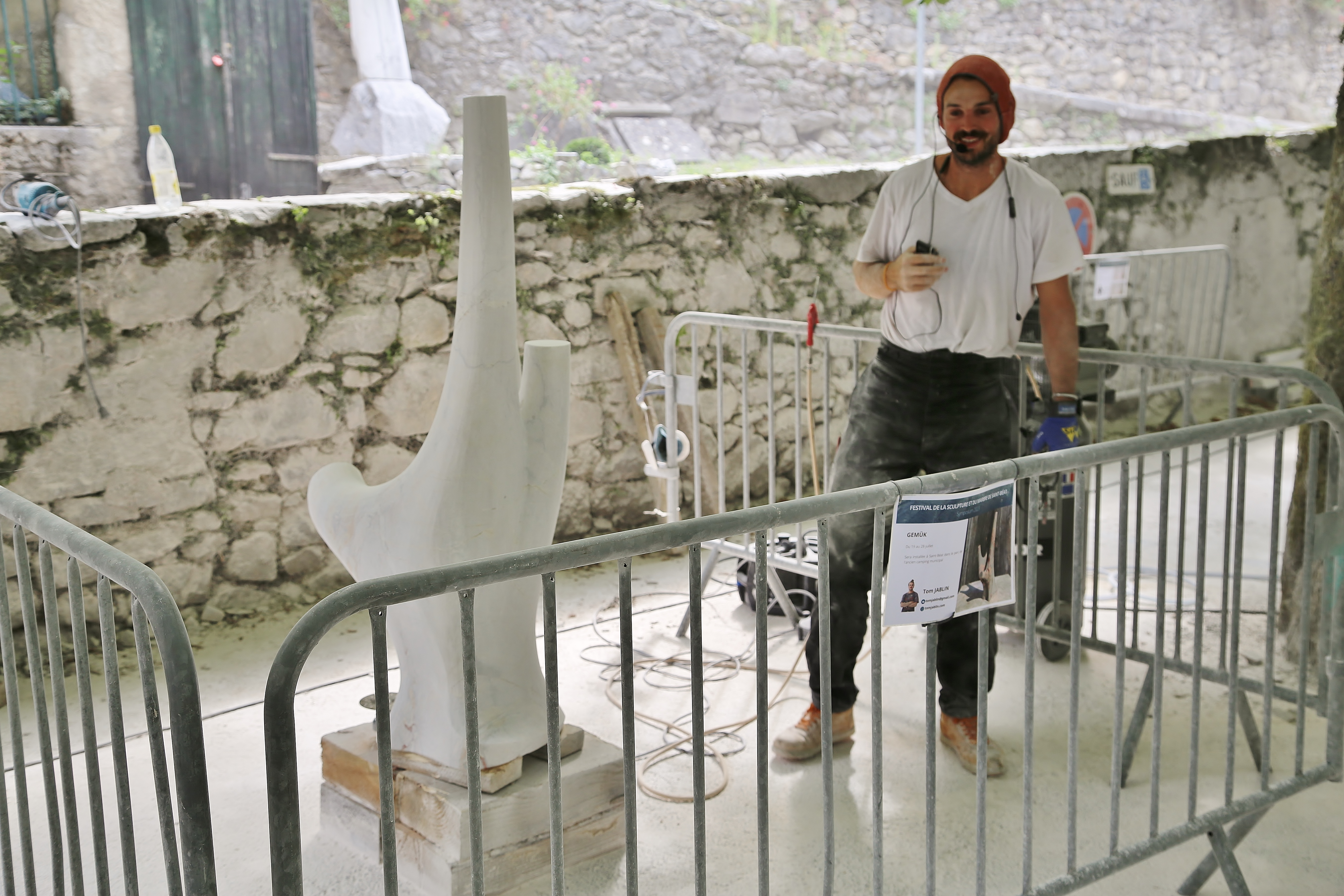
Sculpture and marble Festival 2023

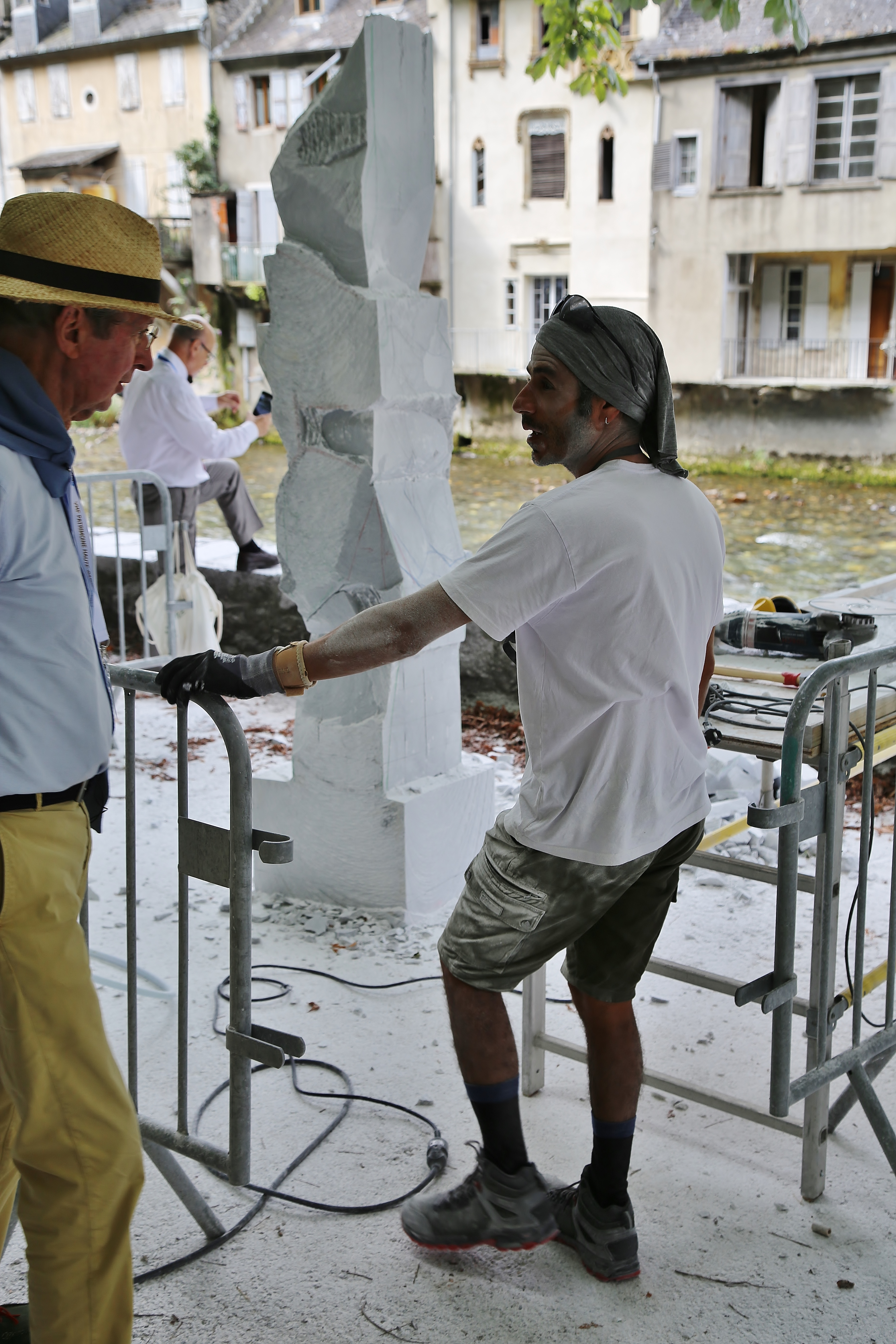
Sculpture and marble Festival 2023

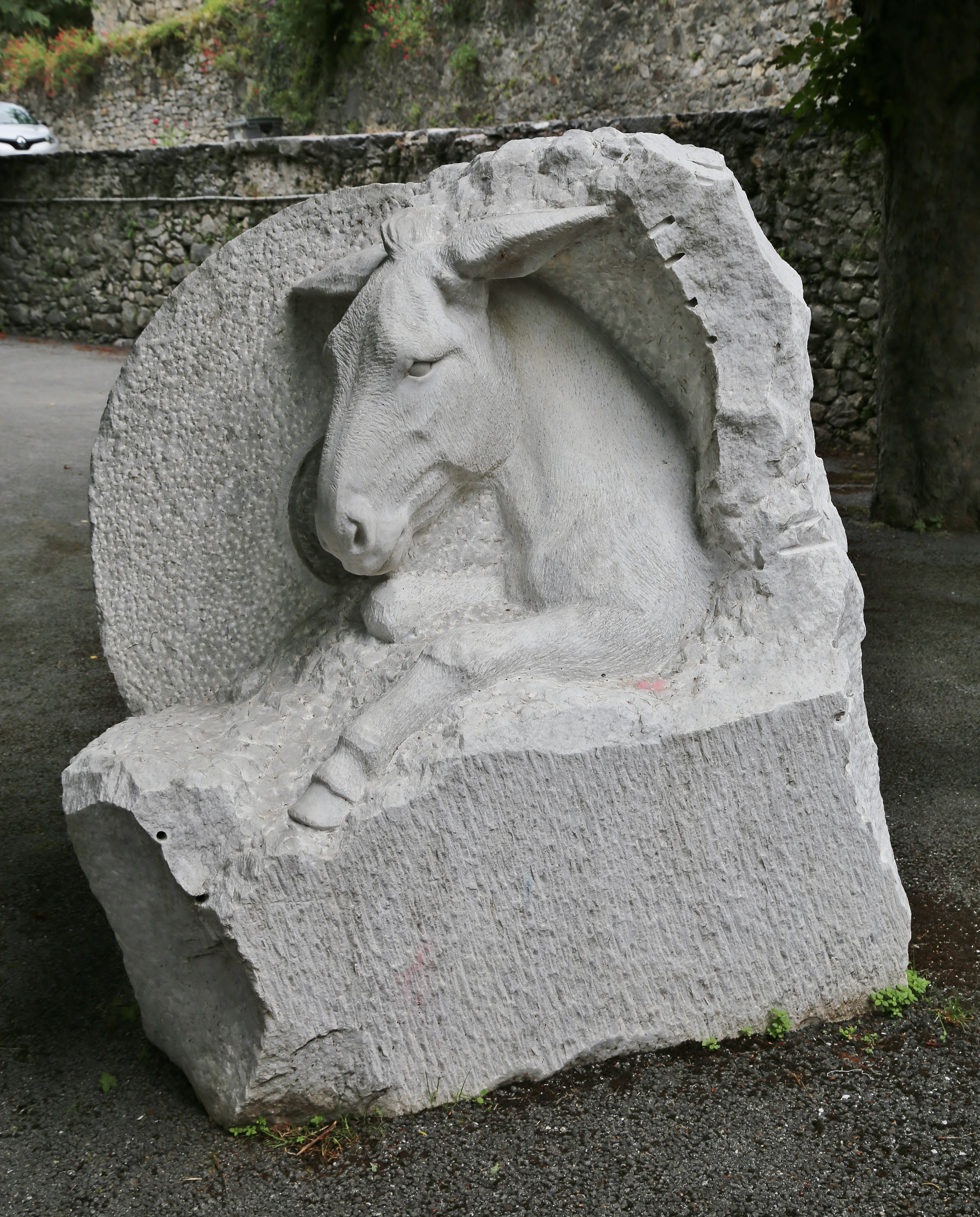
Winner of a previous sculpture and marble festival, exhibited near the Garonne river

== Population ==
Historical population
Year	Pop.	±% p.a.
1962	687	—
1968	755	+1.59%
1975	611	−2.98%
1982	543	−1.67%
1990	547	+0.09%
1999	364	−4.42%
2016	345	−0.31%
Source: EHESS and INSEE

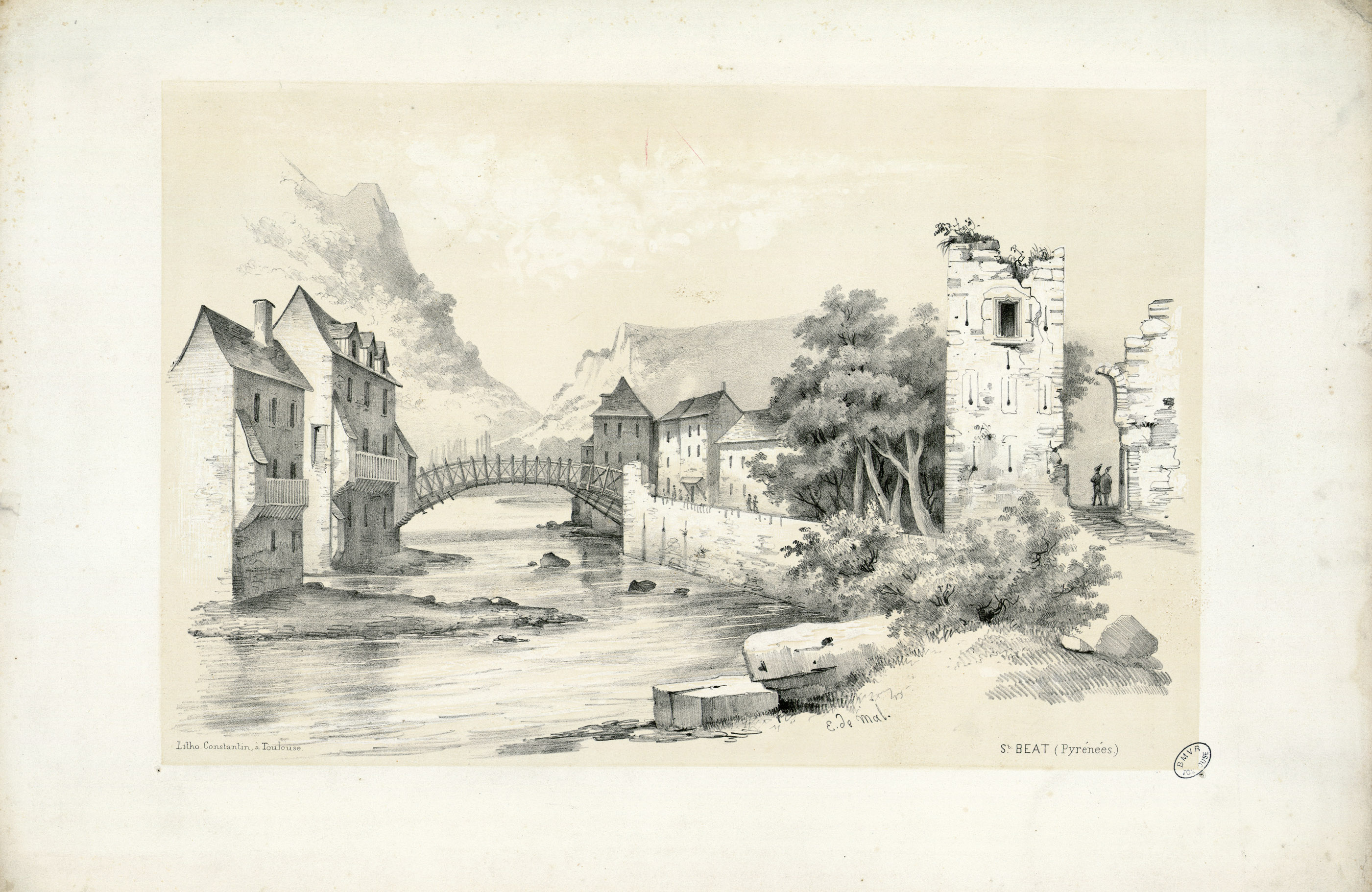
Saint-Béat by Eugène de Malbos, near 1840.

== See also ==
- Communes of the Haute-Garonne department
