= Luc-Armau =

- Commune
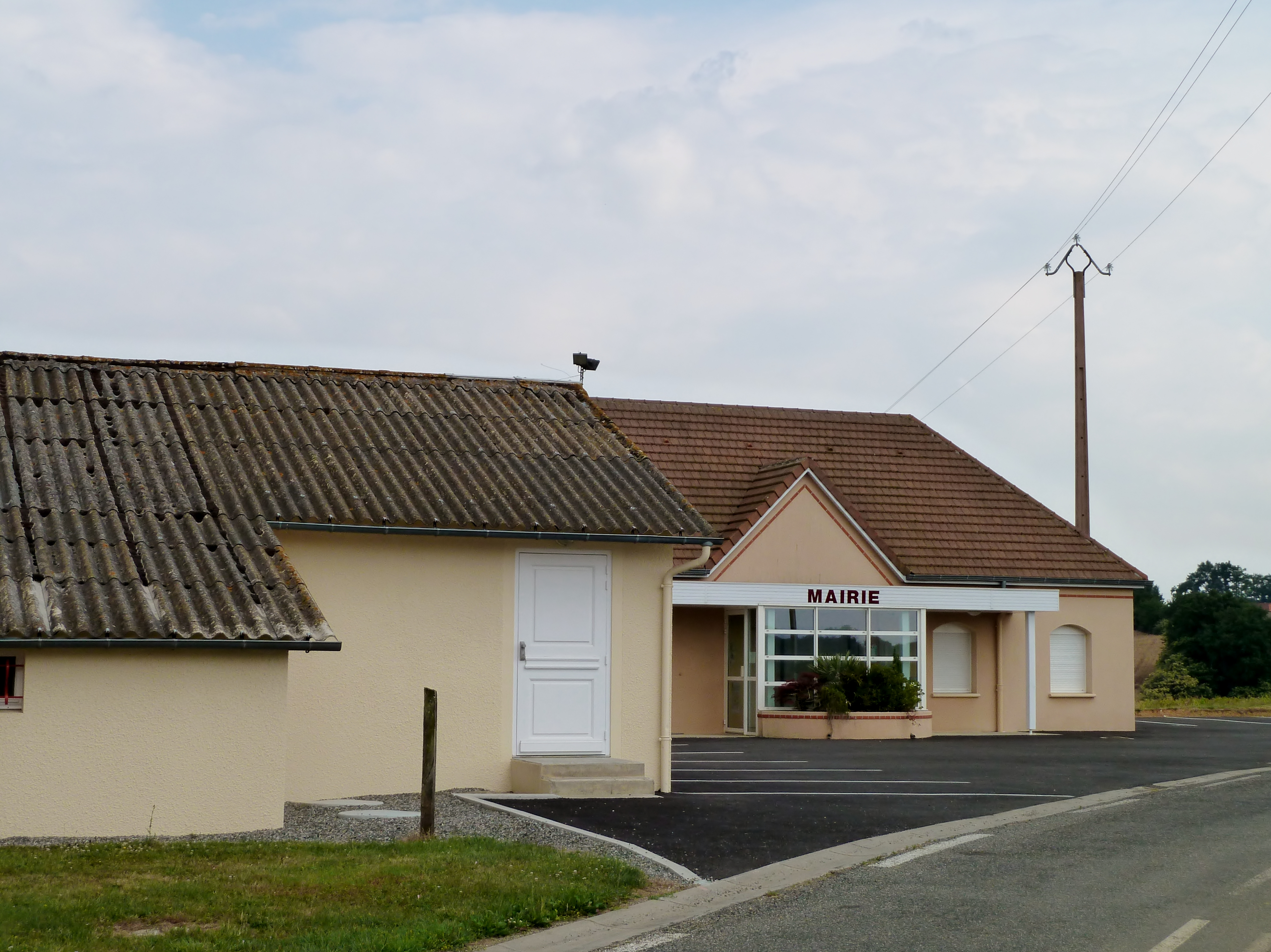
- The town hall of Luc-Armau
- Location of Luc-Armau
- Location within France Location within Nouvelle-Aquitaine
- Coordinates: 43°25′20″N 0°03′56″W
- Country: France
- Region: Nouvelle-Aquitaine
- Department: Pyrénées-Atlantiques
- Arrondissement: Pau
- Canton: Terres des Luys et Coteaux du Vic-Bilh
- Intercommunality: Nord-Est Béarn

Government
  - Mayor (2020–2026): Isabelle Montauban
- Area^{1}: 5.85 km^{2} (2.26 sq mi)
- Elevation: 300 m (980 ft)
- Highest elevation: 324 m (1,063 ft)
- Lowest elevation: 218 m (715 ft)
- Population (2023): 104
  - Density: 17.8/km^{2} (46.0/sq mi)
- Time zone: UTC+01:00 (CET)
  - Summer (DST): UTC+02:00 (CEST)
- INSEE/Postal code: 64356 /64350
- ^{1} French Land Register data, which excludes lakes, ponds, glaciers > 1 km^{2} (0.386 sq mi or 247 acres) and river estuaries.

Luc-Armau (French pronunciation: [lyk aʁmo]; Occitan: Lo Luc e Armau) is a commune in the Pyrénées-Atlantiques department in south-western France.

== See also ==
- Communes of the Pyrénées-Atlantiques department
