= Larcis =

Arcis Larcis
- Location within France Location within Nouvelle-Aquitaine

Location
- Country: France

Physical characteristics
- Source
  - location: Luc-Armau
- Mouth: Léez
  - coordinates: 43.6312°N 0.2325°W
- Length: 34.8 km (21.6 mi)

Basin features
- Progression: Léez→ Adour→ Atlantic Ocean

The Arcis or Larcis (with article agglutination; Occitan: Arsís) is a river in Southwestern France. It is a right tributary of the Léez, originating in the commune Luc-Armau in the east of the Pyrénées-Atlantiques. It joins the Léez in Lannux, in the French département of the Gers. It is 34.8 km (21.6 mi) long.

== Name ==
The name is documented as Arsiis (1540), Arciis (1542), Arcis (1863). The name of the Arcison, a left tributary of the Layon, is related.

== Main tributaries ==
- (L) Lizo,
- (L) Léès, from Saubole.
