= Lez, Haute-Garonne =

Lez
- Part of Saint-Béat-Lez
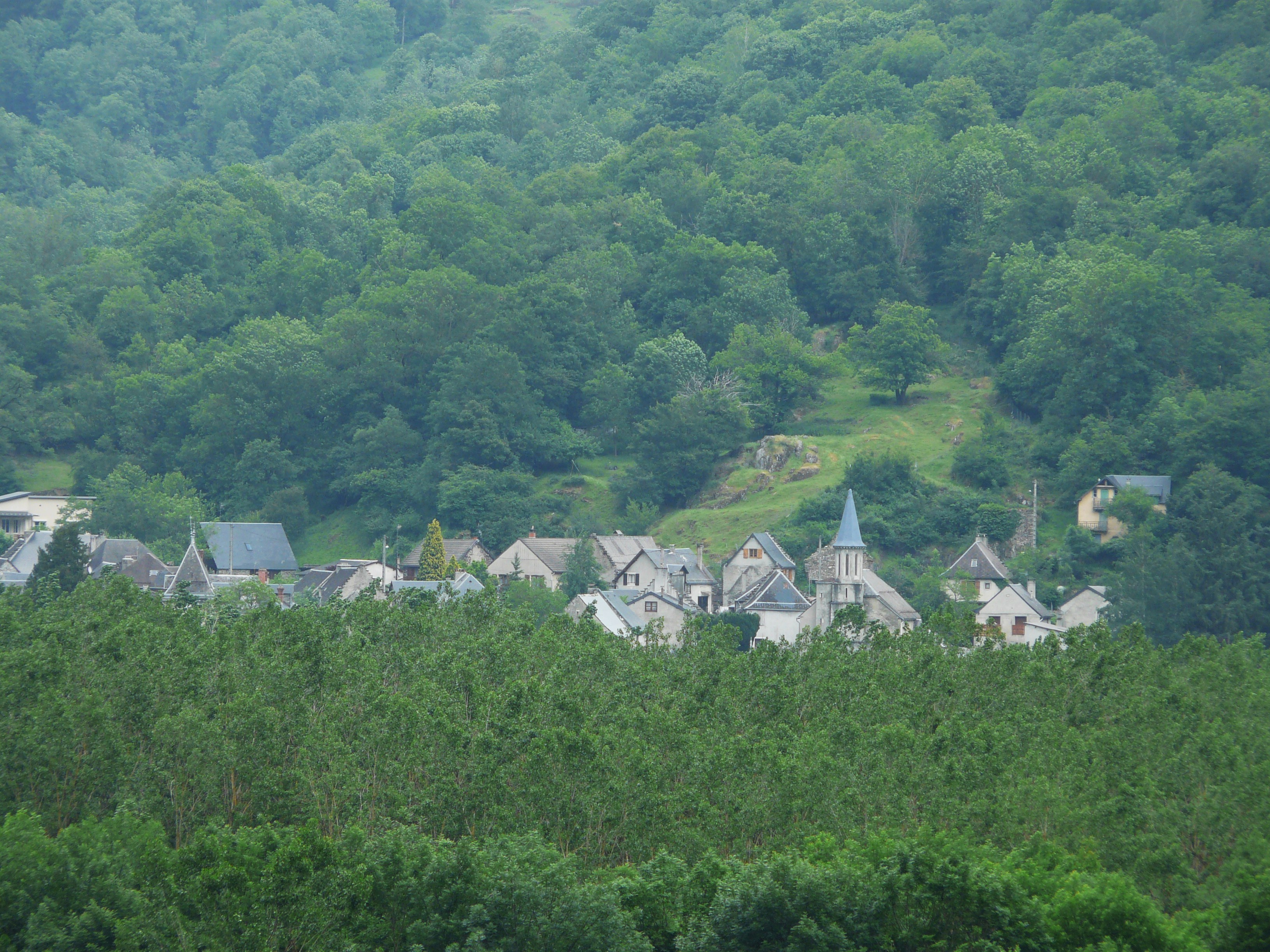
- Location of Lez
- Location within France Location within Occitanie
- Coordinates: 42°54′36″N 0°42′06″E
- Country: France
- Region: Occitania
- Department: Haute-Garonne
- Arrondissement: Saint-Gaudens
- Canton: Bagnères-de-Luchon
- Commune: Saint-Béat-Lez
- Area^{1}: 2.6 km^{2} (1.0 sq mi)
- Elevation: 505 m (1,657 ft)
- Highest elevation: 1,180 m (3,870 ft)
- Lowest elevation: 499 m (1,637 ft)
- Population (2023): 50
  - Density: 19/km^{2} (50/sq mi)
- Time zone: UTC+01:00 (CET)
  - Summer (DST): UTC+02:00 (CEST)
- Postal code: 31440
- ^{1} French Land Register data, which excludes lakes, ponds, glaciers > 1 km^{2} (0.386 sq mi or 247 acres) and river estuaries.

Lez (French pronunciation: [lɛz]; Gascon: Les) is a former commune in the Haute-Garonne department in southwestern France. On 1 January 2019, it was merged into the new commune Saint-Béat-Lez.

== See also ==
- Communes of the Haute-Garonne department
