= Saint-Béat-Lez =

- Commune
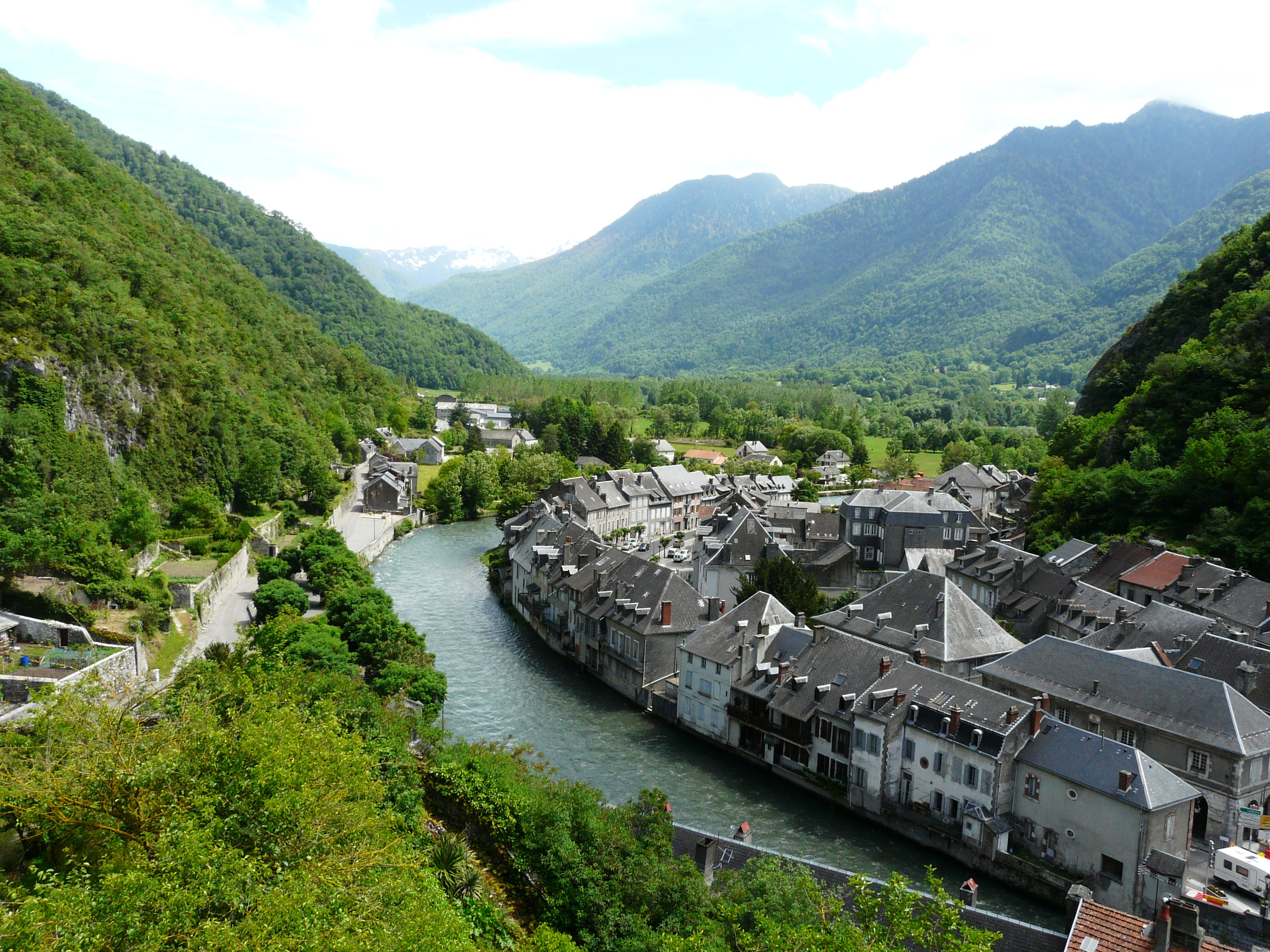
- The Garonne river and the village of Saint-Béat

- Coat of arms
- Location of Saint-Béat-Lez
- Location within France Location within Occitanie
- Coordinates: 42°54′52″N 0°41′33″E
- Country: France
- Region: Occitania
- Department: Haute-Garonne
- Arrondissement: Saint-Gaudens
- Canton: Bagnères-de-Luchon
- Intercommunality: Pyrénées Haut-Garonnaises

Government
  - Mayor (2026–32): Charlotte Perefarres
- Area^{1}: 9.96 km^{2} (3.85 sq mi)
- Elevation: 50,093 m (164,347 ft)
- Population (2023): 385
  - Density: 38.7/km^{2} (100/sq mi)
- Time zone: UTC+01:00 (CET)
  - Summer (DST): UTC+02:00 (CEST)
- INSEE/Postal code: 31471 /31440
- ^{1} French Land Register data, which excludes lakes, ponds, glaciers > 1 km^{2} (0.386 sq mi or 247 acres) and river estuaries.

Saint-Béat-Lez (French pronunciation: [sɛ̃ bea lɛz]; Occitan: Sent Biat e Les) is a commune in the Haute-Garonne department in southwestern France. The municipality was established on 1 January 2019 and consists of the communes of Lez and Saint-Béat.
