= Projan =

- Commune
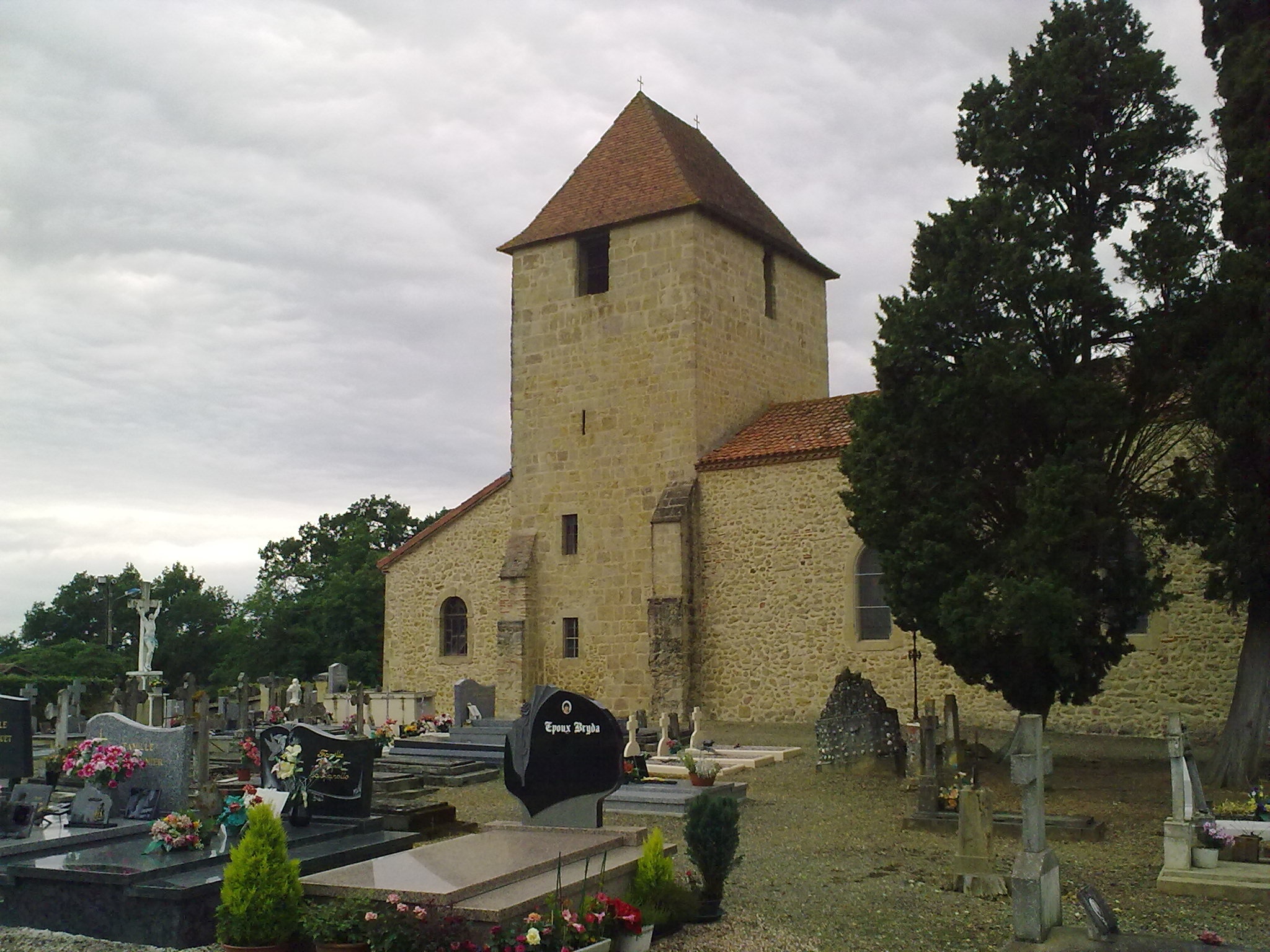
- The church in Projan

- Coat of arms
- Location of Projan
- Location within France Location within Occitanie
- Coordinates: 43°36′02″N 0°14′09″W
- Country: France
- Region: Occitania
- Department: Gers
- Arrondissement: Mirande
- Canton: Adour-Gersoise

Government
  - Mayor (2020–2026): Jacques Pargade
- Area^{1}: 11.78 km^{2} (4.55 sq mi)
- Elevation: 200 m (660 ft)
- Highest elevation: 231 m (758 ft)
- Lowest elevation: 92 m (302 ft)
- Population (2023): 182
  - Density: 15.4/km^{2} (40.0/sq mi)
- Time zone: UTC+01:00 (CET)
  - Summer (DST): UTC+02:00 (CEST)
- INSEE/Postal code: 32333 /32400
- ^{1} French Land Register data, which excludes lakes, ponds, glaciers > 1 km^{2} (0.386 sq mi or 247 acres) and river estuaries.

Projan (French pronunciation: [pʁɔʒɑ̃]) is a commune in the Gers department in southwestern France.

== Geography ==
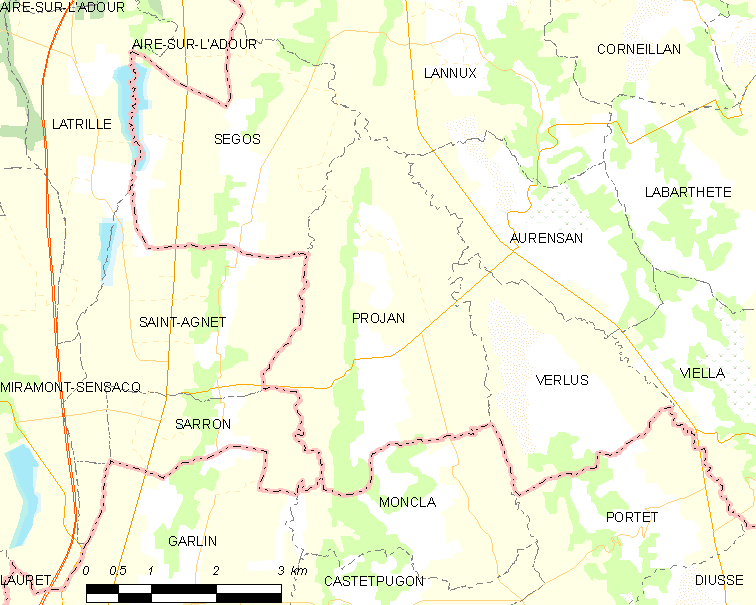
Projan and its surrounding communes

== Population ==
Historical population
Year	Pop.	±% p.a.
1968	197	—
1975	154	−3.46%
1982	140	−1.35%
1990	172	+2.61%
1999	142	−2.11%
2007	146	+0.35%
2012	162	+2.10%
2017	184	+2.58%
2023	182	−0.18%
Source: INSEE

== Heraldry ==
Coat of arms of Projan	Azure, a gold gate, masoned sable, open of the field; on a chief gules, three silver swords placed in saltire and in pale, flanked by two gold oak leaves, the one on the dexter side placed bendwise and the one on the sinister side bendwise.

== See also ==
- Communes of the Gers department
