= Viella, Gers =

Viella
- Commune
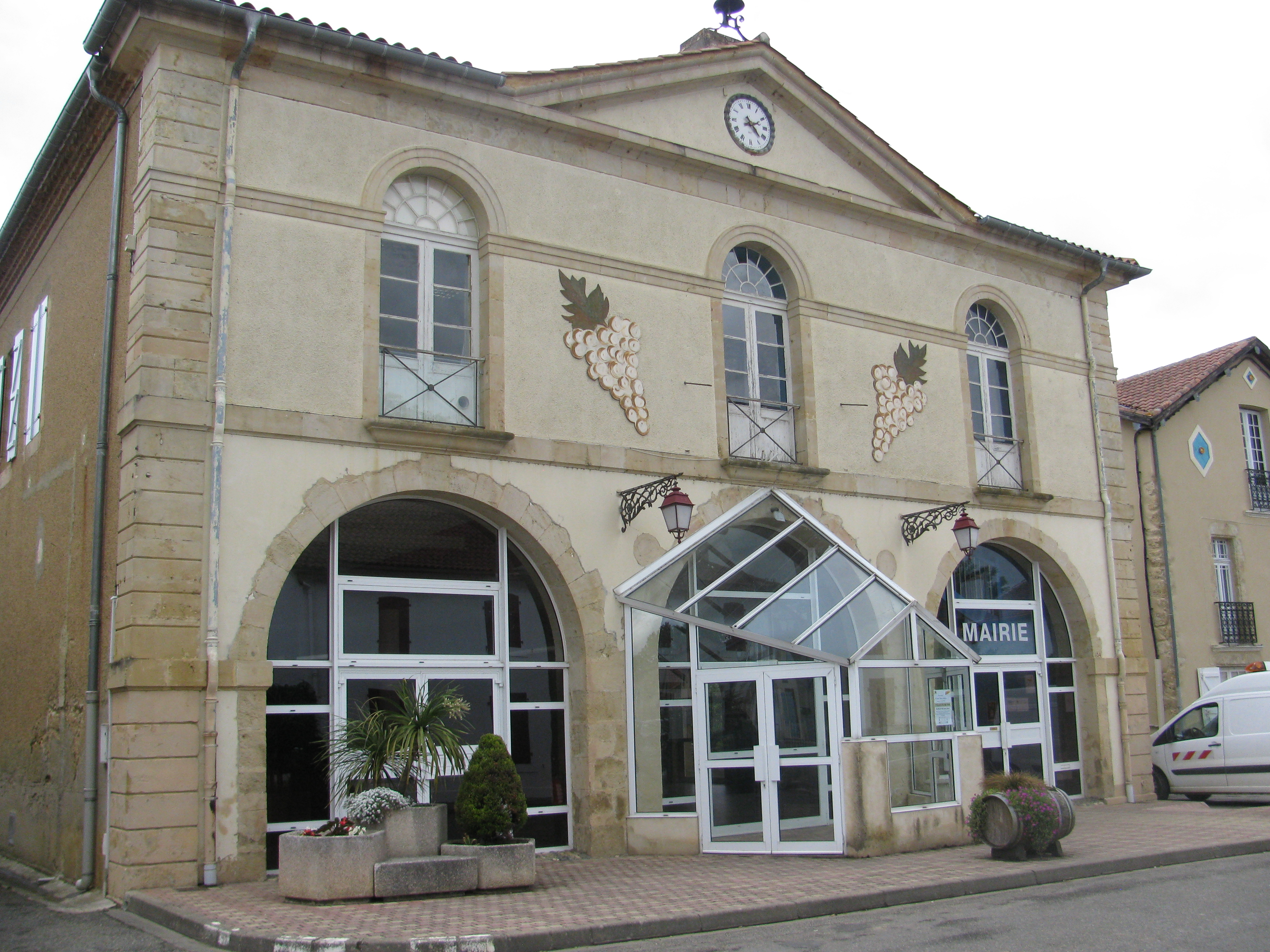
- The town hall in Viella

- Coat of arms
- Location of Viella
- Location within France Location within Occitanie
- Coordinates: 43°35′58″N 0°08′19″W
- Country: France
- Region: Occitania
- Department: Gers
- Arrondissement: Mirande
- Canton: Adour-Gersoise

Government
  - Mayor (2024–2026): Christophe Langlade
- Area^{1}: 22.02 km^{2} (8.50 sq mi)
- Elevation: 241 m (791 ft)
- Highest elevation: 250 m (820 ft)
- Lowest elevation: 109 m (358 ft)
- Population (2023): 530
  - Density: 24/km^{2} (62/sq mi)
- Time zone: UTC+01:00 (CET)
  - Summer (DST): UTC+02:00 (CEST)
- INSEE/Postal code: 32463 /32400
- ^{1} French Land Register data, which excludes lakes, ponds, glaciers > 1 km^{2} (0.386 sq mi or 247 acres) and river estuaries.

Viella (French pronunciation: [vjɛla]; Occitan: Vielar) is a commune in the Gers department in southwestern France.

== Geography ==
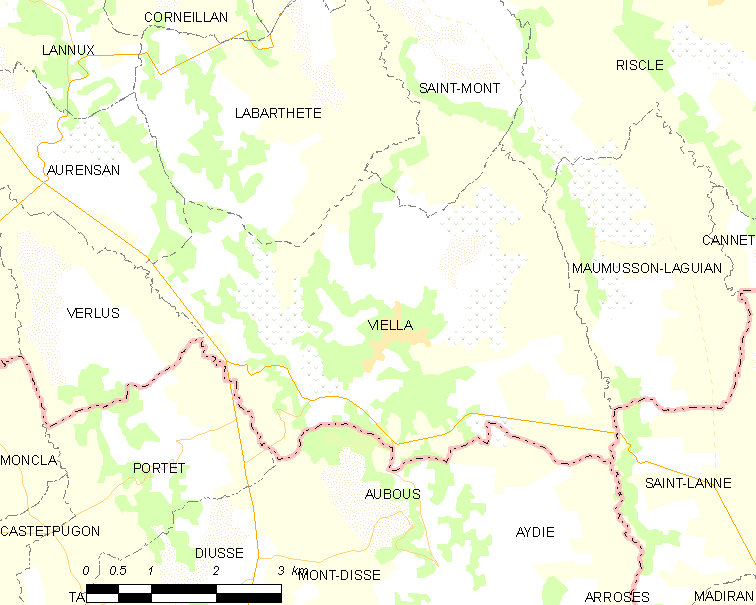
Viella and its surrounding communes

== Population ==
Historical population
Year	Pop.	±% p.a.
1968	674	—
1975	595	−1.77%
1982	626	+0.73%
1990	580	−0.95%
1999	560	−0.39%
2007	535	−0.57%
2012	534	−0.04%
2017	511	−0.88%
2023	530	+0.61%
Source: INSEE

== See also ==
- Communes of the Gers department
