= Léez =

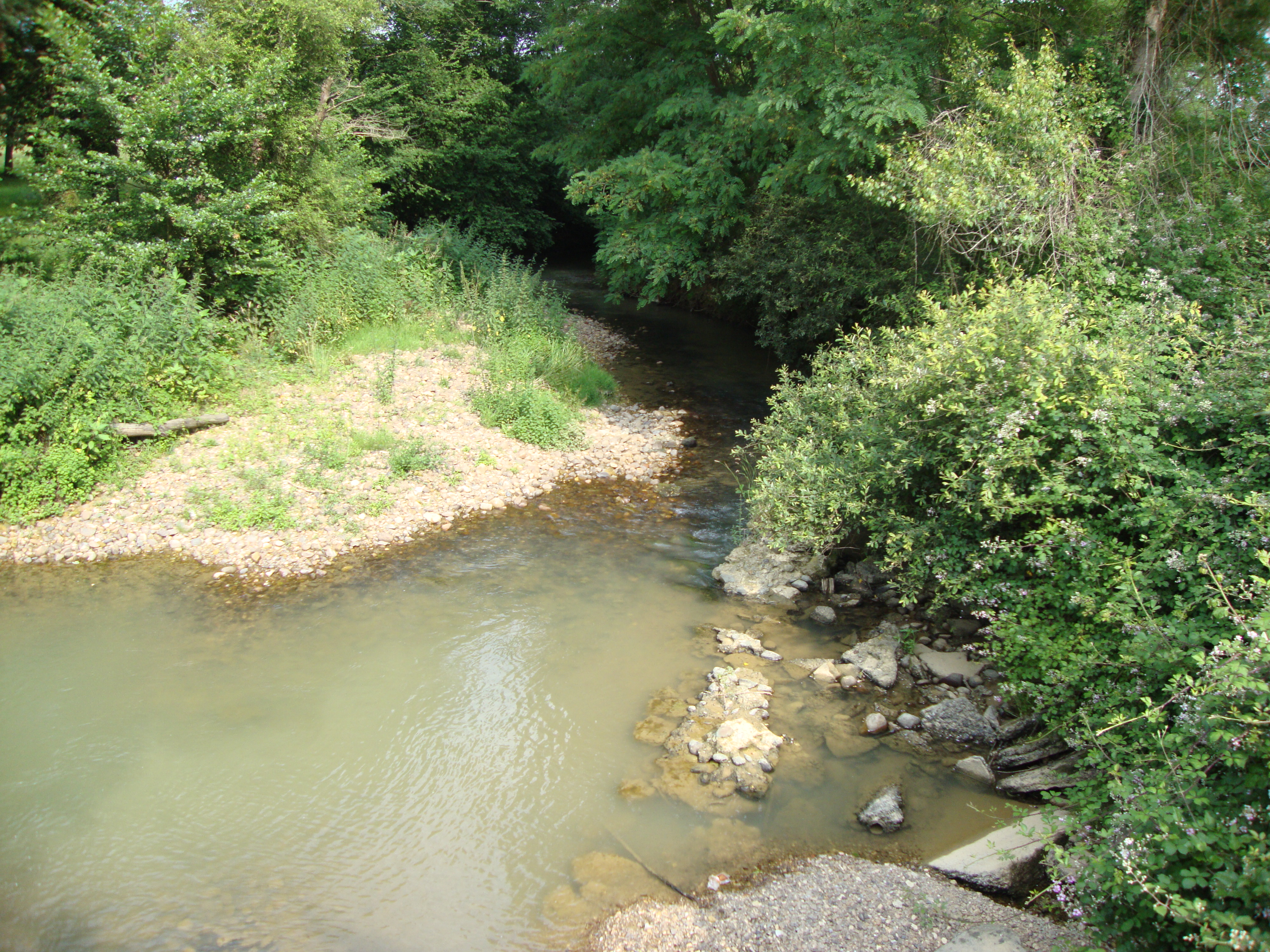

- Location within France Location within Nouvelle-Aquitaine

Location
- Country: France

Physical characteristics
- Source
  - location: near Gardères
- Mouth
  - location: Adour
  - coordinates: 43°41′12″N 0°14′39″W
- Length: 56 km (35 mi)

Basin features
- Progression: Adour→ Atlantic Ocean

The Léez (Leez, Lées, Léès, Lees) is a left tributary of the Adour, in the Southwest of France. It is 56.2 km (34.9 mi) long.

== Name ==
This name proceeds from an Aquitanian hydronym Lez / Liz.

== Geography ==
The Léez rises near Gardères in the north of the plateau of Ger. It flows north through the Vic-Bilh area in the east of the Pyrénées-Atlantiques and joins the Adour in the French département of the Gers, upstream from Aire-sur-l'Adour.

== Main tributaries ==
- (L) the Petit-Léez,
- (L) the Gabassot,
- (R) the Larcis,
- (R) the canal of Bernède, long of 2 km, fed by the Adour.
