= Antichan-de-Frontignes =

- Commune
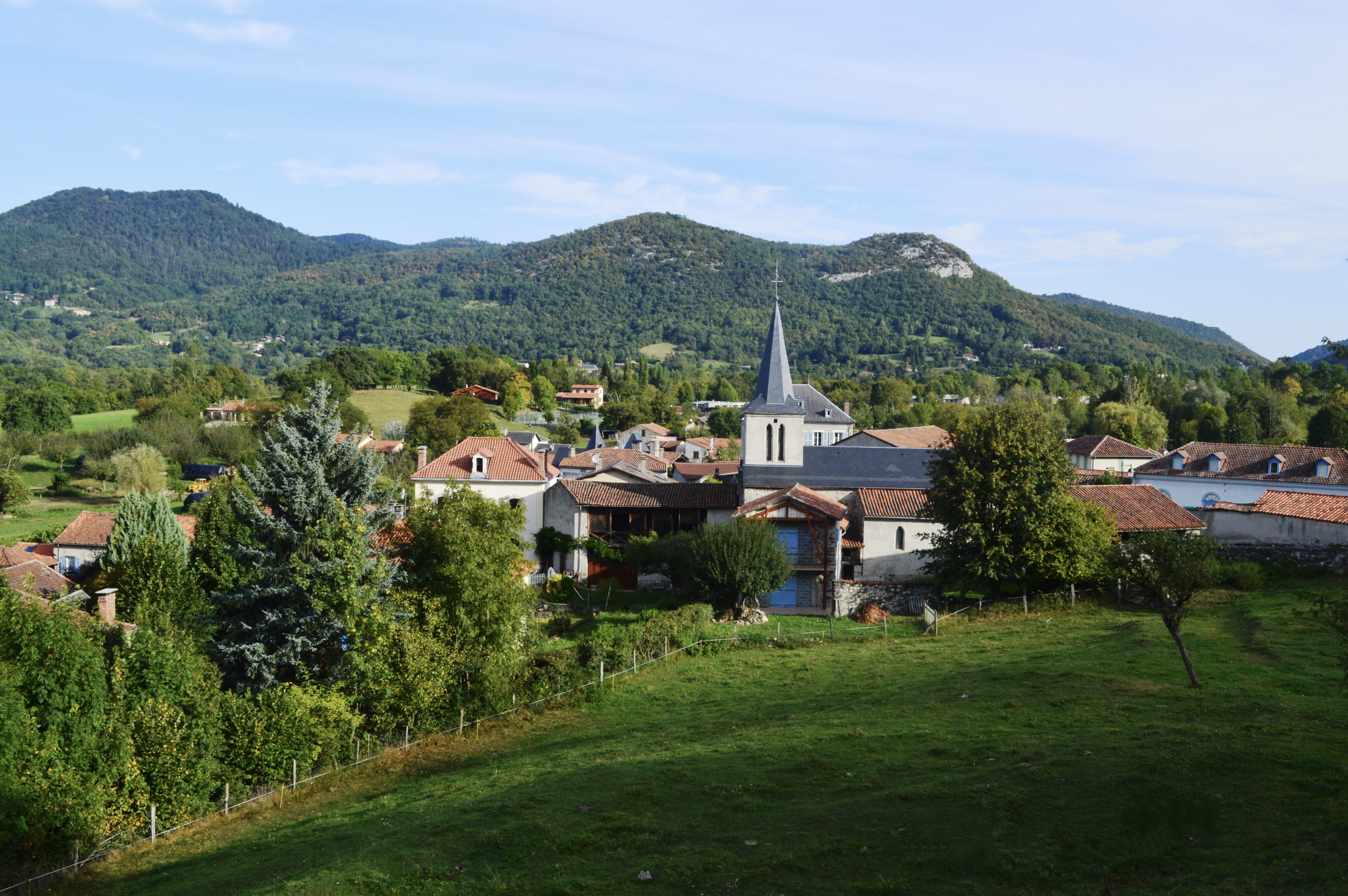
- A general view of Antichan-de-Frontignes
- Location of Antichan-de-Frontignes
- Location within France Location within Occitanie
- Coordinates: 42°58′27″N 0°39′58″E
- Country: France
- Region: Occitania
- Department: Haute-Garonne
- Arrondissement: Saint-Gaudens
- Canton: Bagnères-de-Luchon
- Intercommunality: Pyrénées Haut Garonnaises

Government
  - Mayor (2020–2026): Bernard Dumail
- Area^{1}: 4.27 km^{2} (1.65 sq mi)
- Elevation: 600 m (2,000 ft)
- Highest elevation: 1,655 m (5,430 ft)
- Lowest elevation: 533 m (1,749 ft)
- Population (2023): 158
  - Density: 37.0/km^{2} (95.8/sq mi)
- Time zone: UTC+01:00 (CET)
  - Summer (DST): UTC+02:00 (CEST)
- INSEE/Postal code: 31009 /31510
- ^{1} French Land Register data, which excludes lakes, ponds, glaciers > 1 km^{2} (0.386 sq mi or 247 acres) and river estuaries.

Antichan-de-Frontignes (French pronunciation: [ɑ̃tiʃɑ̃ də fʁɔ̃tiɲ]; Occitan: Antishan de Frontinhas) is a commune in the Haute-Garonne department in the Occitanie region of south-western France.

== Geography ==
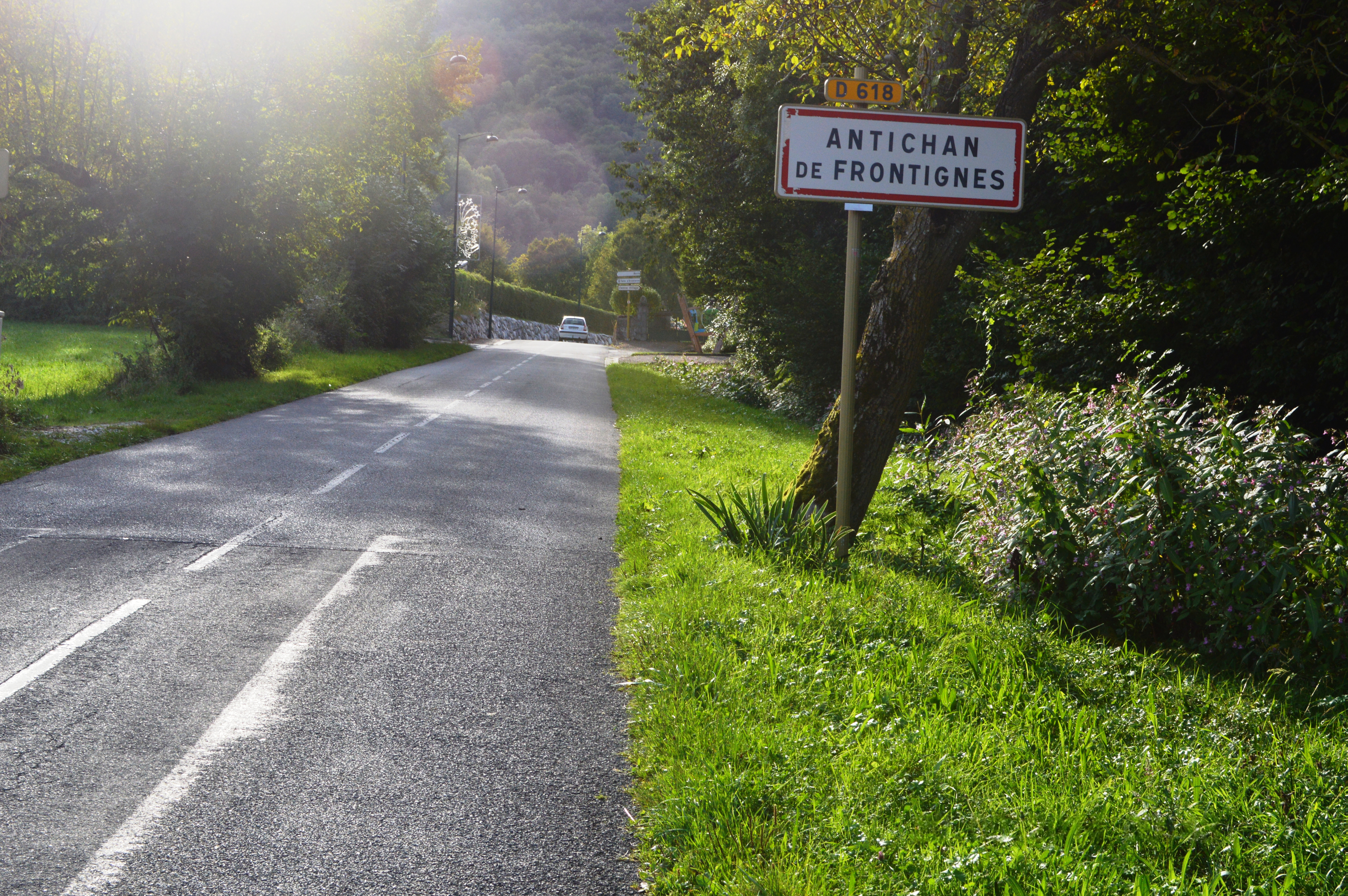
Entry to Antichan-de-Frontignes

Antichan-de-Frontignes is located at the foot of the Pyrenees in the Comminges region some 40 km east by south-east of Bagnères-de-Bigorre and 19 km south by south-west of Saint-Gaudens. Access to the commune is by the D618 road which branches from the D331 east of Ore and goes to the village then continues north-east by a roundabout route to Juzet-d'Izaut. There is also a local road going from the D618 north of the village to Saint-Pé-d'Ardet. Most of the commune is heavily forested however there is some farmland near the village.

== Administration ==
List of Successive Mayors

From	To	Name
2001	2026	Bernard Dumail

== Demography ==
The inhabitants of the commune are known as Antichanais or Antichanaises in French.

Historical population

Year	Pop.	±% p.a.
1793	241	—
1821	288	+0.64%
1846	330	+0.55%
1872	309	−0.25%
1901	258	−0.62%
1926	238	−0.32%
1946	112	−3.70%
1962	96	−0.96%
1968	92	−0.71%

Year	Pop.	±% p.a.
1975	71	−3.63%
1982	75	+0.79%
1990	73	−0.34%
1999	84	+1.57%
2007	82	−0.30%
2012	91	+2.10%
2017	157	+11.52%
2023	158	+0.11%

Source: EHESS and INSEE

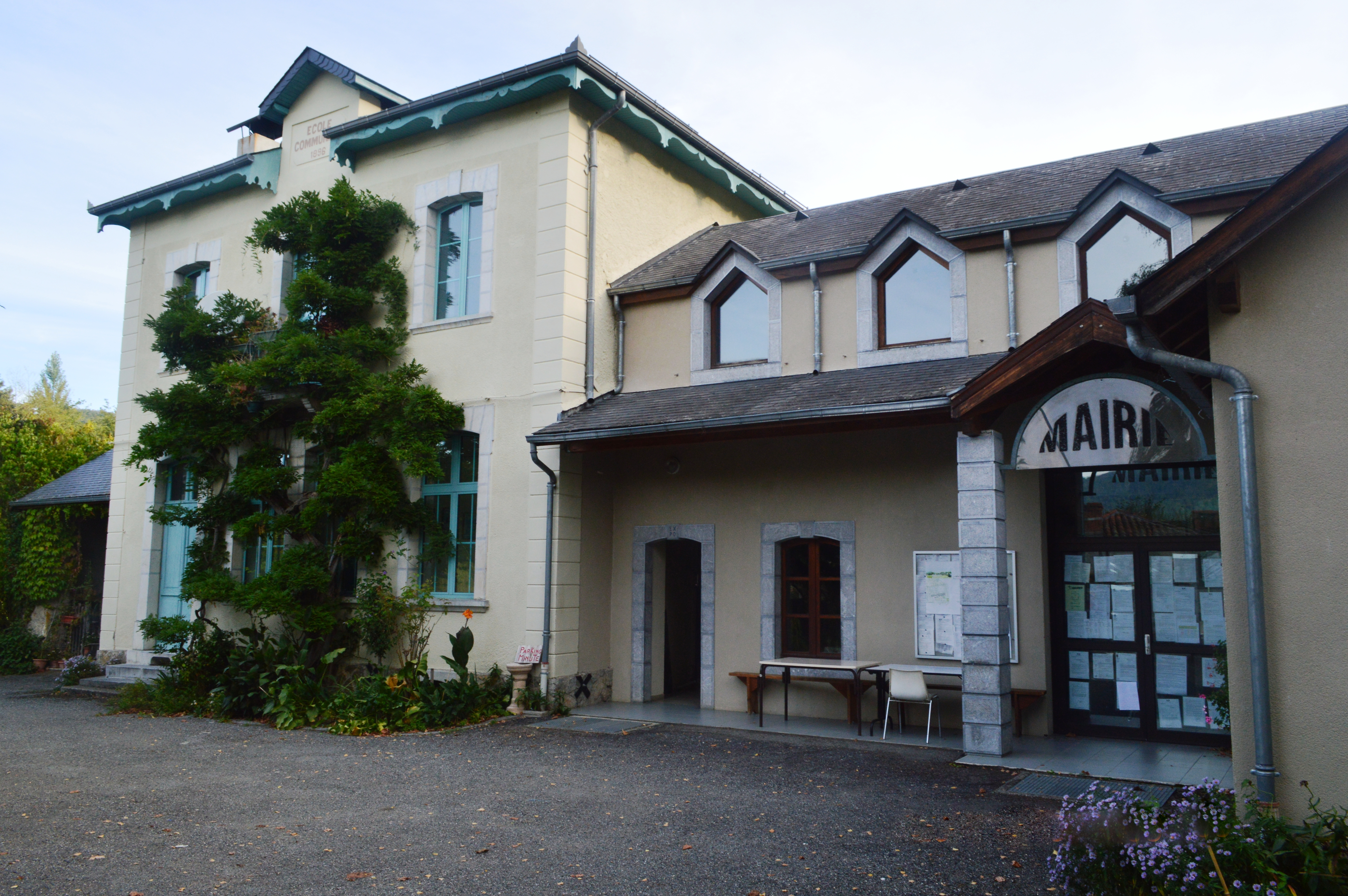
The Town Hall and School

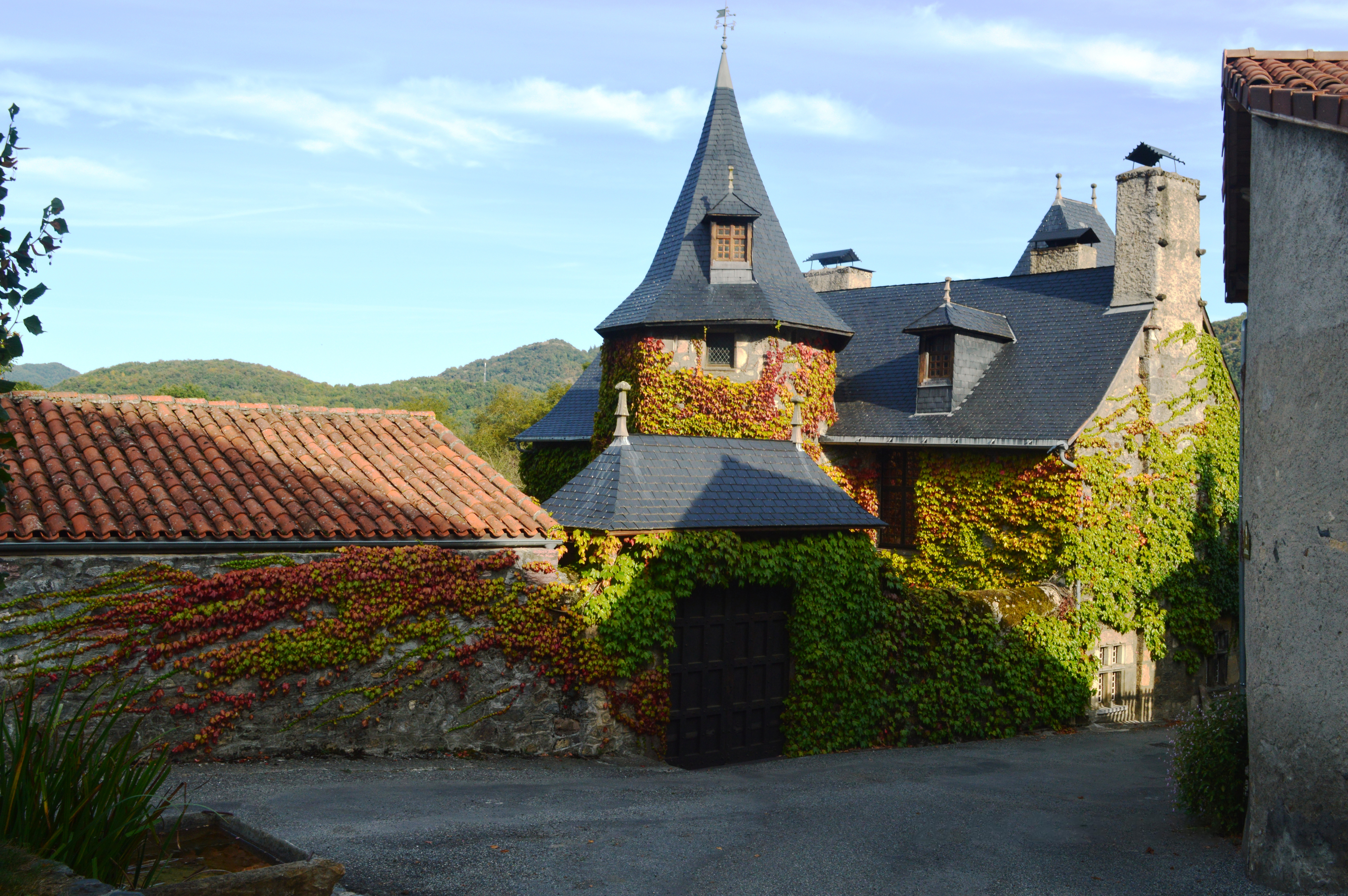
A Street in Antichan-de-Frontignes

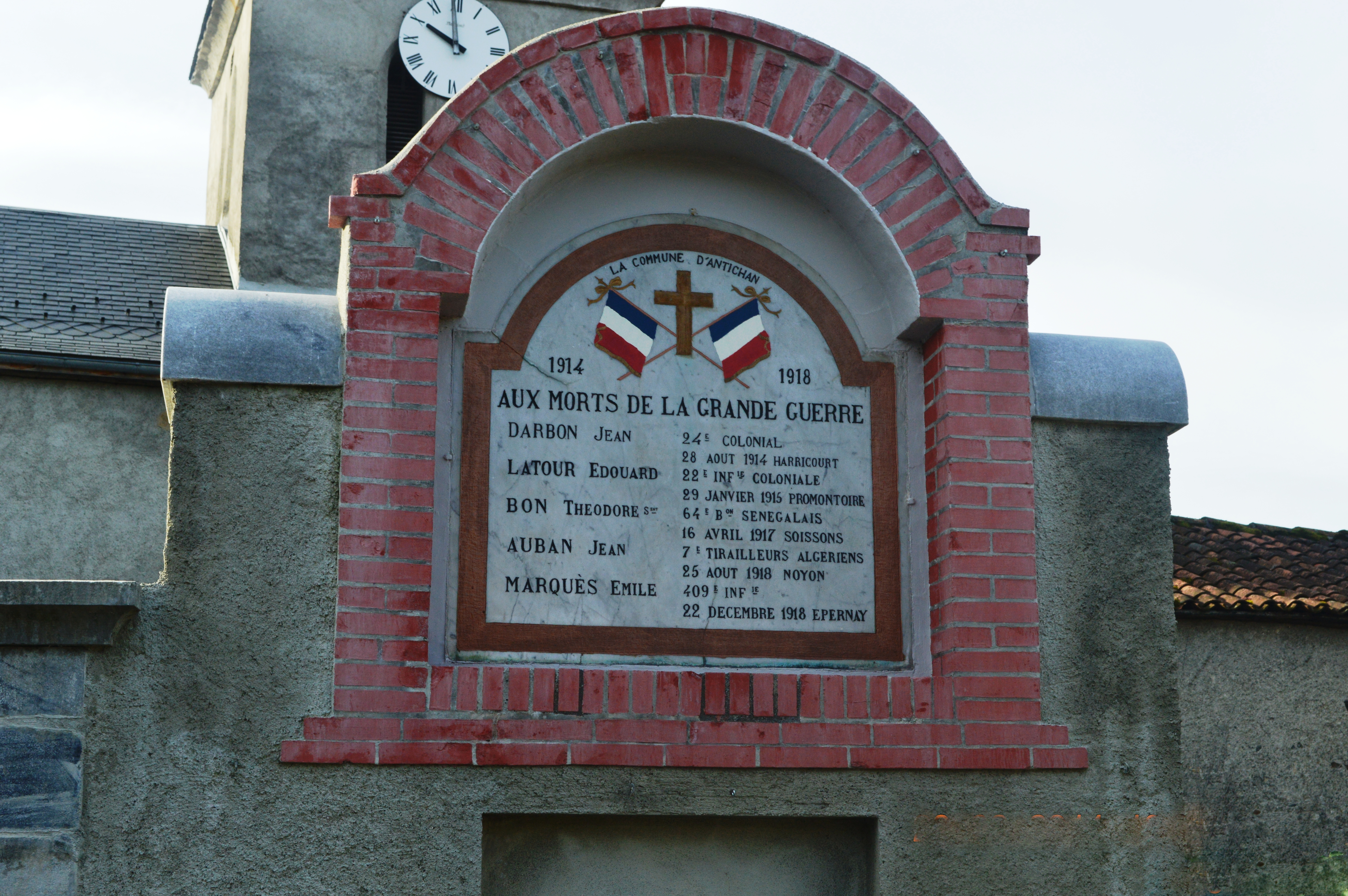
Antichan-de-Frontignes War Memorial

== Sites and monuments ==
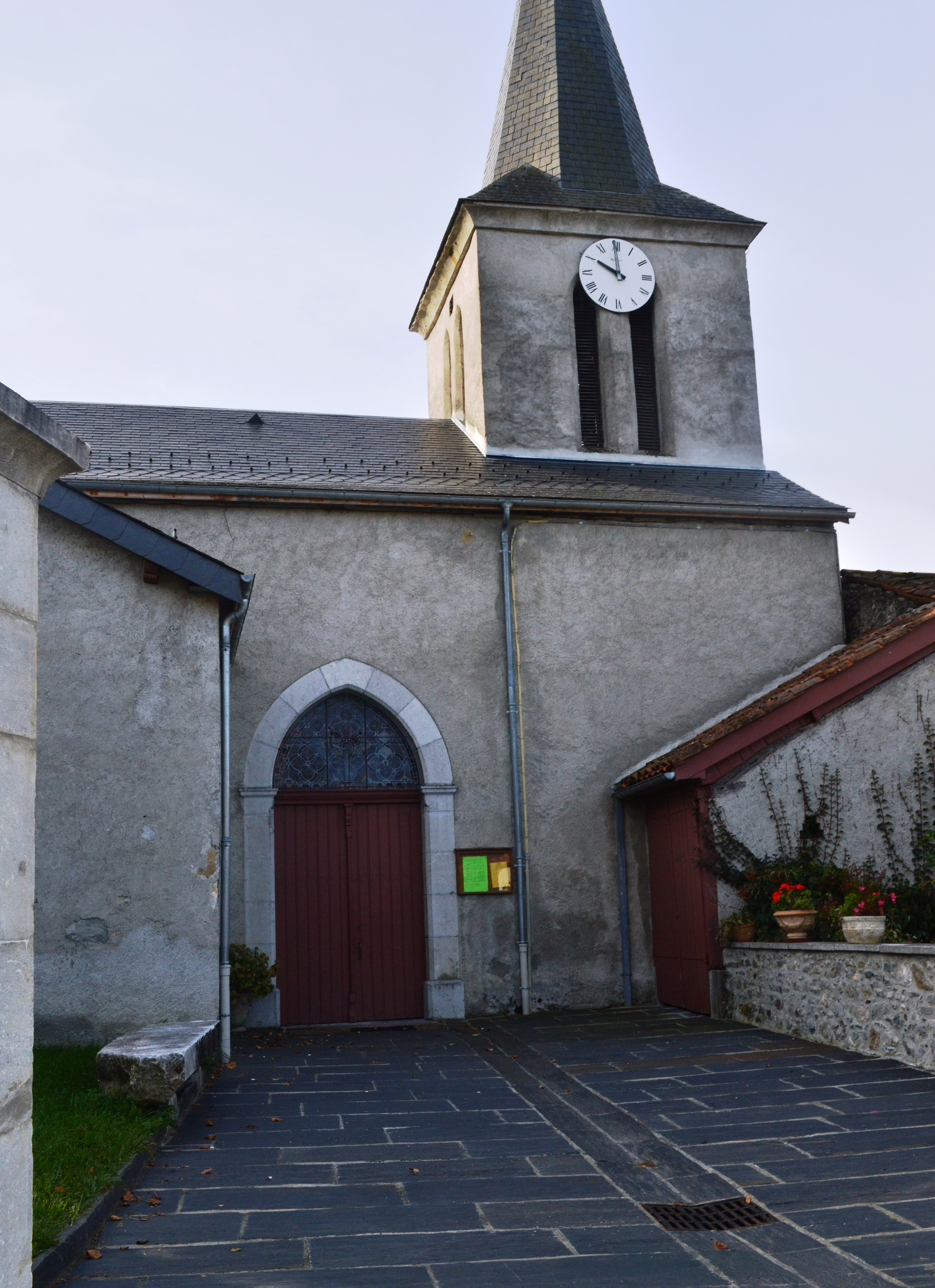
The Church of Notre Dame of the Assumption

- The village is the point of departure for a hiking trail which crosses the Col des Ares 4.5 km from the village then continues to the summits of the Pic du Gar and the Saillant Peak.
- The Church of Notre-Dame of the Assumption

== See also ==
- Communes of the Haute-Garonne department
