= Eup, Haute-Garonne =

Commune in Occitania, France

Eup
- Commune
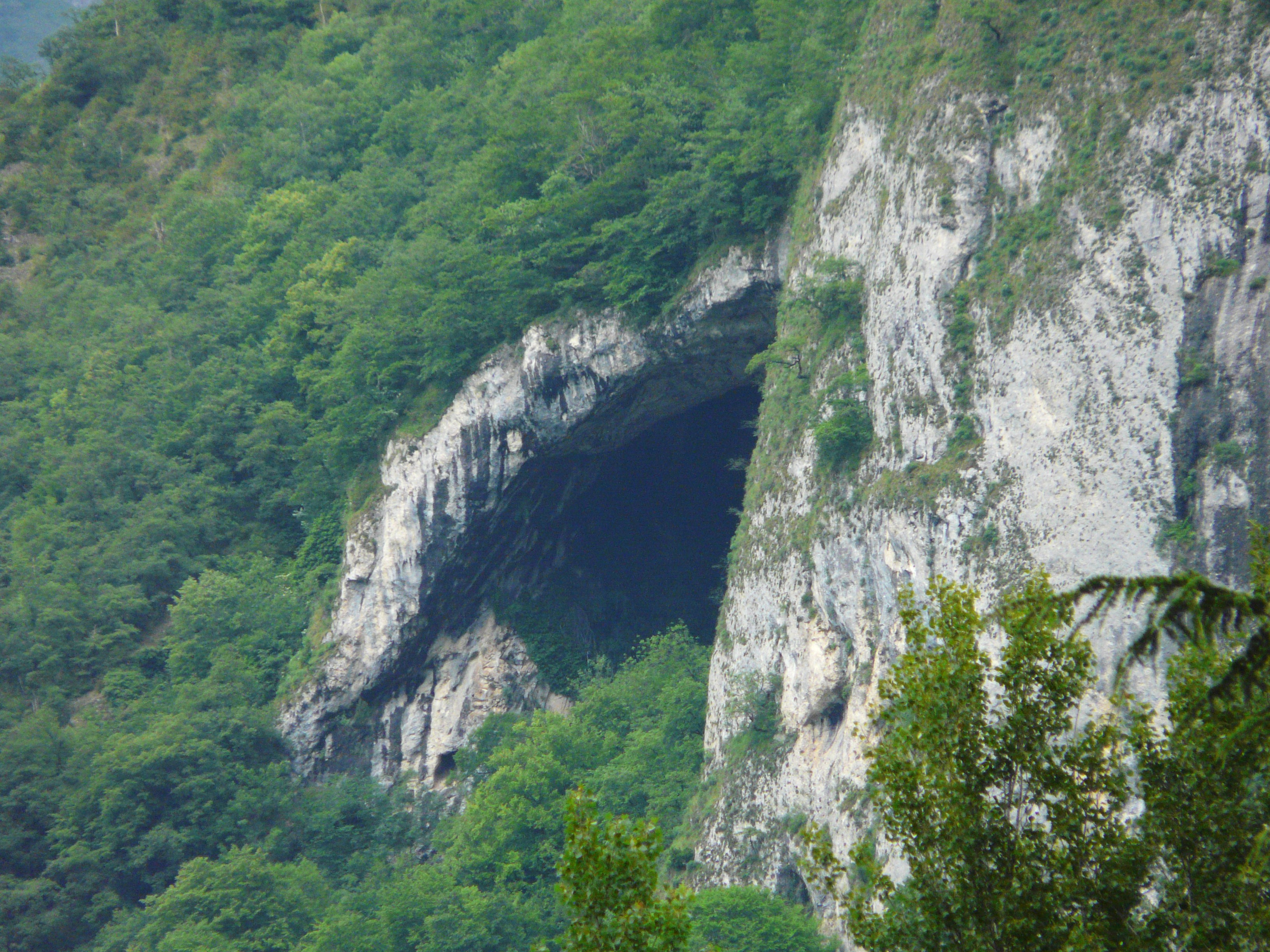
- Mail du Faucon cave
- Location of Eup
- Location within France Location within Occitanie
- Coordinates: 42°55′42″N 0°41′27″E
- Country: France
- Region: Occitania
- Department: Haute-Garonne
- Arrondissement: Saint-Gaudens
- Canton: Bagnères-de-Luchon
- Intercommunality: Pyrénées Haut Garonnaises

Government
  - Mayor (2020–2026): Mathieu Peremiquel
- Area^{1}: 2.22 km^{2} (0.86 sq mi)
- Elevation: 530 m (1,740 ft)
- Highest elevation: 1,259 m (4,131 ft)
- Lowest elevation: 471 m (1,545 ft)
- Population (2023): 139
  - Density: 62.6/km^{2} (162/sq mi)
- Time zone: UTC+01:00 (CET)
  - Summer (DST): UTC+02:00 (CEST)
- INSEE/Postal code: 31177 /31440
- ^{1} French Land Register data, which excludes lakes, ponds, glaciers > 1 km^{2} (0.386 sq mi or 247 acres) and river estuaries.

Eup (French pronunciation: [œp]; Occitan: Eup) is a commune in the Haute-Garonne department in southwestern France.

== Population ==
Historical population
Year	Pop.	±% p.a.
1968	128	—
1975	141	+1.39%
1982	157	+1.55%
1990	151	−0.49%
1999	146	−0.37%
2007	138	−0.70%
2012	135	−0.44%
2017	133	−0.30%
2023	139	+0.74%
Source: INSEE

== See also ==
- Communes of the Haute-Garonne department
- Pic du Gar
