= Saint-Pé-d'Ardet =

- Commune
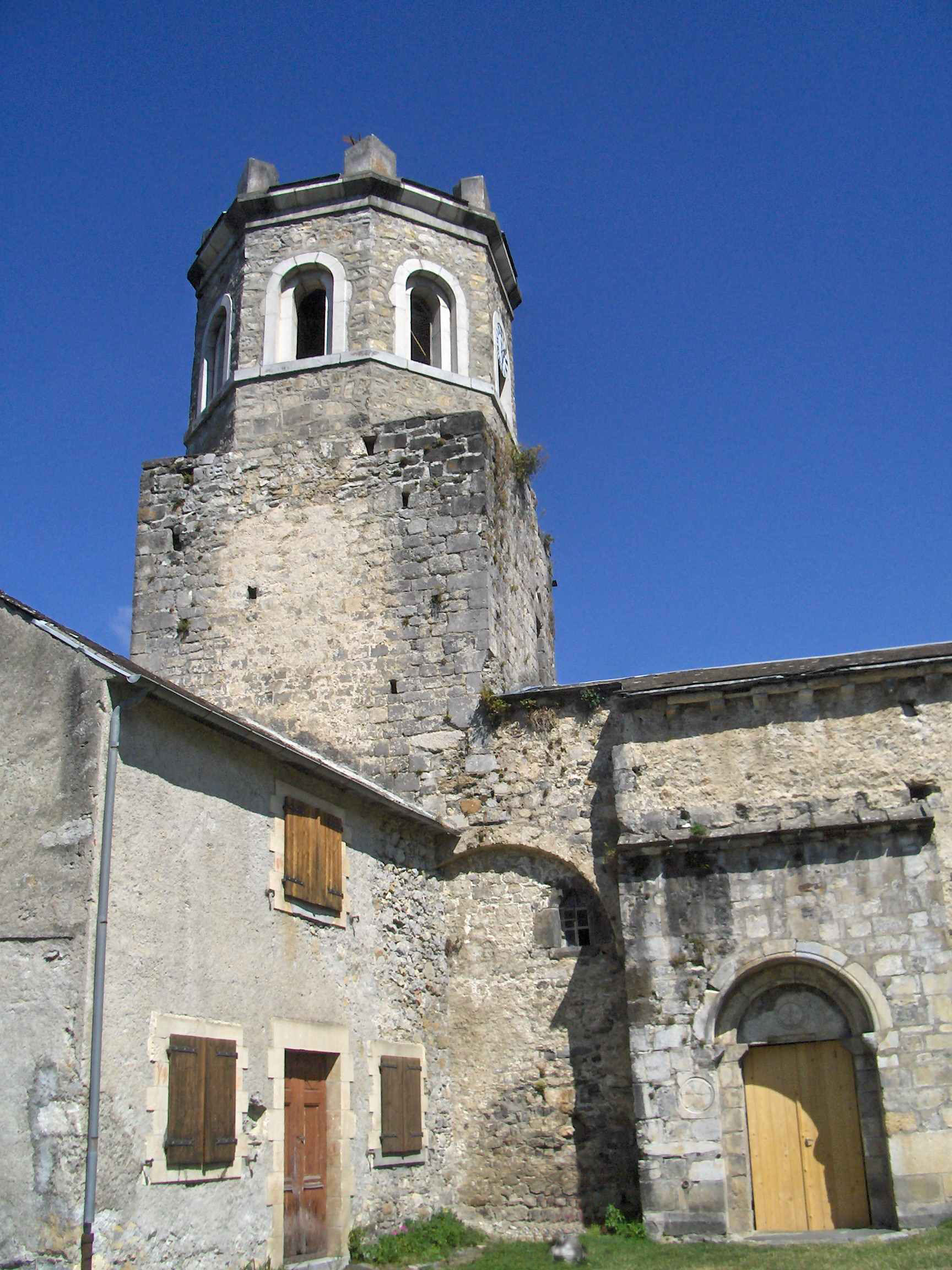
- The church in Saint-Pé-d'Ardet

- Coat of arms
- Location of Saint-Pé-d'Ardet
- Location within France Location within Occitanie
- Coordinates: 42°59′09″N 0°40′18″E
- Country: France
- Region: Occitania
- Department: Haute-Garonne
- Arrondissement: Saint-Gaudens
- Canton: Bagnères-de-Luchon

Government
  - Mayor (2022–2026): Jérôme Deu
- Area^{1}: 3.47 km^{2} (1.34 sq mi)
- Elevation: 598 m (1,962 ft)
- Highest elevation: 1,001 m (3,284 ft)
- Lowest elevation: 575 m (1,886 ft)
- Population (2023): 166
  - Density: 47.8/km^{2} (124/sq mi)
- Time zone: UTC+01:00 (CET)
  - Summer (DST): UTC+02:00 (CEST)
- INSEE/Postal code: 31509 /31510
- ^{1} French Land Register data, which excludes lakes, ponds, glaciers > 1 km^{2} (0.386 sq mi or 247 acres) and river estuaries.

Saint-Pé-d'Ardet (French pronunciation: [sɛ̃ pe daʁdɛ]; Gascon: Sent Pèr d'Ardet) is a commune in the Haute-Garonne department in southwestern France.

== Population ==
Historical population
| Year | Pop. | ±% p.a. |
|---|---|---|
| 1968 | 101 | — |
| 1975 | 98 | −0.43% |
| 1982 | 117 | +2.56% |
| 1990 | 116 | −0.11% |
| 1999 | 114 | −0.19% |
| 2007 | 132 | +1.85% |
| 2012 | 124 | −1.24% |
| 2017 | 148 | +3.60% |
| 2023 | 166 | +1.93% |
Source: INSEE

== See also ==
- Communes of the Haute-Garonne department
- Pic du Gar
