= Pic du Gar =

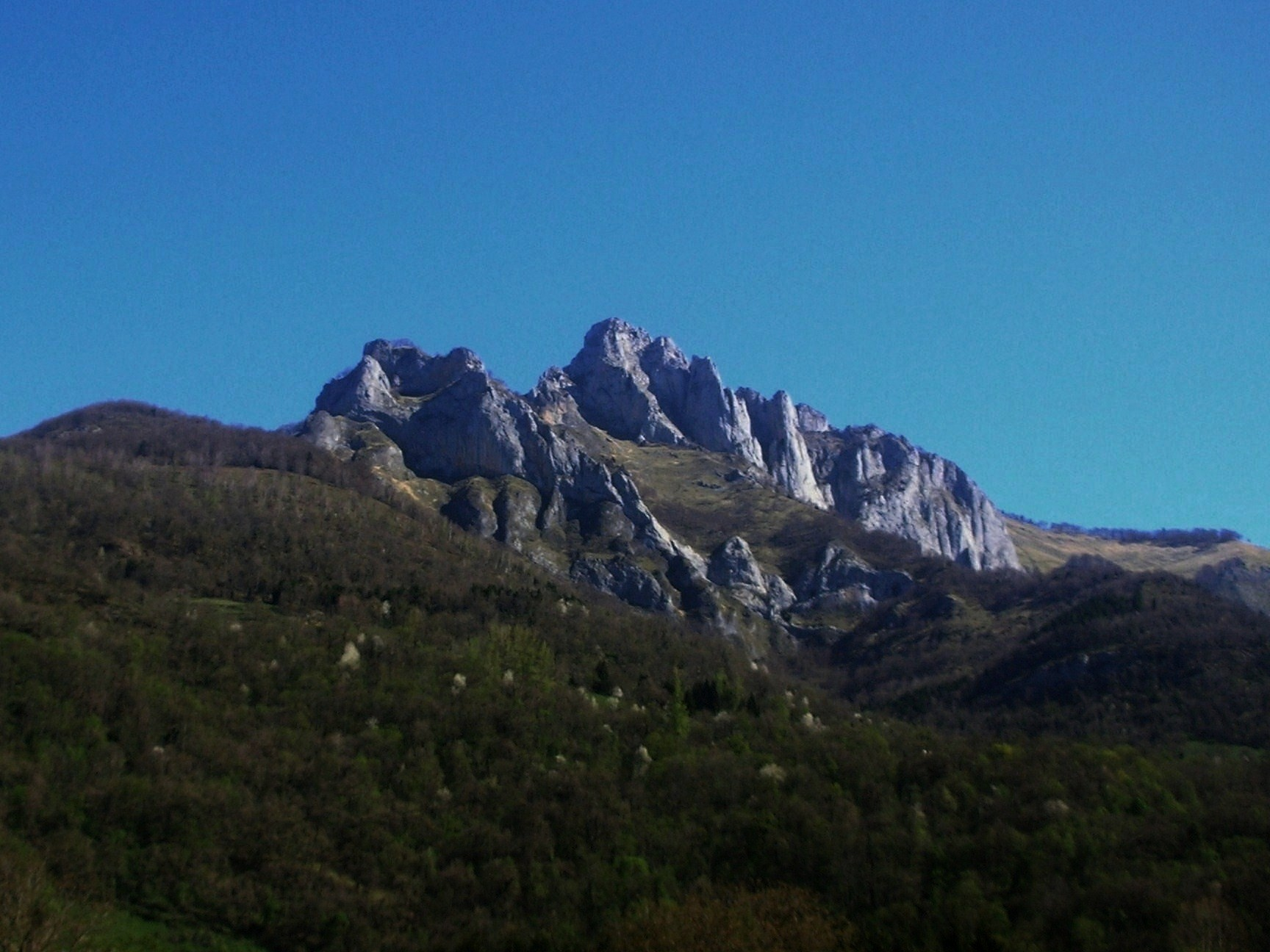
- Pic du Gar (right) seen from Eup

Highest point
- Elevation: 1,785 m (5,856 ft)
- Prominence: 438.9 m (1,440 ft)
- Isolation: 4.64 km (2.88 mi) to Sommet des Parets
- Coordinates: 42°56′55″N 0°41′47″E

Geography
- Location within Pyrenees
- Location: Haute-Garonne, France
- Parent range: Pyrenees

Geology
- Mountain type: Karstic

Climbing
- First ascent: Unknown
- Easiest route: From Eup or Saint-Pé-d'Ardet

Pic du Gar is a mountain of the Pyrenees. It is located near Saint-Béat, Haute-Garonne département, in the Comminges natural region. The limestone mountain has an altitude of 1,785 metres (5,856 ft) above sea level.

Despite its relatively low altitude, the Pic du Gar, like the Pic de Cagire, is a well-known summit of the Haute-Garonne. Its imposing silhouette dominates the high valley of the Garonne, after flowing from the Val d'Aran. Its secondary summit, the Pic Saillant (1756 m), has a summit cross.
