= Estates of Béarn =

The Estates of Béarn are the former Provincial Estates of Béarn. It was formed following the death of Gaston III/X of Foix-Béarn, alias Gaston Phoebus, on 1 August 1391, as a sort of Extraordinary Assembly, regrouping the representatives of the various courts of Béarn, most notably those of the "Cour des Communautés" and of the "fr:Cour majour" that had been disbanded by Gaston Phoebus.

It assembled for the first time on 8 August 1391 and held its last meeting from 12–23 October 1789. However, it was dissolved in 1620 amid strong opposition voiced by the Bearnese representatives, following the royal military expedition to Pau. The Chancery of Navarre and the Estates of Béarn were merged into the Parliament of Navarre.

When the National Assembly abolished all privileges on 4 August 1789, an exception was made allowing the Estates of Béarn to express their consent. Deliberations took place in a charged atmosphere, and in the end the decree of 4 August 1789 was approved on 28 October 1789.

== Composition ==
The Estates of Béarn were composed of two orders: the "First Order" made of the clergy and the nobility of Béarn and the "Second Order" composed of the Third Estate

The Clergy had the first place and held the presidency in the chamber of the nobility. It was made of five members: the Bishop of Lescar, the Bishop of Oloron, the abbot of Lucq, the abbot of Larreule and the abbot of Sauvelade.

The nobility was made of all the owners of baronies, seigneuries, secular abbeys, noble lands and noble homes, without regard to their personal qualities.

The Third Estate was composed of forty-two representatives of the main communes of the province's 480 communes. These representatives were not elected; they were mayors and jurats and generally owners of offices or had commissions granted by the King, most notably:

- the four towns of Morlaàs, who presided the Second Corps, Orthez, Oloron and Sauveterre;
- the three valleys of Ossau, Aspe and Barétous;
- initially, the six cities of Navarrenx, Pau, Monein, Nay, Lembeye and Salies, later also the cities of Lescar and Sainte-Marie;
- the villages of Bruges, Bellocq, Lagor, Gan, Pontacq, Montaner, Garlin, Pardies, Maslacq, Loubieng, Castétis, Conchez, Jurançon, Garos, Garlin, Labastide-Villefranche, Asson, Vielleségure, Mur and Castagnède, Gurs, Thèze, Labastide-Monréjeau, Ger, Beuste, Larreule, Uzan, Mazerolles, Montagut, Moncaup and Monpezat;
- the Josbaig Valley.
