= Loncon =

Loncon is the name given to three Worldcon (science fiction) conventions held in London, England.

- Loncon I, 1957
- Loncon II, 1965
- Loncon 3, 2014

== Other ==
- Lonçon, a commune in the Pyrénées-Atlantiques department of France
