= Seby =

Seby may refer to:

== People ==
- Seby B. Jones (1915–2002), American politician
- Seby Zavala (born 1993), American baseball player

== Places ==
- Seby, Öland, Sweden
- Séby, France
