= Cabidos =

- Commune
- Location of Cabidos
- Location within France Location within Nouvelle-Aquitaine
- Coordinates: 43°32′32″N 0°27′46″W
- Country: France
- Region: Nouvelle-Aquitaine
- Department: Pyrénées-Atlantiques
- Arrondissement: Pau
- Canton: Artix et Pays de Soubestre
- Intercommunality: Luys en Béarn

Government
  - Mayor (2024–2026): Abdel Aberchane
- Area^{1}: 7.26 km^{2} (2.80 sq mi)
- Elevation: 158 m (518 ft)
- Highest elevation: 233 m (764 ft)
- Lowest elevation: 85 m (279 ft)
- Population (2023): 171
  - Density: 23.6/km^{2} (61.0/sq mi)
- Time zone: UTC+01:00 (CET)
  - Summer (DST): UTC+02:00 (CEST)
- INSEE/Postal code: 64158 /64410
- ^{1} French Land Register data, which excludes lakes, ponds, glaciers > 1 km^{2} (0.386 sq mi or 247 acres) and river estuaries.

Cabidos (French pronunciation: [kabidɔs]; Occitan: Cabidòs) is a commune in the Pyrénées-Atlantiques department in south-western France.

== Population ==
Historical population
Year	Pop.	±% p.a.
1968	172	—
1975	134	−3.50%
1982	139	+0.52%
1990	129	−0.93%
1999	133	+0.34%
2007	161	+2.42%
2012	186	+2.93%
2017	180	−0.65%
2023	171	−0.85%
Source: INSEE

== See also ==
- Communes of the Pyrénées-Atlantiques department
