= Bouillon, Pyrénées-Atlantiques =

Bouillon
- Commune
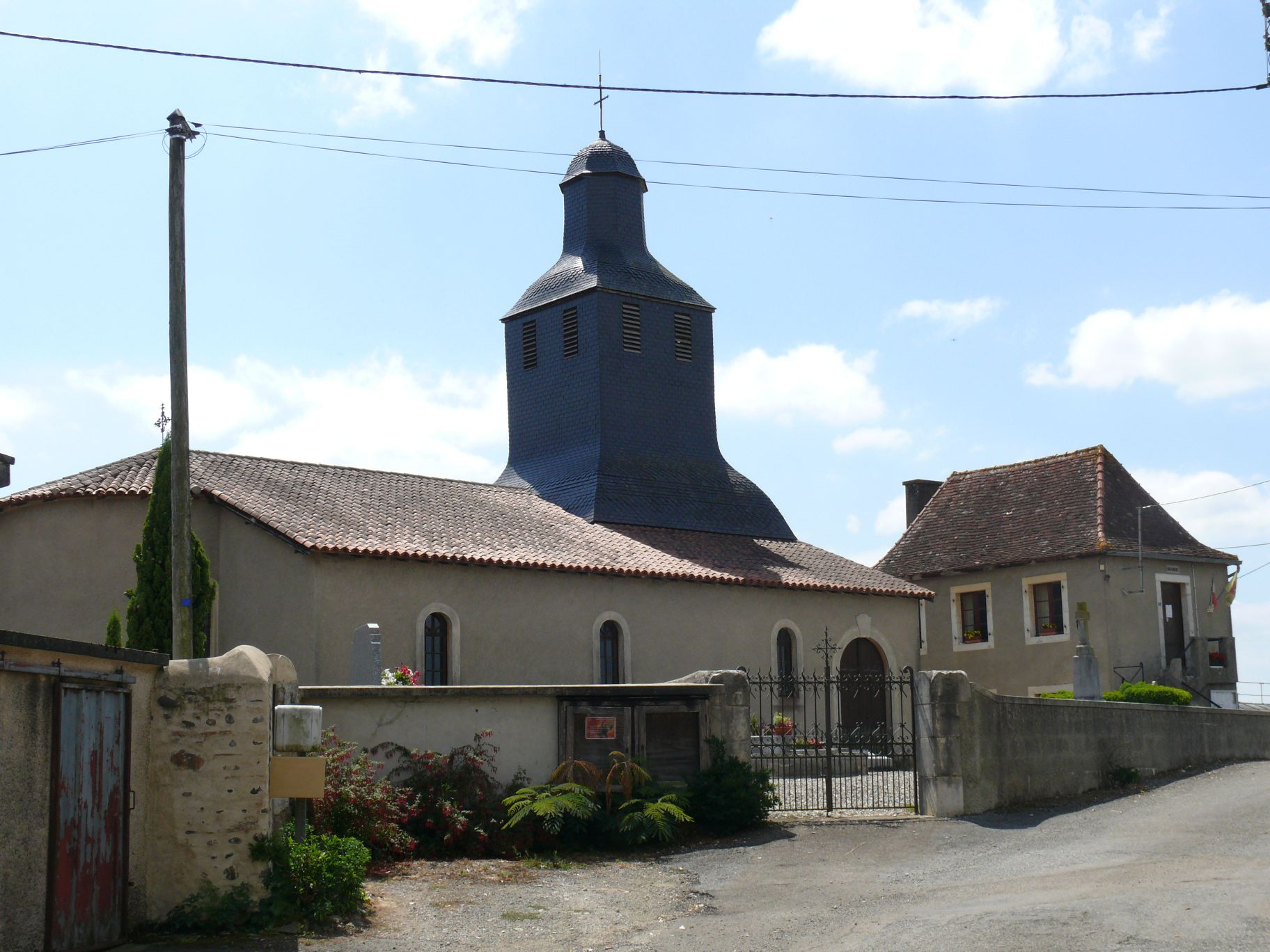
- The church of Saint-Martin, in Bouillon
- Location of Bouillon
- Location within France Location within Nouvelle-Aquitaine
- Coordinates: 43°29′41″N 0°30′00″W
- Country: France
- Region: Nouvelle-Aquitaine
- Department: Pyrénées-Atlantiques
- Arrondissement: Pau
- Canton: Artix et Pays de Soubestre
- Intercommunality: Luys en Béarn

Government
  - Mayor (2020–2026): Gérard Locardel
- Area^{1}: 3.27 km^{2} (1.26 sq mi)
- Elevation: 144 m (472 ft)
- Highest elevation: 200 m (660 ft)
- Lowest elevation: 98 m (322 ft)
- Population (2023): 159
  - Density: 48.6/km^{2} (126/sq mi)
- Time zone: UTC+01:00 (CET)
  - Summer (DST): UTC+02:00 (CEST)
- INSEE/Postal code: 64143 /64410
- ^{1} French Land Register data, which excludes lakes, ponds, glaciers > 1 km^{2} (0.386 sq mi or 247 acres) and river estuaries.

Bouillon (French pronunciation: [bujɔ̃]; Occitan: Bolhon) is a commune in the Pyrénées-Atlantiques department in southwestern France.

== See also ==
- Communes of the Pyrénées-Atlantiques department
