= Malaussanne =

- Commune
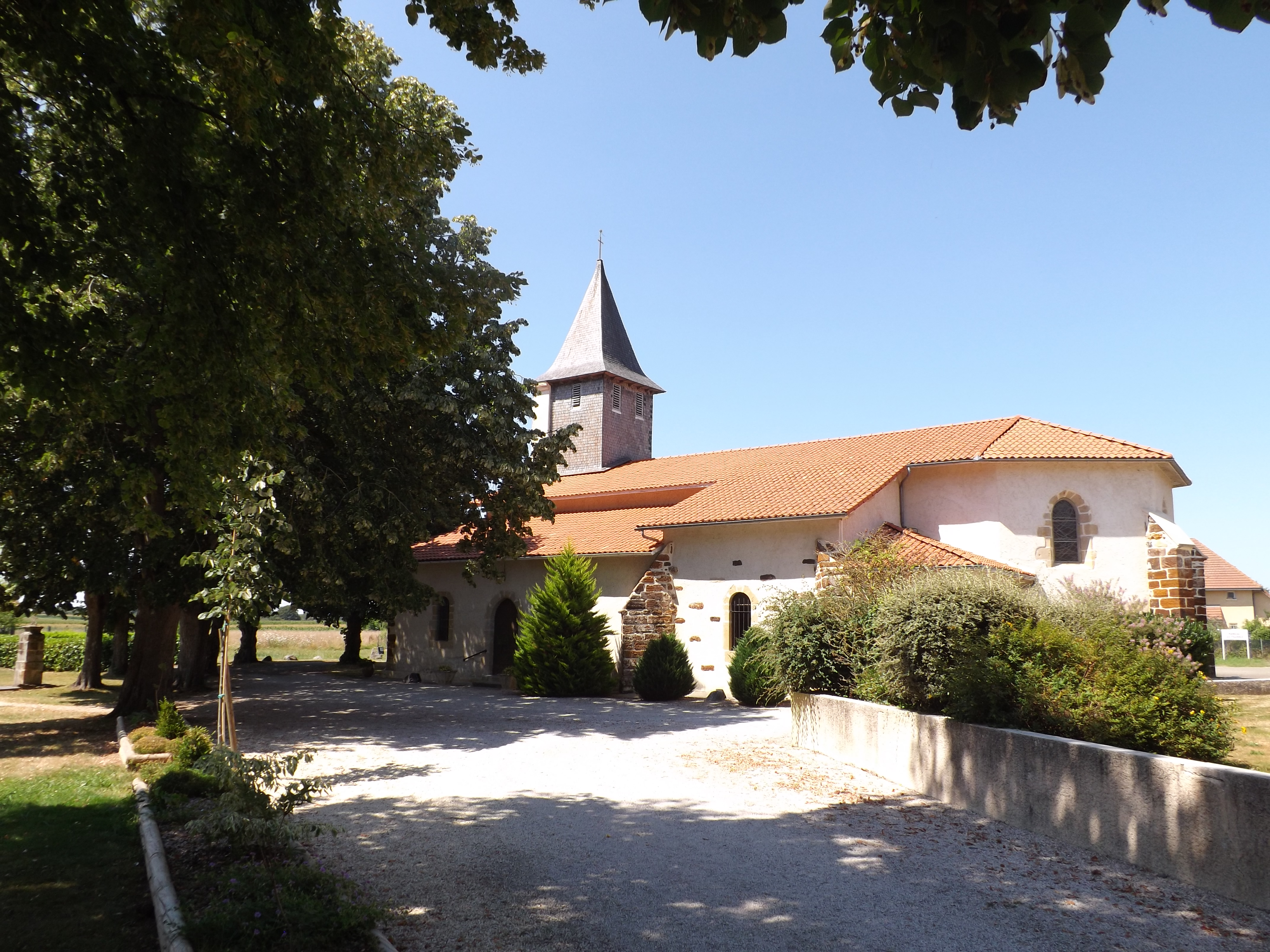
- The church of Malaussane
- Location of Malaussanne
- Location within France Location within Nouvelle-Aquitaine
- Coordinates: 43°33′35″N 0°28′19″W
- Country: France
- Region: Nouvelle-Aquitaine
- Department: Pyrénées-Atlantiques
- Arrondissement: Pau
- Canton: Artix et Pays de Soubestre
- Intercommunality: Luys en Béarn

Government
  - Mayor (2020–2026): Bernard Dupont
- Area^{1}: 17.49 km^{2} (6.75 sq mi)
- Elevation: 165 m (541 ft)
- Highest elevation: 221 m (725 ft)
- Lowest elevation: 76 m (249 ft)
- Population (2023): 450
  - Density: 26/km^{2} (67/sq mi)
- Time zone: UTC+01:00 (CET)
  - Summer (DST): UTC+02:00 (CEST)
- INSEE/Postal code: 64365 /64410
- ^{1} French Land Register data, which excludes lakes, ponds, glaciers > 1 km^{2} (0.386 sq mi or 247 acres) and river estuaries.

Malaussanne (French pronunciation: [malosan]; Occitan: Malaussana) is a commune in the Pyrénées-Atlantiques department in south-western France.

== See also ==
- Communes of the Pyrénées-Atlantiques department
