= Sallespisse =

- Commune
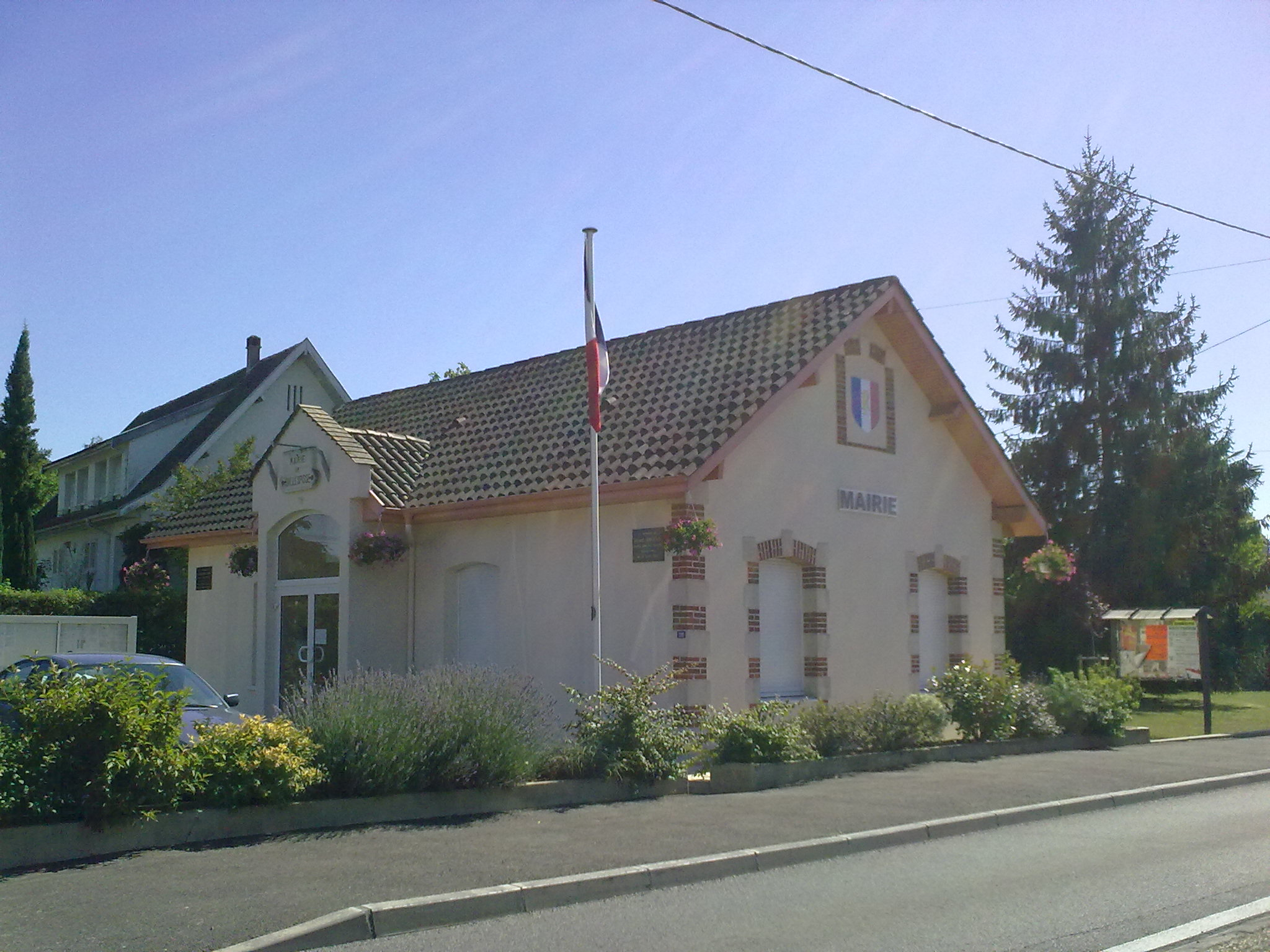
- Town Hall
- Location of Sallespisse
- Location within France Location within Nouvelle-Aquitaine
- Coordinates: 43°31′26″N 0°42′40″W
- Country: France
- Region: Nouvelle-Aquitaine
- Department: Pyrénées-Atlantiques
- Arrondissement: Pau
- Canton: Artix et Pays de Soubestre

Government
  - Mayor (2020–2026): Francis Grinet
- Area^{1}: 15.16 km^{2} (5.85 sq mi)
- Elevation: 98 m (322 ft)
- Highest elevation: 180 m (590 ft)
- Lowest elevation: 78 m (256 ft)
- Population (2023): 591
  - Density: 39.0/km^{2} (101/sq mi)
- Time zone: UTC+01:00 (CET)
  - Summer (DST): UTC+02:00 (CEST)
- INSEE/Postal code: 64501 /64300
- ^{1} French Land Register data, which excludes lakes, ponds, glaciers > 1 km^{2} (0.386 sq mi or 247 acres) and river estuaries.

Sallespisse (French pronunciation: [salɛspis]; Occitan: Salas) is a commune in the Pyrénées-Atlantiques department in south-western France.

== See also ==
- Communes of the Pyrénées-Atlantiques department
