= Momas =

- Commune
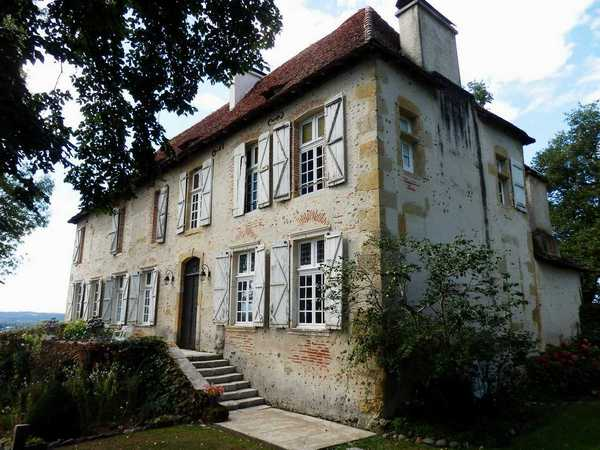
- The château of Momas

- Coat of arms
- Location of Momas
- Location within France Location within Nouvelle-Aquitaine
- Coordinates: 43°27′07″N 0°26′31″W
- Country: France
- Region: Nouvelle-Aquitaine
- Department: Pyrénées-Atlantiques
- Arrondissement: Pau
- Canton: Artix et Pays de Soubestre
- Intercommunality: CC des Luys en Béarn

Government
  - Mayor (2024–2026): Georges Lerclerc
- Area^{1}: 14.51 km^{2} (5.60 sq mi)
- Elevation: 204 m (669 ft)
- Highest elevation: 260 m (850 ft)
- Lowest elevation: 126 m (413 ft)
- Population (2023): 604
  - Density: 41.6/km^{2} (108/sq mi)
- Time zone: UTC+01:00 (CET)
  - Summer (DST): UTC+02:00 (CEST)
- INSEE/Postal code: 64387 /64230
- ^{1} French Land Register data, which excludes lakes, ponds, glaciers > 1 km^{2} (0.386 sq mi or 247 acres) and river estuaries.

Momas (French pronunciation: [mɔmas]; Occitan: Monmans) is a commune in France. It is located in the Pyrénées-Atlantiques departement, in the region of Nouvelle-Aquitaine. It is part of the historical province of Béarn.

== See also ==
- Communes of the Pyrénées-Atlantiques department
