= Poursiugues-Boucoue =

- Commune
- Location of Poursiugues-Boucoue
- Location within France Location within Nouvelle-Aquitaine
- Coordinates: 43°33′02″N 0°22′38″W
- Country: France
- Region: Nouvelle-Aquitaine
- Department: Pyrénées-Atlantiques
- Arrondissement: Pau
- Canton: Artix et Pays de Soubestre
- Intercommunality: Luys en Béarn

Government
  - Mayor (2020–2026): Thierry Saint-Palais
- Area^{1}: 9.02 km^{2} (3.48 sq mi)
- Elevation: 149 m (489 ft)
- Highest elevation: 197 m (646 ft)
- Lowest elevation: 110 m (360 ft)
- Population (2023): 183
  - Density: 20.3/km^{2} (52.5/sq mi)
- Time zone: UTC+01:00 (CET)
  - Summer (DST): UTC+02:00 (CEST)
- INSEE/Postal code: 64457 /64410
- ^{1} French Land Register data, which excludes lakes, ponds, glaciers > 1 km^{2} (0.386 sq mi or 247 acres) and river estuaries.

Poursiugues-Boucoue (French pronunciation: [puʁsjyɡ buku]; Occitan: Porciuvas e Bocoa) is a commune in the Pyrénées-Atlantiques department in south-western France.

== See also ==
- Communes of the Pyrénées-Atlantiques department
