= Fichous-Riumayou =

- Commune
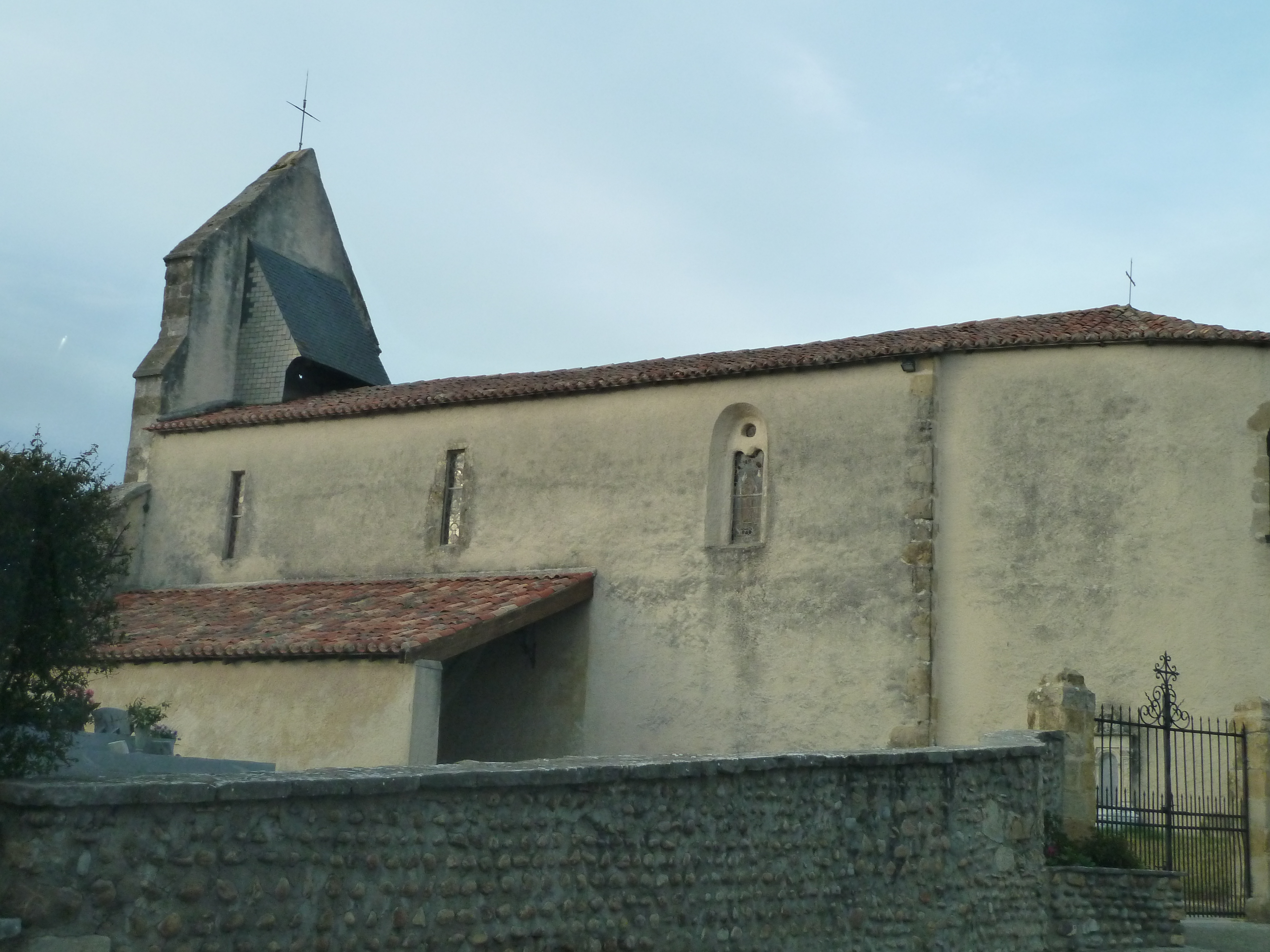
- The church of Saint-Girons, in Fichous-Riumayou
- Location of Fichous-Riumayou
- Location within France Location within Nouvelle-Aquitaine
- Coordinates: 43°29′09″N 0°26′49″W
- Country: France
- Region: Nouvelle-Aquitaine
- Department: Pyrénées-Atlantiques
- Arrondissement: Pau
- Canton: Artix et Pays de Soubestre
- Intercommunality: Luys en Béarn

Government
  - Mayor (2020–2026): Joël Pintadou
- Area^{1}: 6.41 km^{2} (2.47 sq mi)
- Elevation: 242 m (794 ft)
- Highest elevation: 250 m (820 ft)
- Lowest elevation: 120 m (390 ft)
- Population (2023): 207
  - Density: 32.3/km^{2} (83.6/sq mi)
- Time zone: UTC+01:00 (CET)
  - Summer (DST): UTC+02:00 (CEST)
- INSEE/Postal code: 64226 /64410
- ^{1} French Land Register data, which excludes lakes, ponds, glaciers > 1 km^{2} (0.386 sq mi or 247 acres) and river estuaries.

Fichous-Riumayou (French pronunciation: [fiʃus ʁjymaju]; Occitan: Hishós e Rimajor) is a commune in the Pyrénées-Atlantiques department and Nouvelle-Aquitaine region of south-western France.

== See also ==
- Communes of the Pyrénées-Atlantiques department
