= Casteide-Candau =

- Commune
- Location of Casteide-Candau
- Location within France Location within Nouvelle-Aquitaine
- Coordinates: 43°30′57″N 0°33′38″W
- Country: France
- Region: Nouvelle-Aquitaine
- Department: Pyrénées-Atlantiques
- Arrondissement: Pau
- Canton: Artix et Pays de Soubestre
- Intercommunality: Lacq-Orthez

Government
  - Mayor (2020–2026): Jean-Marie Pinon
- Area^{1}: 9.24 km^{2} (3.57 sq mi)
- Elevation: 157 m (515 ft)
- Highest elevation: 215 m (705 ft)
- Lowest elevation: 79 m (259 ft)
- Population (2023): 283
  - Density: 30.6/km^{2} (79.3/sq mi)
- Time zone: UTC+01:00 (CET)
  - Summer (DST): UTC+02:00 (CEST)
- INSEE/Postal code: 64172 /64370
- ^{1} French Land Register data, which excludes lakes, ponds, glaciers > 1 km^{2} (0.386 sq mi or 247 acres) and river estuaries.

Casteide-Candau (French pronunciation: [kastɛd kɑ̃do]; Occitan: Castèida e Candau) is a commune in the Pyrénées-Atlantiques department in south-western France.

== See also ==
- Communes of the Pyrénées-Atlantiques department
