= Serres-Sainte-Marie =

- Commune
- Location of Serres-Sainte-Marie
- Location within France Location within Nouvelle-Aquitaine
- Coordinates: 43°24′56″N 0°33′07″W
- Country: France
- Region: Nouvelle-Aquitaine
- Department: Pyrénées-Atlantiques
- Arrondissement: Pau
- Canton: Artix et Pays de Soubestre
- Intercommunality: Lacq-Orthez

Government
  - Mayor (2020–2026): Gérard Ducos
- Area^{1}: 9.49 km^{2} (3.66 sq mi)
- Elevation: 182 m (597 ft)
- Highest elevation: 252 m (827 ft)
- Lowest elevation: 124 m (407 ft)
- Population (2023): 581
  - Density: 61.2/km^{2} (159/sq mi)
- Time zone: UTC+01:00 (CET)
  - Summer (DST): UTC+02:00 (CEST)
- INSEE/Postal code: 64521 /64170
- ^{1} French Land Register data, which excludes lakes, ponds, glaciers > 1 km^{2} (0.386 sq mi or 247 acres) and river estuaries.

Serres-Sainte-Marie (French pronunciation: [sɛʁ sɛ̃t maʁi]; Occitan: Sèrra de Senta Maria) is a commune in the Pyrénées-Atlantiques department in south-western France.

== See also ==
- Communes of the Pyrénées-Atlantiques department
