= Doazon =

- Commune
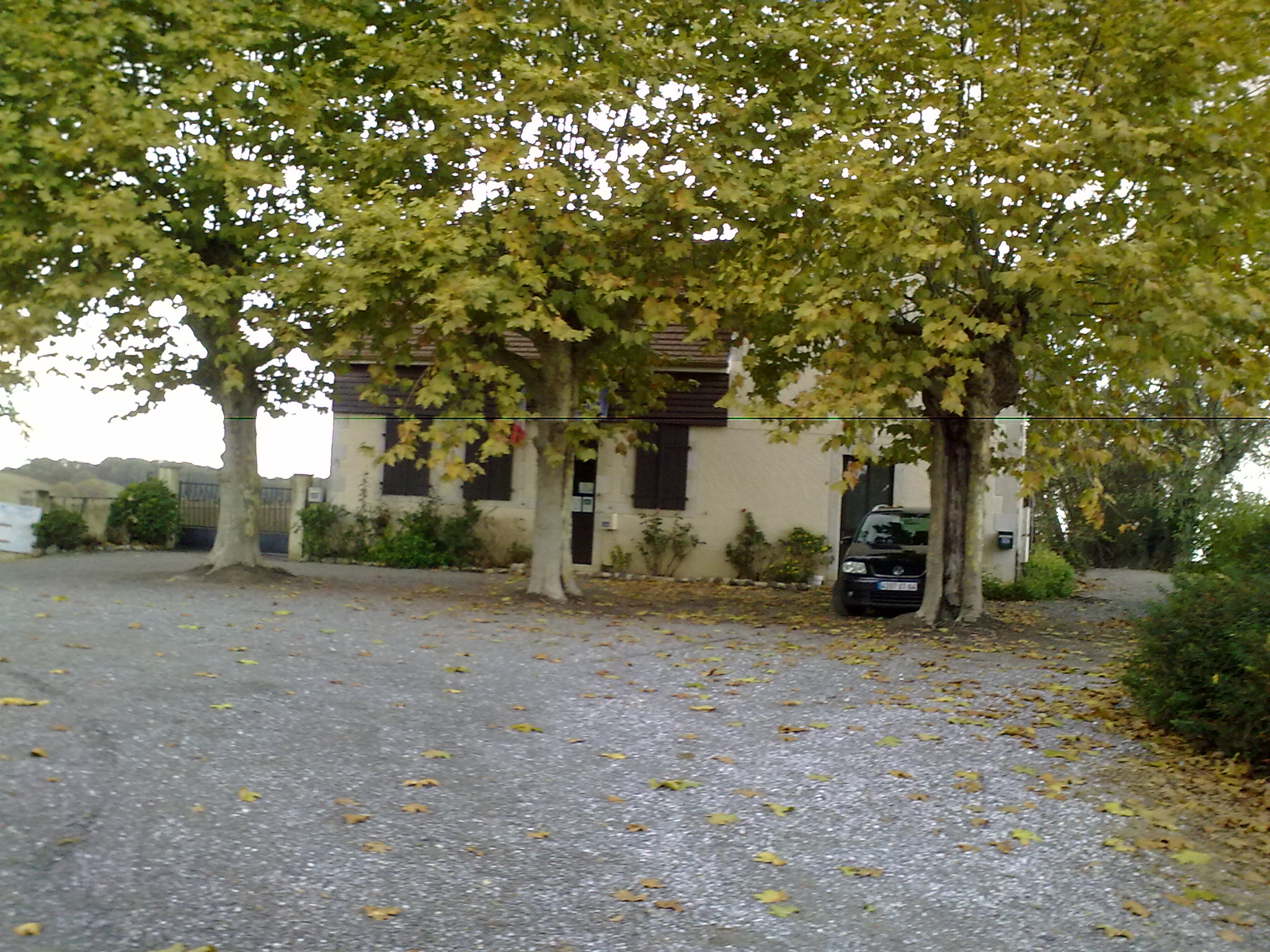
- The town hall of Doazon
- Location of Doazon
- Location within France Location within Nouvelle-Aquitaine
- Coordinates: 43°27′16″N 0°33′01″W
- Country: France
- Region: Nouvelle-Aquitaine
- Department: Pyrénées-Atlantiques
- Arrondissement: Pau
- Canton: Artix et Pays de Soubestre
- Intercommunality: Lacq-Orthez

Government
  - Mayor (2020–2026): Patrick Galopin
- Area^{1}: 6.14 km^{2} (2.37 sq mi)
- Elevation: 181 m (594 ft)
- Highest elevation: 248 m (814 ft)
- Lowest elevation: 129 m (423 ft)
- Population (2023): 187
  - Density: 30.5/km^{2} (78.9/sq mi)
- Time zone: UTC+01:00 (CET)
  - Summer (DST): UTC+02:00 (CEST)
- INSEE/Postal code: 64200 /64370
- ^{1} French Land Register data, which excludes lakes, ponds, glaciers > 1 km^{2} (0.386 sq mi or 247 acres) and river estuaries.

Doazon (French pronunciation: [dɔazɔ̃]; Occitan: Doason) is a commune located in the Pyrénées-Atlantiques department in south-western France.

== See also ==
- Communes of the Pyrénées-Atlantiques department
