= Bonnut =

- Commune
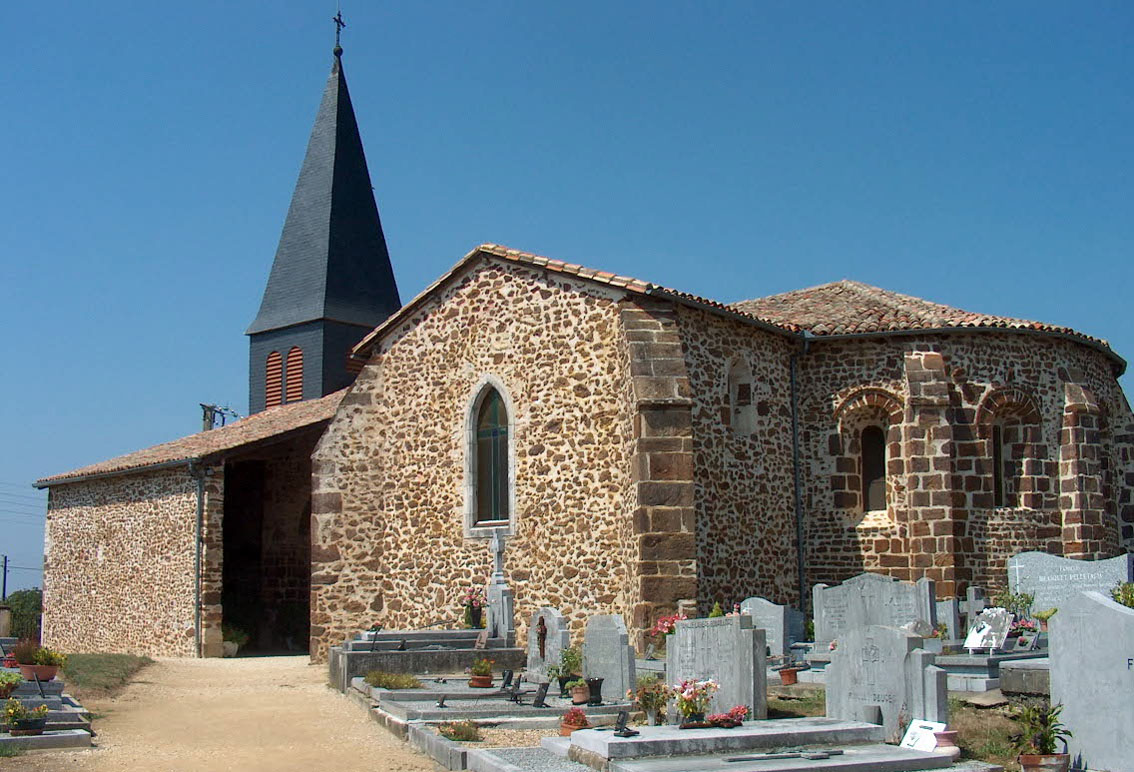
- The church of Sainte-Marie of Castèth
- Location of Bonnut
- Location within France Location within Nouvelle-Aquitaine
- Coordinates: 43°33′01″N 0°45′54″W
- Country: France
- Region: Nouvelle-Aquitaine
- Department: Pyrénées-Atlantiques
- Arrondissement: Pau
- Canton: Artix et Pays de Soubestre
- Intercommunality: Lacq-Orthez

Government
  - Mayor (2020–2026): Amandine Painset
- Area^{1}: 22.01 km^{2} (8.50 sq mi)
- Elevation: 129 m (423 ft)
- Highest elevation: 161 m (528 ft)
- Lowest elevation: 66 m (217 ft)
- Population (2023): 777
  - Density: 35.3/km^{2} (91.4/sq mi)
- Time zone: UTC+01:00 (CET)
  - Summer (DST): UTC+02:00 (CEST)
- INSEE/Postal code: 64135 /64300
- ^{1} French Land Register data, which excludes lakes, ponds, glaciers > 1 km^{2} (0.386 sq mi or 247 acres) and river estuaries.

Bonnut (French pronunciation: [bɔnyt]) is a commune in the Pyrénées-Atlantiques department in southwestern France. It is best known for the Château de Bonnut, the former residence of Henri Laborde, a general in Napoleon's army.

Inhabitants of Bonnut are called Bonnutiens in French.

== See also ==
- Communes of the Pyrénées-Atlantiques department
