= Viellenave-d'Arthez =

- Commune
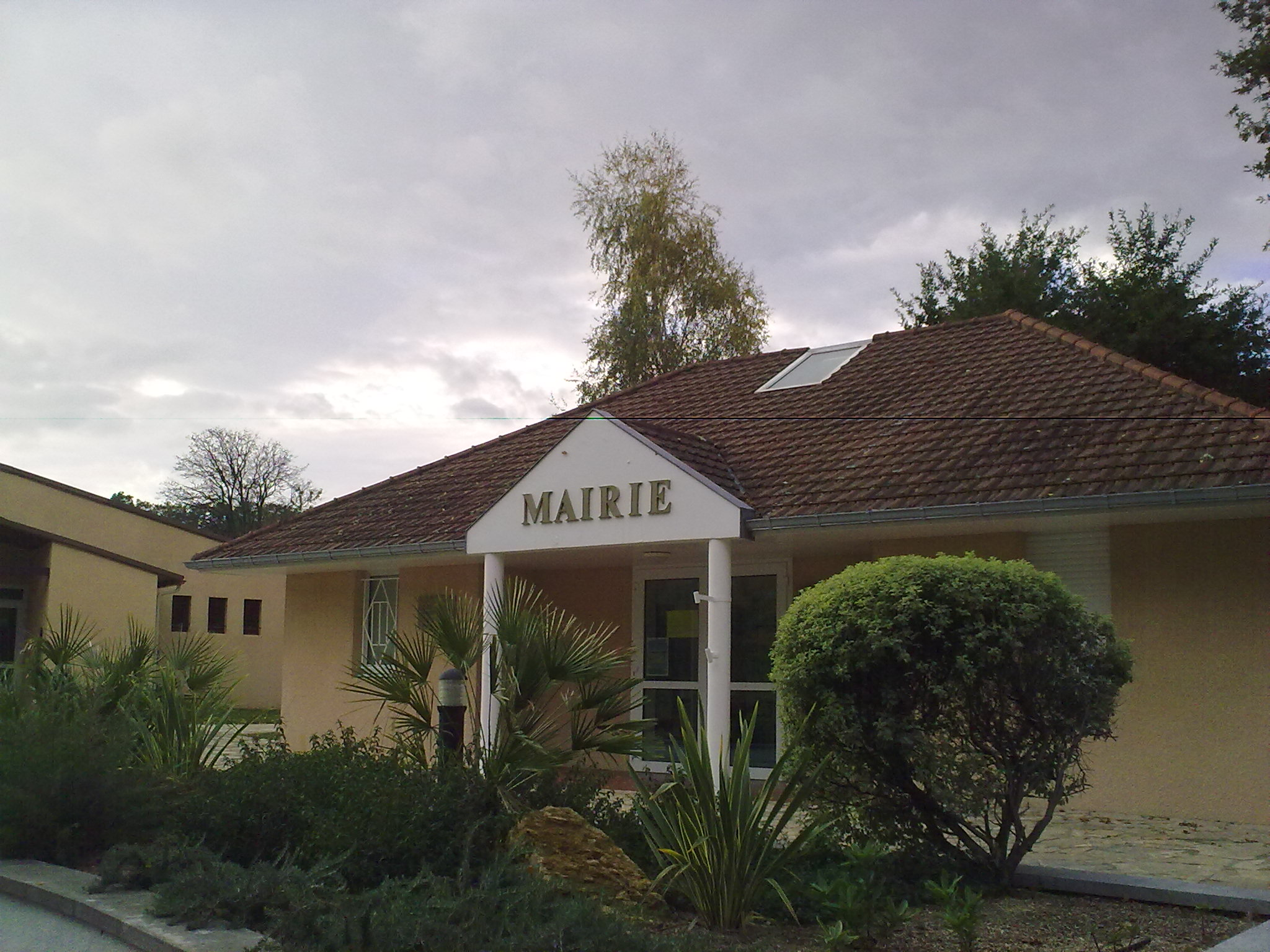
- Town hall
- Location of Viellenave-d'Arthez
- Location within France Location within Nouvelle-Aquitaine
- Coordinates: 43°25′N 0°29′W
- Country: France
- Region: Nouvelle-Aquitaine
- Department: Pyrénées-Atlantiques
- Arrondissement: Pau
- Canton: Artix et Pays de Soubestre
- Intercommunality: Lacq-Orthez

Government
  - Mayor (2020–2026): Thérèse Porlier
- Area^{1}: 3.92 km^{2} (1.51 sq mi)
- Highest elevation: 254 m (833 ft)
- Lowest elevation: 149 m (489 ft)
- Population (2023): 233
  - Density: 59.4/km^{2} (154/sq mi)
- Time zone: UTC+01:00 (CET)
  - Summer (DST): UTC+02:00 (CEST)
- INSEE/Postal code: 64554 /64170
- ^{1} French Land Register data, which excludes lakes, ponds, glaciers > 1 km^{2} (0.386 sq mi or 247 acres) and river estuaries.

Viellenave-d'Arthez (French pronunciation: [vjɛlnav daʁtɛz]; Occitan: Vièlanava d'Artés) is a commune in the Pyrénées-Atlantiques department in south-western France.

== See also ==
- Communes of the Pyrénées-Atlantiques department
