= Labastide-Cézéracq =

- Commune
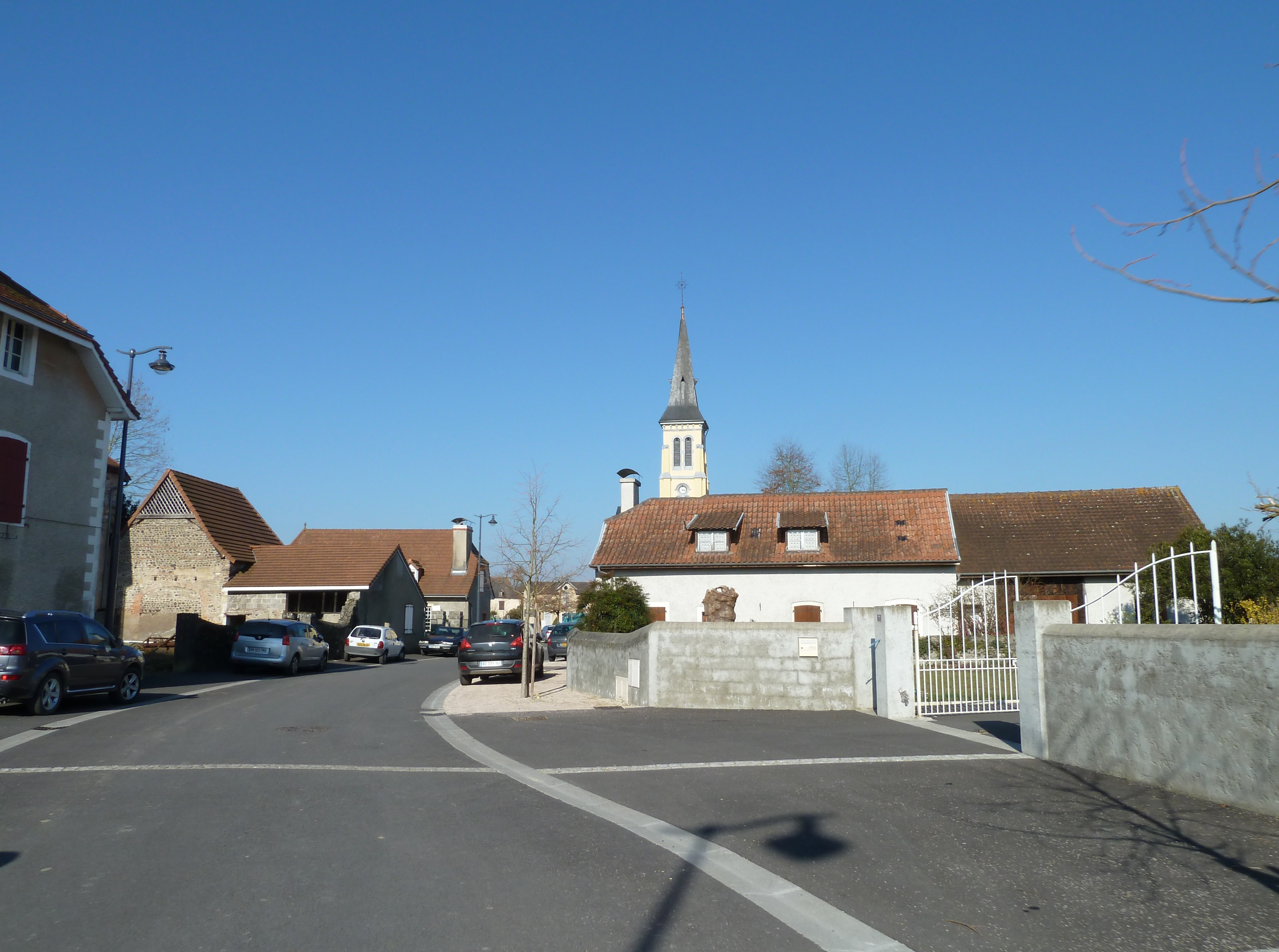
- A general view of Labastide-Cézéracq

- Coat of arms
- Location of Labastide-Cézéracq
- Location within France Location within Nouvelle-Aquitaine
- Coordinates: 43°22′41″N 0°32′16″W
- Country: France
- Region: Nouvelle-Aquitaine
- Department: Pyrénées-Atlantiques
- Arrondissement: Pau
- Canton: Artix et Pays de Soubestre
- Intercommunality: Lacq-Orthez

Government
  - Mayor (2020–2026): Hervé Darette
- Area^{1}: 5.01 km^{2} (1.93 sq mi)
- Elevation: 143 m (469 ft)
- Highest elevation: 128 m (420 ft)
- Lowest elevation: 106 m (348 ft)
- Population (2023): 584
  - Density: 117/km^{2} (302/sq mi)
- Time zone: UTC+01:00 (CET)
  - Summer (DST): UTC+02:00 (CEST)
- INSEE/Postal code: 64288 /64170
- ^{1} French Land Register data, which excludes lakes, ponds, glaciers > 1 km^{2} (0.386 sq mi or 247 acres) and river estuaries.

Labastide-Cézéracq (French pronunciation: [labastid sezeʁak]; Occitan: Ceserac) is a commune in the Pyrénées-Atlantiques department in south-western France.

== See also ==
- Communes of the Pyrénées-Atlantiques department
