= Canton of Artix et Pays de Soubestre =

Coordinates: 43.40°N 0.57°W

The canton of Artix et Pays de Soubestre is an administrative division of the Pyrénées-Atlantiques department, southwestern France. It was created at the French canton reorganisation which came into effect in March 2015. Its seat is in Artix.

It consists of the following communes:

1. Argagnon
2. Arget
3. Arnos
4. Arthez-de-Béarn
5. Artix
6. Arzacq-Arraziguet
7. Aussevielle
8. Balansun
9. Beyrie-en-Béarn
10. Bonnut
11. Bougarber
12. Bouillon
13. Boumourt
14. Cabidos
15. Casteide-Cami
16. Casteide-Candau
17. Castétis
18. Castillon
19. Cescau
20. Coublucq
21. Denguin
22. Doazon
23. Fichous-Riumayou
24. Garos
25. Géus-d'Arzacq
26. Hagetaubin
27. Labastide-Cézéracq
28. Labastide-Monréjeau
29. Labeyrie
30. Lacadée
31. Lacq
32. Larreule
33. Lonçon
34. Louvigny
35. Malaussanne
36. Mazerolles
37. Méracq
38. Mesplède
39. Mialos
40. Momas
41. Mont
42. Montagut
43. Morlanne
44. Piets-Plasence-Moustrou
45. Pomps
46. Poursiugues-Boucoue
47. Saint-Médard
48. Sallespisse
49. Sault-de-Navailles
50. Séby
51. Serres-Sainte-Marie
52. Uzan
53. Viellenave-d'Arthez
54. Vignes
