= Casteide-Cami =

- Commune
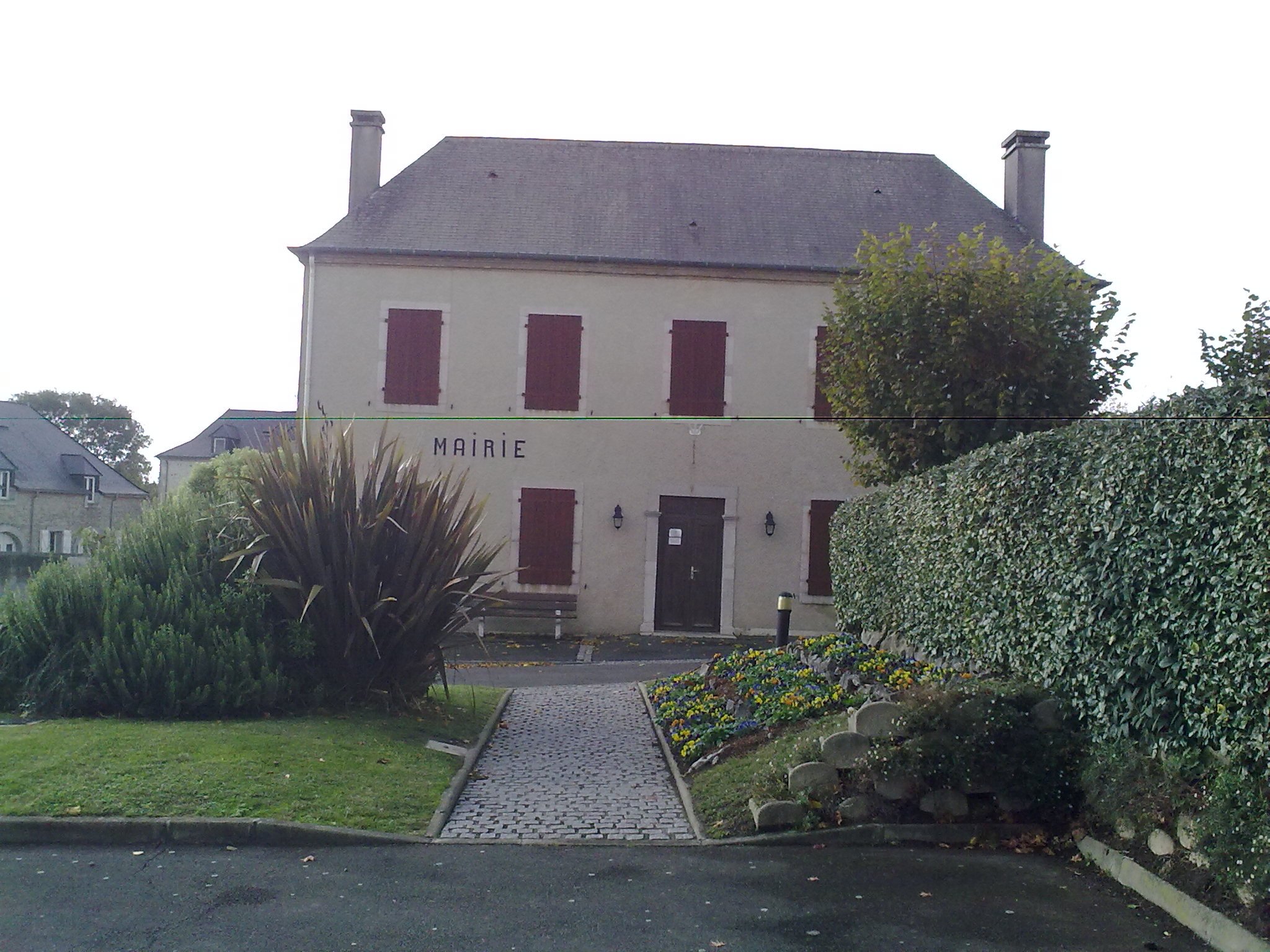
- The town hall of Casteide-Cami
- Location of Casteide-Cami
- Location within France Location within Nouvelle-Aquitaine
- Coordinates: 43°25′28″N 0°31′06″W
- Country: France
- Region: Nouvelle-Aquitaine
- Department: Pyrénées-Atlantiques
- Arrondissement: Pau
- Canton: Artix et Pays de Soubestre
- Intercommunality: Lacq-Orthez

Government
  - Mayor (2020–2026): Maryse Paybou
- Area^{1}: 6.80 km^{2} (2.63 sq mi)
- Elevation: 248 m (814 ft)
- Highest elevation: 262 m (860 ft)
- Lowest elevation: 150 m (490 ft)
- Population (2023): 274
  - Density: 40.3/km^{2} (104/sq mi)
- Time zone: UTC+01:00 (CET)
  - Summer (DST): UTC+02:00 (CEST)
- INSEE/Postal code: 64171 /64170
- ^{1} French Land Register data, which excludes lakes, ponds, glaciers > 1 km^{2} (0.386 sq mi or 247 acres) and river estuaries.

Casteide-Cami (French pronunciation: [kastɛd kami]; Occitan: Castèida deu Camin) is a commune in the Pyrénées-Atlantiques department in south-western France.

== See also ==
- Communes of the Pyrénées-Atlantiques department
