= Piets-Plasence-Moustrou =

- Commune
- Location of Piets-Plasence-Moustrou
- Location within France Location within Nouvelle-Aquitaine
- Coordinates: 43°31′31″N 0°30′06″W
- Country: France
- Region: Nouvelle-Aquitaine
- Department: Pyrénées-Atlantiques
- Arrondissement: Pau
- Canton: Artix et Pays de Soubestre
- Intercommunality: Luys en Béarn

Government
  - Mayor (2020–2026): Éric Duplaa
- Area^{1}: 8.34 km^{2} (3.22 sq mi)
- Elevation: 147 m (482 ft)
- Highest elevation: 215 m (705 ft)
- Lowest elevation: 82 m (269 ft)
- Population (2023): 133
  - Density: 15.9/km^{2} (41.3/sq mi)
- Time zone: UTC+01:00 (CET)
  - Summer (DST): UTC+02:00 (CEST)
- INSEE/Postal code: 64447 /64410
- ^{1} French Land Register data, which excludes lakes, ponds, glaciers > 1 km^{2} (0.386 sq mi or 247 acres) and river estuaries.

Piets-Plasence-Moustrou (Occitan: Plasença) is a commune in the Pyrénées-Atlantiques department in south-western France.

== See also ==
- Communes of the Pyrénées-Atlantiques department
