= Cescau, Pyrénées-Atlantiques =

Administrative division in Nouvelle-Aquitaine, France

Cescau
- Commune
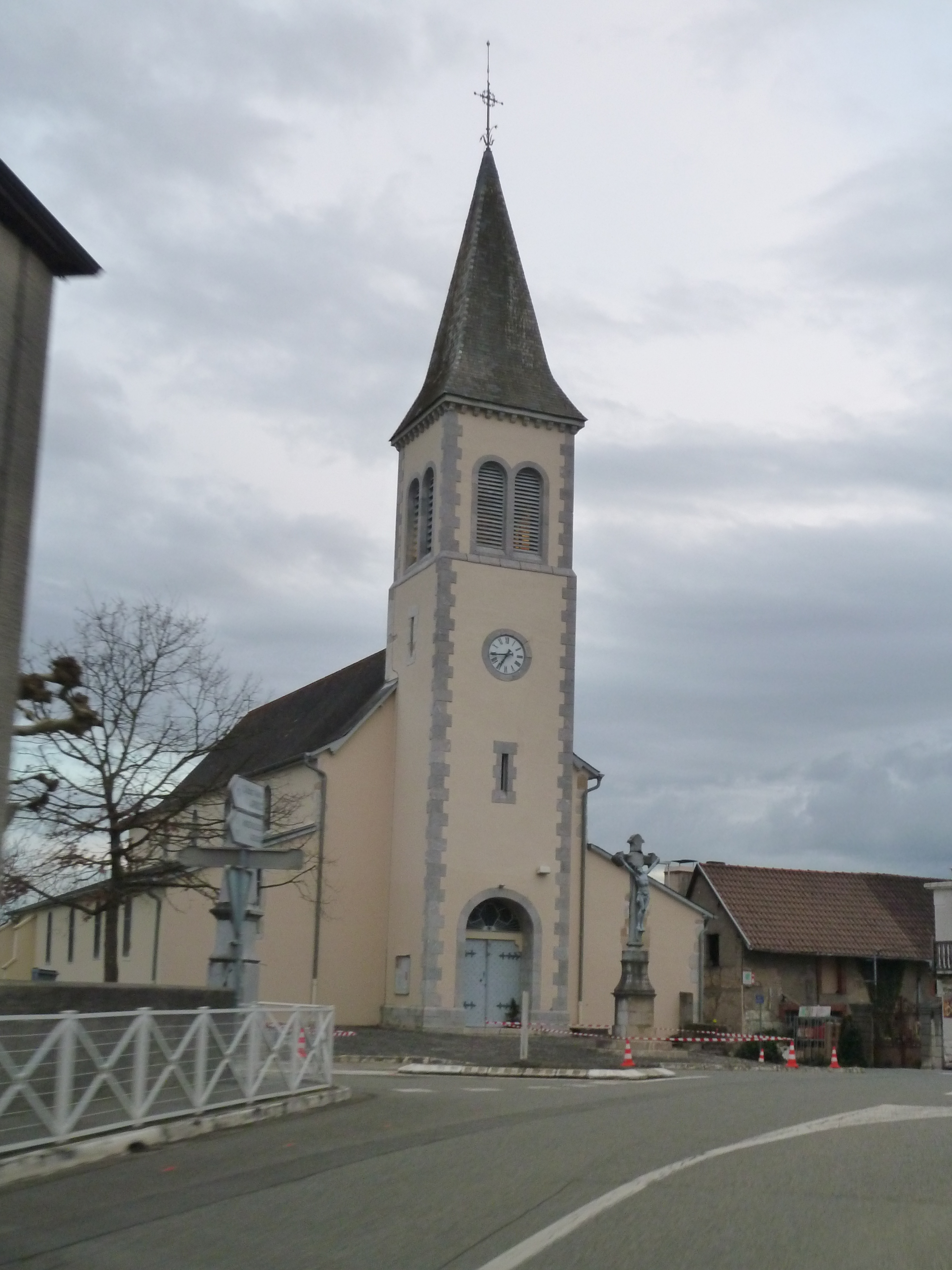
- The church of Cescau
- Location of Cescau
- Location within France Location within Nouvelle-Aquitaine
- Coordinates: 43°24′41″N 0°29′57″W
- Country: France
- Region: Nouvelle-Aquitaine
- Department: Pyrénées-Atlantiques
- Arrondissement: Pau
- Canton: Artix et Pays de Soubestre
- Intercommunality: Lacq-Orthez

Government
  - Mayor (2020–2026): Jean-Hervé Lafitte
- Area^{1}: 7.98 km^{2} (3.08 sq mi)
- Elevation: 164 m (538 ft)
- Highest elevation: 268 m (879 ft)
- Lowest elevation: 149 m (489 ft)
- Population (2023): 630
  - Density: 79/km^{2} (200/sq mi)
- Time zone: UTC+01:00 (CET)
  - Summer (DST): UTC+02:00 (CEST)
- INSEE/Postal code: 64184 /64170
- ^{1} French Land Register data, which excludes lakes, ponds, glaciers > 1 km^{2} (0.386 sq mi or 247 acres) and river estuaries.

Cescau (French pronunciation: [sɛsko]; Occitan: Sescau) is a commune in the Pyrénées-Atlantiques department in south-western France.

== See also ==
- Communes of the Pyrénées-Atlantiques department
