= Labeyrie, Pyrénées-Atlantiques =

Labeyrie
- Commune
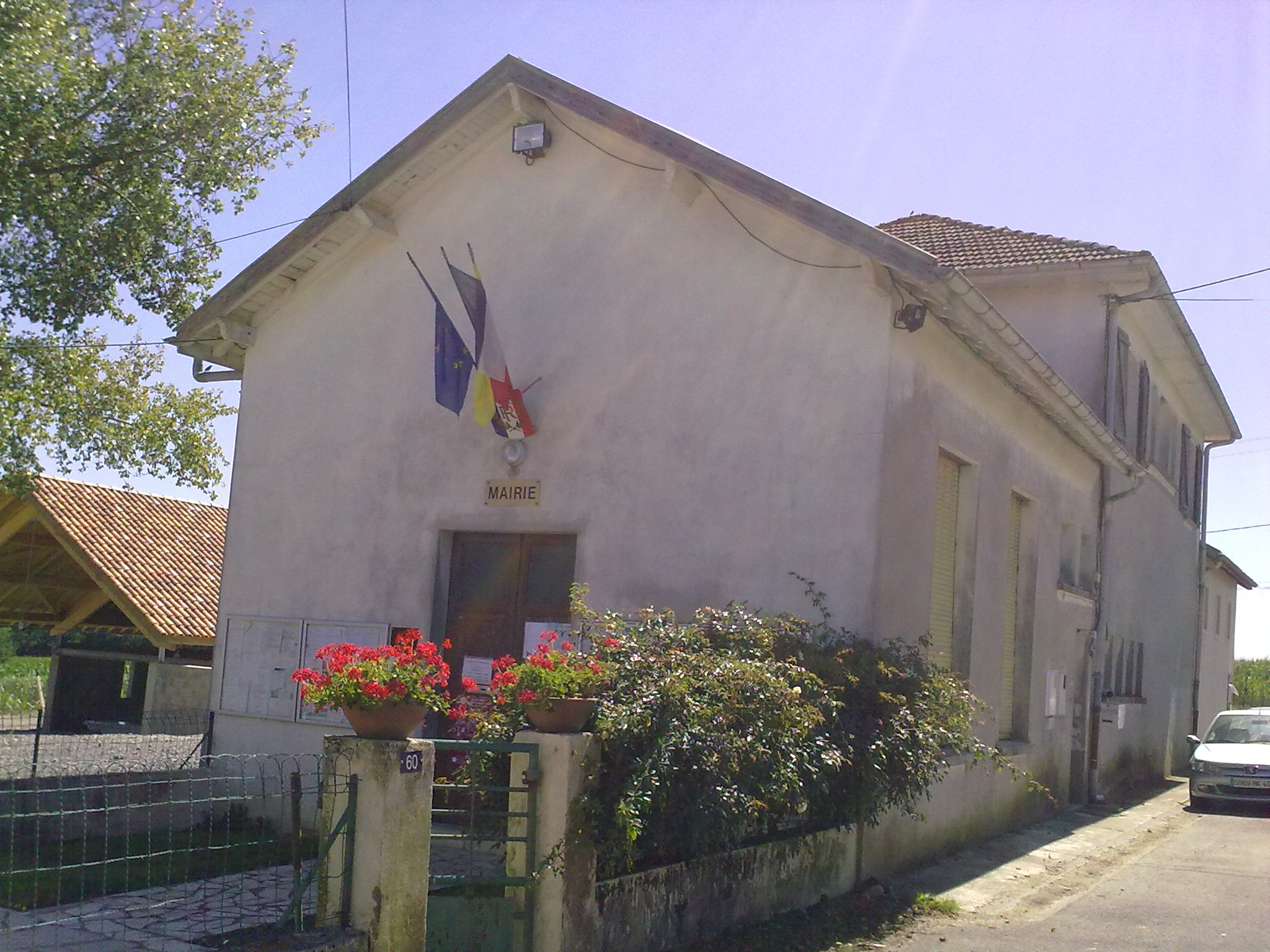
- The town hall of Labeyrie
- Location of Labeyrie
- Location within France Location within Nouvelle-Aquitaine
- Coordinates: 43°32′33″N 0°37′11″W
- Country: France
- Region: Nouvelle-Aquitaine
- Department: Pyrénées-Atlantiques
- Arrondissement: Pau
- Canton: Artix et Pays de Soubestre
- Intercommunality: Lacq-Orthez

Government
  - Mayor (2020–2026): Laurent Coublucq
- Area^{1}: 3.69 km^{2} (1.42 sq mi)
- Elevation: 76 m (249 ft)
- Highest elevation: 157 m (515 ft)
- Lowest elevation: 63 m (207 ft)
- Population (2023): 103
  - Density: 27.9/km^{2} (72.3/sq mi)
- Time zone: UTC+01:00 (CET)
  - Summer (DST): UTC+02:00 (CEST)
- INSEE/Postal code: 64295 /64300
- ^{1} French Land Register data, which excludes lakes, ponds, glaciers > 1 km^{2} (0.386 sq mi or 247 acres) and river estuaries.

Labeyrie (French pronunciation: [labeʁi]; Occitan: La Veiria) is a commune in the Pyrénées-Atlantiques department in south-western France.

== See also ==
- Communes of the Pyrénées-Atlantiques department
