= Saint-Médard, Pyrénées-Atlantiques =

Saint-Médard
- Commune
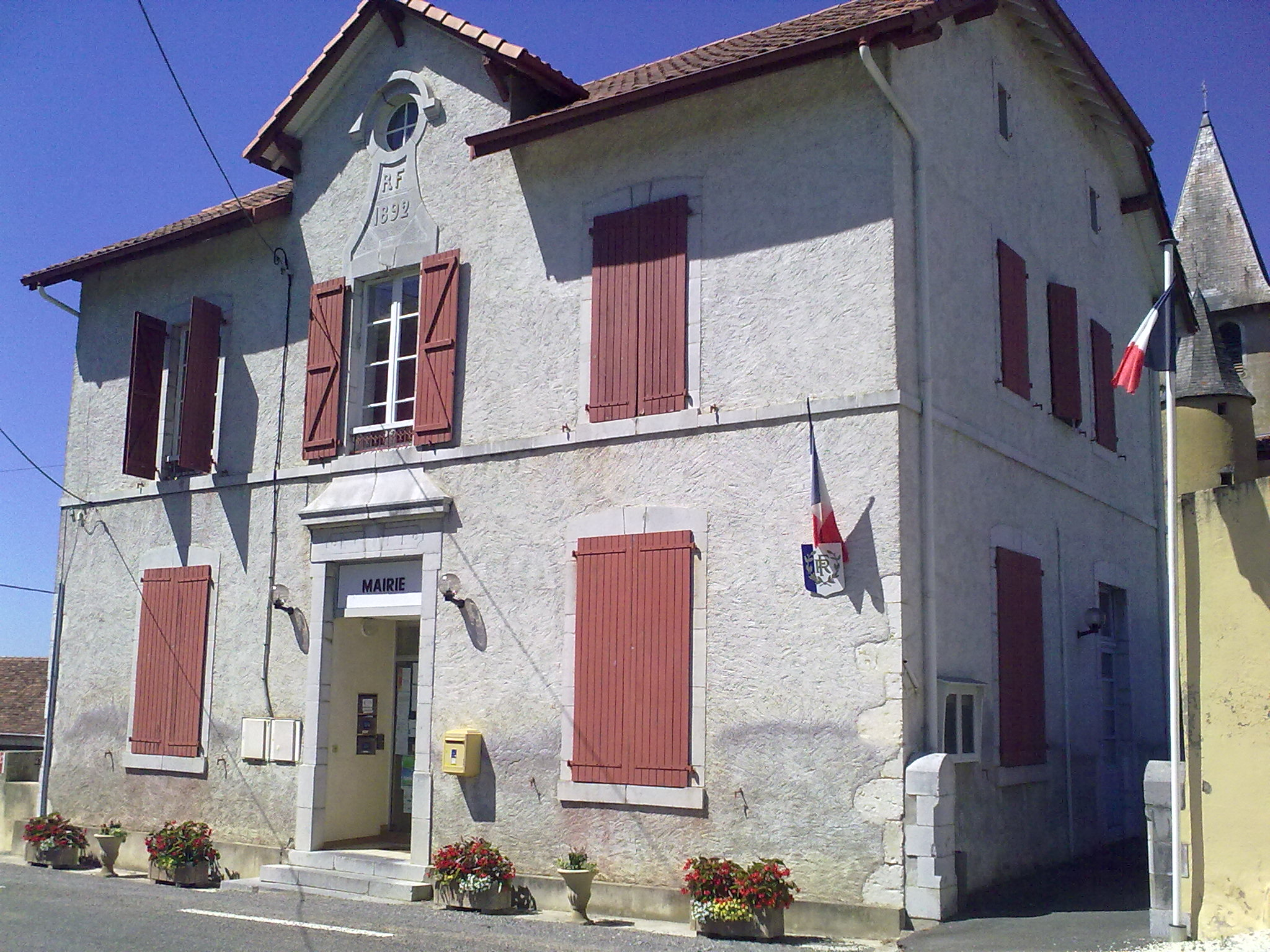
- The town hall of Saint-Médard
- Location of Saint-Médard
- Location within France Location within Nouvelle-Aquitaine
- Coordinates: 43°31′51″N 0°35′22″W
- Country: France
- Region: Nouvelle-Aquitaine
- Department: Pyrénées-Atlantiques
- Arrondissement: Pau
- Canton: Artix et Pays de Soubestre
- Intercommunality: Lacq-Orthez

Government
  - Mayor (2020–2026): Jérôme Lay
- Area^{1}: 11.23 km^{2} (4.34 sq mi)
- Elevation: 159 m (522 ft)
- Highest elevation: 178 m (584 ft)
- Lowest elevation: 69 m (226 ft)
- Population (2023): 206
  - Density: 18.3/km^{2} (47.5/sq mi)
- Time zone: UTC+01:00 (CET)
  - Summer (DST): UTC+02:00 (CEST)
- INSEE/Postal code: 64491 /64370
- ^{1} French Land Register data, which excludes lakes, ponds, glaciers > 1 km^{2} (0.386 sq mi or 247 acres) and river estuaries.

Saint-Médard (French pronunciation: [sɛ̃ medaʁ]; Gascon: Sent Medard) is a commune in the Pyrénées-Atlantiques department, in south-western France.

== See also ==
- Communes of the Pyrénées-Atlantiques department
