= Méracq =

- Commune
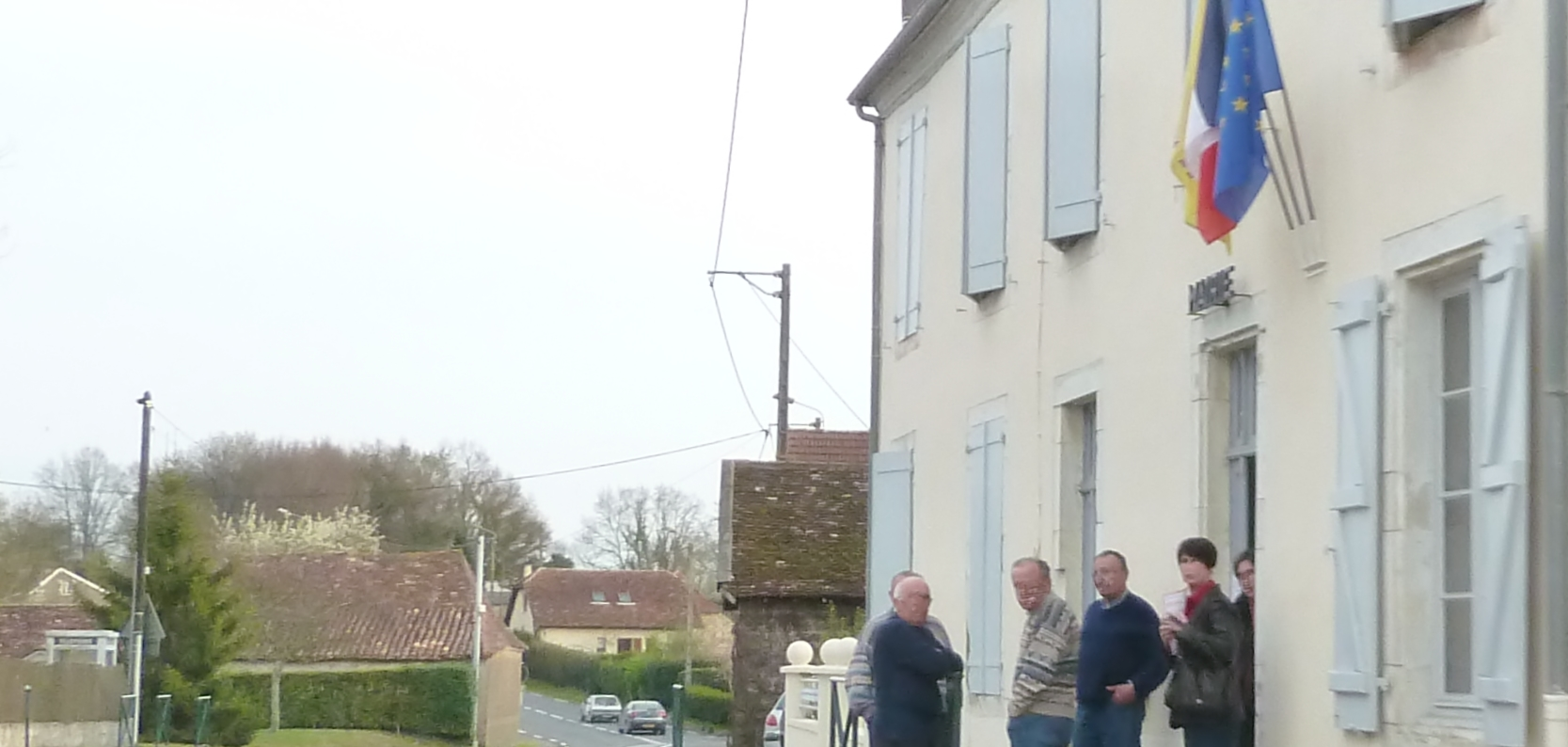
- The town hall of Méracq
- Location of Méracq
- Location within France Location within Nouvelle-Aquitaine
- Coordinates: 43°30′32″N 0°23′10″W
- Country: France
- Region: Nouvelle-Aquitaine
- Department: Pyrénées-Atlantiques
- Arrondissement: Pau
- Canton: Artix et Pays de Soubestre
- Intercommunality: Luys en Béarn

Government
  - Mayor (2020–2026): Pierre Duplantier
- Area^{1}: 8.24 km^{2} (3.18 sq mi)
- Elevation: 197 m (646 ft)
- Highest elevation: 245 m (804 ft)
- Lowest elevation: 109 m (358 ft)
- Population (2023): 234
  - Density: 28.4/km^{2} (73.6/sq mi)
- Time zone: UTC+01:00 (CET)
  - Summer (DST): UTC+02:00 (CEST)
- INSEE/Postal code: 64380 /64410
- ^{1} French Land Register data, which excludes lakes, ponds, glaciers > 1 km^{2} (0.386 sq mi or 247 acres) and river estuaries.

Méracq (French pronunciation: [meʁak]; Occitan: L'Omerac) is a commune in the Pyrénées-Atlantiques département in south-western France.

== Name ==
Historically, Méracq has been recorded as Meirac (13th century), Honerac (1538), Lo Merac (1546) and Louméracq (1863).

Its name in Gascon is L'Oumerac.

== See also ==
- Communes of the Pyrénées-Atlantiques department
