= Vignes, Pyrénées-Atlantiques =

Vignes
- Commune
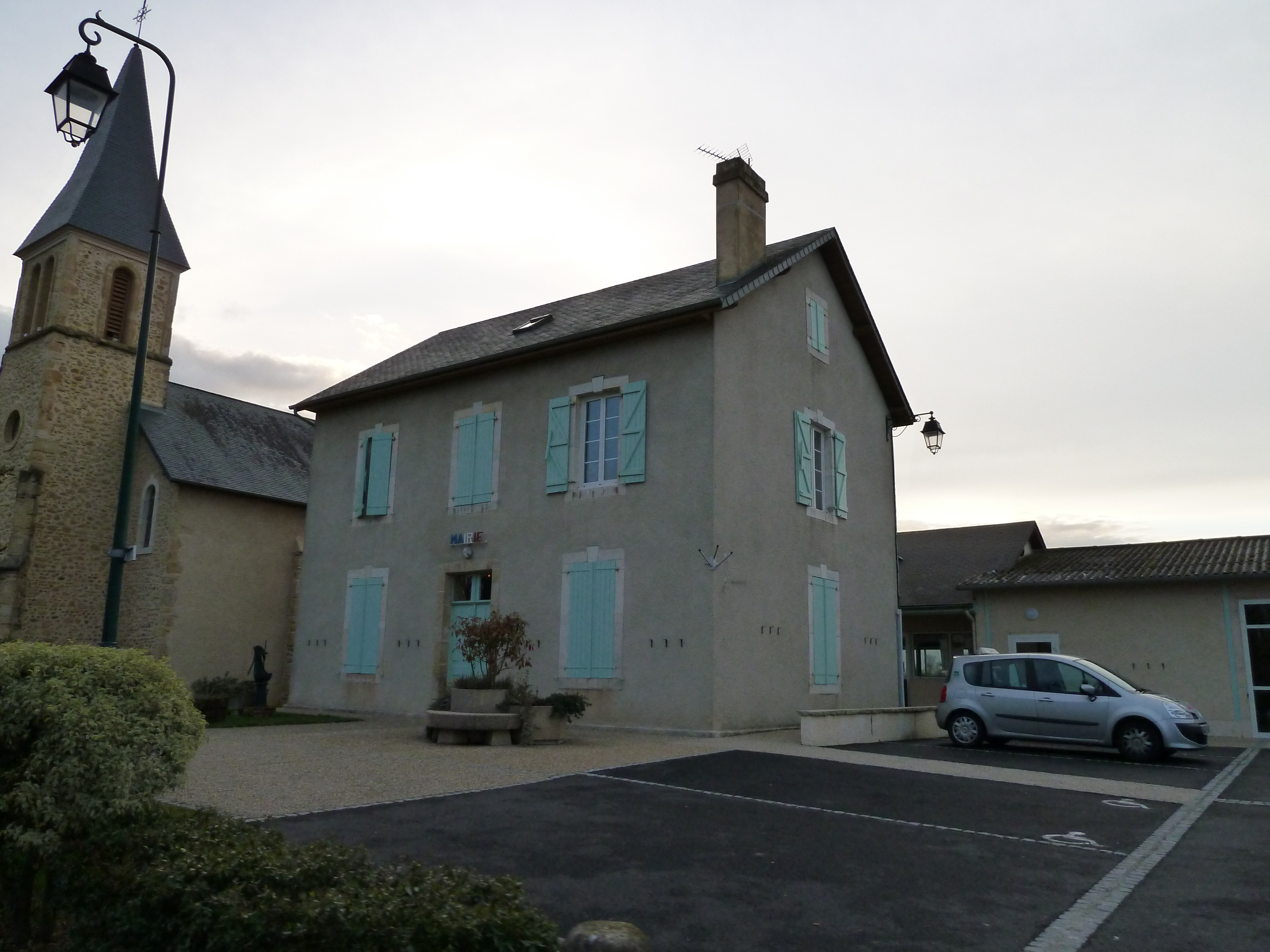
- The town hall of Vignes
- Location of Vignes
- Location within France Location within Nouvelle-Aquitaine
- Coordinates: 43°31′37″N 0°24′40″W
- Country: France
- Region: Nouvelle-Aquitaine
- Department: Pyrénées-Atlantiques
- Arrondissement: Pau
- Canton: Artix et Pays de Soubestre
- Intercommunality: Luys en Béarn

Government
  - Mayor (2020–2026): Gilles Picard
- Area^{1}: 7.97 km^{2} (3.08 sq mi)
- Highest elevation: 243 m (797 ft)
- Lowest elevation: 102 m (335 ft)
- Population (2023): 463
  - Density: 58.1/km^{2} (150/sq mi)
- Time zone: UTC+01:00 (CET)
  - Summer (DST): UTC+02:00 (CEST)
- INSEE/Postal code: 64557 /64410
- ^{1} French Land Register data, which excludes lakes, ponds, glaciers > 1 km^{2} (0.386 sq mi or 247 acres) and river estuaries.

Vignes (French pronunciation: [viɲ]; Occitan: Vinhas) is a commune in the Pyrénées-Atlantiques department in south-western France.

== See also ==
- Communes of the Pyrénées-Atlantiques department
