= Lacadée =

- Commune
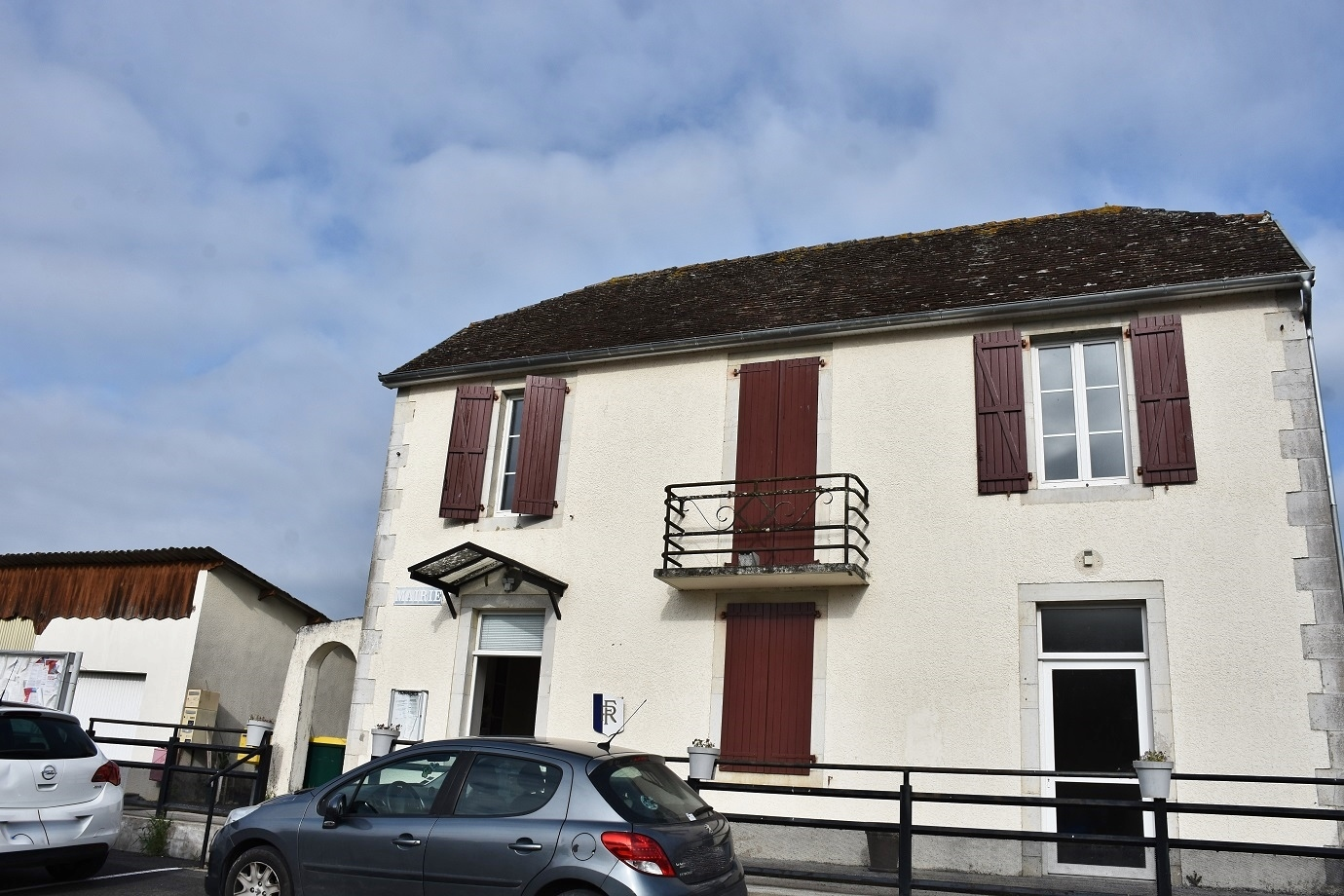
- Lacadée Town hall
- Location of Lacadée
- Location within France Location within Nouvelle-Aquitaine
- Coordinates: 43°32′18″N 0°38′59″W
- Country: France
- Region: Nouvelle-Aquitaine
- Department: Pyrénées-Atlantiques
- Arrondissement: Pau
- Canton: Artix et Pays de Soubestre
- Intercommunality: Lacq-Orthez

Government
  - Mayor (2020–2026): Marie-Christine Lupiet
- Area^{1}: 4.81 km^{2} (1.86 sq mi)
- Elevation: 89 m (292 ft)
- Highest elevation: 110 m (360 ft)
- Lowest elevation: 60 m (200 ft)
- Population (2023): 145
  - Density: 30.1/km^{2} (78.1/sq mi)
- Time zone: UTC+01:00 (CET)
  - Summer (DST): UTC+02:00 (CEST)
- INSEE/Postal code: 64296 /64300
- ^{1} French Land Register data, which excludes lakes, ponds, glaciers > 1 km^{2} (0.386 sq mi or 247 acres) and river estuaries.

Lacadée (French pronunciation: [lakade]; Occitan: La Cadea) is a commune in the Pyrénées-Atlantiques department in south-western France.

== See also ==
- Communes of the Pyrénées-Atlantiques department
