= Coublucq =

- Commune
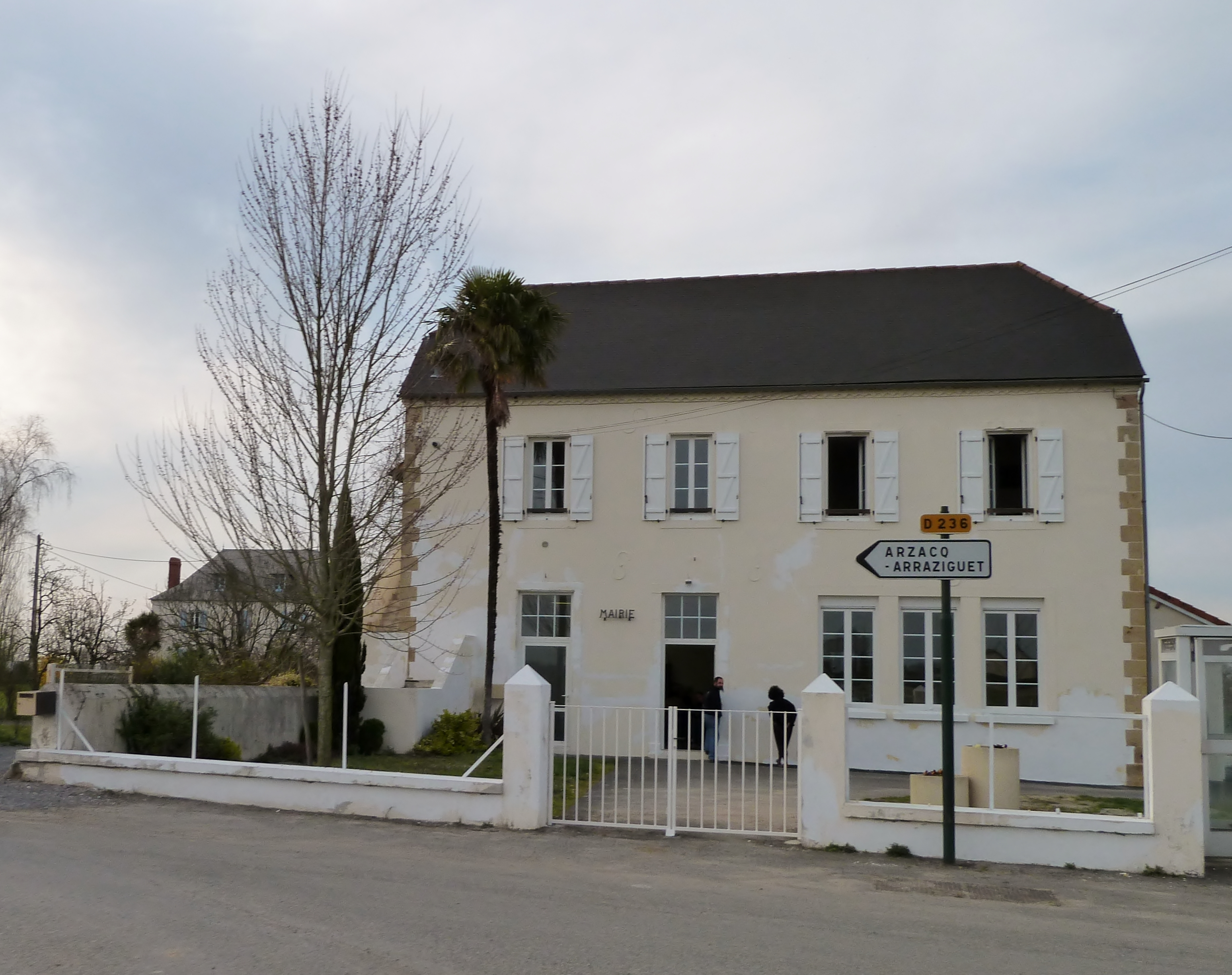
- The town hall of Coublucq
- Location of Coublucq
- Location within France Location within Nouvelle-Aquitaine
- Coordinates: 43°31′59″N 0°21′48″W
- Country: France
- Region: Nouvelle-Aquitaine
- Department: Pyrénées-Atlantiques
- Arrondissement: Pau
- Canton: Artix et Pays de Soubestre
- Intercommunality: Luys en Béarn

Government
  - Mayor (2020–2026): Jean-Yves Dupont-Brethes
- Area^{1}: 5.54 km^{2} (2.14 sq mi)
- Elevation: 200 m (660 ft)
- Highest elevation: 202 m (663 ft)
- Lowest elevation: 118 m (387 ft)
- Population (2023): 92
  - Density: 17/km^{2} (43/sq mi)
- Time zone: UTC+01:00 (CET)
  - Summer (DST): UTC+02:00 (CEST)
- INSEE/Postal code: 64195 /64410
- ^{1} French Land Register data, which excludes lakes, ponds, glaciers > 1 km^{2} (0.386 sq mi or 247 acres) and river estuaries.

Coublucq (French pronunciation: [kublyk]; Occitan: Cobluc) is a commune to the north of Béarn in the Pyrénées-Atlantiques department in south-western France.

== See also ==
- Communes of the Pyrénées-Atlantiques department
