= Louvigny, Pyrénées-Atlantiques =

Louvigny
- Commune
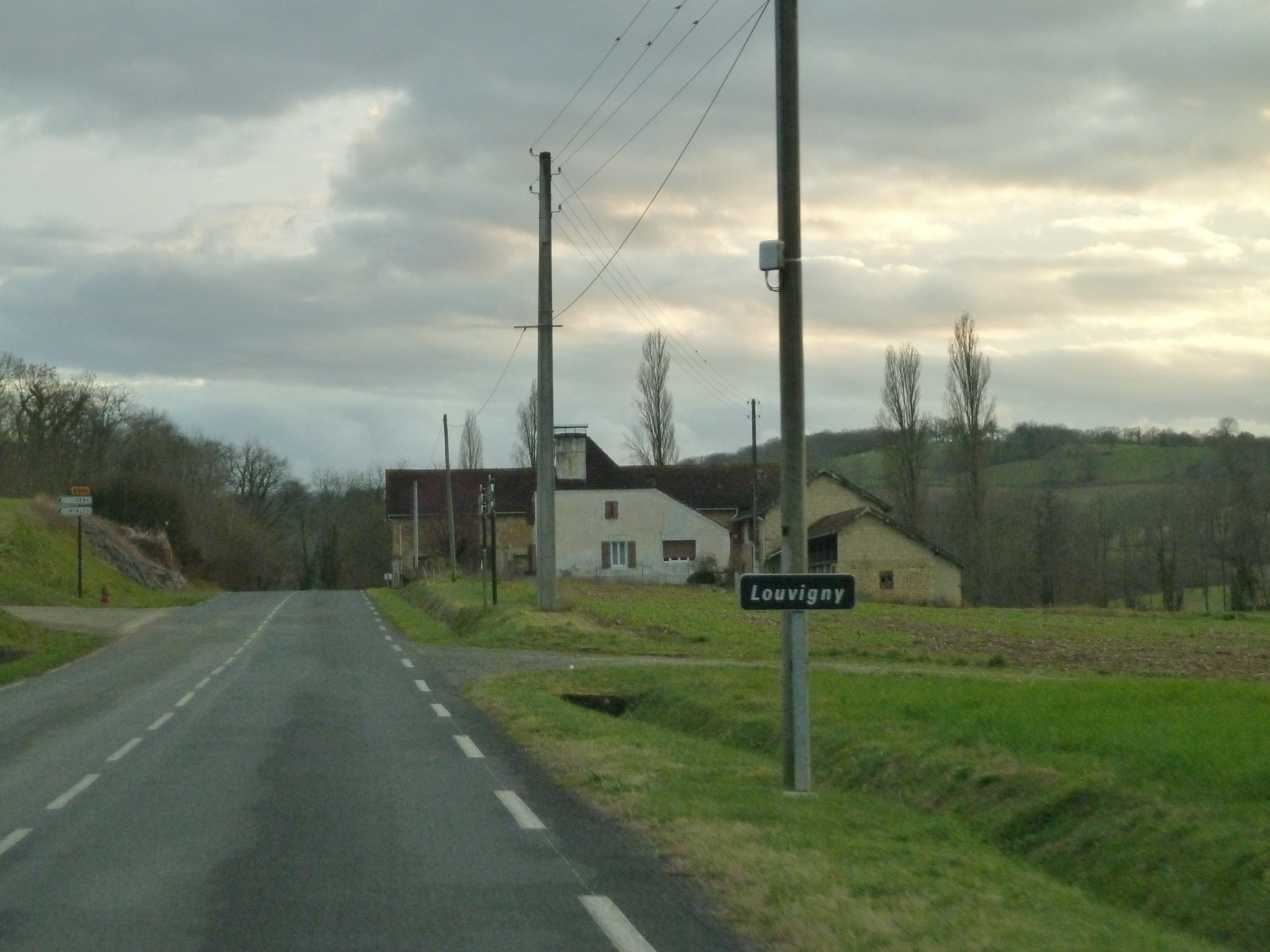
- The road into Louvigny
- Location of Louvigny
- Location within France Location within Nouvelle-Aquitaine
- Coordinates: 43°30′46″N 0°26′32″W
- Country: France
- Region: Nouvelle-Aquitaine
- Department: Pyrénées-Atlantiques
- Arrondissement: Pau
- Canton: Artix et Pays de Soubestre
- Intercommunality: Luys en Béarn

Government
  - Mayor (2020–2026): Anita Vergoin
- Area^{1}: 7.02 km^{2} (2.71 sq mi)
- Elevation: 174 m (571 ft)
- Highest elevation: 239 m (784 ft)
- Lowest elevation: 97 m (318 ft)
- Population (2023): 139
  - Density: 19.8/km^{2} (51.3/sq mi)
- Time zone: UTC+01:00 (CET)
  - Summer (DST): UTC+02:00 (CEST)
- INSEE/Postal code: 64355 /64410
- ^{1} French Land Register data, which excludes lakes, ponds, glaciers > 1 km^{2} (0.386 sq mi or 247 acres) and river estuaries.

Louvigny (French pronunciation: [luviɲi]) is a commune in the Pyrénées-Atlantiques department in south-western France.

== See also ==
- Communes of the Pyrénées-Atlantiques department
