= Boumourt =

- Commune
- Location of Boumourt
- Location within France Location within Nouvelle-Aquitaine
- Coordinates: 43°26′40″N 0°31′13″W
- Country: France
- Region: Nouvelle-Aquitaine
- Department: Pyrénées-Atlantiques
- Arrondissement: Pau
- Canton: Artix et Pays de Soubestre

Government
  - Mayor (2020–2026): Jean-Bernard Prat
- Area^{1}: 8.03 km^{2} (3.10 sq mi)
- Elevation: 224 m (735 ft)
- Highest elevation: 246 m (807 ft)
- Lowest elevation: 134 m (440 ft)
- Population (2023): 151
  - Density: 18.8/km^{2} (48.7/sq mi)
- Time zone: UTC+01:00 (CET)
  - Summer (DST): UTC+02:00 (CEST)
- INSEE/Postal code: 64144 /64370
- ^{1} French Land Register data, which excludes lakes, ponds, glaciers > 1 km^{2} (0.386 sq mi or 247 acres) and river estuaries.

Boumourt (French pronunciation: [bumuʁ]; Occitan: Bomort) is a commune in the Pyrénées-Atlantiques department in southwestern France.

== See also ==
- Communes of the Pyrénées-Atlantiques department
