= Mialos =

- Commune
- Location of Mialos
- Location within France Location within Nouvelle-Aquitaine
- Coordinates: 43°29′43″N 0°24′27″W
- Country: France
- Region: Nouvelle-Aquitaine
- Department: Pyrénées-Atlantiques
- Arrondissement: Pau
- Canton: Artix et Pays de Soubestre
- Intercommunality: Luys en Béarn

Government
  - Mayor (2020–2026): Didier Darribère
- Area^{1}: 4.54 km^{2} (1.75 sq mi)
- Elevation: 143 m (469 ft)
- Highest elevation: 244 m (801 ft)
- Lowest elevation: 109 m (358 ft)
- Population (2023): 142
  - Density: 31.3/km^{2} (81.0/sq mi)
- Time zone: UTC+01:00 (CET)
  - Summer (DST): UTC+02:00 (CEST)
- INSEE/Postal code: 64383 /64410
- ^{1} French Land Register data, which excludes lakes, ponds, glaciers > 1 km^{2} (0.386 sq mi or 247 acres) and river estuaries.

Mialos (French pronunciation: [mjalɔs]; Occitan: Mialòs) is a commune in the Pyrénées-Atlantiques department in south-western France.

== See also ==
- Communes of the Pyrénées-Atlantiques department
