= Mesplède =

- Commune
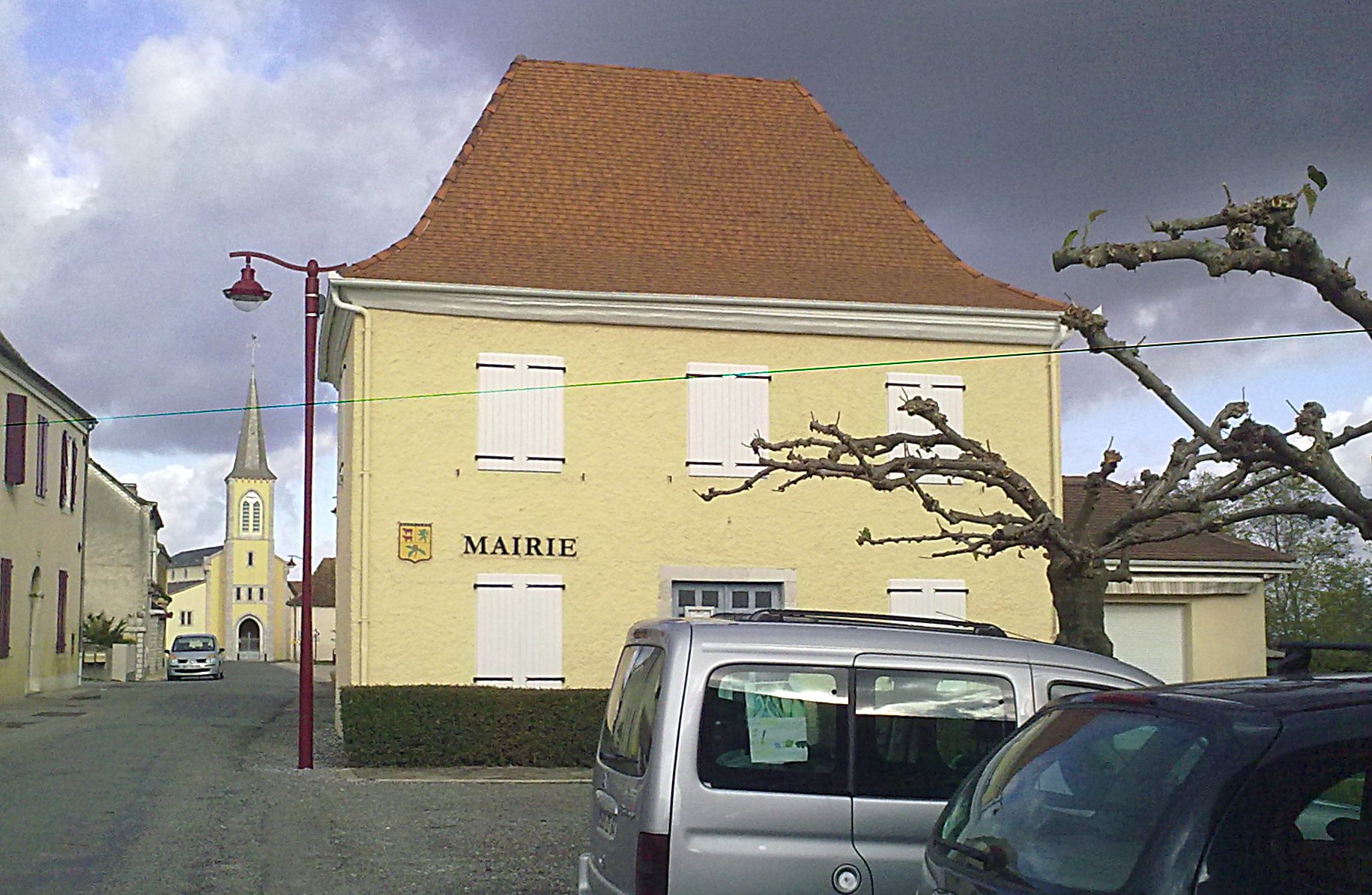
- The town hall of Mesplède

- Coat of arms
- Location of Mesplède
- Location within France Location within Nouvelle-Aquitaine
- Coordinates: 43°29′41″N 0°39′30″W
- Country: France
- Region: Nouvelle-Aquitaine
- Department: Pyrénées-Atlantiques
- Arrondissement: Pau
- Canton: Artix et Pays de Soubestre
- Intercommunality: Lacq-Orthez

Government
  - Mayor (2020–2026): Régis Cassaroumé
- Area^{1}: 11.47 km^{2} (4.43 sq mi)
- Elevation: 181 m (594 ft)
- Highest elevation: 210 m (690 ft)
- Lowest elevation: 100 m (330 ft)
- Population (2023): 325
  - Density: 28.3/km^{2} (73.4/sq mi)
- Time zone: UTC+01:00 (CET)
  - Summer (DST): UTC+02:00 (CEST)
- INSEE/Postal code: 64382 /64370
- ^{1} French Land Register data, which excludes lakes, ponds, glaciers > 1 km^{2} (0.386 sq mi or 247 acres) and river estuaries.

Mesplède (French pronunciation: [mɛsplɛd]; Occitan: Mespleda) is a commune in the Pyrénées-Atlantiques department in south-western France.

== See also ==
- Communes of the Pyrénées-Atlantiques department
