= Géus-d'Arzacq =

- Commune
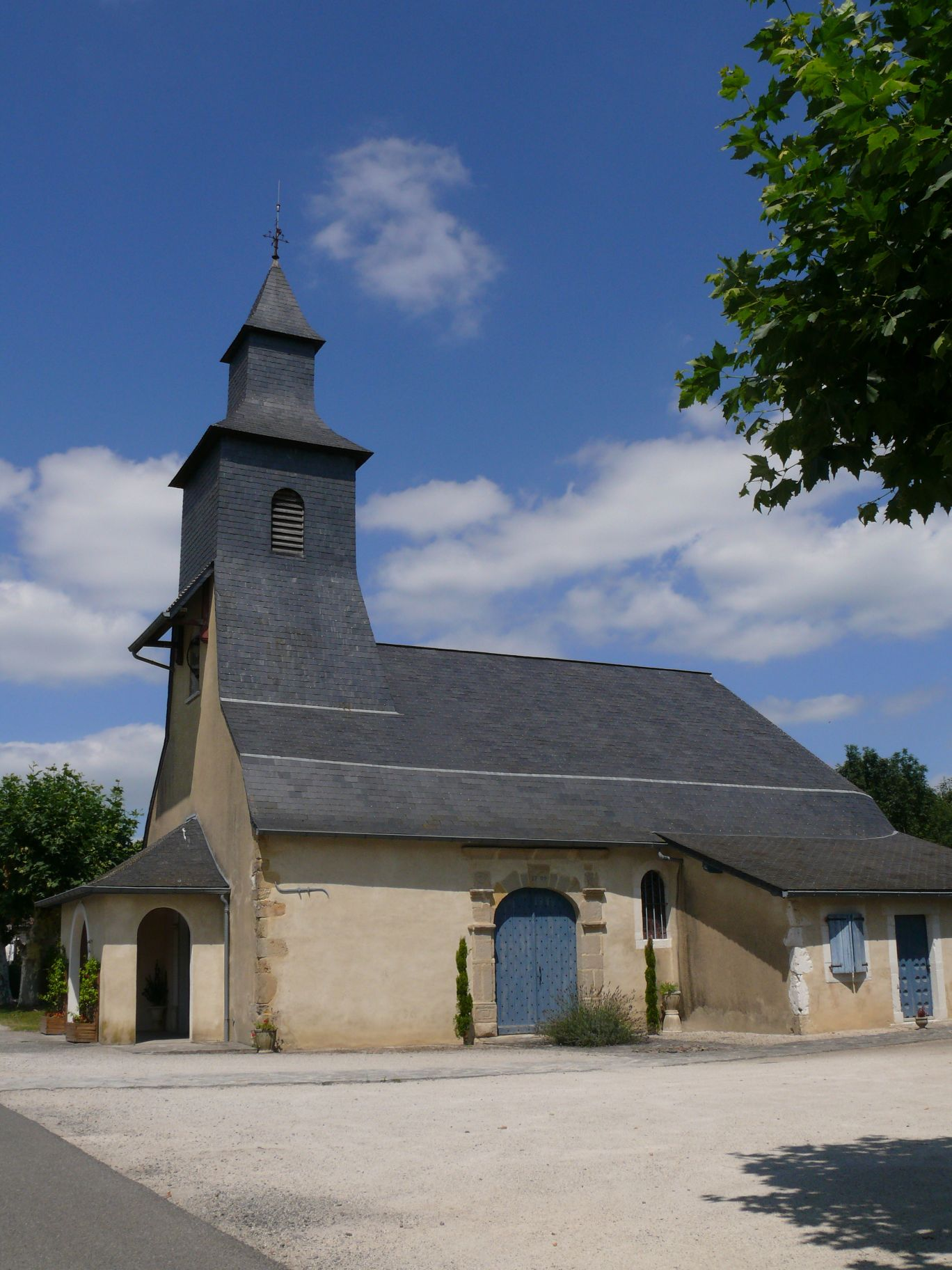
- The church of Notre-Dame
- Location of Géus-d'Arzacq
- Location within France Location within Nouvelle-Aquitaine
- Coordinates: 43°28′55″N 0°31′14″W
- Country: France
- Region: Nouvelle-Aquitaine
- Department: Pyrénées-Atlantiques
- Arrondissement: Pau
- Canton: Artix et Pays de Soubestre
- Intercommunality: Luys en Béarn

Government
  - Mayor (2020–2026): Daniel Pedegert
- Area^{1}: 4.12 km^{2} (1.59 sq mi)
- Elevation: 135 m (443 ft)
- Highest elevation: 138 m (453 ft)
- Lowest elevation: 96 m (315 ft)
- Population (2023): 234
  - Density: 56.8/km^{2} (147/sq mi)
- Time zone: UTC+01:00 (CET)
  - Summer (DST): UTC+02:00 (CEST)
- INSEE/Postal code: 64243 /64370
- ^{1} French Land Register data, which excludes lakes, ponds, glaciers > 1 km^{2} (0.386 sq mi or 247 acres) and river estuaries.

Géus-d'Arzacq (Occitan: Jòcs) is a commune in the Pyrénées-Atlantiques department in south-western France.

== See also ==
- Communes of the Pyrénées-Atlantiques department
