= Uzan, Pyrénées-Atlantiques =

Uzan
- Commune
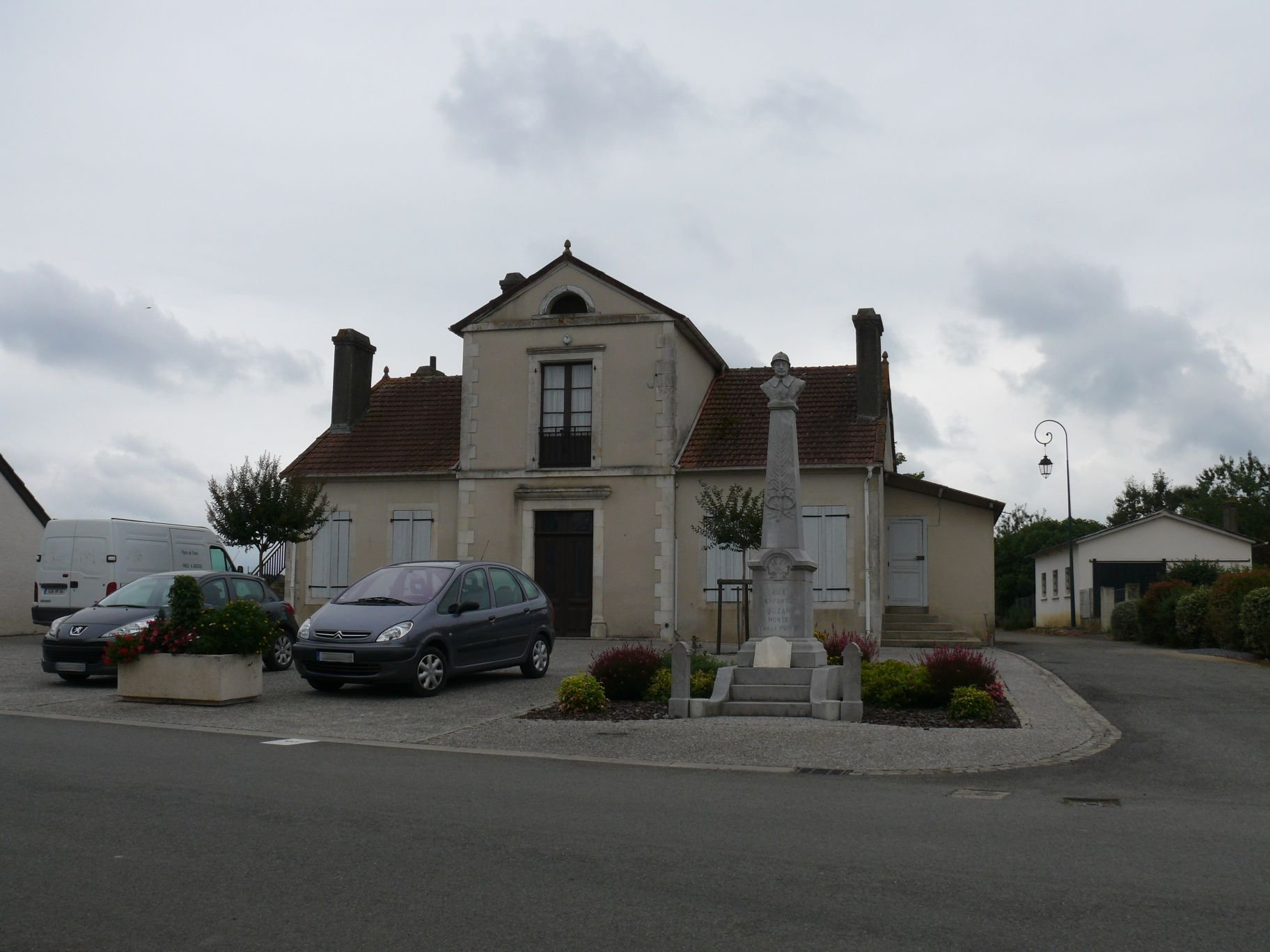
- Town hall
- Location of Uzan
- Location within France Location within Nouvelle-Aquitaine
- Coordinates: 43°28′52″N 0°30′09″W
- Country: France
- Region: Nouvelle-Aquitaine
- Department: Pyrénées-Atlantiques
- Arrondissement: Pau
- Canton: Artix et Pays de Soubestre
- Intercommunality: Luys en Béarn

Government
  - Mayor (2023–2026): Serge Bourdieu
- Area^{1}: 6.20 km^{2} (2.39 sq mi)
- Elevation: 130 m (430 ft)
- Highest elevation: 148 m (486 ft)
- Lowest elevation: 102 m (335 ft)
- Population (2023): 165
  - Density: 26.6/km^{2} (68.9/sq mi)
- Time zone: UTC+01:00 (CET)
  - Summer (DST): UTC+02:00 (CEST)
- INSEE/Postal code: 64548 /64370
- ^{1} French Land Register data, which excludes lakes, ponds, glaciers > 1 km^{2} (0.386 sq mi or 247 acres) and river estuaries.

Uzan (French pronunciation: [yzɑ̃]; Occitan: Usan) is a commune in the Pyrénées-Atlantiques department and Nouvelle-Aquitaine region of south-western France.

== See also ==
- Communes of the Pyrénées-Atlantiques department
