= Séby =

- Commune
- Location of Séby
- Location within France Location within Nouvelle-Aquitaine
- Coordinates: 43°29′22″N 0°23′43″W
- Country: France
- Region: Nouvelle-Aquitaine
- Department: Pyrénées-Atlantiques
- Arrondissement: Pau
- Canton: Artix et Pays de Soubestre
- Intercommunality: Luys en Béarn

Government
  - Mayor (2020–2026): Gilles Muguin-Cabaille
- Area^{1}: 5.97 km^{2} (2.31 sq mi)
- Elevation: 209 m (686 ft)
- Highest elevation: 263 m (863 ft)
- Lowest elevation: 116 m (381 ft)
- Population (2023): 210
  - Density: 35/km^{2} (91/sq mi)
- Time zone: UTC+01:00 (CET)
  - Summer (DST): UTC+02:00 (CEST)
- INSEE/Postal code: 64514 /64410
- ^{1} French Land Register data, which excludes lakes, ponds, glaciers > 1 km^{2} (0.386 sq mi or 247 acres) and river estuaries.

Séby (French pronunciation: [sebi]; Occitan: Sevin) is a commune in the Pyrénées-Atlantiques department in south-western France.

== See also ==
- Communes of the Pyrénées-Atlantiques department
