= Garlin =

- Commune
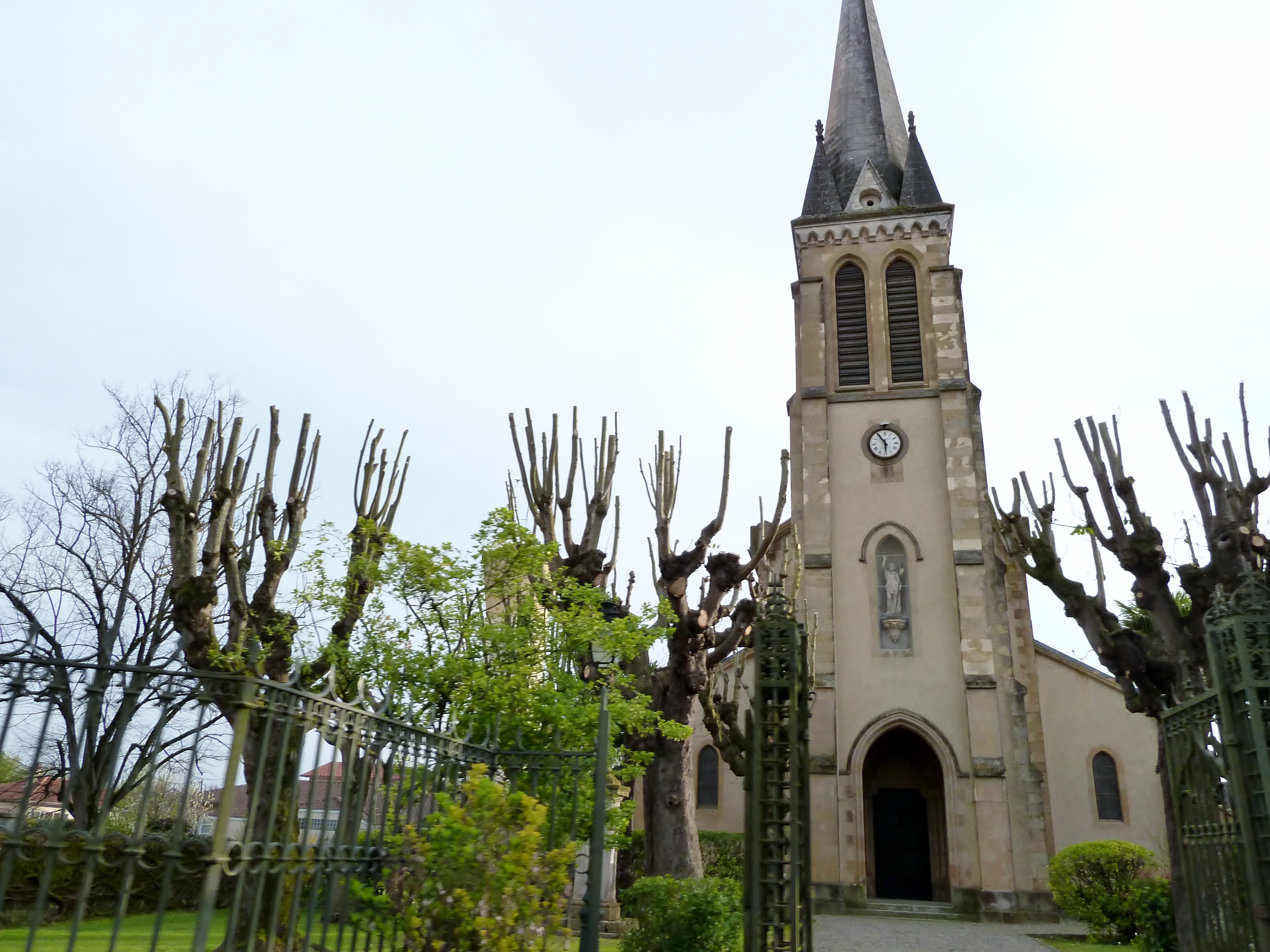
- The church of Garlin

- Coat of arms
- Location of Garlin
- Location within France Location within Nouvelle-Aquitaine
- Coordinates: 43°33′42″N 0°16′13″W
- Country: France
- Region: Nouvelle-Aquitaine
- Department: Pyrénées-Atlantiques
- Arrondissement: Pau
- Canton: Terres des Luys et Coteaux du Vic-Bilh
- Intercommunality: Luys en Béarn

Government
  - Mayor (2020–2026): André Lanusse-Cazalé
- Area^{1}: 18.30 km^{2} (7.07 sq mi)
- Elevation: 160 m (520 ft)
- Highest elevation: 223 m (732 ft)
- Lowest elevation: 110 m (360 ft)
- Population (2023): 1,360
  - Density: 74.3/km^{2} (192/sq mi)
- Time zone: UTC+01:00 (CET)
  - Summer (DST): UTC+02:00 (CEST)
- INSEE/Postal code: 64233 /64330
- ^{1} French Land Register data, which excludes lakes, ponds, glaciers > 1 km^{2} (0.386 sq mi or 247 acres) and river estuaries.

Garlin (French pronunciation: [ɡaʁlɛ̃]) is a commune in the Pyrénées-Atlantiques department in south-western France.

== Twin towns – sister cities ==
- Ayerbe, Spain, since 1977

== See also ==
- Communes of the Pyrénées-Atlantiques department
