= Labastide-Monréjeau =

Labastide-Monréjeau Lahòra (Occitan)
- Commune
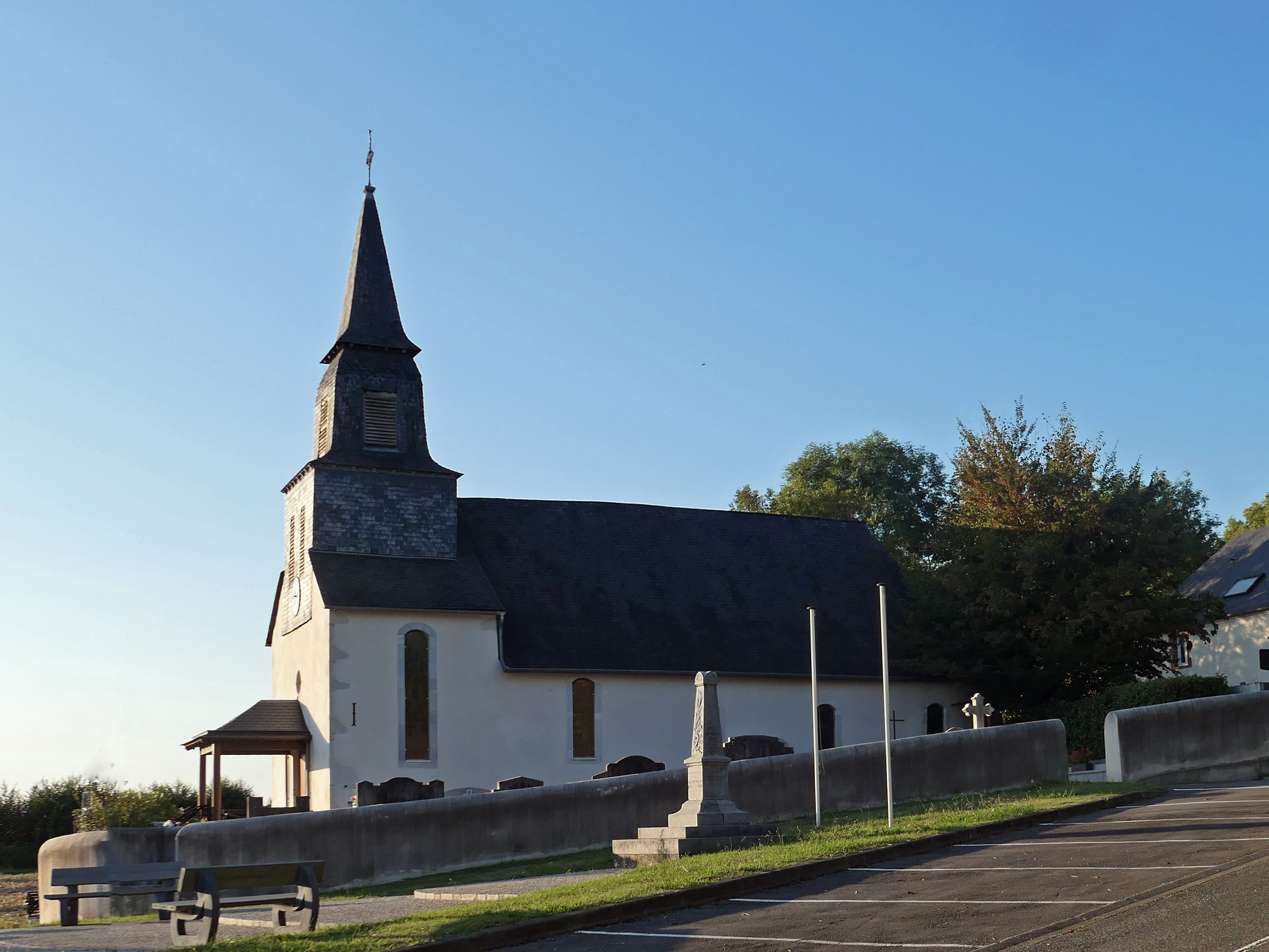
- Église Saint-Jean-Baptiste
- Location of Labastide-Monréjeau
- Location within France Location within Nouvelle-Aquitaine
- Coordinates: 43°23′38″N 0°31′28″W
- Country: France
- Region: Nouvelle-Aquitaine
- Department: Pyrénées-Atlantiques
- Arrondissement: Pau
- Canton: Artix et Pays de Soubestre
- Intercommunality: Lacq-Orthez

Government
  - Mayor (2020–2026): Jean-Simon Leblanc
- Area^{1}: 8.19 km^{2} (3.16 sq mi)
- Elevation: 237 m (778 ft)
- Highest elevation: 260 m (850 ft)
- Lowest elevation: 111 m (364 ft)
- Population (2023): 591
  - Density: 72.2/km^{2} (187/sq mi)
- Time zone: UTC+01:00 (CET)
  - Summer (DST): UTC+02:00 (CEST)
- INSEE/Postal code: 64290 /64170
- ^{1} French Land Register data, which excludes lakes, ponds, glaciers > 1 km^{2} (0.386 sq mi or 247 acres) and river estuaries.

Labastide-Monréjeau (French pronunciation: [labastid mɔ̃ʁeʒo]; Occitan: Lahòra) is a commune in the Pyrénées-Atlantiques department in the Nouvelle-Aquitaine region in Southwestern France. As of 2023, the population of the commune was 591.

== See also ==
- Communes of the Pyrénées-Atlantiques department
