= Lonçon =

- Commune
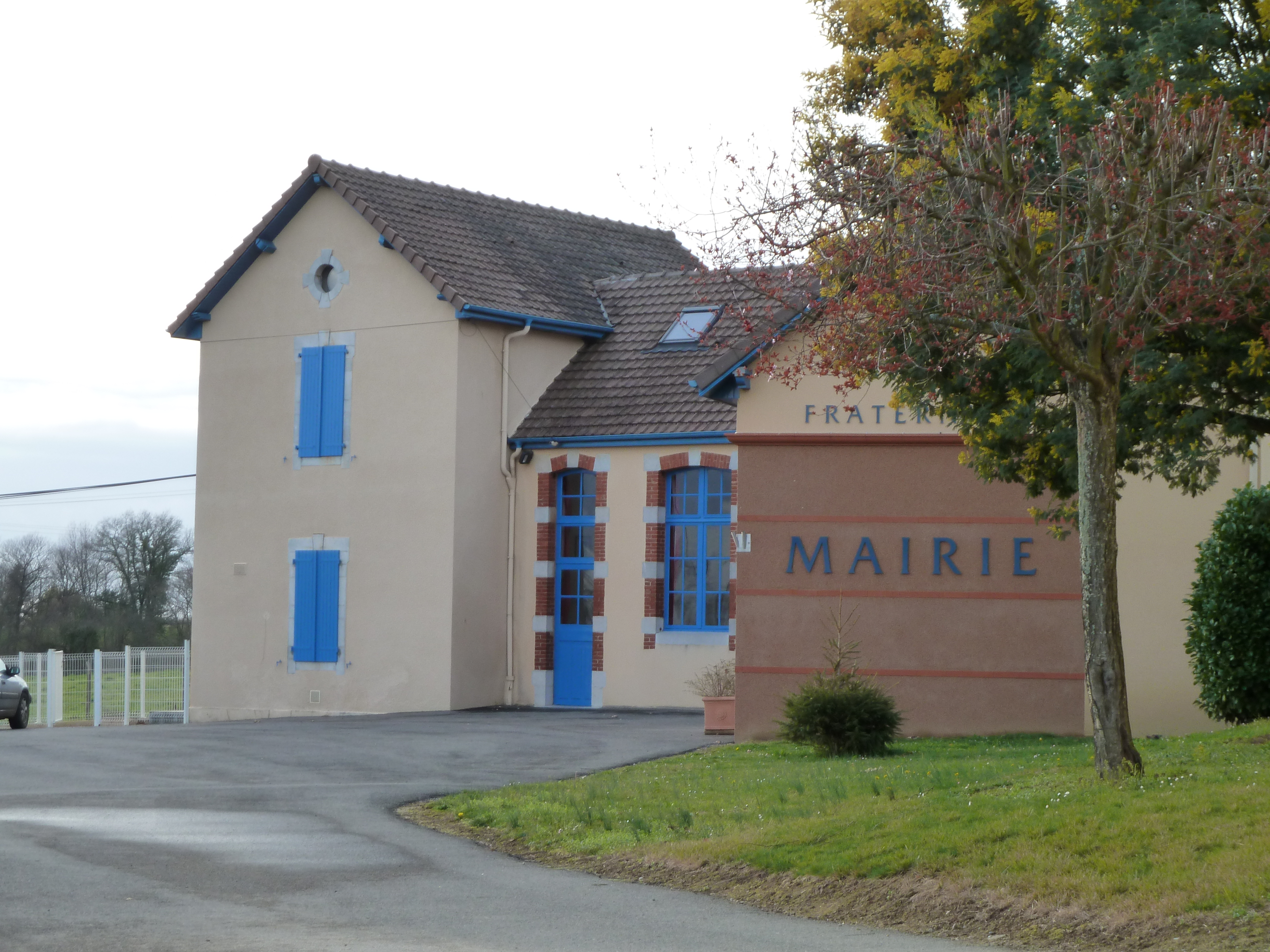
- The town hall of Lonçon
- Location of Lonçon
- Location within France Location within Nouvelle-Aquitaine
- Coordinates: 43°28′14″N 0°25′27″W
- Country: France
- Region: Nouvelle-Aquitaine
- Department: Pyrénées-Atlantiques
- Arrondissement: Pau
- Canton: Artix et Pays de Soubestre
- Intercommunality: Luys en Béarn

Government
  - Mayor (2020–2026): Patrick Bendail
- Area^{1}: 5.52 km^{2} (2.13 sq mi)
- Elevation: 172 m (564 ft)
- Highest elevation: 258 m (846 ft)
- Lowest elevation: 135 m (443 ft)
- Population (2023): 221
  - Density: 40.0/km^{2} (104/sq mi)
- Time zone: UTC+01:00 (CET)
  - Summer (DST): UTC+02:00 (CEST)
- INSEE/Postal code: 64347 /64410
- ^{1} French Land Register data, which excludes lakes, ponds, glaciers > 1 km^{2} (0.386 sq mi or 247 acres) and river estuaries.

Lonçon (French pronunciation: [lɔ̃sɔ̃]; Occitan: Lonson) is a commune in the Pyrénées-Atlantiques department in south-western France.

== See also ==
- Communes of the Pyrénées-Atlantiques department
