= Montagut, Pyrénées-Atlantiques =

Montagut
- Commune
- Location of Montagut
- Location within France Location within Nouvelle-Aquitaine
- Coordinates: 43°32′52″N 0°30′11″W
- Country: France
- Region: Nouvelle-Aquitaine
- Department: Pyrénées-Atlantiques
- Arrondissement: Pau
- Canton: Artix et Pays de Soubestre
- Intercommunality: Luys en Béarn

Government
  - Mayor (2020–2026): Jean-Luc Laulhé
- Area^{1}: 6.18 km^{2} (2.39 sq mi)
- Elevation: 128 m (420 ft)
- Highest elevation: 157 m (515 ft)
- Lowest elevation: 75 m (246 ft)
- Population (2023): 116
  - Density: 18.8/km^{2} (48.6/sq mi)
- Time zone: UTC+01:00 (CET)
  - Summer (DST): UTC+02:00 (CEST)
- INSEE/Postal code: 64397 /64410
- ^{1} French Land Register data, which excludes lakes, ponds, glaciers > 1 km^{2} (0.386 sq mi or 247 acres) and river estuaries.

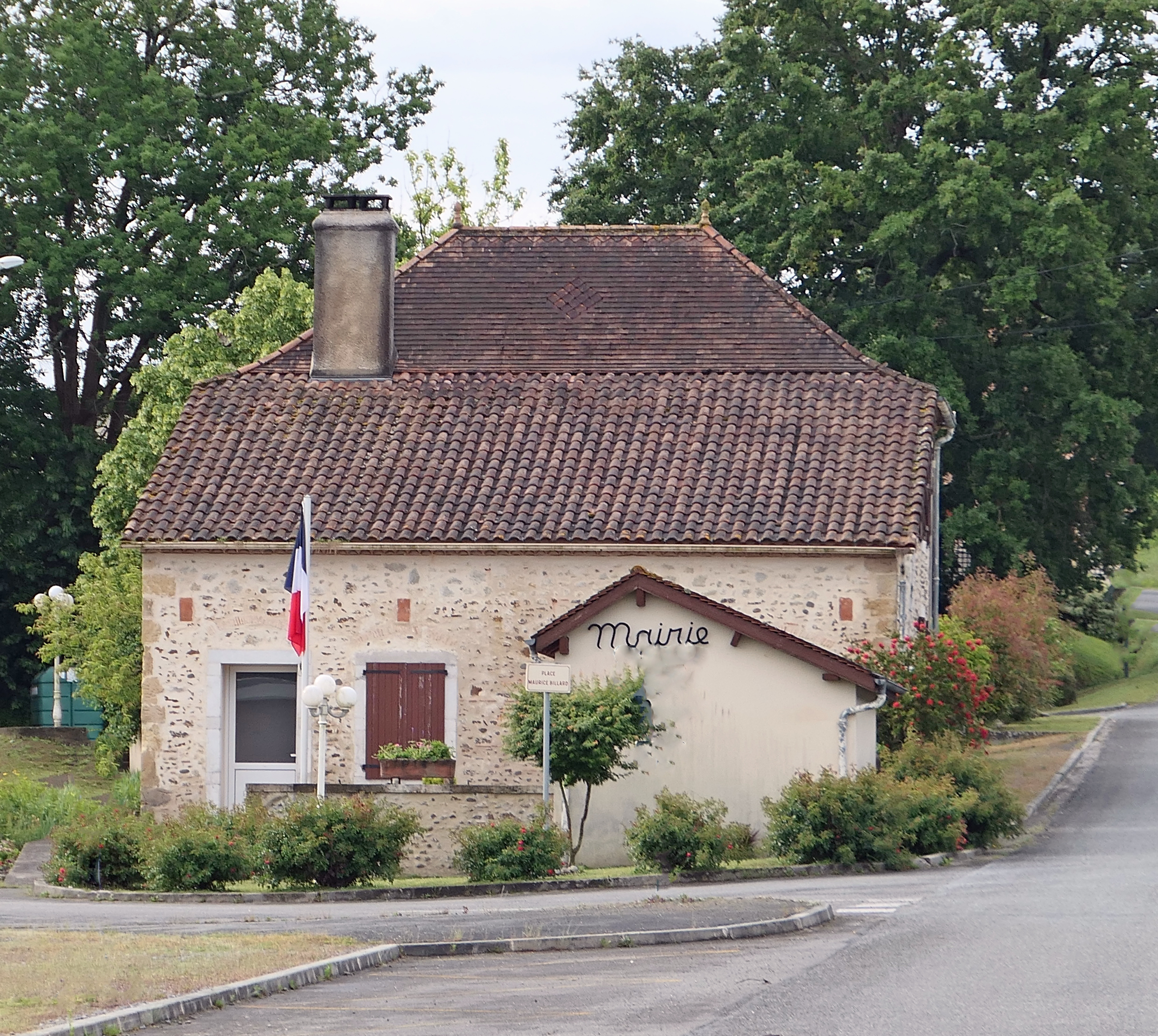

Montagut (French pronunciation: [mɔ̃taɡyt]) is a commune in the Pyrénées-Atlantiques department in south-western France.

== See also ==
- Communes of the Pyrénées-Atlantiques department
