= Mazerolles, Pyrénées-Atlantiques =

Mazerolles
- Commune
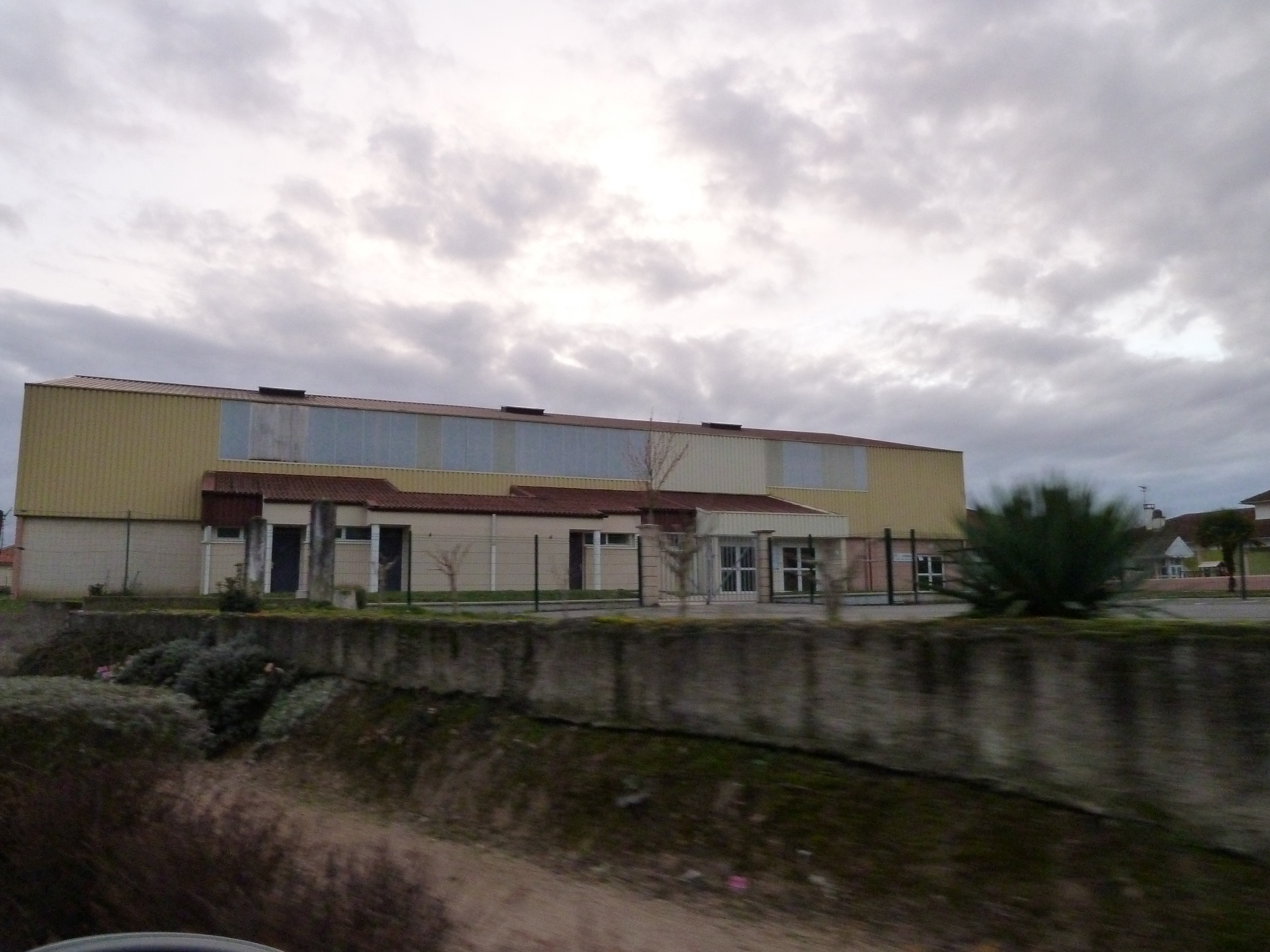
- The multipurpose hall of Mazerolles
- Location of Mazerolles
- Location within France Location within Nouvelle-Aquitaine
- Coordinates: 43°27′00″N 0°28′07″W
- Country: France
- Region: Nouvelle-Aquitaine
- Department: Pyrénées-Atlantiques
- Arrondissement: Pau
- Canton: Artix et Pays de Soubestre
- Intercommunality: Luys en Béarn

Government
  - Mayor (2020–2026): Isabelle Péguilhé
- Area^{1}: 11.71 km^{2} (4.52 sq mi)
- Elevation: 123 m (404 ft)
- Highest elevation: 195 m (640 ft)
- Lowest elevation: 116 m (381 ft)
- Population (2023): 1,194
  - Density: 102.0/km^{2} (264.1/sq mi)
- Time zone: UTC+01:00 (CET)
  - Summer (DST): UTC+02:00 (CEST)
- INSEE/Postal code: 64374 /64230
- ^{1} French Land Register data, which excludes lakes, ponds, glaciers > 1 km^{2} (0.386 sq mi or 247 acres) and river estuaries.

Mazerolles (French pronunciation: [mazʁɔl]; Occitan: Maseròlas) is a commune in the Pyrénées-Atlantiques department in south-western France. The locally-famous pastry pastis d'Amélie is produced here, at the Larquier bakery.

== See also ==
- Communes of the Pyrénées-Atlantiques department
