= Larreule, Pyrénées-Atlantiques =

Larreule
- Commune
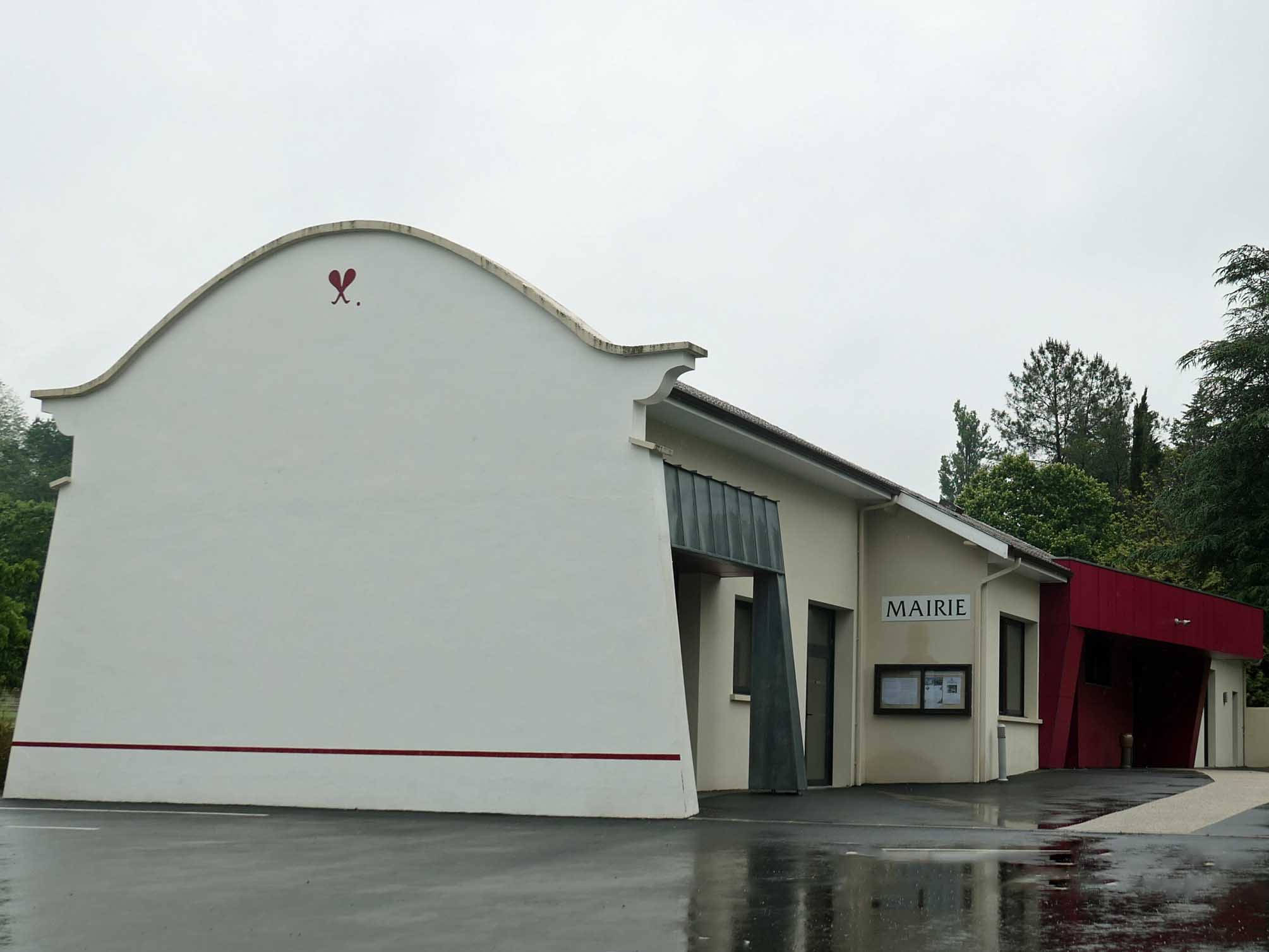
- Larreule Town hall
- Location of Larreule
- Location within France Location within Nouvelle-Aquitaine
- Coordinates: 43°28′44″N 0°28′18″W
- Country: France
- Region: Nouvelle-Aquitaine
- Department: Pyrénées-Atlantiques
- Arrondissement: Pau
- Canton: Artix et Pays de Soubestre
- Intercommunality: Luys en Béarn

Government
  - Mayor (2020–2026): Philippe Lalanne
- Area^{1}: 10.05 km^{2} (3.88 sq mi)
- Elevation: 183 m (600 ft)
- Highest elevation: 230 m (750 ft)
- Lowest elevation: 104 m (341 ft)
- Population (2023): 194
  - Density: 19.3/km^{2} (50.0/sq mi)
- Time zone: UTC+01:00 (CET)
  - Summer (DST): UTC+02:00 (CEST)
- INSEE/Postal code: 64318 /64410
- ^{1} French Land Register data, which excludes lakes, ponds, glaciers > 1 km^{2} (0.386 sq mi or 247 acres) and river estuaries.

Larreule (French pronunciation: [laʁœl]; Occitan: La Reula) is a commune in the Pyrénées-Atlantiques department in south-western France.

== See also ==
- Communes of the Pyrénées-Atlantiques department
