= Garos =

- Commune
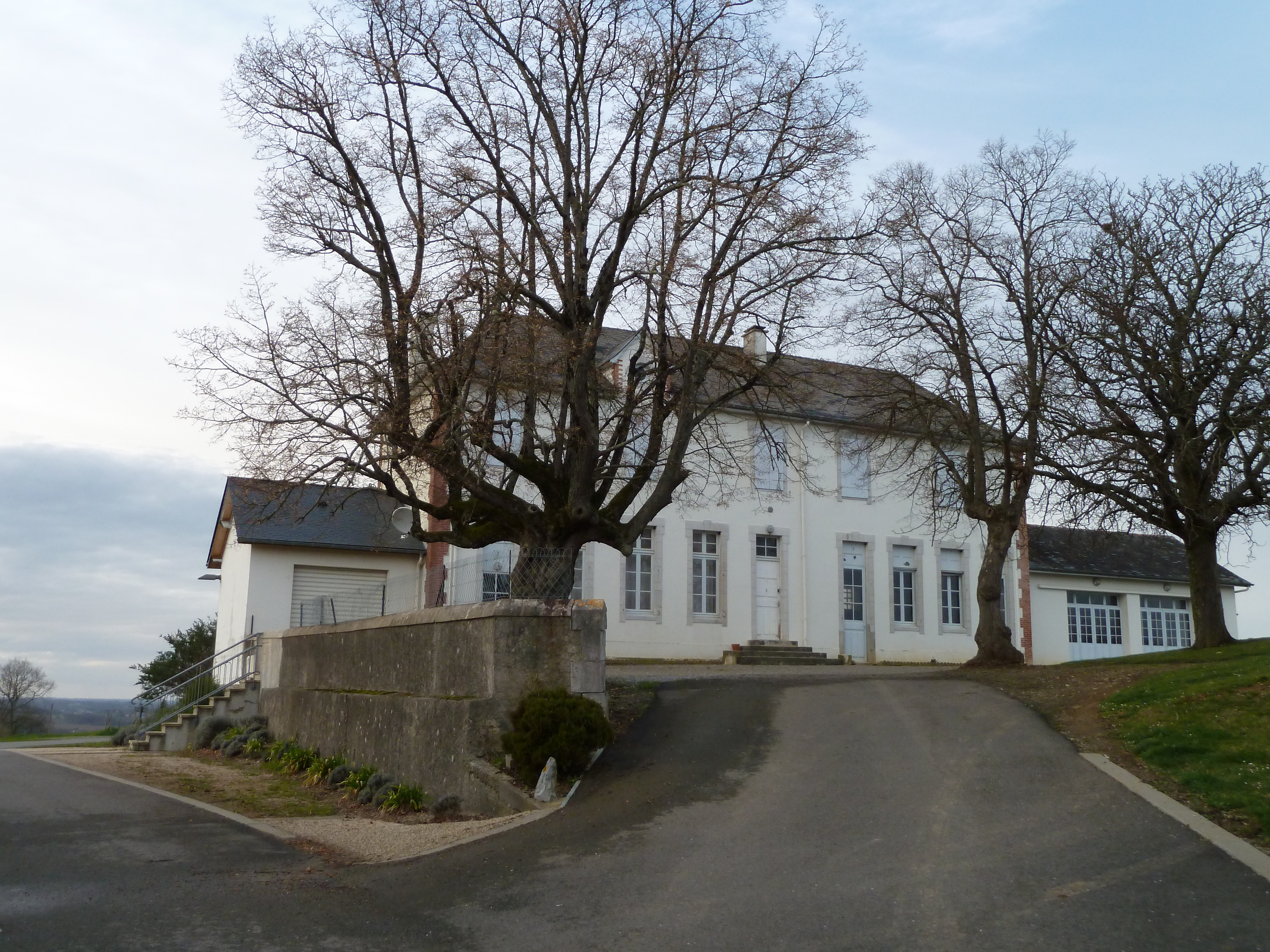
- The town hall of Garos
- Location of Garos
- Location within France Location within Nouvelle-Aquitaine
- Coordinates: 43°30′26″N 0°28′19″W
- Country: France
- Region: Nouvelle-Aquitaine
- Department: Pyrénées-Atlantiques
- Arrondissement: Pau
- Canton: Artix et Pays de Soubestre
- Intercommunality: Luys en Béarn

Government
  - Mayor (2020–2026): Jean-Marc Theulé
- Area^{1}: 12.06 km^{2} (4.66 sq mi)
- Elevation: 191 m (627 ft)
- Highest elevation: 236 m (774 ft)
- Lowest elevation: 94 m (308 ft)
- Population (2023): 262
  - Density: 21.7/km^{2} (56.3/sq mi)
- Time zone: UTC+01:00 (CET)
  - Summer (DST): UTC+02:00 (CEST)
- INSEE/Postal code: 64234 /64410
- ^{1} French Land Register data, which excludes lakes, ponds, glaciers > 1 km^{2} (0.386 sq mi or 247 acres) and river estuaries.

Garos (French pronunciation: [ɡaʁɔs]; Occitan: Garòs) is a commune in the Pyrénées-Atlantiques department in south-western France.
