= Sarpourenx =

- Commune
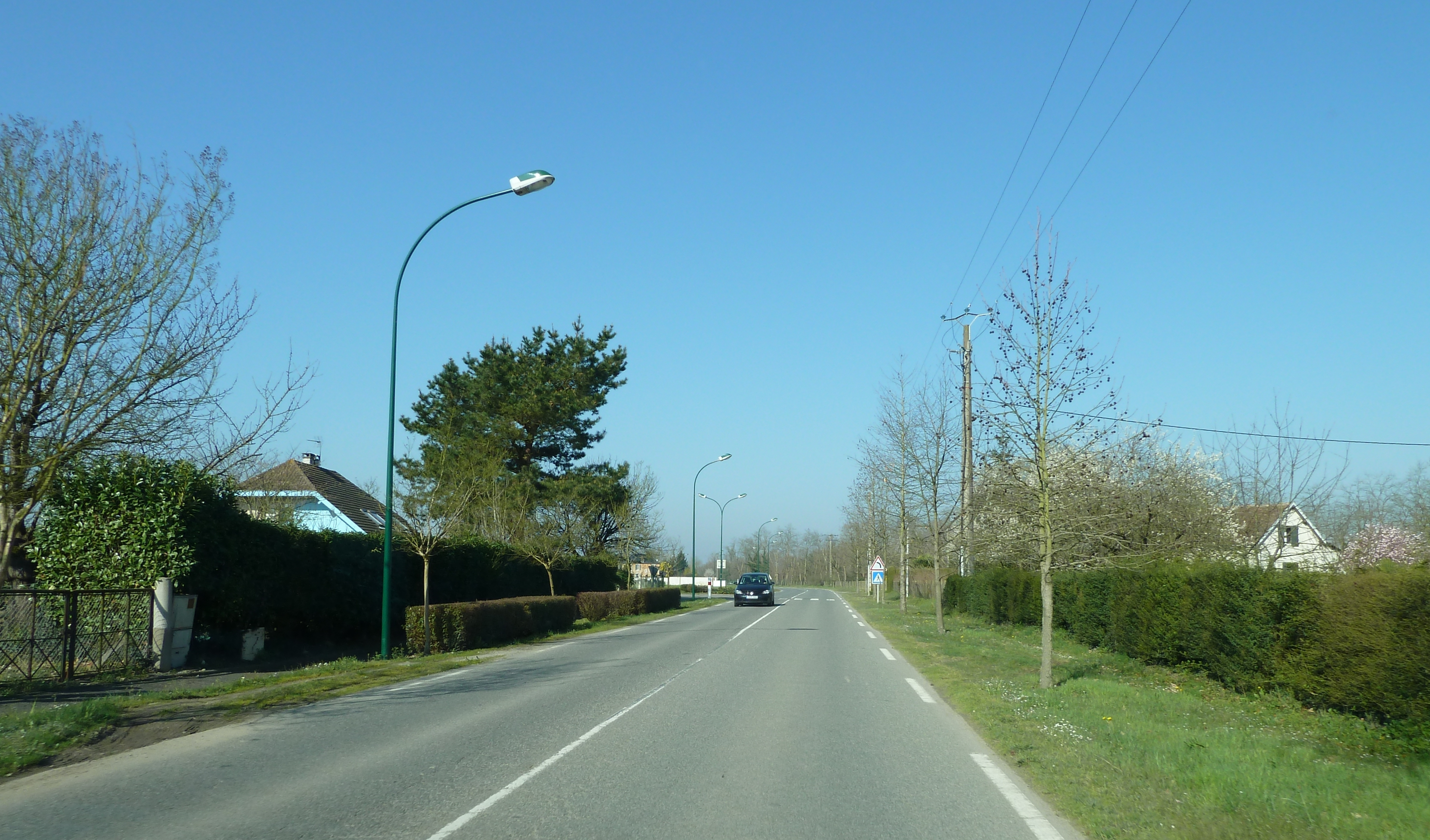
- The road through Sarpourenx

- Coat of arms
- Location of Sarpourenx
- Location within France Location within Nouvelle-Aquitaine
- Coordinates: 43°27′27″N 0°42′39″W
- Country: France
- Region: Nouvelle-Aquitaine
- Department: Pyrénées-Atlantiques
- Arrondissement: Pau
- Canton: Le Cœur de Béarn
- Intercommunality: Lacq-Orthez

Government
  - Mayor (2020–2026): Jean-Jacques Lascabes
- Area^{1}: 3.35 km^{2} (1.29 sq mi)
- Elevation: 71 m (233 ft)
- Highest elevation: 78 m (256 ft)
- Lowest elevation: 59 m (194 ft)
- Population (2023): 285
  - Density: 85.1/km^{2} (220/sq mi)
- Time zone: UTC+01:00 (CET)
  - Summer (DST): UTC+02:00 (CEST)
- INSEE/Postal code: 64505 /64300
- ^{1} French Land Register data, which excludes lakes, ponds, glaciers > 1 km^{2} (0.386 sq mi or 247 acres) and river estuaries.

Sarpourenx (French pronunciation: [saʁpuʁɛ̃ks]; Béarnese: Sarporens) is a commune in the Pyrénées-Atlantiques department in south-western France, notable for once having forbidden death by mayoral decree.

== History ==
Never a large community, the population of Sarpourenx was reported as 25 households in 1385. The town was then part of the bailiwick of Larbaig.

French historian and archivist Paul Raymond (1833–1878) recorded the existence in Sarpourenx of an abbaye laïque (a small, independent parish operated for the profit of an influential local), administered by the viscounts of Béarn.

The name "Sarpourenx" is also historically attested in the variant forms "Sarporencx" (1385 Béarn census), "Sarporencxs", and "Sarporenxs" (from the 1538 and 1546 redistrictings of Béarn, respectively).

== Geography ==
Sarpourenx is located in the historic former province of Béarn, on the left bank of the river Gave de Pau. Its territory includes at least one small hamlet, Le Gave, and a tributary stream of the Gave de Pau, Géu Mort. Neighboring communes include Castétis (north), Argagnon (east), Biron (west), Castetner (west), Maslacq (south), and Orthez (southeast). Via road, Sarpourenx is accessible by Departmental Route 9, near exit 8 of Autoroute A64.

== Population ==
The demonym is Sarpourenois in French.

Historical population
Year	Pop.	±% p.a.
1968	205	—
1975	199	−0.42%
1982	208	+0.63%
1990	220	+0.70%
1999	240	+0.97%
2007	269	+1.44%
2012	269	+0.00%
2017	338	+4.67%
2023	285	−2.80%
Source: INSEE

== Economy ==
Sarpourenx is part of the appellation zone for production of Ossau-Iraty, a sheep's milk cheese.

== Government ==
Mayors of Sarpourenx
Term	Name
1971–2008	Gérard Lalanne
2008–2020	Emmanuelle Lacroix-Chague
2020–incumbent	Jean-Jacques Lascabes

On 13 February 2008, then-mayor Gérard Lalanne issued a municipal order forbidding death within the commune's jurisdiction, threatening severe punishment for offenders. His action was a symbolic protest — Sarpourenx's small cemetery was becoming crowded, and a judge's decision had rejected the commune's request to expropriate private farmland for burial ground. Lalanne himself died ten months later.

== See also ==
- Communes of the Pyrénées-Atlantiques department
- Cugnaux — another French commune with an anti-death ordinance
