= Pardies =

- Commune
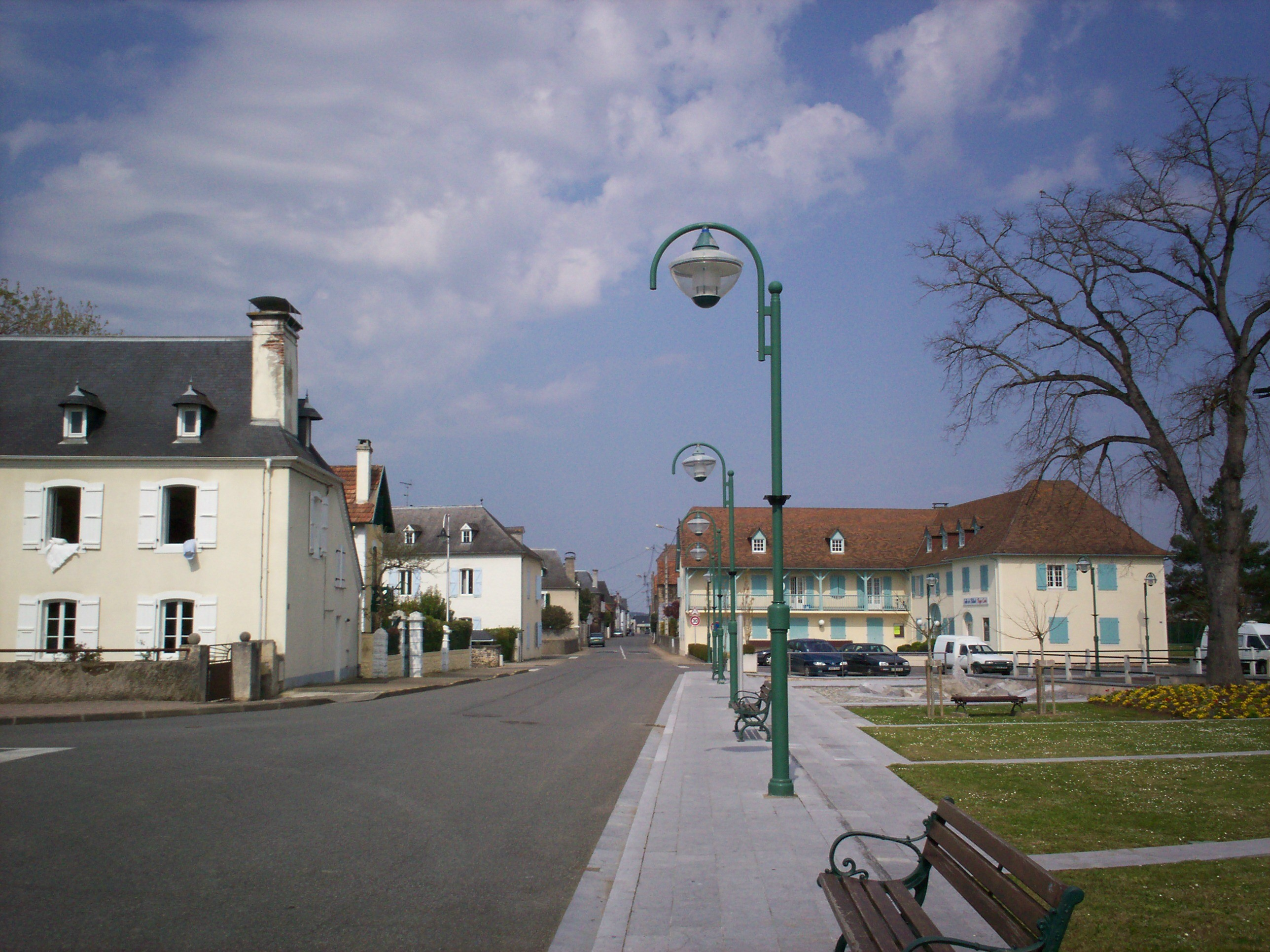
- The village

- Coat of arms
- Location of Pardies
- Location within France Location within Nouvelle-Aquitaine
- Coordinates: 43°22′02″N 0°35′06″W
- Country: France
- Region: Nouvelle-Aquitaine
- Department: Pyrénées-Atlantiques
- Arrondissement: Pau
- Canton: Le Cœur de Béarn

Government
  - Mayor (2020–2026): Daniel Birou
- Area^{1}: 5.82 km^{2} (2.25 sq mi)
- Elevation: 116 m (381 ft)
- Highest elevation: 165 m (541 ft)
- Lowest elevation: 102 m (335 ft)
- Population (2023): 930
  - Density: 160/km^{2} (410/sq mi)
- Time zone: UTC+01:00 (CET)
  - Summer (DST): UTC+02:00 (CEST)
- INSEE/Postal code: 64443 /64150
- Website: www.pardies.fr
- ^{1} French Land Register data, which excludes lakes, ponds, glaciers > 1 km^{2} (0.386 sq mi or 247 acres) and river estuaries.

Pardies (French pronunciation: [paʁdi]; Occitan: Pardias) is a commune in the Pyrénées-Atlantiques department in south-western France.

== Geography ==
=== Neighbouring communes ===
- North-East: Artix
- North-West: Os-Marsillon
- East: Bésingrand
- West: Noguères
- South-East: Parbayse
- South-West: Lahourcade
- South: Monein

== History ==
=== Administration ===
List of successive mayors of Pardies

Name	Political Party	In office
René Lacabe		1995 - 2008
René Lacabe		2008 - 2014

== Notable people ==
- Charles Lacoste

== See also ==
- Communes of the Pyrénées-Atlantiques department
