= Abos, Pyrénées-Atlantiques =

Abos
- Commune
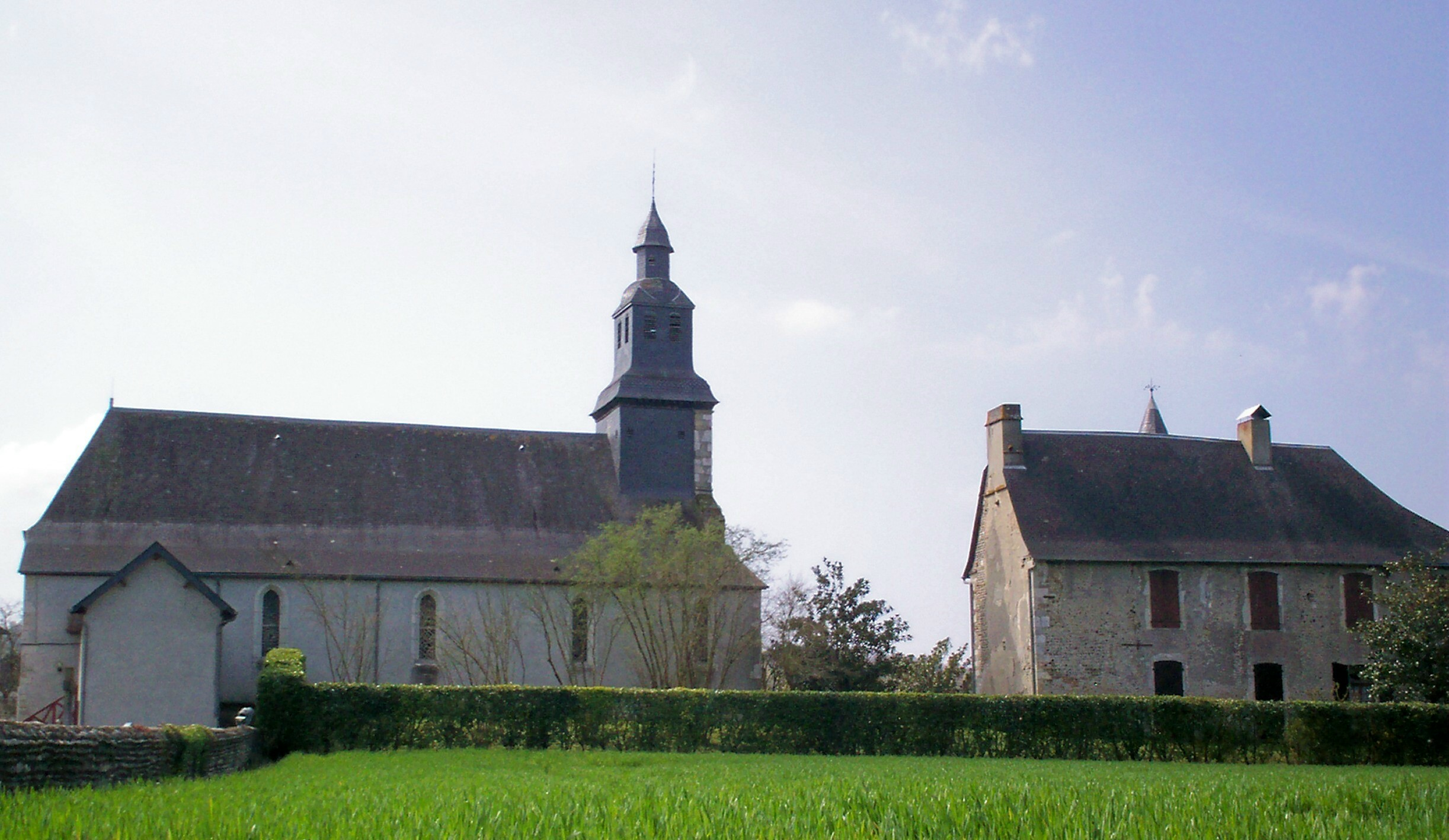
- Church of St. John the Baptist

- Coat of arms
- Location of Abos
- Location within France Location within Nouvelle-Aquitaine
- Coordinates: 43°21′32″N 0°33′43″W
- Country: France
- Region: Nouvelle-Aquitaine
- Department: Pyrénées-Atlantiques
- Arrondissement: Pau
- Canton: Le Cœur de Béarn
- Intercommunality: Lacq-Orthez

Government
  - Mayor (2020–2026): Jean-Pierre Cazalère
- Area^{1}: 8.45 km^{2} (3.26 sq mi)
- Elevation: 123 m (404 ft)
- Highest elevation: 250 m (820 ft)
- Lowest elevation: 108 m (354 ft)
- Population (2023): 526
  - Density: 62.2/km^{2} (161/sq mi)
- Demonym(s): Abosiens, Abosiennes
- Time zone: UTC+01:00 (CET)
  - Summer (DST): UTC+02:00 (CEST)
- INSEE/Postal code: 64005 /64360
- ^{1} French Land Register data, which excludes lakes, ponds, glaciers > 1 km^{2} (0.386 sq mi or 247 acres) and river estuaries.

Abos (French pronunciation: [abɔs]; Occitan: Abòs) is a commune in the Pyrénées-Atlantiques department in the Nouvelle-Aquitaine region in southwestern France.

== Geography ==
=== Location ===
Abos is located 15 km north-west of Pau and 20 km southeast of Lescar, on the left bank of the Gave de Pau which is the north east boundary of the commune. Highway D2 (Route de Pau) passes through the commune; however, this route bypasses the village and Route D2002 must be taken to enter the village. The southeastern boundary of the commune is formed by Highway D229 (Chateau d'Abos).

=== Hydrography ===
The commune is located in the Drainage basin of the Adour, with the Gave de Pau in the northeast and a number of streams in the commune feed into the La Baise river (and its tributary, the old channel of the mill, itself fed by the Arrious Brook) and Juscle.

=== Localities and hamlets ===
- Bagneres
- Cap de Castel
- Chateau of Abos
- Idernes
- Le Moulin d'en Bas
- Le Moulin d'en Haut
- Peyré
- Saint-Laurent

== Toponymy ==
The name Abos is mentioned in 1116 and 1234 (Pierre de Marca) and in the 13th century (Fors de Béarn).

It also appears in the forms:

- Abossium (1345, Notaries of Pardies)
- Abos (1385, census of Béarn)
- Abous (1538, Reformation of Béarn)
- Abos (1630 Pierre de Marca and in 1750 on the Cassini Map.

Michel Grosclaude proposed a Latin etymology of Avus with the aquitaine suffix -ossum.

The commune name in Béarnais is Abòs (according to the conventional standard of Occitan).

Aubrun was a farm in Abos which was mentioned in 1538 as La boyrie aperade d'Aubrun, Reformation of Béarn B. 637 in the 1863 dictionary.

Cap de Castel is a hamlet in Abos mentioned by the dictionary in 1863.

Paul Raymond said in 1863 that the Chateau of Abos or Castet-d'Abos, was a vassal of the Viscounts of Béarn.

Donadon was a fief under the Viscounts of Béarn, mentioned in 1538 (reformation of Béarn).

The fief of Idernes was a vassal of the Viscounts of Béarn and appeared in the forms:

- Ydernas and Ydernes (1538 and 1546 respectively, reformation of Béarn).

Maucor was a fief of Abos, cited with the spelling of L'ostau de Maucoo in 1385 in the Census of Béarn. This fief was a vassal of the Viscounts of Béarn then restored to the Bailiwick of Lagor and Pardies as was Saint Jean, another fief of Abos, also mentioned in 1385 (Census of Béarn) in the form of L'ostau de Sent-Johan d'Abos.

Saint-Laurent, a hamlet and fief of Abos under the Viscounts of Béarn, was also restored to the Bailiwick of Lagor and Pardies. It was mentioned in the forms Sent-Laurentz d'Abos (1343, Notaries of Pardies) and Saint-Laurens d'Abos (1674, Reformation of Béarn).

== History ==
Paul Raymond noted that the commune had a Lay Abbey a vassal of the Viscounts of Béarn and in 1385, Abos depended on the bailiwick of Lagos and Pardies with 49 fires.

The Lord of Abos was of the first rank after the Barons (called ruffebaron) of Béarn.

== Heraldry ==
Arms of Abos	The arms of the commune of Abos are blazoned : Quarterly party per saltire, the first Vert, chimney of Or smoking argent flanked at dexter by a factory of Or; at second Gules, an ear of corn of Or leaved in Vert; at third Gules, a bunch of grapes of Or leaved in Vert; at fourth Vert, a church argent surmounting two cows of Or confronting. horned, collared and belled.

== Administration ==
List of Successive Mayors of Abos

From	To	Name	Party
1995	2014	Jean-Marie Cazalère	
2014	2026	Jean-Pierre Cazalère	DVD

=== Inter-communality ===
The town is a member of nine inter-communal organisations:

- the community of communes of Lacq-Orthez
- SIVU for the development and management of the river basin of the baïse
- AEP union for the Gave and the baïse;
- sanitation union of the communes of the valleys of Juscle and Baise
- Energy union for the Pyrenees-Atlantiques;
- inter-communal union of Monein;
- inter-communal union for defence against flooding of the Gave de Pau
- inter-communal union for forestry management for Gabe-Baise
- the inter-communal union for educational regrouping for Abos and Tarsacq

== Population ==
The inhabitants of the commune are known as Abosiens or Abosiennes in French.

Historical population

Year	Pop.	±% p.a.
1793	573	—
1821	599	+0.16%
1846	567	−0.22%
1872	478	−0.65%
1901	401	−0.60%
1926	346	−0.59%
1946	339	−0.10%
1962	432	+1.53%
1968	479	+1.74%

Year	Pop.	±% p.a.
1975	462	−0.51%
1982	467	+0.15%
1990	479	+0.32%
1999	481	+0.05%
2007	472	−0.24%
2012	520	+1.96%
2017	542	+0.83%
2023	526	−0.50%

Source: EHESS (1793–1999) and INSEE

== Economy ==
The commune is part of the Jurançon AOC and Béarn AOC vineyard regions. Activity in the commune is mainly agricultural (livestock and corn).

The commune is also part of the Appellation d'origine contrôlée (AOC) zone designation of Ossau-Iraty cheese.

== Culture and Heritage ==
=== Religious Heritage ===
The Church of Saint John the Baptist dates to the 19th century.

=== Facilities ===
The town has a primary school.

=== Notable people linked to the commune ===
- Didier Courrèges is a French horseman, a former high level event rider (CCE) and a member of the Cadre Noir - elite instructors at the National Riding School of Saumur. He now lives in Abos.

== See also ==
- Communes of the Pyrénées-Atlantiques department
