= Lahourcade =

- Commune
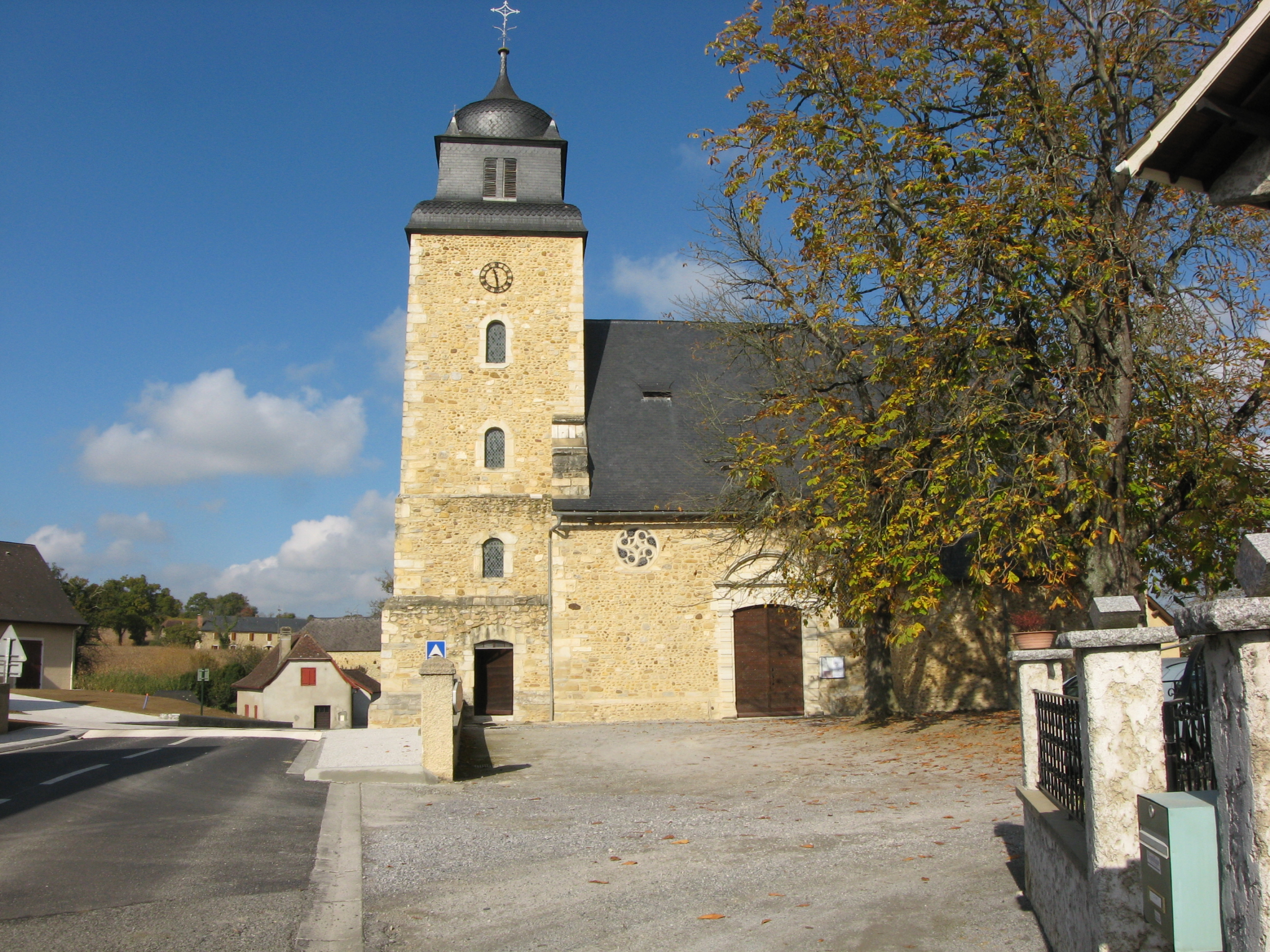
- Lahourcade church

- Coat of arms
- Location of Lahourcade
- Location within France Location within Nouvelle-Aquitaine
- Coordinates: 43°21′19″N 0°36′58″W
- Country: France
- Region: Nouvelle-Aquitaine
- Department: Pyrénées-Atlantiques
- Arrondissement: Pau
- Canton: Le Cœur de Béarn

Government
  - Mayor (2020–2026): Bernard Gobert
- Area^{1}: 10.94 km^{2} (4.22 sq mi)
- Elevation: 155 m (509 ft)
- Highest elevation: 267 m (876 ft)
- Lowest elevation: 110 m (360 ft)
- Population (2023): 709
  - Density: 64.8/km^{2} (168/sq mi)
- Time zone: UTC+01:00 (CET)
  - Summer (DST): UTC+02:00 (CEST)
- INSEE/Postal code: 64306 /64150
- ^{1} French Land Register data, which excludes lakes, ponds, glaciers > 1 km^{2} (0.386 sq mi or 247 acres) and river estuaries.

Lahourcade (French pronunciation: [la.uʁkad]; Occitan: La Horcada) is a commune in the Pyrénées-Atlantiques department in south-western France.

== Geography ==
Neighbouring communes:

- North: Lagor, Mourenx and Noguères
- East: Pardies
- South-East: Monein
- South-West: Lucq-de-Béarn

== Administration ==
List of successive mayors
Term	Name	Party
1989–1995	Michel Ardohain	
1995–2008	Jean-Pierre Ladaurade	
2008–2020	Gérard Paloumet	
since 2020	Bernard Gobert	

== See also ==
- Communes of the Pyrénées-Atlantiques department
