= Angous =

- Commune
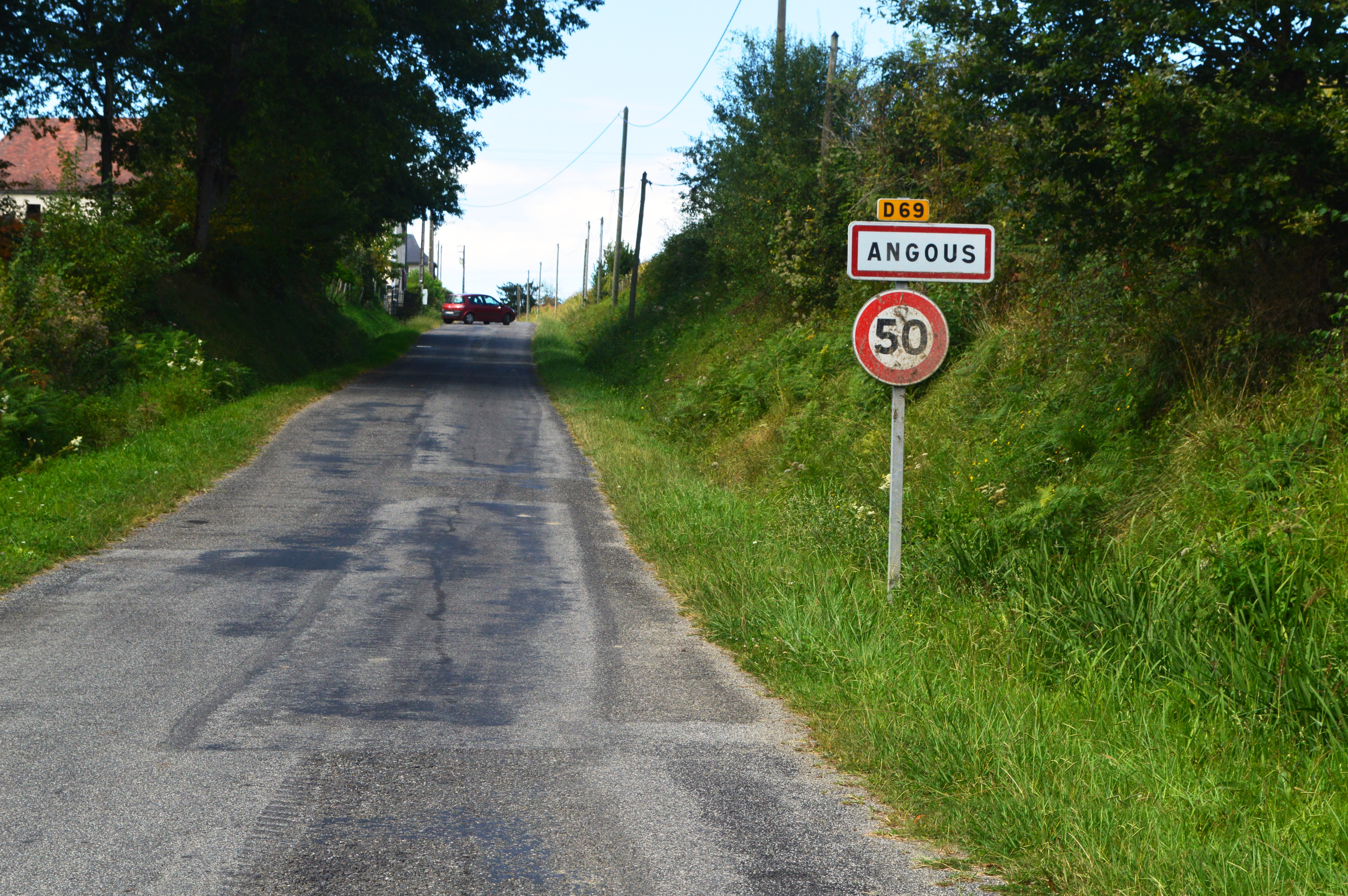
- The road into Angous
- Location of Angous
- Location within France Location within Nouvelle-Aquitaine
- Coordinates: 43°17′41″N 0°48′45″W
- Country: France
- Region: Nouvelle-Aquitaine
- Department: Pyrénées-Atlantiques
- Arrondissement: Oloron-Sainte-Marie
- Canton: Le Cœur de Béarn
- Intercommunality: Béarn des Gaves

Government
  - Mayor (2020–2026): Francis Lansalot-Matras
- Area^{1}: 6.22 km^{2} (2.40 sq mi)
- Elevation: 177 m (581 ft)
- Highest elevation: 262 m (860 ft)
- Lowest elevation: 133 m (436 ft)
- Population (2023): 96
  - Density: 15/km^{2} (40/sq mi)
- Time zone: UTC+01:00 (CET)
  - Summer (DST): UTC+02:00 (CEST)
- INSEE/Postal code: 64025 /64190
- ^{1} French Land Register data, which excludes lakes, ponds, glaciers > 1 km^{2} (0.386 sq mi or 247 acres) and river estuaries.

Angous (French pronunciation: [ɑ̃ɡus]; Occitan: Angós) is a commune in the Pyrénées-Atlantiques department in the Nouvelle-Aquitaine region of southwestern France.

== Geography ==
Angous is located some 5 km south-west of Navarrenx and 12 km north-east of Mauléon-Licharre. It can be accessed by the D2 road which runs from Navarrenx and forms the south-eastern border of the commune before continuing to Moncayolle-Larrory-Mendibieu. Access to the village is by the D69 road which runs off the D2 to the village. The commune consists of mainly farmland with patches of forest.

Located on the watershed of the Adour, the Serrot, a tributary of the Lausset, with many tributaries flows through the commune from south-west to north-east passing near the village. The Ruisseau de Lassere with many tributaries also flows from the south-west towards the northeast to the east of the village and forms part of the eastern border.

=== Places and Hamlets ===
- Beigbédé
- Bestit
- Bois de Carrié
- Bonnehoun
- Bordenave
- Cabane
- Caillau
- Carrié
- Chincas
- Claverie
- Denis
- Jaquet
- Labadie
- Labatut
- Labourdette
- Lagrave
- Lahaderne
- Larrieu
- Lartigue
- Lauga
- Ligaray
- Maréchal
- Miranda
- Mirassou
- Montjoye
- Mouliet
- Nabarre (ruins)
- Olive
- Parfouby
- Poumirau
- Pucheu
- Serbielle
- Serrot
- Trouilh

== Toponymy ==
The commune name in Gascon is Angós which means "marshy terrain" according to Michel Grosclaude and Brigitte Jobbé-Duval

The following table details the origins of the commune name and other names in the commune.

Name	Spelling	Date	Source	Page	Origin	Description
Angous	Angos	1385	Raymond	6	Census	Village
	Anguos	1548	Raymond	6	Reformation	
	Saint-André d'Angous	1673	Raymond	6	Insinuations	
	Angous	1750	Cassini			
	Angoust	1793	Ldh/EHESS/Cassini			
	Angons	1801	Ldh/EHESS/Cassini		Bulletin des Lois	
Caillau	Caillau	1863	Raymond	39		Fief
Dalen	Dalen	1863	Raymond	54		Farm
Les Navailles	Navaillez	1366	Raymond	121	Chapter of Navailles	Hamlet, former commune founded in 1366
	Los Nabalhes	1385	Raymond	121	Census	
	Los Navalhees d'Angos	1412	Raymond	121	Notaries	
	Los quoate Nabalhes	1538	Raymond	121	Reformation	
	Les Navaillès	1593	Raymond	121	Angous	
Les Randuches	Les Randuches	1366	Raymond	141	Chapter of Navailles	Hamlet
Serbielle	Serviele	1385	Raymond	160	Census	Farm
	Servielle	1863	Raymond	160		
Serrot	Serrot	1863	Raymond	160	Census	Hamlet

Sources:

- Raymond: Topographic Dictionary of the Department of Basses-Pyrenees, 1863, on the page numbers indicated in the table. (in French)
- Grosclaude: Toponymic Dictionary of communes, Béarn, 2006 (in French)
- Cassini: Cassini Map from 1750
- Ldh/EHESS/Cassini: Des villages de Cassini aux communes d'aujourd'hui: Commune data sheet Angous, EHESS (in French).

Origins:

- Census: Census of Béarn
- Reformation: Reformation of Béarn
- Insinuations: Insinuations of the Diocese of Oloron
- Notaries: Notaries of Navarrenx
- Angous: Titles of Angous.

== History ==
Paul Raymond noted on page 6 of the 1863 dictionary that the commune had a Lay Abbey, a vassal of the Viscount of Béarn. In 1385 there were 12 fires in Angous and it depended on the bailiwick of Navarrenx.

The barony of Gabaston, a vassal of the Viscount of Béarn, was made up of Angous, Navailles, and Susmiou.

== Administration ==
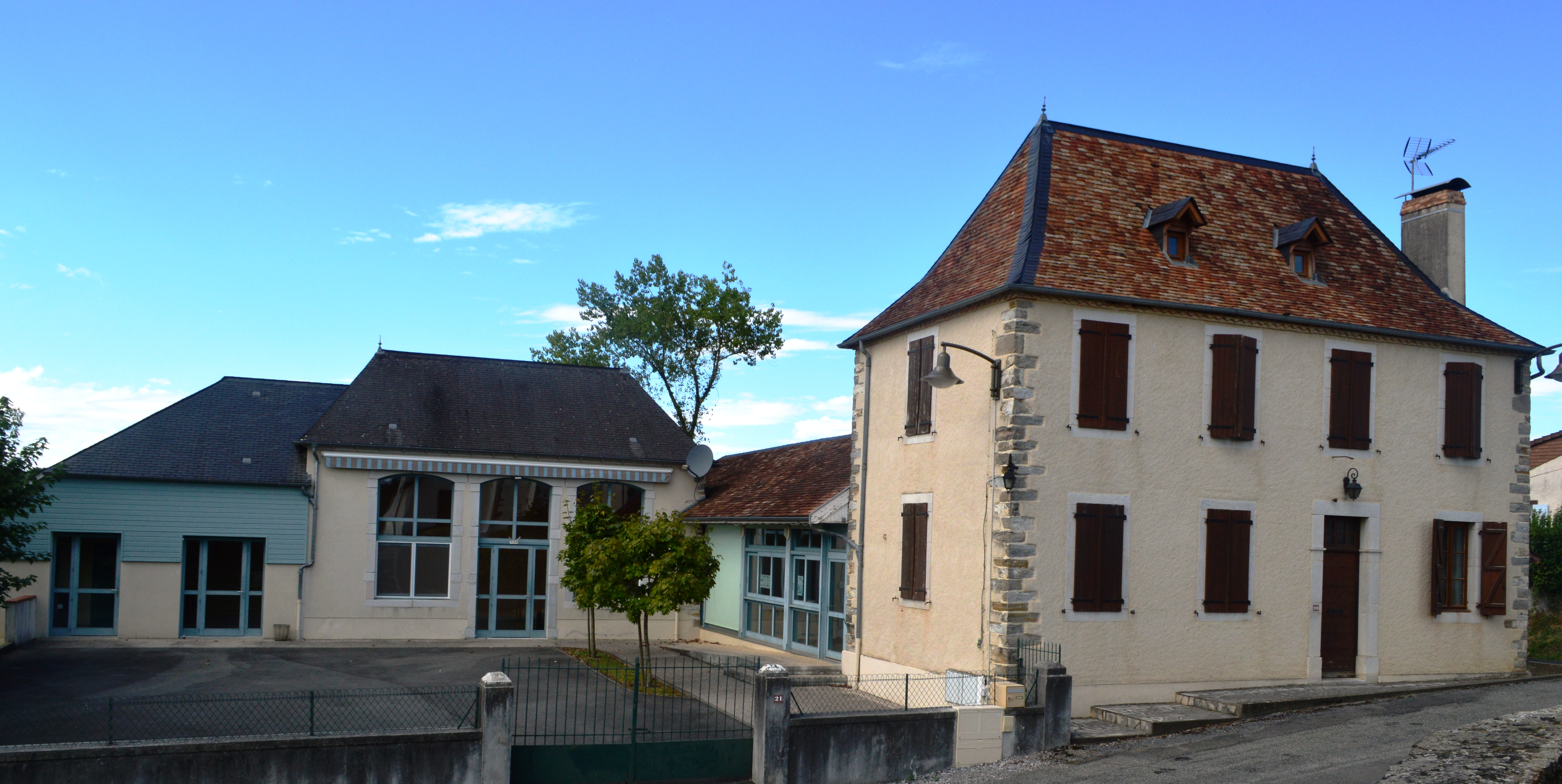
Angous School

List of Successive Mayors

From	To	Name
1995	2001	David Layous
2001	2008	Roger Eyheremendy
2008	2026	Francis Lansalot-Matras

=== Inter-communality ===
The commune is part of six inter-communal structures:

- the Communauté de communes du Béarn des Gaves;
- the inter-communal association for Gaves and of Saleys;
- the mixed forestry association for the oak groves in the Basque and béarnais valleys;
- the collection association of Navarrenx;
- the AEP association of Navarrenx;
- the energy association of Pyrénées-Atlantiques.

== Demography ==
The inhabitants of the commune are known as Angousiens or Angousiennes in French.

Historical population

Year	Pop.	±% p.a.
1793	342	—
1821	352	+0.10%
1846	382	+0.33%
1872	291	−1.04%
1901	273	−0.22%
1926	249	−0.37%
1946	214	−0.75%
1962	196	−0.55%
1968	158	−3.53%

Year	Pop.	±% p.a.
1975	151	−0.65%
1982	129	−2.22%
1990	121	−0.80%
1999	111	−0.95%
2007	100	−1.30%
2012	114	+2.66%
2017	102	−2.20%
2023	96	−1.01%

Source: EHESS and INSEE

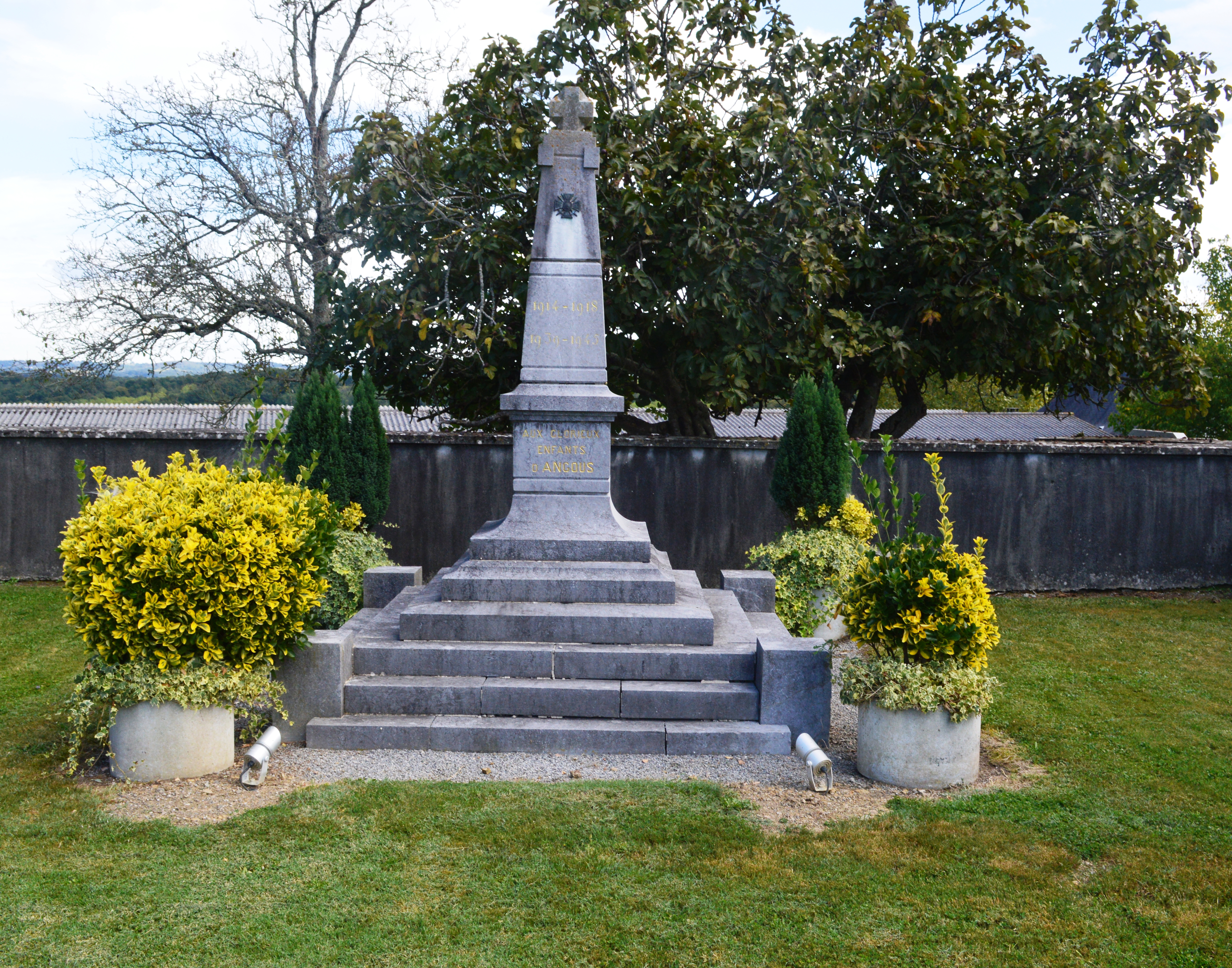
Angous War Memorial

== Economy ==
The activity is directed mainly towards agriculture (livestock grazing, market gardening, and horticultural crops). The town is part of the Appellation d'origine contrôlée (AOC) zone of Ossau-iraty.

== Culture and Heritage ==
=== Religious heritage ===
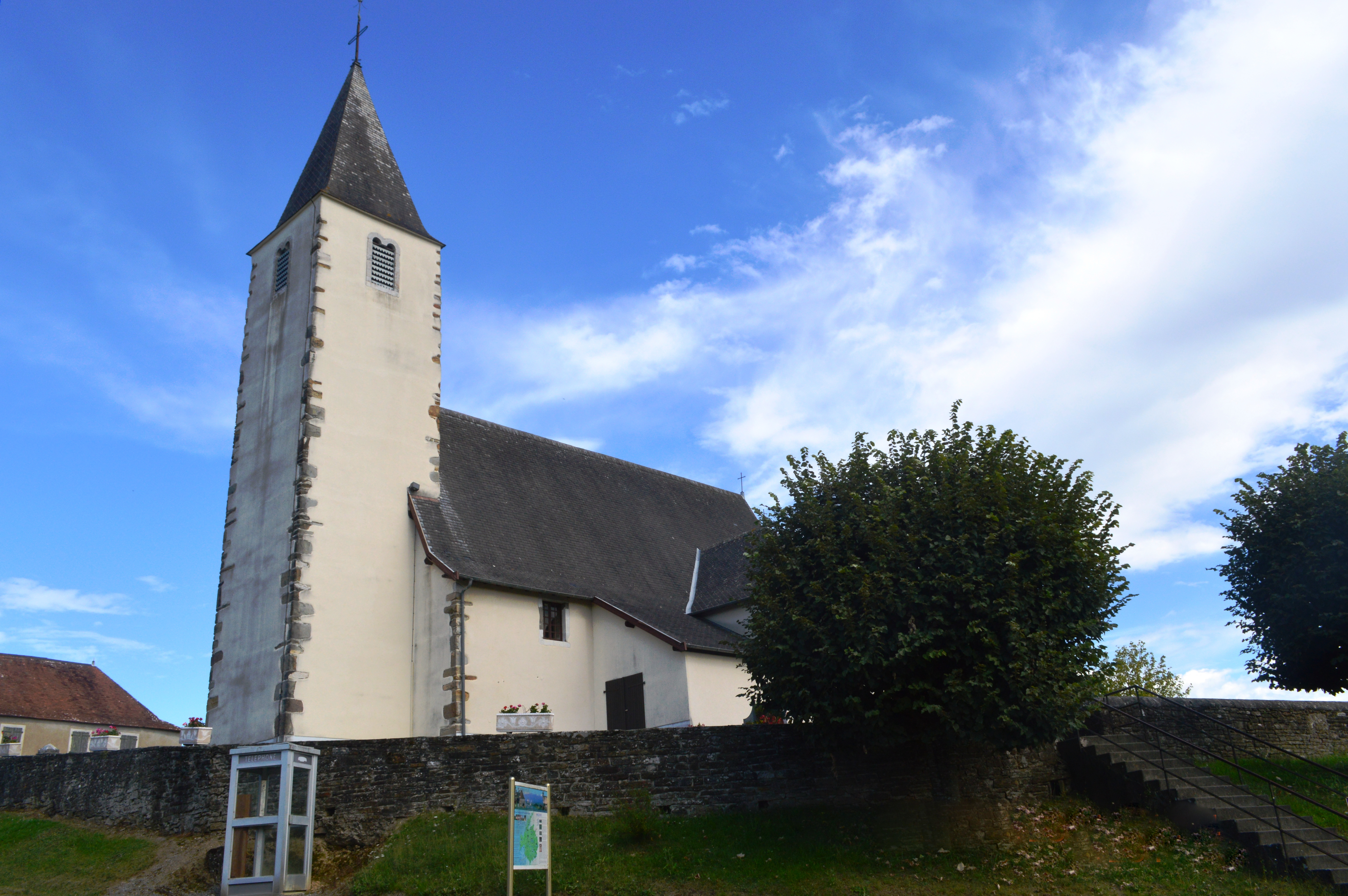
The Church of Saint-André

The Parish Church of Saint-André (1847) is registered as an historical monument.

Church Gallery

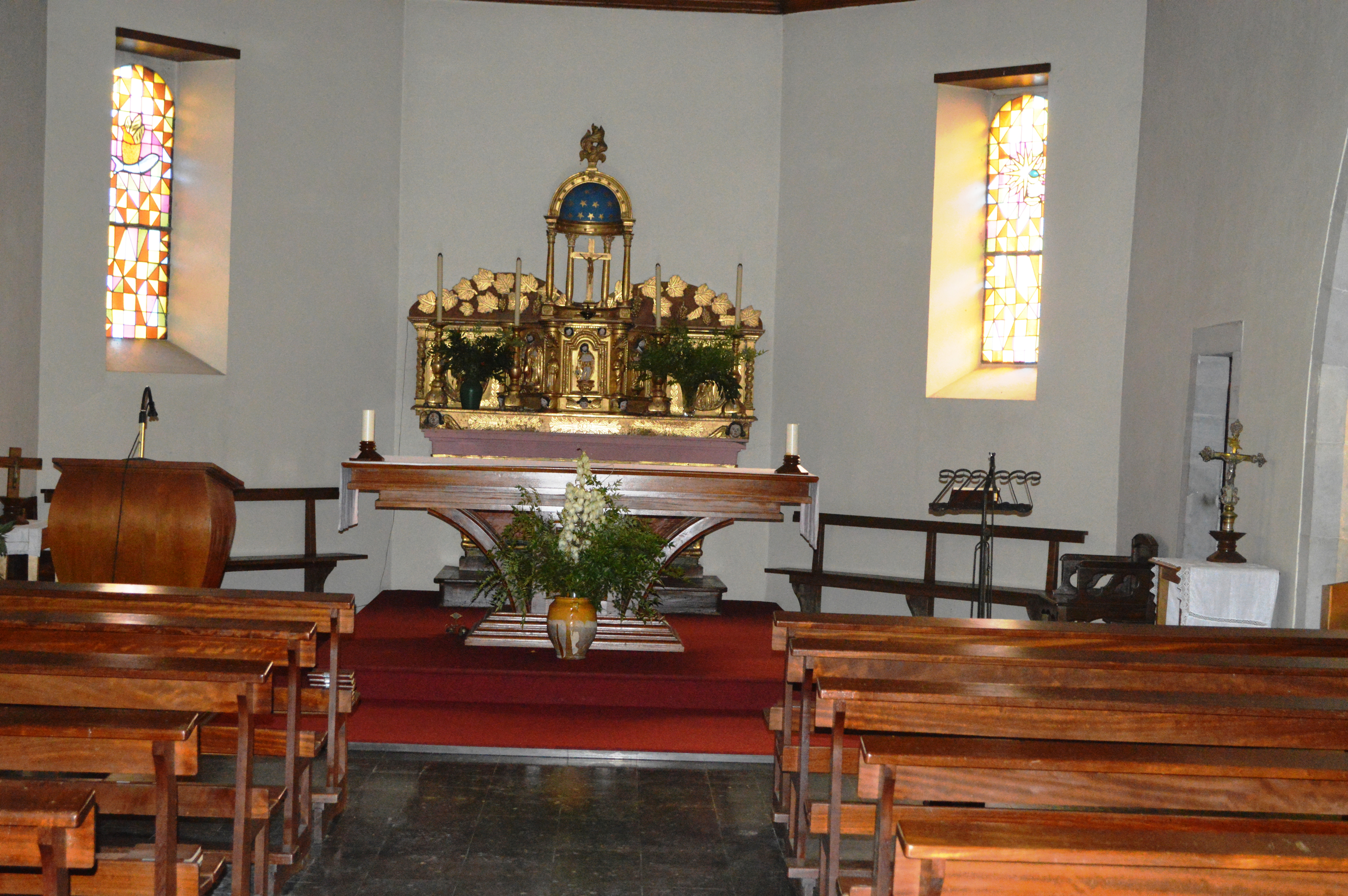
Church Interior

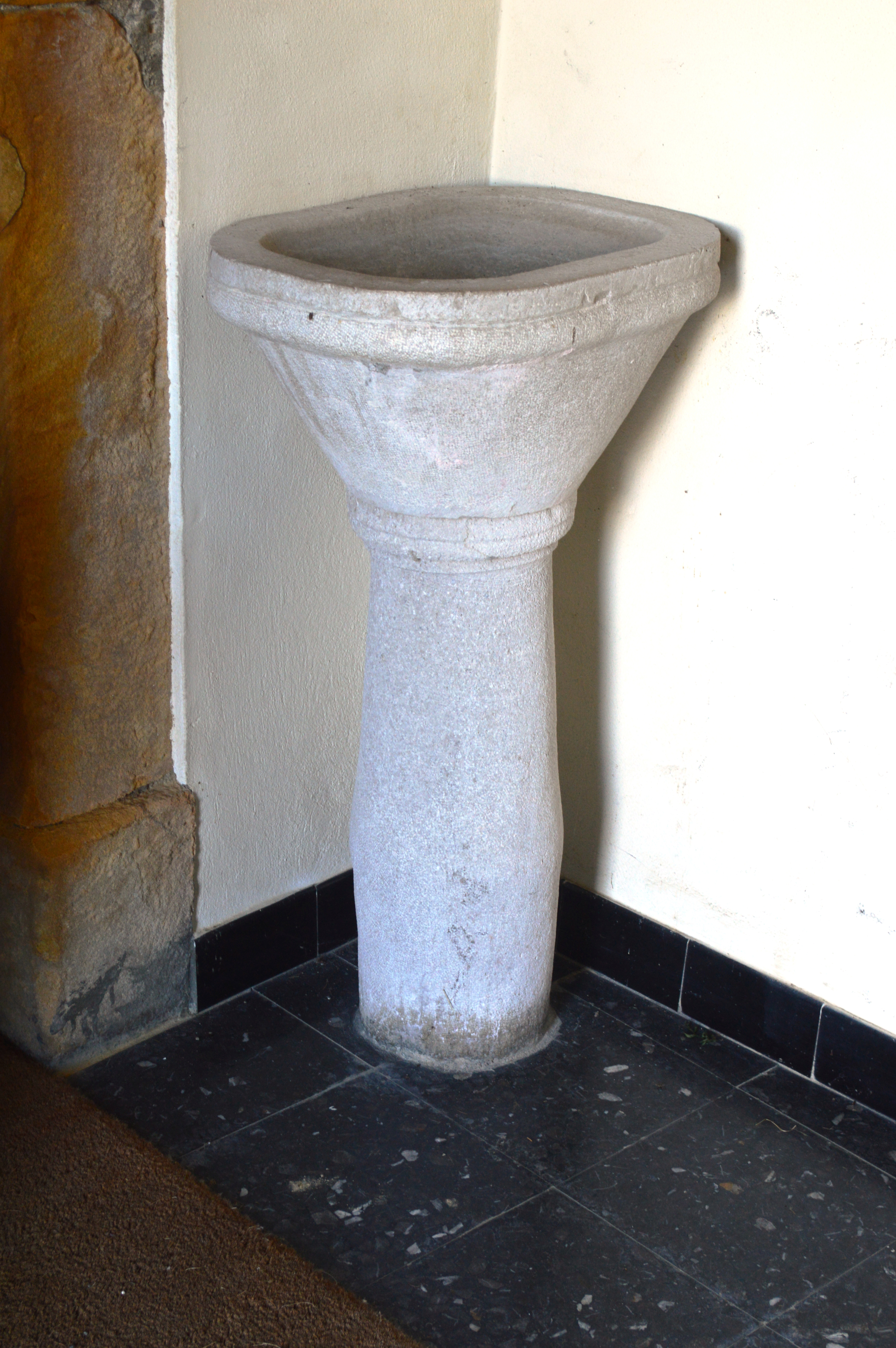
Baptismal Font

The sect Tabitha's place has a property of eleven hectares in the commune.

== See also ==
- Communes of the Pyrénées-Atlantiques department
