= Canton of Le Cœur de Béarn =

Coordinates: 43.37°N 0.63°W

The canton of Le Cœur de Béarn is an administrative division of the Pyrénées-Atlantiques department, southwestern France. It was created at the French canton reorganisation which came into effect in March 2015. Its seat is in Mourenx.

It consists of the following communes:

1. Abidos
2. Abos
3. Angous
4. Araujuzon
5. Araux
6. Audaux
7. Bastanès
8. Bésingrand
9. Biron
10. Bugnein
11. Cardesse
12. Castetnau-Camblong
13. Castetner
14. Charre
15. Cuqueron
16. Dognen
17. Gestas
18. Gurs
19. Jasses
20. Laà-Mondrans
21. Lacommande
22. Lagor
23. Lahourcade
24. Lay-Lamidou
25. Loubieng
26. Lucq-de-Béarn
27. Maslacq
28. Méritein
29. Monein
30. Mourenx
31. Nabas
32. Navarrenx
33. Noguères
34. Ogenne-Camptort
35. Os-Marsillon
36. Ozenx-Montestrucq
37. Parbayse
38. Pardies
39. Préchacq-Navarrenx
40. Rivehaute
41. Sarpourenx
42. Sauvelade
43. Sus
44. Susmiou
45. Tarsacq
46. Viellenave-de-Navarrenx
47. Vielleségure
