= Laà-Mondrans =

- Commune
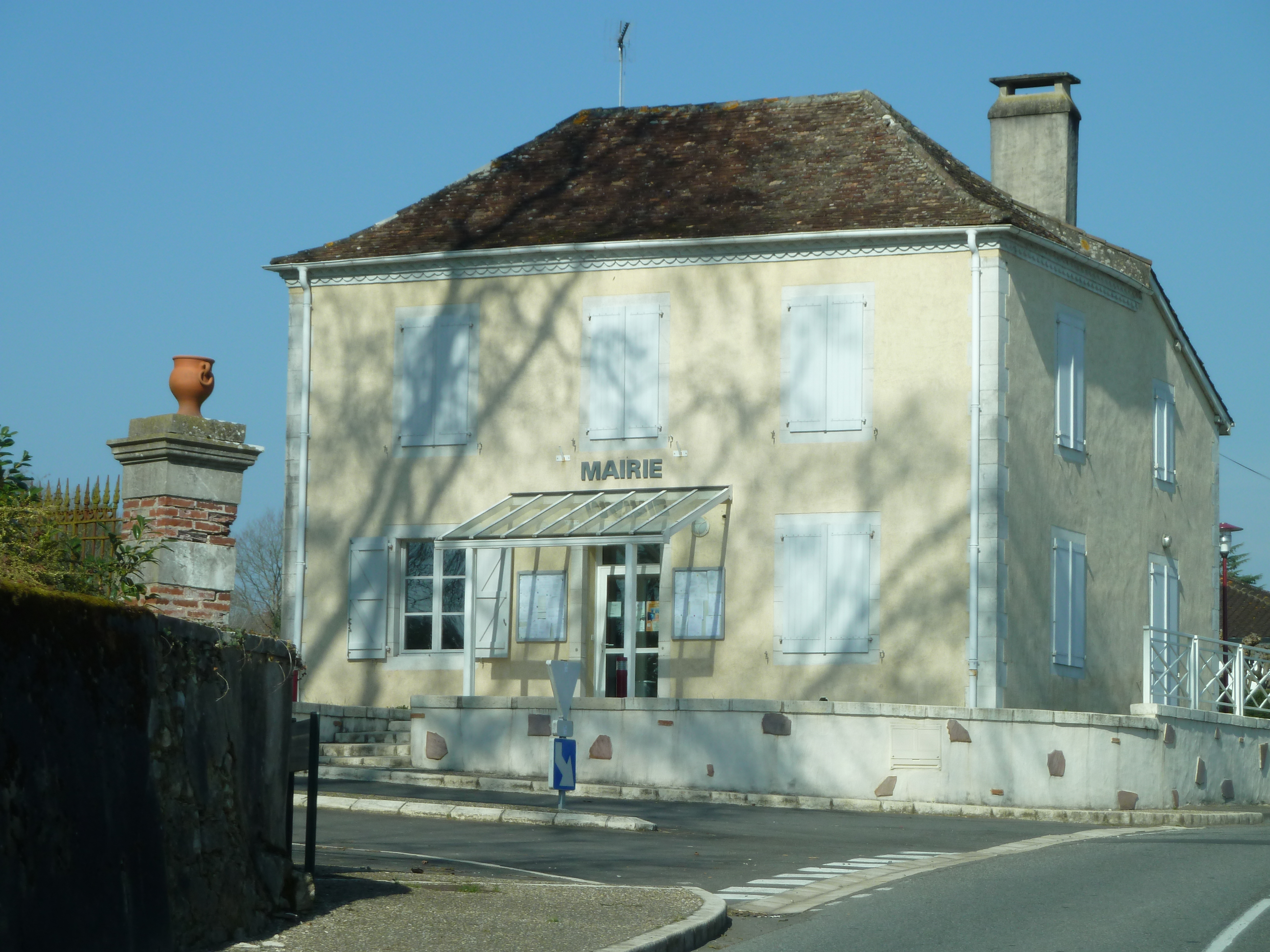
- The town hall of Laà-Mondrans
- Location of Laà-Mondrans
- Location within France Location within Nouvelle-Aquitaine
- Coordinates: 43°27′09″N 0°46′20″W
- Country: France
- Region: Nouvelle-Aquitaine
- Department: Pyrénées-Atlantiques
- Arrondissement: Pau
- Canton: Le Cœur de Béarn
- Intercommunality: Lacq-Orthez

Government
  - Mayor (2020–2026): Loïc Coutry
- Area^{1}: 6.10 km^{2} (2.36 sq mi)
- Elevation: 101 m (331 ft)
- Highest elevation: 174 m (571 ft)
- Lowest elevation: 63 m (207 ft)
- Population (2023): 423
  - Density: 69.3/km^{2} (180/sq mi)
- Time zone: UTC+01:00 (CET)
  - Summer (DST): UTC+02:00 (CEST)
- INSEE/Postal code: 64286 /64300
- ^{1} French Land Register data, which excludes lakes, ponds, glaciers > 1 km^{2} (0.386 sq mi or 247 acres) and river estuaries.

Laà-Mondrans (Occitan: Ici) is a commune in the Pyrénées-Atlantiques department in south-western France.

== See also ==
- Communes of the Pyrénées-Atlantiques department
