= Rivehaute =

- Commune
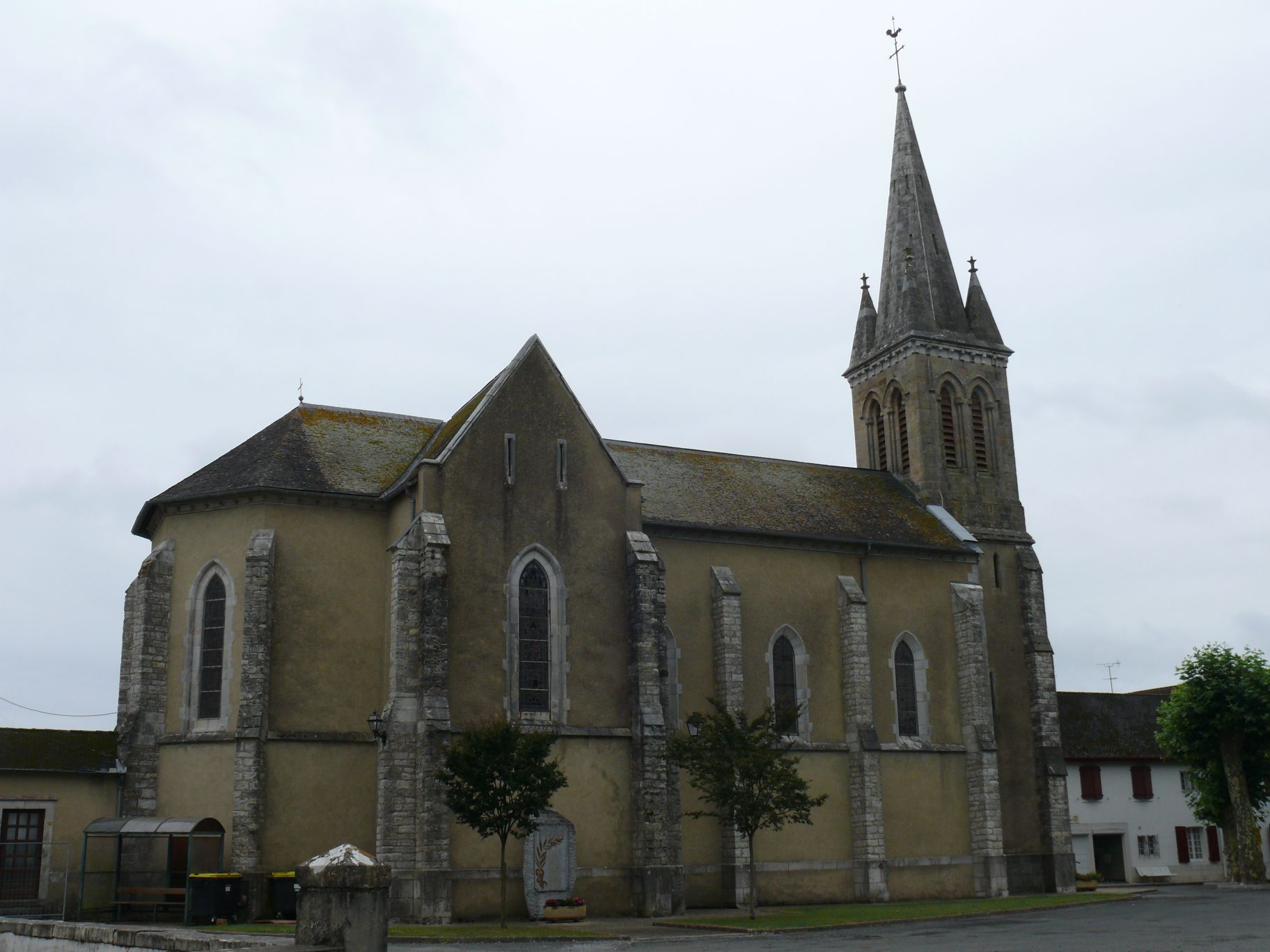
- The church of Rivehaute
- Location of Rivehaute
- Location within France Location within Nouvelle-Aquitaine
- Coordinates: 43°20′38″N 0°52′41″W
- Country: France
- Region: Nouvelle-Aquitaine
- Department: Pyrénées-Atlantiques
- Arrondissement: Oloron-Sainte-Marie
- Canton: Le Cœur de Béarn

Government
  - Mayor (2020–2026): Marcel Montegut
- Area^{1}: 8.41 km^{2} (3.25 sq mi)
- Elevation: 110 m (360 ft)
- Highest elevation: 212 m (696 ft)
- Lowest elevation: 79 m (259 ft)
- Population (2023): 271
  - Density: 32.2/km^{2} (83.5/sq mi)
- Time zone: UTC+01:00 (CET)
  - Summer (DST): UTC+02:00 (CEST)
- INSEE/Postal code: 64466 /64190
- ^{1} French Land Register data, which excludes lakes, ponds, glaciers > 1 km^{2} (0.386 sq mi or 247 acres) and river estuaries.

Rivehaute (French pronunciation: [ʁiv(ə)ot]; Occitan: Ribahauta) is a commune in the Pyrénées-Atlantiques department in south-western France.

== See also ==
- Communes of the Pyrénées-Atlantiques department
