= Préchacq-Navarrenx =

- Commune
- Location of Préchacq-Navarrenx
- Location within France Location within Nouvelle-Aquitaine
- Coordinates: 43°16′N 0°43′W
- Country: France
- Region: Nouvelle-Aquitaine
- Department: Pyrénées-Atlantiques
- Arrondissement: Oloron-Sainte-Marie
- Canton: Le Cœur de Béarn
- Intercommunality: Béarn des Gaves

Government
  - Mayor (2020–2026): Florent Laborde
- Area^{1}: 5.10 km^{2} (1.97 sq mi)
- Elevation: 175 m (574 ft)
- Highest elevation: 262 m (860 ft)
- Lowest elevation: 139 m (456 ft)
- Population (2023): 178
  - Density: 34.9/km^{2} (90.4/sq mi)
- Time zone: UTC+01:00 (CET)
  - Summer (DST): UTC+02:00 (CEST)
- INSEE/Postal code: 64459 /64190
- ^{1} French Land Register data, which excludes lakes, ponds, glaciers > 1 km^{2} (0.386 sq mi or 247 acres) and river estuaries.

Préchacq-Navarrenx (French pronunciation: [pʁeʃak navaʁɛ̃ks]; Occitan: Preishac de Navarrencs) is a commune in the Pyrénées-Atlantiques department in south-western France.

== See also ==
- Communes of the Pyrénées-Atlantiques department
