= Castetnau-Camblong =

- Commune
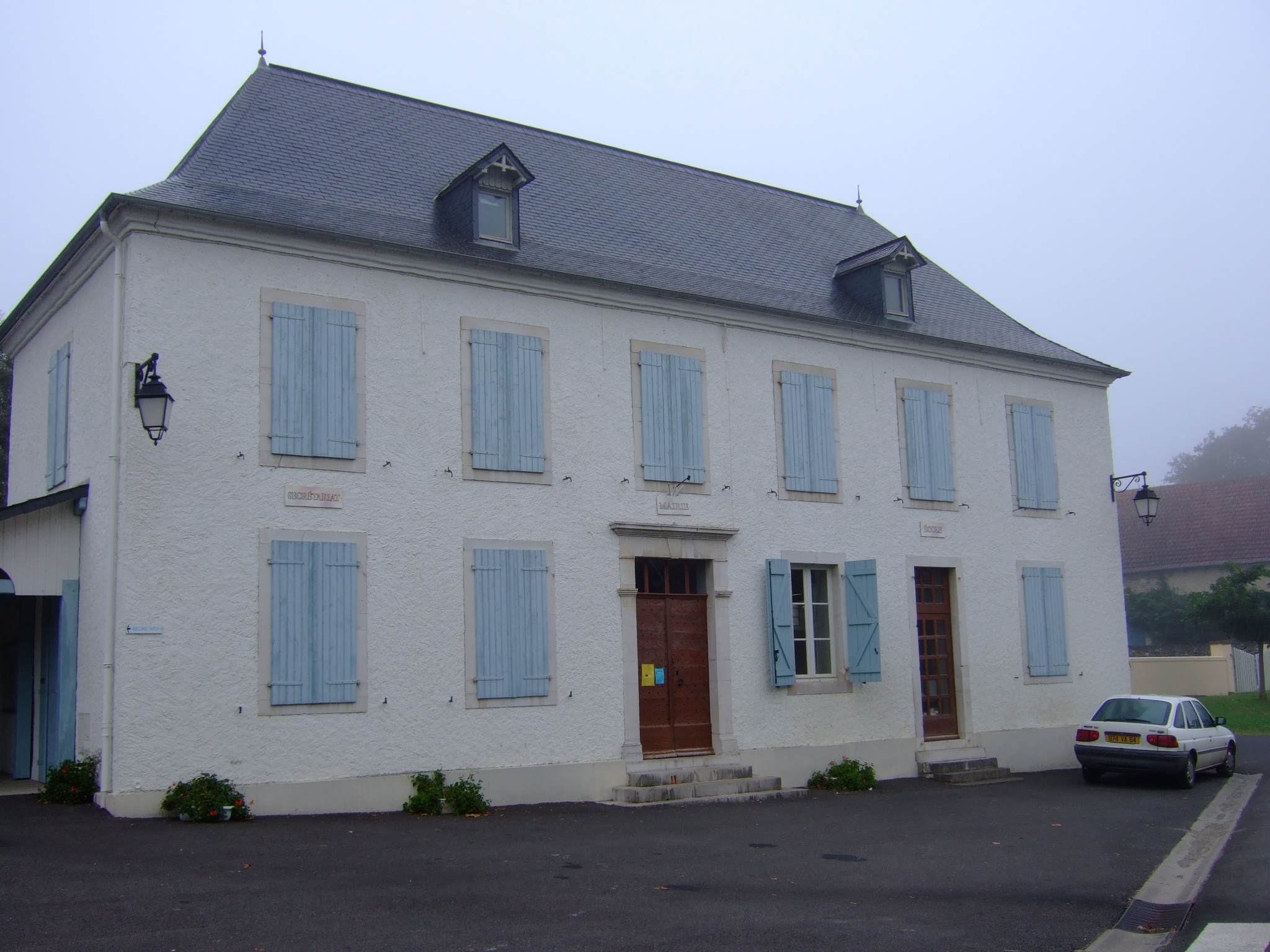
- The town hall of Castetnau-Camblong
- Location of Castetnau-Camblong
- Location within France Location within Nouvelle-Aquitaine
- Coordinates: 43°19′40″N 0°46′52″W
- Country: France
- Region: Nouvelle-Aquitaine
- Department: Pyrénées-Atlantiques
- Arrondissement: Oloron-Sainte-Marie
- Canton: Le Cœur de Béarn
- Intercommunality: Béarn des Gaves

Government
  - Mayor (2020–2026): Patrick Baldan
- Area^{1}: 11.37 km^{2} (4.39 sq mi)
- Elevation: 136 m (446 ft)
- Highest elevation: 207 m (679 ft)
- Lowest elevation: 98 m (322 ft)
- Population (2023): 460
  - Density: 40/km^{2} (100/sq mi)
- Time zone: UTC+01:00 (CET)
  - Summer (DST): UTC+02:00 (CEST)
- INSEE/Postal code: 64178 /64190
- ^{1} French Land Register data, which excludes lakes, ponds, glaciers > 1 km^{2} (0.386 sq mi or 247 acres) and river estuaries.

Castetnau-Camblong (French pronunciation: [kastɛtno kɑ̃blɔ̃]; Occitan: Castèthnau e Camplong) is a commune in the Pyrénées-Atlantiques department in south-western France.

== See also ==
- Communes of the Pyrénées-Atlantiques department
