= Dognen =

- Commune
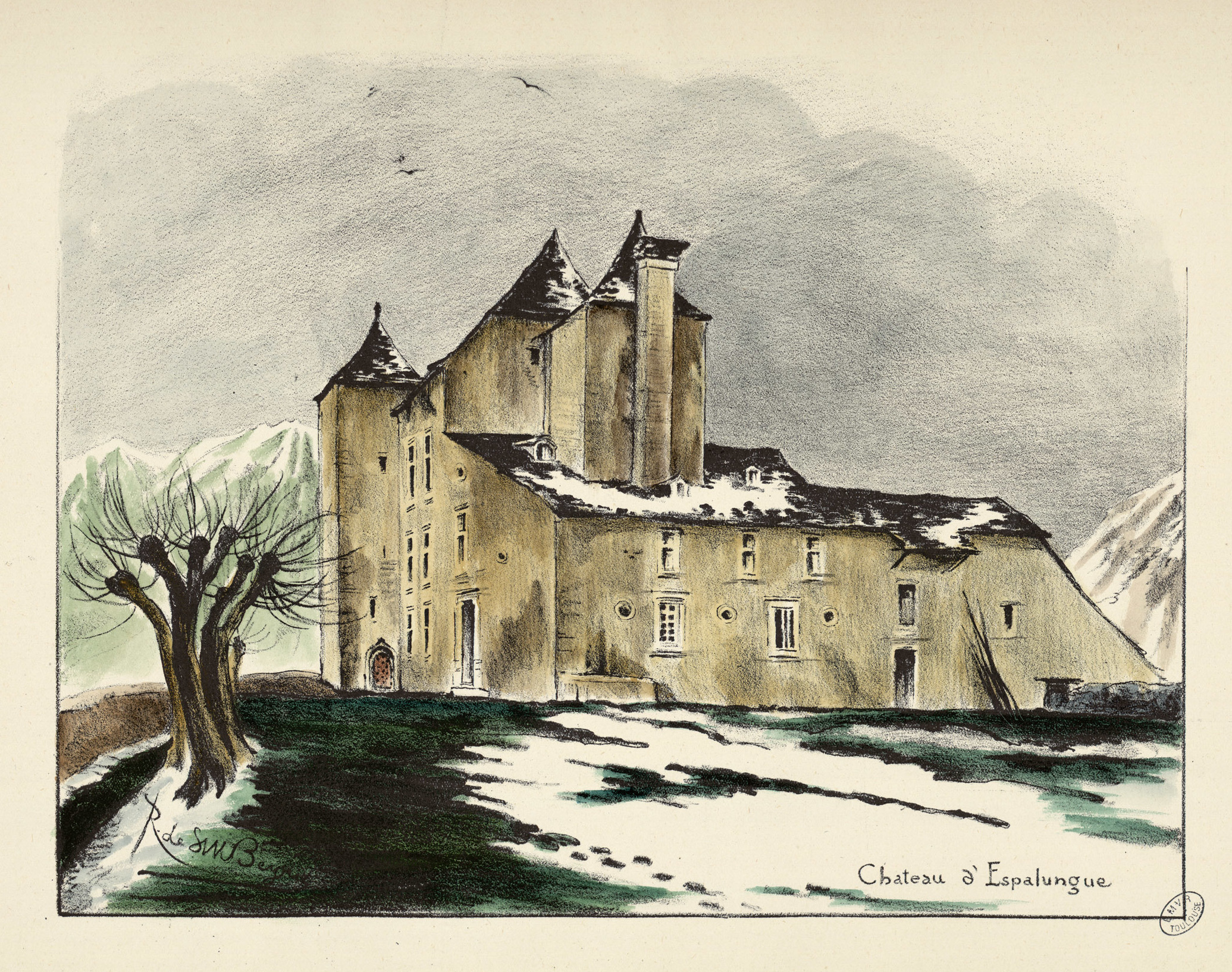
- The château of Espalungue
- Location of Dognen
- Location within France Location within Nouvelle-Aquitaine
- Coordinates: 43°17′34″N 0°44′22″W
- Country: France
- Region: Nouvelle-Aquitaine
- Department: Pyrénées-Atlantiques
- Arrondissement: Oloron-Sainte-Marie
- Canton: Le Cœur de Béarn
- Intercommunality: Béarn des Gaves

Government
  - Mayor (2020–2026): Patrick Gourriet
- Area^{1}: 6.79 km^{2} (2.62 sq mi)
- Elevation: 148 m (486 ft)
- Highest elevation: 223 m (732 ft)
- Lowest elevation: 120 m (390 ft)
- Population (2023): 225
  - Density: 33.1/km^{2} (85.8/sq mi)
- Time zone: UTC+01:00 (CET)
  - Summer (DST): UTC+02:00 (CEST)
- INSEE/Postal code: 64201 /64190
- ^{1} French Land Register data, which excludes lakes, ponds, glaciers > 1 km^{2} (0.386 sq mi or 247 acres) and river estuaries.

Dognen (French pronunciation: [dɔɲɛ̃]; Occitan: Dònhen) is a commune in the Pyrénées-Atlantiques department in south-western France.

== See also ==
- Communes of the Pyrénées-Atlantiques department
