= Lay-Lamidou =

- Commune
- Location of Lay-Lamidou
- Location within France Location within Nouvelle-Aquitaine
- Coordinates: 43°17′33″N 0°43′10″W
- Country: France
- Region: Nouvelle-Aquitaine
- Department: Pyrénées-Atlantiques
- Arrondissement: Oloron-Sainte-Marie
- Canton: Le Cœur de Béarn
- Intercommunality: Béarn des Gaves

Government
  - Mayor (2020–2026): Joël Sartolou
- Area^{1}: 5.47 km^{2} (2.11 sq mi)
- Elevation: 175 m (574 ft)
- Highest elevation: 266 m (873 ft)
- Lowest elevation: 146 m (479 ft)
- Population (2023): 130
  - Density: 24/km^{2} (62/sq mi)
- Time zone: UTC+01:00 (CET)
  - Summer (DST): UTC+02:00 (CEST)
- INSEE/Postal code: 64326 /64190
- ^{1} French Land Register data, which excludes lakes, ponds, glaciers > 1 km^{2} (0.386 sq mi or 247 acres) and river estuaries.

Lay-Lamidou (French pronunciation: [laj lamidu]; Occitan: Lai e Lamidon) is a commune in the Pyrénées-Atlantiques department in south-western France.

== See also ==
- Communes of the Pyrénées-Atlantiques department
