= Ogenne-Camptort =

- Commune
- Location of Ogenne-Camptort
- Location within France Location within Nouvelle-Aquitaine
- Coordinates: 43°18′48″N 0°42′05″W
- Country: France
- Region: Nouvelle-Aquitaine
- Department: Pyrénées-Atlantiques
- Arrondissement: Oloron-Sainte-Marie
- Canton: Le Cœur de Béarn
- Intercommunality: Béarn des Gaves

Government
  - Mayor (2020–2026): Sébastien Lapeyre
- Area^{1}: 11.81 km^{2} (4.56 sq mi)
- Elevation: 264 m (866 ft)
- Highest elevation: 290 m (950 ft)
- Lowest elevation: 157 m (515 ft)
- Population (2023): 241
  - Density: 20.4/km^{2} (52.9/sq mi)
- Time zone: UTC+01:00 (CET)
  - Summer (DST): UTC+02:00 (CEST)
- INSEE/Postal code: 64420 /64190
- ^{1} French Land Register data, which excludes lakes, ponds, glaciers > 1 km^{2} (0.386 sq mi or 247 acres) and river estuaries.

Ogenne-Camptort (French pronunciation: [ɔʒɛn kɑ̃ptɔʁ]; Occitan: Augèna-Camptòrt) is a commune in the Pyrénées-Atlantiques department in south-western France.

== See also ==
- Communes of the Pyrénées-Atlantiques department
