= Tarsacq =

- Commune
- Location of Tarsacq
- Location within France Location within Nouvelle-Aquitaine
- Coordinates: 43°21′31″N 0°32′12″W
- Country: France
- Region: Nouvelle-Aquitaine
- Department: Pyrénées-Atlantiques
- Arrondissement: Pau
- Canton: Le Cœur de Béarn
- Intercommunality: Lacq-Orthez

Government
  - Mayor (2020–2026): Maithé Mirassou
- Area^{1}: 4.23 km^{2} (1.63 sq mi)
- Elevation: 205 m (673 ft)
- Highest elevation: 261 m (856 ft)
- Lowest elevation: 116 m (381 ft)
- Population (2023): 548
  - Density: 130/km^{2} (336/sq mi)
- Time zone: UTC+01:00 (CET)
  - Summer (DST): UTC+02:00 (CEST)
- INSEE/Postal code: 64535 /64360
- ^{1} French Land Register data, which excludes lakes, ponds, glaciers > 1 km^{2} (0.386 sq mi or 247 acres) and river estuaries.

Tarsacq (French pronunciation: [taʁsak]; Occitan: Tarsac) is a commune in the Pyrénées-Atlantiques department in south-western France.

== See also ==
- Communes of the Pyrénées-Atlantiques department
