= Ozenx-Montestrucq =

- Commune
- Location of Ozenx-Montestrucq
- Location within France Location within Nouvelle-Aquitaine
- Coordinates: 43°26′34″N 0°47′43″W
- Country: France
- Region: Nouvelle-Aquitaine
- Department: Pyrénées-Atlantiques
- Arrondissement: Pau
- Canton: Le Cœur de Béarn
- Intercommunality: Lacq-Orthez

Government
  - Mayor (2020–2026): Alain Lenglet
- Area^{1}: 16.34 km^{2} (6.31 sq mi)
- Elevation: 102 m (335 ft)
- Highest elevation: 188 m (617 ft)
- Lowest elevation: 69 m (226 ft)
- Population (2023): 372
  - Density: 22.8/km^{2} (59.0/sq mi)
- Time zone: UTC+01:00 (CET)
  - Summer (DST): UTC+02:00 (CEST)
- INSEE/Postal code: 64440 /64300
- ^{1} French Land Register data, which excludes lakes, ponds, glaciers > 1 km^{2} (0.386 sq mi or 247 acres) and river estuaries.

Ozenx-Montestrucq (French pronunciation: [ozɛ̃ks mɔ̃tɛstʁyk]; Occitan: Ausencs e Montestruc) is a commune in the Pyrénées-Atlantiques department in south-western France.

== See also ==
- Communes of the Pyrénées-Atlantiques department
