= Méritein =

- Commune
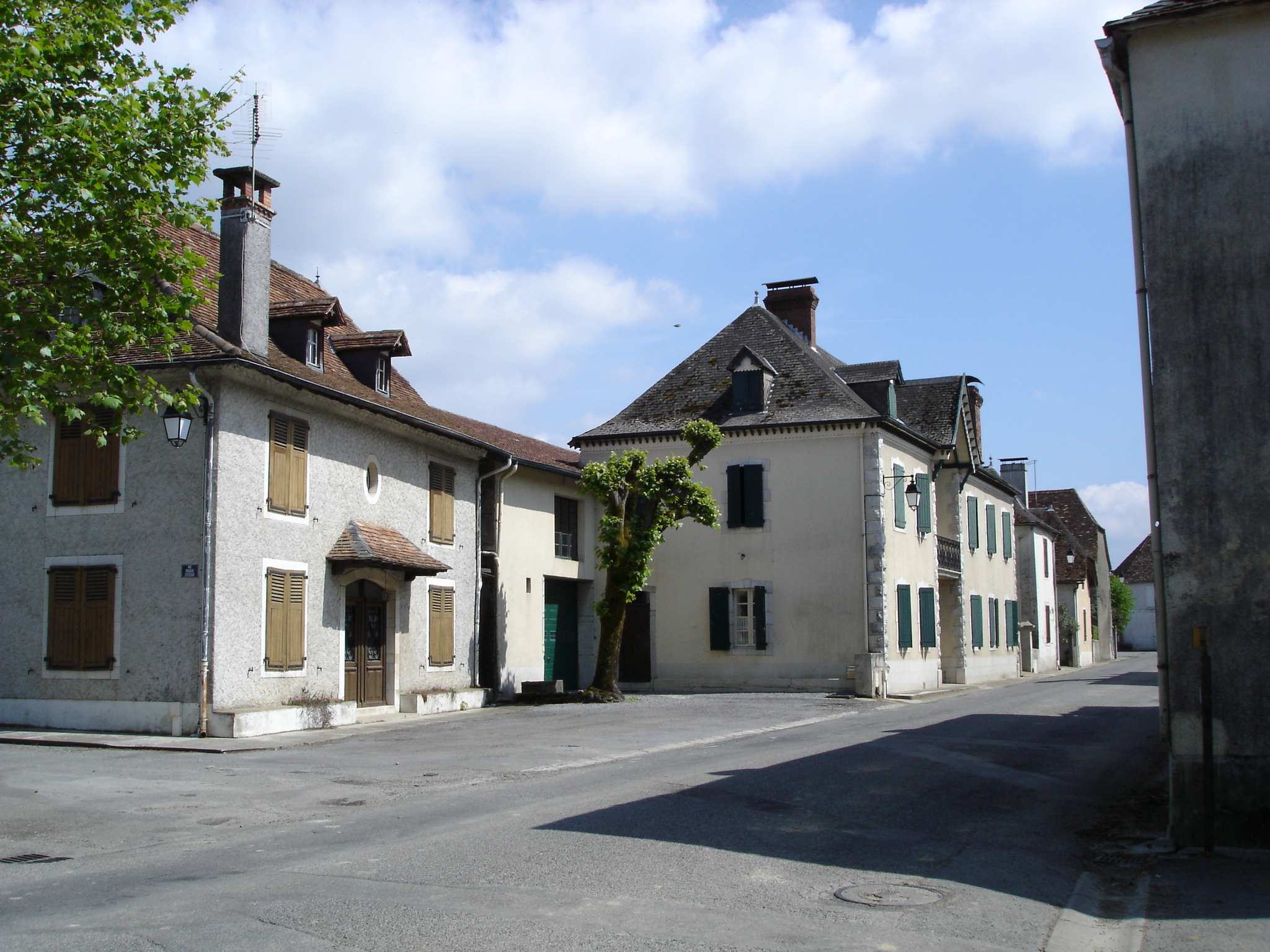
- A general view of Méritein
- Location of Méritein
- Location within France Location within Nouvelle-Aquitaine
- Coordinates: 43°20′10″N 0°45′47″W
- Country: France
- Region: Nouvelle-Aquitaine
- Department: Pyrénées-Atlantiques
- Arrondissement: Oloron-Sainte-Marie
- Canton: Le Cœur de Béarn
- Intercommunality: Béarn des Gaves

Government
  - Mayor (2020–2026): Jean-Baptiste Lendre
- Area^{1}: 6.90 km^{2} (2.66 sq mi)
- Elevation: 124 m (407 ft)
- Highest elevation: 269 m (883 ft)
- Lowest elevation: 94 m (308 ft)
- Population (2023): 279
  - Density: 40.4/km^{2} (105/sq mi)
- Time zone: UTC+01:00 (CET)
  - Summer (DST): UTC+02:00 (CEST)
- INSEE/Postal code: 64381 /64190
- ^{1} French Land Register data, which excludes lakes, ponds, glaciers > 1 km^{2} (0.386 sq mi or 247 acres) and river estuaries.

Méritein (French pronunciation: [meʁitɛ̃]; Occitan: Meritenh) is a commune in the Pyrénées-Atlantiques department in south-western France.

== See also ==
- Communes of the Pyrénées-Atlantiques department
