= Gestas, Pyrénées-Atlantiques =

Gestas Jestaze
- Commune
- Location of Gestas
- Location within France Location within Nouvelle-Aquitaine
- Coordinates: 43°21′00″N 0°53′09″W
- Country: France
- Region: Nouvelle-Aquitaine
- Department: Pyrénées-Atlantiques
- Arrondissement: Oloron-Sainte-Marie
- Canton: Le Cœur de Béarn

Government
  - Mayor (2020–2026): Maryvonne Lagaronne
- Area^{1}: 2.19 km^{2} (0.85 sq mi)
- Elevation: 110 m (360 ft)
- Highest elevation: 194 m (636 ft)
- Lowest elevation: 77 m (253 ft)
- Population (2023): 74
  - Density: 34/km^{2} (88/sq mi)
- Time zone: UTC+01:00 (CET)
  - Summer (DST): UTC+02:00 (CEST)
- INSEE/Postal code: 64242 /64190
- ^{1} French Land Register data, which excludes lakes, ponds, glaciers > 1 km^{2} (0.386 sq mi or 247 acres) and river estuaries.

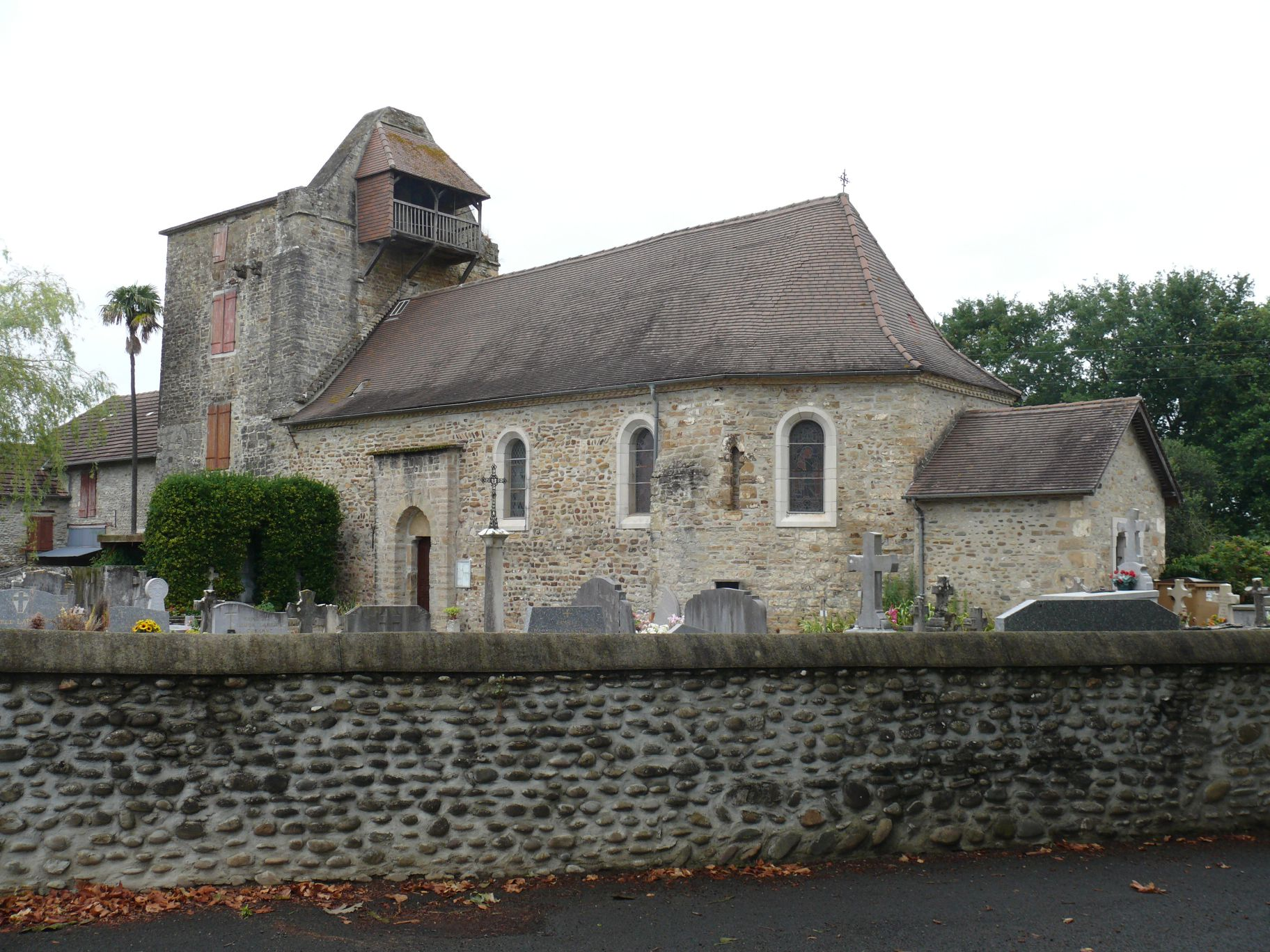
Gestas

Gestas (Basque: Jestaze) is a commune in the Pyrénées-Atlantiques department in south-western France.

It is located in the former province of Soule.

== See also ==
- Communes of the Pyrénées-Atlantiques department
