= Vielleségure =

- Commune
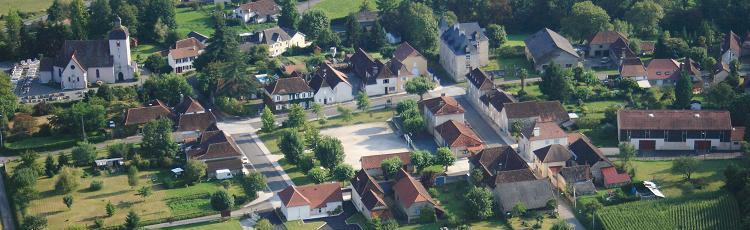
- An aerial view of Vielleségure

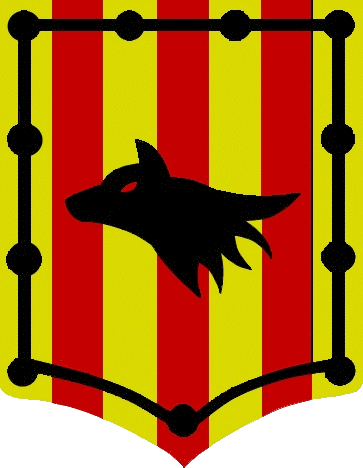
- Coat of arms
- Location of Vielleségure
- Location within France Location within Nouvelle-Aquitaine
- Coordinates: 43°21′27″N 0°40′58″W
- Country: France
- Region: Nouvelle-Aquitaine
- Department: Pyrénées-Atlantiques
- Arrondissement: Pau
- Canton: Le Cœur de Béarn
- Intercommunality: Lacq-Orthez

Government
  - Mayor (2020–2026): Philippe Arriau
- Area^{1}: 14.31 km^{2} (5.53 sq mi)
- Elevation: 250 m (820 ft)
- Highest elevation: 275 m (902 ft)
- Lowest elevation: 115 m (377 ft)
- Population (2023): 376
  - Density: 26.3/km^{2} (68.1/sq mi)
- Time zone: UTC+01:00 (CET)
  - Summer (DST): UTC+02:00 (CEST)
- INSEE/Postal code: 64556 /64150
- ^{1} French Land Register data, which excludes lakes, ponds, glaciers > 1 km^{2} (0.386 sq mi or 247 acres) and river estuaries.

Vielleségure is a commune in the Pyrénées-Atlantiques department in south-western France.

== See also ==
- Communes of the Pyrénées-Atlantiques department
