= Nabas, Pyrénées-Atlantiques =

Nabas
- Commune
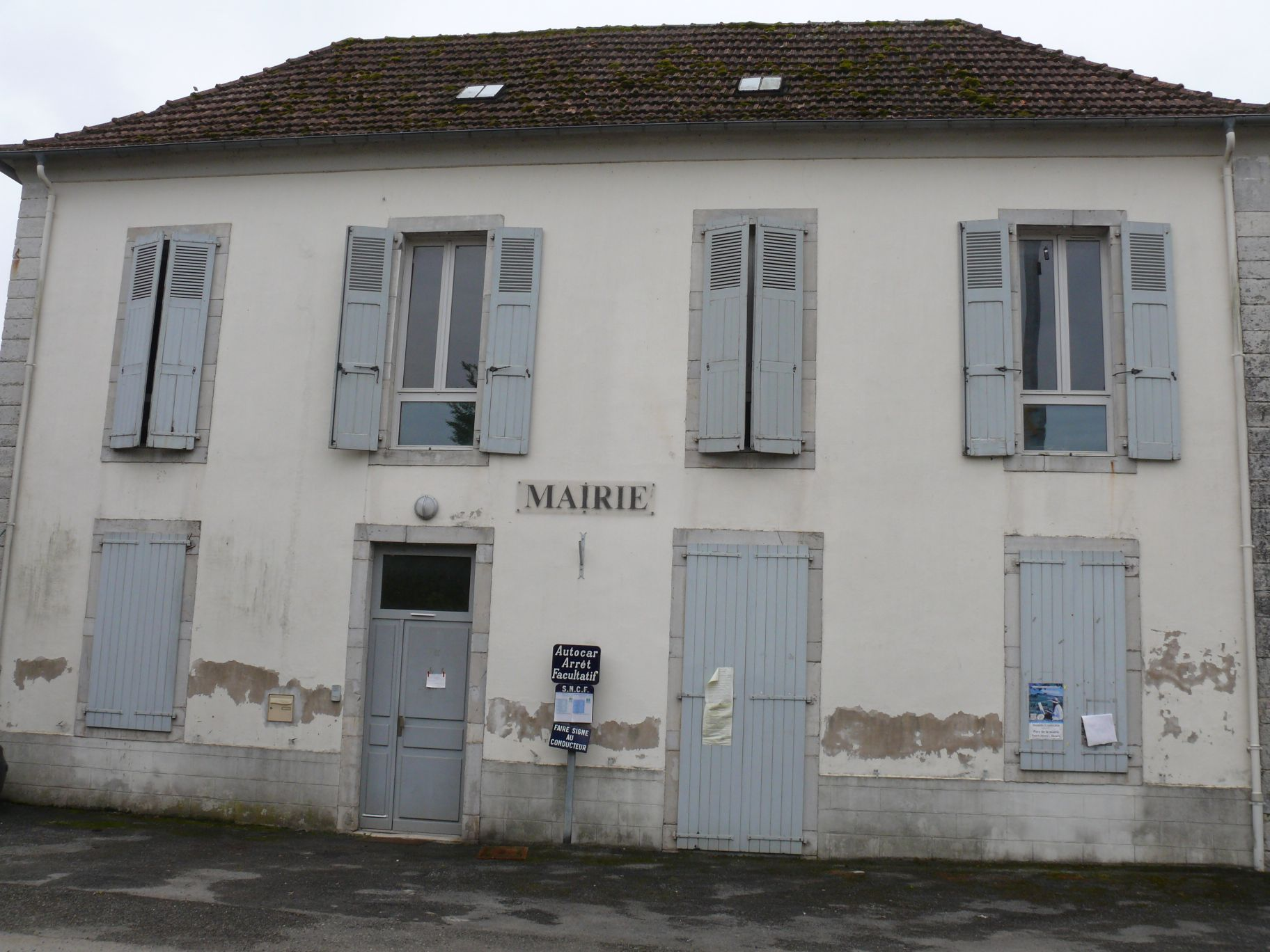
- The town hall of Nabas
- Location of Nabas
- Location within France Location within Nouvelle-Aquitaine
- Coordinates: 43°20′N 0°52′W
- Country: France
- Region: Nouvelle-Aquitaine
- Department: Pyrénées-Atlantiques
- Arrondissement: Oloron-Sainte-Marie
- Canton: Le Cœur de Béarn
- Intercommunality: Béarn des Gaves

Government
  - Mayor (2020–2026): Martine Hourcade
- Area^{1}: 6.40 km^{2} (2.47 sq mi)
- Elevation: 90 m (300 ft)
- Highest elevation: 216 m (709 ft)
- Lowest elevation: 78 m (256 ft)
- Population (2023): 81
  - Density: 13/km^{2} (33/sq mi)
- Time zone: UTC+01:00 (CET)
  - Summer (DST): UTC+02:00 (CEST)
- INSEE/Postal code: 64412 /64190
- ^{1} French Land Register data, which excludes lakes, ponds, glaciers > 1 km^{2} (0.386 sq mi or 247 acres) and river estuaries.

Nabas is a commune in the Pyrénées-Atlantiques department in south-western France.

== Population ==
Historical population
Year	Pop.	±% p.a.
1968	165	—
1975	140	−2.32%
1982	124	−1.72%
1990	115	−0.94%
1999	113	−0.19%
2007	109	−0.45%
2012	124	+2.61%
2017	107	−2.91%
2023	81	−4.53%
Source: INSEE

== See also ==
- Communes of the Pyrénées-Atlantiques department
