= Loubieng =

- Commune
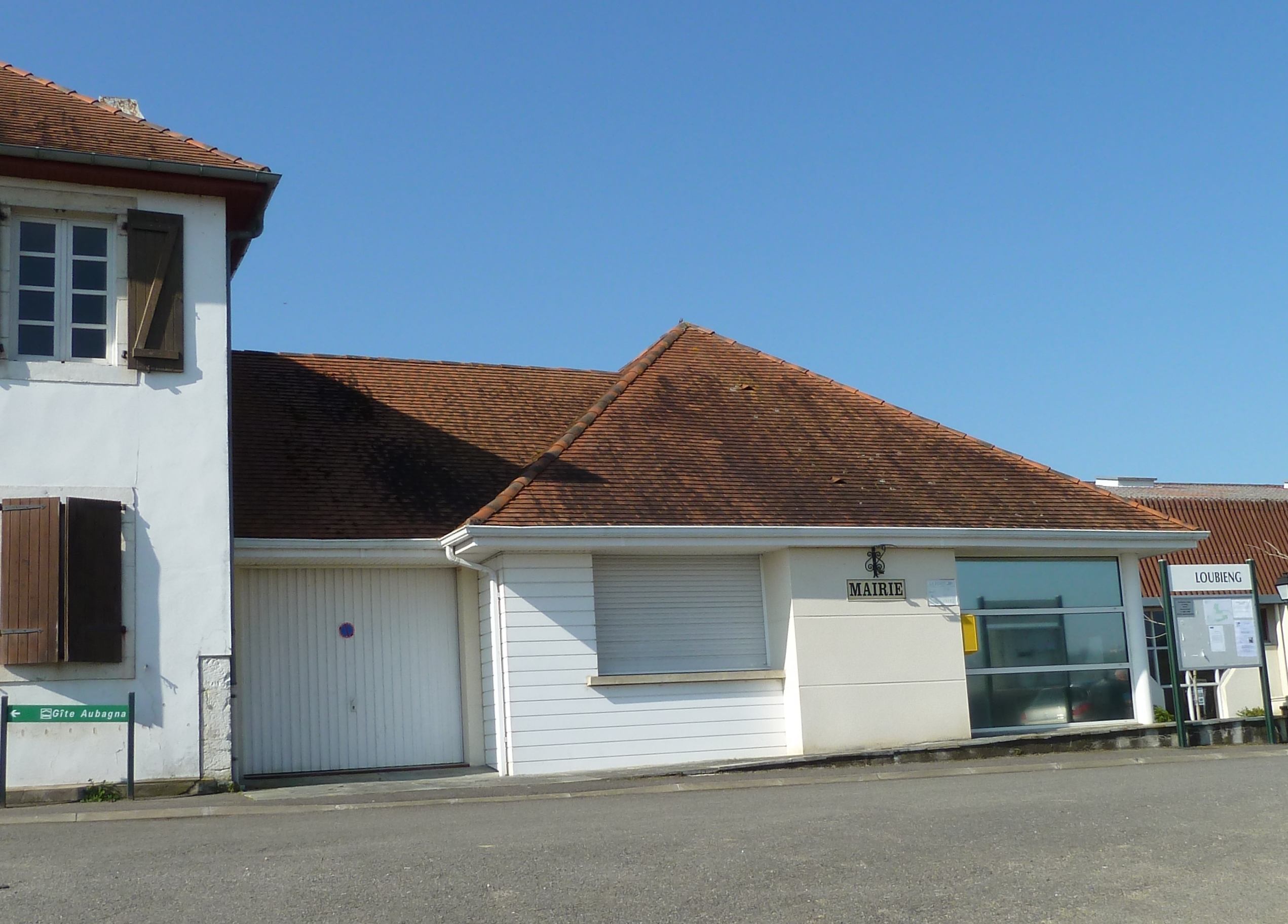
- The town hall of Loubieng
- Location of Loubieng
- Location within France Location within Nouvelle-Aquitaine
- Coordinates: 43°25′57″N 0°45′27″W
- Country: France
- Region: Nouvelle-Aquitaine
- Department: Pyrénées-Atlantiques
- Arrondissement: Pau
- Canton: Le Cœur de Béarn
- Intercommunality: Lacq-Orthez

Government
  - Mayor (2020–2026): Francis Larroque
- Area^{1}: 23.43 km^{2} (9.05 sq mi)
- Elevation: 100 m (330 ft)
- Highest elevation: 224 m (735 ft)
- Lowest elevation: 73 m (240 ft)
- Population (2023): 491
  - Density: 21.0/km^{2} (54.3/sq mi)
- Time zone: UTC+01:00 (CET)
  - Summer (DST): UTC+02:00 (CEST)
- INSEE/Postal code: 64349 /64300
- ^{1} French Land Register data, which excludes lakes, ponds, glaciers > 1 km^{2} (0.386 sq mi or 247 acres) and river estuaries.

Loubieng (French pronunciation: [lubjɛ̃]; Occitan: Lobienh) is a commune in the Pyrénées-Atlantiques department in south-western France.

== See also ==
- Communes of the Pyrénées-Atlantiques department
