= Viellenave-de-Navarrenx =

- Commune
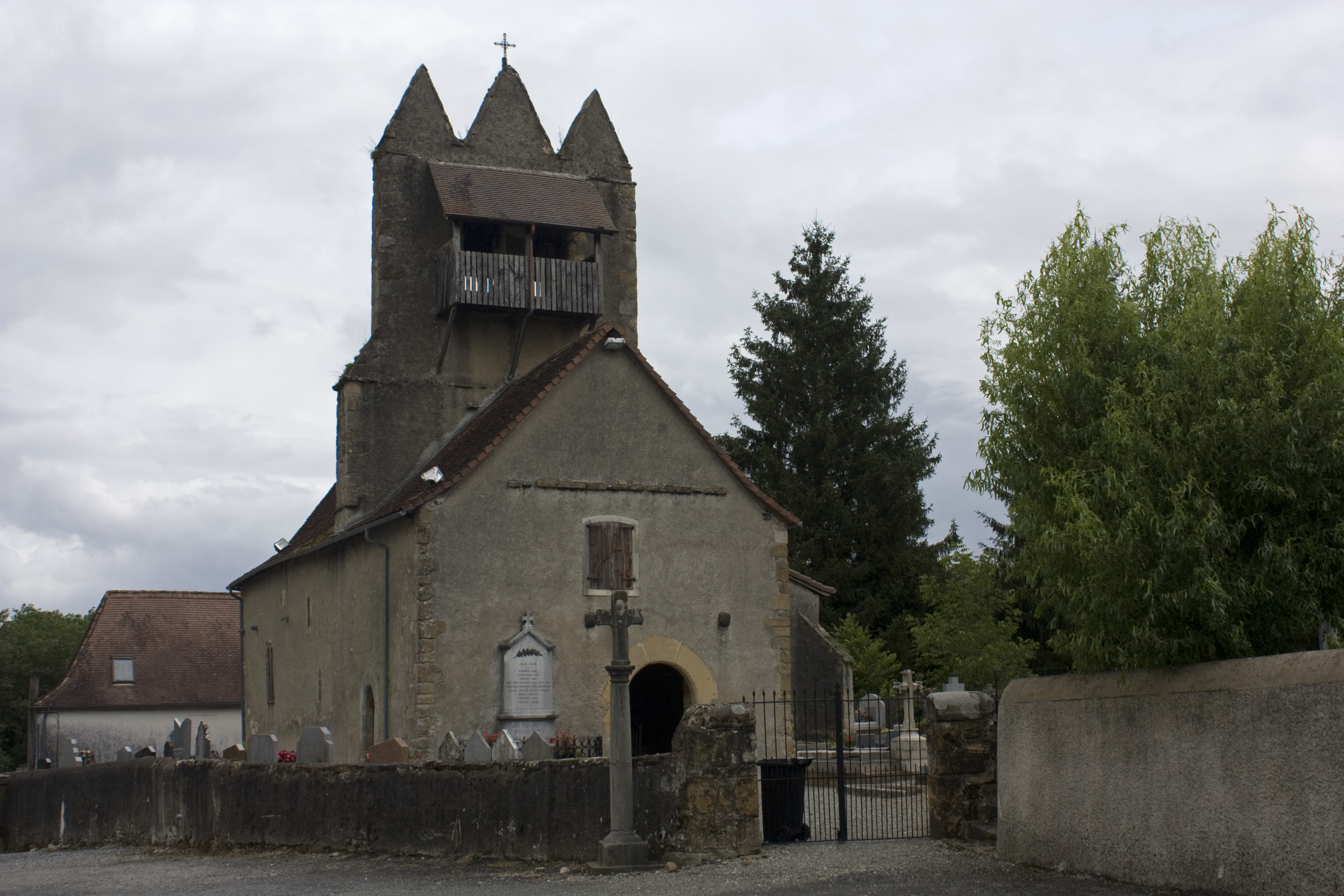
- The church of Viellenave-de-Navarrenx
- Location of Viellenave-de-Navarrenx
- Location within France Location within Nouvelle-Aquitaine
- Coordinates: 43°21′02″N 0°47′31″W
- Country: France
- Region: Nouvelle-Aquitaine
- Department: Pyrénées-Atlantiques
- Arrondissement: Oloron-Sainte-Marie
- Canton: Le Cœur de Béarn
- Intercommunality: Béarn des Gaves

Government
  - Mayor (2020–2026): Jacques Bourguet
- Area^{1}: 5.68 km^{2} (2.19 sq mi)
- Elevation: 125 m (410 ft)
- Highest elevation: 185 m (607 ft)
- Lowest elevation: 98 m (322 ft)
- Population (2023): 158
  - Density: 27.8/km^{2} (72.0/sq mi)
- Time zone: UTC+01:00 (CET)
  - Summer (DST): UTC+02:00 (CEST)
- INSEE/Postal code: 64555 /64190
- ^{1} French Land Register data, which excludes lakes, ponds, glaciers > 1 km^{2} (0.386 sq mi or 247 acres) and river estuaries.

Viellenave-de-Navarrenx (French pronunciation: [vjɛlnav də navaʁɛ̃ks]; Occitan: Vièlanava de Navarrencs) is a commune in the Pyrénées-Atlantiques department in south-western France.

== See also ==
- Communes of the Pyrénées-Atlantiques department
