= Susmiou =

- Commune
- Coat of arms
- Location of Susmiou
- Location within France Location within Nouvelle-Aquitaine
- Coordinates: 43°19′02″N 0°46′30″W
- Country: France
- Region: Nouvelle-Aquitaine
- Department: Pyrénées-Atlantiques
- Arrondissement: Oloron-Sainte-Marie
- Canton: Le Cœur de Béarn
- Intercommunality: Béarn des Gaves

Government
  - Mayor (2020–2026): Bruno Lannes
- Area^{1}: 3.50 km^{2} (1.35 sq mi)
- Elevation: 121 m (397 ft)
- Highest elevation: 181 m (594 ft)
- Lowest elevation: 117 m (384 ft)
- Population (2023): 348
  - Density: 99.4/km^{2} (258/sq mi)
- Time zone: UTC+01:00 (CET)
  - Summer (DST): UTC+02:00 (CEST)
- INSEE/Postal code: 64530 /64190
- ^{1} French Land Register data, which excludes lakes, ponds, glaciers > 1 km^{2} (0.386 sq mi or 247 acres) and river estuaries.

Susmiou (French pronunciation: [sysmju]; Occitan: Susmior) is a commune in the Pyrénées-Atlantiques department in south-western France.

== See also ==
- Communes of the Pyrénées-Atlantiques department
