= Parbayse =

- Commune
- Location of Parbayse
- Location within France Location within Nouvelle-Aquitaine
- Coordinates: 43°19′37″N 0°32′37″W
- Country: France
- Region: Nouvelle-Aquitaine
- Department: Pyrénées-Atlantiques
- Arrondissement: Pau
- Canton: Le Cœur de Béarn
- Intercommunality: Lacq-Orthez

Government
  - Mayor (2020–2026): Nicolas Lapuyade
- Area^{1}: 6.46 km^{2} (2.49 sq mi)
- Elevation: 152 m (499 ft)
- Highest elevation: 273 m (896 ft)
- Lowest elevation: 114 m (374 ft)
- Population (2023): 316
  - Density: 48.9/km^{2} (127/sq mi)
- Time zone: UTC+01:00 (CET)
  - Summer (DST): UTC+02:00 (CEST)
- INSEE/Postal code: 64442 /64360
- ^{1} French Land Register data, which excludes lakes, ponds, glaciers > 1 km^{2} (0.386 sq mi or 247 acres) and river estuaries.

Parbayse (French pronunciation: [paʁbaiz]; Occitan: Parbaïsa) is a commune in the Pyrénées-Atlantiques department in south-western France.

== See also ==
- Communes of the Pyrénées-Atlantiques department
