= Castetner =

- Commune
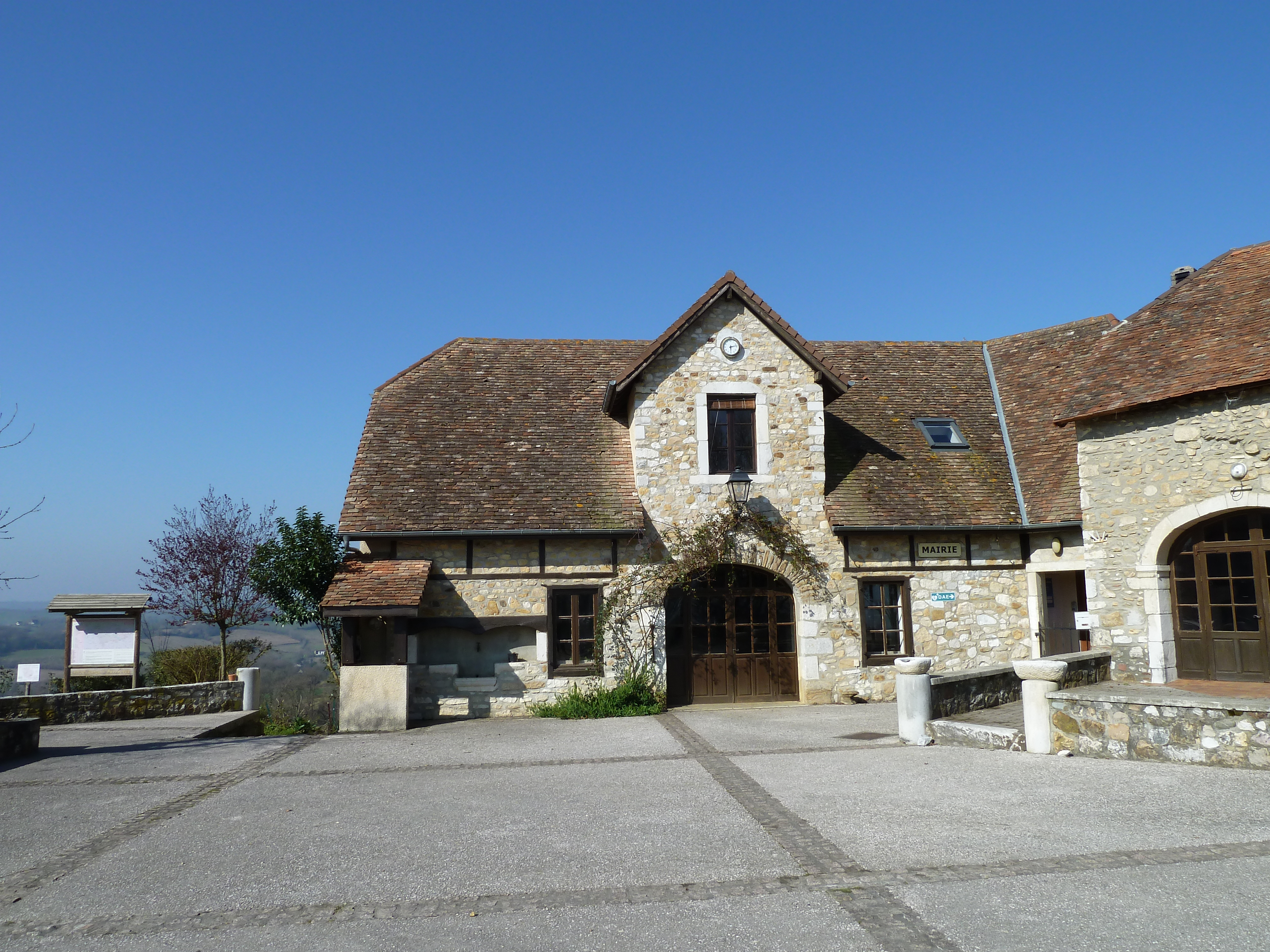
- The town hall of Castetner
- Location of Castetner
- Location within France Location within Nouvelle-Aquitaine
- Coordinates: 43°26′43″N 0°44′44″W
- Country: France
- Region: Nouvelle-Aquitaine
- Department: Pyrénées-Atlantiques
- Arrondissement: Pau
- Canton: Le Cœur de Béarn
- Intercommunality: Lacq-Orthez

Government
  - Mayor (2020–2026): Nadia Grammontin
- Area^{1}: 6.56 km^{2} (2.53 sq mi)
- Elevation: 74 m (243 ft)
- Highest elevation: 215 m (705 ft)
- Lowest elevation: 69 m (226 ft)
- Population (2023): 140
  - Density: 21/km^{2} (55/sq mi)
- Time zone: UTC+01:00 (CET)
  - Summer (DST): UTC+02:00 (CEST)
- INSEE/Postal code: 64179 /64300
- ^{1} French Land Register data, which excludes lakes, ponds, glaciers > 1 km^{2} (0.386 sq mi or 247 acres) and river estuaries.

Castetner is a commune in the Pyrénées-Atlantiques department in southwestern France.

== See also ==
- Communes of the Pyrénées-Atlantiques department
