= Maslacq =

- Commune
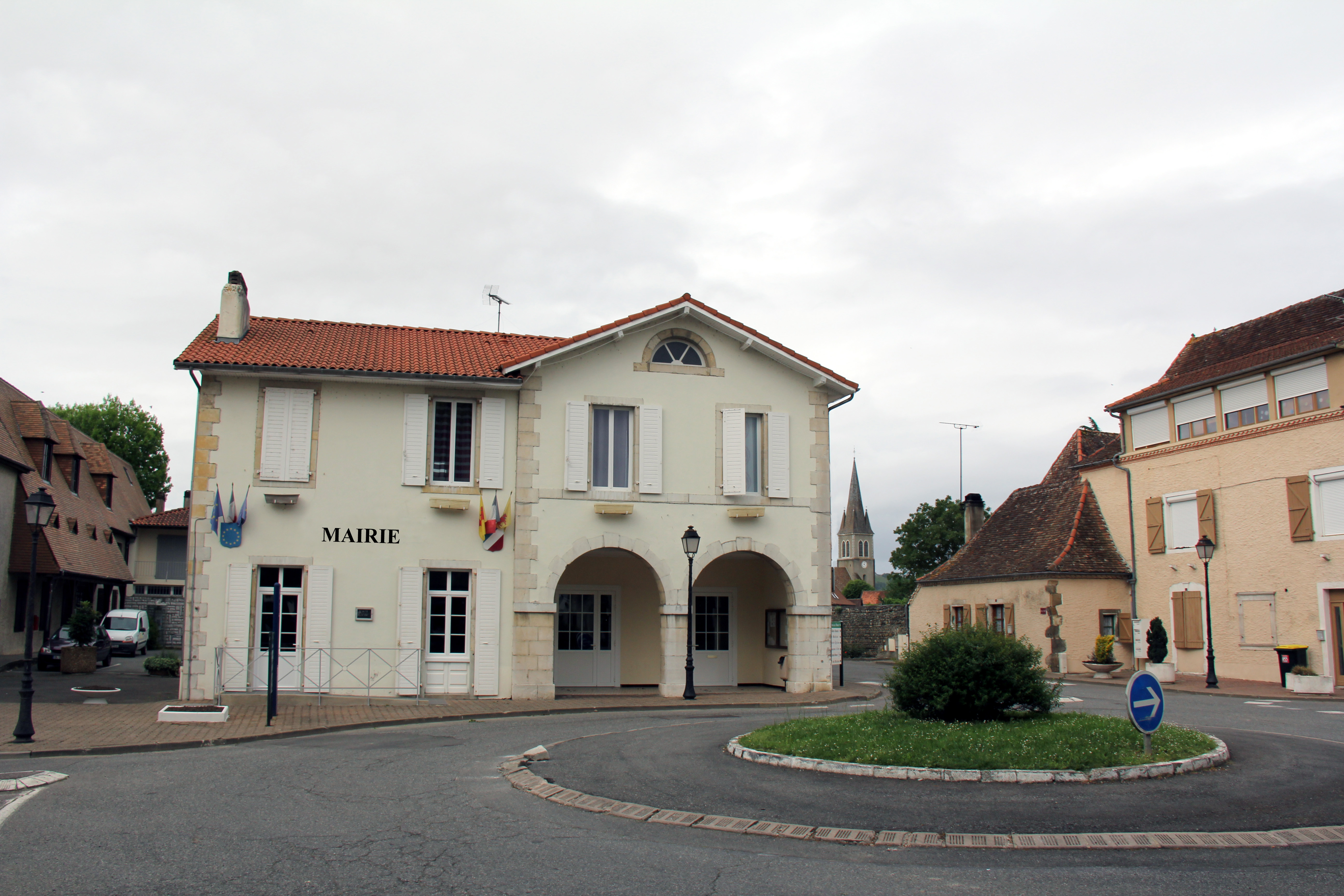
- The town hall of Maslacq

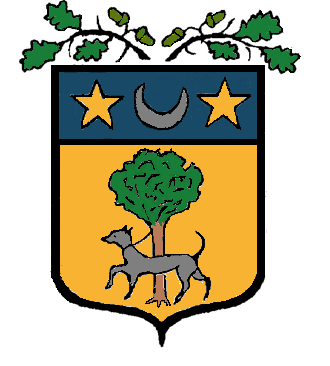
- Coat of arms
- Location of Maslacq
- Location within France Location within Nouvelle-Aquitaine
- Coordinates: 43°26′27″N 0°41′40″W
- Country: France
- Region: Nouvelle-Aquitaine
- Department: Pyrénées-Atlantiques
- Arrondissement: Pau
- Canton: Le Cœur de Béarn
- Intercommunality: Lacq-Orthez

Government
  - Mayor (2020–2026): Jean Naulé
- Area^{1}: 13.33 km^{2} (5.15 sq mi)
- Elevation: 76 m (249 ft)
- Highest elevation: 197 m (646 ft)
- Lowest elevation: 67 m (220 ft)
- Population (2023): 891
  - Density: 66.8/km^{2} (173/sq mi)
- Time zone: UTC+01:00 (CET)
  - Summer (DST): UTC+02:00 (CEST)
- INSEE/Postal code: 64367 /64300
- ^{1} French Land Register data, which excludes lakes, ponds, glaciers > 1 km^{2} (0.386 sq mi or 247 acres) and river estuaries.

Maslacq (French pronunciation: [maslak]) is a commune in the Pyrénées-Atlantiques department in south-western France.

== See also ==
- Communes of the Pyrénées-Atlantiques department
