= Os-Marsillon =

- Commune
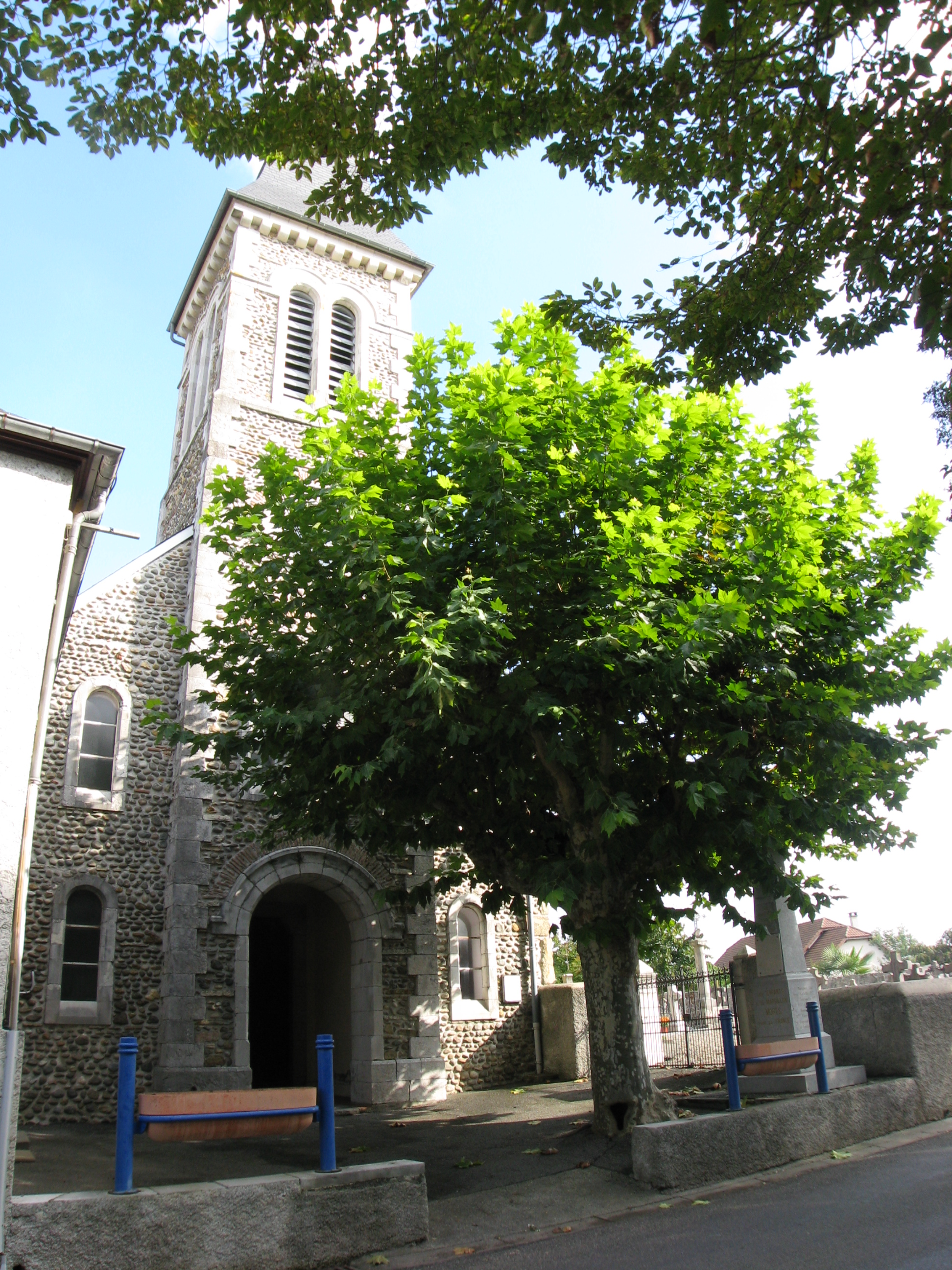
- The church of Os-Marsillon
- Location of Os-Marsillon
- Location within France Location within Nouvelle-Aquitaine
- Coordinates: 43°23′23″N 0°36′52″W
- Country: France
- Region: Nouvelle-Aquitaine
- Department: Pyrénées-Atlantiques
- Arrondissement: Pau
- Canton: Le Cœur de Béarn
- Intercommunality: Lacq-Orthez

Government
  - Mayor (2020–2026): Jérôme Toulouse
- Area^{1}: 5.45 km^{2} (2.10 sq mi)
- Elevation: 101 m (331 ft)
- Highest elevation: 151 m (495 ft)
- Lowest elevation: 92 m (302 ft)
- Population (2023): 547
  - Density: 100/km^{2} (260/sq mi)
- Time zone: UTC+01:00 (CET)
  - Summer (DST): UTC+02:00 (CEST)
- INSEE/Postal code: 64431 /64150
- ^{1} French Land Register data, which excludes lakes, ponds, glaciers > 1 km^{2} (0.386 sq mi or 247 acres) and river estuaries.

Os-Marsillon (French pronunciation: [ɔs maʁsijɔ̃]; Occitan: Òs e Marcelhon) is a commune in the Pyrénées-Atlantiques department in south-western France.

== See also ==
- Communes of the Pyrénées-Atlantiques department
