= Bésingrand =

- Commune
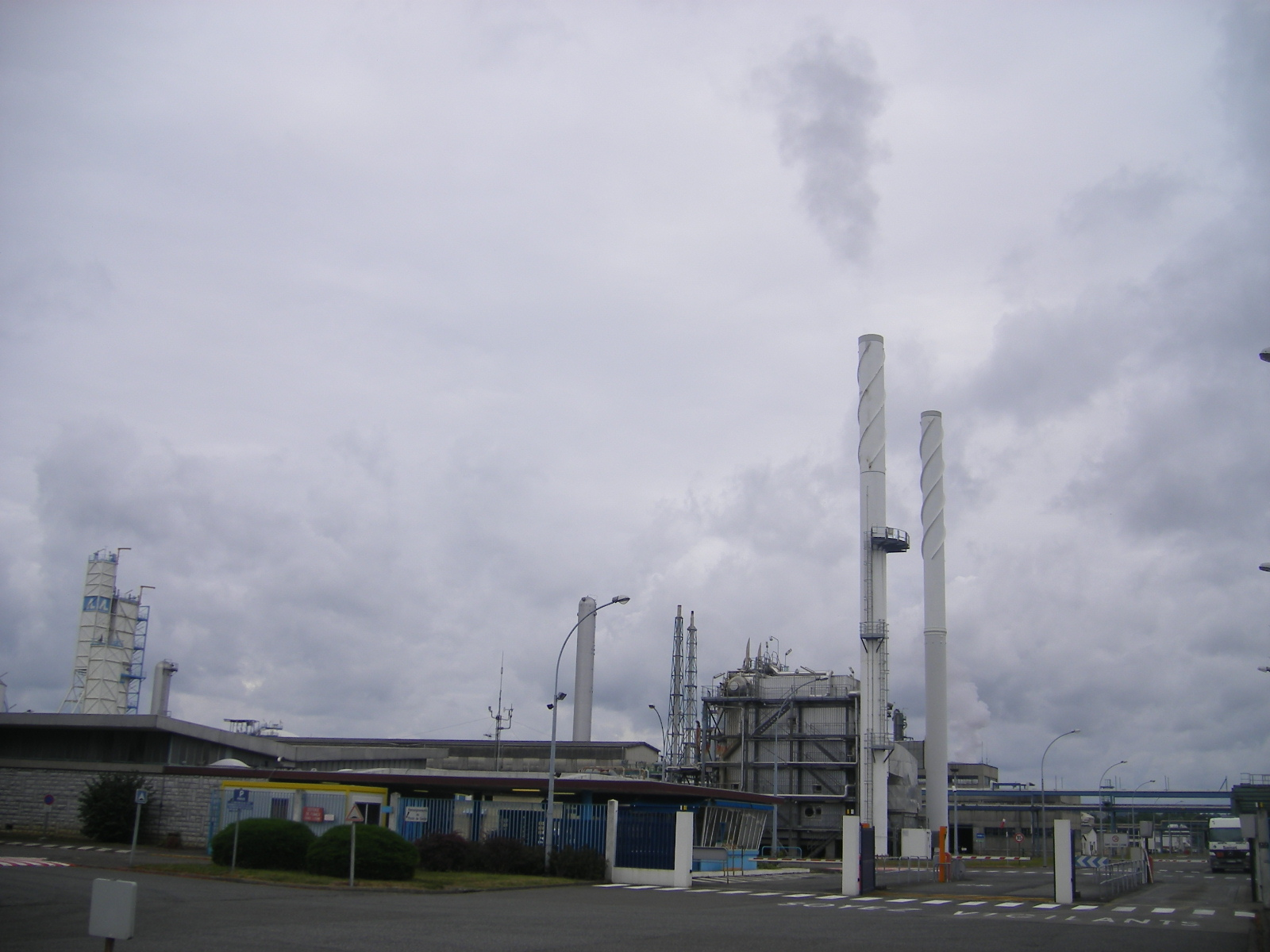
- The oil refinery in Bésingrand
- Location of Bésingrand
- Location within France Location within Nouvelle-Aquitaine
- Coordinates: 43°22′22″N 0°34′01″W
- Country: France
- Region: Nouvelle-Aquitaine
- Department: Pyrénées-Atlantiques
- Arrondissement: Pau
- Canton: Le Cœur de Béarn

Government
  - Mayor (2020–2026): Michel Laurio
- Area^{1}: 2.29 km^{2} (0.88 sq mi)
- Elevation: 119 m (390 ft)
- Highest elevation: 118 m (387 ft)
- Lowest elevation: 105 m (344 ft)
- Population (2023): 146
  - Density: 63.8/km^{2} (165/sq mi)
- Time zone: UTC+01:00 (CET)
  - Summer (DST): UTC+02:00 (CEST)
- INSEE/Postal code: 64117 /64150
- ^{1} French Land Register data, which excludes lakes, ponds, glaciers > 1 km^{2} (0.386 sq mi or 247 acres) and river estuaries.

Bésingrand (French pronunciation: [bezɛ̃ɡʁɑ̃]; Occitan: Vesingran) is a commune of the Pyrénées-Atlantiques department in southwestern France.

== See also ==
- Communes of the Pyrénées-Atlantiques department
