= Biron, Pyrénées-Atlantiques =

Biron
- Commune
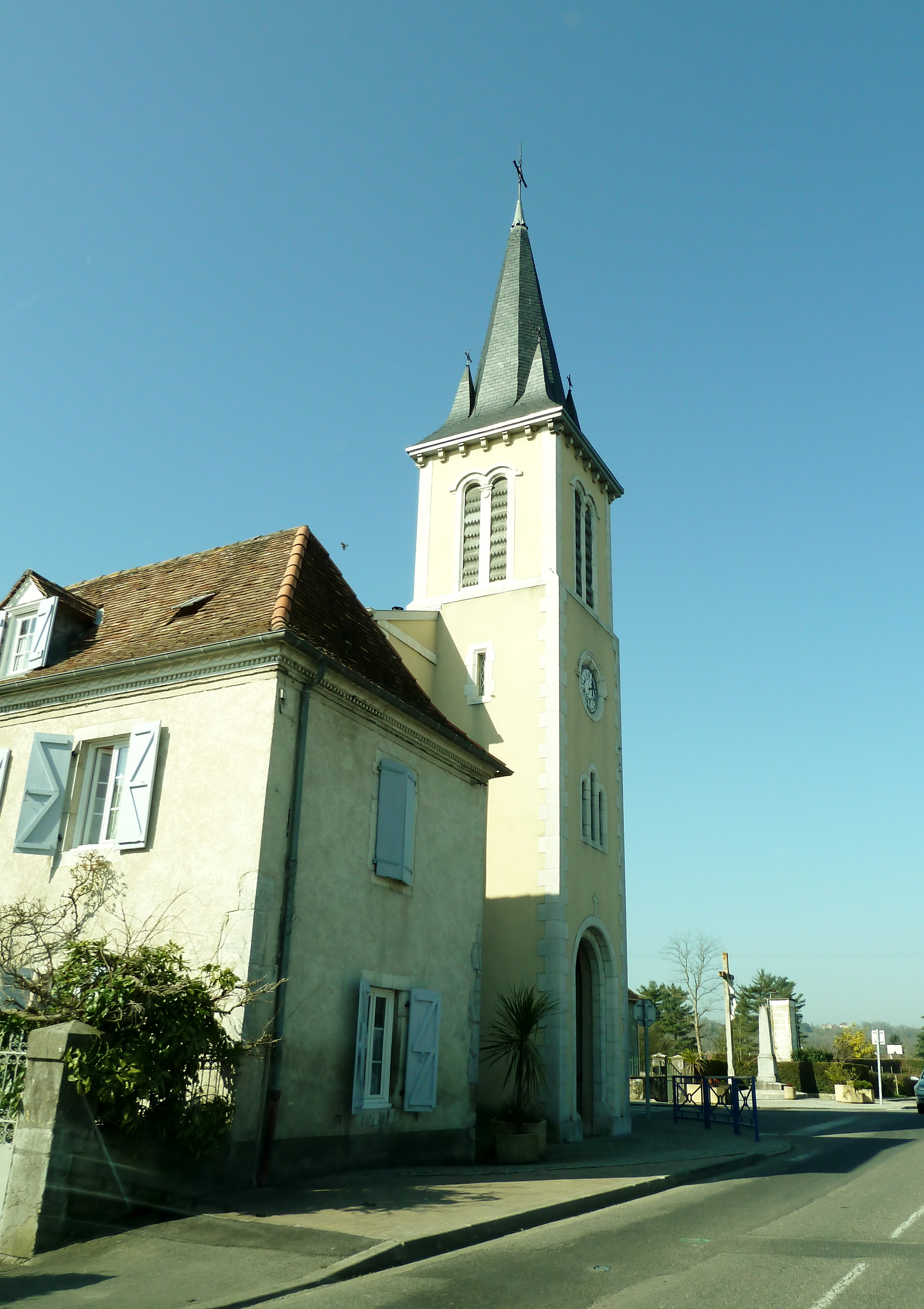
- The church of Biron
- Location of Biron
- Location within France Location within Nouvelle-Aquitaine
- Coordinates: 43°27′47″N 0°44′02″W
- Country: France
- Region: Nouvelle-Aquitaine
- Department: Pyrénées-Atlantiques
- Arrondissement: Pau
- Canton: Le Cœur de Béarn
- Intercommunality: Lacq-Orthez

Government
  - Mayor (2020–2026): Benoît Pourtau-Mondoutey
- Area^{1}: 4.00 km^{2} (1.54 sq mi)
- Elevation: 76 m (249 ft)
- Highest elevation: 171 m (561 ft)
- Lowest elevation: 57 m (187 ft)
- Population (2023): 595
  - Density: 149/km^{2} (385/sq mi)
- Time zone: UTC+01:00 (CET)
  - Summer (DST): UTC+02:00 (CEST)
- INSEE/Postal code: 64131 /64300
- ^{1} French Land Register data, which excludes lakes, ponds, glaciers > 1 km^{2} (0.386 sq mi or 247 acres) and river estuaries.

Biron (French pronunciation: [biʁɔ̃]; Occitan: Viron) is a commune in the Pyrénées-Atlantiques department in southwestern France.

== Demography ==
Historical population
Year	Pop.	±% p.a.
1968	405	—
1975	437	+1.09%
1982	486	+1.53%
1990	529	+1.07%
1999	505	−0.51%
2007	556	+1.21%
2012	610	+1.87%
2017	679	+2.17%
2023	595	−2.18%
Source: INSEE

== See also ==
- Communes of the Pyrénées-Atlantiques department
