= Noguères =

- Commune
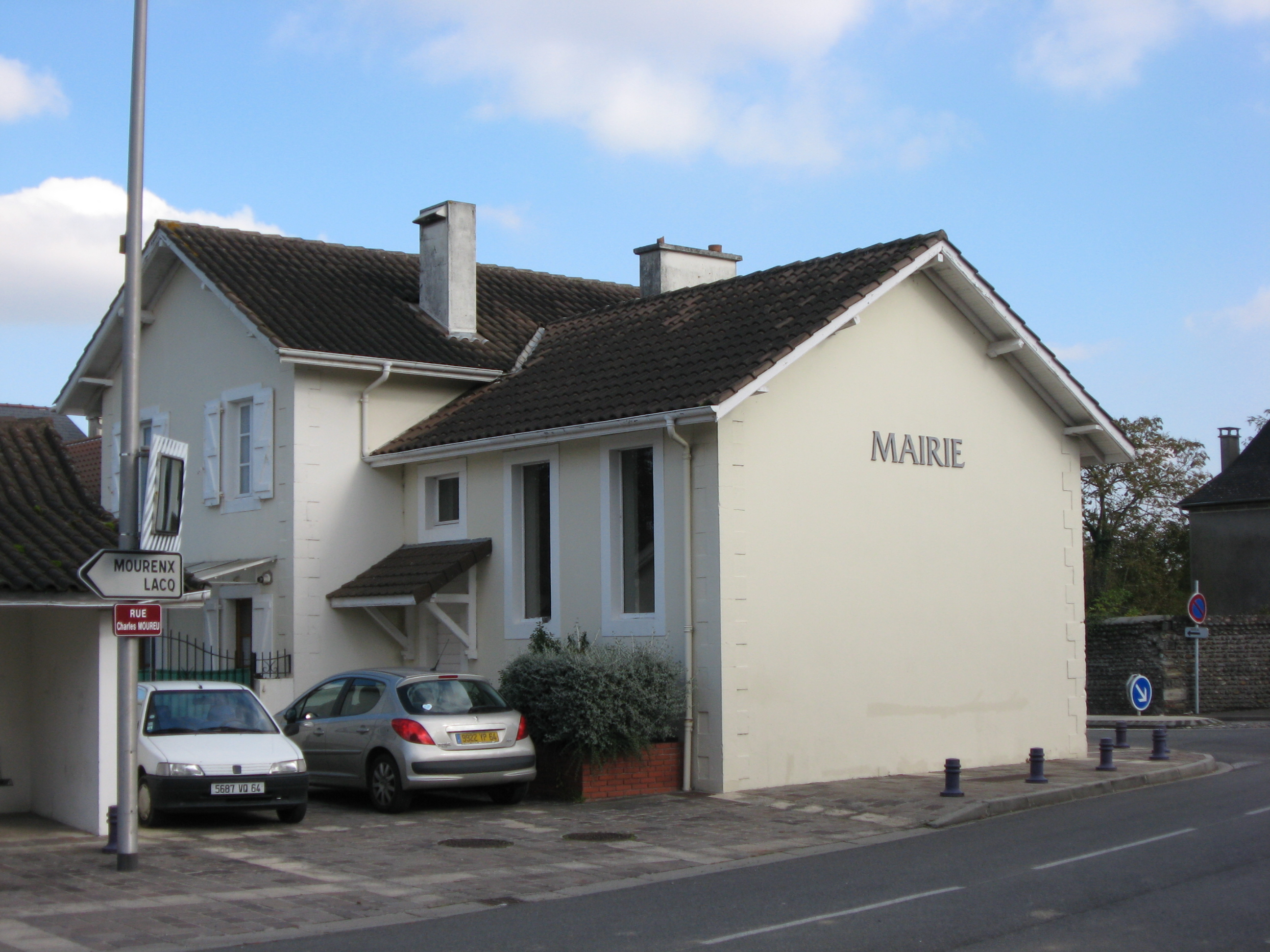
- The town hall of Noguères
- Location of Noguères
- Location within France Location within Nouvelle-Aquitaine
- Coordinates: 43°22′20″N 0°35′39″W
- Country: France
- Region: Nouvelle-Aquitaine
- Department: Pyrénées-Atlantiques
- Arrondissement: Pau
- Canton: Le Cœur de Béarn
- Intercommunality: Lacq-Orthez

Government
  - Mayor (2020–2026): Firmin Lara
- Area^{1}: 1.95 km^{2} (0.75 sq mi)
- Elevation: 110 m (360 ft)
- Highest elevation: 152 m (499 ft)
- Lowest elevation: 104 m (341 ft)
- Population (2023): 121
  - Density: 62.1/km^{2} (161/sq mi)
- Time zone: UTC+01:00 (CET)
  - Summer (DST): UTC+02:00 (CEST)
- INSEE/Postal code: 64418 /64150
- ^{1} French Land Register data, which excludes lakes, ponds, glaciers > 1 km^{2} (0.386 sq mi or 247 acres) and river estuaries.

Noguères (French pronunciation: [nɔɡɛʁ]; Occitan: Noguèras) is a commune in the Pyrénées-Atlantiques department in south-western France.

== See also ==
- Communes of the Pyrénées-Atlantiques department
