= Angaïs =

- Commune
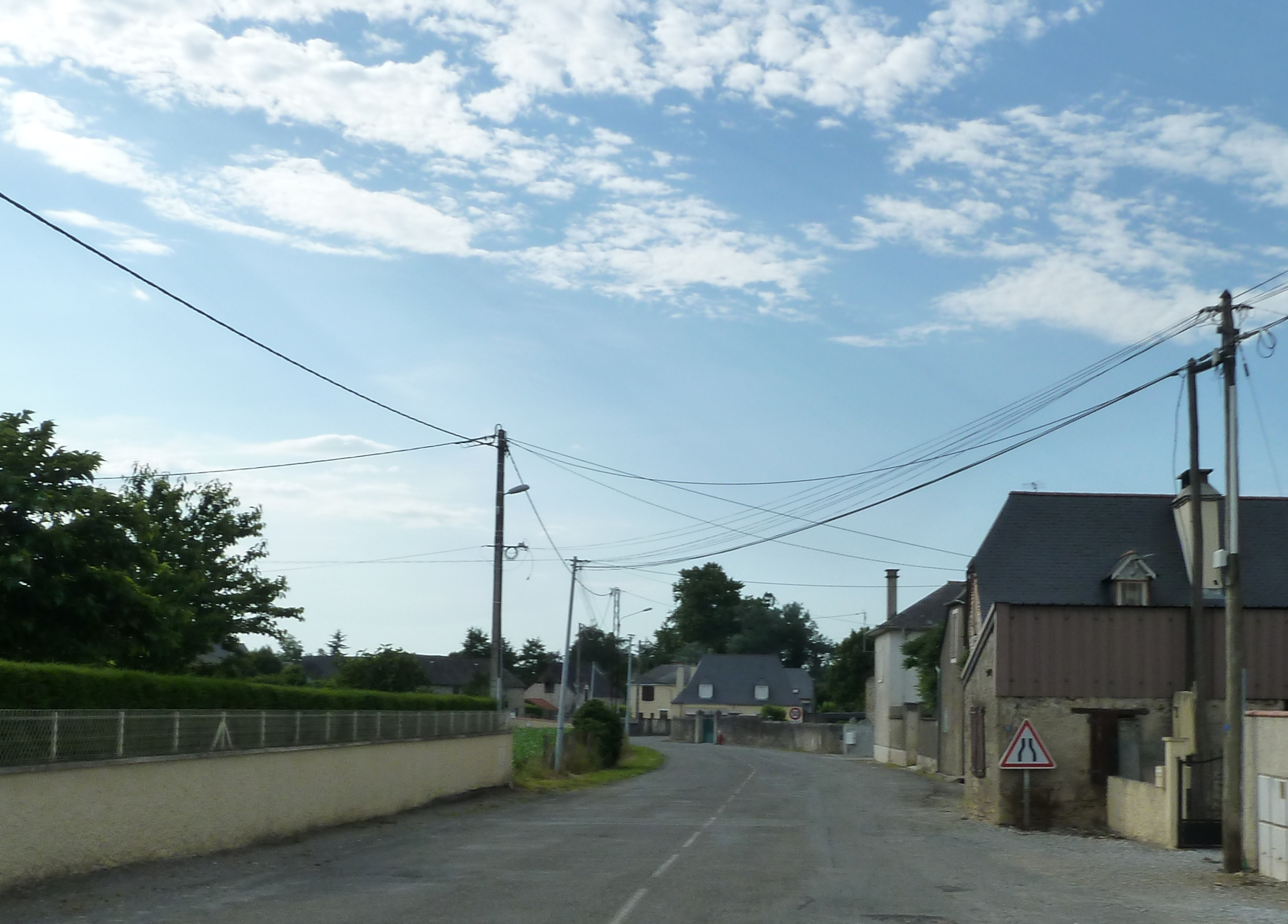
- A general view of Angaïs
- Location of Angaïs
- Location within France Location within Nouvelle-Aquitaine
- Coordinates: 43°14′19″N 0°15′05″W
- Country: France
- Region: Nouvelle-Aquitaine
- Department: Pyrénées-Atlantiques
- Arrondissement: Pau
- Canton: Vallées de l'Ousse et du Lagoin
- Intercommunality: Pays de Nay

Government
  - Mayor (2020–2026): Hubert Vignau
- Area^{1}: 5.94 km^{2} (2.29 sq mi)
- Elevation: 235 m (771 ft)
- Highest elevation: 412 m (1,352 ft)
- Lowest elevation: 214 m (702 ft)
- Population (2023): 885
  - Density: 149/km^{2} (386/sq mi)
- Time zone: UTC+01:00 (CET)
  - Summer (DST): UTC+02:00 (CEST)
- INSEE/Postal code: 64023 /64510
- ^{1} French Land Register data, which excludes lakes, ponds, glaciers > 1 km^{2} (0.386 sq mi or 247 acres) and river estuaries.

Angaïs (French pronunciation: [ɑ̃ɡa.is]; Occitan: Angais, pronounced [aŋˈɡajs]) is a commune in the Pyrénées-Atlantiques department in the Nouvelle-Aquitaine region of south-western France.

== Geography ==
Angaïs is located in the urban area of Pau some 12 km south-east of Pau and 6 km south of Ousse. Access to the commune is by the D38 road from Ousse in the north-west passing through the town and continuing south to Baudreix. The D215 comes from near Assat in the west passing through the town and continuing south-east to Beuste. The D938 passes through the south-western corner of the commune and the D839 from Boeil-Bezing forms the southern border of the commune. The north-east of the commune is heavily forested for about 25% of the total land area with the rest of the commune outside the town area farmland.

Bus route 835 of the Interurban Network of Pyrenees Atlantiques from Bénéjacq to Pau services the commune.

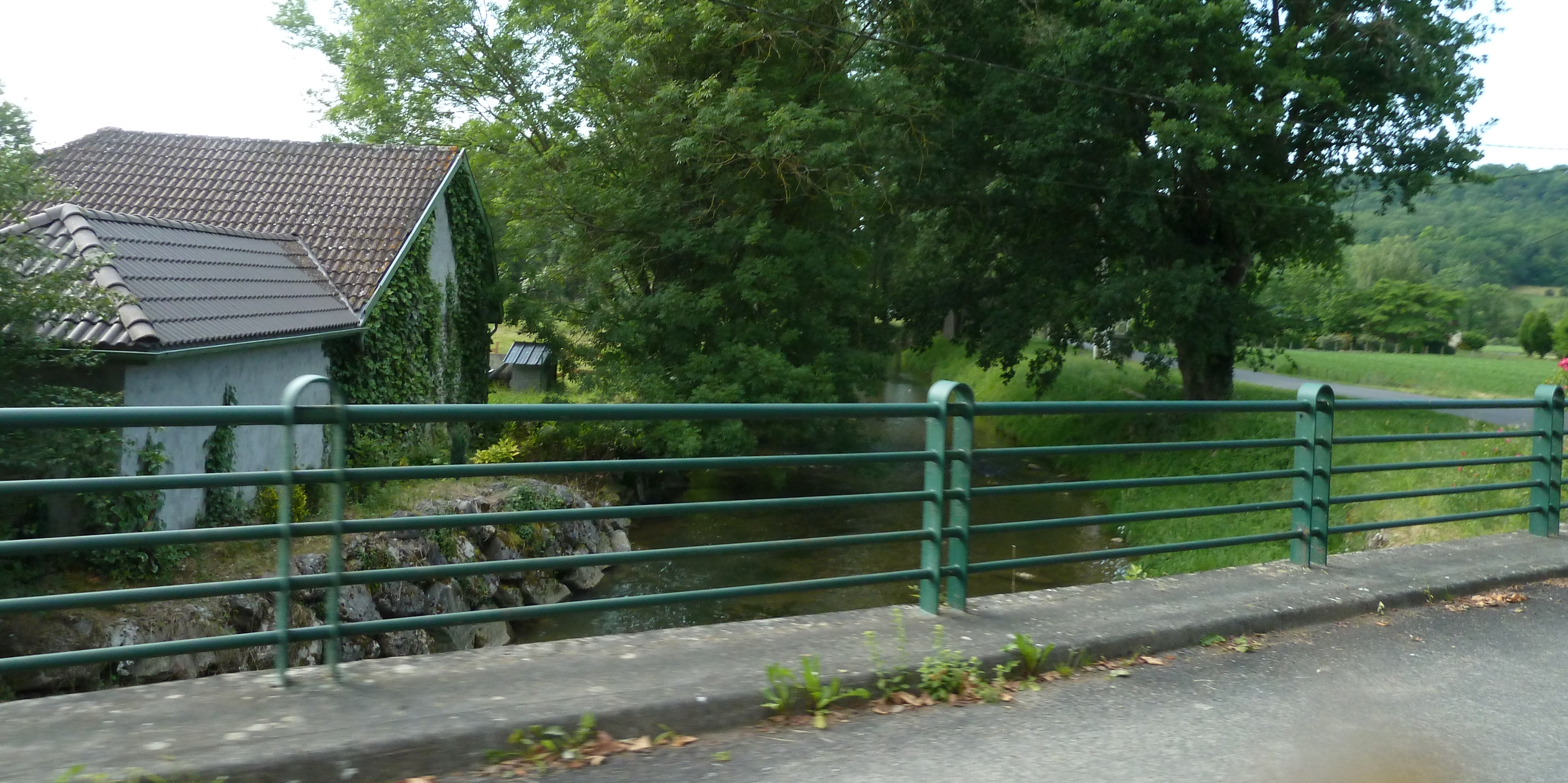
The Lagoin river at Angaïs

The Lagoin river flows through the centre of the commune from south-east to north-west continuing to join the Gave de Pau near Pau.

=== Places and Hamlets ===
- Abérat
- Las Baches
- Bonnecaze
- Boué Bignes
- Las Clabades
- Coulat
- Grange de Cournac
- Lafont
- Grange Laraignou
- Le Moulin de Capbat
- Papus
- Pascal
- La Roque
- Turounet

== Toponymy ==
The commune name in béarnais is Angais.

Brigitte Jobbe-Duval indicated that a possible origin of the name is the patronym Gaiz. She also mentioned that previously the people were nicknamed éleveurs de mules (Mule farmers). The breeding of these animals had been one of the most productive industries of the Nay plain and particularly of the commune of Angaïs.

The following table details the origins of the commune name and other names in the commune.

Name	Spelling	Date	Source	Page	Origin	Description
Angaïs	Angays	1343	Raymond	6	Homages	Village
	Anguays	1540	Raymond	6	Reformation	
	Angais	1750	Cassini			
	Angais	1793	Ldh/EHESS/Cassini		Bulletin des Lois	
Abérat	Averat	1457	Raymond	2	Assat	Fief, vassal of the Viscounts of Béarn
Batbielle	Baigbiella	13th century	Raymond	24	Fors de Béarn	Lands and Woods across the communes of Angaïs, Beuste, Boeil, Bénéjacq, Bordères, Lagos, and Mirepeix under the jurisdiction of the Jurors of Beuste. It was an Archdeaconry in the Diocese of Lescar and included control over the Canton of Nay
	Archidiagonat de Batbilhe	1385	Raymond	24	Census	
	Batbielhe	1396	Raymond	24	Navarrenx	
	l'archidiagonat de Begbielle	1400	Raymond	24	Navarrenx	
	Le conbent de Bagbielhe	1538	Raymond	24	Reformation	
	Les Abbatbielles	1675	Raymond	24	Reformation	
Navailles	Navailles	1863	Raymond	121		Farm

Sources:

- Raymond: Topographic Dictionary of the Department of Basses-Pyrenees, 1863, on the page numbers indicated in the table. (in French)
- Cassini: Cassini Map from 1750
- Ldh/EHESS/Cassini: Des villages de Cassini aux communes d'aujourd'hui: Commune data sheet Angaïs, EHESS (in French).

Origins:

- Homages: Homages of Béarn
- Reformation: Reformation of Béarn
- Assat:
- Fors de Béarn
- Census: Census of Béarn
- Navarrenx: Notaries of Navarrenx

== History ==
Paul Raymond noted on page 6 of his 1863 dictionary that the commune once had a Lay Abbey, vassal of the Viscounts of Béarn. In 1385 there were 4 fires in the commune and it depended on the bailiwick of Pau.

On 2 February 1617 Louis de Colom, lay abbot of Angaïs and a trustee of Béarn, made an important speech which united the Catholics and Protestants of Béarn to resist the king's wishes, and to oppose the execution of any act that may lead to political annexation of Béarn to France. Later in the same year the First Huguenot Rebellion occurred.

The Barony of Angaïs was created in 1656 by Louis XIV and consisted of Beuste, Ousse, and Sendets.

Isaac de Navailles appears to have been the first Baron, and Henri de Navailles-Labatut was Baron of Angaïs in the mid-19th century.

The Uzerte of Angaïs refers to a local phenomenon of plague that was documented in 1789. The inhabitants of Angaïs stated that almost every year the plague was transported by very clear water - which rose above the village on the plain on the upper side of the wooded area - in April, May, and June. It caused fatal diseases in humans and animals. The poisoned water also harmed plants, such as maize, wheat, flax, grass, and vegetables in gardens.

== Administration ==
List of Successive Mayors

From	To	Name
1995	2001	Pierre Prat
2001	2020	Bernard Arrabie
2020	2026	Hubert Vignau

=== Inter-communality ===
The commune is part of six inter-communal structures:

- the Communauté de communes du Pays de Nay;
- the AEP association of the Plain of Nay;
- the Sanitation association of Gave and Lagoin;
- the association for defence against flooding in the Lagoin basin;
- the Energy association of Pyrénées-Atlantiques;
- the inter-communal association for the construction of the CES of Nay;

== Demography ==
The inhabitants of the commune are known as Angaïsais or Angaïsaises in French.

Historical population

Year	Pop.	±% p.a.
1793	568	—
1821	661	+0.54%
1846	851	+1.02%
1872	802	−0.23%
1901	697	−0.48%
1926	561	−0.86%
1946	467	−0.91%
1962	491	+0.31%
1968	535	+1.44%

Year	Pop.	±% p.a.
1975	534	−0.03%
1982	623	+2.23%
1990	760	+2.52%
1999	739	−0.31%
2007	803	+1.04%
2012	852	+1.19%
2017	889	+0.85%
2023	885	−0.08%

Source: EHESS and INSEE

== Economy ==
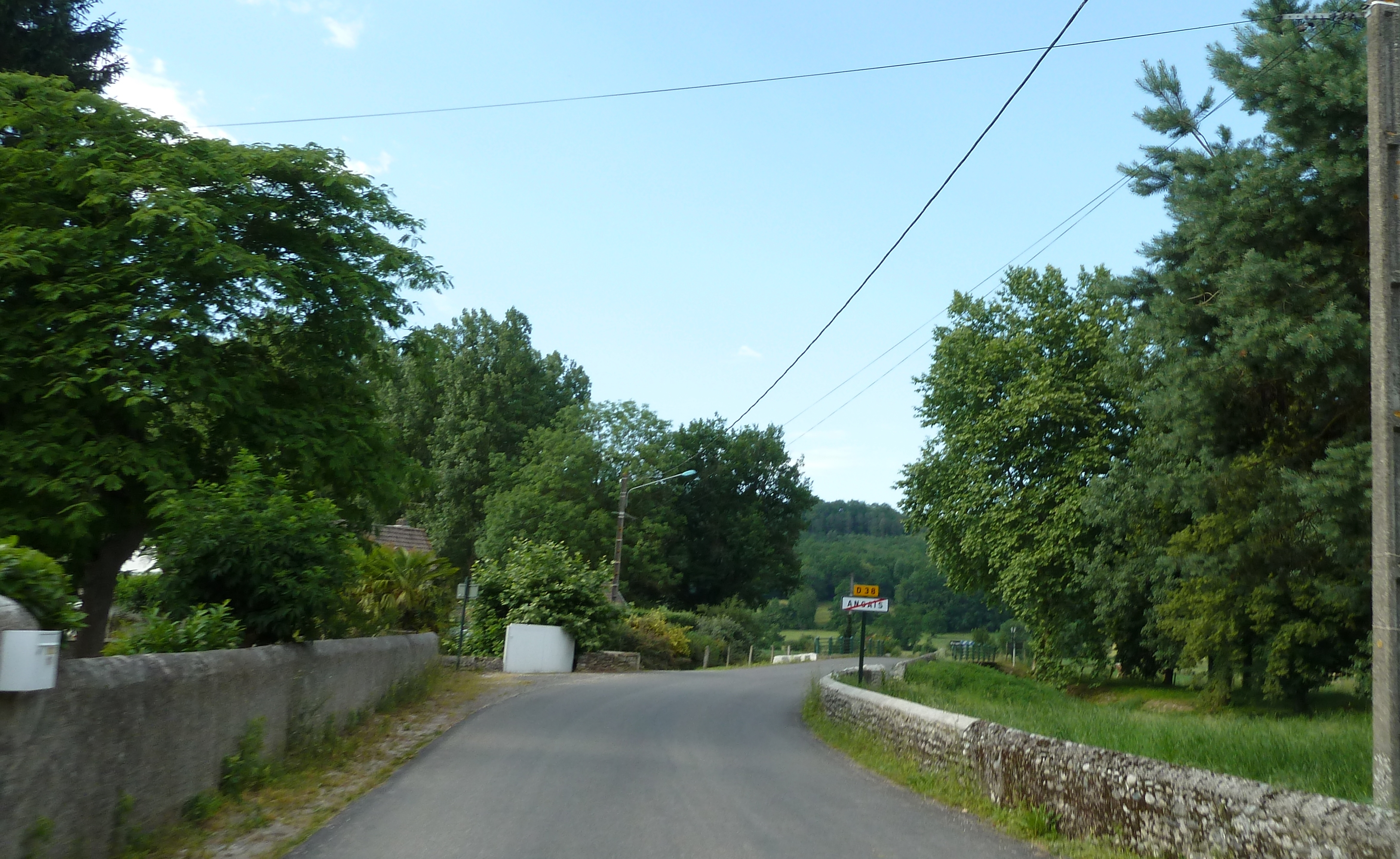
Exit from Angaïs

The commune is part of the Appellation d'origine contrôlée (AOC) zone of Ossau-Iraty.

== Culture and heritage ==
=== Civil heritage ===
- The Château of Angaïs (1908) is registered as an historical monument.

=== Religious heritage ===
- The Parish Church of Notre-Dame (1845) is registered as an historical monument. Inside the church the Altar and Retable (17th century) in the south side chapel are registered as historical objects.

=== Environmental heritage ===
The Chemin Henri-IV borders the commune in the north-east. It is a walking trail that connects the Château of Franqueville to Bizanos near Pau at the Lake of Lourdes (Hautes-Pyrénées). It alternates forest trails with dirt roads and offers walkers panoramic views of the Pyrenees, the foothills, and the plains.

About 35 kilometres long, the route can be divided up between the various roads that it crosses. It is possible to go on foot, on horseback, or by bicycle but motor vehicles are forbidden.

=== Education ===
The commune has a primary school.

== See also ==
- Communes of the Pyrénées-Atlantiques department
