= Barzun, Pyrénées-Atlantiques =

Barzun
- Commune
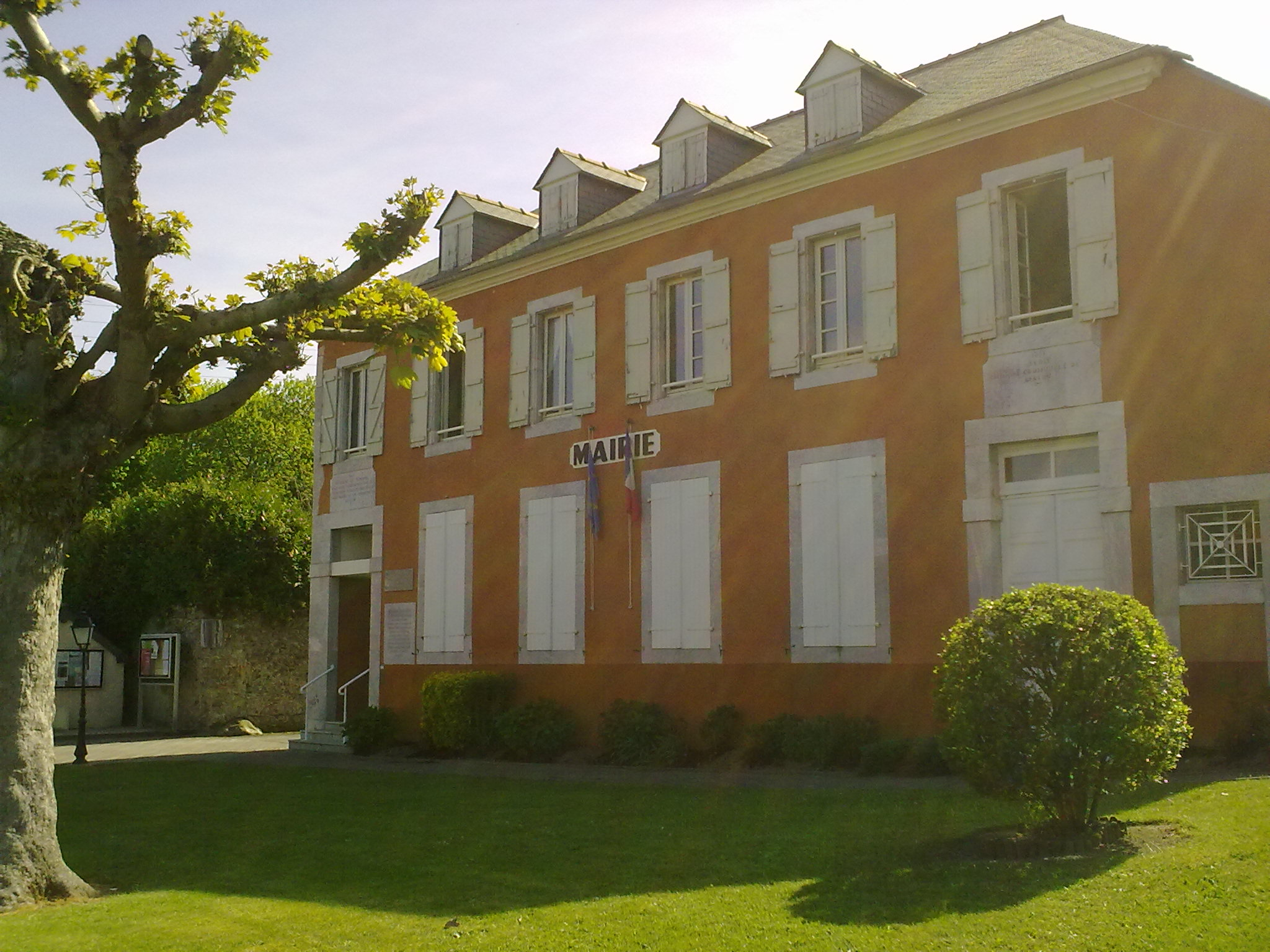
- The Town hall
- Location of Barzun
- Location within France Location within Nouvelle-Aquitaine
- Coordinates: 43°12′53″N 0°07′41″W
- Country: France
- Region: Nouvelle-Aquitaine
- Department: Pyrénées-Atlantiques
- Arrondissement: Pau
- Canton: Vallées de l'Ousse et du Lagoin

Government
  - Mayor (2020–2026): René Millet
- Area^{1}: 8.19 km^{2} (3.16 sq mi)
- Elevation: 388 m (1,273 ft)
- Highest elevation: 435 m (1,427 ft)
- Lowest elevation: 323 m (1,060 ft)
- Population (2023): 626
  - Density: 76.4/km^{2} (198/sq mi)
- Time zone: UTC+01:00 (CET)
  - Summer (DST): UTC+02:00 (CEST)
- INSEE/Postal code: 64097 /64530
- ^{1} French Land Register data, which excludes lakes, ponds, glaciers > 1 km^{2} (0.386 sq mi or 247 acres) and river estuaries.

Barzun (French pronunciation: [baʁzœ̃]) is a commune in the Pyrénées-Atlantiques department in the Nouvelle-Aquitaine region of south-western France.

== Geography ==
Barzun is located some 20 km east by south-east of Pau and 15 km north-west of Lourdes. Access to the commune is by the D940 road from Espoey in the north-west which passes through the commune just west of the village and continues south to Lamarque-Pontacq. The D640 comes from Livron in the north and passes through the village continuing to Pontacq in the south. The D642 and the D418 connect the D940 to the village. The D42 passes through the eastern tip of the commune. The commune is all farmland except for a belt of forest east of and parallel to the Ruisseau de l'Ousse.

The Ruisseau de l'Ousse flows through the commune and the village from south-east to north and continues north to join the Gave de Pau at Pau. The Oussère river flows parallel to the Ruisseau de l'Ousse west of the village until they join north of the commune. The Sausse forms the western border of the commune as it flows north to join the Ourrou north-west of the commune. The Hoursoumou and the Ruisseau du Goua de Michou flow parallel to each other north through the east of the commune continuing to join the Gabas Lake at Luquet.

=== Places and hamlets ===
- Arribarrouy
- Balagué
- Batailles
- Bédat
- Bédat et Sarrailh
- Boyrie
- Capblan
- Cazaillet
- Cazala (barn)
- Las Cordes
- La Débèze
- Goua (bridge)
- Grada (barn)
- Hourcaspy
- Hourmiau
- Hourq Mayou et Espélague
- Labourdette
- Lanas
- Lapalangue (bridge)
- Larbiouze (barn)
- Larroutis
- Layrisse (barn)
- Lupié Thén
- Moulat
- Nargasse (barn)
- Pardimène (mill)
- Pène
- Pistoulet (barn)
- Le Poublan
- Ramounet
- Técous et Labie
- Tisnères (barn)

== Toponymy ==
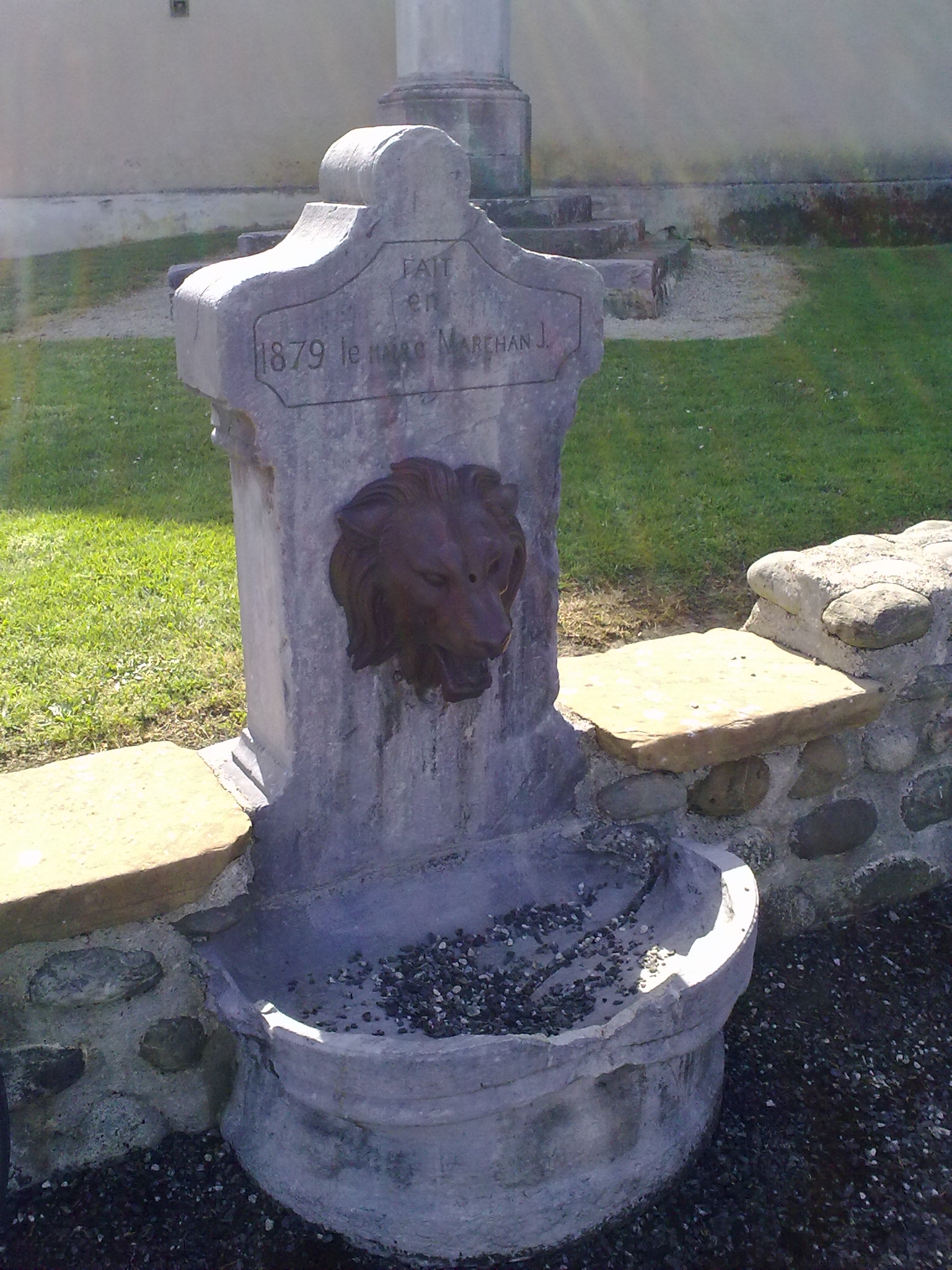
A fountain at the entrance to Barzun dated 1879

Michel Grosclaude said that the name probably comes from the Latin anthroponym Barisius with the suffix -unum.

The following table details the origins of the commune name and other names in the commune.

Name	Spelling	Date	Source	Page	Origin	Description
Barzun	Barzunum	1286	Raymond	22	Chapter	Village
	Barsuu	1385	Grosclaude		Census	
	Barsun	1402	Raymond	22	Census	
	Barssun	1538	Raymond	22	Reformation	
	Barfun	1750	Cassini1			
	Barjun	1790	Cassini2			
Lupié Thén	Le Lupié	1863	Raymond	106		Hamlet
Les Mouras	Les Mouras	1863	Raymond	119		Place
Le Pardiacq	Le Pardiacq	1863	Raymond	131		Place
La Peyrade	La Peyrade	1863	Raymond	134		Place

Sources:

- Raymond: Topographic Dictionary of the Department of Basses-Pyrenees, 1863, on the page numbers indicated in the table. (in French)
- Grosclaude: Toponymic Dictionary of communes, Béarn, 2006 (in French)
- Cassini1: 1750 Cassini Map
- Cassini2: 1790 Cassini Map

Origins:

- Chapter: Titles of the Chapter of Béarn
- Census: Census of Béarn
- Reformation: Reformation of Béarn

== History ==
Paul Raymond noted of page 22 of his 1863 dictionary that Barzun had 13 fires in 1385 and depended on the bailiwick of Pau.

In the 18th century Barzun was the chief town for the notary of Rivière-Ousse which comprised Artigueloutan, Barzun, Espoey, Gomer, Hours, Lée, Livron, Louboey, Lucgarier, Nousty, Ousse, Sendets, and Soumoulou.

== Administration ==
List of Successive Mayors

From	To	Name
1995	2001	Alfred Prat-Bernachot
2001	2020	Maurice Minvielle
2020	2026	René Millet

=== Inter-communality ===
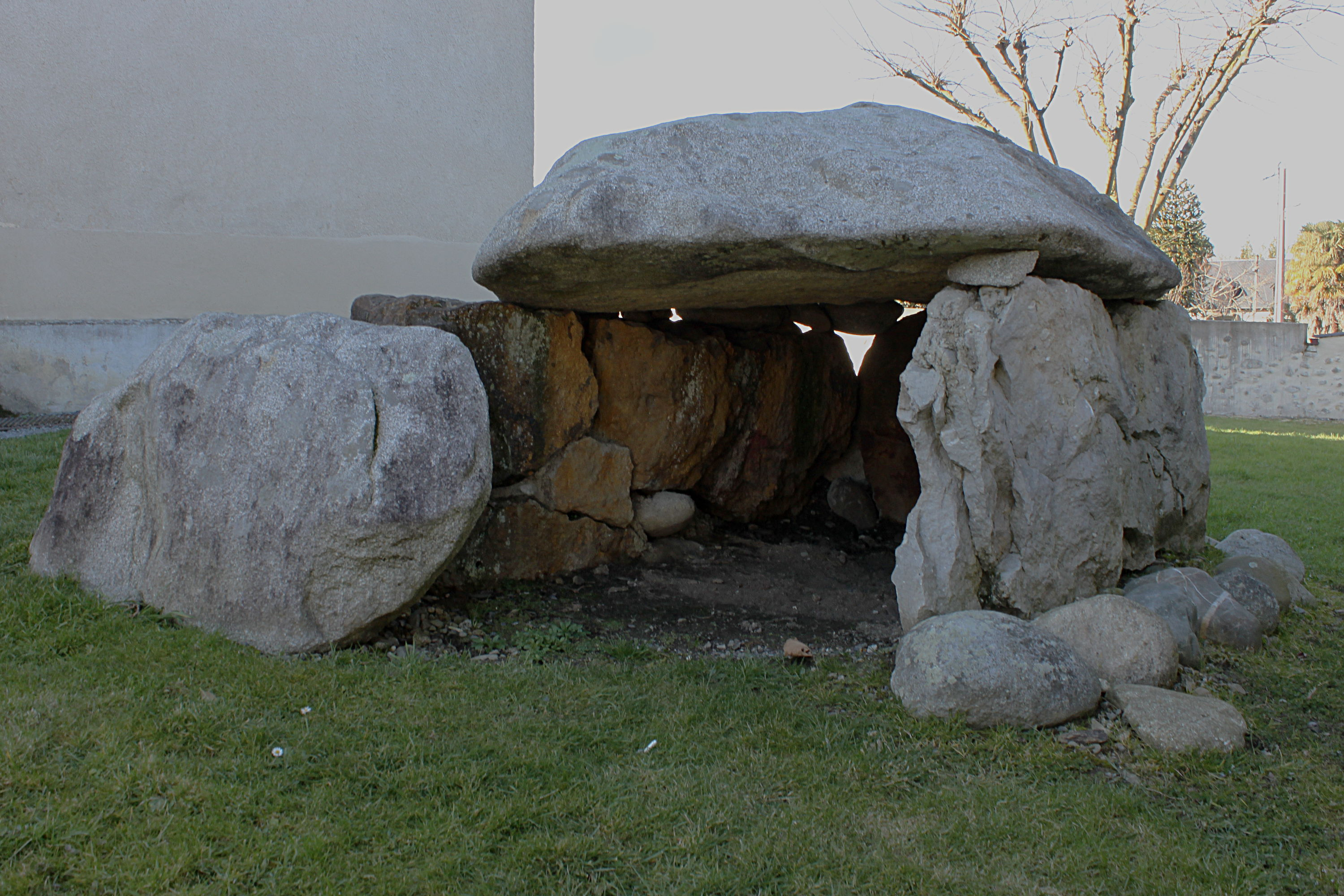
The Barzun dolmen (Neolithic)

The commune is part of four inter-communal structures:

- the Communauté de communes du Nord-Est Béarn;
- the water management association of the Ousse basin
- the Energy association of Pyrénées-Atlantiques;
- the inter-communal association for water and sanitation in the Ousse valley;

=== Education ===
The commune has a public primary school.

== Demography ==
The inhabitants of the commune are known as Barzunais or Barzunaises in French.

Historical population

Year	Pop.	±% p.a.
1793	505	—
1821	607	+0.66%
1846	697	+0.55%
1872	648	−0.28%
1901	519	−0.76%
1926	411	−0.93%
1946	347	−0.84%
1962	409	+1.03%
1968	365	−1.88%

Year	Pop.	±% p.a.
1975	363	−0.08%
1982	401	+1.43%
1990	455	+1.59%
1999	464	+0.22%
2007	608	+3.44%
2012	597	−0.36%
2017	591	−0.20%
2023	626	+0.96%

Source: EHESS and INSEE

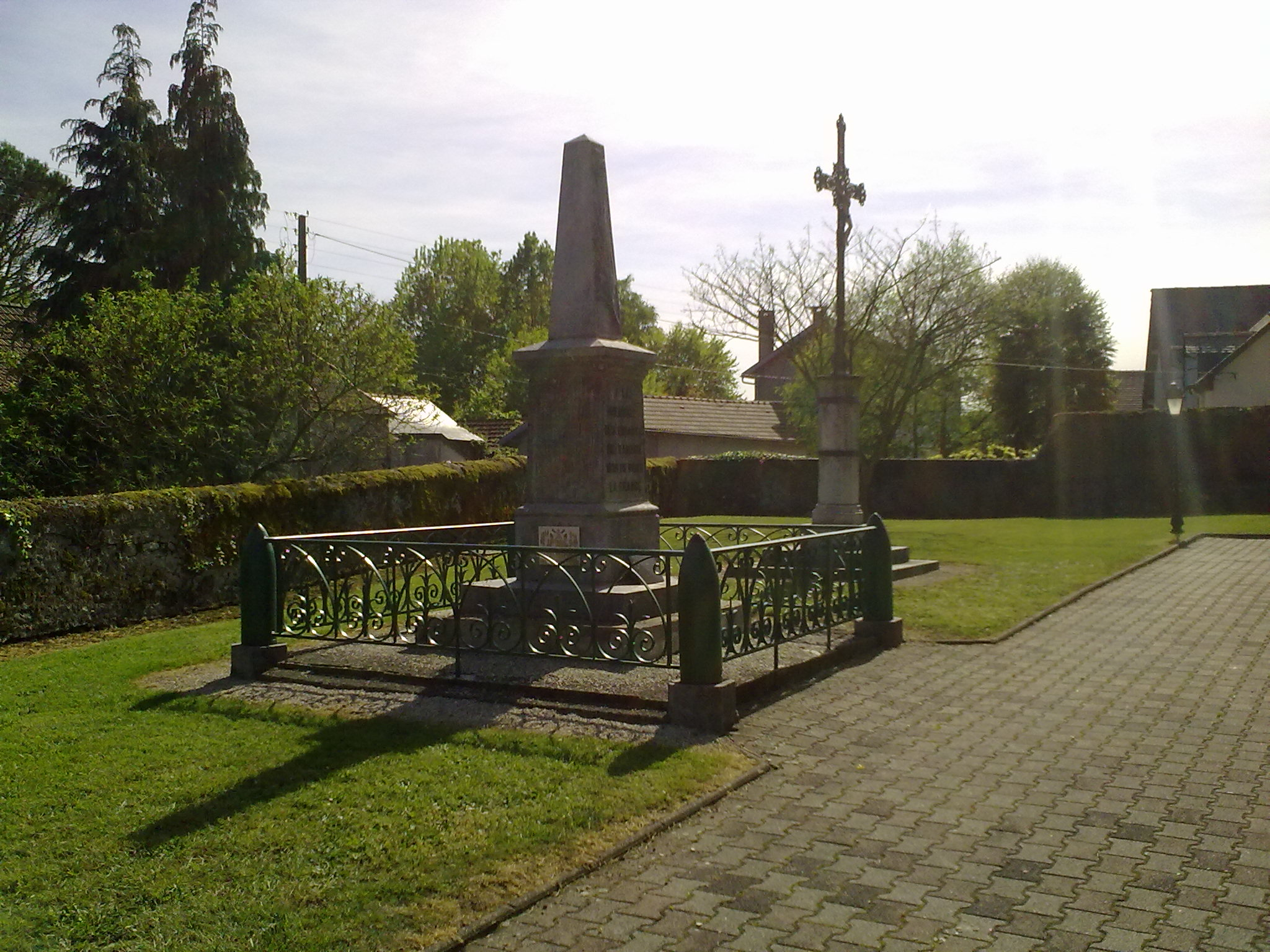
The War Memorial

== Economy ==
The commune is part of the Appellation d'origine contrôlée of Ossau-iraty

== Culture and heritage ==
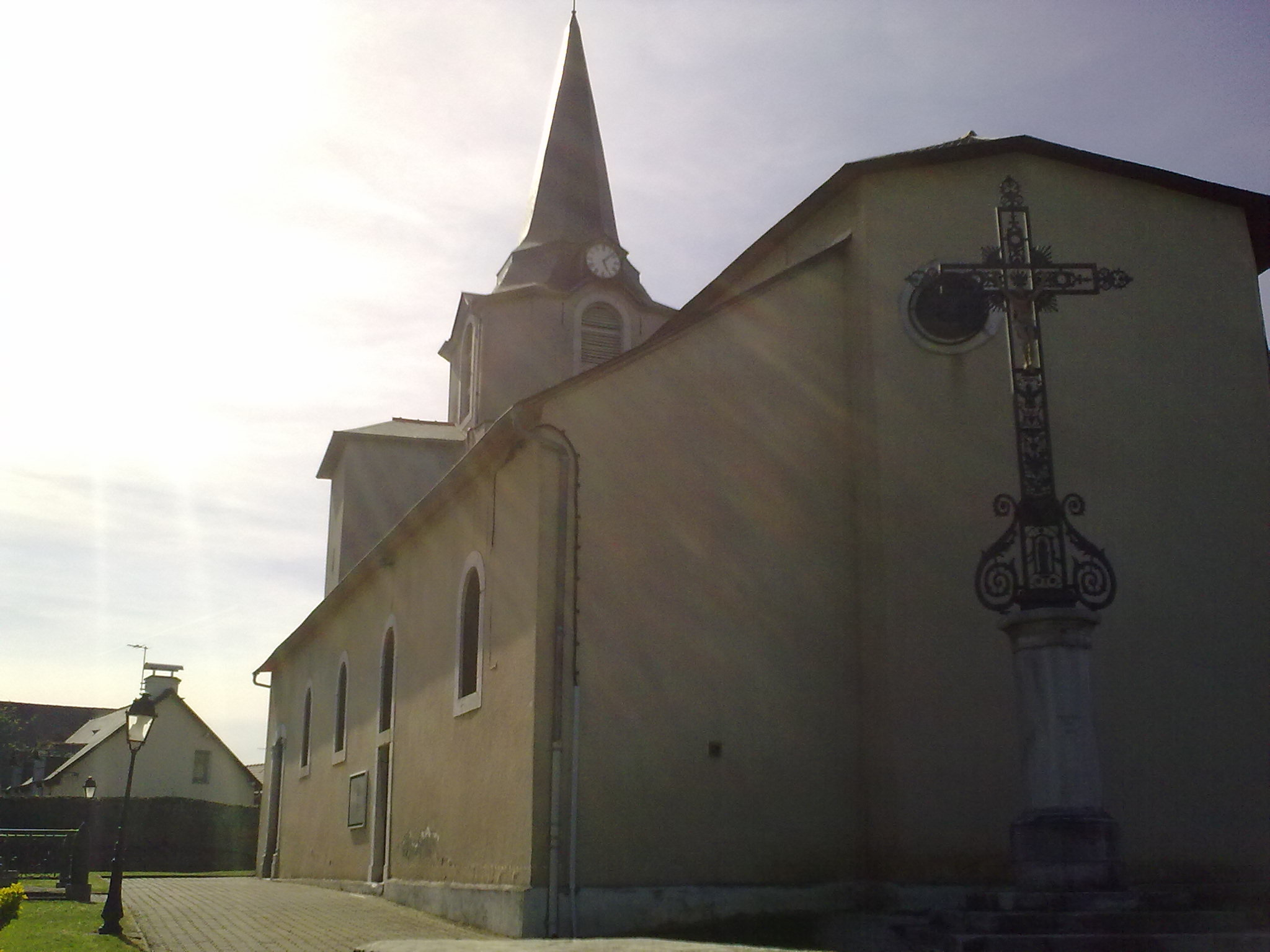
The Church of Saint Vincent Diacre

=== Religious heritage ===
The Parish Church of Saint Vincent Diacre (1854) is registered as an historical monument.

== Notable people linked to the commune ==
- Louis Pardimène, born on 15 July 1880 in Barzun, son of Pierre and Marie Ribes, soldier in the 83rd Infantry Regiment who was shot as an example on 7 January 1915 at Châlons-sur-Marne.
- Pierre-Marie Théas, born in 1894 at Barzun and died in 1977, was a French Catholic religious, Bishop of Montauban then of the Diocese of Tarbes-et-Lourdes.
- Gaëtan Paletou, Racing driver who participated in the 24 Hours of Le Mans in 2015.

== See also ==
- Communes of the Pyrénées-Atlantiques department
