= Barzun =

Barzun may refer to:

- Jacques Barzun, French-American historian
- Matthew Barzun, US diplomat and business executive
- Barzun, Pyrénées-Atlantiques, a town in France
