= Barsun =

Barsun can refer to:

- Young Dirty Bastard (born 1989), an American rapper born Barsun Unique Jones
- Bersone, a former commune in Italy, also called "Barsùn"
- Barzun, Pyrénées-Atlantiques, France, a commune formerly spelled "Barsun"
