= Labatmale =

- Commune
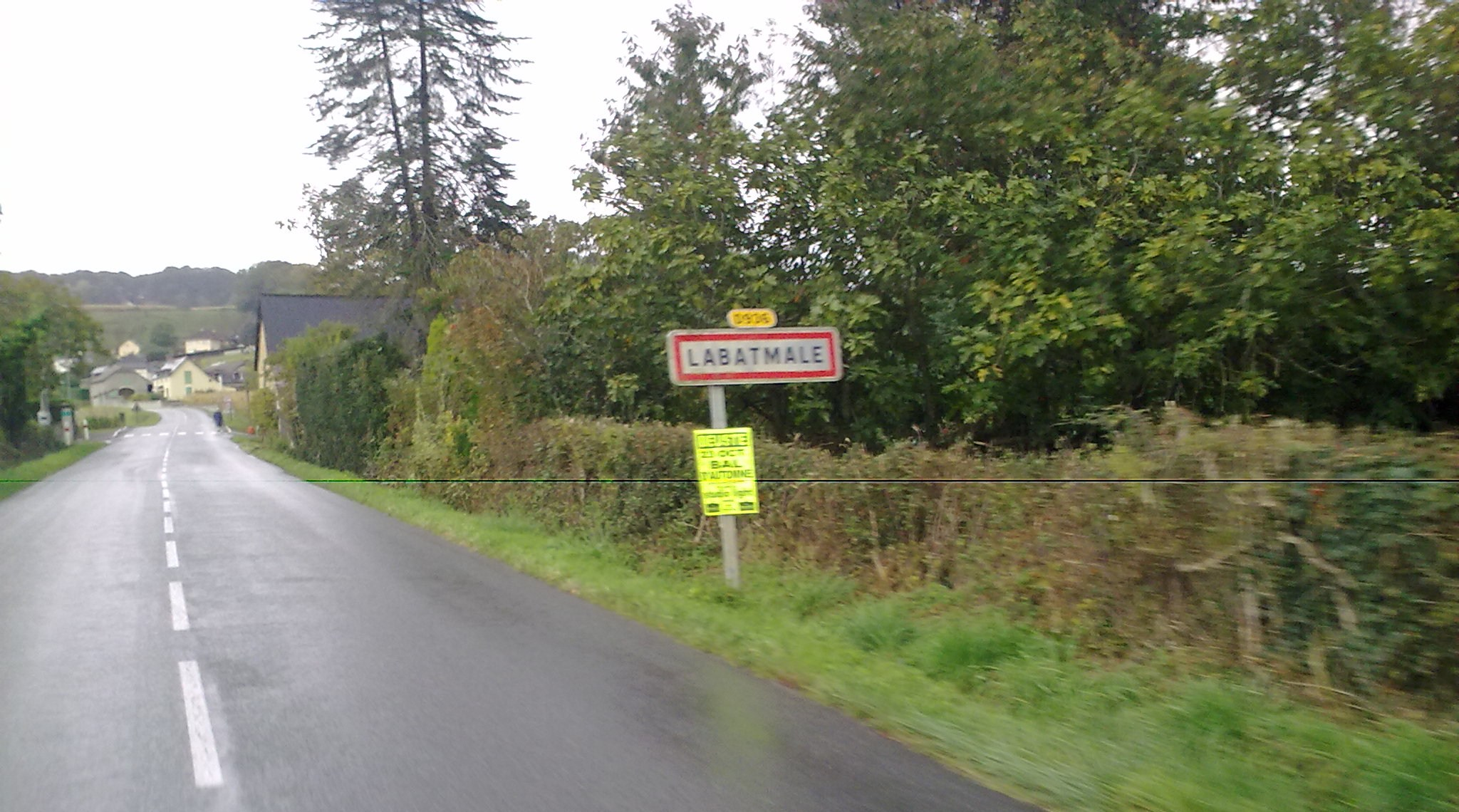
- The road into Labatmale
- Location of Labatmale
- Location within France Location within Nouvelle-Aquitaine
- Coordinates: 43°11′01″N 0°09′03″W
- Country: France
- Region: Nouvelle-Aquitaine
- Department: Pyrénées-Atlantiques
- Arrondissement: Pau
- Canton: Vallées de l'Ousse et du Lagoin

Government
  - Mayor (2020–2026): Florent Lacarrere
- Area^{1}: 3.32 km^{2} (1.28 sq mi)
- Elevation: 380 m (1,250 ft)
- Highest elevation: 480 m (1,570 ft)
- Lowest elevation: 350 m (1,150 ft)
- Population (2023): 257
  - Density: 77.4/km^{2} (200/sq mi)
- Time zone: UTC+01:00 (CET)
  - Summer (DST): UTC+02:00 (CEST)
- INSEE/Postal code: 64292 /64530
- ^{1} French Land Register data, which excludes lakes, ponds, glaciers > 1 km^{2} (0.386 sq mi or 247 acres) and river estuaries.

Labatmale (French pronunciation: [labatmal]; Occitan: La Vatmala) is a commune in the Pyrénées-Atlantiques department in south-west France.

== See also ==
- Communes of the Pyrénées-Atlantiques department
