= Lourenties =

- Commune
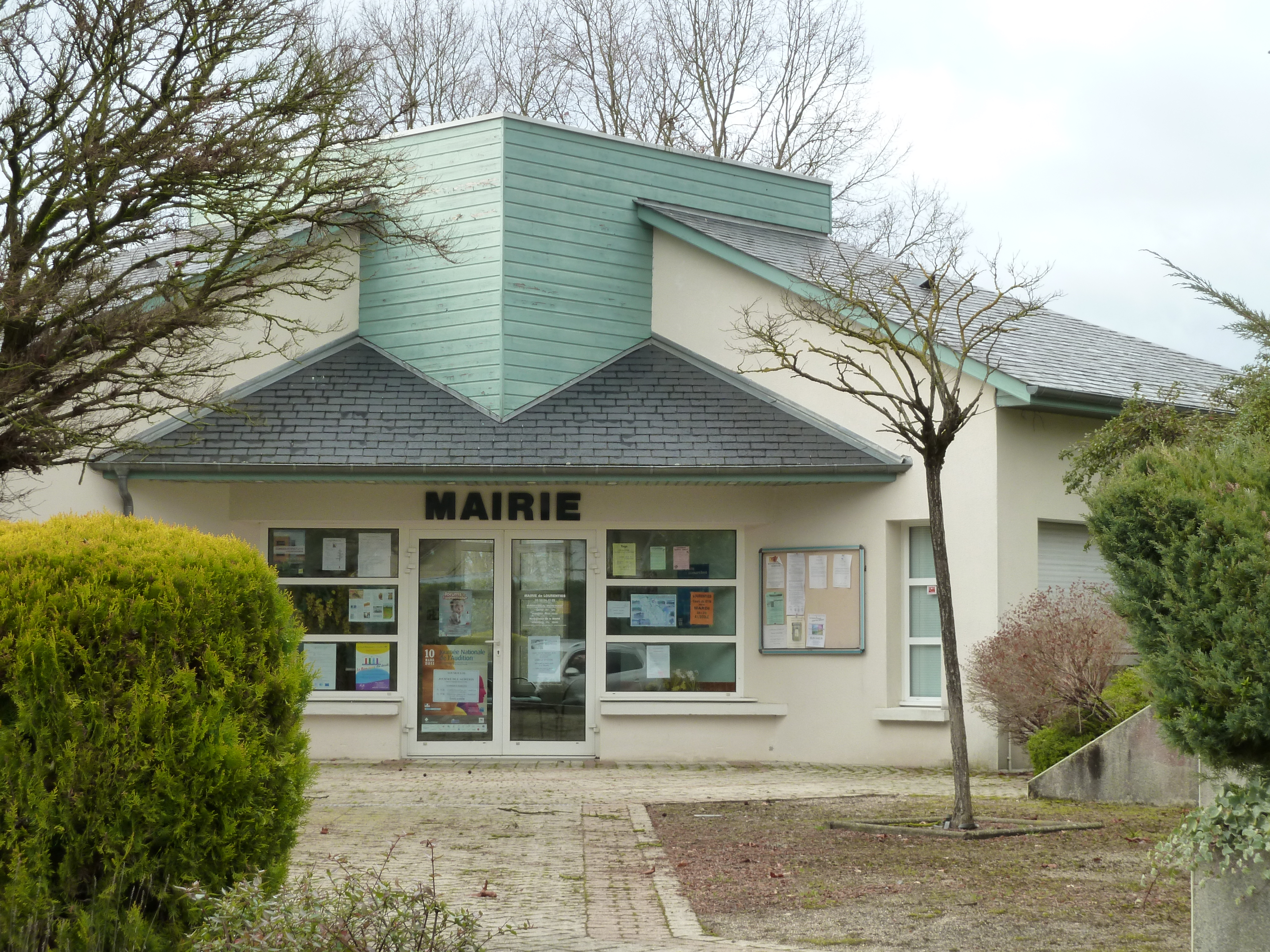
- The town hall of Lourenties
- Location of Lourenties
- Location within France Location within Nouvelle-Aquitaine
- Coordinates: 43°17′23″N 0°09′35″W
- Country: France
- Region: Nouvelle-Aquitaine
- Department: Pyrénées-Atlantiques
- Arrondissement: Pau
- Canton: Vallées de l'Ousse et du Lagoin
- Intercommunality: Nord Est Béarn

Government
  - Mayor (2020–2026): Nadège Mahieu
- Area^{1}: 8.94 km^{2} (3.45 sq mi)
- Elevation: 368 m (1,207 ft)
- Highest elevation: 383 m (1,257 ft)
- Lowest elevation: 320 m (1,050 ft)
- Population (2023): 427
  - Density: 47.8/km^{2} (124/sq mi)
- Time zone: UTC+01:00 (CET)
  - Summer (DST): UTC+02:00 (CEST)
- INSEE/Postal code: 64352 /64420
- ^{1} French Land Register data, which excludes lakes, ponds, glaciers > 1 km^{2} (0.386 sq mi or 247 acres) and river estuaries.

Lourenties (French pronunciation: [luʁɛ̃tis]; Occitan: Hlorentias) is a commune in the Pyrénées-Atlantiques department in south-western France.

== See also ==
- Communes of the Pyrénées-Atlantiques department
