= Bordes, Pyrénées-Atlantiques =

Bordes
- Commune
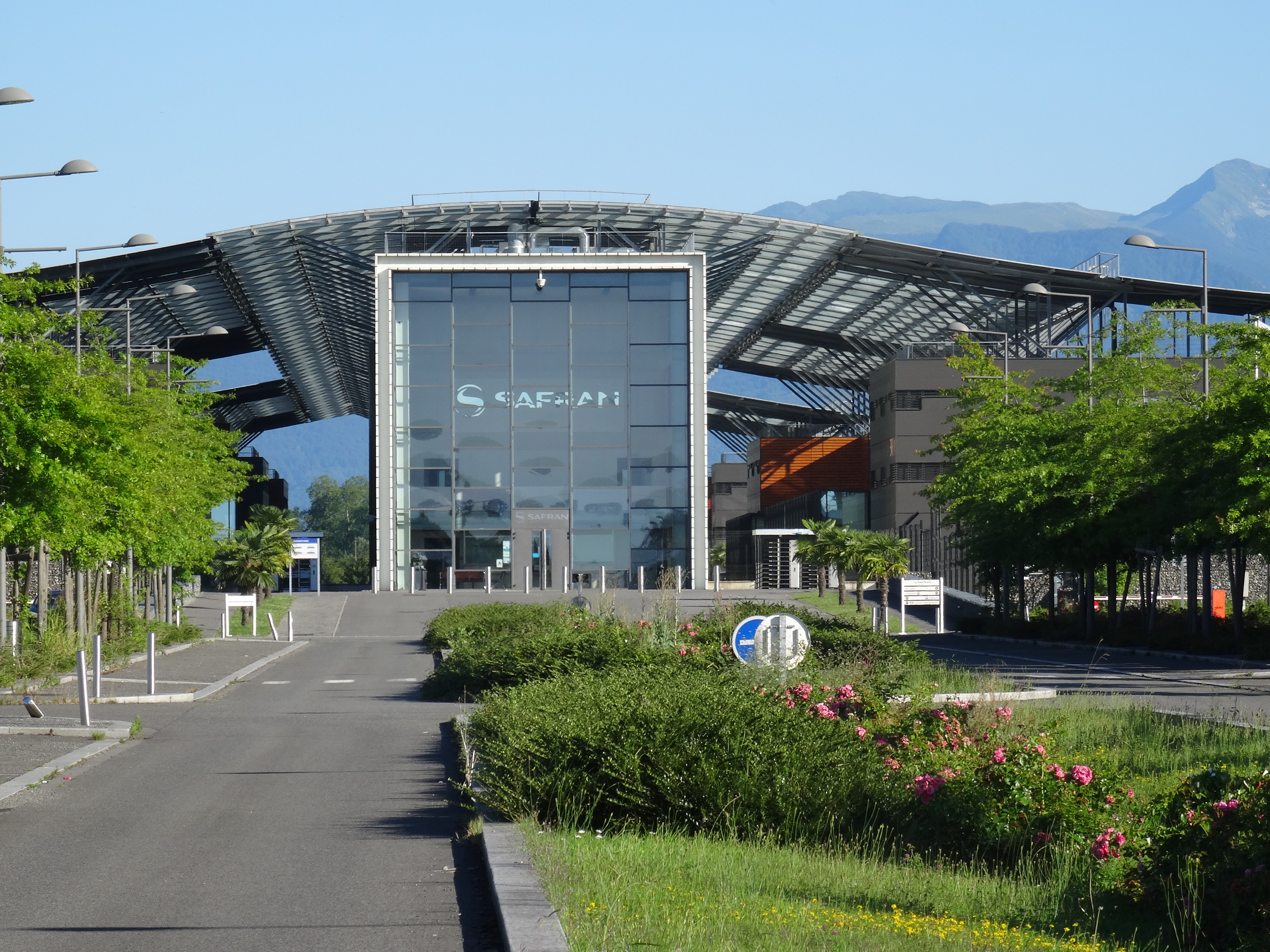
- The headquarters of the Turbomeca plant, in Bordes
- Location of Bordes
- Location within France Location within Nouvelle-Aquitaine
- Coordinates: 43°14′12″N 0°16′51″W
- Country: France
- Region: Nouvelle-Aquitaine
- Department: Pyrénées-Atlantiques
- Arrondissement: Pau
- Canton: Vallées de l'Ousse et du Lagoin

Government
  - Mayor (2020–2026): Serge Castaignau
- Area^{1}: 7.27 km^{2} (2.81 sq mi)
- Elevation: 229 m (751 ft)
- Highest elevation: 361 m (1,184 ft)
- Lowest elevation: 208 m (682 ft)
- Population (2023): 2,872
  - Density: 395/km^{2} (1,020/sq mi)
- Time zone: UTC+01:00 (CET)
  - Summer (DST): UTC+02:00 (CEST)
- INSEE/Postal code: 64138 /64510
- ^{1} French Land Register data, which excludes lakes, ponds, glaciers > 1 km^{2} (0.386 sq mi or 247 acres) and river estuaries.

Bordes (French pronunciation: [bɔʁd]; Occitan: Bòrdas) is a commune in the Pyrénées-Atlantiques department in southwestern France.

== Population ==
Historical population
Year	Pop.	±% p.a.
1968	1,397	—
1975	1,563	+1.62%
1982	1,687	+1.10%
1990	1,652	−0.26%
1999	1,941	+1.81%
2007	2,281	+2.04%
2012	2,659	+3.11%
2017	2,884	+1.64%
2023	2,872	−0.07%
Source: INSEE

== See also ==
- Communes of the Pyrénées-Atlantiques department
