= Saint-Vincent, Pyrénées-Atlantiques =

Saint-Vincent
- Commune
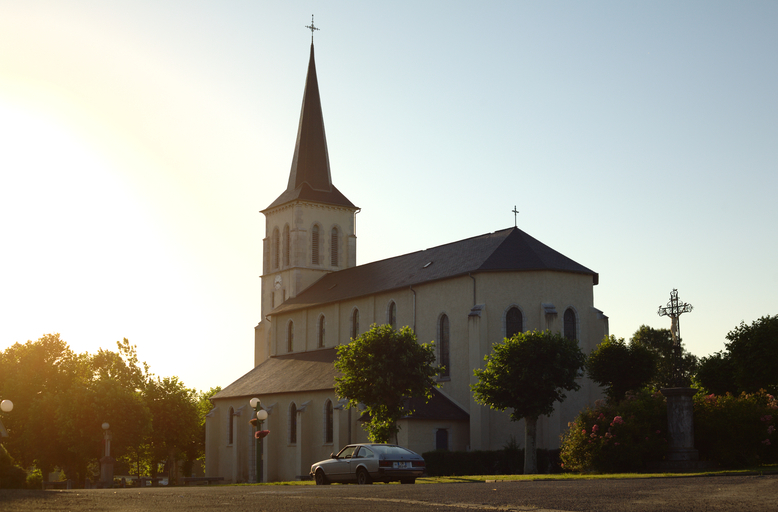
- The church of Saint-Vincent
- Location of Saint-Vincent
- Location within France Location within Nouvelle-Aquitaine
- Coordinates: 43°09′43″N 0°08′49″W
- Country: France
- Region: Nouvelle-Aquitaine
- Department: Pyrénées-Atlantiques
- Arrondissement: Pau
- Canton: Vallées de l'Ousse et du Lagoin

Government
  - Mayor (2020–2026): Roger Doussine
- Area^{1}: 16.61 km^{2} (6.41 sq mi)
- Elevation: 445 m (1,460 ft)
- Highest elevation: 500 m (1,600 ft)
- Lowest elevation: 295 m (968 ft)
- Population (2023): 402
  - Density: 24.2/km^{2} (62.7/sq mi)
- Time zone: UTC+01:00 (CET)
  - Summer (DST): UTC+02:00 (CEST)
- INSEE/Postal code: 64498 /64800
- ^{1} French Land Register data, which excludes lakes, ponds, glaciers > 1 km^{2} (0.386 sq mi or 247 acres) and river estuaries.

Saint-Vincent (French pronunciation: [sɛ̃ vɛ̃sɑ̃]; Gascon: Sent Vincenç) is a commune in the Pyrénées-Atlantiques department in south-western France.

== See also ==
- Communes of the Pyrénées-Atlantiques department
