= Montaut, Pyrénées-Atlantiques =

Montaut
- Commune
- Location of Montaut
- Location within France Location within Nouvelle-Aquitaine
- Coordinates: 43°08′N 0°11′W
- Country: France
- Region: Nouvelle-Aquitaine
- Department: Pyrénées-Atlantiques
- Arrondissement: Pau
- Canton: Vallées de l'Ousse et du Lagoin

Government
  - Mayor (2020–2026): Alain Caperet
- Area^{1}: 15.41 km^{2} (5.95 sq mi)
- Elevation: 315 m (1,033 ft)
- Highest elevation: 553 m (1,814 ft)
- Lowest elevation: 278 m (912 ft)
- Population (2023): 1,120
  - Density: 72.7/km^{2} (188/sq mi)
- Time zone: UTC+01:00 (CET)
  - Summer (DST): UTC+02:00 (CEST)
- INSEE/Postal code: 64400 /64800
- ^{1} French Land Register data, which excludes lakes, ponds, glaciers > 1 km^{2} (0.386 sq mi or 247 acres) and river estuaries.

Montaut (French pronunciation: [mɔ̃to]) is a commune in the Pyrénées-Atlantiques department in south-western France.

== Geography ==
=== Location ===
Montaut is situated at the east of the department, 25 km south-east of Pau. The commune is bordering the department of Hautes-Pyrénées.

=== Access ===
The commune is served by departmental roads 212, 812 and 937 and Line 0535 of the regional buses in the Pyrénées-Atlantiques. Montaut-Bétharram station has rail connections to Tarbes, Pau, Bordeaux and Bayonne.

=== Hydrography ===
The lands of the commune are watered by the Gave of Pau, tributary of the Adour, and by its tributaries, the stream of Siot (fed on Montaut by the streams of the Uchas and Bignes) and the Mouscle, itself joined on the commune by the stream, the Mousclère.

=== Places and Hamlets ===
- Annette
- Loustau
- Pasquine
- Village
- Hameau d'en Bas
- Hameau d'en Haut
- Content
- Sarusse

== Toponymy ==
The toponym Montaut appears in the forms Mont-Altus and the bastide of Montaut (12835 and the 14th century respectively, titles of Béarn) and Montaud (15355, reformation of Béarn).

Its Bearnese name is Montaut or Mountaut.

== History ==
Montaut is a former bastide founded in 1327 by Marguerite de Moncade, the grandmother of Gaston III de Foix-Béarn. The original Bastidian plan still includes the remains of its past.

== See also ==
- Communes of the Pyrénées-Atlantiques department
