= Communes of the Pyrénées-Atlantiques department =

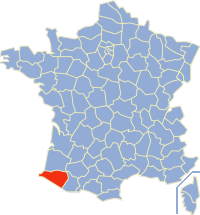

The following is a list of the 545 communes of the Pyrénées-Atlantiques department of France.

The communes cooperate in the following intercommunalities (as of 2025):

- Communauté d'agglomération Pau Béarn Pyrénées
- Communauté d'agglomération du Pays Basque
- Communauté de communes Adour Madiran (partly)
- Communauté de communes du Béarn des Gaves
- Communauté de communes du Haut Béarn
- Communauté de communes de Lacq-Orthez
- Communauté de communes des Luys en Béarn
- Communauté de communes du Nord-Est Béarn
- Communauté de communes du Pays de Nay (partly)
- Communauté de communes de la Vallée d'Ossau

INSEE code	Postal code	Commune
64001	64460	Aast
64002	64160	Abère
64003	64150	Abidos
64004	64390	Abitain
64005	64360	Abos
64006	64490	Accous
64007	64400	Agnos
64008	64220	Ahaxe-Alciette-Bascassan
64009	64210	Ahetze
64010	64120	Aïcirits-Camou-Suhast
64011	64220	Aincille
64012	64130	Ainharp
64013	64220	Ainhice-Mongelos
64014	64250	Ainhoa
64015	64470	Alçay-Alçabéhéty-Sunharette
64016	64430	Aldudes
64017	64470	Alos-Sibas-Abense
64018	64120	Amendeuix-Oneix
64019	64120	Amorots-Succos
64225	64570	Ance Féas
64021	64420	Andoins
64022	64390	Andrein
64023	64510	Angaïs
64024	64600	Anglet
64025	64190	Angous
64026	64220	Anhaux
64027	64160	Anos
64028	64350	Anoye
64029	64570	Aramits
64031	64270	Arancou
64032	64190	Araujuzon
64033	64190	Araux
64034	64120	Arbérats-Sillègue
64035	64210	Arbonne
64036	64120	Arbouet-Sussaute
64037	64230	Arbus
64038	64200	Arcangues
64039	64400	Aren
64041	64320	Aressy
64040	64570	Arette
64042	64300	Argagnon
64043	64450	Argelos
64044	64410	Arget
64045	64120	Arhansus
64046	64640	Armendarits
64047	64220	Arnéguy
64048	64370	Arnos
64049	64120	Aroue-Ithorots-Olhaïby
64050	64130	Arrast-Larrebieu
64051	64120	Arraute-Charritte
64052	64350	Arricau-Bordes
64053	64420	Arrien
64054	64800	Arros-de-Nay
64056	64350	Arrosès
64058	64800	Arthez-d'Asson
64057	64370	Arthez-de-Béarn
64059	64420	Artigueloutan
64060	64230	Artiguelouve
64061	64170	Artix
64062	64260	Arudy
64063	64410	Arzacq-Arraziguet
64064	64660	Asasp-Arros
64065	64310	Ascain
64066	64220	Ascarat
64067	64510	Assat
64068	64800	Asson
64069	64260	Aste-Béon
64070	64450	Astis
64071	64390	Athos-Aspis
64072	64290	Aubertin
64073	64230	Aubin
64074	64330	Aubous
64075	64190	Audaux
64077	64450	Auga
64078	64450	Auriac
64079	64350	Aurions-Idernes
64080	64230	Aussevielle
64081	64130	Aussurucq
64082	64270	Auterrive
64083	64390	Autevielle-Saint-Martin-Bideren
64084	64330	Aydie
64085	64490	Aydius
64086	64240	Ayherre
64087	64300	Baigts-de-Béarn
64088	64300	Balansun
64089	64460	Baleix
64090	64330	Baliracq-Maumusson
64091	64510	Baliros
64092	64430	Banca
64093	64130	Barcus
64094	64520	Bardos
64095	64160	Barinque
64096	64390	Barraute-Camu
64097	64530	Barzun
64098	64350	Bassillon-Vauzé
64100	64200	Bassussarry
64099	64190	Bastanès
64289	64240	La Bastide-Clairence
64101	64800	Baudreix
64102	64100	Bayonne
64103	64460	Bédeille
64104	64490	Bedous
64105	64120	Béguios
64106	64120	Béhasque-Lapiste
64107	64220	Béhorléguy
64108	64270	Bellocq
64109	64800	Bénéjacq
64111	64460	Bentayou-Sérée
64110	64440	Béost
64112	64300	Bérenx
64113	64270	Bergouey-Viellenave
64114	64160	Bernadets
64115	64130	Berrogain-Laruns
64116	64260	Bescat
64117	64150	Bésingrand
64118	64350	Bétracq
64119	64800	Beuste
64121	64230	Beyrie-en-Béarn
64120	64120	Beyrie-sur-Joyeuse
64122	64200	Biarritz
64123	64520	Bidache
64124	64780	Bidarray
64125	64210	Bidart
64126	64400	Bidos
64127	64260	Bielle
64128	64260	Bilhères
64129	64140	Billère
64130	64700	Biriatou
64131	64300	Biron
64132	64320	Bizanos
64133	64510	Boeil-Bezing
64134	64240	Bonloc
64135	64300	Bonnut
64136	64490	Borce
64137	64800	Bordères
64138	64510	Bordes
64139	64290	Bosdarros
64140	64340	Boucau
64141	64330	Boueilh-Boueilho-Lasque
64142	64230	Bougarber
64143	64410	Bouillon
64144	64370	Boumourt
64145	64800	Bourdettes
64146	64450	Bournos
64147	64240	Briscous
64148	64800	Bruges-Capbis-Mifaget
64149	64190	Bugnein
64150	64120	Bunus
64151	64390	Burgaronne
64152	64160	Buros
64153	64330	Burosse-Mendousse
64154	64220	Bussunarits-Sarrasquette
64155	64220	Bustince-Iriberry
64156	64680	Buziet
64157	64260	Buzy
64158	64410	Cabidos
64159	64330	Cadillon
64160	64250	Cambo-les-Bains
64161	64520	Came
64162	64470	Camou-Cihigue
64165	64360	Cardesse
64166	64220	Çaro
64167	64160	Carrère
64168	64270	Carresse-Cassaber
64170	64270	Castagnède
64171	64170	Casteide-Cami
64172	64370	Casteide-Candau
64173	64460	Casteide-Doat
64174	64460	Castéra-Loubix
64175	64260	Castet
64176	64190	Castetbon
64177	64300	Castétis
64178	64190	Castetnau-Camblong
64179	64300	Castetner
64180	64330	Castetpugon
64181	64370	Castillon (Canton of Arthez-de-Béarn)
64182	64350	Castillon (Canton of Lembeye)
64183	64230	Caubios-Loos
64184	64170	Cescau
64185	64490	Cette-Eygun
64186	64190	Charre
64187	64130	Charritte-de-Bas
64188	64130	Chéraute
64189	64500	Ciboure
64190	64330	Claracq
64191	64800	Coarraze
64192	64330	Conchez-de-Béarn
64193	64350	Corbère-Abères
64194	64160	Coslédaà-Lube-Boast
64195	64410	Coublucq
64196	64350	Crouseilles
64197	64360	Cuqueron
64198	64230	Denguin
64199	64330	Diusse
64200	64370	Doazon
64201	64190	Dognen
64202	64120	Domezain-Berraute
64203	64450	Doumy
64204	64440	Eaux-Bonnes
64205	64270	Escos
64206	64490	Escot
64207	64870	Escou
64208	64160	Escoubès
64209	64870	Escout
64210	64350	Escurès
64211	64420	Eslourenties-Daban
64212	64160	Espéchède
64213	64250	Espelette
64214	64130	Espès-Undurein
64215	64390	Espiute
64216	64420	Espoey
64217	64400	Esquiule
64218	64220	Estérençuby
64219	64290	Estialescq
64220	64400	Estos
64221	64120	Etcharry
64222	64470	Etchebar
64223	64490	Etsaut
64224	64400	Eysus
64226	64410	Fichous-Riumayou
64227	64160	Gabaston
64228	64120	Gabat
64229	64220	Gamarthe
64230	64290	Gan
64231	64130	Garindein
64232	64450	Garlède-Mondebat
64233	64330	Garlin
64234	64410	Garos
64235	64120	Garris
64236	64350	Gayon
64237	64110	Gelos
64238	64530	Ger
64239	64160	Gerderest
64240	64260	Gère-Bélesten
64241	64400	Géronce
64242	64190	Gestas
64243	64370	Géus-d'Arzacq
64244	64400	Geüs-d'Oloron
64245	64400	Goès
64246	64420	Gomer
64247	64130	Gotein-Libarrenx
64249	64210	Guéthary
64250	64520	Guiche
64251	64390	Guinarthe-Parenties
64252	64400	Gurmençon
64253	64190	Gurs
64254	64370	Hagetaubin
64255	64480	Halsou
64256	64240	Hasparren
64257	64800	Haut-de-Bosdarros
64258	64470	Haux
64259	64640	Hélette
64260	64700	Hendaye
64261	64680	Herrère
64262	64160	Higuères-Souye
64263	64270	L'Hôpital-d'Orion
64264	64130	L'Hôpital-Saint-Blaise
64265	64120	Hosta
64266	64420	Hours
64267	64120	Ibarrolle
64268	64130	Idaux-Mendy
64269	64320	Idron
64270	64800	Igon
64271	64640	Iholdy
64272	64120	Ilharre
64273	64780	Irissarry
64274	64220	Irouléguy
64275	64220	Ispoure
64276	64570	Issor
64277	64240	Isturits
64279	64250	Itxassou

INSEE code	Postal code	Commune
64280	64260	Izeste
64281	64190	Jasses
64282	64480	Jatxou
64283	64220	Jaxu
64284	64110	Jurançon
64285	64120	Juxue
64286	64300	Laà-Mondrans
64287	64390	Laàs
64288	64170	Labastide-Cézéracq
64290	64170	Labastide-Monréjeau
64291	64270	Labastide-Villefranche
64292	64530	Labatmale
64293	64460	Labatut-Figuières
64294	64120	Labets-Biscay
64295	64300	Labeyrie
64296	64300	Lacadée
64297	64220	Lacarre
64298	64470	Lacarry-Arhan-Charritte-de-Haut
64299	64360	Lacommande
64300	64170	Lacq
64301	64150	Lagor
64302	64800	Lagos
64303	64470	Laguinge-Restoue
64304	64990	Lahonce
64305	64270	Lahontan
64306	64150	Lahourcade
64307	64350	Lalongue
64308	64450	Lalonquette
64309	64460	Lamayou
64311	64350	Lannecaube
64310	64570	Lanne-en-Barétous
64312	64300	Lanneplaà
64313	64640	Lantabat
64314	64120	Larceveau-Arros-Cibits
64315	64110	Laroin
64316	64560	Larrau
64317	64480	Larressore
64318	64410	Larreule
64319	64120	Larribar-Sorhapuru
64320	64440	Laruns
64321	64450	Lasclaveries
64322	64220	Lasse
64323	64350	Lasserre
64324	64290	Lasseube
64325	64290	Lasseubetat
64326	64190	Lay-Lamidou
64327	64220	Lecumberry
64328	64400	Ledeuix
64329	64320	Lée
64330	64490	Lées-Athas
64331	64350	Lembeye
64332	64450	Lème
64334	64270	Léren
64335	64230	Lescar
64336	64490	Lescun
64337	64350	Lespielle
64338	64160	Lespourcy
64339	64800	Lestelle-Bétharram
64340	64470	Lichans-Sunhar
64341	64130	Lichos
64342	64560	Licq-Athérey
64343	64420	Limendous
64344	64530	Livron
64345	64120	Lohitzun-Oyhercq
64346	64160	Lombia
64347	64410	Lonçon
64348	64140	Lons
64349	64300	Loubieng
64350	64250	Louhossoa
64351	64570	Lourdios-Ichère
64352	64420	Lourenties
64353	64260	Louvie-Juzon
64354	64440	Louvie-Soubiron
64355	64410	Louvigny
64356	64350	Luc-Armau
64357	64350	Lucarré
64358	64420	Lucgarier
64359	64360	Lucq-de-Béarn
64360	64660	Lurbe-Saint-Christau
64361	64160	Lussagnet-Lusson
64362	64120	Luxe-Sumberraute
64363	64260	Lys
64364	64240	Macaye
64365	64410	Malaussanne
64366	64330	Mascaraàs-Haron
64367	64300	Maslacq
64368	64120	Masparraute
64369	64350	Maspie-Lalonquère-Juillacq
64370	64160	Maucor
64371	64130	Mauléon-Licharre
64372	64460	Maure
64373	64110	Mazères-Lezons
64374	64230	Mazerolles
64375	64120	Méharin
64376	64510	Meillon
64377	64240	Mendionde
64378	64130	Menditte
64379	64220	Mendive
64380	64410	Méracq
64381	64190	Méritein
64382	64370	Mesplède
64383	64410	Mialos
64385	64450	Miossens-Lanusse
64386	64800	Mirepeix
64387	64230	Momas
64388	64350	Momy
64389	64160	Monassut-Audiracq
64390	64350	Moncaup
64391	64130	Moncayolle-Larrory-Mendibieu
64392	64330	Moncla
64393	64360	Monein
64394	64350	Monpezat
64395	64460	Monségur
64396	64300	Mont
64397	64410	Montagut
64398	64460	Montaner
64399	64121	Montardon
64400	64800	Montaut
64401	64330	Mont-Disse
64403	64190	Montfort
64404	64470	Montory
64405	64160	Morlaàs
64406	64370	Morlanne
64407	64990	Mouguerre
64408	64330	Mouhous
64409	64400	Moumour
64410	64150	Mourenx
64411	64130	Musculdy
64412	64190	Nabas
64413	64510	Narcastet
64414	64190	Narp
64415	64450	Navailles-Angos
64416	64190	Navarrenx
64417	64800	Nay
64418	64150	Noguères
64419	64420	Nousty
64420	64190	Ogenne-Camptort
64421	64680	Ogeu-les-Bains
64422	64400	Oloron-Sainte-Marie
64423	64390	Oraàs
64424	64130	Ordiarp
64425	64120	Orègue
64426	64400	Orin
64427	64390	Orion
64428	64390	Orriule
64429	64120	Orsanco
64430	64300	Orthez
64431	64150	Os-Marsillon
64432	64470	Ossas-Suhare
64433	64490	Osse-en-Aspe
64434	64190	Ossenx
64435	64390	Osserain-Rivareyte
64436	64780	Ossès
64437	64120	Ostabat-Asme
64438	64160	Ouillon
64439	64320	Ousse
64440	64300	Ozenx-Montestrucq
64441	64120	Pagolle
64442	64360	Parbayse
64443	64150	Pardies
64444	64800	Pardies-Piétat
64445	64000	Pau
64446	64350	Peyrelongue-Abos
64447	64410	Piets-Plasence-Moustrou
64448	64230	Poey-de-Lescar
64449	64400	Poey-d'Oloron
64450	64370	Pomps
64451	64460	Ponson-Debat-Pouts
64452	64460	Ponson-Dessus
64453	64530	Pontacq
64454	64460	Pontiacq-Viellepinte
64455	64330	Portet
64456	64410	Pouliacq
64457	64410	Poursiugues-Boucoue
64458	64190	Préchacq-Josbaig
64459	64190	Préchacq-Navarrenx
64460	64400	Précilhon
64461	64270	Puyoô
64462	64270	Ramous
64463	64260	Rébénacq
64464	64330	Ribarrouy
64465	64160	Riupeyrous
64466	64190	Rivehaute
64467	64110	Rontignon
64468	64130	Roquiague
64469	64800	Saint-Abit
64470	64160	Saint-Armou
64471	64300	Saint-Boès
64472	64160	Saint-Castin
64474	64270	Saint-Dos
64473	64260	Sainte-Colome
64475	64560	Sainte-Engrâce
64476	64640	Saint-Esteben
64477	64430	Saint-Étienne-de-Baïgorry
64478	64110	Saint-Faust
64479	64300	Saint-Girons-en-Béarn
64480	64390	Saint-Gladie-Arrive-Munein
64481	64400	Saint-Goin
64482	64160	Saint-Jammes
64483	64500	Saint-Jean-de-Luz
64484	64220	Saint-Jean-le-Vieux
64485	64220	Saint-Jean-Pied-de-Port
64486	64330	Saint-Jean-Poudge
64487	64120	Saint-Just-Ibarre
64488	64160	Saint-Laurent-Bretagne
64489	64640	Saint-Martin-d'Arberoue
64490	64780	Saint-Martin-d'Arrossa
64491	64370	Saint-Médard
64492	64220	Saint-Michel
64493	64120	Saint-Palais
64494	64270	Saint-Pé-de-Léren
64495	64310	Saint-Pée-sur-Nivelle
64496	64990	Saint-Pierre-d'Irube
64498	64800	Saint-Vincent
64499	64270	Salies-de-Béarn
64500	64300	Salles-Mongiscard
64501	64300	Sallespisse
64502	64520	Sames
64503	64350	Samsons-Lion
64504	64310	Sare
64505	64300	Sarpourenx
64506	64490	Sarrance
64507	64420	Saubole
64508	64400	Saucède
64509	64470	Sauguis-Saint-Étienne
64510	64300	Sault-de-Navailles
64511	64230	Sauvagnon
64512	64150	Sauvelade
64513	64390	Sauveterre-de-Béarn
64514	64410	Séby
64515	64160	Sedze-Maubecq
64516	64160	Sedzère
64517	64350	Séméacq-Blachon
64518	64320	Sendets
64519	64121	Serres-Castet
64520	64160	Serres-Morlaàs
64521	64170	Serres-Sainte-Marie
64523	64160	Sévignacq
64522	64260	Sévignacq-Meyracq
64524	64350	Simacourbe
64525	64230	Siros
64526	64420	Soumoulou
64527	64250	Souraïde
64528	64780	Suhescun
64529	64190	Sus
64530	64190	Susmiou
64531	64190	Tabaille-Usquain
64532	64330	Tadousse-Ussau
64533	64470	Tardets-Sorholus
64534	64330	Taron-Sadirac-Viellenave
64535	64360	Tarsacq
64536	64450	Thèze
64537	64470	Trois-Villes
64538	64220	Uhart-Cize
64539	64120	Uhart-Mixe
64540	64990	Urcuit
64542	64490	Urdos
64543	64430	Urepel
64544	64160	Urost
64545	64122	Urrugne
64546	64240	Urt
64547	64480	Ustaritz
64548	64370	Uzan
64549	64230	Uzein
64550	64110	Uzos
64551	64400	Verdets
64552	64330	Vialer
64554	64170	Viellenave-d'Arthez
64555	64190	Viellenave-de-Navarrenx
64556	64150	Vielleségure
64557	64410	Vignes
64558	64990	Villefranque
64559	64130	Viodos-Abense-de-Bas
64560	64450	Viven
