= Canton of Vallées de l'Ousse et du Lagoin =

Coordinates: 43.19°N 0.12°W

The canton of Vallées de l'Ousse et du Lagoin is an administrative division of the Pyrénées-Atlantiques department, southwestern France. It was created at the French canton reorganisation which came into effect in March 2015. Its seat is in Pontacq.

It consists of the following communes:

1. Aast
2. Angaïs
3. Barzun
4. Baudreix
5. Bénéjacq
6. Beuste
7. Boeil-Bezing
8. Bordères
9. Bordes
10. Coarraze
11. Espoey
12. Ger
13. Gomer
14. Hours
15. Igon
16. Labatmale
17. Lagos
18. Lestelle-Bétharram
19. Limendous
20. Livron
21. Lourenties
22. Lucgarier
23. Mirepeix
24. Montaut
25. Nousty
26. Ponson-Dessus
27. Pontacq
28. Saint-Vincent
29. Soumoulou
