= Bénéjacq =

- Commune
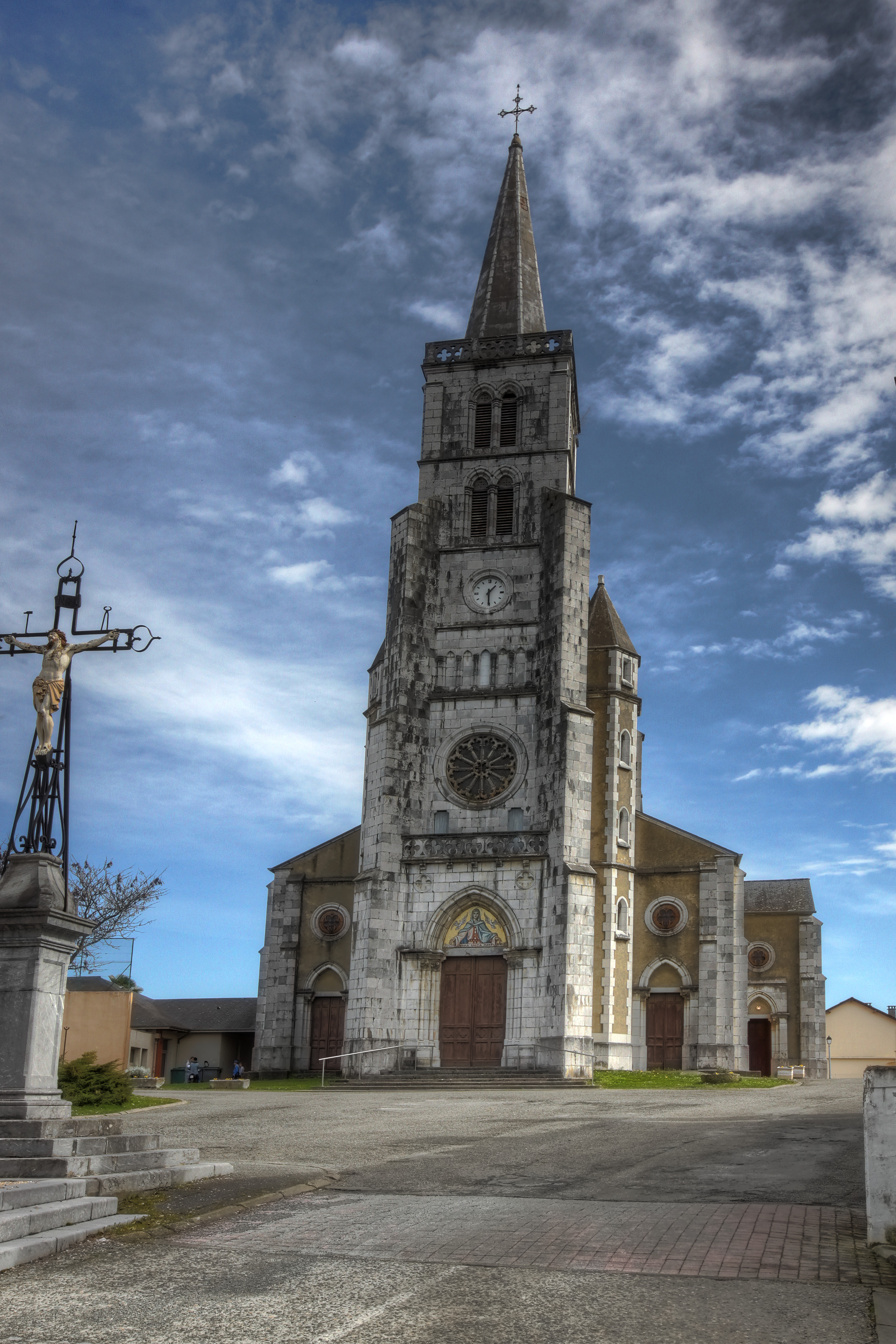
- Church of the Assumption of Our Lady in Bénéjacq
- Location of Bénéjacq
- Location within France Location within Nouvelle-Aquitaine
- Coordinates: 43°11′34″N 0°12′43″W
- Country: France
- Region: Nouvelle-Aquitaine
- Department: Pyrénées-Atlantiques
- Arrondissement: Pau
- Canton: Vallées de l'Ousse et du Lagoin

Government
  - Mayor (2020–2026): Marie-Ange Cazala
- Area^{1}: 17.04 km^{2} (6.58 sq mi)
- Elevation: 249 m (817 ft)
- Highest elevation: 466 m (1,529 ft)
- Lowest elevation: 249 m (817 ft)
- Population (2023): 2,013
  - Density: 118.1/km^{2} (306.0/sq mi)
- Time zone: UTC+01:00 (CET)
  - Summer (DST): UTC+02:00 (CEST)
- INSEE/Postal code: 64109 /64800
- Website: https://benejacq.fr
- ^{1} French Land Register data, which excludes lakes, ponds, glaciers > 1 km^{2} (0.386 sq mi or 247 acres) and river estuaries.

Bénéjacq (French pronunciation: [beneʒak]; Occitan: Benejac) is a commune of the Pyrénées-Atlantiques department in southwestern France.

== Population ==
Historical population
Year	Pop.	±% p.a.
1968	1,363	—
1975	1,350	−0.14%
1982	1,508	+1.59%
1990	1,587	+0.64%
1999	1,603	+0.11%
2007	1,814	+1.56%
2012	1,885	+0.77%
2017	1,942	+0.60%
2023	2,013	+0.60%
Source: INSEE

== See also ==
- Communes of the Pyrénées-Atlantiques department
