= Mirepeix =

- Commune
- Coat of arms
- Location of Mirepeix
- Location within France Location within Nouvelle-Aquitaine
- Coordinates: 43°11′24″N 0°14′59″W
- Country: France
- Region: Nouvelle-Aquitaine
- Department: Pyrénées-Atlantiques
- Arrondissement: Pau
- Canton: Vallées de l'Ousse et du Lagoin
- Intercommunality: Pays de Nay

Government
  - Mayor (2020–2026): Stéphane Virto
- Area^{1}: 3.29 km^{2} (1.27 sq mi)
- Elevation: 262 m (860 ft)
- Highest elevation: 264 m (866 ft)
- Lowest elevation: 235 m (771 ft)
- Population (2023): 1,255
  - Density: 381/km^{2} (988/sq mi)
- Time zone: UTC+01:00 (CET)
  - Summer (DST): UTC+02:00 (CEST)
- INSEE/Postal code: 64386 /64800
- ^{1} French Land Register data, which excludes lakes, ponds, glaciers > 1 km^{2} (0.386 sq mi or 247 acres) and river estuaries.

Mirepeix (French pronunciation: [miʁpɛks]; Occitan: Mirapeish) is a commune in the Pyrénées-Atlantiques department in south-western France.

== See also ==
- Communes of the Pyrénées-Atlantiques department
