= Boeil-Bezing =

- Commune
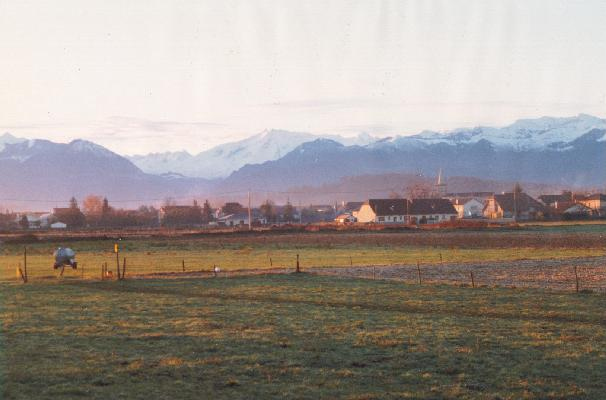
- A general view of Boeil-Bezing
- Location of Boeil-Bezing
- Location within France Location within Nouvelle-Aquitaine
- Coordinates: 43°13′20″N 0°15′55″W
- Country: France
- Region: Nouvelle-Aquitaine
- Department: Pyrénées-Atlantiques
- Arrondissement: Pau
- Canton: Vallées de l'Ousse et du Lagoin
- Intercommunality: Pays de Nay

Government
  - Mayor (2020–2026): Marc Dufau
- Area^{1}: 8.50 km^{2} (3.28 sq mi)
- Elevation: 234 m (768 ft)
- Highest elevation: 412 m (1,352 ft)
- Lowest elevation: 218 m (715 ft)
- Population (2023): 1,341
  - Density: 158/km^{2} (409/sq mi)
- Time zone: UTC+01:00 (CET)
  - Summer (DST): UTC+02:00 (CEST)
- INSEE/Postal code: 64133 /64510
- ^{1} French Land Register data, which excludes lakes, ponds, glaciers > 1 km^{2} (0.386 sq mi or 247 acres) and river estuaries.

Boeil-Bezing (French pronunciation: [bɔ.ɛj bəzɛ̃]; Occitan: Buelh e Vesinc) is a commune in the Pyrénées-Atlantiques department in southwestern France.

The municipality of Boeil-Bezing arises in 1867 from the meeting of both villages of Boeil and Bezing, situated along the banks of the mountain stream of Pau, on territories rich in alluviums useful for the agriculture.

== See also ==
- Communes of the Pyrénées-Atlantiques department
