= Lagos, Pyrénées-Atlantiques =

Commune in France

Lagos
- Commune
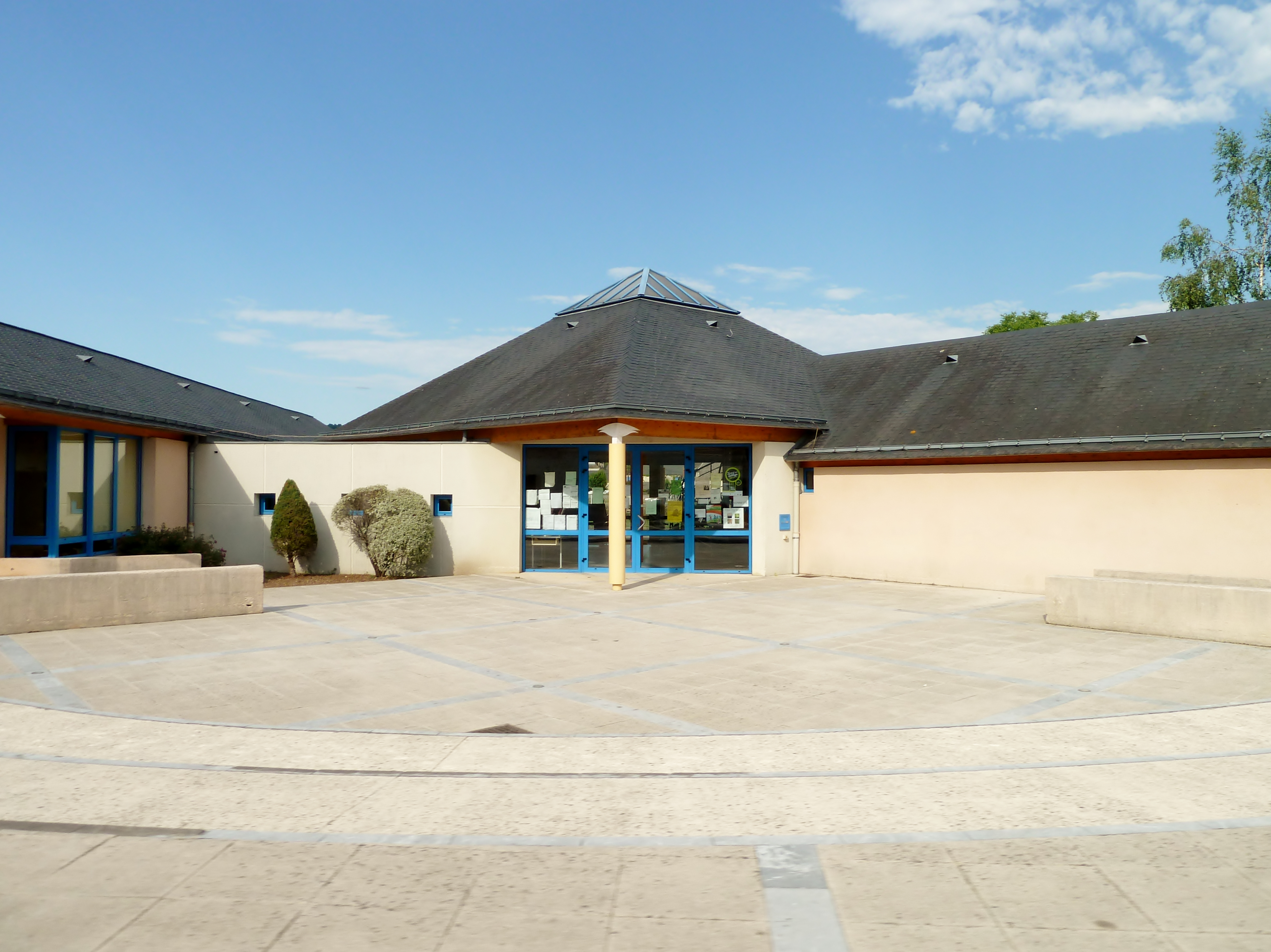
- Town Hall

- Coat of arms
- Location of Lagos
- Location within France Location within Nouvelle-Aquitaine
- Coordinates: 43°12′35″N 0°13′25″W
- Country: France
- Region: Nouvelle-Aquitaine
- Department: Pyrénées-Atlantiques
- Arrondissement: Pau
- Canton: Vallées de l'Ousse et du Lagoin
- Intercommunality: Pays de Nay

Government
  - Mayor (2020–2026): Christian Petchot-Bacqué
- Area^{1}: 4.46 km^{2} (1.72 sq mi)
- Elevation: 257 m (843 ft)
- Highest elevation: 418 m (1,371 ft)
- Lowest elevation: 242 m (794 ft)
- Population (2023): 473
  - Density: 106/km^{2} (275/sq mi)
- Time zone: UTC+01:00 (CET)
  - Summer (DST): UTC+02:00 (CEST)
- INSEE/Postal code: 64302 /64800
- ^{1} French Land Register data, which excludes lakes, ponds, glaciers > 1 km^{2} (0.386 sq mi or 247 acres) and river estuaries.

Lagos (French pronunciation: [laɡɔs]; Occitan: Lagòs) is a commune in the Pyrénées-Atlantiques department in south-western France.

== See also ==
- Communes of the Pyrénées-Atlantiques department
