= Gomer, Pyrénées-Atlantiques =

Gomer
- Commune
- Location of Gomer
- Location within France Location within Nouvelle-Aquitaine
- Coordinates: 43°15′02″N 0°11′20″W
- Country: France
- Region: Nouvelle-Aquitaine
- Department: Pyrénées-Atlantiques
- Arrondissement: Pau
- Canton: Vallées de l'Ousse et du Lagoin
- Intercommunality: Nord Est Béarn

Government
  - Mayor (2020–2026): Marie-Pierre Cabanne
- Area^{1}: 3.24 km^{2} (1.25 sq mi)
- Elevation: 296 m (971 ft)
- Highest elevation: 385 m (1,263 ft)
- Lowest elevation: 277 m (909 ft)
- Population (2023): 298
  - Density: 92.0/km^{2} (238/sq mi)
- Time zone: UTC+01:00 (CET)
  - Summer (DST): UTC+02:00 (CEST)
- INSEE/Postal code: 64246 /64420
- ^{1} French Land Register data, which excludes lakes, ponds, glaciers > 1 km^{2} (0.386 sq mi or 247 acres) and river estuaries.

Gomer (French pronunciation: [ɡɔmɛʁ]; Occitan: Gomèr) is a commune in the Pyrénées-Atlantiques department in south-western France.

== See also ==
- Communes of the Pyrénées-Atlantiques department
