= Livron =

- Commune
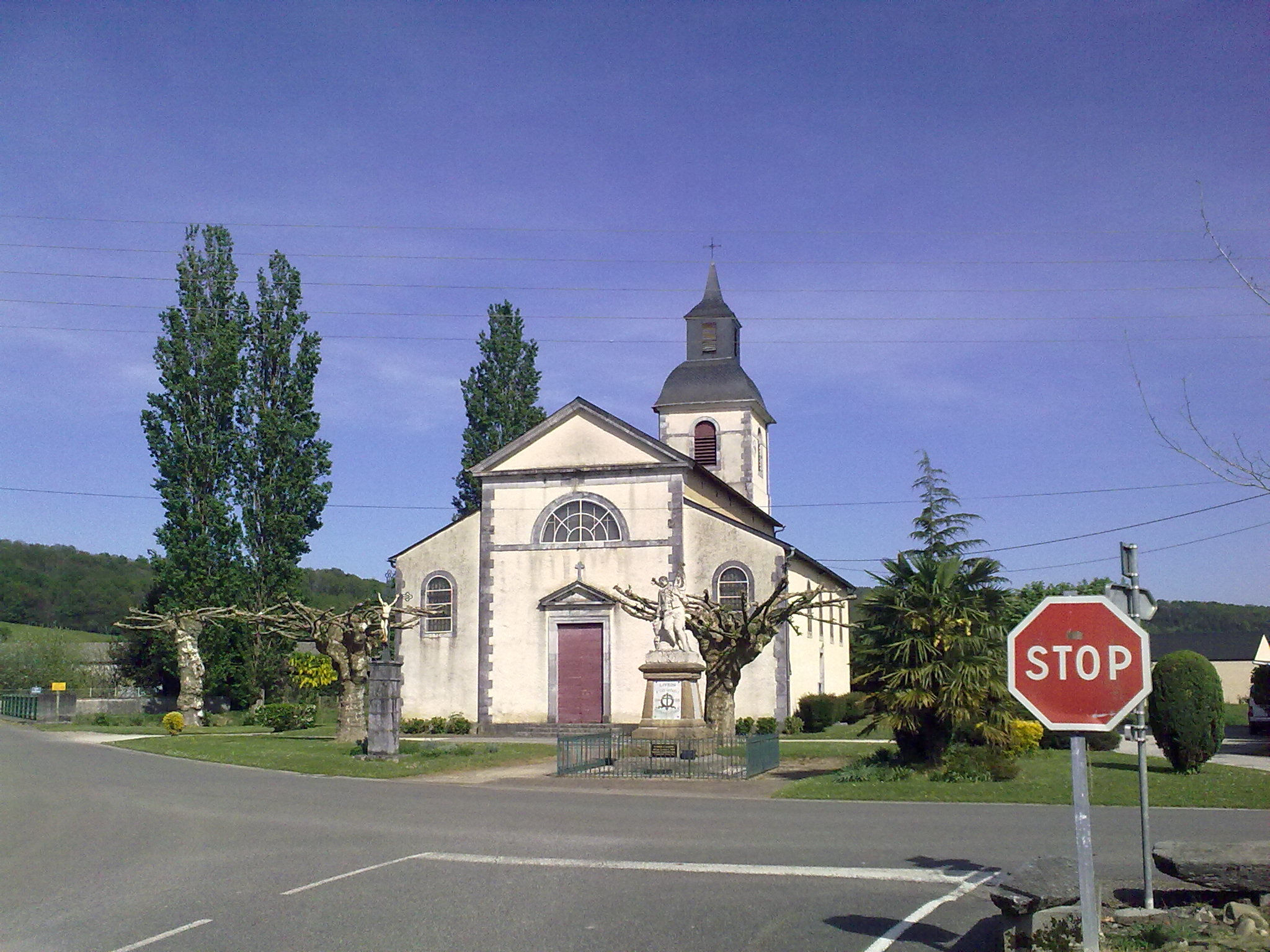
- Church
- Location of Livron
- Location within France Location within Nouvelle-Aquitaine
- Coordinates: 43°13′38″N 0°08′23″W
- Country: France
- Region: Nouvelle-Aquitaine
- Department: Pyrénées-Atlantiques
- Arrondissement: Pau
- Canton: Vallées de l'Ousse et du Lagoin
- Intercommunality: Nord Est Béarn

Government
  - Mayor (2022–2026): Véronique Monnin
- Area^{1}: 7.54 km^{2} (2.91 sq mi)
- Elevation: 414 m (1,358 ft)
- Highest elevation: 423 m (1,388 ft)
- Lowest elevation: 307 m (1,007 ft)
- Population (2023): 380
  - Density: 50/km^{2} (130/sq mi)
- Time zone: UTC+01:00 (CET)
  - Summer (DST): UTC+02:00 (CEST)
- INSEE/Postal code: 64344 /64530
- ^{1} French Land Register data, which excludes lakes, ponds, glaciers > 1 km^{2} (0.386 sq mi or 247 acres) and river estuaries.

Livron (French pronunciation: [livʁɔ̃]; Occitan: Liuron) is a commune in the Pyrénées-Atlantiques department in south-western France.

== See also ==
- Communes of the Pyrénées-Atlantiques department
