= Espoey =

- Commune
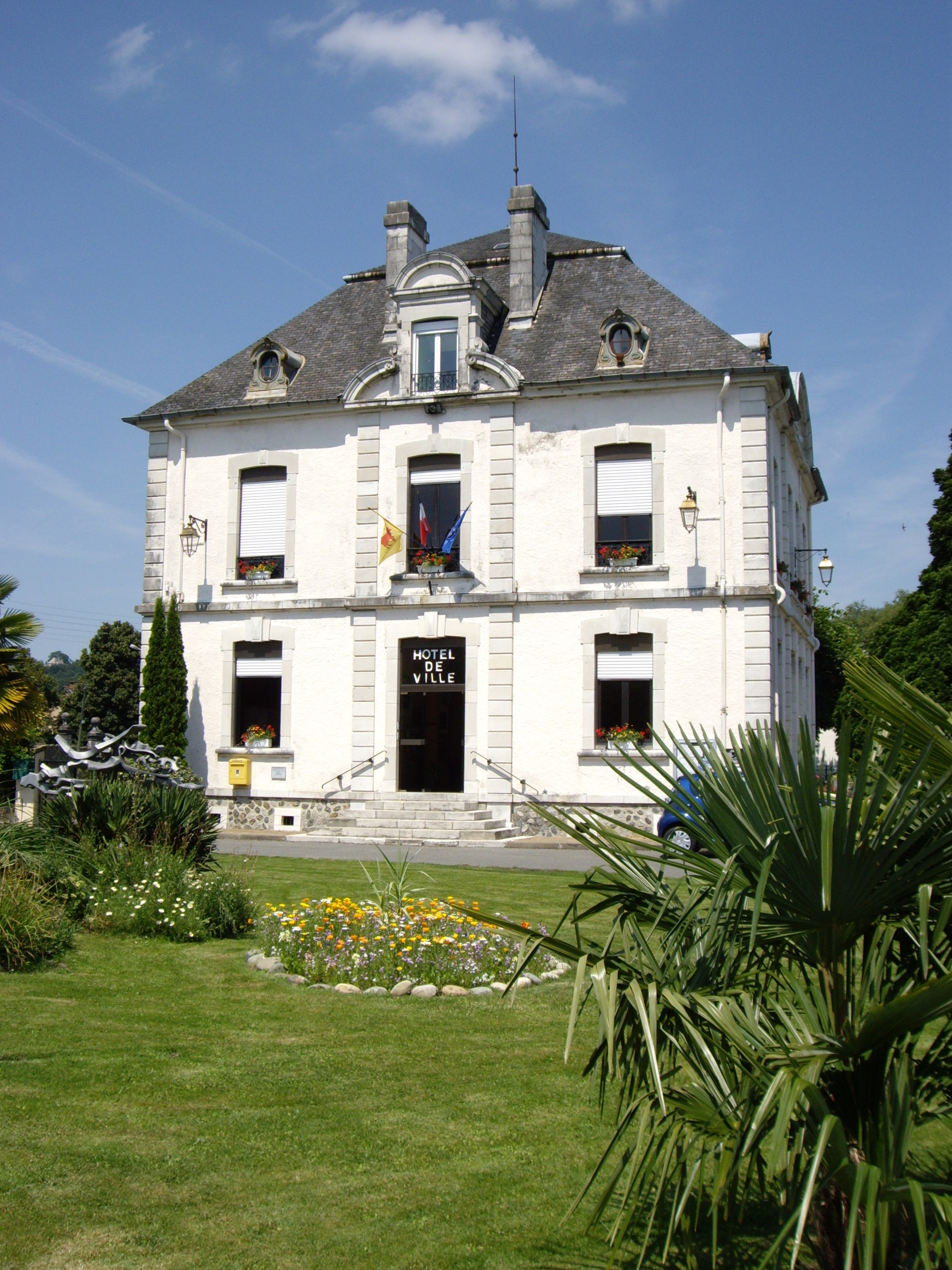
- Town Hall
- Location of Espoey
- Location within France Location within Nouvelle-Aquitaine
- Coordinates: 43°14′38″N 0°09′53″W
- Country: France
- Region: Nouvelle-Aquitaine
- Department: Pyrénées-Atlantiques
- Arrondissement: Pau
- Canton: Vallées de l'Ousse et du Lagoin
- Intercommunality: Nord Est Béarn

Government
  - Mayor (2020–2026): Jean-Pierre Moura
- Area^{1}: 13.43 km^{2} (5.19 sq mi)
- Elevation: 299 m (981 ft)
- Highest elevation: 405 m (1,329 ft)
- Lowest elevation: 284 m (932 ft)
- Population (2023): 1,223
  - Density: 91.06/km^{2} (235.9/sq mi)
- Time zone: UTC+01:00 (CET)
  - Summer (DST): UTC+02:00 (CEST)
- INSEE/Postal code: 64216 /64420
- ^{1} French Land Register data, which excludes lakes, ponds, glaciers > 1 km^{2} (0.386 sq mi or 247 acres) and river estuaries.

Espoey (French pronunciation: [ɛspwɛj]; Occitan: Espuei) is a commune in the Pyrénées-Atlantiques department in south-western France.

== See also ==
- Communes of the Pyrénées-Atlantiques department
