= Hours, Pyrénées-Atlantiques =

Hours
- Commune
- Location of Hours
- Location within France Location within Nouvelle-Aquitaine
- Coordinates: 43°13′45″N 0°10′04″W
- Country: France
- Region: Nouvelle-Aquitaine
- Department: Pyrénées-Atlantiques
- Arrondissement: Pau
- Canton: Vallées de l'Ousse et du Lagoin
- Intercommunality: Nord Est Béarn

Government
  - Mayor (2024–2026): Christophe Pondet
- Area^{1}: 5.79 km^{2} (2.24 sq mi)
- Elevation: 322 m (1,056 ft)
- Highest elevation: 421 m (1,381 ft)
- Lowest elevation: 306 m (1,004 ft)
- Population (2023): 231
  - Density: 39.9/km^{2} (103/sq mi)
- Time zone: UTC+01:00 (CET)
  - Summer (DST): UTC+02:00 (CEST)
- INSEE/Postal code: 64266 /64420
- ^{1} French Land Register data, which excludes lakes, ponds, glaciers > 1 km^{2} (0.386 sq mi or 247 acres) and river estuaries.

Hours (Occitan: Òras) is a commune in the Pyrénées-Atlantiques department in south-western France.

== See also ==
- Communes of the Pyrénées-Atlantiques department
