= Pontacq =

- Commune
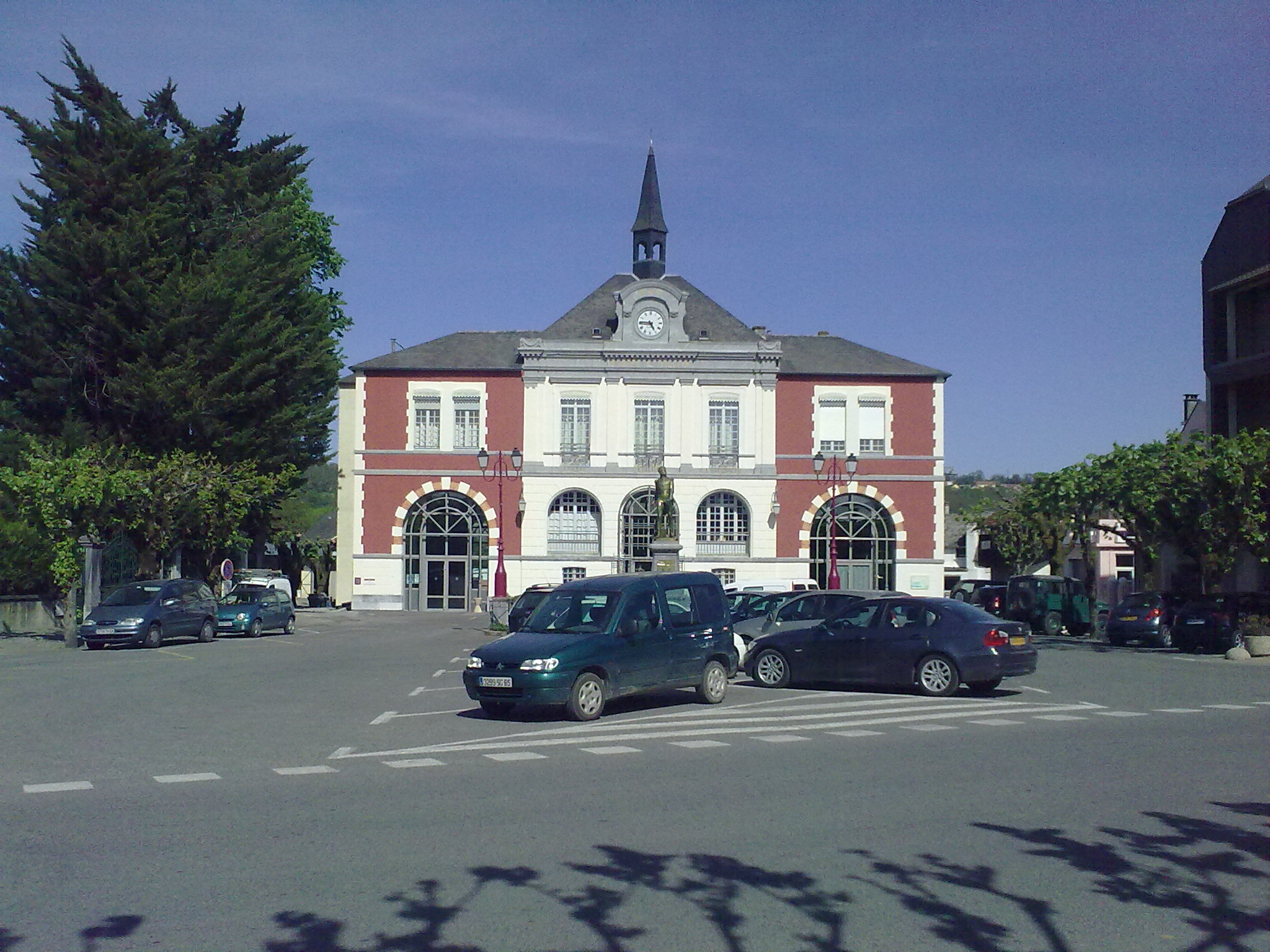
- Town Hall

- Coat of arms
- Location of Pontacq
- Location within France Location within Nouvelle-Aquitaine
- Coordinates: 43°11′11″N 0°06′46″W
- Country: France
- Region: Nouvelle-Aquitaine
- Department: Pyrénées-Atlantiques
- Arrondissement: Pau
- Canton: Vallées de l'Ousse et du Lagoin

Government
  - Mayor (2020–2026): Didier Larrazabal
- Area^{1}: 28.85 km^{2} (11.14 sq mi)
- Population (2023): 2,925
  - Density: 101.4/km^{2} (262.6/sq mi)
- Time zone: UTC+01:00 (CET)
  - Summer (DST): UTC+02:00 (CEST)
- INSEE/Postal code: 64453 /64530
- Elevation: 337–488 m (1,106–1,601 ft) (avg. 358 m or 1,175 ft)
- ^{1} French Land Register data, which excludes lakes, ponds, glaciers > 1 km^{2} (0.386 sq mi or 247 acres) and river estuaries.

Pontacq (French pronunciation: [pɔ̃tak]; Occitan: Pontac) is a commune in the Pyrénées-Atlantiques department in south-western France. The town is placed near the Ousse river valley and the Pyrenees, lying close to Lourdes, a pilgrimage site.

Pontacq is managed by a municipal council, currently led by Mayor Didier Larrazabal (2020-05-26). The town is home to approximately 2,936 residents and covers an area of around 29 square kilometers.

== Population ==
Historical population
Year	Pop.	±% p.a.
1968	2,402	—
1975	2,328	−0.45%
1982	2,534	+1.22%
1990	2,683	+0.72%
1999	2,611	−0.30%
2007	2,820	+0.97%
2012	2,867	+0.33%
2017	2,936	+0.48%
2023	2,925	−0.06%
Source: INSEE

== Notable people ==
- Joseph Barbanègre (1772–1830) - French General
- Pierre Lacaze (1934-1995) - Athlete, Rugby Union & League player
- Claude Lacaze (1940-2026) - Rugby Union player
- Matthieu Sans (1988-) - Rugby player

== See also ==
- Communes of the Pyrénées-Atlantiques department
