= Soumoulou =

- Commune
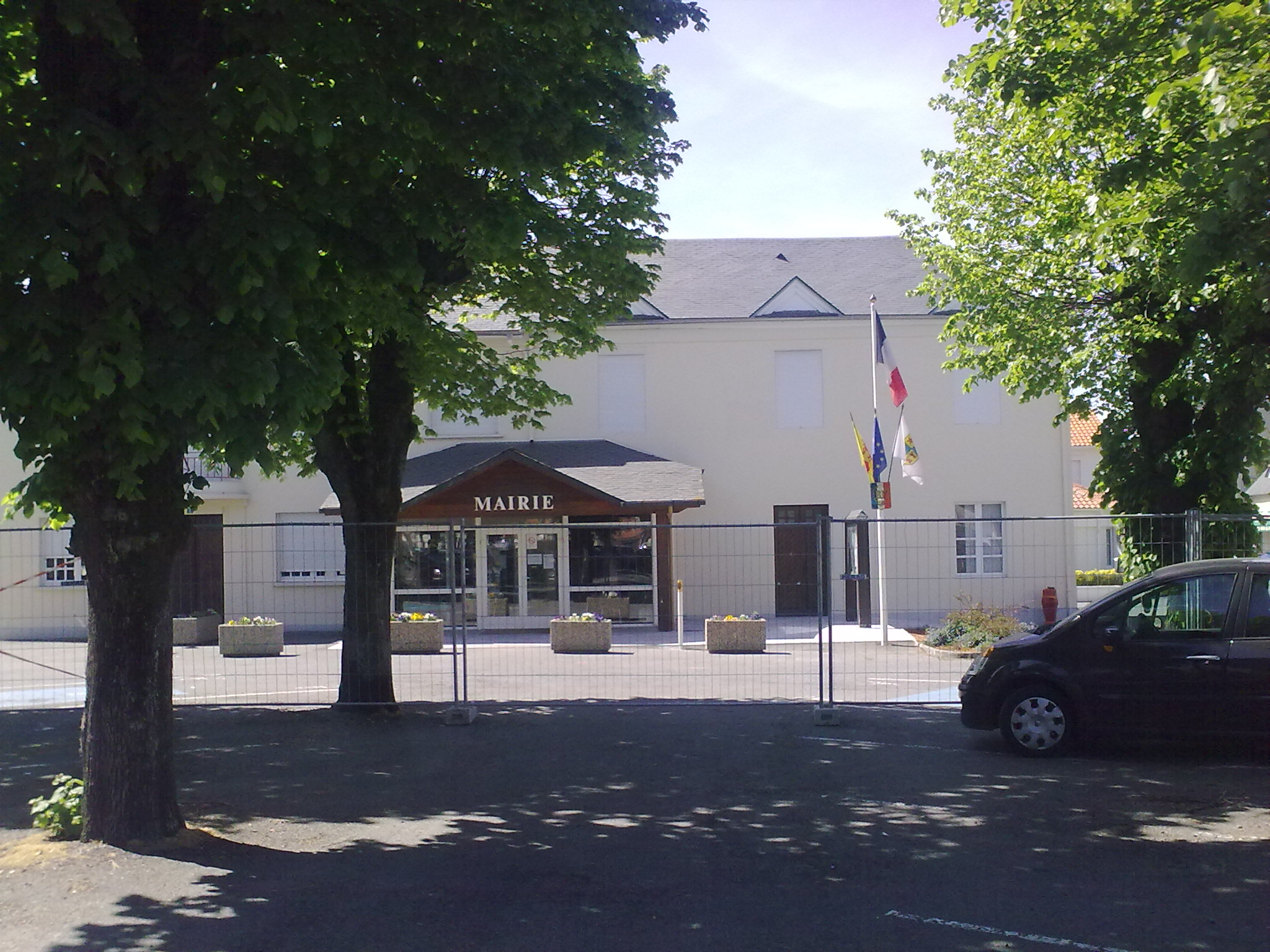
- Town Hall

- Coat of arms
- Location of Soumoulou
- Location within France Location within Nouvelle-Aquitaine
- Coordinates: 43°16′03″N 0°11′20″W
- Country: France
- Region: Nouvelle-Aquitaine
- Department: Pyrénées-Atlantiques
- Arrondissement: Pau
- Canton: Vallées de l'Ousse et du Lagoin
- Intercommunality: Nord Est Béarn

Government
  - Mayor (2020–2026): Alain Trépeu
- Area^{1}: 2.79 km^{2} (1.08 sq mi)
- Elevation: 371 m (1,217 ft)
- Highest elevation: 309 m (1,014 ft)
- Lowest elevation: 272 m (892 ft)
- Population (2023): 1,583
  - Density: 567/km^{2} (1,470/sq mi)
- Time zone: UTC+01:00 (CET)
  - Summer (DST): UTC+02:00 (CEST)
- INSEE/Postal code: 64526 /64420
- ^{1} French Land Register data, which excludes lakes, ponds, glaciers > 1 km^{2} (0.386 sq mi or 247 acres) and river estuaries.

Soumoulou (French pronunciation: [sumulu]; Occitan: Somolon) is a commune in the French department of the Pyrénées-Atlantiques, region of Nouvelle-Aquitaine (before 2015: Aquitaine), southwestern France. It is 120 km (75 mi) from the Basque Coast and the beaches south of the Landes coast and 70 km (43 mi) from the Pyrenees.

== See also ==
- Communes of the Pyrénées-Atlantiques department
