= Baudreix =

- Commune
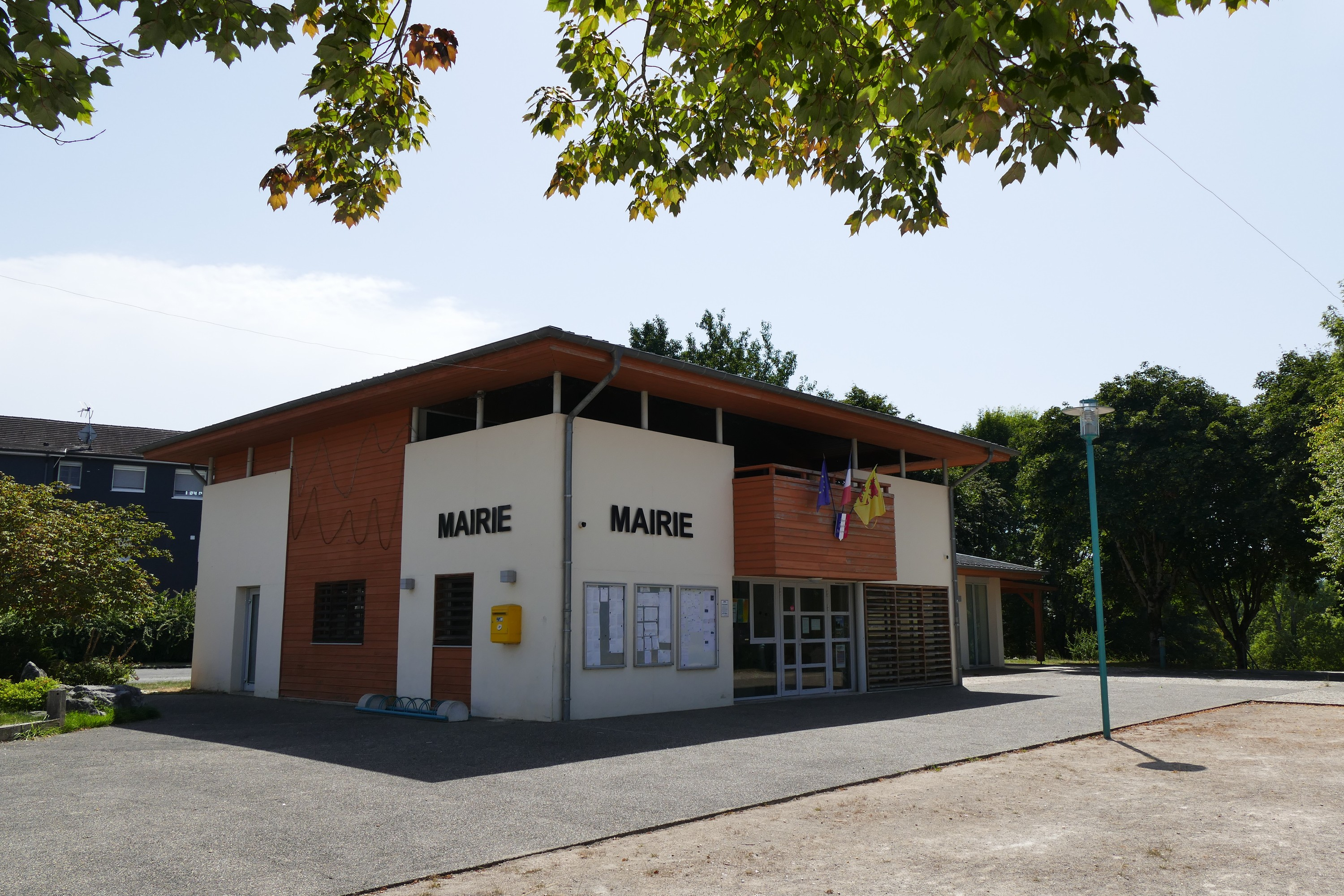
- Baudreix Town hall
- Location of Baudreix
- Location within France Location within Nouvelle-Aquitaine
- Coordinates: 43°12′24″N 0°15′23″W
- Country: France
- Region: Nouvelle-Aquitaine
- Department: Pyrénées-Atlantiques
- Arrondissement: Pau
- Canton: Vallées de l'Ousse et du Lagoin

Government
  - Mayor (2020–2026): Francis Escalé
- Area^{1}: 2.00 km^{2} (0.77 sq mi)
- Elevation: 249 m (817 ft)
- Highest elevation: 253 m (830 ft)
- Lowest elevation: 230 m (750 ft)
- Population (2023): 591
  - Density: 296/km^{2} (765/sq mi)
- Time zone: UTC+01:00 (CET)
  - Summer (DST): UTC+02:00 (CEST)
- INSEE/Postal code: 64101 /64800
- ^{1} French Land Register data, which excludes lakes, ponds, glaciers > 1 km^{2} (0.386 sq mi or 247 acres) and river estuaries.

Baudreix (French pronunciation: [bodʁɛks]; Occitan: Baudreish) is a commune of the Pyrénées-Atlantiques department in southwestern France.

It is located about 14 km southeast of Pau, on the Gave de Pau river.

== See also ==
- Communes of the Pyrénées-Atlantiques department
