= Beuste =

- Commune
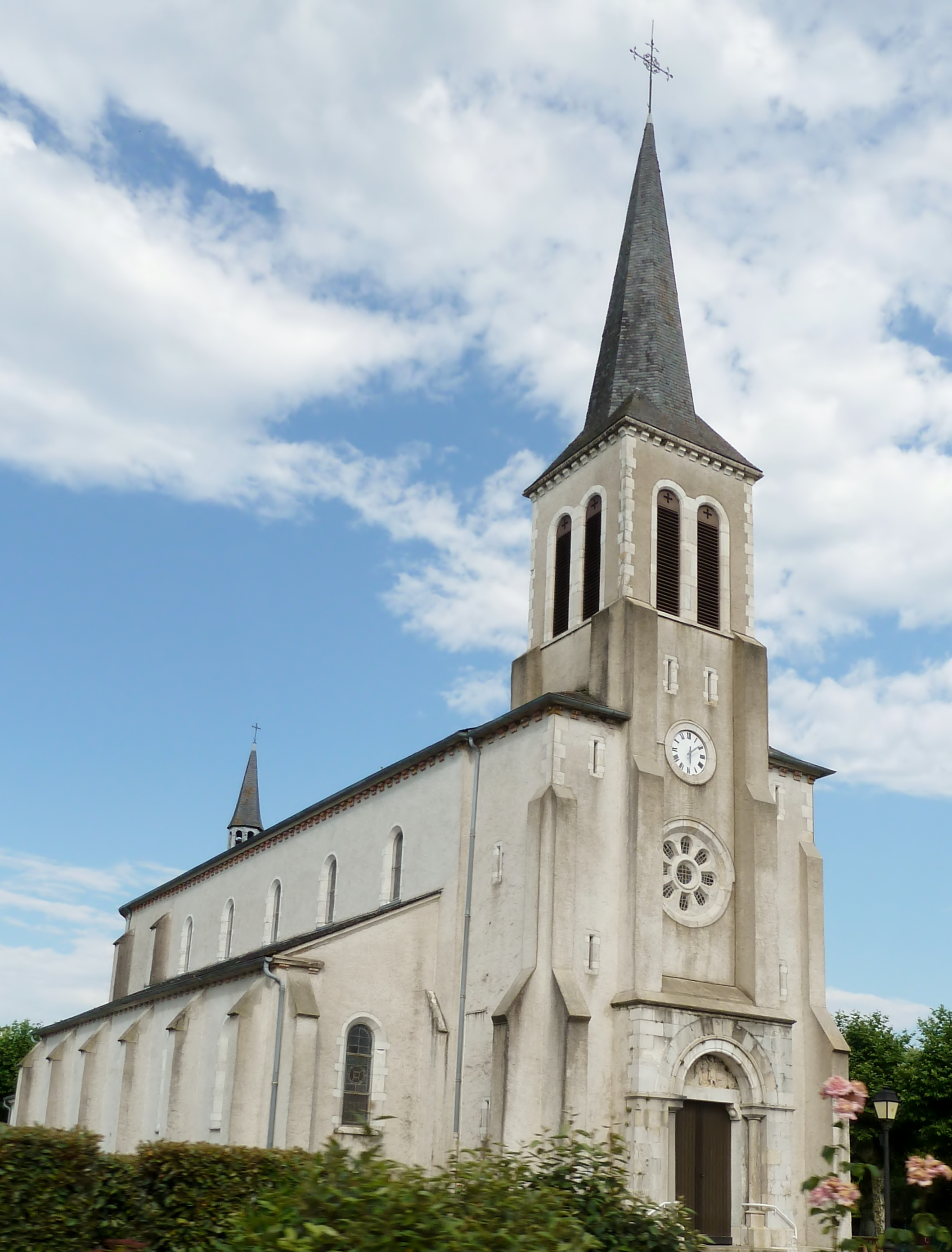
- The church of Saint-Jean-Baptiste, in Beuste
- Location of Beuste
- Location within France Location within Nouvelle-Aquitaine
- Coordinates: 43°13′08″N 0°13′48″W
- Country: France
- Region: Nouvelle-Aquitaine
- Department: Pyrénées-Atlantiques
- Arrondissement: Pau
- Canton: Vallées de l'Ousse et du Lagoin
- Intercommunality: Pays de Nay

Government
  - Mayor (2020–2026): Serge Calas
- Area^{1}: 5.84 km^{2} (2.25 sq mi)
- Elevation: 244 m (801 ft)
- Highest elevation: 418 m (1,371 ft)
- Lowest elevation: 233 m (764 ft)
- Population (2023): 698
  - Density: 120/km^{2} (310/sq mi)
- Time zone: UTC+01:00 (CET)
  - Summer (DST): UTC+02:00 (CEST)
- INSEE/Postal code: 64119 /64800
- ^{1} French Land Register data, which excludes lakes, ponds, glaciers > 1 km^{2} (0.386 sq mi or 247 acres) and river estuaries.

Beuste (French pronunciation: [bøst]) is a commune of the Pyrénées-Atlantiques department in southwestern France.

== See also ==
- Communes of the Pyrénées-Atlantiques department
