= Lucgarier =

- Commune
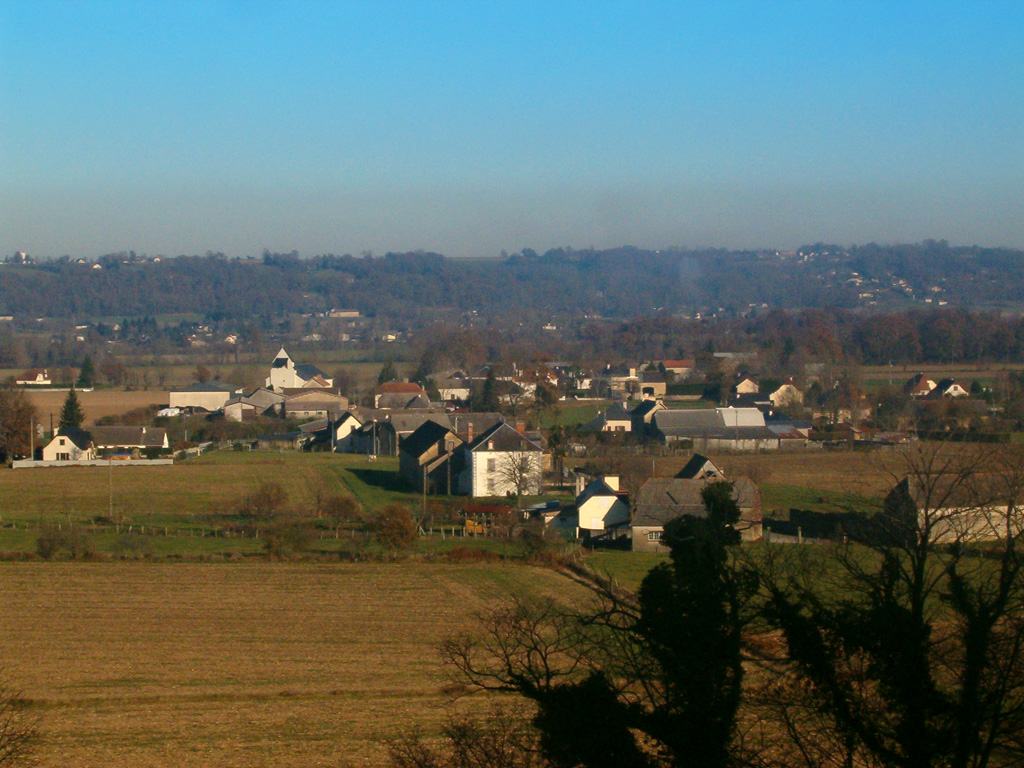
- A general view of Lucgarier
- Location of Lucgarier
- Location within France Location within Nouvelle-Aquitaine
- Coordinates: 43°14′14″N 0°11′26″W
- Country: France
- Region: Nouvelle-Aquitaine
- Department: Pyrénées-Atlantiques
- Arrondissement: Pau
- Canton: Vallées de l'Ousse et du Lagoin
- Intercommunality: Nord Est Béarn

Government
  - Mayor (2023–2026): Nathalie Soubirou
- Area^{1}: 5.67 km^{2} (2.19 sq mi)
- Elevation: 319 m (1,047 ft)
- Highest elevation: 418 m (1,371 ft)
- Lowest elevation: 289 m (948 ft)
- Population (2023): 273
  - Density: 48.1/km^{2} (125/sq mi)
- Time zone: UTC+01:00 (CET)
  - Summer (DST): UTC+02:00 (CEST)
- INSEE/Postal code: 64358 /64420
- ^{1} French Land Register data, which excludes lakes, ponds, glaciers > 1 km^{2} (0.386 sq mi or 247 acres) and river estuaries.

Lucgarier (French pronunciation: [lyɡaʁje]; Occitan: Lucgarrièr) is a commune in the Pyrénées-Atlantiques department in south-western France.

== See also ==
- Communes of the Pyrénées-Atlantiques department
