= Nousty =

- Commune
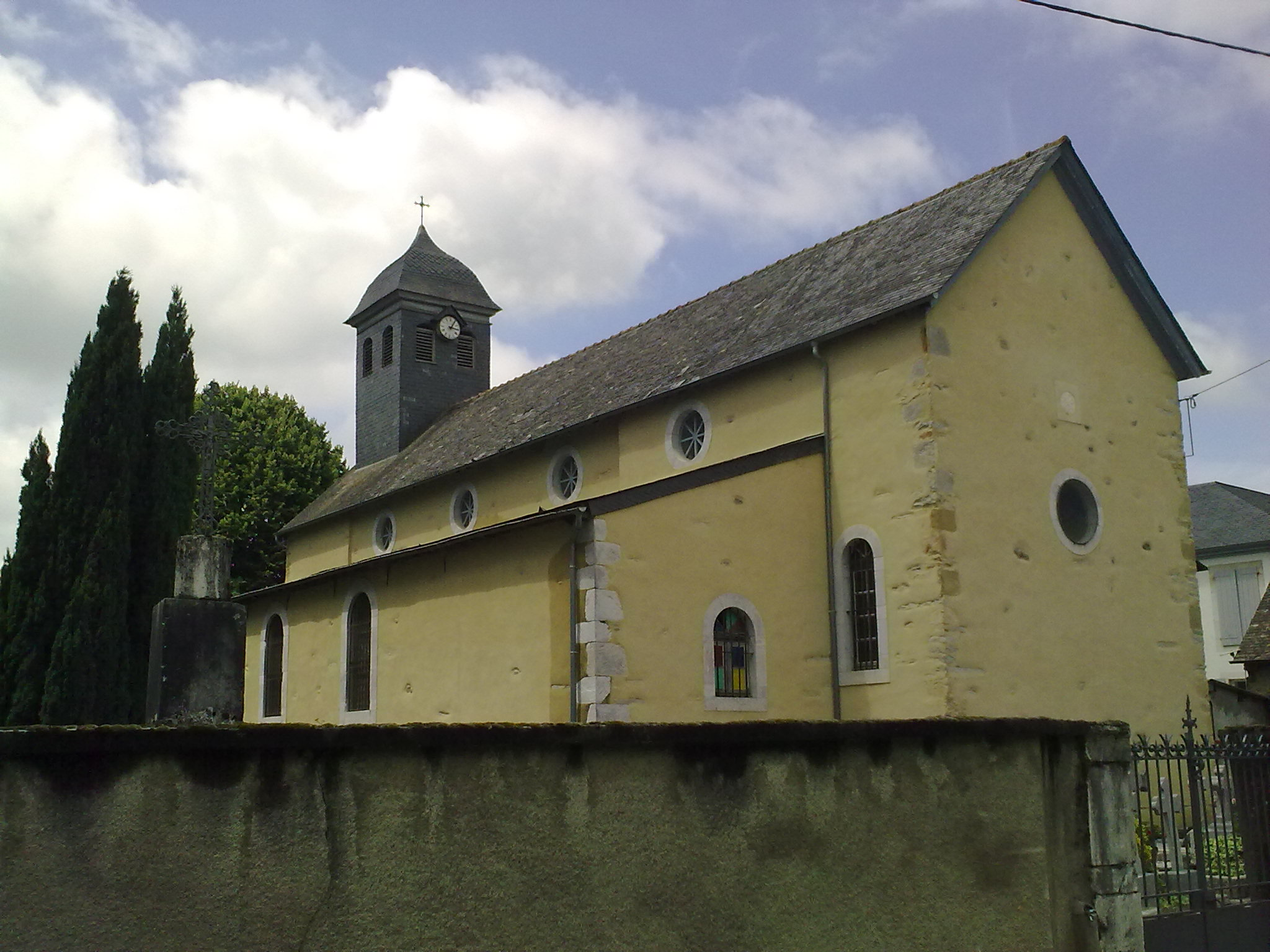
- Church
- Location of Nousty
- Location within France Location within Nouvelle-Aquitaine
- Coordinates: 43°16′05″N 0°12′35″W
- Country: France
- Region: Nouvelle-Aquitaine
- Department: Pyrénées-Atlantiques
- Arrondissement: Pau
- Canton: Vallées de l'Ousse et du Lagoin
- Intercommunality: Nord Est Béarn

Government
  - Mayor (2020–2026): Claude Borde-Baylacq
- Area^{1}: 9.70 km^{2} (3.75 sq mi)
- Elevation: 300 m (980 ft)
- Highest elevation: 412 m (1,352 ft)
- Lowest elevation: 255 m (837 ft)
- Population (2023): 1,572
  - Density: 162/km^{2} (420/sq mi)
- Time zone: UTC+01:00 (CET)
  - Summer (DST): UTC+02:00 (CEST)
- INSEE/Postal code: 64419 /64420
- ^{1} French Land Register data, which excludes lakes, ponds, glaciers > 1 km^{2} (0.386 sq mi or 247 acres) and river estuaries.

Nousty (French pronunciation: [nusti]; Occitan: Nostin) is a commune in the Pyrénées-Atlantiques department in south-western France.

The inhabitants of the town of Nousty are called Noustysiens, Noustysiennes in French.

== See also ==
- Communes of the Pyrénées-Atlantiques department
