= Bordères =

- Commune
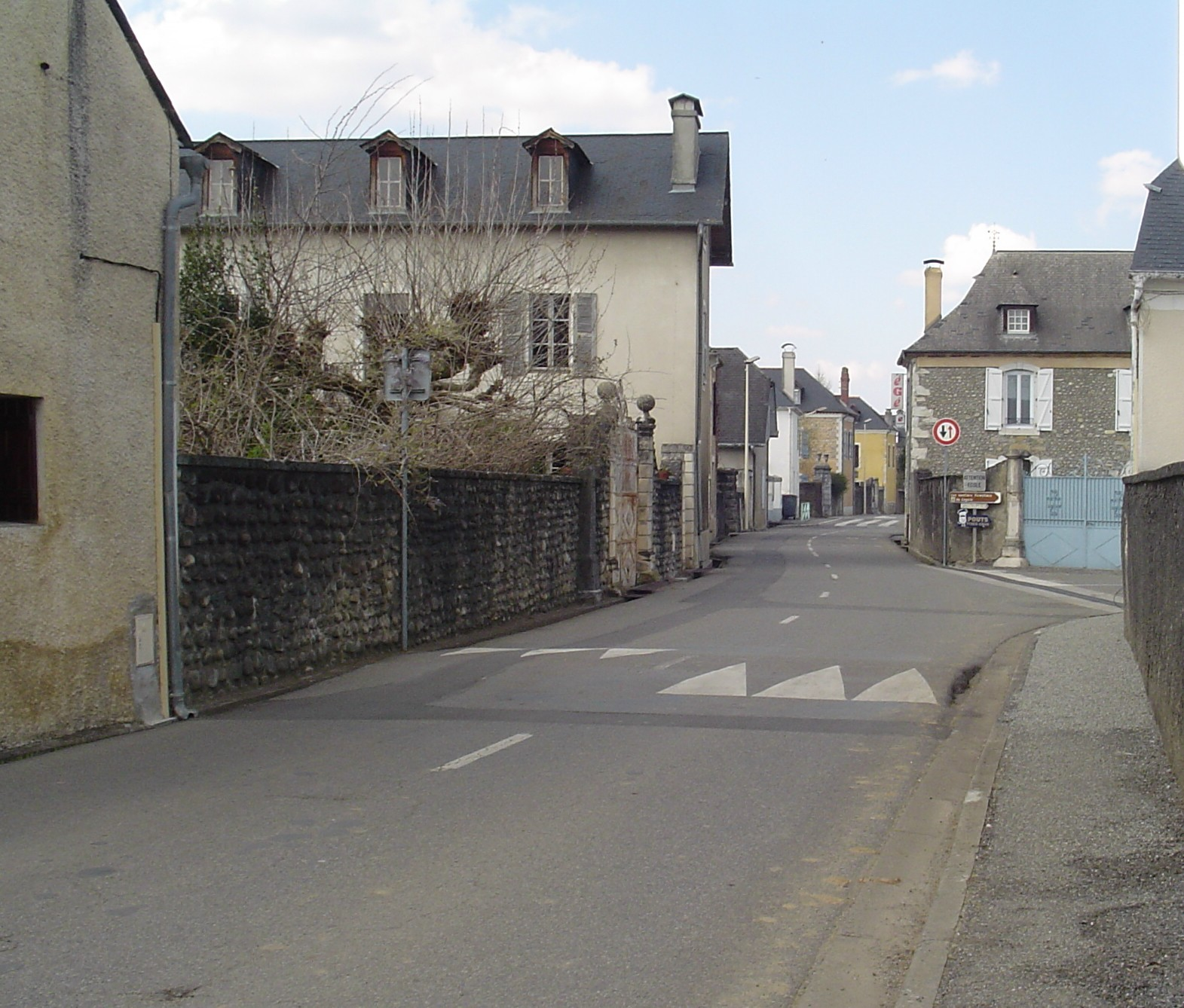
- A street in the village
- Location of Bordères
- Location within France Location within Nouvelle-Aquitaine
- Coordinates: 43°12′16″N 0°13′12″W
- Country: France
- Region: Nouvelle-Aquitaine
- Department: Pyrénées-Atlantiques
- Arrondissement: Pau
- Canton: Vallées de l'Ousse et du Lagoin

Government
  - Mayor (2020–2026): Michel Minvielle
- Area^{1}: 4.58 km^{2} (1.77 sq mi)
- Elevation: 249 m (817 ft)
- Highest elevation: 420 m (1,380 ft)
- Lowest elevation: 247 m (810 ft)
- Population (2023): 694
  - Density: 152/km^{2} (392/sq mi)
- Time zone: UTC+01:00 (CET)
  - Summer (DST): UTC+02:00 (CEST)
- INSEE/Postal code: 64137 /64800
- ^{1} French Land Register data, which excludes lakes, ponds, glaciers > 1 km^{2} (0.386 sq mi or 247 acres) and river estuaries.

Bordères (French pronunciation: [bɔʁdɛʁ]; Occitan: Bordèras) is a commune in the Pyrénées-Atlantiques department, in the administrative region of Nouvelle-Aquitaine, southwestern France.

== Personalities ==
It is the birthplace of French prime minister François Bayrou.

== See also ==
- Communes of the Pyrénées-Atlantiques department
