= Béarn AOC =

Béarn (French pronunciation: [beaʁn]) is an Appellation d'Origine Contrôlée (AOC) for wine in South West France. It is located in the area of intersection of three French departments: Pyrénées-Atlantiques, Hautes-Pyrénées and Gers; and two regions: Aquitaine and Midi-Pyrénées. Some vineyards in the area of the Jurançon AOC can also produce red Béarn wine, and some in the area of the Madiran AOC may produce a rosé Béarn. Wines made in the village of Bellocq also carry the appellation Béarn-Bellocq.

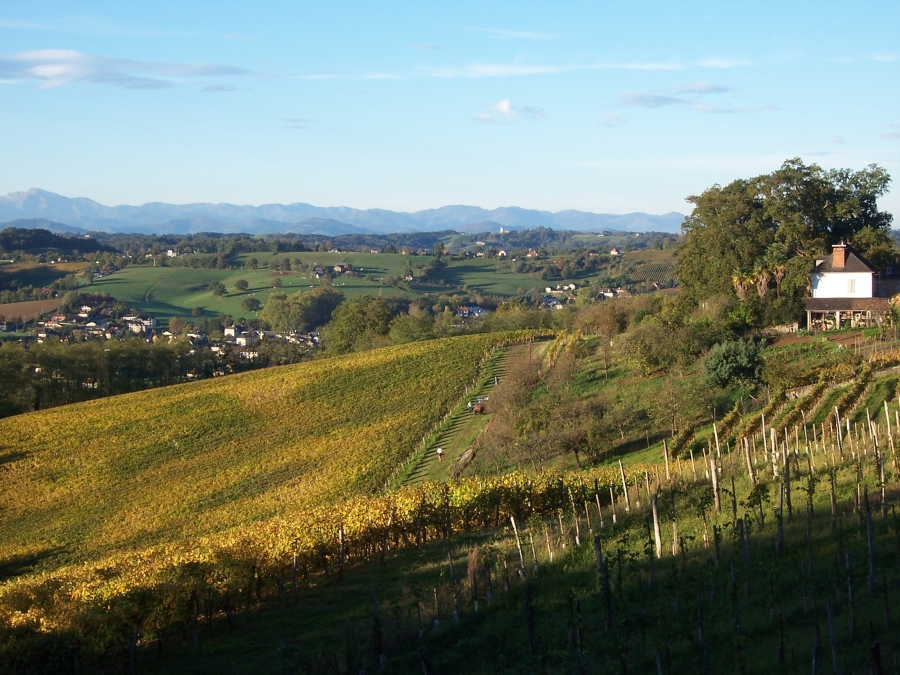

Appellation: Béarn and Béarn-bellocq
Classification: AOC
Year of Classification: 1975 for Béarn AOC
1991 for Béarn-Bellocq AOC
Country: France

Location: South West
Department: Béarn
Climate: Oceanic
Soil: Gravelly-Clayey, Sandy-Clayey, Sandstone-Clayey
Plantation Area: 259 ha
Wineries: 2 Cooperatives and 28 Independent Winemakers
Grape Varieties: Red
Cabernet Franc, Cabernet Sauvignon and Tannat
White
Raffiat de Moncade, Petit Manseng and Gros Manseng.
Wines: Red, Rosé and White
Volume of Production: 13470 hl
Yield: 50 hl/ha

== History ==
=== Pre-history and antiquity ===
During the Roman colonisation, a vineyard was planted on the hillsides between Salies-de-Béarn and Bellocq village.

=== The Middle Ages ===
Gaston VII de Montcada, Viscount of Béarn, built a fortress in Bellocq. This allowed for the construction of a bastide. The new inhabitants of the bastide contributed to the development of the vineyard. Crossing the vineyard on the Way of St. James, pilgrims making their way to Galicia or returning from their pilgrimage popularised Béarn wine beyond regional borders.

=== Renaissance ===
Jeanne d'Albret, mother of Henry IV of France, who was here on her land, particularly appreciated Béarn wine.

=== The modern period ===
In the 17th century, Béarnais protestants who exiled to Holland and England directed their wine trade to Northern Europe.

=== Recent history ===
The appellation gained VDQS status in 1951, and then AOC in 1975. The Béarn-Bellocq AOC was created in 1991.

== Etymology ==
The Béarn AOC takes its name from the former province Béarn, where it is produced. Béarn itself is named after the people of the Bénéharnais, who occupied the area in Antiquity.

== Geography ==
The Béarn wine region is scattered over different areas. Béarn wine can be made in three geographically distinct zones. The appellation area defined for the Madiran AOC can yield Madiran wine, red wine, white Pacherenc du Vic-Bilh, and rosé Béarn. The appellation area defined for the Jurançon AOC can yield white Jurançon, and red and white Béarn. The third area was defined especially for the Béarn AOC, even including a precise geographic area for Béarn-Bellocq. The latter owes its name to Bellocq village, the nerve centre of the eponymous cooperative winery.

=== Orography ===
This wine region occupies the gave terraces and its Pre-Pyrenean hills, in the Jurançon and Madiran appellation areas.

=== Geology ===
The land is essentially composed of sandy-clay soils that date back to the last Ice Age, which lie on a clay and gravel substrate dating back to the Pliocene Epoch. The land in Béarn-Bellocq consists of the Gave de Pau terraces and gravelly hills. This soil is highly permeable, which allows excess water to drain, but it is limited by its mediocre fertility. The land in Jurançon consists of puddingstones, flysch and gravelly water tables, all formed by the debris of fallen rocks from the Pyrenees, carried there by the Gave de Pau. The land in Madiran consists of limestone bank molasse, nappes of pebbles, and boulbènes. These are fairly deteriorated, sedimentary rocks left from the rising Pyrenees.

=== Climate ===
Temperate Oceanic climate with warm, sunny autumns ("Indian Summers"). The proximity of the Pyrenees has an influence on the local climate; the mountains block masses of rain clouds, resulting in foehn winds). Rainfall varies between 1300mm in Salies-de-Béarn to 1000mm in Madiran. This amount of rainfall justifies the choice of high-draining soils.

== Wine region ==
=== Overview ===
Béarn's appellation areas consist of Béarn-Bellocq, and wines that cannot be labelled as Jurançon or Madiran. They cover 259 ha stretching over 74 communes of the Pyrénées-Atlantiques, 6 the Hautes-Pyrénées and 3 of the Gers.

- Pyrénées-Atlantiques: Abos, Arbus, Arricau-Bordes, Arrosès, Artiguelouve, Aubertin, Aubous, Aurions-Idernes, Aydie, Baigts-de-Béarn, Bellocq, Bérenx, Bétracq, Bosdarros, Burosse-Mendousse, Cadillon, Cardesse, Carresse, Castagnède, Castetpugon, Castillon (Canton of Lembeye), Conchez-de-Béarn, Corbère-Abères, Crouseilles, Cuqueron, Diusse, Escurès, Estialescq, Gan, Gayon, Gelos, Haut-de-Bosdarros, L'Hôpital-d'Orion, Jurançon, Lacommande, Lagor, Lahontan, Lahourcade, Laroin, Lasserre, Lasseube, Lasseubetat, Lembeye, Lespielle-Germenaud-Lannegrasse, Lucq-de-Béarn, Mascaraàs-Haron, Mazères-Lezons, Moncaup, Moncla, Monein, Monpezat, Mont-Disse, Mourenx, Narcastet, Ogenne-Camptort, Oraàs, Orthez, Parbayse, Portet, Puyoô, Ramous, Rontignon, Saint-Faust, Saint-Jean-Poudge, Sainte-Suzanne, Salies-de-Béarn, Salles-Mongiscard, Sauvelade, Séméacq-Blachon, Tadousse-Ussau, Taron-Sadirac-Viellenave, Uzos, Vialer, Vielleségure
- Hautes-Pyrénées Castelnau-Rivière-Basse, Hagedet, Lascazères, Madiran, Saint-Lanne et Soublecause.
- Gers Cannet, Maumusson-Laguian, Viella.

Since 1991, the Béarn-Bellocq AOC has been given to wines grown in Bellocq, Lahontan, Orthez and Salies-de-Béarn.

=== Grape varieties ===
Six red varieties are used: Cabernet Franc N, Cabernet Sauvignon, Tannat, Fer, Manseng Noir and Courbu Noir. According to Guy Lavignac this region had its own grape varieties for centuries: Bouchy, Fer, Manseng Noir, Courbu and probably others not included in its appellation. In the 18th century, the Tannat variety was introduced. It was allegedly a hybrid of Côt and Pyrenean grapes. While the region's vineyards were being restored after a Phylloxera breakout, Cabernet Sauvignon was imported from Bordeaux. The Courbu and Manseng Noir grape varieties are today nothing more than relics of the past. Even so, they continue to be grown in a grape conservation. The conservation grows seven white grape varieties: Raffiat de Moncade, Petit Manseng, Gros Manseng, Pinenc, Sauvignon, Camaralet de Lasseube and Lauzet. These varieties are again very old, and differ greatly from one another. Raffiat de Moncade is rarely grown outside of Bellocq, where it is grown only in private collections. The Petit and Gros Manseng varieties were rediscovered in the 1960s and 1970s, and today are still planted a lot, all across Gascogne. The Pinenc, Lauzet and Camaralet varieties from the Lasseube commune are grown in very small quantities (a combined 0.26 ha in 2000), having been replaced by Sauvignon Blanc.

=== Cultural methods ===
Vines are grown en hautain, a regional method in which they are grown around trees so that fruit is produced high up. Only taille longue trees are allowed for this process.

=== Terroir and wines ===
Wines from all three zones can use the Béarn appellation; Jurançon for its red wines, Madiran for its rosés, and Bellocq for any wine (though wines of the latter are only entitled to use it under the Béarn-Bellocq appellation). Reds and rosés account for the majority of Béarn's production. They are clean and light in taste, and should ideally be drunk within a year of their production. Dry whites are known under the name "Rousselet de Béarn".

=== Cultivation structure ===
Two cooperatives and twenty-eight independent wineries are responsible for the area's wine production.

=== Wine type and gastronomy ===
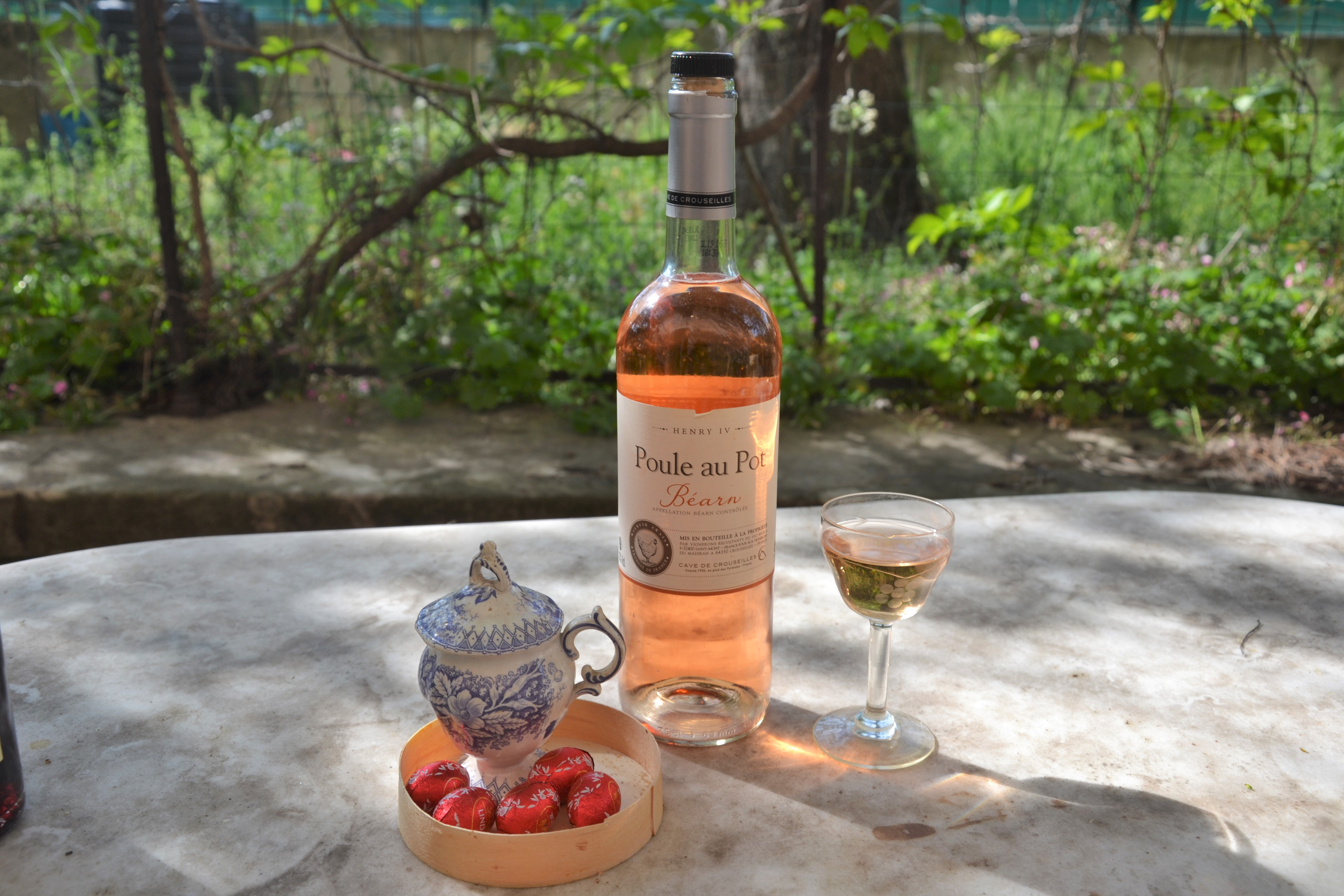
Béarn AOC – Poule au Pot rosé

Red Béarn wines clear the nose with notes of dark berry fruits (blueberry, cherry and blackcurrant). They should be drunk between two and five years after bottling. These reds are traditionally served with grilled or stewed meat, poultry, duck, game, and croûte fleurie cheeses (cheeses with a white or golden mould). Béarn rosés have an aroma of small red fruits and should be drunk young. They are traditionally served with charcuterie, mixed salads and grills. Moelleux and dry whites production is less mainstream. The Moelleux complements foie gras, herby cream cheeses and desserts. The dry whites can be drunk as an aperitif or with hors d'oeuvres, fish, and shellfish, and should be served at 8–10 °C.

=== Marketing ===
The AOC produces 52.8 hl of white wine, 7343.86 hl of red wine and 6072.68 hl of rosé.

== See also ==
- Jurançon AOC
- Madiran (AOC)

== Bibliography ==
- Benoît France (2002). Grand Atlas des Vignobles de France. Paris: Édition Solar. ISBN 2-263-03242-8.
- Michel Mastrojanni (1982). Le grand Livre des vins de France. Paris: Édition Solar. ISBN 2-263-00592-7.
- Paul Strang (1997). Vins du Sud-Ouest. Rodez: Édition du Rouergue. ISBN 2-84156-054-6.
- Guy Lavignac (2001). Cépages du sud-ouest, 2000 ans d'histoire. Éditions du Rouergue. ISBN 2-84156-289-1.
