= Arricau-Bordes =

- Commune
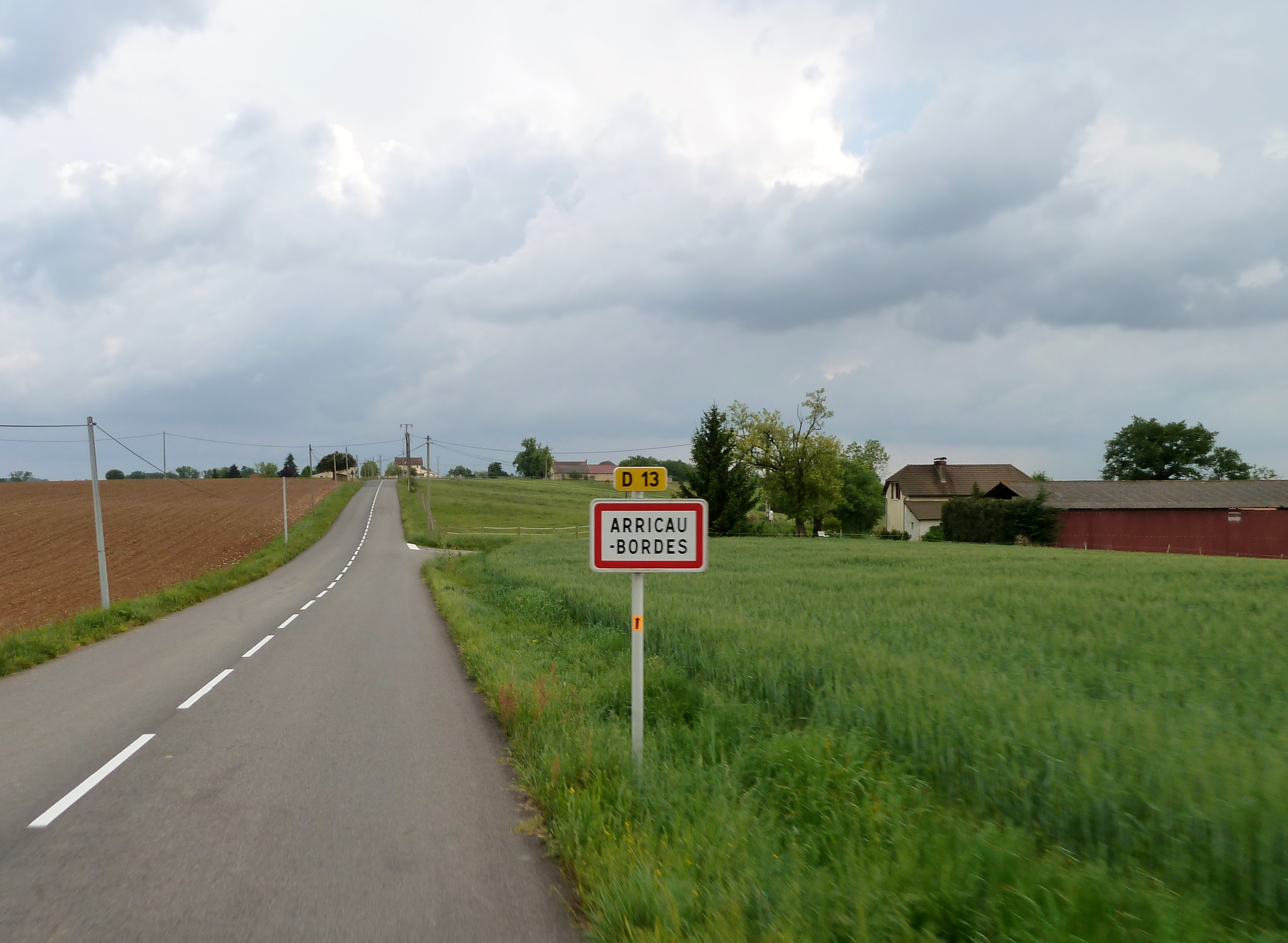
- The road into Arricau-Bordes
- Location of Arricau-Bordes
- Location within France Location within Nouvelle-Aquitaine
- Coordinates: 43°29′39″N 0°08′01″W
- Country: France
- Region: Nouvelle-Aquitaine
- Department: Pyrénées-Atlantiques
- Arrondissement: Pau
- Canton: Terres des Luys et Coteaux du Vic-Bilh
- Intercommunality: Nord-Est Béarn

Government
  - Mayor (2020–2026): Marie-Odile Rigaud
- Area^{1}: 8.10 km^{2} (3.13 sq mi)
- Elevation: 284 m (932 ft)
- Highest elevation: 299 m (981 ft)
- Lowest elevation: 140 m (460 ft)
- Population (2023): 105
  - Density: 13.0/km^{2} (33.6/sq mi)
- Time zone: UTC+01:00 (CET)
  - Summer (DST): UTC+02:00 (CEST)
- INSEE/Postal code: 64052 /64350
- ^{1} French Land Register data, which excludes lakes, ponds, glaciers > 1 km^{2} (0.386 sq mi or 247 acres) and river estuaries.

Arricau-Bordes (French pronunciation: [aʁiko bɔʁd]; Occitan: Arricau e Bòrdas) is a commune in the Pyrénées-Atlantiques department in the Nouvelle-Aquitaine region of south-western France.

== Geography ==
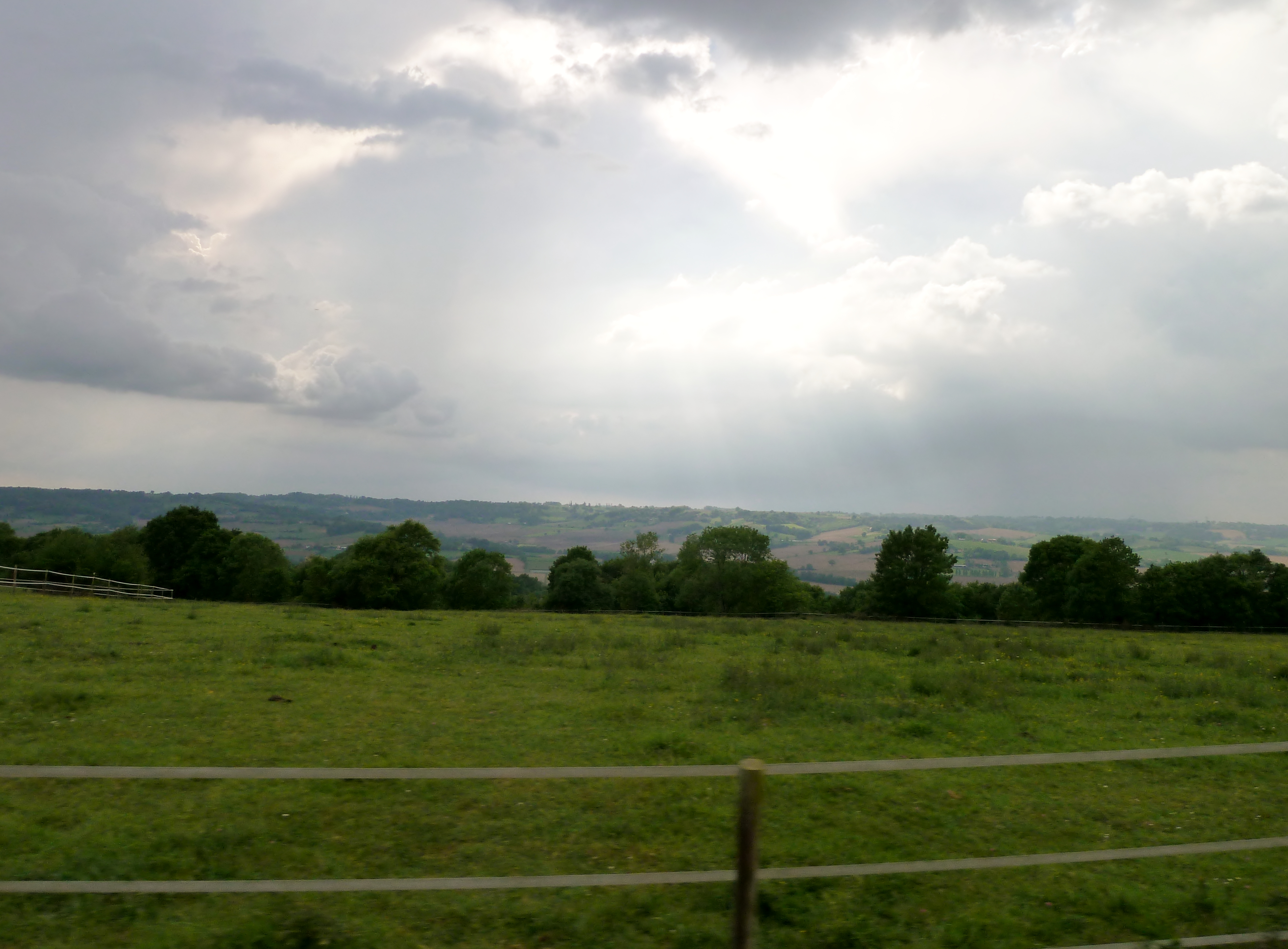
View of Arricau-Bordes

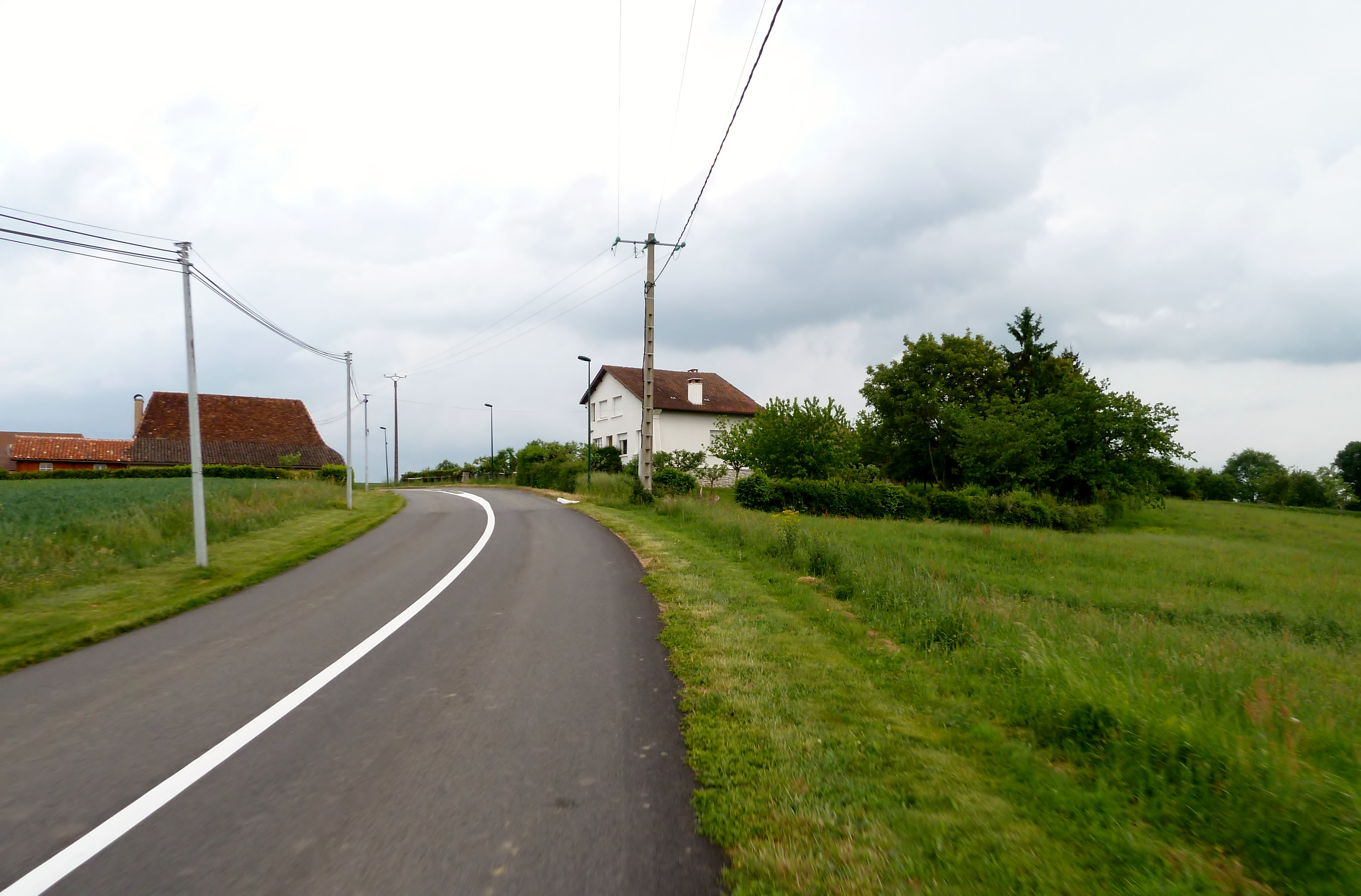
Some houses in the village

Arricau-Bordes is located some 12 km north-west of Maubourguet and some 40 km north-east of Pau. Access to the commune is by the D13 road from Cadillon in the north passing through the heart of the commune and through the village then continuing south to Lembeye. The D298 from Aurions-Idernes forms the entire eastern border of the commune as it goes south to join the D13 north of Lembaye. The D228 comes from Séméacq-Blachon in the east and passes through the south of the commune west to Gayon. About 60% of the commune is forested mostly in a north–south belt through the centre with the rest of the commune farmland.

The Lisau river flows through the heart of the commune from the Lac de Castillon just over the southern border to the Lac de Cadillon just over the northern border of the commune.

=== Places and Hamlets ===
- Arricau
- Les Balances
- Barbé
- Bordes
- Le Calvaire
- Carboué
- Castagnat
- Cazenave
- Cerisère
- Domengé
- Hauzoué
- Lahitole
- Laramoune
- Lecher
- Marchand
- Mereït
- Pédéjouan
- Péhat
- La Riberette
- Séglères
- Tisné
- Val Pré

== Toponymy ==
The commune name in béarnais is Arricau-Bordas.

According to Michel Grosclaude the name Arricau was formed from two Gascon terms: arric, meaning "ravine" or "Thalweg", and cau, meaning "sunken".

Bordes comes from the Occitan borda meaning "house" or "Farm".

The following table details the origins of the commune name and other names in the commune.

Name	Spelling	Date	Source	Page	Origin	Description
Arricau	Arricau	12th century	Raymond	12	Marca	Village
	Arricau	1385	Raymond	12	Census	
	Ricau	14th century	Raymond	12	Census	
	Arricau-Viele	1538	Raymond	12	Reformation	
Bordes	Bordas	11th century	Raymond	33	Lescar	Village
	Bordes en Vic-Bilh	1673	Raymond	33	Reformation	
Domengé	L'ostau de Domenger	1385	Raymond	56	Census	Farm
Lahitole	La Fitola	1538	Raymond	89	Reformation	Hamlet
	Lahitolle	1673	Raymond	89	Reformation	
	Lafitole	1863	Raymond	89		
	La Fitole	1863	Raymond	89		
Nouguès	Noguer	1385	Raymond	123	Census	Farm
Saint-Martin	Saint-Martin	1863	Raymond	150		Hamlet

Sources:

- Raymond: Topographic Dictionary of the Department of Basses-Pyrenees, 1863, on the page numbers indicated in the table. (in French)

Origins:

- Marca: Pierre de Marca, History of Béarn.
- Census: Census of Béarn
- Reformation: Reformation of Béarn
- Lescar: Cartulary of Lescar

== History ==
Paul Raymond noted that, in 1385, Arricau and Bordes depended on the bailiwick of Lembeye and had respectively 18 and 12 fires. Arricau then had two parishes: Saint-Martin and Saint-Jacques. The fief of Bordes depended on the Viscounts of Béarn.

Arricau and Bordes were merged between 1861 and 1866.

== Administration ==
List of Successive Mayors

From	To	Name
1995	2008	Jean-Paul Cassou
2008	2014	Frédéric Cerisère
2014	2026	Marie-Odile Rigaud

=== Inter-communality ===
The commune is part of four inter-communal structures:

- the Communauté de communes du Nord-Est Béarn;
- the AEP association of Pays de Lembeye;
- the Energy association of Pyrénées-Atlantiques;
- the irrigation association of the Lees valley;

== Demography ==
The population data given in the table and graph below for 1861 and earlier refer to the former commune of Arricau.

Historical population

Year	Pop.	±% p.a.
1793	250	—
1821	263	+0.18%
1841	290	+0.49%
1861	215	−1.49%
1866	326	+8.68%
1881	344	+0.36%
1901	267	−1.26%
1926	178	−1.61%
1946	150	−0.85%
1962	139	−0.47%

Year	Pop.	±% p.a.
1968	124	−1.89%
1975	126	+0.23%
1982	105	−2.57%
1990	102	−0.36%
1999	105	+0.32%
2007	105	+0.00%
2012	107	+0.38%
2017	108	+0.19%
2023	105	−0.47%

Source: EHESS and INSEE

== Economy ==
The commune is part of the Appellation d'origine contrôlée (AOC) zones of Madiran, Pacherenc-du-vic-bilh, and Béarn.

== Culture and Heritage ==
=== Civil heritage ===
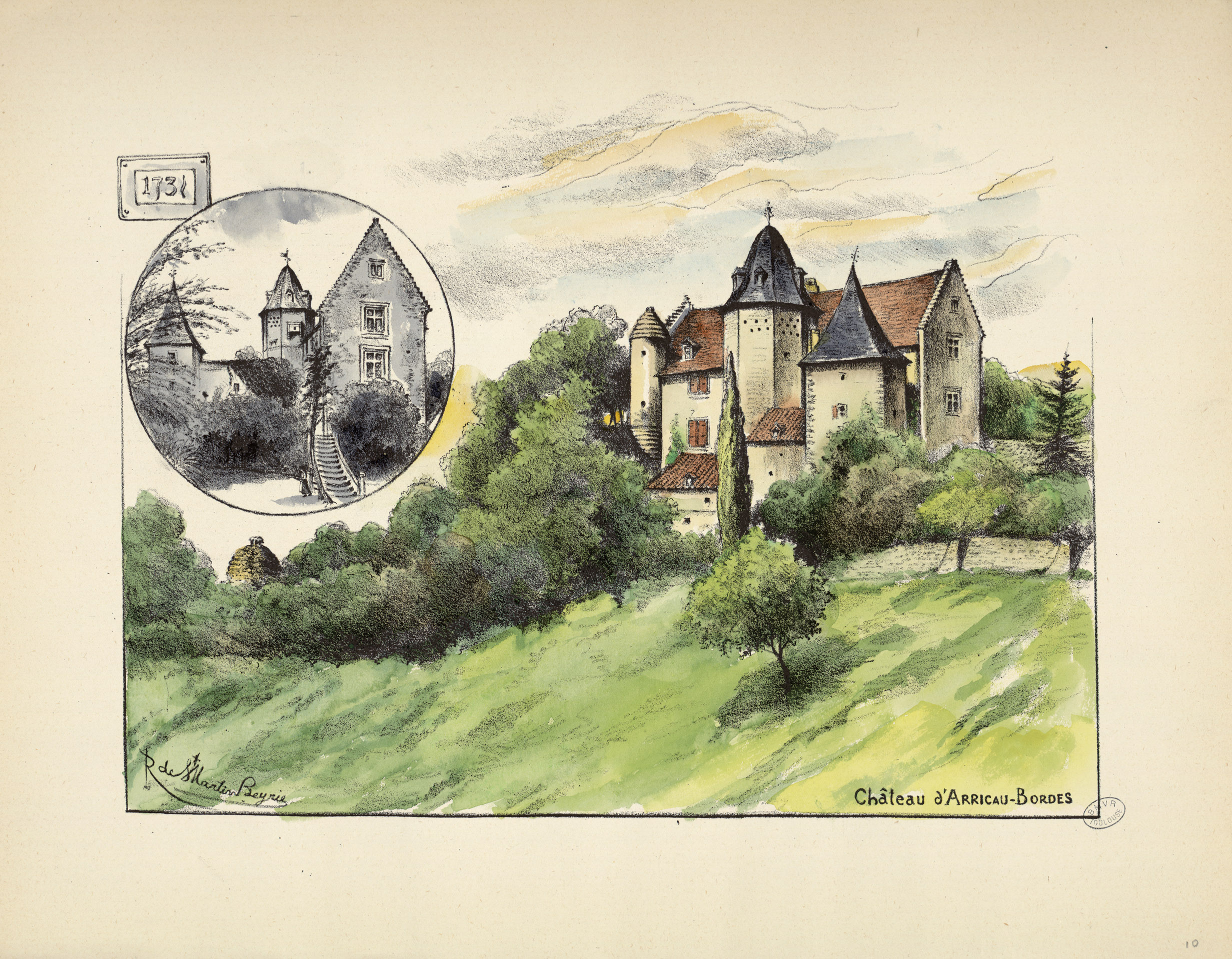
Chateau of Arricau in 1926

The commune has many sites that are registered as historical monuments:

- The Chateau of Arricau (1572) The Chateau contains several items that are registered as historical objects:
  - An Iron Host (17th century)
  - A Stoup (18th century)
  - An Hilarri (16th century)
- The Chateau of Bordes at Bordes (18th century)
- A House at Lahitole (1777)
- Houses and Farms Of the 40 buildings studied, 27 dated from before 1871.

=== Religious heritage ===
The commune has two churches that are registered as historical monuments:

- The Parish Church of Saint-Jacques at Arricau (1570) was mentioned in 1570 but was destroyed two centuries later.
- The Parish Church of Saint John the Baptist at Bordes (11th century) The Church contains several items that are registered as historical objects:
  - Chasuble (19th century)
  - 2 Processional Lanterns (19th century)
  - A Processional Cross (17th century)
  - A Celebrant's Chair (18th century)
  - An Altar, Altar step, and Tabernacle (18th century)

== See also ==
- Communes of the Pyrénées-Atlantiques department
