= Arrosès =

- Commune
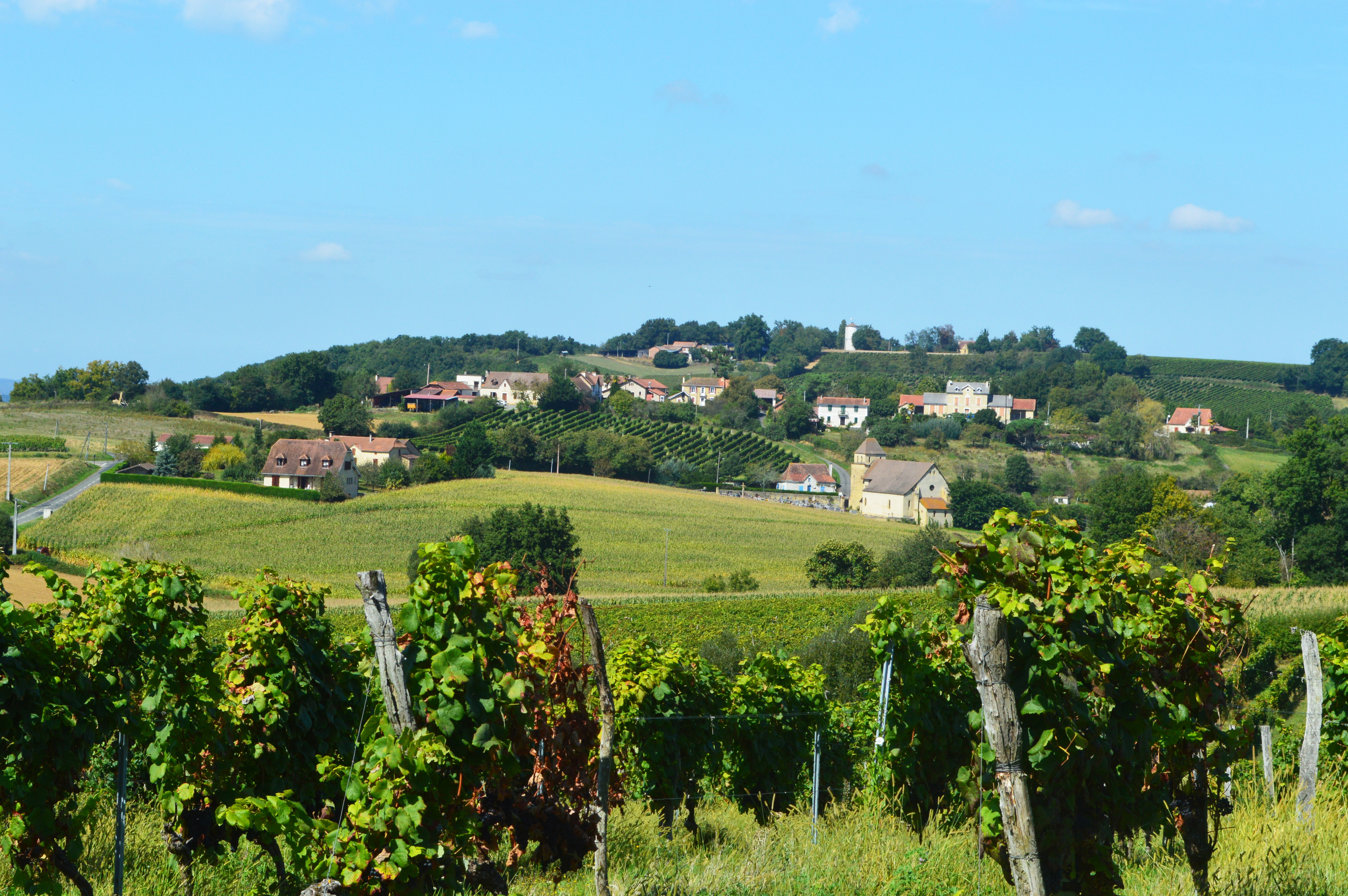
- A general view of Arrosès
- Location of Arrosès
- Location within France Location within Nouvelle-Aquitaine
- Coordinates: 43°32′32″N 0°06′37″W
- Country: France
- Region: Nouvelle-Aquitaine
- Department: Pyrénées-Atlantiques
- Arrondissement: Pau
- Canton: Terres des Luys et Coteaux du Vic-Bilh
- Intercommunality: Nord-Est Béarn

Government
  - Mayor (2020–2026): Michel Cantounet
- Area^{1}: 9.64 km^{2} (3.72 sq mi)
- Elevation: 226 m (741 ft)
- Highest elevation: 265 m (869 ft)
- Lowest elevation: 129 m (423 ft)
- Population (2023): 136
  - Density: 14.1/km^{2} (36.5/sq mi)
- Time zone: UTC+01:00 (CET)
  - Summer (DST): UTC+02:00 (CEST)
- INSEE/Postal code: 64056 /64350
- ^{1} French Land Register data, which excludes lakes, ponds, glaciers > 1 km^{2} (0.386 sq mi or 247 acres) and river estuaries.

Arrosès (French pronunciation: [aʁozɛs]; Occitan: Arrosés) is a commune in the Pyrénées-Atlantiques department in the Nouvelle-Aquitaine region of south-western France.

== Geography ==
Arrosès is located some 50 km south-east of Hagetmau and some 5 km west of Madiran with the eastern border of the commune being the border between Pyrénées-Atlantiques and Hautes-Pyrénées departments. Access to the commune is by the D219 road from Aurions-Idernes in the west passing through the commune north of the village then continuing east to Madiran as the D66. The D292 comes from Aubous in the north passing through the commune and the village and continuing south to join the D139 south of Crouseilles. The commune is mostly farmland with patches of forest scattered throughout.

The commune is located in the Drainage basin of the Adour with several streams rising in the commune and flowing east to join the Saget which flows north to join the Adour near Saint-Mont and forming most of the eastern border of the commune. The Larcis forms most of the western border of the commune as it flows north to join the Lees.

=== Places and Hamlets ===
- Auvian
- Baradat
- Barbau
- Baylou
- Bigarat
- Bouézou
- Bousigué
- Bouziquet
- Cantounet
- Couet
- Crecq
- Ducos
- Duliès
- Flandres
- Grange
- Haget
- Hourat
- Jouet
- Lasgrabes
- Laudique
- Lavielle
- Mombet
- Mondain
- La Mothe
- Paris
- Peyret
- Raguet
- Regard
- Ribès
- Sassié
- Tapounet
- Tillet

== Toponymy ==
The commune name in béarnais is Arrosés.

Michel Grosclaude proposed as its etymology the anthroponym Arrosés which was very common in the Pyrenees and the Iberian Peninsula and well attested in the Middle Ages.

The following table details the origins of the commune name and other names in the commune.

| Name | Spelling | Date | Source | Page | Origin | Description |
|---|---|---|---|---|---|---|
| Arrosès | Aroses | 1385 | Raymond | 13 | Census | Village |
| | Arozee | 14th century | Raymond | 13 | Census | |
| | Arosser | 14th century | Raymond | 13 | Census | |
| | Arozer | 14th century | Raymond | 13 | Census | |
| | Arroser | 1402 | Raymond | 13 | Census | |
| | Rosees | 1472 | Raymond | 13 | Affièvement | |
| | Arrosers | 1487 | Raymond | 13 | Establishments | |
| | Rosses | 1538 | Raymond | 13 | Reformation | |
| | Arrosees | 1538 | Raymond | 13 | Reformation | |
| | Arrozes | 1546 | Raymond | 13 | Reformation | |
| | Rosez | 1675 | Raymond | 13 | Reformation | |
| | Arrouzès | 1686 | Raymond | 13 | Reformation | |
| | Rosés | 1750 | Cassini | | | |
| | Arroses | 1793 | Ldh/EHESS/Cassini | | | |
| Arblé | Arblé | 1863 | Raymond | 9 | | Moor |
| Baradat | Baradat | 1863 | Raymond | 20 | | Farm |
| La Barthe | La Barthe | 1863 | Raymond | 22 | | Moor |
| Chaudelet | Chaudelet | 1863 | Raymond | 49 | | Farm |
| Crestia | Crestiàa | 1863 | Raymond | 53 | | Place |
| Espiau | Espiau | 1863 | Raymond | 61 | | Place |
| Les Garbères | Les Garbères | 1863 | Raymond | 67 | | Farm |
| Le Gog | Le Gog | 1863 | Raymond | 72 | | Farm |
| Les Grabes | Les Grabes | 1863 | Raymond | 73 | | Farm |
| Lamothe | Lamothe | 1863 | Raymond | 91 | | Mill |
| Larbareng | Larbareng | 1863 | Raymond | 94 | | Place |
| Lorthe | Lorthe | 1863 | Raymond | 104 | | Place |
| Mané | Mané | 1863 | Raymond | 108 | | Farm |
| La Mothe | La Mota d'Arroses | 1538 | Raymond | 118 | Reformation | Fief, vassal of the Viscounts of Béarn |
| | La Motte | 1863 | Raymond | 118 | | |
| Peirolis | Peirolis | 1863 | Raymond | 133 | | Farm |
| La Salle | Lasalle | 1776 | Raymond | 154 | Terrier | Farm |
| Sinsoos | Sinsoos | 1863 | Raymond | 161 | | Farm |

Sources:

- Raymond: Topographic Dictionary of the Department of Basses-Pyrenees, 1863, on the page numbers indicated in the table. (in French)
- Grosclaude: Toponymic Dictionary of communes, Béarn, 2006 (in French)
- Cassini: Cassini Map from 1750
- Ldh/EHESS/Cassini: Des villages de Cassini aux communes d'aujourd'hui: Commune data sheet Arrosès, EHESS (in French).

Origins:

- Census: Census of Béarn
- Affièvement: Titles of affièvement of Arrosès
- Establishments: Register of Establishments of Béarn
- Reformation: Reformation of Béarn
- Terrier: Terrier of Arrosès.

== History ==
Paul Raymond noted on page 13 of his 1863 dictionary that in 1385, Arrosès had 31 fires and depended on the bailiwick of Lembeye. There was a Tithe in Arrosès parish called Sainte-Rose.

== Administration ==
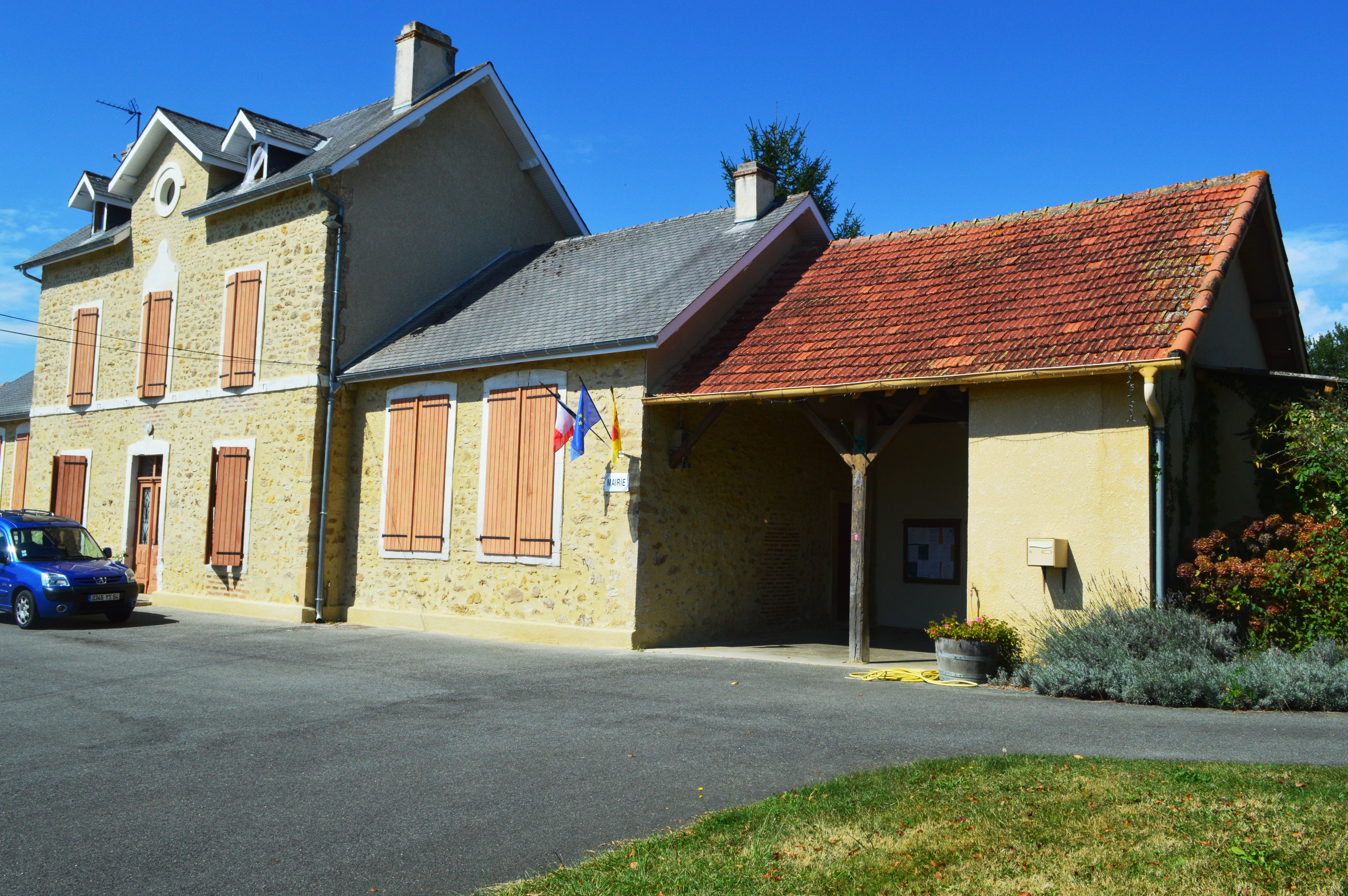
The Town Hall

List of Successive Mayors

| From | To | Name |
|---|---|---|
| 1995 | 2001 | Francis Cazenave |
| 2001 | 2008 | Gérard Saint-Martin |
| 2008 | 2014 | Christian Labat |
| 2014 | 2026 | Michel Cantounet |

=== Inter-communality ===
The commune is part of five inter-communal structures:

- the Communauté de communes du Nord-Est Béarn;
- the highways SIVU of the Canton of Lembeye
- the AEP association of Crouseilles;
- the SIVU for educational regrouping in Aurions-idernes, Arrosès, Séméacq-Blachon, and Moncaup;
- the Energy association of Pyrénées-Atlantiques;

== Demography ==
Historical population

| Year | Pop. | ±% p.a. |
|---|---|---|
| 1793 | 466 | — |
| 1821 | 463 | −0.02% |
| 1846 | 679 | +1.54% |
| 1872 | 492 | −1.23% |
| 1901 | 403 | −0.69% |
| 1926 | 267 | −1.63% |
| 1946 | 198 | −1.48% |
| 1962 | 187 | −0.36% |
| 1968 | 203 | +1.38% |

| Year | Pop. | ±% p.a. |
|---|---|---|
| 1975 | 178 | −1.86% |
| 1982 | 159 | −1.60% |
| 1990 | 145 | −1.15% |
| 1999 | 141 | −0.31% |
| 2007 | 152 | +0.94% |
| 2012 | 147 | −0.67% |
| 2017 | 139 | −1.11% |
| 2023 | 136 | −0.36% |

Source: EHESS and INSEE

== Economy ==
The town is part of the Appellation d'origine contrôlée (AOC) zones of Madiran, Pacherenc-du-vic-bilh, and Béarn AOC.

== Culture and Heritage ==
=== Civil heritage ===
A number of structures have been identified as historical monuments. These are:

- A Fortified complex (Motte-and-bailey castle, courtyard, house) indicates the presence of a lordship in the 11th century.
- Of 50 Houses and Farms surveyed by the Ministry of Culture, 25 were built prior to 1871.
- The Chateau of Sauvernéa at a place called Mombet is a notable house built in the 18th century. Other objects at Mombet are:
  - A Tombstone dated 1762.
  - A sideboard (18th century)
  - A weathervane (18th century)
- A Farm at a place called Flandres from 1746.

A Hilarri located at a house in the Bouézou area dates to the 17th century. It came from the old church which is now destroyed.

=== Religious heritage ===
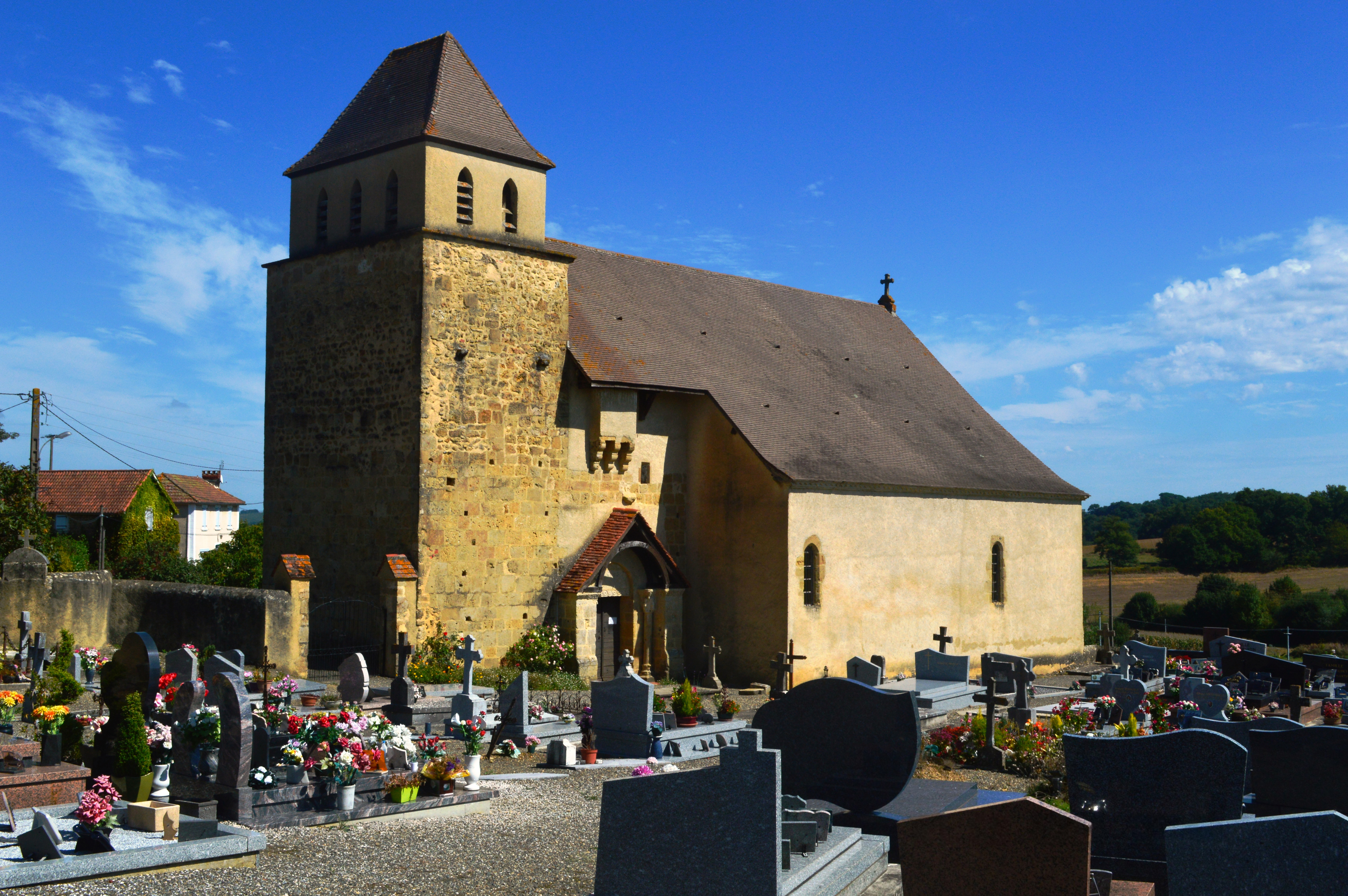
The Church of Our Lady of the Assumption

The Church of Our Lady of the Assumption partially dates to the 12th century. It contains many items which have been registered. These are:

- Front of the Altar (19th century)
- Processional Cross (17th or 18th century)
- Stations of the Cross (19th century)
- Altar candlestick (19th century)
- Processional Banner (19th century)
- Lectern (18th century)
- Pulpit (18th century)
- Tenebrae candlestick (18th century (?))
- Stoup (2) (12th or 13th century)
- Stoup (1) (15th or 16th century)
- Baptismal font (12th and 17th centuries)
- Confessional (18th century)
- Statue: Saint Rose (18th century)
- Retable of Saint Rose (18th century)
- Altar, 2 altar steps, tabernacle, Retable, Painting (18th-19th centuries)
- Altar Cross (19th century)
- Painting: Assumption (18th century)
- 4 Statues (18th century)
- Retable (18th century)
- 6 Statues (18th century (?))
- Tabernacle, exhibit (18th century (?))
- Altar (18th century)
- Ensemble of the Virgin (18th-19th centuries)
- Panelling on the surfaces (18th century)

== See also ==
- Communes of the Pyrénées-Atlantiques department
