= Aurions-Idernes =

- Commune
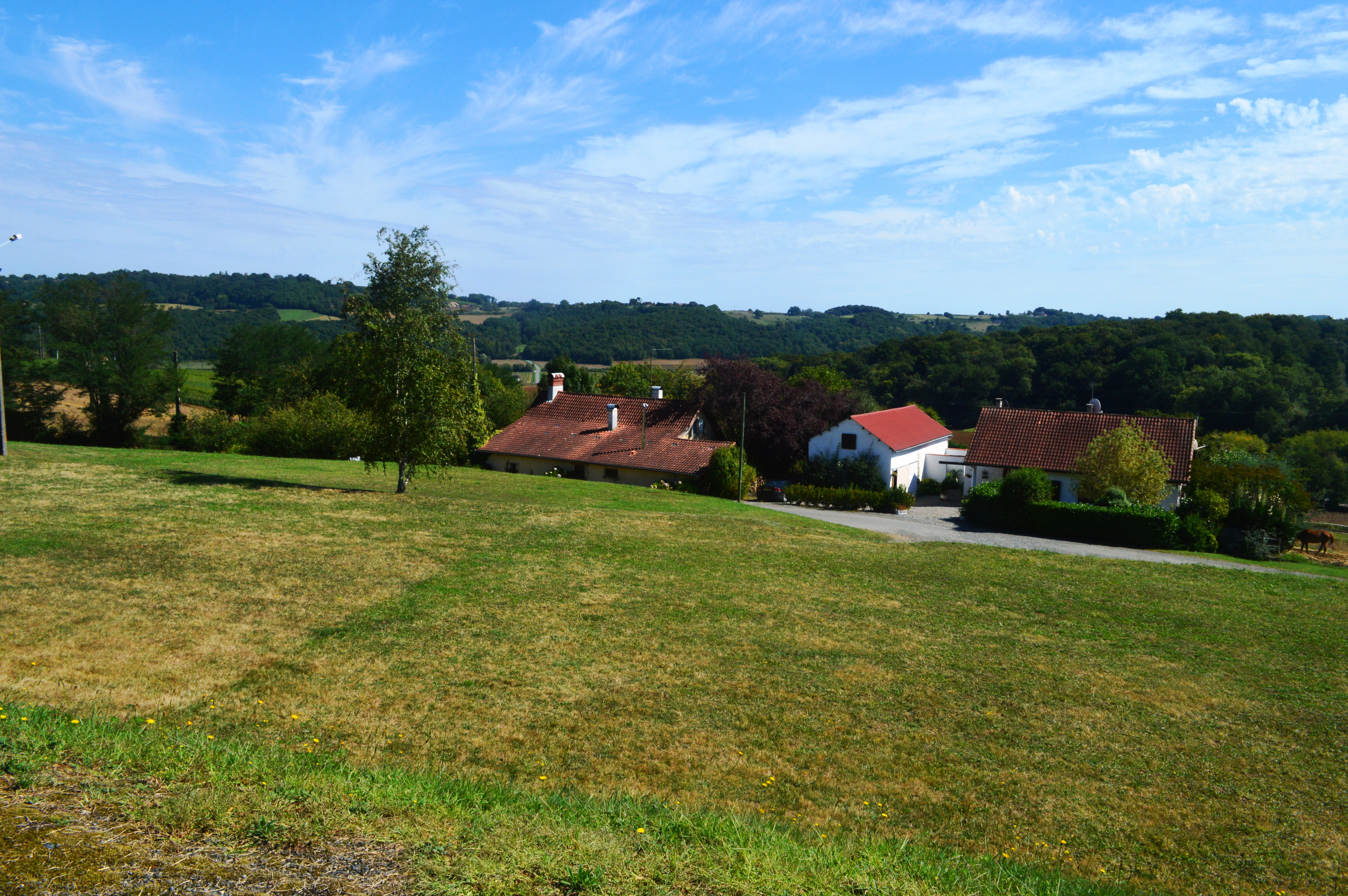
- A general view of Aurions-Idernes
- Location of Aurions-Idernes
- Location within France Location within Nouvelle-Aquitaine
- Coordinates: 43°32′20″N 0°08′14″W
- Country: France
- Region: Nouvelle-Aquitaine
- Department: Pyrénées-Atlantiques
- Arrondissement: Pau
- Canton: Terres des Luys et Coteaux du Vic-Bilh
- Intercommunality: Nord-Est Béarn

Government
  - Mayor (2020–2026): Benoît Monplaisir
- Area^{1}: 6.32 km^{2} (2.44 sq mi)
- Elevation: 173 m (568 ft)
- Highest elevation: 284 m (932 ft)
- Lowest elevation: 136 m (446 ft)
- Population (2023): 112
  - Density: 17.7/km^{2} (45.9/sq mi)
- Time zone: UTC+01:00 (CET)
  - Summer (DST): UTC+02:00 (CEST)
- INSEE/Postal code: 64079 /64350
- ^{1} French Land Register data, which excludes lakes, ponds, glaciers > 1 km^{2} (0.386 sq mi or 247 acres) and river estuaries.

Aurions-Idernes (French pronunciation: [oʁjɔ̃ idɛʁn]; Occitan: Aurions e Idèrnas) is a commune in the Pyrénées-Atlantiques department in the Nouvelle-Aquitaine region of south-western France.

== Geography ==
Aurions-Idernes is located approximately 50 km north-east of Pau and 12 km north-west of Maubourguet. Access to the commune is by the D205 road from Séméacq-Blachon in the south, which passes through the length of the commune on the eastern side and continues north to join the D317. Access to the village is by the D219 road from Arrosès in the east which passes through the village and continues south-west to join the D13 near Cadillon. The commune is mainly farmland with some forested areas.

The Larcis river forms most of the eastern border of the commune as it flows north to join the Lées east of Ségos. Several unnamed tributaries rise in the commune and flow east to join the Larcis.

=== Places and hamlets ===
- L'Abbat
- Aurions
- Les Barsious
- Biau
- Bitaillou
- Bouché
- Cassou
- Clocq
- Crampilh
- Dumas
- Farandou
- Froment
- Hourcadet
- Idernes
- Labatte
- Lafitau
- Lafontaa
- Lahaille
- Larribau
- Pin
- Poublan
- Pouchan
- Sy
- Le Tétour

== Toponymy ==
The commune name in béarnais is Aurions-Idèrnas. Michel Grosclaude indicated that Aurions is probably from the Latin man's name Aurius with the suffix -onis giving "Domain of Aurius". The origin of the name Idernes however remains obscure.

The following table details the origins of the commune name and other names in the commune.

Name	Spelling	Date	Source	Page	Origin	Description
Aurions	Ryons	1227	Raymond	17	Marca	Village
	Aurios	1385	Raymond	17	Census	
	Riontz	1538	Raymond	17	Reformation	
	Aurious	1750	Cassini			
Idernes	Ydernes	1385	Raymond	81	Census	Village
	Ydernas	1540	Raymond	81	Reformation	
	Idernes	1750	Cassini			
L'Abbat	L'Abbat	1863	Raymond	1		Moor
Les Barsious	Les Barsious	1863	Raymond	22		Moor
Cailhabet	Cailhabet	1863	Raymond	39		Farm
Castéra	Castéra	1863	Raymond	44		Place
Disse	Düsse	1487	Raymond	55	Establishments	Hamlet
	Dissa	1538	Raymond	55	Reformation	
	Dyssa	1546	Raymond	55	Reformation	
L'Enclos	L'Enclos	1863	Raymond	59		Hamlet
Serramone	Serramona	1538	Raymond	159	Reformation	Fief
	Sarramonne	1675	Raymond	159	Reformation	
	Sarramoune	1780	Raymond	159	Aurions	

Sources:

- Raymond: Topographic Dictionary of the Department of Basses-Pyrenees, 1863, on the page numbers indicated in the table. (in French)
- Grosclaude: Toponymic Dictionary of communes, Béarn, 2006 (in French)
- Cassini: Cassini Map from 1750

Origins:

- Marca: Pierre de Marca, History of Béarn.
- Census: Census of Béarn
- Reformation: Reformation of Béarn
- Establishments: Register of Establishments of Béarn
- Aurions: Terrier of Aurions.

== History ==
Paul Raymond noted on page 17 of the 1863 dictionary that in 1385 Aurions and Idernes depended on the bailiwick of Lembeye and respectively had 11 and 13 fires.

Idernes was merged with Aurions in 1844. In 1846 the commune, which had been part of the Canton of Garlin, changed to be part of the Canton of Lembeye.

== Administration ==
List of Successive Mayors

From	To	Name
1995	2008	André Lagrave
2008	2020	Nadine Oulie
2020	2026	Benoît Monplaisir

=== Inter-communality ===
The commune is part of five inter-communal structures:

- the Communauté de communes du Nord-Est Béarn;
- the SIVU for Highways in the Canton of Lembeye;
- the SIVU for the educational grouping of Aurions-Idernes, Arrosès, Séméacq-Blachon, and Moncaup;
- the Energy association of Pyrénées-Atlantiques;
- the inter-communal association for the management of drinking water (SIAEP) of Vic-Bilh Montanérès;

== Demography ==
The inhabitants of the commune are known as Aurionais or Aurionaises in French.

Historical population

Year	Pop.	±% p.a.
1793	204	—
1821	205	+0.02%
1846	451	+3.20%
1872	331	−1.18%
1901	236	−1.16%
1926	201	−0.64%
1946	175	−0.69%
1962	169	−0.22%
1968	174	+0.49%

Year	Pop.	±% p.a.
1975	144	−2.67%
1982	157	+1.24%
1990	141	−1.33%
1999	117	−2.05%
2007	113	−0.43%
2012	104	−1.65%
2017	104	+0.00%
2023	112	+1.24%

Source: EHESS and INSEE

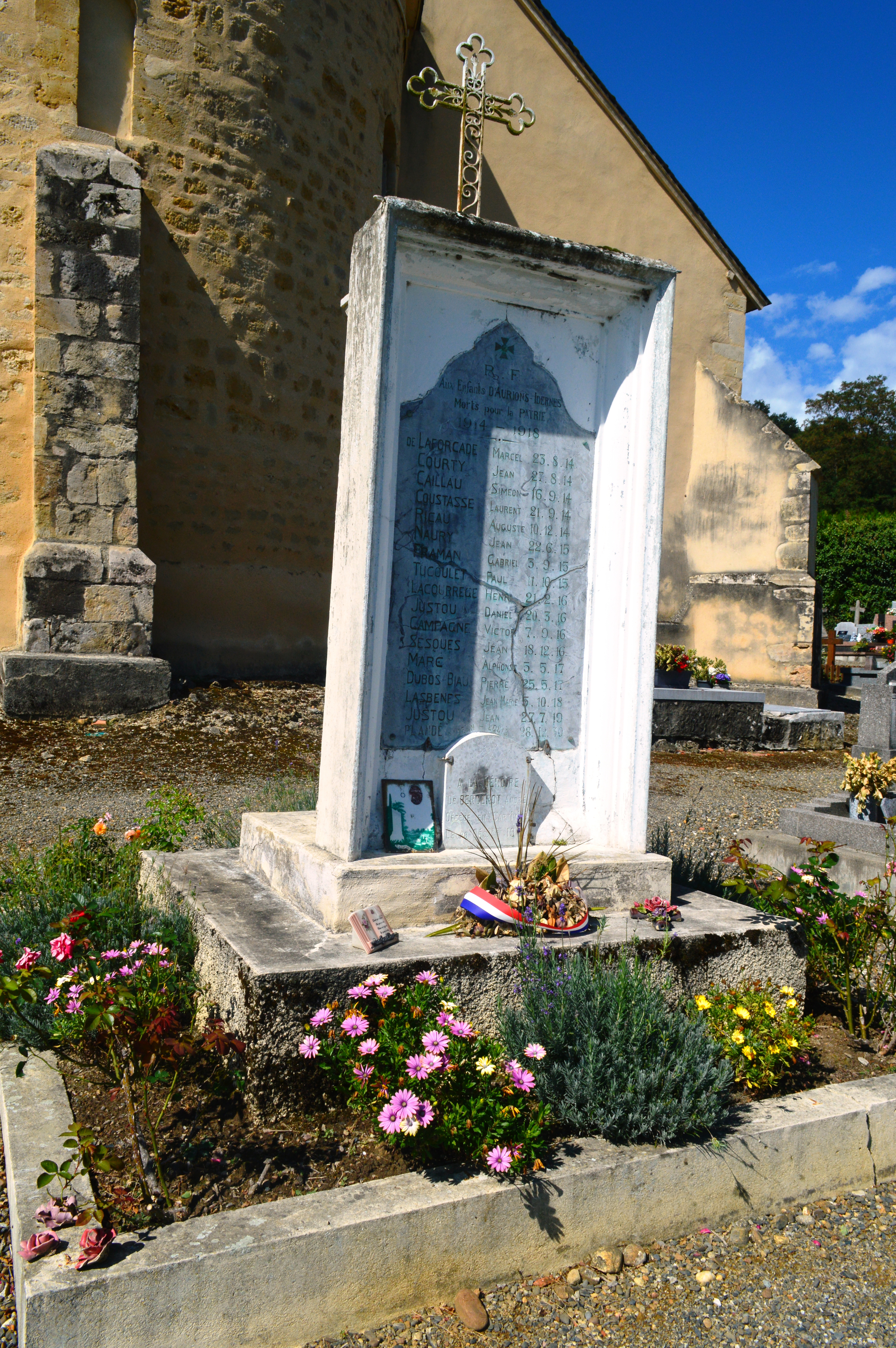
Aurions-Idernes War Memorial

== Economy ==
The commune is part of the appellation d'origine contrôlée (AOC) zones of Madiran, Pacherenc-du-vic-bilh, and Béarn.

== Culture and heritage ==
=== Civil heritage ===
The commune has a number of buildings and structures that are registered as historical monuments:

- Houses and Farms
- Fortified Buildings at Aurions-Barsious (Late Middle Ages)
- Fortified Buildings at Aurions-le-Tétour (Late Middle Ages)

=== Religious heritage ===
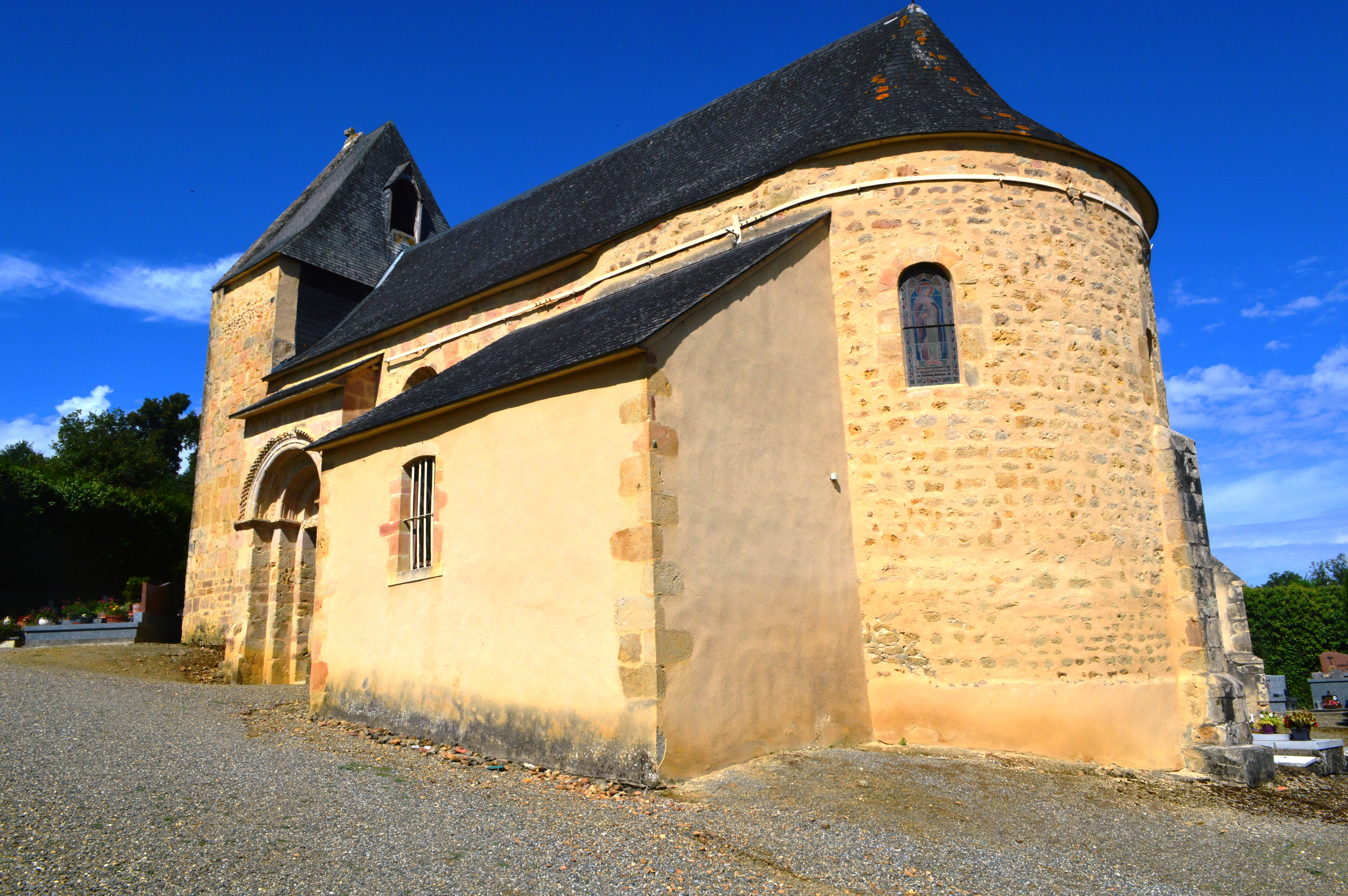
The Church of Saint Pierre of Aurions

The commune has several religious buildings and structures that are registered as historical monuments:

- The Parish Church of Saint Pierre of Aurions (12th century) The Church contains many items that are registered as historical objects:
  - A Wayside Cross (19th century)
  - 2 tablecloths for the choir enclosure (19th century)
  - A Pulpit (18th century)
  - An Altar, altar seating, Tabernacle, and a statue (19th century)
  - 4 Altar candlesticks (19th century)
  - A Painting: Christ on the Cross with the Virgin (19th century)
  - A Retable (18th century)
  - A Tabernacle (18th century)
  - Altar seating (18th century)
  - The Main Altar with seating, Tabernacle, Retable, and 4 candlesticks (18th century)
  - The Main Altar (19th century)

Church Picture Gallery

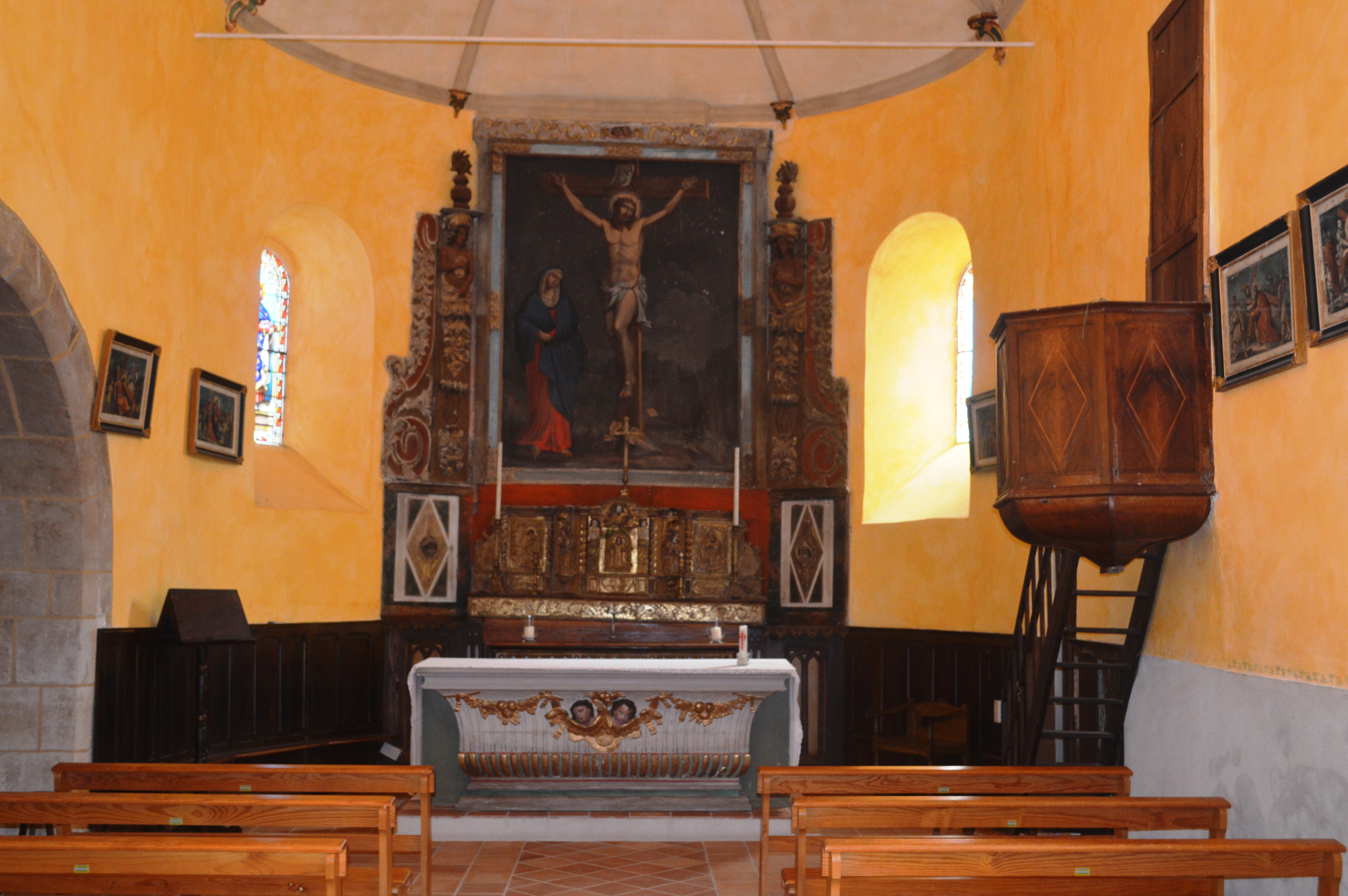
Church of Saint Pierre interior

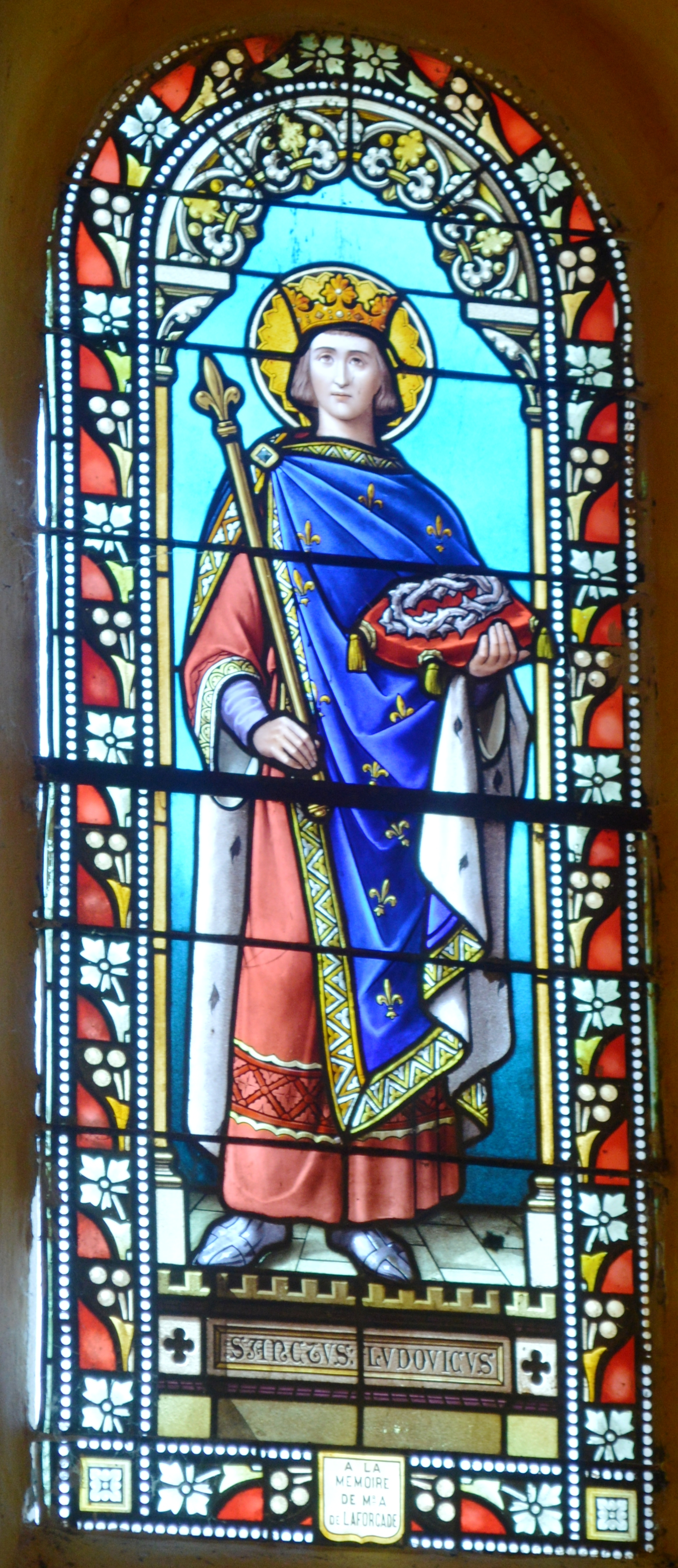
Stained Glass in the Church

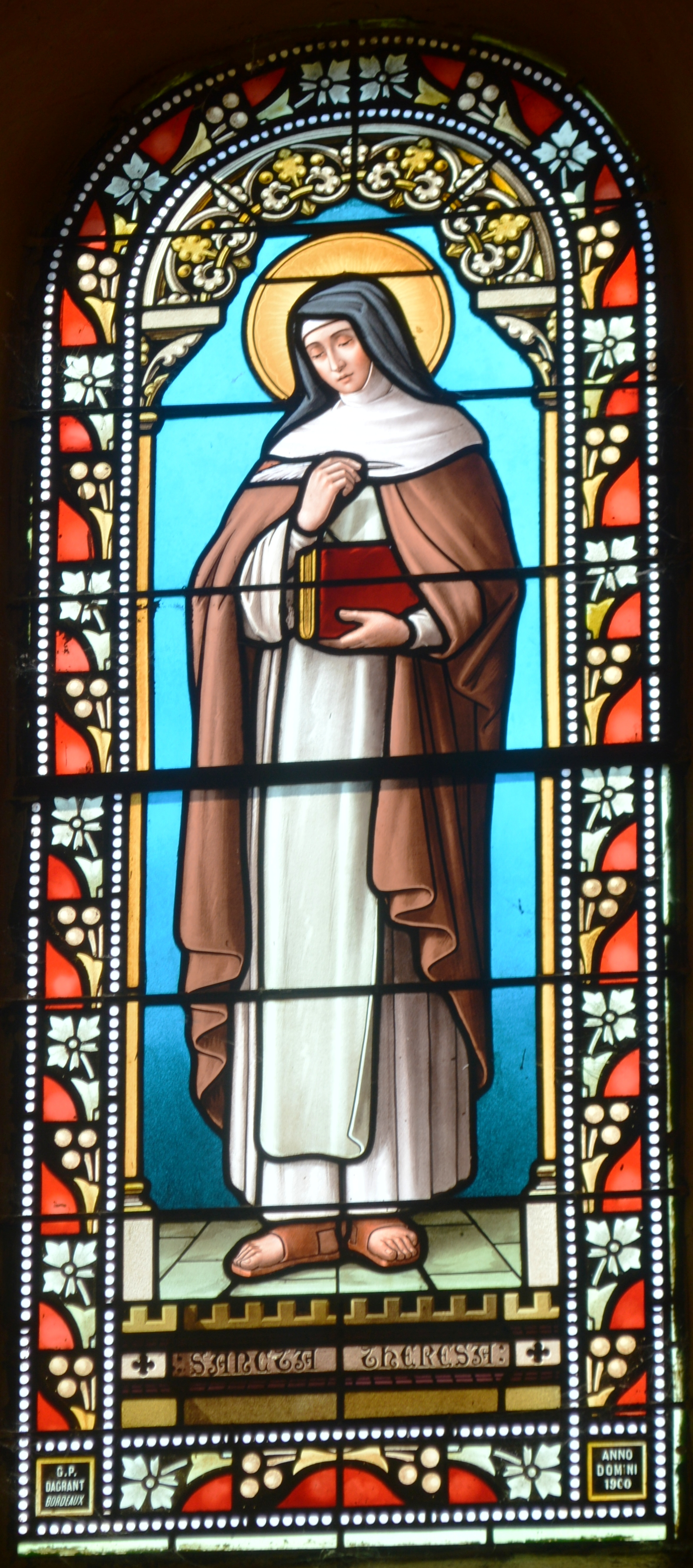
Stained Glass in the Church

== Facilities ==
The commune has a nursery school.

== See also ==
- Communes of the Pyrénées-Atlantiques department
