= Bellocq =

- Commune
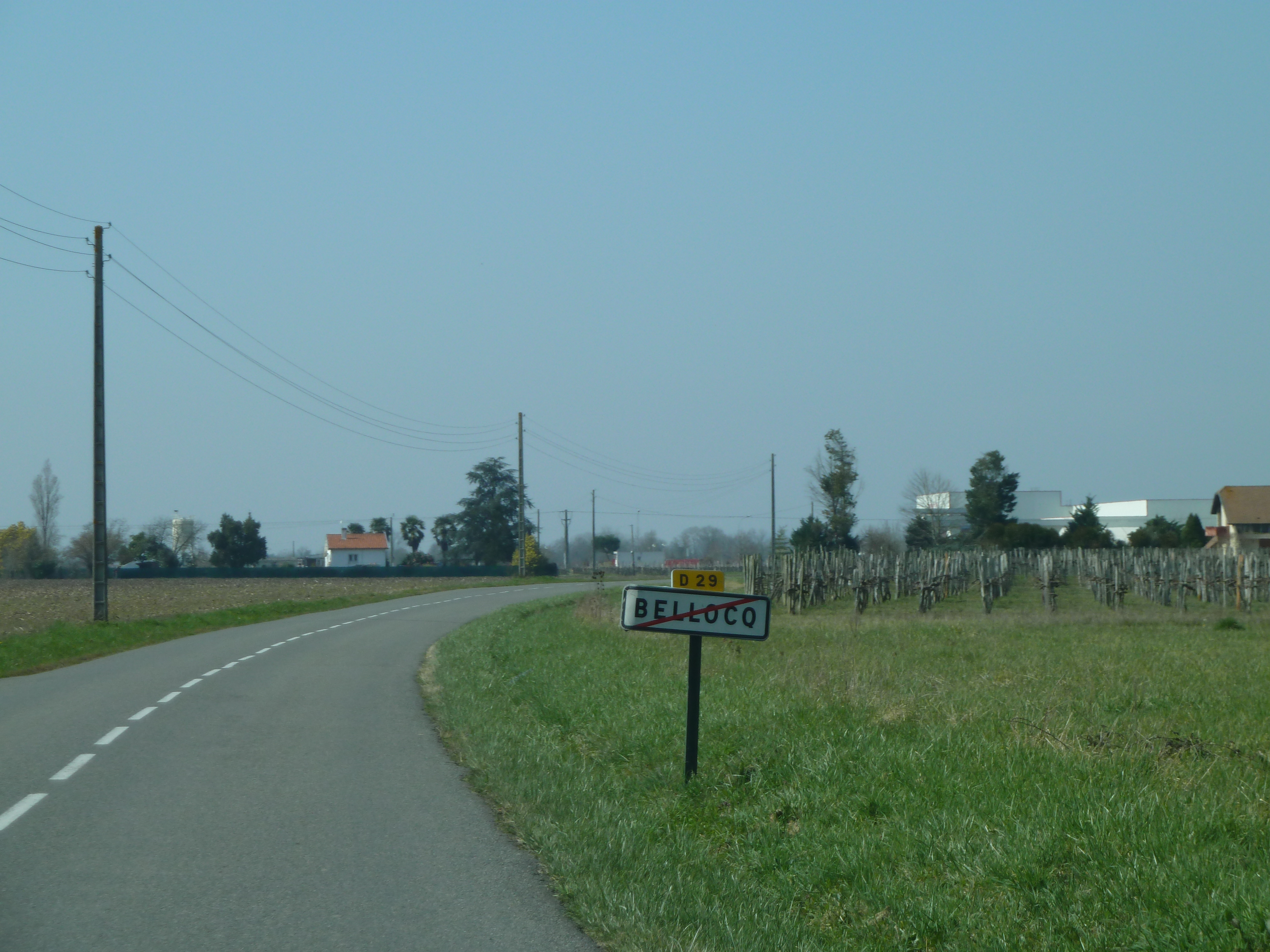
- The road from Bellocq
- Location of Bellocq
- Location within France Location within Nouvelle-Aquitaine
- Coordinates: 43°31′03″N 0°54′53″W
- Country: France
- Region: Nouvelle-Aquitaine
- Department: Pyrénées-Atlantiques
- Arrondissement: Pau
- Canton: Orthez et Terres des Gaves et du Sel

Government
  - Mayor (2020–2026): Idelette Demaison
- Area^{1}: 12.65 km^{2} (4.88 sq mi)
- Elevation: 41 m (135 ft)
- Highest elevation: 159 m (522 ft)
- Lowest elevation: 18 m (59 ft)
- Population (2023): 933
  - Density: 73.8/km^{2} (191/sq mi)
- Time zone: UTC+01:00 (CET)
  - Summer (DST): UTC+02:00 (CEST)
- INSEE/Postal code: 64108 /64270
- ^{1} French Land Register data, which excludes lakes, ponds, glaciers > 1 km^{2} (0.386 sq mi or 247 acres) and river estuaries.

Bellocq (French pronunciation: [bɛlɔk]; Occitan: Bètlòc) is a commune of the Pyrénées-Atlantiques department in southwestern France.

Inhabitants of Bellocq are called Bellocquais in French.

== Economy ==
The commune is part of the wine zone appellation d'origine contrôlée (AOC) du Béarn. Since 1991, the AOC Béarn-Bellocq applies to wines grown in the communes of Bellocq, Lahontan, Orthez and Salies-de-Béarn.

Bellocq is also part of the cheese producing zone d'appellation, l'Ossau-Iraty.

== Sights ==
- The Château de Bellocq is a ruined castle dating partly from the 13th century.

== Personalities ==
- Robert Cazala, born 1934 in Bellocq, former French cyclist.

== See also ==
- Communes of the Pyrénées-Atlantiques department
