= Aubous =

- Commune
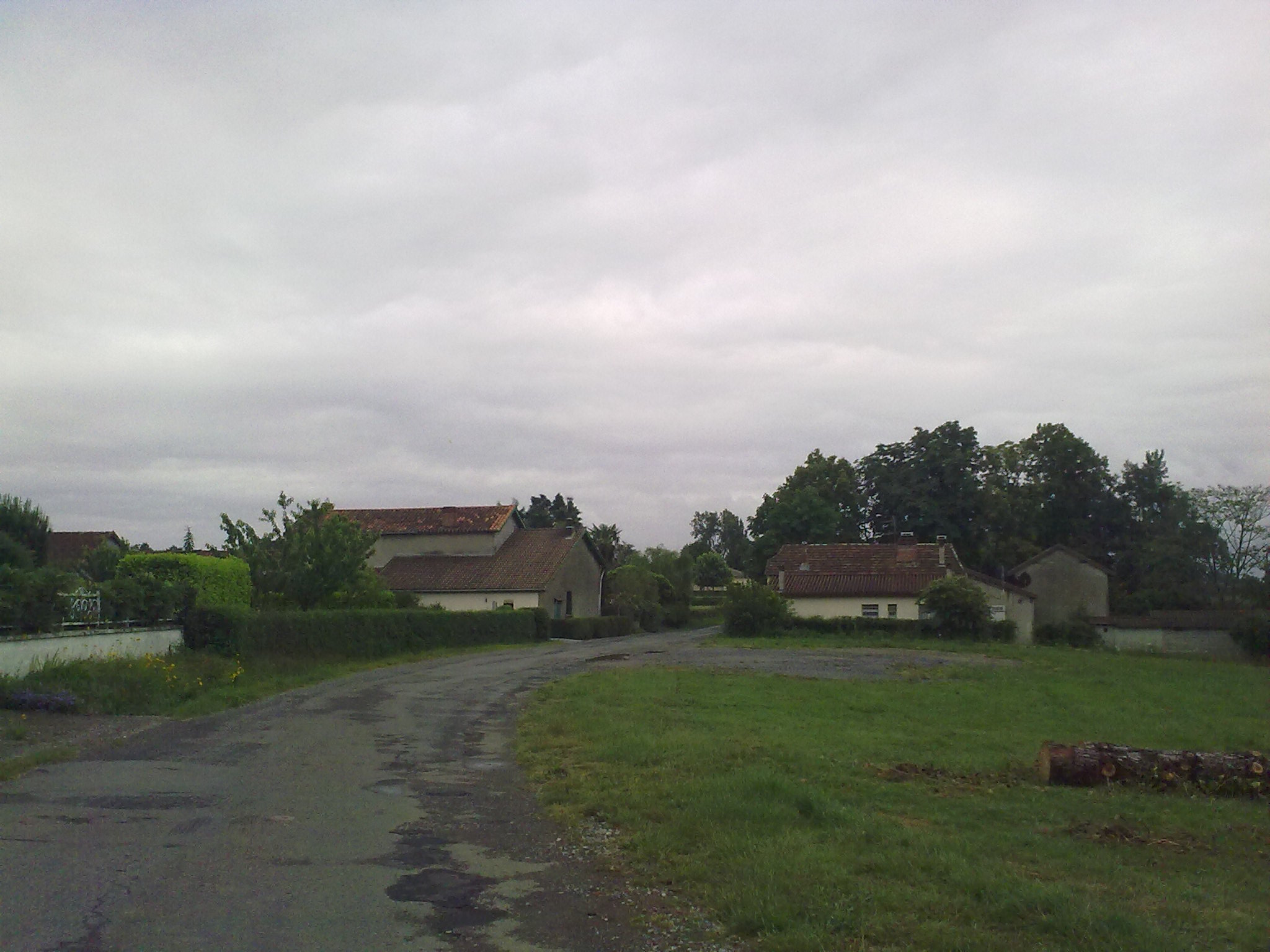
- Aubous Village
- Location of Aubous
- Location within France Location within Nouvelle-Aquitaine
- Coordinates: 43°34′41″N 0°08′01″W
- Country: France
- Region: Nouvelle-Aquitaine
- Department: Pyrénées-Atlantiques
- Arrondissement: Pau
- Canton: Terres des Luys et Coteaux du Vic-Bilh
- Intercommunality: CC Luys en Béarn

Government
  - Mayor (2020–2026): Pierre Poublan
- Area^{1}: 3.78 km^{2} (1.46 sq mi)
- Elevation: 205 m (673 ft)
- Highest elevation: 255 m (837 ft)
- Lowest elevation: 124 m (407 ft)
- Population (2023): 45
  - Density: 12/km^{2} (31/sq mi)
- Time zone: UTC+01:00 (CET)
  - Summer (DST): UTC+02:00 (CEST)
- INSEE/Postal code: 64074 /64330
- ^{1} French Land Register data, which excludes lakes, ponds, glaciers > 1 km^{2} (0.386 sq mi or 247 acres) and river estuaries.

Aubous (French pronunciation: [obus]; Occitan: Aubons) is a commune in the Pyrénées-Atlantiques department in the Nouvelle-Aquitaine region of south-western France.

== Geography ==
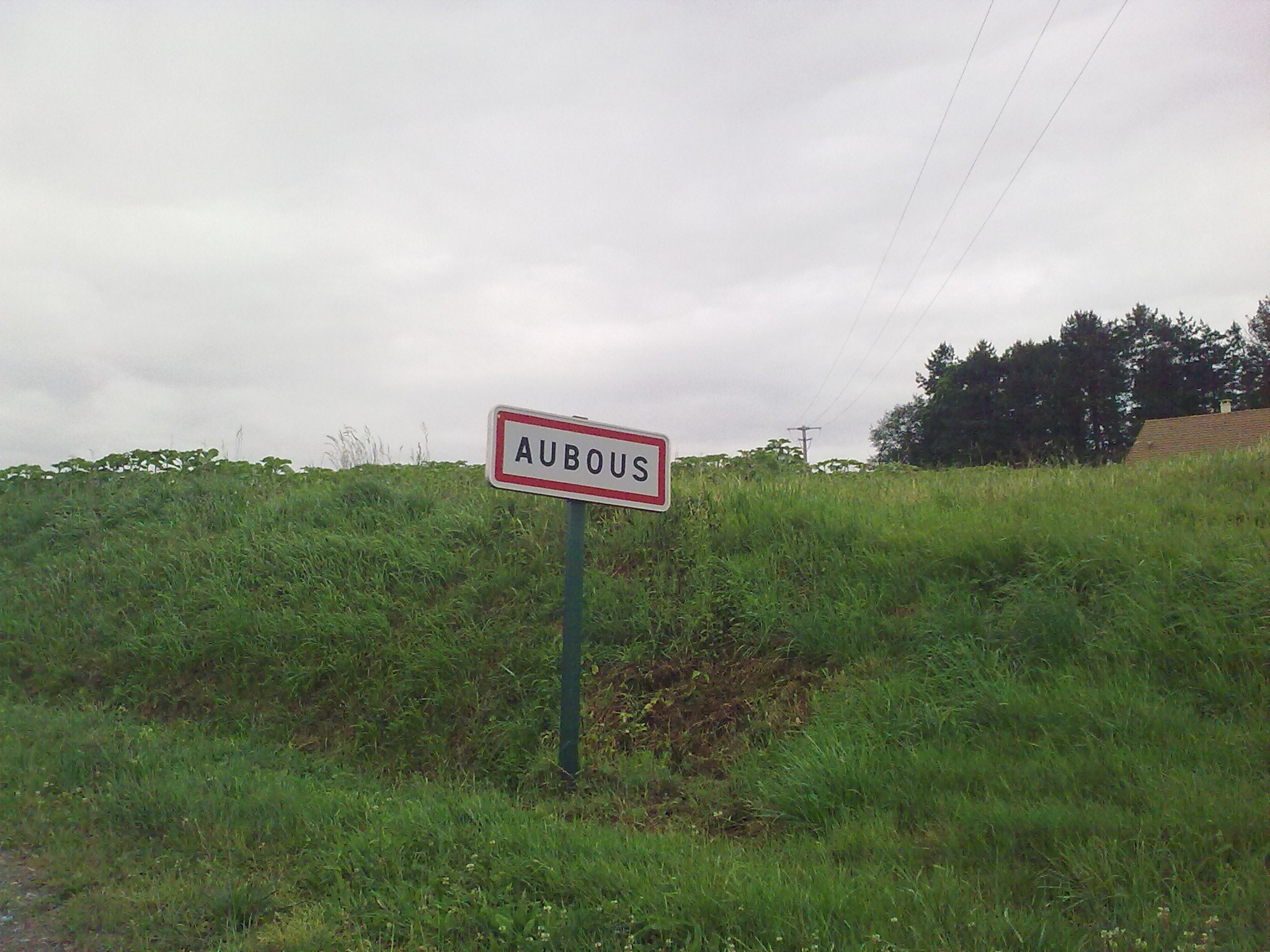
Aubous, le village.

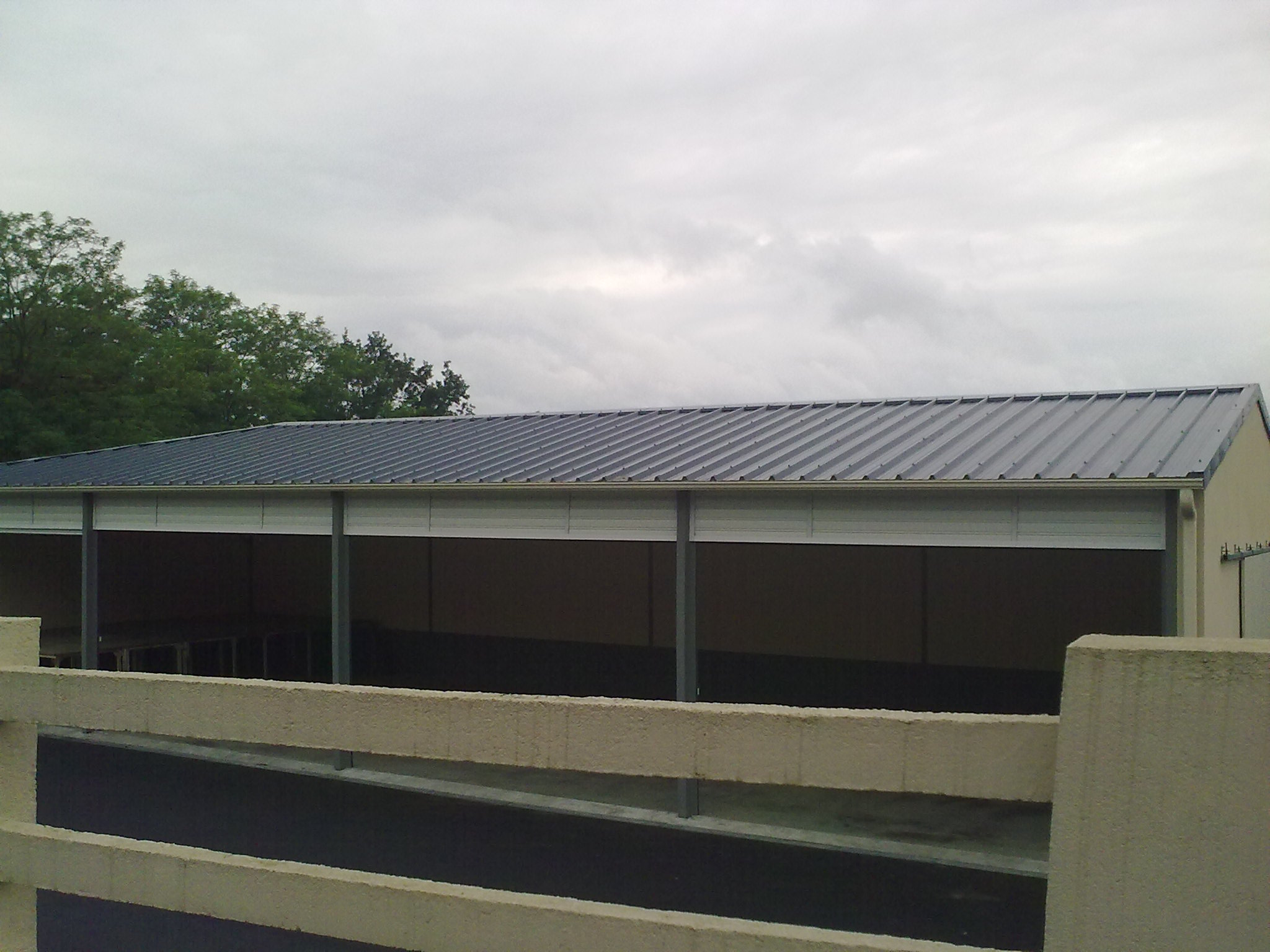
The Community Centre

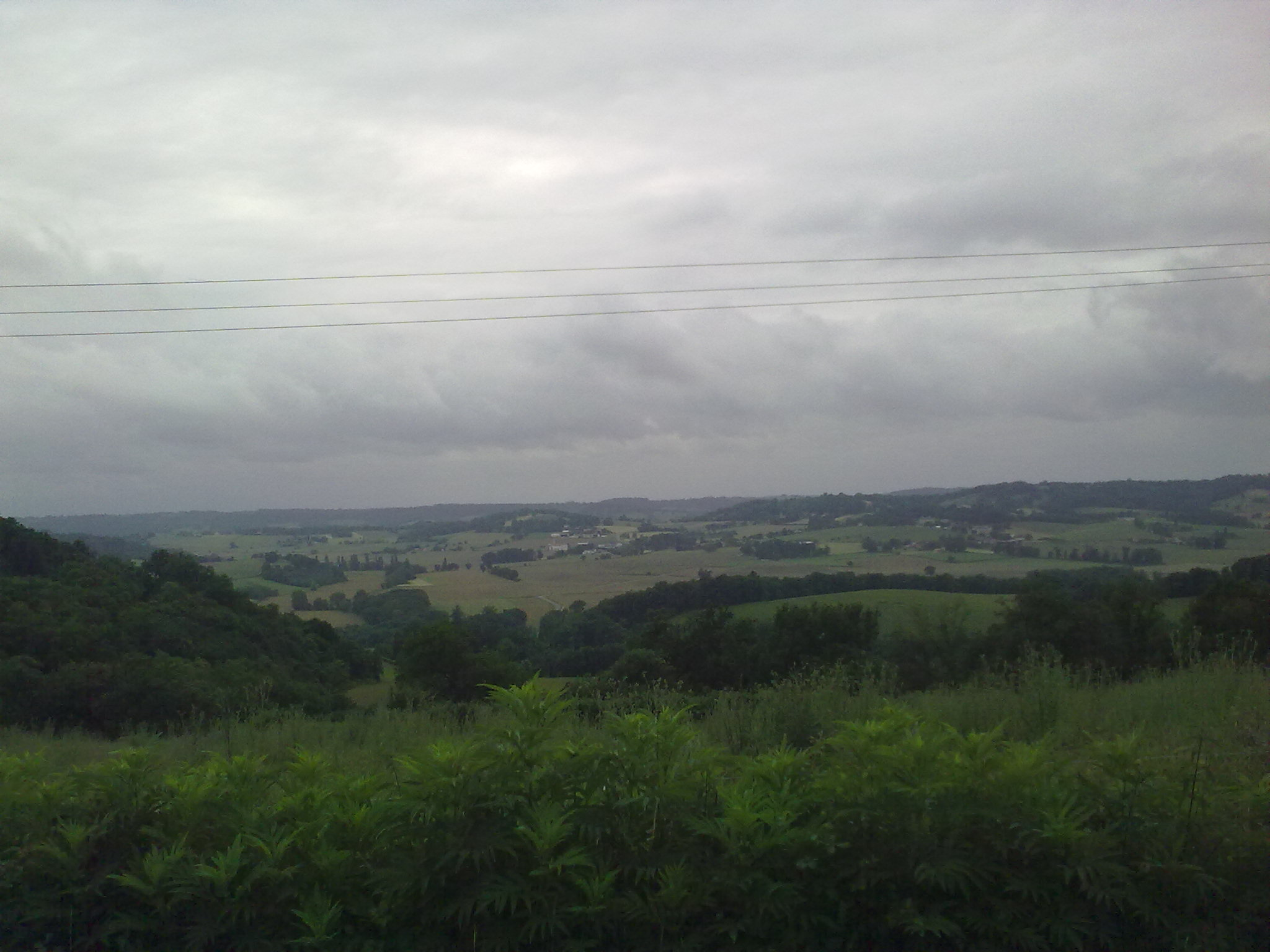
The countryside to the south

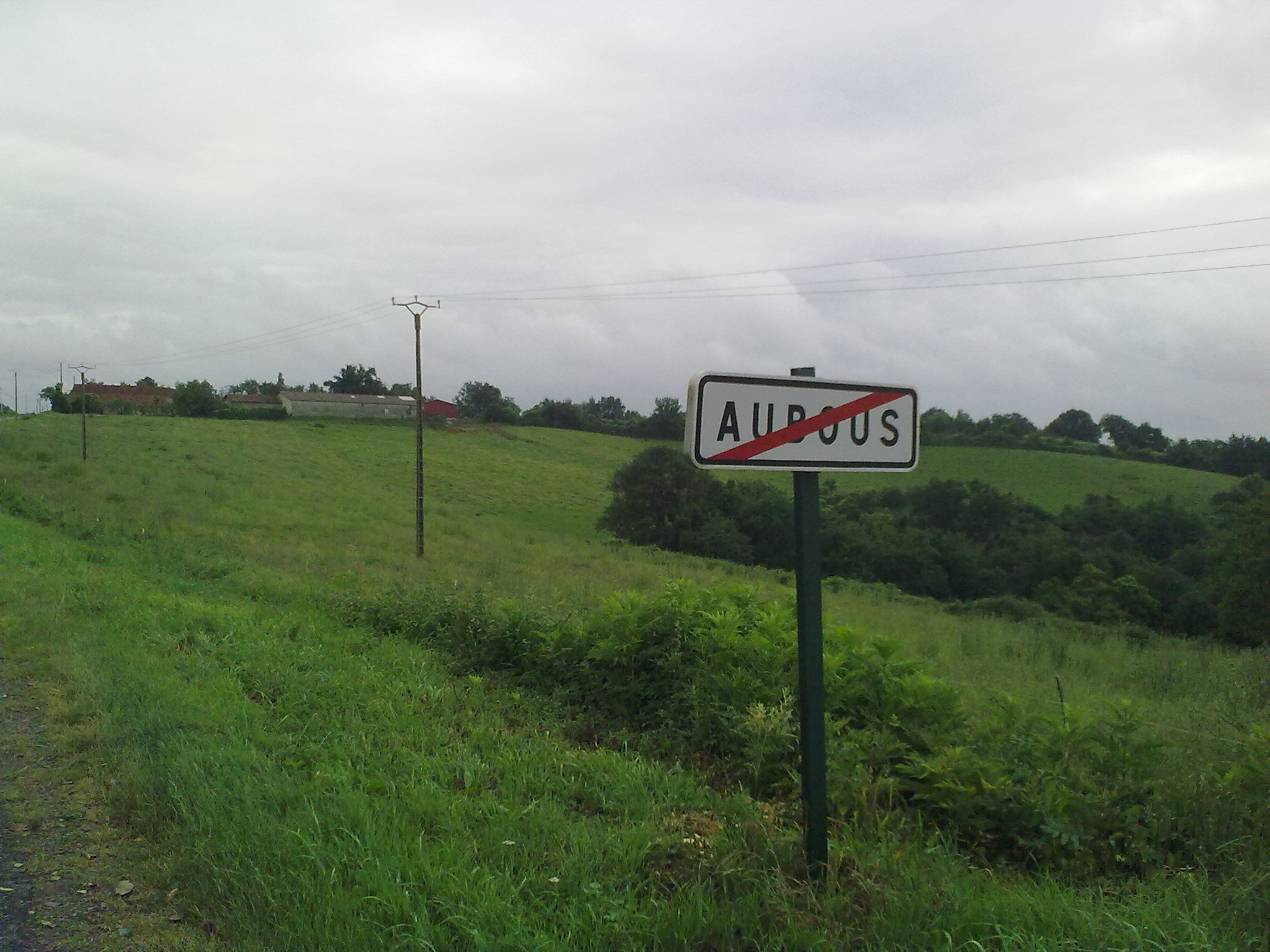
The exit from the village

Aubous is located in the extreme north-east of the department with the northern border of the commune being the border between Pyrénées-Atlantiques and Gers. The commune is about 50 km south-east of Mont-de-Marsan and 50 km north by north-east of Pau. Access to the commune is by the D292 road from Arrosès in the south which passes through the centre of the commune and the village and continues north to join the D22 just north of the commune. The D317 from Aydie in the south-east passes through the western area of the commune before continuing south-west to join the D205. The commune is mixed forest and farmland.

The Larcis river forms the western border of the commune as it flows north-west to join the Léez north-west of Ségos. The Boutigue forms the north-eastern border as it flows east to join the Sager east of the commune.

=== Places and hamlets ===
- Brauchet
- Coulom
- Dulucq
- Gentilloun
- Héouguère
- Lacourtiade
- Lahorgue
- Moulin
- Paillou
- Pillourcq or Pilhourcq
- Plaix
- Rey
- Tapounet
- Troucat

== Toponymy ==
The commune name in béarnais is Aubons. Michel Grosclaude proposed an etymology from the Latin man's name Albus with the suffix -ones, the whole meaning "Domain of Albus".

The following table details the origins of the commune name.

Name	Spelling	Date	Source	Page	Origin	Description
Aubous	Aubos	1385	Raymond	16	Census	Village
	Auboos	14th century	Raymond	16	Census	
	Aubons	1752	Raymond	16	Enumeration	
	Aubous	1750	Grosclaude		Cassini	

Sources:

- Raymond: Topographic Dictionary of the Department of Basses-Pyrenees, 1863, on the page numbers indicated in the table. (in French)
- Grosclaude: Toponymic Dictionary of communes, Béarn, 2006 (in French)

Origins:

- Census: Census of Béarn
- Enumeration: Enumeration of the Viscounty of Béarn
- Cassini: Cassini Map from 1750

== History ==
Paul Raymond said, on page 16 of the 1863 dictionary, that in 1385 Aubous had 4 fires and depended on the bailiwick of Lembeye.

== Administration ==
List of Successive Mayors

From	To	Name
1995	2020	René Paulien
2020	2026	Pierre Poublan

=== Inter-communality ===
The commune is part of five inter-communal structures:

- the Communauté de communes des Luys en Béarn;
- the SIVU of roads in the Garlin area;
- the SIVU of the Lées and its tributaries;
- the Energy association of Pyrénées-Atlantiques;
- the inter-communal association for the management of drinking water Luy - Gabas - Lées;

== Demography ==
Historical population

Year	Pop.	±% p.a.
1793	189	—
1821	258	+1.12%
1846	289	+0.45%
1872	205	−1.31%
1901	114	−2.00%
1926	105	−0.33%
1946	110	+0.23%
1954	98	−1.43%
1962	77	−2.97%

Year	Pop.	±% p.a.
1968	64	−3.04%
1975	57	−1.64%
1982	65	+1.89%
1990	48	−3.72%
1999	53	+1.11%
2007	51	−0.48%
2012	52	+0.39%
2017	48	−1.59%
2023	45	−1.07%

Source: EHESS and INSEE

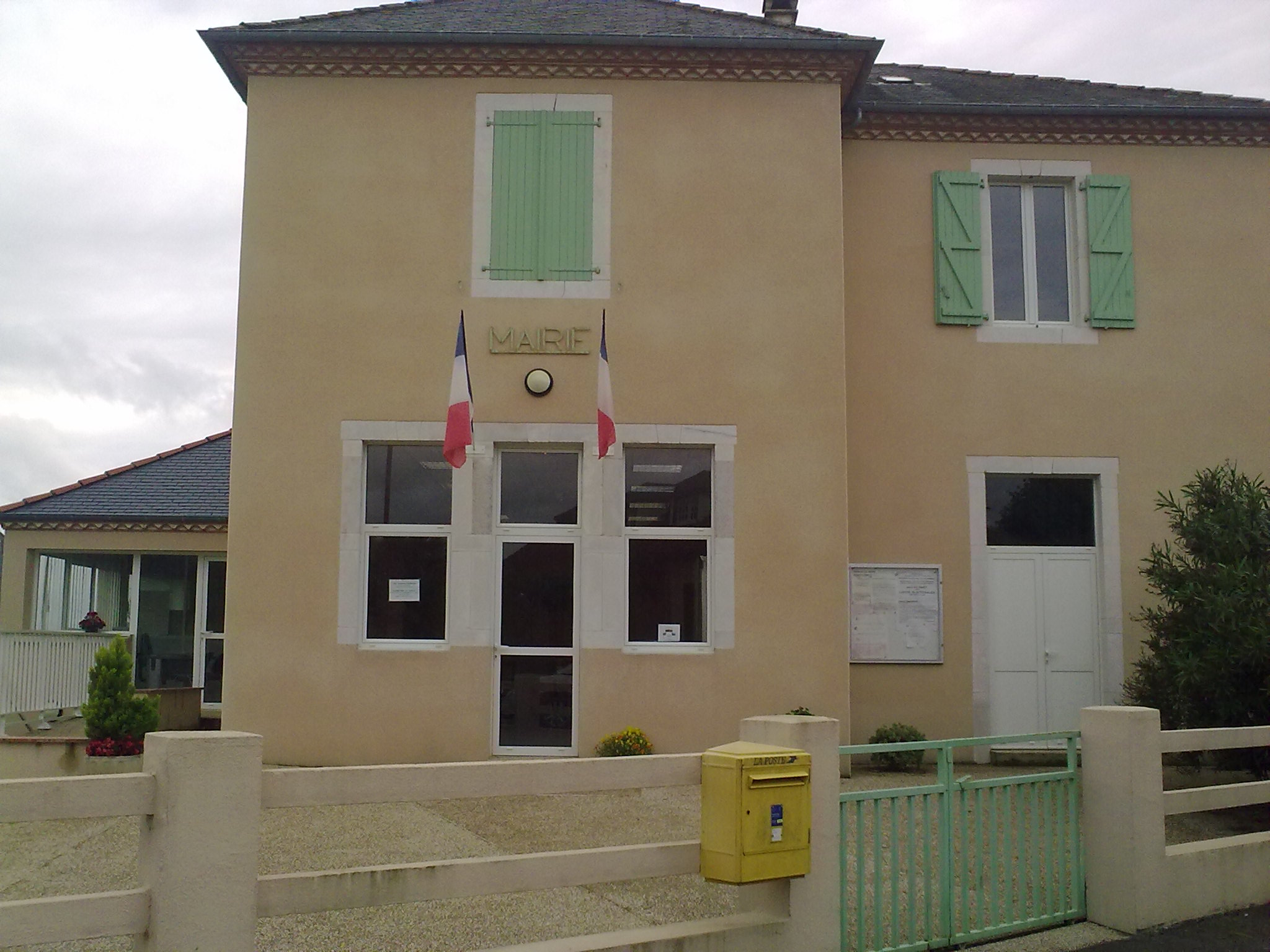
The Town Hall

== Economy ==
The commune is part of the appellation d'origine contrôlée (AOC) zones of Madiran, Pacherenc-du-vic-bilh, and Béarn.

== Culture and heritage ==
=== Civil heritage ===
The commune has many buildings and structures that are registered as historical monuments:

- The Maison Viau Farmhouse at Lacourtiade (19th century)
- A Farmhouse at Rey (1796)
- A Farmhouse at Pillourcq (19th century)
- A Farmhouse at Coulom (1810)
- Houses and Farms (18th-19th centuries)
- A Mill at Moulin (1830)
- A Campsite (Prehistoric)
- The Campsite of Caesar at Gentilloun (Prehistoric)

=== Religious heritage ===
The commune has two religious buildings and structures that are registered as historical monuments:

- The Saint-Quitterie Devotional Fountain (18th century)
- The Parish Church of Saint-Quitterie (12th century)

The Church contains many items that are registered as historical objects:

- A Sanctuary Lamp (18th century)
- The Altar facing (17th century)
- A Cope and a Chasuble (19th century)
- A Bronze Bell (1821)
- 4 Altar Candlesticks (18th century)
- A Celebrant's Chair (18th century)
- A Painting: Saint-Quitterie (18th century)
- 2 Statues: Saint Peter and Saint Paul (1730 & 1780)
- A Retable (1730-1750)
- Altar seating and a Tabernacle (17th century)
- The Main Altar facing (12th century)
- Altar, Altar seating, Tabernacle, Retable, Celebrant's Chair, 4 Altar Candlesticks (17th century)
- A Processional Banner (20th century)
- A Sanctuary Lamp (18th century)
- A bank of Pews
- 2 banks of Pews (18th century)
- Furniture in the Sacristy (18th century)
- A Suspended Stoup (17th century)
- A Pulpit (18th century)
- Baptismal fonts and a Stoup (17th century)

== See also ==
- Communes of the Pyrénées-Atlantiques department

=== External links ===
- Aubous on Géoportail, National Geographic Institute (IGN) website (in French)
- Aubous on the 1750 Cassini Map
