= Château de Bellocq =

Castle in Bellocq, France

Coordinates: 43°31′3″N 0°54′51″W

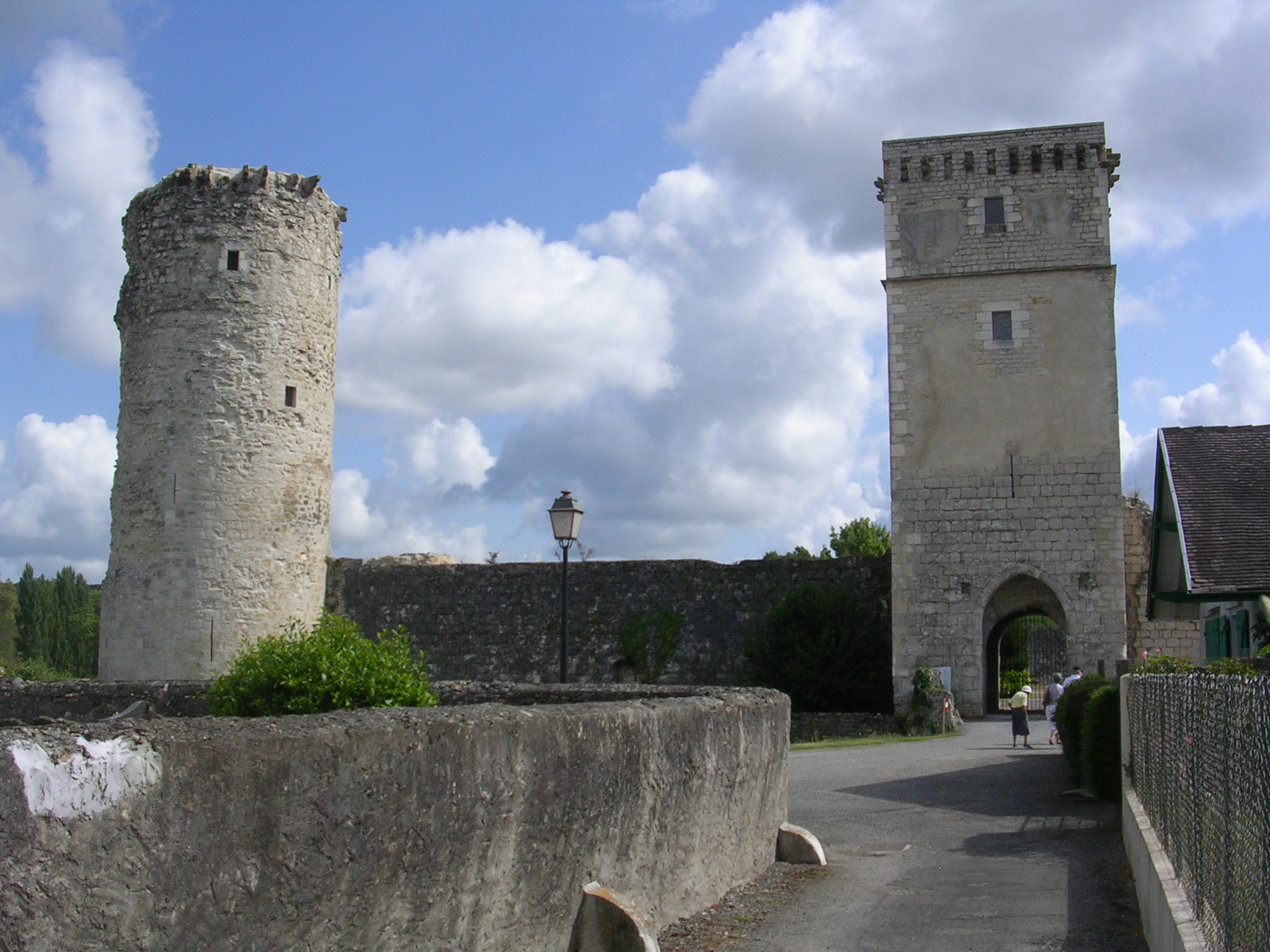
Château de Bellocq

The ruins of the Château de Bellocq are in the commune of Bellocq in the Pyrénées-Atlantiques département of France.

This Béarnaise fortress from the end of the 13th century consists of an irregular quadrilateral reinforced by seven towers, linked to the fortified house built in 1281. It was remodelled during the 14th century. The castle was burned down by Louis XIII in 1620 to prevent it being used by Protestants.

== History ==
At the end of the 13th century, Bellocq was at the frontier with English controlled Guyenne. Gaston VII Moncade de Béarn built the castle on the Gave de Pau, the main river access to Béarn, to fortify his territory. Construction took place between 1250 and 1280. From the beginning, the castle was intended to house a large garrison. The simple plan of an irregular quadrilateral without a keep had four round towers, a semicircular tower and two square towers, one of which formed the main entrance. The curtain walls were pierced with cruciform arrow slits.

A year after completion of the castle, Gaston VII built a bastide close by and this, as well as the fortified church of Bellocq, became integral parts of the complex.

In 1370, Gaston Fébus reinforced the castle and built new strong points in order to preserve his territory's independence from the powerful kingdoms of France, England and Navarre.

In 1542, Henri II d'Albret (Henry II of Navarre) repaired the castle, in case of a Spanish invasion. From this date, the kings of Navarre sometimes left their castle at Pau for the country of Bellocq. Jeanne d'Albret stayed there regularly in the 16th century while she took the waters at Salies-de-Béarn.

In 1568, the French king Charles IX sent the baron of Terride to subjugate and govern the Béarn, then largely Protestant. Terride's troops occupied the region and re-established the Catholic hierarchy. The following year, Jeanne d'Albret asked count Gabriel de Montgomery to form an army of resistance - the castle at Bellocq passed into Catholic hands. It resisted a short siege by Montgomery. In 1620, the Béarn Protestants once again gaining power, Louis XIII had the castle burned down to prevent it being of use to them in the future.

From 1620, the castle played no further role in the history of the region and fell into disrepair. In 1925, the ruins were declared a monument historique and in 1997 they were classed as a Monument de France by the French Ministry of Culture.

== See also ==
- List of castles in France
