= Lauzet =

Variety of grape

Lauzet is a white French wine grape variety that is permitted in the Appellation d'Origine Contrôlée (AOC) wines of the Jurançon region. For most of the 20th century its numbers have been declining and today the grape is near extinction.

== Synonyms ==
Various synonyms have been used to describe Lauzet and its wines, including Laouset, Lauzet Blanc and Lercat Blanc.
