= Crouseilles =

- Commune
- Location of Crouseilles
- Location within France Location within Nouvelle-Aquitaine
- Coordinates: 43°31′33″N 0°05′17″W
- Country: France
- Region: Nouvelle-Aquitaine
- Department: Pyrénées-Atlantiques
- Arrondissement: Pau
- Canton: Terres des Luys et Coteaux du Vic-Bilh
- Intercommunality: Nord-Est Béarn

Government
  - Mayor (2020–2026): Georges Lamazere
- Area^{1}: 7.90 km^{2} (3.05 sq mi)
- Elevation: 200 m (660 ft)
- Highest elevation: 255 m (837 ft)
- Lowest elevation: 144 m (472 ft)
- Population (2023): 118
  - Density: 14.9/km^{2} (38.7/sq mi)
- Time zone: UTC+01:00 (CET)
  - Summer (DST): UTC+02:00 (CEST)
- INSEE/Postal code: 64196 /64350
- ^{1} French Land Register data, which excludes lakes, ponds, glaciers > 1 km^{2} (0.386 sq mi or 247 acres) and river estuaries.

Crouseilles (French pronunciation: [kʁuzɛj]; Occitan: Croselhas) is a commune in the Pyrénées-Atlantiques department in south-western France.

== See also ==
- Communes of the Pyrénées-Atlantiques department
