= Lahontan, Pyrénées-Atlantiques =

Lahontan
- Commune
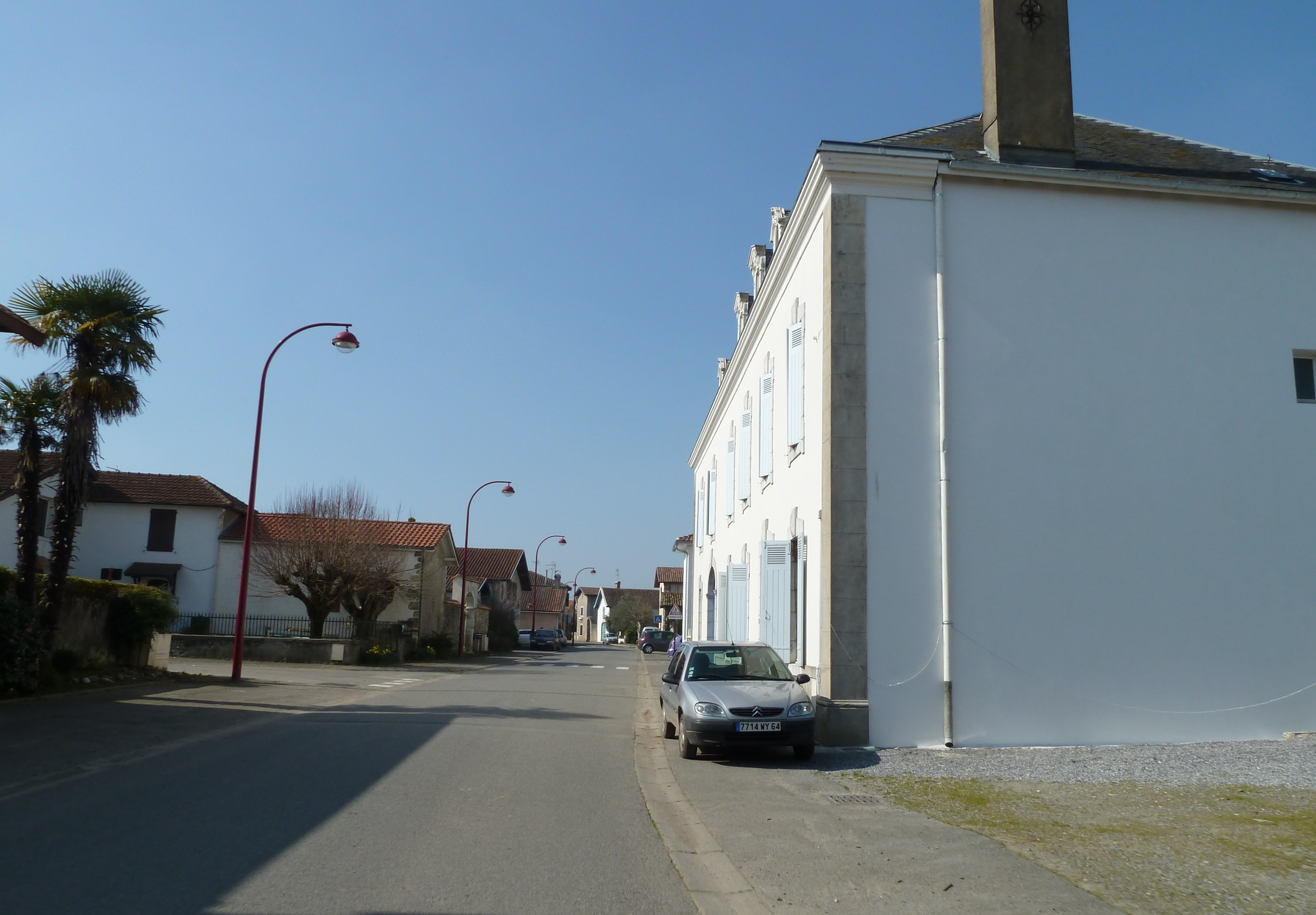
- A general view of Lahontan
- Location of Lahontan
- Location within France Location within Nouvelle-Aquitaine
- Coordinates: 43°31′52″N 0°57′59″W
- Country: France
- Region: Nouvelle-Aquitaine
- Department: Pyrénées-Atlantiques
- Arrondissement: Oloron-Sainte-Marie
- Canton: Orthez et Terres des Gaves et du Sel
- Intercommunality: Béarn des Gaves

Government
  - Mayor (2020–2026): Patrice Lalanne
- Area^{1}: 14.64 km^{2} (5.65 sq mi)
- Elevation: 32 m (105 ft)
- Highest elevation: 149 m (489 ft)
- Lowest elevation: 9 m (30 ft)
- Population (2023): 536
  - Density: 36.6/km^{2} (94.8/sq mi)
- Time zone: UTC+01:00 (CET)
  - Summer (DST): UTC+02:00 (CEST)
- INSEE/Postal code: 64305 /64270
- ^{1} French Land Register data, which excludes lakes, ponds, glaciers > 1 km^{2} (0.386 sq mi or 247 acres) and river estuaries.

Lahontan (French pronunciation: [la.ɔ̃tɑ̃]) is a commune in the Pyrénées-Atlantiques department in south-western France.

== See also ==
- Communes of the Pyrénées-Atlantiques department
