= Séméacq-Blachon =

- Commune
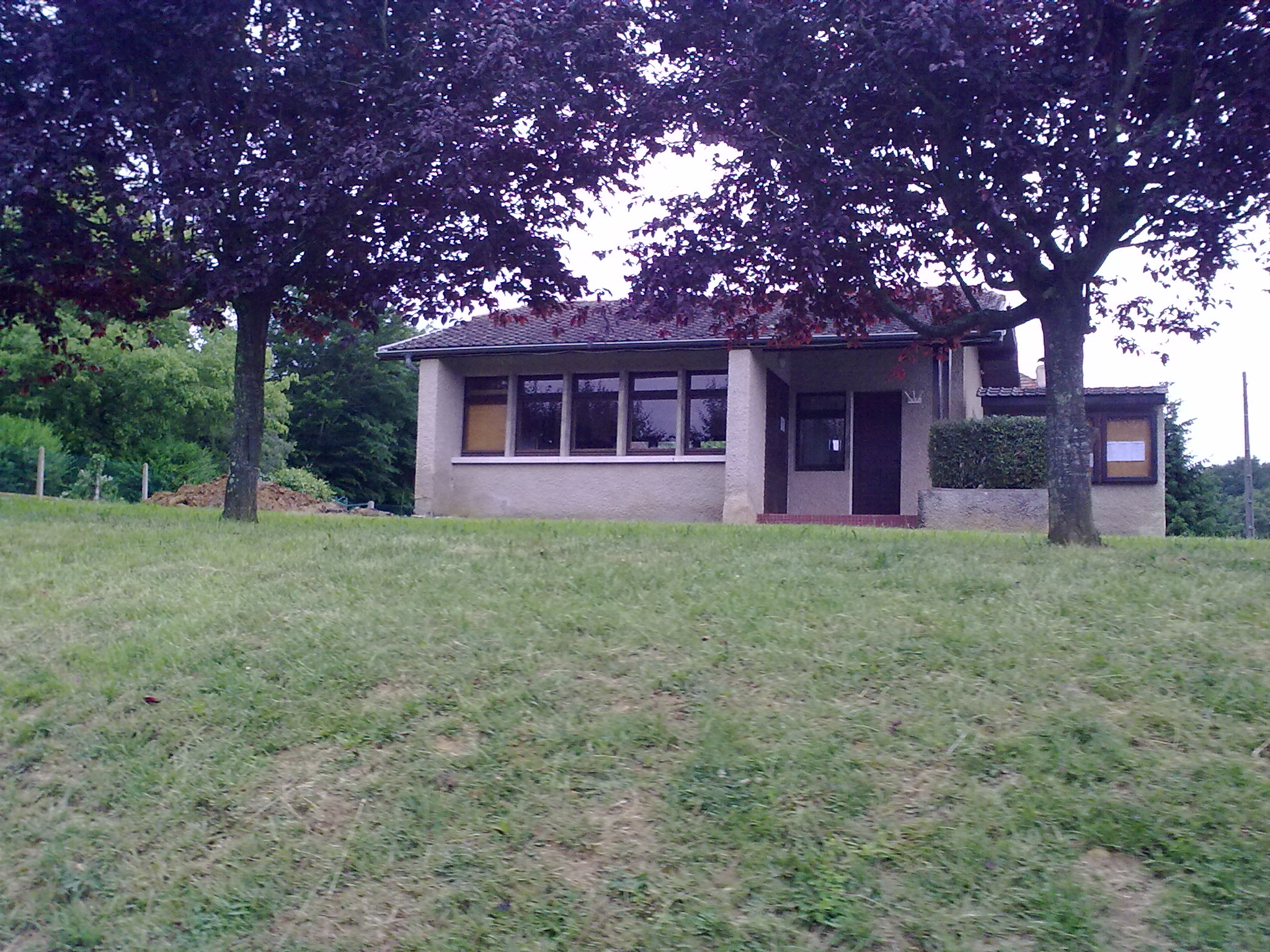
- The town hall of Séméacq-Blachon
- Location of Séméacq-Blachon
- Location within France Location within Nouvelle-Aquitaine
- Coordinates: 43°30′01″N 0°06′39″W
- Country: France
- Region: Nouvelle-Aquitaine
- Department: Pyrénées-Atlantiques
- Arrondissement: Pau
- Canton: Terres des Luys et Coteaux du Vic-Bilh
- Intercommunality: Nord-Est Béarn

Government
  - Mayor (2020–2026): Hélène Desjentils
- Area^{1}: 10.92 km^{2} (4.22 sq mi)
- Elevation: 232 m (761 ft)
- Highest elevation: 298 m (978 ft)
- Lowest elevation: 153 m (502 ft)
- Population (2023): 159
  - Density: 14.6/km^{2} (37.7/sq mi)
- Time zone: UTC+01:00 (CET)
  - Summer (DST): UTC+02:00 (CEST)
- INSEE/Postal code: 64517 /64350
- ^{1} French Land Register data, which excludes lakes, ponds, glaciers > 1 km^{2} (0.386 sq mi or 247 acres) and river estuaries.

Séméacq-Blachon (French pronunciation: [semeak blaʃɔ̃]; Occitan: Semiac e Blaishon) is a commune in the Pyrénées-Atlantiques department in south-western France.

== See also ==
- Communes of the Pyrénées-Atlantiques department
