= Cadillon =

- Commune
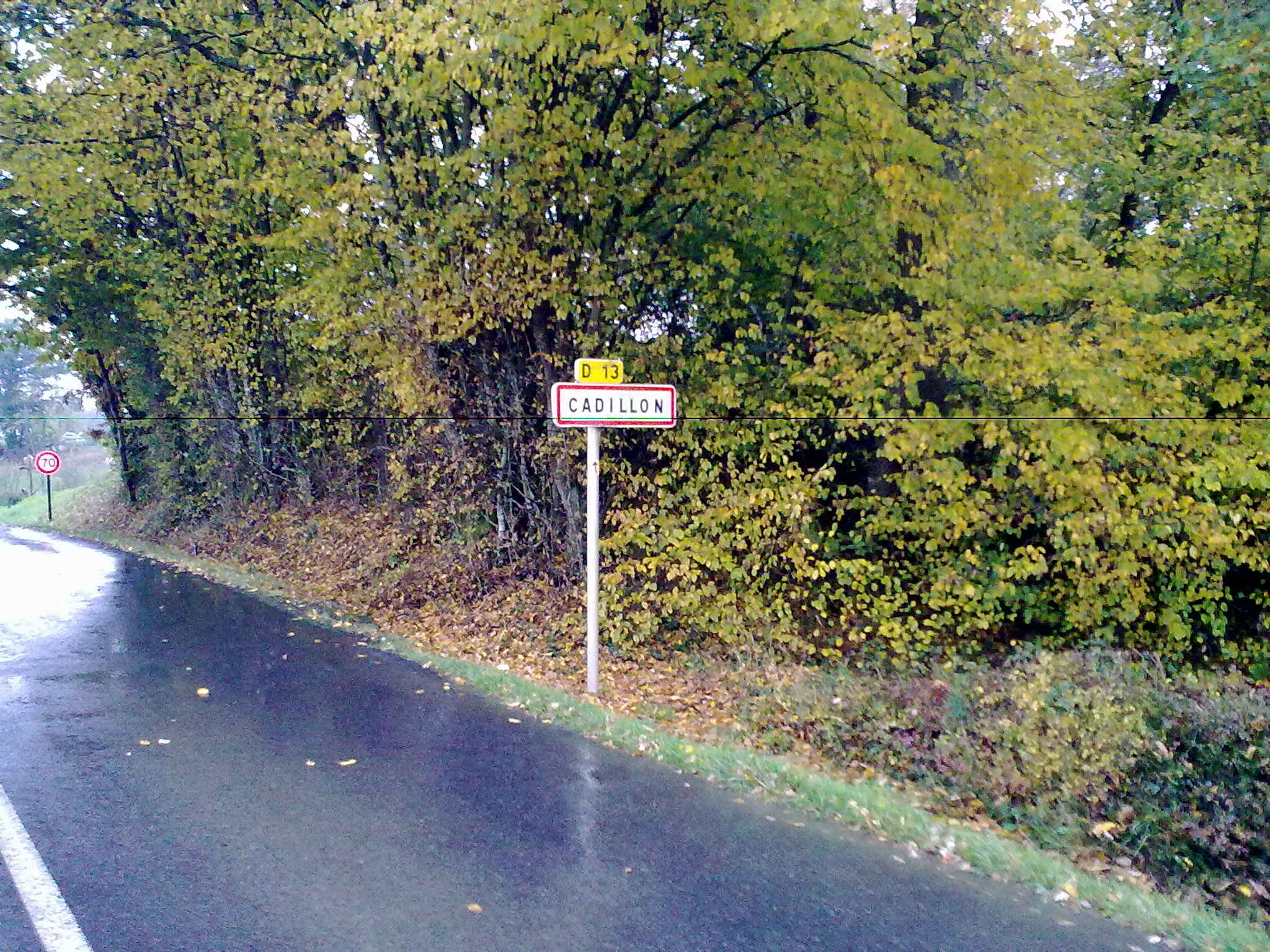
- The road into Cadillon

- Coat of arms
- Location of Cadillon
- Location within France Location within Nouvelle-Aquitaine
- Coordinates: 43°31′41″N 0°09′22″W
- Country: France
- Region: Nouvelle-Aquitaine
- Department: Pyrénées-Atlantiques
- Arrondissement: Pau
- Canton: Terres des Luys et Coteaux du Vic-Bilh
- Intercommunality: Nord-Est Béarn

Government
  - Mayor (2020–2026): Xavier Legrand-Ferronnière
- Area^{1}: 5.37 km^{2} (2.07 sq mi)
- Elevation: 250 m (820 ft)
- Highest elevation: 283 m (928 ft)
- Lowest elevation: 135 m (443 ft)
- Population (2023): 95
  - Density: 18/km^{2} (46/sq mi)
- Time zone: UTC+01:00 (CET)
  - Summer (DST): UTC+02:00 (CEST)
- INSEE/Postal code: 64159 /64330
- ^{1} French Land Register data, which excludes lakes, ponds, glaciers > 1 km^{2} (0.386 sq mi or 247 acres) and river estuaries.

Cadillon (French pronunciation: [kadijɔ̃]; Occitan: Cadilhon) is a commune in the Pyrénées-Atlantiques department in south-western France.

== See also ==
- Communes of the Pyrénées-Atlantiques department
