= Baigts-de-Béarn =

- Commune
- Location of Baigts-de-Béarn
- Location within France Location within Nouvelle-Aquitaine
- Coordinates: 43°30′46″N 0°50′14″W
- Country: France
- Region: Nouvelle-Aquitaine
- Department: Pyrénées-Atlantiques
- Arrondissement: Pau
- Canton: Orthez et Terres des Gaves et du Sel
- Intercommunality: Lacq-Orthez

Government
  - Mayor (2020–2026): Guy Pemartin
- Area^{1}: 13.53 km^{2} (5.22 sq mi)
- Elevation: 111 m (364 ft)
- Highest elevation: 167 m (548 ft)
- Lowest elevation: 28 m (92 ft)
- Population (2023): 855
  - Density: 63.2/km^{2} (164/sq mi)
- Time zone: UTC+01:00 (CET)
  - Summer (DST): UTC+02:00 (CEST)
- INSEE/Postal code: 64087 /64300
- ^{1} French Land Register data, which excludes lakes, ponds, glaciers > 1 km^{2} (0.386 sq mi or 247 acres) and river estuaries.

Baigts-de-Béarn (French pronunciation: [batʃ də beaʁn], literally Baigts of Béarn; Occitan: Vaths de Bearn) is a commune in the Pyrénées-Atlantiques department in the Nouvelle-Aquitaine region of south-western France.

== Geography ==
Baigts-de-Béarn is located some 6 km north-west of Orthez and 23 km east of Peyrehorade. The western part of the northern border of the commune is also the departmental border between Pyrénées-Atlantiques and Landes. Access to the commune is by road D817 from Puyoô in the west which passes through the south of the commune and the village and continues south-east to Orthez. The D415 (the old Route Imperiale) branches from the D817 west of the commune and passes through the village before continuing east to Orthez. The D315 goes north from the village then east to Saint-Boès. The D915 goes north from the D315 to Saint-Girons-en-Béarn. The A64 autoroute passes through the southern tip of the commune but there is no exit with the nearest exit being Exit some 3 km west of the commune. The commune is mostly farmland with scattered forests.

The Gave de Pau forms the southern border of the commune as it flows west to join the Gave d'Oloron at Peyrehorade. Numerous streams rise in the commune and flow south to join the Gave de Pau including the Ruisseau de Montlong. The Ruisseau de Lataillade forms the northern border of the commune as it flows west and forms part of the departmental border with Landes before joining the Gave de Pau west of Puyoô. The Arriou de Bardj rises in the north of the commune and flows west then south to join the Gave de Pau east of Ramous.

=== Places and hamlets ===
- Arritor
- Balagué
- Barroumères
- Bassot
- Bellevue (château)
- Bergeras
- Bernet
- Bizens
- Bordenave
- Bourdieu
- Brana
- Brau
- Capdebielle
- Cassecour
- Castéra
- Castillon
- Caubraque
- Caupet
- Cossou
- Cuyoula
- Domblides
- Fayet
- Gassiou
- Gayou
- Les Glycines
- Grihou
- Hau
- Hourquebie
- Hourquérou
- Hourquet
- Hours
- Labasse
- Labiste
- Laborde
- Laboudigue
- Lacabanne
- Lacarrère
- Lacrouts
- Lagouarde
- Lagourque
- Lahéouguère
- Lalanne
- Lanuque
- Latéoulère
- Laulhé
- Loustaunau
- Luns
- Martimour
- Mongay
- Mousquès
- Panaut
- Parrabéou
- Pédeboscq
- Petit
- Peyrou
- Pierroulin
- Pitche
- Planté
- Pommes
- Poublan
- Pourret
- Régis
- Rey
- Riche
- Saint-Laurent
- Sére
- Temple
- Tilhète
- Toucayré
- Touriangle (château)

== Toponymy ==
The commune name in béarnais is Vaths de Bearn.

The name Baigts means "valley" in Gascon but, according to Michel Grosclaude that meaning is to be avoided. According to him Baigts comes from the Gascon vaths which is derived from vallis meaning "hollow" or "depression" or from vallum meaning "palisade" or "entrenchment". In the old village there is a Rue de l'Embarrat meaning "fortified redoubt".

The following table details the origins of the commune name and other names in the commune.

Name	Spelling	Date	Source	Page	Origin	Description
Baigts	Baigs	13th century	Raymond	19	Fors de Béarn	Village
	Baigx	1318	Raymond	19	Béarn	
	Bags	1343	Raymond	19	Béarn	
	Bachs	1505	Raymond	19	Garos	
	Batz	1540	Raymond	19	Reformation	
	Vagtz	1548	Raymond	19	Reformation	
	Baitz	1582	Raymond	19	Alienations	
	Baigts	1750	Cassini			
Baziart	Bessiart	1540	Raymond	25	Reformation	Farm
Brau	Lo Brau	1540	Raymond	36	Reformation	Farm
	Braü	1863	Raymond	36		
Castillon	Castelhoo-Susoo	1385	Raymond	46	Census	Fief, vassal of the Viscounts of Béarn
	Castilhon	1682	Raymond	46	Reformation	
Labasse	La Basse	1540	Raymond	87	Reformation	Farm
Lacoumayou	Cau-Mayor	1385	Raymond	89	Census	Farm
	La Caumayo	1540	Raymond		Reformation	
Le Petit-Hameau	Le Petit-Hameau	1863	Raymond	75		Hamlet
Portes	Portes	1385	Raymond	138	Census	Fief, vassal of the Viscounts of Béarn and dependent on the bailiwick of Rivière-Gave
	Portas de Bags	1538	Raymond	138	Reformation	
Turon de Castéra	Le Touron de Castéra	1675	Raymond	169	Reformation	Moor

Sources:

- Raymond: Topographic Dictionary of the Department of Basses-Pyrenees, 1863, on the page numbers indicated in the table. (in French)
- Cassini: Cassini Map from 1750

Origins:

- Fors de Béarn
- Béarn: Titles of Béarn,
- Garos: Notaries of Garos
- Reformation: Reformation of Béarn
- Alienations: Alienations of the Diocese of Dax
- Census: Census of Béarn

== History ==
Paul Raymond noted on page 19 of his 1863 dictionary that the commune depended on the Diocese of Dax and was the capital of the Notary of Rivière-Gave, the name of an arch-priesthood of the diocese of Dax which gave its name to the Gave de Pau. In 1385 the commune had 59 fires.

== Administration ==
List of Successive Mayors

From	To	Name
1995	2014	Christian Palette
2014	2026	Guy Pemartin

=== Inter-communality ===
The commune is part of three inter-communal structures:

- the Communauté de communes de Lacq-Orthez;
- the water and sanitation association of Trois Cantons;
- the Energy association of Pyrénées-Atlantiques;

== Demography ==
The inhabitants of the commune are known as Batchois or Batchoises in French.

Historical population

Year	Pop.	±% p.a.
1793	935	—
1800	934	−0.02%
1806	995	+1.06%
1821	1,033	+0.25%
1831	995	−0.37%
1836	980	−0.30%
1841	1,000	+0.40%
1846	1,028	+0.55%
1851	1,003	−0.49%
1856	1,010	+0.14%
1861	1,001	−0.18%
1866	1,003	+0.04%
1872	905	−1.70%
1876	893	−0.33%
1881	913	+0.44%
1886	913	+0.00%
1891	866	−1.05%
1896	830	−0.85%
1901	849	+0.45%

Year	Pop.	±% p.a.
1906	848	−0.02%
1911	806	−1.01%
1921	743	−0.81%
1926	735	−0.22%
1931	690	−1.26%
1936	641	−1.46%
1946	623	−0.28%
1954	576	−0.98%
1962	633	+1.19%
1968	621	−0.32%
1975	677	+1.24%
1982	744	+1.36%
1990	777	+0.54%
1999	739	−0.56%
2007	799	+0.98%
2012	824	+0.62%
2017	876	+1.23%
2023	855	−0.40%

Source: EHESS and INSEE

== Economy ==
In addition to an economy focused on agriculture (livestock and corn), the commune has a hydroelectric plant.

The commune is part of the appellation d'origine contrôlée (AOC) zone of Béarn.

== Culture and heritage ==
=== Civil heritage ===
- The Chateau of Bellevue is a nursing home for disabled workers.

=== Religious heritage ===
- The Parish Church of Saint Vincent and Saint Bartholomew (17th century) is registered as an historical monument.

== Facilities ==
The commune has a primary school.

== See also ==
- Communes of the Pyrénées-Atlantiques department
