= Auterrive =

- Commune
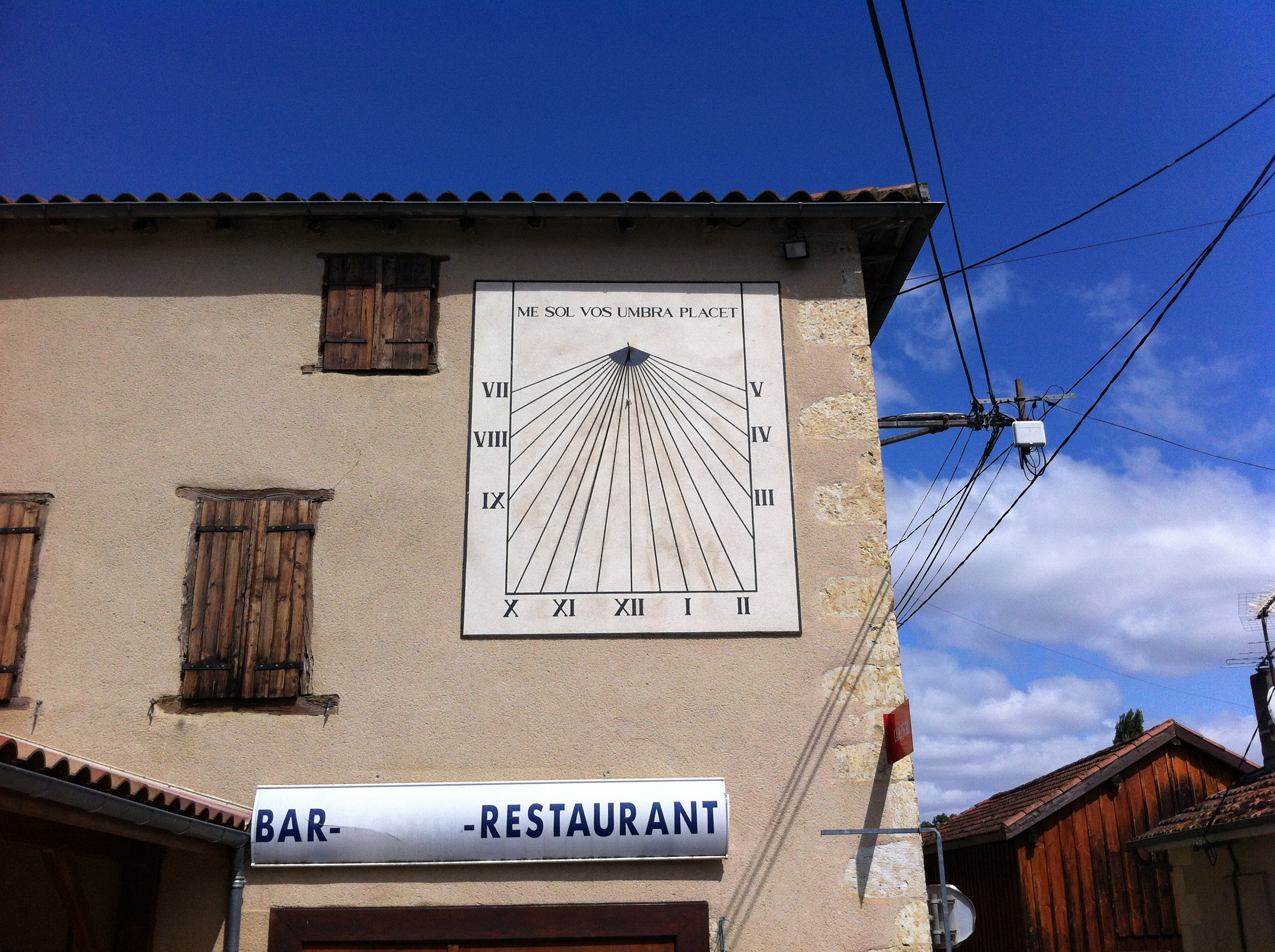
- A solar clock face at Auterrive

- Coat of arms
- Location of Auterrive
- Location within France Location within Nouvelle-Aquitaine
- Coordinates: 43°28′02″N 0°59′51″W
- Country: France
- Region: Nouvelle-Aquitaine
- Department: Pyrénées-Atlantiques
- Arrondissement: Oloron-Sainte-Marie
- Canton: Orthez et Terres des Gaves et du Sel
- Intercommunality: CC Béarn Gaves

Government
  - Mayor (2020–2026): Philippe Labache
- Area^{1}: 3.08 km^{2} (1.19 sq mi)
- Elevation: 22 m (72 ft)
- Highest elevation: 35 m (115 ft)
- Lowest elevation: 16 m (52 ft)
- Population (2023): 143
  - Density: 46.4/km^{2} (120/sq mi)
- Time zone: UTC+01:00 (CET)
  - Summer (DST): UTC+02:00 (CEST)
- INSEE/Postal code: 64082 /64270
- ^{1} French Land Register data, which excludes lakes, ponds, glaciers > 1 km^{2} (0.386 sq mi or 247 acres) and river estuaries.

Auterrive (French pronunciation: [otʁiv]; Occitan: Autarriba) is a commune in the Pyrénées-Atlantiques department in the Nouvelle-Aquitaine region of south-western France.

== Geography ==
Auterrive is located some 14 km south-east of Peyrehorade and 7 km west of Salies-de-Béarn. Access to the commune is by the D29 road from Carresse-Cassaber in the north which passes just west of the village and continues south-west to Labastide-Villefranche. Access to the village is by local roads connecting to the D29. The D28 road goes south from Saint-Dos through the west of the commune and continues to Escos in the south. The D277 goes from the D29 just west to the village west of Saint-Dos. Apart from forest along the river bank and some small forests in the west of the commune the land is all farmland.

Auterrive is a Gascon village, which fully depended on Dax and is nowhere mentioned as Bearnais. Paul Raymond reported a record from 1675 when the village was referred to as Autarrive en France. Pierre-Tucoo Chala indicated a peculiarity concerning Carresse-Cassaber: the Auterrive bridge is not on the border but Gascony had a bridgehead on the right bank of the Gave d'Oloron on what is now the territory of the Béarnais village of Carresse. This area did not touch the river at the bridge and purists could say that the béarnais commune of today has incorporated a few hectares of Gascon land.

The commune is in the drainage basin of the Adour. The area east of the village is an island enclosed by a loop of the Gave d'Oloron and a stream which crosses the loop (although the Gave d'Oloron is not the border of the commune).

=== Places and hamlets ===
- Boucau
- Le Désert
- Dumirail
- Durancou
- Labarthe
- Lahosse
- Larribère (Mill)
- Maysonnave
- Minoterie
- Noutary
- Terrenabe

== Toponymy ==
The commune name in béarnais is Autarriba. For Michel Grosclaude the origin of the name is unquestionably Gascon, auta arriba from the Latin alta ripa meaning "high river".

The following table details the origins of the commune name and other names in the commune.

| Name | Spelling | Date | Source | Page | Origin | Description |
|---|---|---|---|---|---|---|
| Auterrive | Autarribe | 13th century | Raymond | 17 | Bayonne | Village |
| | Autaribe | 1360 | Raymond | 17 | Came | |
| | Sent-Miqueu d'Autarribe | 1442 | Raymond | 17 | Notaries | |
| | Autarrive en France | 1675 | Raymond | 17 | Reformation | |
| | Hauterive | 1750 | Cassini | | | |
| Dumirail | Dumirail | 1863 | Raymond | 57 | | Hamlet and Lake |

Sources:

- Raymond: Topographic Dictionary of the Department of Basses-Pyrenees, 1863, on the page numbers indicated in the table. (in French)
- Grosclaude: Toponymic Dictionary of communes, Béarn, 2006 (in French)
- Cassini: Cassini Map from 1750

Origins:

- Bayonne: Cartulary of Bayonne or Livre d'Or (Book of Gold)
- Came: Titles of Came
- Notaries: Notaries of Labastide-Villefranche
- Reformation: Reformation of Béarn

== History ==
Paul Raymond noted on page 17 of his 1863 dictionary that Auterrive depended on the sub-delegation of Dax.

=== Heraldry ===
| Arms of Auterrive | Auterrive depicts a Jay in the arms to symbolize the defensive site of Barry. The Jay is reputed to give an alarm when an intruder enters a wood. Blazon: Quarterly, at 1 and 4 Gules, a Jay in flight of Argent; at 2 and 3 Argent, a lion of Gules. |

== Administration ==
List of Successive Mayors

| From | To | Name |
|---|---|---|
| 1995 | 2014 | Josette de Caumia-Baillenx |
| 2014 | 2026 | Philippe Labache |

=== Inter-communality ===
The commune is part of seven inter-communal structures:

- the Communauté de communes du Béarn des Gaves;
- the SIGOM;
- the SIVU of five villages;
- the SIVU for educational regrouping of Léren, Saint-Pé-de-Léren, Saint-Dos et Auterrive;
- the Energy association of Pyrénées-Atlantiques;
- the inter-communal association for the management of drinking water from the Saleys and its Gaves;
- the inter-communal association for Gaves and the Saleys;

== Demography ==
The inhabitants of the commune are known as Auterriverains or Auterriveraines in French.

Historical population

| Year | Pop. | ±% p.a. |
|---|---|---|
| 1793 | 245 | — |
| 1821 | 298 | +0.70% |
| 1846 | 313 | +0.20% |
| 1872 | 309 | −0.05% |
| 1901 | 240 | −0.87% |
| 1926 | 202 | −0.69% |
| 1946 | 226 | +0.56% |
| 1962 | 195 | −0.92% |
| 1968 | 195 | +0.00% |

| Year | Pop. | ±% p.a. |
|---|---|---|
| 1975 | 163 | −2.53% |
| 1982 | 151 | −1.09% |
| 1990 | 146 | −0.42% |
| 1999 | 137 | −0.70% |
| 2007 | 129 | −0.75% |
| 2012 | 118 | −1.77% |
| 2017 | 130 | +1.96% |
| 2023 | 143 | +1.60% |

Source: EHESS and INSEE

== Economy ==
The commune is part of the Appellation d'origine contrôlée (AOC) zone of Ossau-iraty.

== Culture and Heritage ==
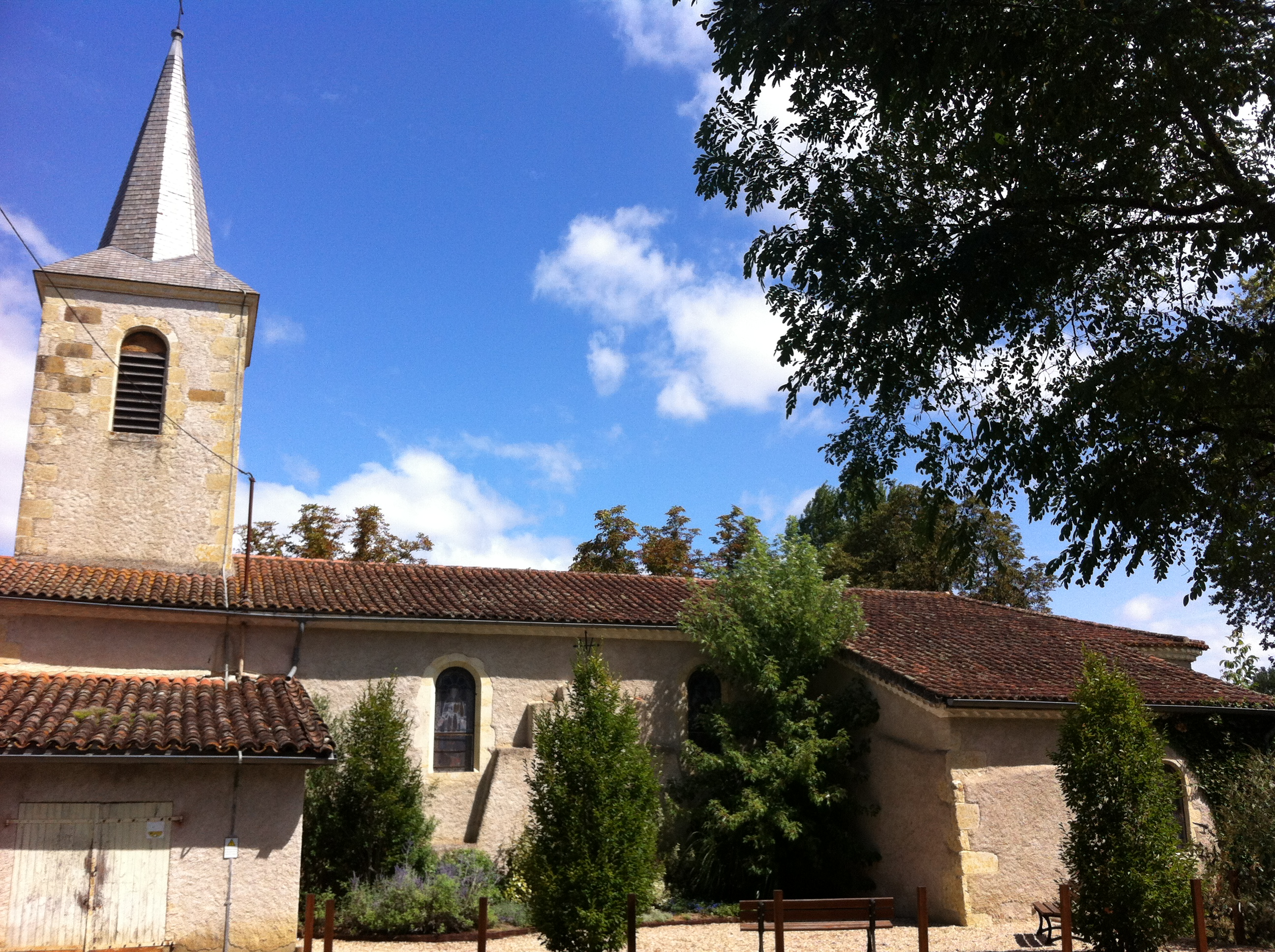
Auterrive church

=== Civil heritage ===
- At the foot of the Gave there is the Barry fortress which was an observation and border post between Navarre, Béarn, and Gascony. This small enclosure had a garrison of three soldiers until 1682. The currently existing ruins, although based on much older foundations, seem to date back to the Hundred Years War when Auterrive was occupied by the English and attached to the Seneschal of Hastings.
- The Maisonnabe House in the Mirails district dates to 1661;
- The Pouey House is an old manor house of justice
- The Hau House is a former dependency of the Abbey of Sorde.

There is a small enamelled plate which says "June 1875" that recalls the flood which swept away the village bridge killing two people in that year.

=== Religious heritage ===
- The Church dates from the 16th century.
- There are several Calvaries including a cross of Saint-Michel which formerly marked the boundaries of the Abbey of Sorde.
- There was a Chapel in the Mirails district which was recently destroyed.

=== Environmental heritage ===
- Lake Dumirail is south-west of the commune.

== Amenities ==
There is a holiday and leisure centre at Auterrive (Les Francas).

== Notable people linked to the commune ==
- The Marquise de Montehermoso (1784 to 1869), born Countess Maria-Pilar d'Acedo, Countess of Echauz, widow of the Marquis of the same name and mistress of Joseph Bonaparte, King of Spain, married in the village to Amédée of Carabène, the holder of numerous French and foreign decorations, future general counsel and senior officer of the Napoleonic campaigns. She was also the owner of Barry, the fortified site in the village.

== See also ==
- Communes of the Pyrénées-Atlantiques department

=== Bibliography ===
- Alexis Ichas, History of Auterrive - Vols. I & II, Éditions Atlantica (in French)
- Alexis Ichas, History of gaves, Éditions Atlantica (in French)
- Alexis Ichas, Béarnais Chronicles of gave and the Saleys, Éditions Atlantica, 2006 (in French)
