= Laàs =

- Commune
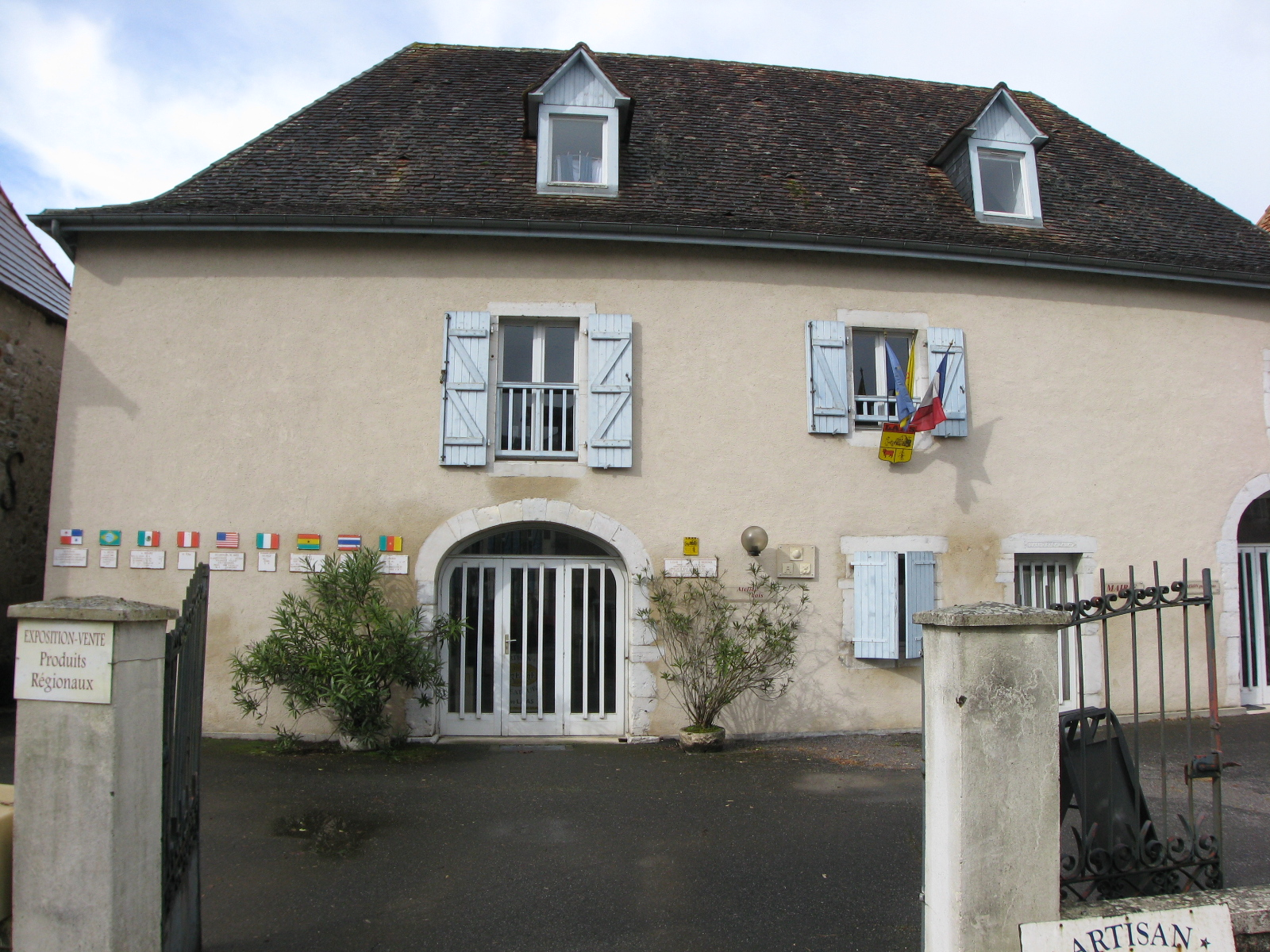
- The town hall of Laàs

- Coat of arms
- Location of Laàs
- Location within France Location within Nouvelle-Aquitaine
- Coordinates: 43°22′57″N 0°51′00″W
- Country: France
- Region: Nouvelle-Aquitaine
- Department: Pyrénées-Atlantiques
- Arrondissement: Oloron-Sainte-Marie
- Canton: Orthez et Terres des Gaves et du Sel

Government
  - Mayor (2020–2026): Jacques Pedehontaa
- Area^{1}: 6.46 km^{2} (2.49 sq mi)
- Elevation: 142 m (466 ft)
- Highest elevation: 235 m (771 ft)
- Lowest elevation: 63 m (207 ft)
- Population (2023): 140
  - Density: 22/km^{2} (56/sq mi)
- Time zone: UTC+01:00 (CET)
  - Summer (DST): UTC+02:00 (CEST)
- INSEE/Postal code: 64287 /64390
- ^{1} French Land Register data, which excludes lakes, ponds, glaciers > 1 km^{2} (0.386 sq mi or 247 acres) and river estuaries.

Laàs (French pronunciation: [las]; Occitan: Lars, [laɾs]) is a commune in the department of Pyrénées-Atlantiques, in the region of Nouvelle-Aquitaine, southwestern France.

Neighbouring villages include Orriule to the north, Andrein to the north-west, Narp to the east, Barraute-Camu to the west, and Montfort to the south.

The town is notable for its self-declared secession from France as the Principality of Laàs en Béarn.

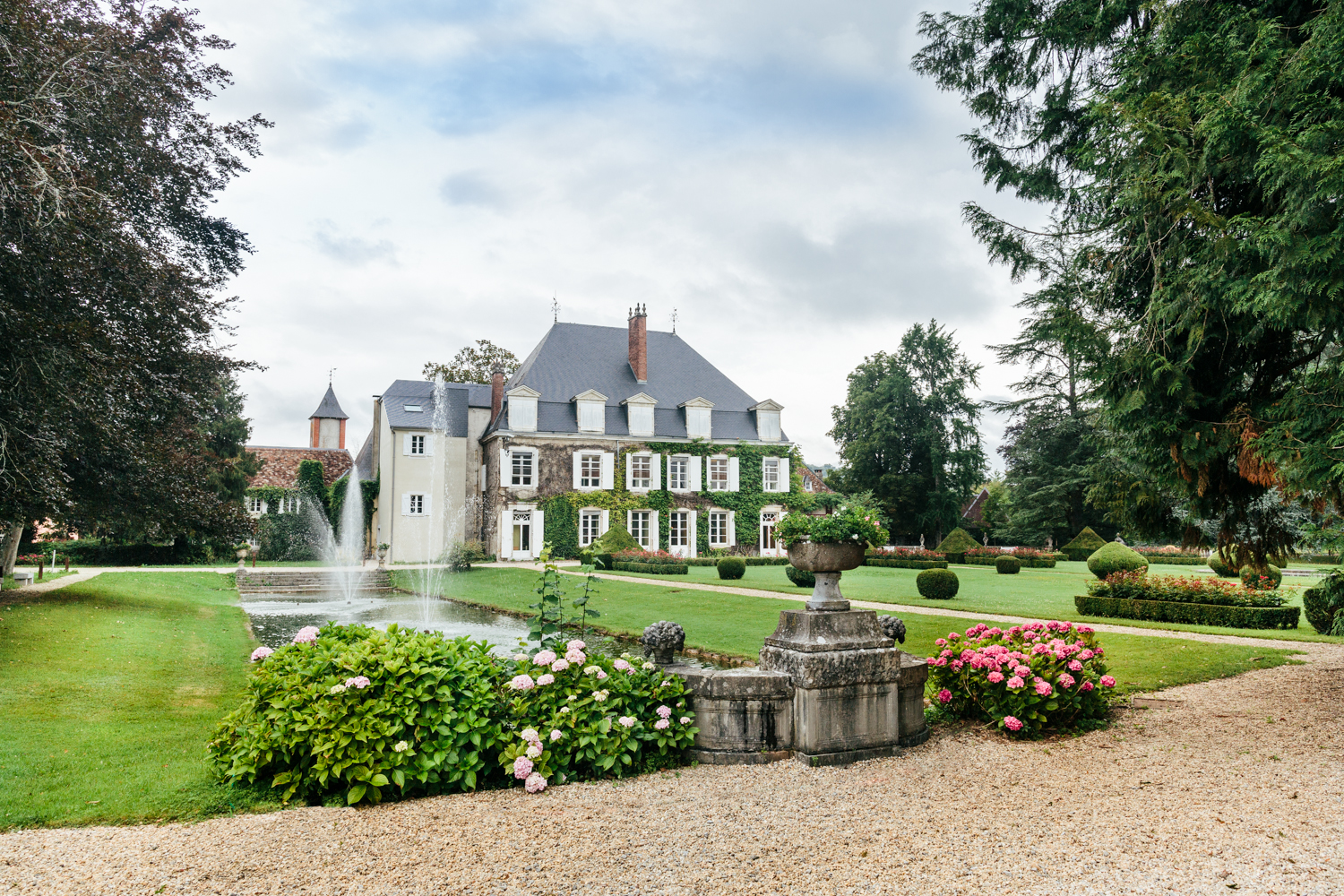
Le Château de Laàs

== Principality of Laàs ==
The Principality of Laàs en Béarn is an initiative of the mayor of Laàs, Jacques Pédehontaà. He first proposed the idea in August 2011 to protest against the administrative reforms of the French government.

As of May 2014, the principality is registered as a non-profit association in the Prefecture of Pau. In August 2014, it presented three animation projects, including a Hollywood Walk of Fame-like boulevard.

The Principality officially declared its independence on 1 January 2015.

Original flag of the Principality of Laàs

== See also ==
- Communes of the Pyrénées-Atlantiques department
