= Andrein =

- Commune
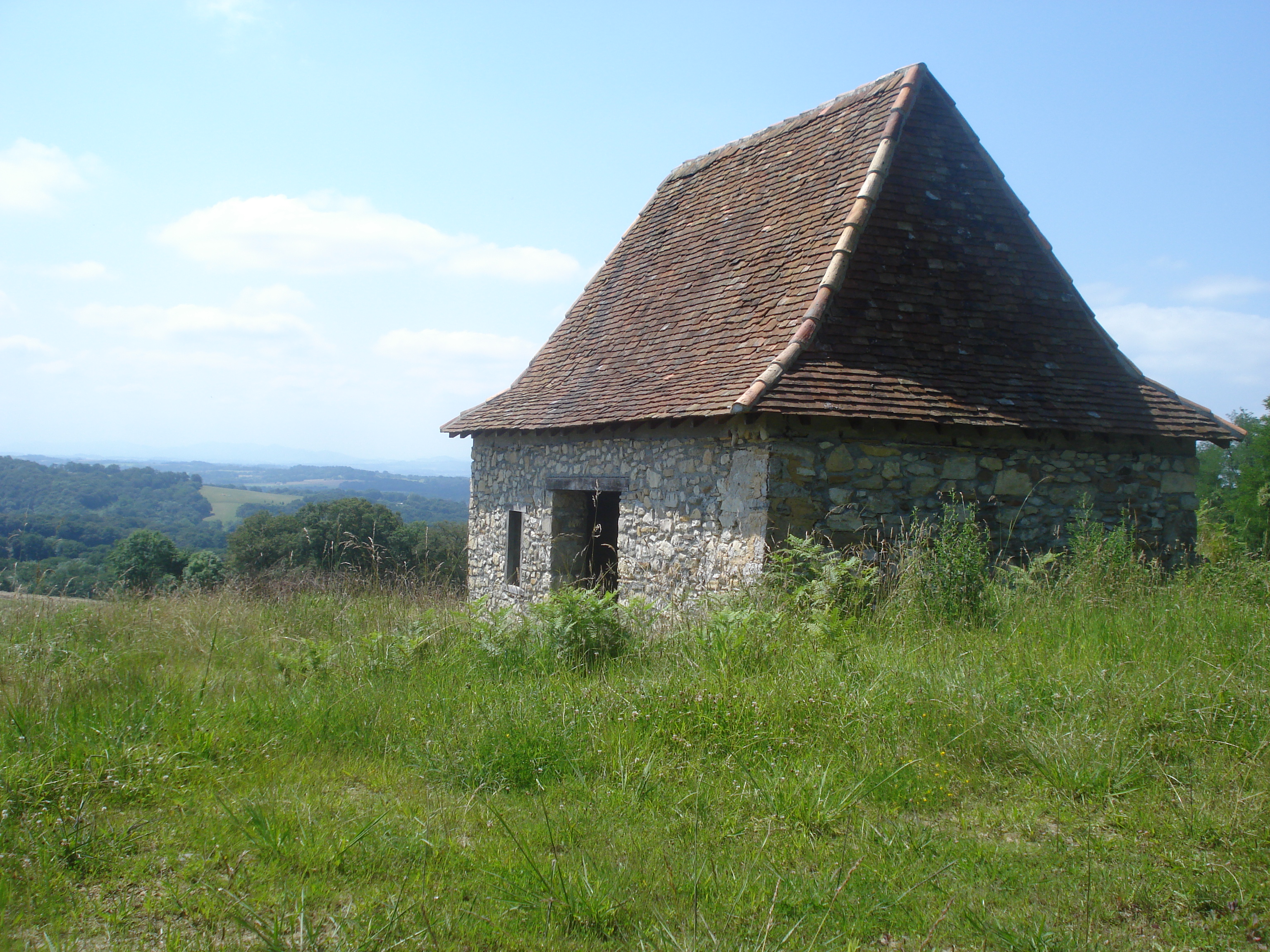
- Landscape of Andrein and the Valley of the Gave d'Oloron
- Location of Andrein
- Location within France Location within Nouvelle-Aquitaine
- Coordinates: 43°23′36″N 0°53′59″W
- Country: France
- Region: Nouvelle-Aquitaine
- Department: Pyrénées-Atlantiques
- Arrondissement: Oloron-Sainte-Marie
- Canton: Orthez et Terres des Gaves et du Sel
- Intercommunality: Béarn des Gaves

Government
  - Mayor (2020–2026): Alain Martin
- Area^{1}: 7.80 km^{2} (3.01 sq mi)
- Elevation: 74 m (243 ft)
- Highest elevation: 221 m (725 ft)
- Lowest elevation: 57 m (187 ft)
- Population (2023): 136
  - Density: 17.4/km^{2} (45.2/sq mi)
- Time zone: UTC+01:00 (CET)
  - Summer (DST): UTC+02:00 (CEST)
- INSEE/Postal code: 64022 /64390
- ^{1} French Land Register data, which excludes lakes, ponds, glaciers > 1 km^{2} (0.386 sq mi or 247 acres) and river estuaries.

Andrein (French pronunciation: [ɑ̃dʁɛ̃]; Occitan: Andrenh) is a commune in the Pyrénées-Atlantiques department in the Nouvelle-Aquitaine region of south-western France.

== Geography ==
=== Location ===
Andrein is a béarnaise commune located on the left bank of the Gave d'Oloron 5 kilometres east of Sauveterre-de-Béarn and some 16 km south-west of Orthez. Access to the commune is by road D27 from Sauveterre-de-Bearn passing through the commune and the village and continuing east to Laàs. The D23 road from Burgaronne to L'Hôpital-d'Orion also passes through the north of the commune. The commune is mixed forest and farmland.

=== Hydrography ===
Located in the Drainage basin of the Adour, the southern border of the commune is formed by the Gave d'Oloron. Numerous streams flow south through the commune to the Gave d'Oloron including the Malourau and the Lourou which forms the eastern border. The northern border is formed by the Arrec Heurre which flows west to eventually join the Gave d'Oleron east of Abitain.

=== Localities and hamlets ===
- Araspy
- Arrouzère
- Bachoué Château
- Baillenx
- Balespet
- La Baronnie
- Bétouzet
- Bonnemaison
- Bordenave (2 places)
- Braile
- Les Camous
- Casamayou
- Castagnède
- Casteret
- Charrie
- Cousté
- Esploubet
- Hieyte
- Hourcade
- Hourquet
- Laborde
- Lagouarde
- Lauga
- Lée
- Louhau
- Lourou
- Loustau
- Maysonnave
- Monplaisir
- Moulinau
- Pellou
- Pouyau
- Quartier de Pouyau
- La Salle
- Sarrail
- Suberborde
- Temboury
- Téoulé
- Tinguerot
- Touroun.

== Toponymy ==
The commune name in Béarnese dialect and in Gascon Occitan is Andrenh. Brigitte Jobbé-Duval indicated that the name actually came from the family name Andréas with the suffix -enh. She also mentioned that the villagers were once called "cherry eaters".

The following table details the origins of the commune name and other names in the commune.

Name	Spelling	Date	Source	Page	Origin	Description
Andrein	Andrenh	1385	Raymond	6	Census	Village
	Andreinh	1544	Raymond	6	Reformation	
	Sanctus Petrus d'Andrein	1674	Raymond	6	Insinuations	
Araspy	Araspin	1385	Raymond	8	Census	Farm
	Araspin de haut	1614	Raymond	8	Reformation	
	Araspin de baig	1614	Raymond	8	Reformation	
Arrouzère	Arrosere	1385	Raymond	13	Census	Farm
	Arrozere	1391	Raymond	13	Navarrenx	
Bachoué	Bachoué	1641	Raymond	18	Reformation	Fief, vassal of the Viscounts of Béarn
Bétouzet	Bétouzet	1611	Raymond	30		Fief, vassal of the Viscounts of Béarn
Carjuzan	Carjuzan		Raymond	41		Barony, subject to the Viscounts of Béarn
Charrie	L'ostau de Xarre	1385	Raymond	48	Census	Farm
	Charrie	1614	Raymond	48	Reformation	
	Charie	1863	Raymond	48		
Espiubeg	Espiubeig	1780	Raymond	61	Denombrement	Place
	Espiubeigt	1780	Raymond	61	Denombrement	
Larsun	Larsuno	1540	Raymond	95	Reformation	Hamlet
Lauga	Lauga	1728	Raymond	96	Denombrement	Fief, vassal of the Viscounts of Béarn
Le Poey	Le Poey	1863	Raymond	136		Place
Sahores	Saƒores	1397	Raymond	145	Navarrenx	Farm
La Salle	La Sale d'Andrenh	1385	Raymond	154	Census	Fief, vassal of the Viscounts of Béarn, subject to the bailiwick of Sauveterre
	La Sala d'Andrenh	1538	Raymond	154	Reformation	
Touroun	La maison noble du Touron	1728	Raymond	169	Denombrement	Fief
	Le Turon	1863	Raymond	169		

Sources:

- Raymond: Topographic Dictionary of the Department of Basses-Pyrenees, 1863, on the page numbers indicated in the table. (in French)

Origins:

- Census: Census of Béarn
- Reformation: Reformation of Béarn
- Insinuations: Insinuations of the Diocese of Oloron
- Navarrenx: Notaries of Navarrenx
- Denombrement: Denombremont of Andrein

== History ==
Paul Raymond on page 6 of his 1863 dictionary noted that the commune had a Lay Abbey, a vassal of the Viscounts of Béarn.

In 1385 Andrein reported 17 fires and depended on the bailiwick of Sauveterre.

== Administration ==
List of Successive Mayors

From	To	Name
1995	2026	Alain Martin

=== Inter-communality ===
The commune is part of five intercommunal structures:

- the inter-communal centre for Social Action of Sauveterre-de-Béarn;
- the Communauté de communes du Béarn des Gaves;
- the inter-communal association for the Gaves and of Saleys;
- the AEP association for the Saleys region;
- the energy association for Pyrénées-Atlantiques

== Demography ==
The inhabitants of the commune are known as Andreinais or Andreinaises in French.

Historical population

Year	Pop.	±% p.a.
1793	378	—
1821	271	−1.18%
1846	364	+1.19%
1872	289	−0.88%
1901	268	−0.26%
1926	212	−0.93%
1946	184	−0.71%
1954	142	−3.19%
1962	111	−3.03%

Year	Pop.	±% p.a.
1968	110	−0.15%
1975	99	−1.49%
1982	105	+0.84%
1990	103	−0.24%
1999	111	+0.83%
2007	129	+1.90%
2012	135	+0.91%
2017	131	−0.60%
2023	136	+0.63%

Source: EHESS and INSEE

== Economy ==
Economic activity is mainly agricultural. The town is part of the Appellation d'origine contrôlée (AOC) zone of Ossau-iraty.

== Culture and Heritage ==
=== Environmental heritage ===
The Touron de Larochelle is 195 metres high.

== Notable people linked to the commune ==
- Emmanuel Berl, born 2 August 1892 in Vésinet (Seine-et-Oise) and died 21 September 1976 in Paris, was a journalist, historian and French essayist. In 1920 he married Jacqueline Bordes in Andrein.
- Arthur Hugenschmidt (1862–1929) stayed in Andein in 1928 and 1929 with the Countess of Viforano (daughter of Dr. Joseph Marie Alfred Beni-Barde) according to correspondence from the Presidency of the Republic.

== See also ==
- Communes of the Pyrénées-Atlantiques department
