= Lanneplaà =

- Commune
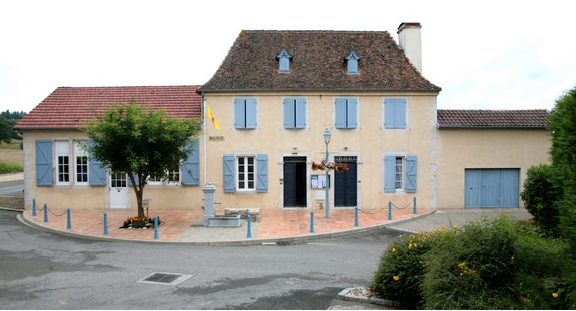
- Town hall of Lanneplaà.
- Location of Lanneplaà
- Location within France Location within Nouvelle-Aquitaine
- Coordinates: 43°27′45″N 0°49′11″W
- Country: France
- Region: Nouvelle-Aquitaine
- Department: Pyrénées-Atlantiques
- Arrondissement: Pau
- Canton: Orthez et Terres des Gaves et du Sel
- Intercommunality: Lacq-Orthez

Government
  - Mayor (2020–2026): Pierre Ziegler
- Area^{1}: 7.26 km^{2} (2.80 sq mi)
- Elevation: 90 m (300 ft)
- Highest elevation: 207 m (679 ft)
- Lowest elevation: 70 m (230 ft)
- Population (2023): 301
  - Density: 41.5/km^{2} (107/sq mi)
- Time zone: UTC+01:00 (CET)
  - Summer (DST): UTC+02:00 (CEST)
- INSEE/Postal code: 64312 /64300
- ^{1} French Land Register data, which excludes lakes, ponds, glaciers > 1 km^{2} (0.386 sq mi or 247 acres) and river estuaries.

Lanneplaà (French pronunciation: [lanpla]; Occitan: Lanaplan) is a commune in the Pyrénées-Atlantiques department in south-western France.

== Geography ==
=== Location ===
Lanneplaà is located some 5 km south-west of Orthez.

=== Access ===
Access to the commune is by road D23 from Orthez and by road D267. « Route de Sainte-Suzanne » is another access. The A64 autoroute passes in Orthez the nearest exit being Exit 8 some 9 km north-east of the commune. The commune is mostly farmland with scattered forests.

=== Hydrography ===
The commune is crossed by a tributary of Laà, the stream of Moulins, and a tributaryof Saleys, the arriou of Mondran.

=== Places and hamlets ===
- Baraillot
- Bédat
- Bonnecase
- Bosc
- Bounobre
- Bouzoum
- Bracot
- Cabes
- Cambran
- Camdeborde
- Campagne
- Cassiau
- Cassou
- Caubeigt
- Cossié
- Couyet
- Daban
- Goeytes
- Gréchès
- Hau
- Hittos
- Jannette
- Labièle
- Laborde
- Labourdette
- Lacabane
- Lacoste
- Lahourcade
- Lalanne
- Lasserre
- Laubaret
- Laya
- Montardon
- Moulin (le)
- Payrot
- Peyran
- Peyroulou
- Poey
- Poundic
- Pouquet
- Pourére
- Poursioubes
- Sarrail
- Sarrouille

=== Neighbouring communes and villages ===
- Salles-Mongiscard North at 4.21 km
- Orthez Northeast at 5.03 km
- L'Hôpital-d'Orion Southwest at 3.72 km
- Ozenx-Montestrucq South at 2.88 km

Distances are calculated as the crow flies compared to neighboring villages town halls

== Toponymy ==
The following table details the origins of the commune name.
| Name | Century / year | Source | Origin |
|---|---|---|---|
| Lanepla | 10th century | cartulaire de Sorde / Raymond | |
| Lane-Pla et Lanne-Pla | 1172 | cartulaire de Sorde / Raymond | |
| Laneplan | 1323 | cartulaire d'Orthez / Raymond | |
| Llaneplaa | 1385 | | |
| Lanaplaa | 1536 | Raymond | Béarn |
| Lanaplan | 1538 | Raymond | Béarn |
| Lanneplâa | end 18th century | carte de Cassini / Cassini | |
| Lanneplaa | 1793 | Cassini | |
| Lanneplau | 1801 | Bulletin des lois / Cassini | |
| Lanneplàa | 1863 | Topographical Dictionary Béarn-Pays basque / Raymond | |
| Lanneplaà | | | |

Lanneplaà as for origin the Gascon lana (resulting from the Gaulish language landa, "lande"(moor)) and plana ("plane" ("flat")).

Lanneplaà thus indicates a plain of Meadow.

== History ==
Paul Raymond noted that the municipality had a Lay Abbey, vassal of the Viscounts of Béarn.

On 1385, Lanneplaà depended on the bailiwick of Larbaig and there were 39 fires.

== Administration ==
List of Mayors
| Mayor | Term start | Term end | Party |
|---|---|---|---|
| Jacques Laulhé | 1977 | 2001 | Independent politician |
| Jacques Laulhé | 2001 | 2008 | Independent politician |
| Jacques Laulhé | 2008 | 2014 | Independent politician |
| Aline Langlès | 2014 | 2020 | Independent politician |
| Pierre Ziegler | 2020 | 2026 | |

== Demography ==
The inhabitants of the commune are known as Lanneplanais or Lanneplanaises in French.

== See also ==
- Communes of the Pyrénées-Atlantiques department
