= Barraute-Camu =

- Commune
- Location of Barraute-Camu
- Location within France Location within Nouvelle-Aquitaine
- Coordinates: 43°23′19″N 0°53′42″W
- Country: France
- Region: Nouvelle-Aquitaine
- Department: Pyrénées-Atlantiques
- Arrondissement: Oloron-Sainte-Marie
- Canton: Orthez et Terres des Gaves et du Sel
- Intercommunality: Béarn des Gaves

Government
  - Mayor (2020–2026): Jean Agoutborde
- Area^{1}: 3.94 km^{2} (1.52 sq mi)
- Elevation: 81 m (266 ft)
- Highest elevation: 145 m (476 ft)
- Lowest elevation: 53 m (174 ft)
- Population (2023): 187
  - Density: 47.5/km^{2} (123/sq mi)
- Time zone: UTC+01:00 (CET)
  - Summer (DST): UTC+02:00 (CEST)
- INSEE/Postal code: 64096 /64390
- ^{1} French Land Register data, which excludes lakes, ponds, glaciers > 1 km^{2} (0.386 sq mi or 247 acres) and river estuaries.

Barraute-Camu (French pronunciation: [baʁot kamy]; Occitan: Berrauta e Camun) is a commune of the Pyrénées-Atlantiques department in the Nouvelle-Aquitaine region of south-western France.

== Geography ==
Barraute-Camu is located 2 km east by south-east of Sauveterre-de-Béarn and 4 km west by north-west of Montfort. Access to the commune is by the D936 highway from Abitain in the west which passes through the heart of the commune just south of the village and continues east to Araujuzon. The commune is almost all farmland except for some forest along the river and along the southern border.

The Gave d'Oloron forms the northern border of the commune as it flows west to join the Gave de Pau at Peyrehorade to become the Gaves Réunis. The Ruisseau de Lapeyrère rises in the commune and flows north to join the Gave d'Oloron.

=== Places and hamlets ===
- La Cabé
- Camu
- Campagne de Camu
- Capulet
- Crescent
- Houch
- Lageyre
- Lahitau
- Lasbignasses
- Peyret
- Théas

== Toponymy ==
The commune name in Occitan Gascon is Berrauta-Camun.

Michel Grosclaude said that the name comes from the basque berro: Broussailles and the collective suffix '-eta meaning "where there are no bushes" He also stated that Camu most likely comes from the Gascon kamy, the variant kamu meaning "fertile ground next to the river".

The following table details the origins of the commune name and other names in the commune.

Name	Spelling	Date	Source	Page	Origin	Description
Barraute	Berraute	1150	Grosclaude		Sord	Village
	Berraute	1385	Raymond	21	Census	
	Sent Sapriaa de Berraute	1413	Raymond	21	Notaries	
	Berauta	1548	Raymond	21	Reformation	
	Beraute	1687	Raymond	21	Reformation	
	Barraute	1750	Cassini		Cassini 1750	
	Baraulte	1801	Ldh/EHESS/Cassini			
	Barrante	1801	Ldh/EHESS/Cassini			
Camu	Camoo	1385	Raymond	40	Census	Village
	Camuu	1385	Raymond	40	Census	
	Camur en Bearn	1477	Raymond	40	Ohix	
Les Ahitaux	Les Ahitaux	1863	Raymond	3		Hamlet

Sources:

- Grosclaude: Toponymic Dictionary of communes, Béarn, 2006 (in French)
- Raymond: Topographic Dictionary of the Department of Basses-Pyrenees, 1863, on the page numbers indicated in the table. (in French)
- Cassini: 1750 Cassini Map
- Ldh/EHESS/Cassini: Des villages de Cassini aux communes d'aujourd'hui: Commune data sheet Barraute-Camu, EHESS (in French).

Origins:

- Sorde: Cartulary of Sorde
- Census: Census of Béarn
- Notaries: Notaries of Navarrenx
- Reformation: Reformation of Béarn
- Ohix: Contracts retained by Ohix, Notary of Soule

== History ==
Barraute appears as Barraute on the 1750 Cassini Map and the same on the 1790 version.

Camu appears as Camu on the 1750 Cassini Map and does not appear on the 1790 version.

Paul Raymond noted on page 21 and 40 of his 1863 dictionary that in 1385 Barraute had 24 fires and Camu 11. Barraute was part of the bailiwick of Navarrenx and Camu in that of Sauveterre.

The communes of Barraute and Camu were merged on 14 June 1841.

== Administration ==
List of Successive Mayors

From	To	Name
1995	2020	Jean Cazenave
2020	2026	Jean Agoutborde

=== Inter-communality ===
The commune is part of five inter-communal structures:

- the inter-communal centre for social action of Community of communes of Béarn des Gaves;
- the Communauté de communes du Béarn des Gaves;
- the Energy association of Pyrénées-Atlantiques;
- the inter-communal association for management of drinking water from the Saleys and the Gaves;
- the inter-communal association of Gaves and Saleys

== Demography ==
Historical population

Year	Pop.	±% p.a.
1793	194	—
1821	216	+0.38%
1846	404	+2.54%
1872	335	−0.72%
1901	304	−0.33%
1926	256	−0.69%
1946	245	−0.22%
1962	213	−0.87%
1968	210	−0.24%

Year	Pop.	±% p.a.
1975	187	−1.64%
1982	186	−0.08%
1990	160	−1.86%
1999	164	+0.27%
2007	150	−1.11%
2012	161	+1.43%
2017	174	+1.57%
2023	187	+1.21%

Source: EHESS and INSEE

== Economy ==
The main activity is agricultural. The commune is part of the Appellation d'origine contrôlée of Ossau-iraty

== Culture and heritage ==
=== Religious heritage ===
The Church of Saint Cyprien and Saint Justine (Middle Ages) is registered as an historical monument. It was restored in the 19th century.

== See also ==
- Communes of the Pyrénées-Atlantiques department
