= Saint-Pé-de-Léren =

- Commune
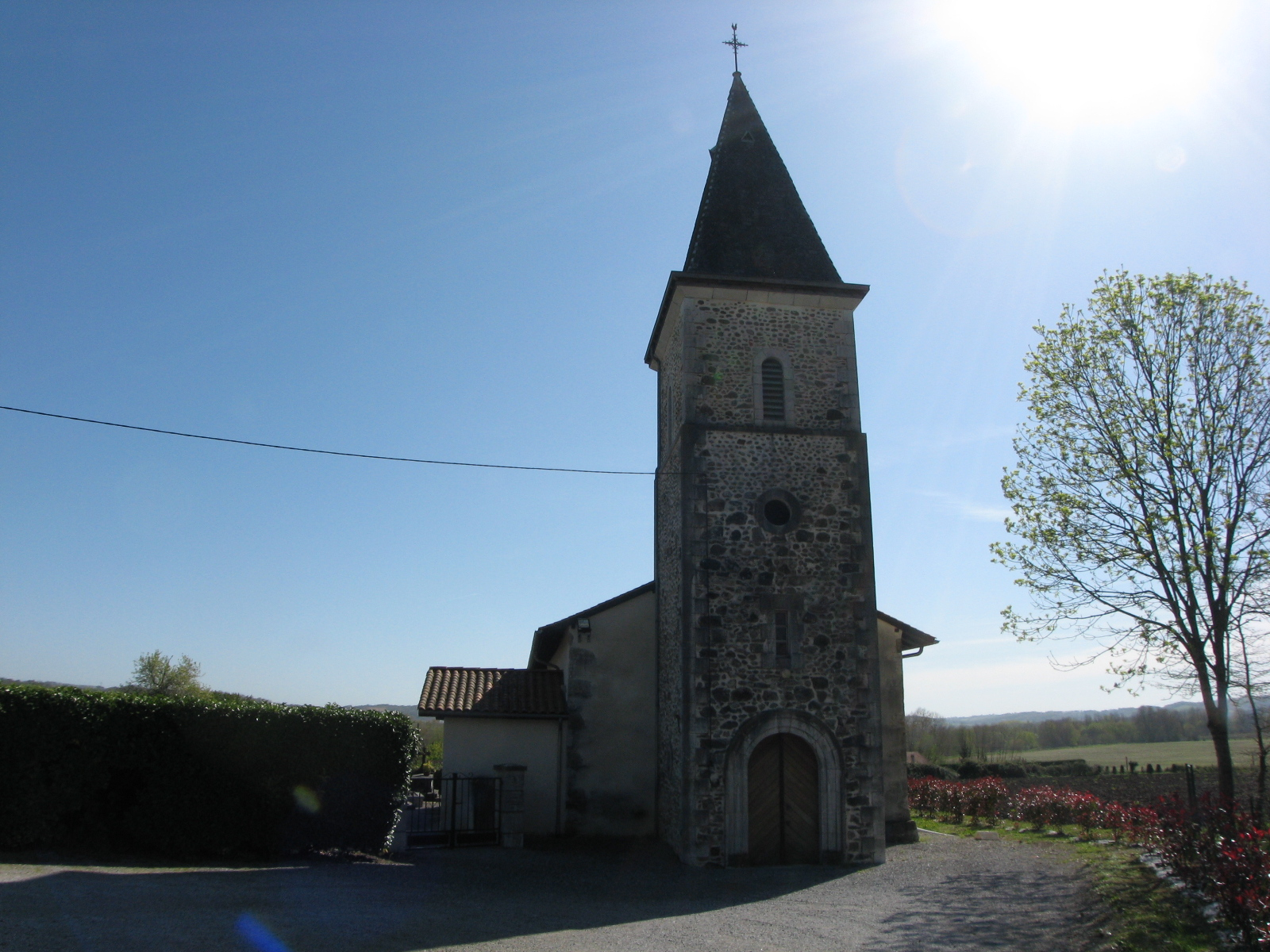
- Church
- Location of Saint-Pé-de-Léren
- Location within France Location within Nouvelle-Aquitaine
- Coordinates: 43°29′35″N 1°02′10″W
- Country: France
- Region: Nouvelle-Aquitaine
- Department: Pyrénées-Atlantiques
- Arrondissement: Oloron-Sainte-Marie
- Canton: Orthez et Terres des Gaves et du Sel

Government
  - Mayor (2020–2026): Gérard Loustau
- Area^{1}: 5.31 km^{2} (2.05 sq mi)
- Elevation: 15 m (49 ft)
- Highest elevation: 49 m (161 ft)
- Lowest elevation: 9 m (30 ft)
- Population (2023): 271
  - Density: 51.0/km^{2} (132/sq mi)
- Time zone: UTC+01:00 (CET)
  - Summer (DST): UTC+02:00 (CEST)
- INSEE/Postal code: 64494 /64270
- ^{1} French Land Register data, which excludes lakes, ponds, glaciers > 1 km^{2} (0.386 sq mi or 247 acres) and river estuaries.

Saint-Pé-de-Léren (French pronunciation: [sɛ̃ pe də leʁɛ̃], literally Saint-Pé of Léren; Occitan: Sent Pèr de Lèren) is a commune in the Pyrénées-Atlantiques department in south-western France.

== See also ==
- Communes of the Pyrénées-Atlantiques department
