= Castagnède, Pyrénées-Atlantiques =

Castagnède
- Commune
- Location of Castagnède
- Location within France Location within Nouvelle-Aquitaine
- Coordinates: 43°27′19″N 0°59′35″W
- Country: France
- Region: Nouvelle-Aquitaine
- Department: Pyrénées-Atlantiques
- Arrondissement: Oloron-Sainte-Marie
- Canton: Orthez et Terres des Gaves et du Sel
- Intercommunality: Béarn des Gaves

Government
  - Mayor (2020–2026): Jean Hourquebie
- Area^{1}: 8.33 km^{2} (3.22 sq mi)
- Elevation: 82 m (269 ft)
- Highest elevation: 171 m (561 ft)
- Lowest elevation: 21 m (69 ft)
- Population (2023): 207
  - Density: 24.8/km^{2} (64.4/sq mi)
- Time zone: UTC+01:00 (CET)
  - Summer (DST): UTC+02:00 (CEST)
- INSEE/Postal code: 64170 /64270
- ^{1} French Land Register data, which excludes lakes, ponds, glaciers > 1 km^{2} (0.386 sq mi or 247 acres) and river estuaries.

Castagnède (French pronunciation: [kastaɲɛd]; Occitan: Castanheda) is a commune in the Pyrénées-Atlantiques department in south-western France.

== See also ==
- Communes of the Pyrénées-Atlantiques department
