= Ossenx =

- Commune
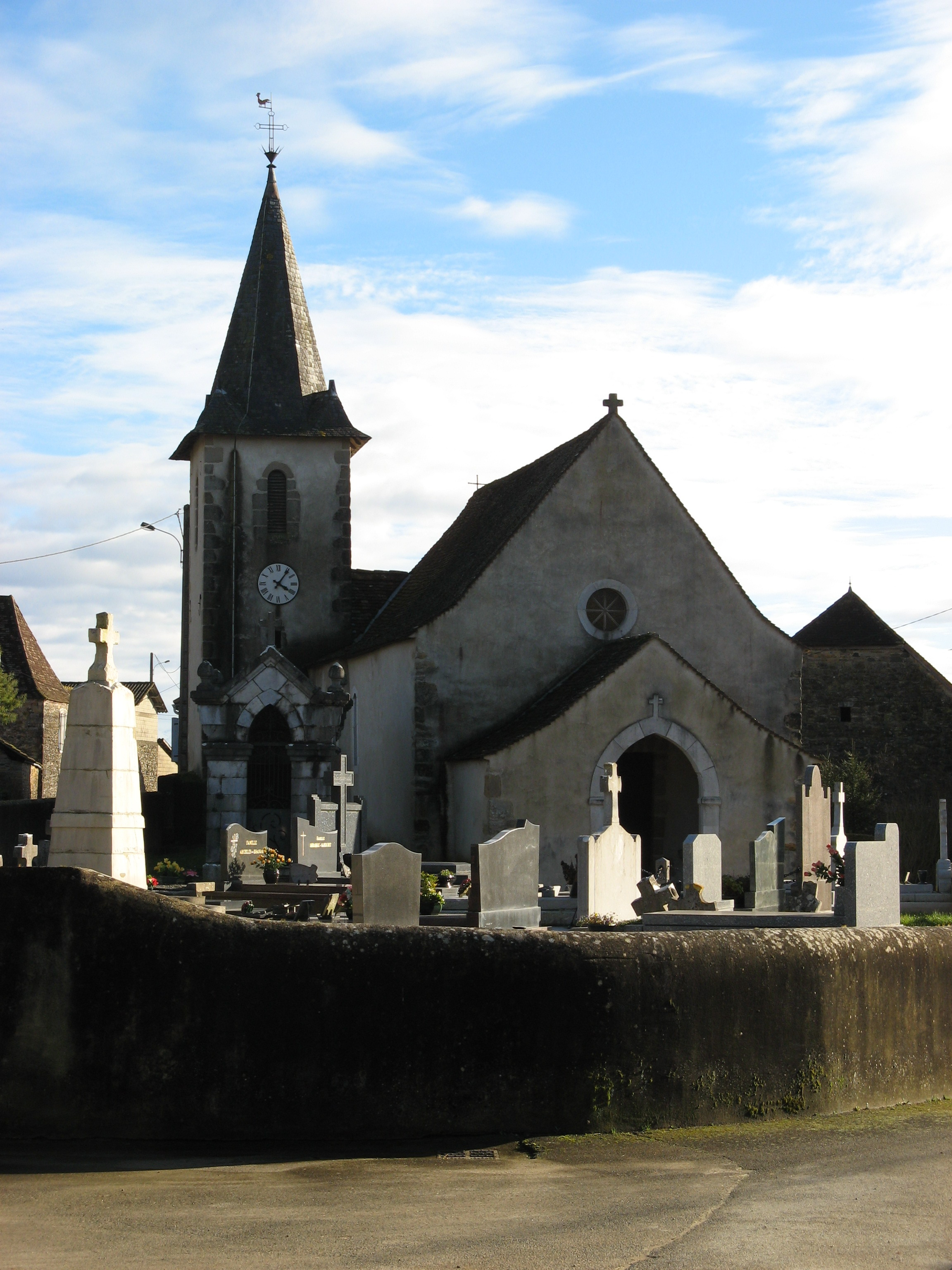
- The church of Ossenx
- Location of Ossenx
- Location within France Location within Nouvelle-Aquitaine
- Coordinates: 43°22′22″N 0°48′54″W
- Country: France
- Region: Nouvelle-Aquitaine
- Department: Pyrénées-Atlantiques
- Arrondissement: Oloron-Sainte-Marie
- Canton: Orthez et Terres des Gaves et du Sel
- Intercommunality: Béarn des Gaves

Government
  - Mayor (2020–2026): Roland Grechez-Cassiau
- Area^{1}: 4.02 km^{2} (1.55 sq mi)
- Elevation: 102 m (335 ft)
- Highest elevation: 219 m (719 ft)
- Lowest elevation: 77 m (253 ft)
- Population (2023): 51
  - Density: 13/km^{2} (33/sq mi)
- Time zone: UTC+01:00 (CET)
  - Summer (DST): UTC+02:00 (CEST)
- INSEE/Postal code: 64434 /64190
- ^{1} French Land Register data, which excludes lakes, ponds, glaciers > 1 km^{2} (0.386 sq mi or 247 acres) and river estuaries.

Ossenx (French pronunciation: [ɔsɛ̃ks]; Occitan: Aussencs) is a commune in the Pyrénées-Atlantiques department in south-western France.

== See also ==
- Communes of the Pyrénées-Atlantiques department
