= Canton of Orthez et Terres des Gaves et du Sel =

Coordinates: 43°30′07″N 0°46′05″W

Orthez et Terres des Gaves et du Sel
- Canton
- Interactive map of Orthez et Terres des Gaves et du Sel
- Country: France
- Region: Nouvelle-Aquitaine
- Department: Pyrénées-Atlantiques
- No. of communes: {{{nbcomm}}}
- Area: 397.32 km^{2} (153.41 sq mi)
- Population (2023): 27,531
  - Density: 69.292/km^{2} (179.46/sq mi)
- INSEE code: 6416

The canton of Orthez et Terres des Gaves et du Sel (before 2015: canton of Orthez) is a canton of France, in the Pyrénées-Atlantiques department. Its chief town is Orthez.

== Composition ==
At the French canton reorganisation which came into effect in March 2015, the canton was renamed and expanded from 13 to 40 communes:

1. Abitain
2. Andrein
3. Athos-Aspis
4. Auterrive
5. Autevielle-Saint-Martin-Bideren
6. Baigts-de-Béarn
7. Barraute-Camu
8. Bellocq
9. Bérenx
10. Burgaronne
11. Carresse-Cassaber
12. Castagnède
13. Castetbon
14. Escos
15. Espiute
16. Guinarthe-Parenties
17. L'Hôpital-d'Orion
18. Laàs
19. Labastide-Villefranche
20. Lahontan
21. Lanneplaà
22. Léren
23. Montfort
24. Narp
25. Oraàs
26. Orion
27. Orriule
28. Orthez
29. Ossenx
30. Puyoô
31. Ramous
32. Saint-Boès
33. Saint-Dos
34. Saint-Girons-en-Béarn
35. Saint-Gladie-Arrive-Munein
36. Saint-Pé-de-Léren
37. Salies-de-Béarn
38. Salles-Mongiscard
39. Sauveterre-de-Béarn
40. Tabaille-Usquain

== Recent history ==
List of the Counsellors General
Date of election	Name	Party
1995	Bernard Moleres	
2001	Bernard Moleres	
This list is highly incomplete.

== See also ==
- Cantons of the Pyrénées-Atlantiques department
- Communes of the Pyrénées-Atlantiques department
