= Arrondissement of Oloron-Sainte-Marie =

Coordinates: 43°11′N 0°37′W

Oloron-Sainte-Marie
- Arrondissement
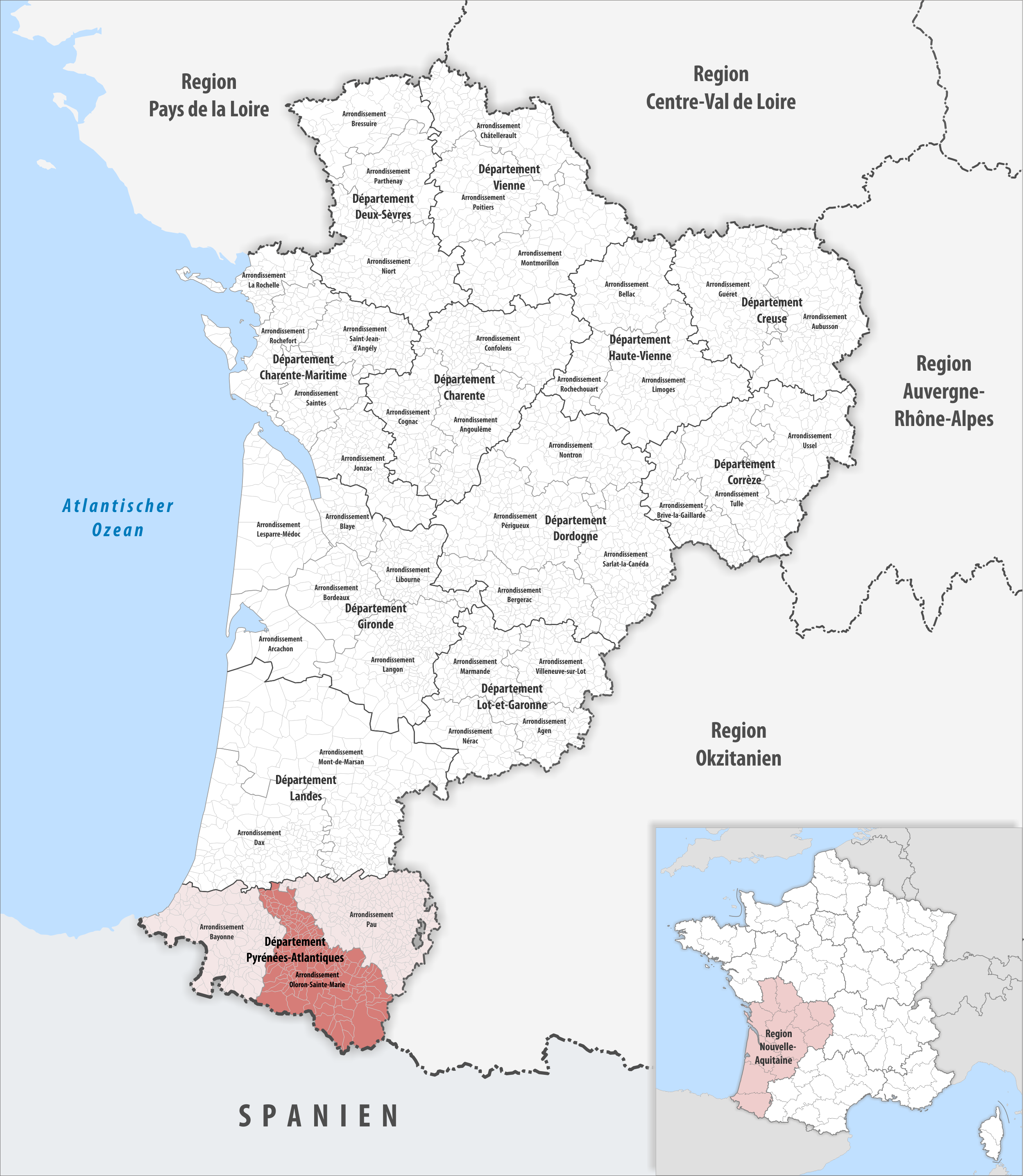
- Location within the region Nouvelle-Aquitaine
- Country: France
- Region: Nouvelle-Aquitaine
- Department: Pyrénées-Atlantiques
- No. of communes: {{{nbcomm}}}
- Area: 2,828.2 km^{2} (1,092.0 sq mi)
- Population (2023): 71,963
  - Density: 25.445/km^{2} (65.902/sq mi)
- INSEE code: 642

The arrondissement of Oloron-Sainte-Marie is an arrondissement of France in the Pyrénées-Atlantiques department in the Nouvelle-Aquitaine region. It has 155 communes. Its population is 71,686 (2021), and its area is 2,828.2 km^{2} (1,092.0 sq mi).

== Composition ==
The communes of the arrondissement of Oloron-Sainte-Marie, and their INSEE codes, are:

1. Abitain (64004)
2. Accous (64006)
3. Agnos (64007)
4. Ainharp (64012)
5. Alçay-Alçabéhéty-Sunharette (64015)
6. Alos-Sibas-Abense (64017)
7. Ance Féas (64225)
8. Andrein (64022)
9. Angous (64025)
10. Aramits (64029)
11. Araujuzon (64032)
12. Araux (64033)
13. Aren (64039)
14. Arette (64040)
15. Arrast-Larrebieu (64050)
16. Arudy (64062)
17. Asasp-Arros (64064)
18. Aste-Béon (64069)
19. Athos-Aspis (64071)
20. Audaux (64075)
21. Aussurucq (64081)
22. Auterrive (64082)
23. Autevielle-Saint-Martin-Bideren (64083)
24. Aydius (64085)
25. Barcus (64093)
26. Barraute-Camu (64096)
27. Bastanès (64099)
28. Bedous (64104)
29. Béost (64110)
30. Bérenx (64112)
31. Berrogain-Laruns (64115)
32. Bescat (64116)
33. Bidos (64126)
34. Bielle (64127)
35. Bilhères (64128)
36. Borce (64136)
37. Bugnein (64149)
38. Burgaronne (64151)
39. Buziet (64156)
40. Buzy (64157)
41. Camou-Cihigue (64162)
42. Carresse-Cassaber (64168)
43. Castagnède (64170)
44. Castet (64175)
45. Castetbon (64176)
46. Castetnau-Camblong (64178)
47. Cette-Eygun (64185)
48. Charre (64186)
49. Charritte-de-Bas (64187)
50. Chéraute (64188)
51. Dognen (64201)
52. Eaux-Bonnes (64204)
53. Escos (64205)
54. Escot (64206)
55. Escou (64207)
56. Escout (64209)
57. Espès-Undurein (64214)
58. Espiute (64215)
59. Esquiule (64217)
60. Estialescq (64219)
61. Estos (64220)
62. Etchebar (64222)
63. Etsaut (64223)
64. Eysus (64224)
65. Garindein (64231)
66. Gère-Bélesten (64240)
67. Géronce (64241)
68. Gestas (64242)
69. Geüs-d'Oloron (64244)
70. Goès (64245)
71. Gotein-Libarrenx (64247)
72. Guinarthe-Parenties (64251)
73. Gurmençon (64252)
74. Gurs (64253)
75. Haux (64258)
76. Herrère (64261)
77. L'Hôpital-d'Orion (64263)
78. L'Hôpital-Saint-Blaise (64264)
79. Idaux-Mendy (64268)
80. Issor (64276)
81. Izeste (64280)
82. Jasses (64281)
83. Laàs (64287)
84. Labastide-Villefranche (64291)
85. Lacarry-Arhan-Charritte-de-Haut (64298)
86. Laguinge-Restoue (64303)
87. Lahontan (64305)
88. Lanne-en-Barétous (64310)
89. Larrau (64316)
90. Laruns (64320)
91. Lasseube (64324)
92. Lasseubetat (64325)
93. Lay-Lamidou (64326)
94. Ledeuix (64328)
95. Lées-Athas (64330)
96. Léren (64334)
97. Lescun (64336)
98. Lichans-Sunhar (64340)
99. Lichos (64341)
100. Licq-Athérey (64342)
101. Lourdios-Ichère (64351)
102. Louvie-Juzon (64353)
103. Louvie-Soubiron (64354)
104. Lurbe-Saint-Christau (64360)
105. Lys (64363)
106. Mauléon-Licharre (64371)
107. Menditte (64378)
108. Méritein (64381)
109. Moncayolle-Larrory-Mendibieu (64391)
110. Montfort (64403)
111. Montory (64404)
112. Moumour (64409)
113. Musculdy (64411)
114. Nabas (64412)
115. Narp (64414)
116. Navarrenx (64416)
117. Ogenne-Camptort (64420)
118. Ogeu-les-Bains (64421)
119. Oloron-Sainte-Marie (64422)
120. Oraàs (64423)
121. Ordiarp (64424)
122. Orin (64426)
123. Orion (64427)
124. Orriule (64428)
125. Ossas-Suhare (64432)
126. Osse-en-Aspe (64433)
127. Ossenx (64434)
128. Poey-d'Oloron (64449)
129. Préchacq-Josbaig (64458)
130. Préchacq-Navarrenx (64459)
131. Précilhon (64460)
132. Rébénacq (64463)
133. Rivehaute (64466)
134. Roquiague (64468)
135. Saint-Dos (64474)
136. Sainte-Colome (64473)
137. Sainte-Engrâce (64475)
138. Saint-Gladie-Arrive-Munein (64480)
139. Saint-Goin (64481)
140. Saint-Pé-de-Léren (64494)
141. Salies-de-Béarn (64499)
142. Sarrance (64506)
143. Saucède (64508)
144. Sauguis-Saint-Étienne (64509)
145. Sauveterre-de-Béarn (64513)
146. Sévignacq-Meyracq (64522)
147. Sus (64529)
148. Susmiou (64530)
149. Tabaille-Usquain (64531)
150. Tardets-Sorholus (64533)
151. Trois-Villes (64537)
152. Urdos (64542)
153. Verdets (64551)
154. Viellenave-de-Navarrenx (64555)
155. Viodos-Abense-de-Bas (64559)

== History ==
The arrondissement of Oloron-Sainte-Marie was created in 1800. At the January 2017 reorganisation of the arrondissements of Pyrénées-Atlantiques, it gained 11 communes from the arrondissement of Pau and one commune from the arrondissement of Bayonne, and it lost 11 communes to the arrondissement of Pau.

As a result of the reorganisation of the cantons of France which came into effect in 2015, the borders of the cantons are no longer related to the borders of the arrondissements. The cantons of the arrondissement of Oloron-Sainte-Marie were, as of January 2015:

1. Accous
2. Aramits
3. Arudy
4. Laruns
5. Lasseube
6. Mauléon-Licharre
7. Monein
8. Navarrenx
9. Oloron-Sainte-Marie-Est
10. Oloron-Sainte-Marie-Ouest
11. Sauveterre-de-Béarn
12. Tardets-Sorholus

== Sub-prefects ==
- Régis Guyot (1980)
