= Guinarthe-Parenties =

- Commune
- Location of Guinarthe-Parenties
- Location within France Location within Nouvelle-Aquitaine
- Coordinates: 43°23′04″N 0°56′51″W
- Country: France
- Region: Nouvelle-Aquitaine
- Department: Pyrénées-Atlantiques
- Arrondissement: Oloron-Sainte-Marie
- Canton: Orthez et Terres des Gaves et du Sel
- Intercommunality: Béarn des Gaves

Government
  - Mayor (2020–2026): Pierre Vignau
- Area^{1}: 2.48 km^{2} (0.96 sq mi)
- Elevation: 70 m (230 ft)
- Highest elevation: 79 m (259 ft)
- Lowest elevation: 44 m (144 ft)
- Population (2023): 227
  - Density: 91.5/km^{2} (237/sq mi)
- Time zone: UTC+01:00 (CET)
  - Summer (DST): UTC+02:00 (CEST)
- INSEE/Postal code: 64251 /64390
- ^{1} French Land Register data, which excludes lakes, ponds, glaciers > 1 km^{2} (0.386 sq mi or 247 acres) and river estuaries.

Guinarthe-Parenties (Occitan: Parentés) is a commune in the Pyrénées-Atlantiques department in south-western France.

== See also ==
- Communes of the Pyrénées-Atlantiques department
