= Puyoô =

- Commune
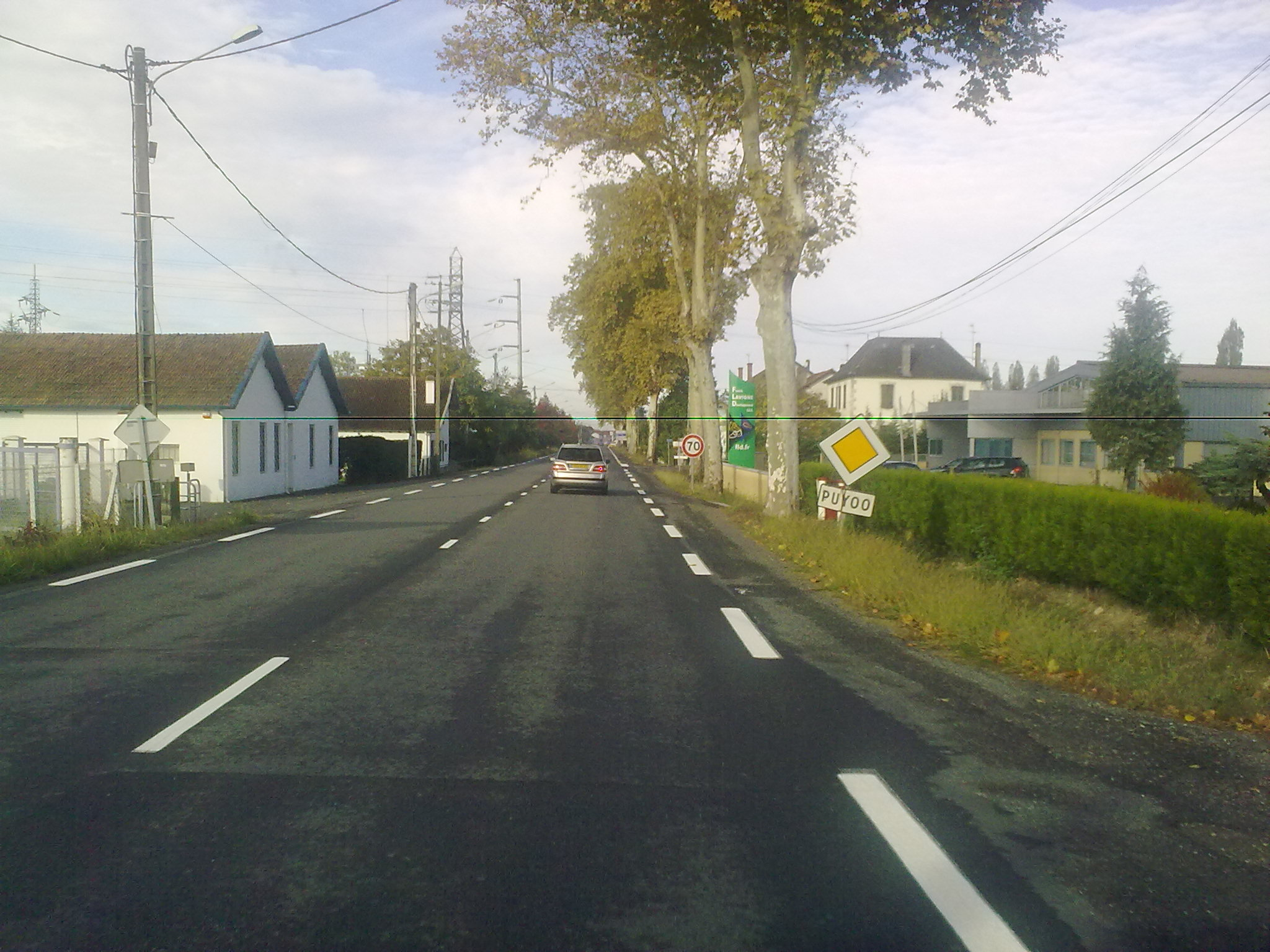
- The road into Puyoô
- Location of Puyoô
- Location within France Location within Nouvelle-Aquitaine
- Coordinates: 43°31′N 0°55′W
- Country: France
- Region: Nouvelle-Aquitaine
- Department: Pyrénées-Atlantiques
- Arrondissement: Pau
- Canton: Orthez et Terres des Gaves et du Sel

Government
  - Mayor (2020–2026): Michel Labourdette
- Area^{1}: 9.32 km^{2} (3.60 sq mi)
- Elevation: 41 m (135 ft)
- Highest elevation: 155 m (509 ft)
- Lowest elevation: 17 m (56 ft)
- Population (2023): 1,077
  - Density: 116/km^{2} (299/sq mi)
- Time zone: UTC+01:00 (CET)
  - Summer (DST): UTC+02:00 (CEST)
- INSEE/Postal code: 64461 /64270
- ^{1} French Land Register data, which excludes lakes, ponds, glaciers > 1 km^{2} (0.386 sq mi or 247 acres) and river estuaries.

Puyoô (French pronunciation: [pɥijo]) is a commune in the Pyrénées-Atlantiques department in south-western France.

== Geography ==
The town is situated on the Gave de Pau, a river running through the region, and some of the river's tributaries, including the streams of Lataillard, Espérance and Loulié. Puyoô neighbours the towns of Bellocq to the south-west and Ramous to the south-east. The local railway station, Gare de Puyoô, opened in 1862. Today, it has approximately 10,300 passengers a year.

== Name ==
Puyoô is derived from the Bearnaise word Pujóu meaning small hill. Pujóu can be further derived from the Latin word podium, meaning height. People from the town are known in French as Puyolais.

== Economy ==
The town's economy is generally agriculture-oriented.

== Culture ==
Puyoô has a rugby field and tennis courts, as well as a town hall. A community festival is held towards the end of June.

== See also ==
- Communes of the Pyrénées-Atlantiques department
