= Espiute =

- Commune
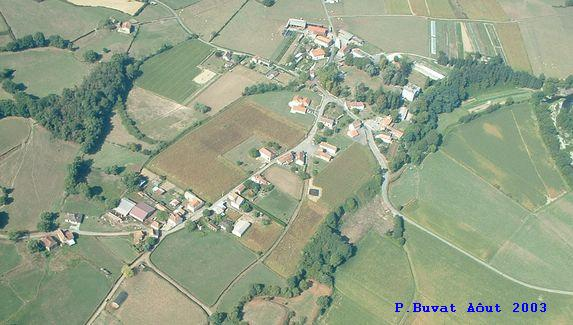
- An aerial view of Espiute
- Location of Espiute
- Location within France Location within Nouvelle-Aquitaine
- Coordinates: 43°21′36″N 0°54′51″W
- Country: France
- Region: Nouvelle-Aquitaine
- Department: Pyrénées-Atlantiques
- Arrondissement: Oloron-Sainte-Marie
- Canton: Orthez et Terres des Gaves et du Sel
- Intercommunality: Béarn des Gaves

Government
  - Mayor (2020–2026): Françoise Louis
- Area^{1}: 4.09 km^{2} (1.58 sq mi)
- Elevation: 79 m (259 ft)
- Highest elevation: 175 m (574 ft)
- Lowest elevation: 70 m (230 ft)
- Population (2023): 113
  - Density: 27.6/km^{2} (71.6/sq mi)
- Time zone: UTC+01:00 (CET)
  - Summer (DST): UTC+02:00 (CEST)
- INSEE/Postal code: 64215 /64390
- ^{1} French Land Register data, which excludes lakes, ponds, glaciers > 1 km^{2} (0.386 sq mi or 247 acres) and river estuaries.

Espiute (French pronunciation: [ɛspjyt]; Occitan: Espiuta; Basque: Azpilda) is a commune in the Pyrénées-Atlantiques department in south-western France.

== See also ==
- Communes of the Pyrénées-Atlantiques department
