= Bérenx =

- Commune
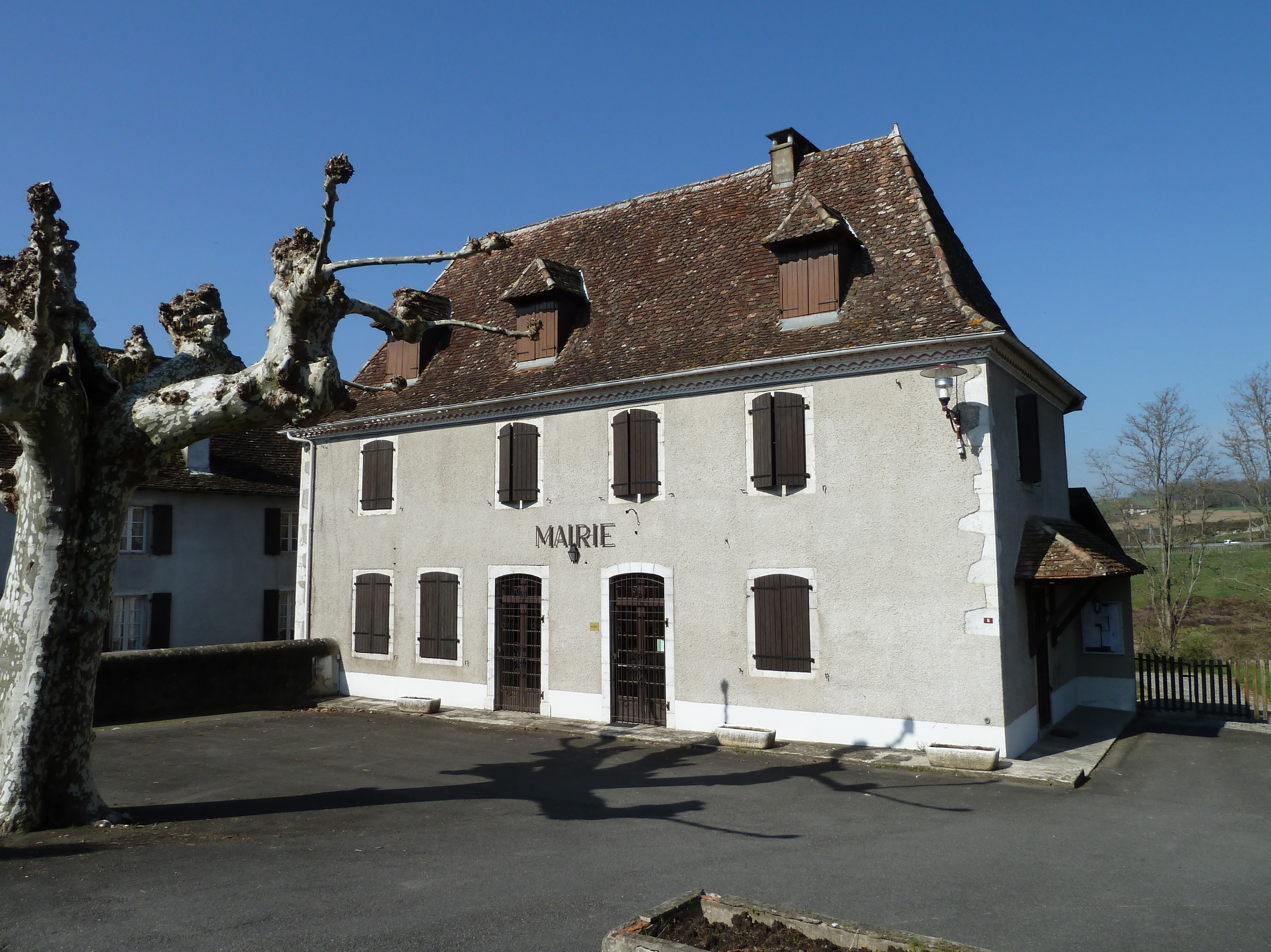
- Town hall
- Location of Bérenx
- Location within France Location within Nouvelle-Aquitaine
- Coordinates: 43°30′13″N 0°51′21″W
- Country: France
- Region: Nouvelle-Aquitaine
- Department: Pyrénées-Atlantiques
- Arrondissement: Oloron-Sainte-Marie
- Canton: Orthez et Terres des Gaves et du Sel
- Intercommunality: Béarn des Gaves

Government
  - Mayor (2020–2026): Jean-François Billerach
- Area^{1}: 13.59 km^{2} (5.25 sq mi)
- Elevation: 89 m (292 ft)
- Highest elevation: 176 m (577 ft)
- Lowest elevation: 25 m (82 ft)
- Population (2023): 428
  - Density: 31.5/km^{2} (81.6/sq mi)
- Time zone: UTC+01:00 (CET)
  - Summer (DST): UTC+02:00 (CEST)
- INSEE/Postal code: 64112 /64300
- ^{1} French Land Register data, which excludes lakes, ponds, glaciers > 1 km^{2} (0.386 sq mi or 247 acres) and river estuaries.

Bérenx (French pronunciation: [beʁɛ̃ks]; Occitan: Berencs) is a commune of the Pyrénées-Atlantiques department in southwestern France.

== See also ==
- Communes of the Pyrénées-Atlantiques department
