= Tabaille-Usquain =

- Commune
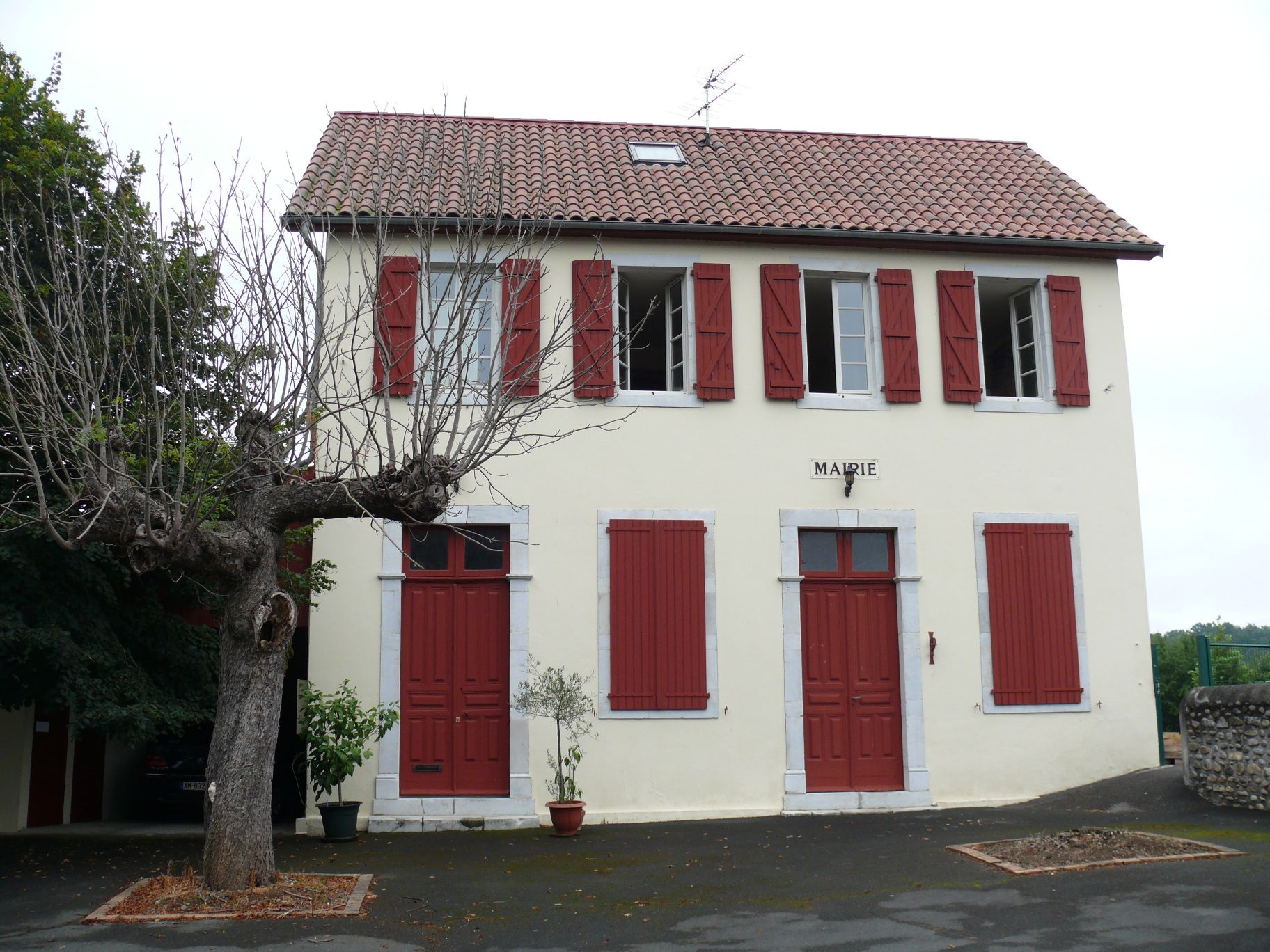
- The town hall
- Location of Tabaille-Usquain
- Location within France Location within Nouvelle-Aquitaine
- Coordinates: 43°21′27″N 0°53′36″W
- Country: France
- Region: Nouvelle-Aquitaine
- Department: Pyrénées-Atlantiques
- Arrondissement: Oloron-Sainte-Marie
- Canton: Orthez et Terres des Gaves et du Sel
- Intercommunality: Béarn des Gaves

Government
  - Mayor (2020–2026): Germain Sallenave
- Area^{1}: 4.50 km^{2} (1.74 sq mi)
- Elevation: 119 m (390 ft)
- Highest elevation: 181 m (594 ft)
- Lowest elevation: 69 m (226 ft)
- Population (2023): 47
  - Density: 10/km^{2} (27/sq mi)
- Time zone: UTC+01:00 (CET)
  - Summer (DST): UTC+02:00 (CEST)
- INSEE/Postal code: 64531 /64190
- ^{1} French Land Register data, which excludes lakes, ponds, glaciers > 1 km^{2} (0.386 sq mi or 247 acres) and river estuaries.

Tabaille-Usquain (French pronunciation: [tabaj yskɛ̃]; Occitan: Tabalha e Usquenh) is a commune in the Pyrénées-Atlantiques department and Nouvelle-Aquitaine region of south-western France.

== Population ==
Historical population
Year	Pop.	±% p.a.
1968	83	—
1975	79	−0.70%
1982	53	−5.54%
1990	62	+1.98%
1999	53	−1.73%
2007	52	−0.24%
2012	32	−9.25%
2017	44	+6.58%
2023	47	+1.11%
Source: INSEE

== See also ==
- Communes of the Pyrénées-Atlantiques department
