= Labastide-Villefranche =

- Commune
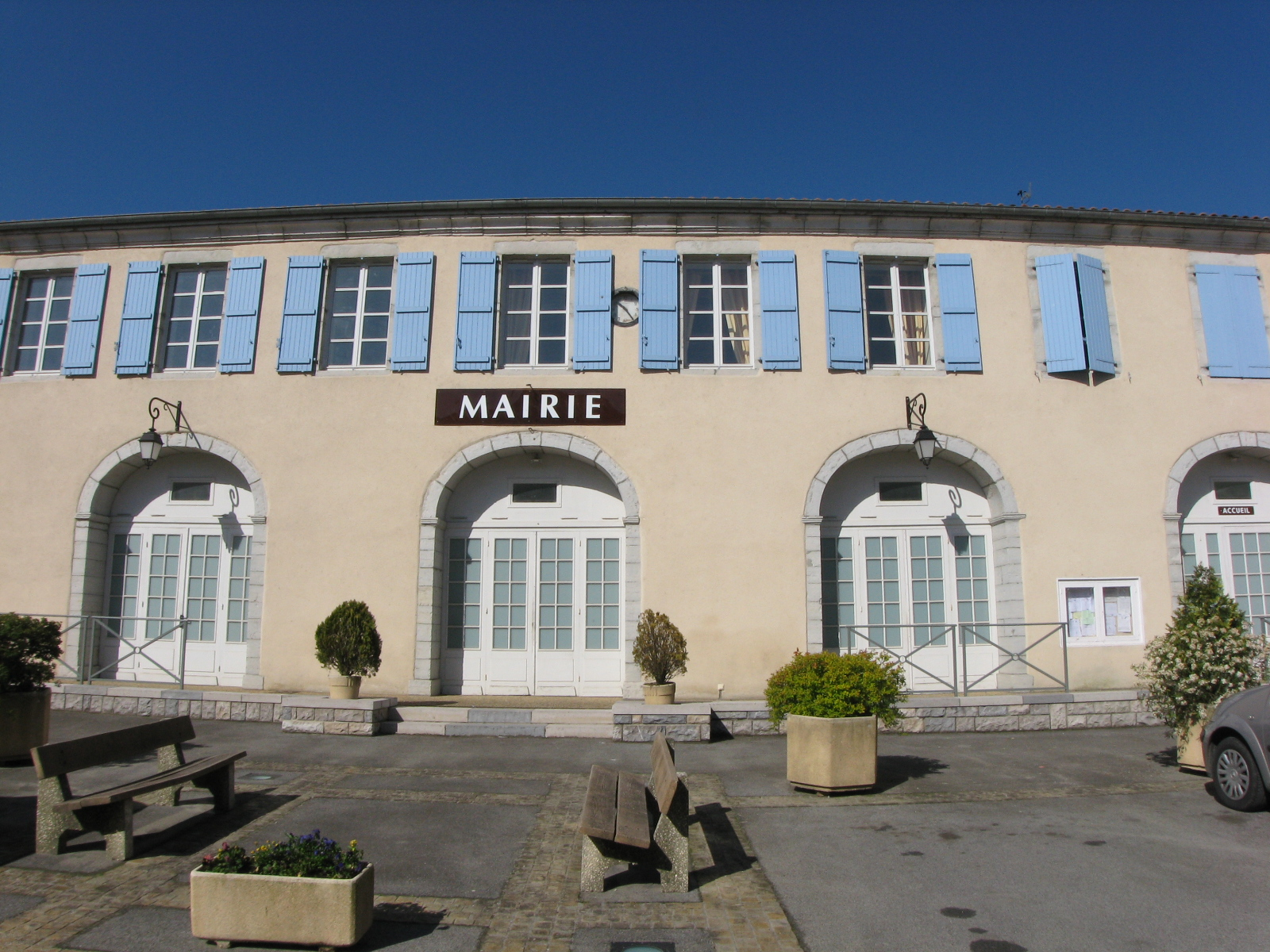
- Town Hall
- Location of Labastide-Villefranche
- Location within France Location within Nouvelle-Aquitaine
- Coordinates: 43°27′14″N 1°01′09″W
- Country: France
- Region: Nouvelle-Aquitaine
- Department: Pyrénées-Atlantiques
- Arrondissement: Oloron-Sainte-Marie
- Canton: Orthez et Terres des Gaves et du Sel
- Intercommunality: Béarn des Gaves

Government
  - Mayor (2020–2026): Jean-Jacques Lateulère
- Area^{1}: 15.27 km^{2} (5.90 sq mi)
- Elevation: 25 m (82 ft)
- Highest elevation: 156 m (512 ft)
- Lowest elevation: 21 m (69 ft)
- Population (2023): 343
  - Density: 22.5/km^{2} (58.2/sq mi)
- Time zone: UTC+01:00 (CET)
  - Summer (DST): UTC+02:00 (CEST)
- INSEE/Postal code: 64291 /64270
- ^{1} French Land Register data, which excludes lakes, ponds, glaciers > 1 km^{2} (0.386 sq mi or 247 acres) and river estuaries.

Labastide-Villefranche (French pronunciation: [labastid vilfʁɑ̃ʃ]; Basque: Bastidaxarre; Occitan: La Bastida) is a commune in the Pyrénées-Atlantiques department in south-western France.

== See also ==
- Communes of the Pyrénées-Atlantiques department
