= Narp =

- Commune
- Location of Narp
- Location within France Location within Nouvelle-Aquitaine
- Coordinates: 43°22′35″N 0°49′45″W
- Country: France
- Region: Nouvelle-Aquitaine
- Department: Pyrénées-Atlantiques
- Arrondissement: Oloron-Sainte-Marie
- Canton: Orthez et Terres des Gaves et du Sel
- Intercommunality: Béarn des Gaves

Government
  - Mayor (2023–2026): Jean-Claude Maladot
- Area^{1}: 6.33 km^{2} (2.44 sq mi)
- Elevation: 94 m (308 ft)
- Highest elevation: 235 m (771 ft)
- Lowest elevation: 79 m (259 ft)
- Population (2023): 122
  - Density: 19.3/km^{2} (49.9/sq mi)
- Time zone: UTC+01:00 (CET)
  - Summer (DST): UTC+02:00 (CEST)
- INSEE/Postal code: 64414 /64190
- ^{1} French Land Register data, which excludes lakes, ponds, glaciers > 1 km^{2} (0.386 sq mi or 247 acres) and river estuaries.

Narp (French pronunciation: [naʁp]) is a commune in the Pyrénées-Atlantiques department in south-western France.

== See also ==
- Communes of the Pyrénées-Atlantiques department
