= Salles-Mongiscard =

- Commune
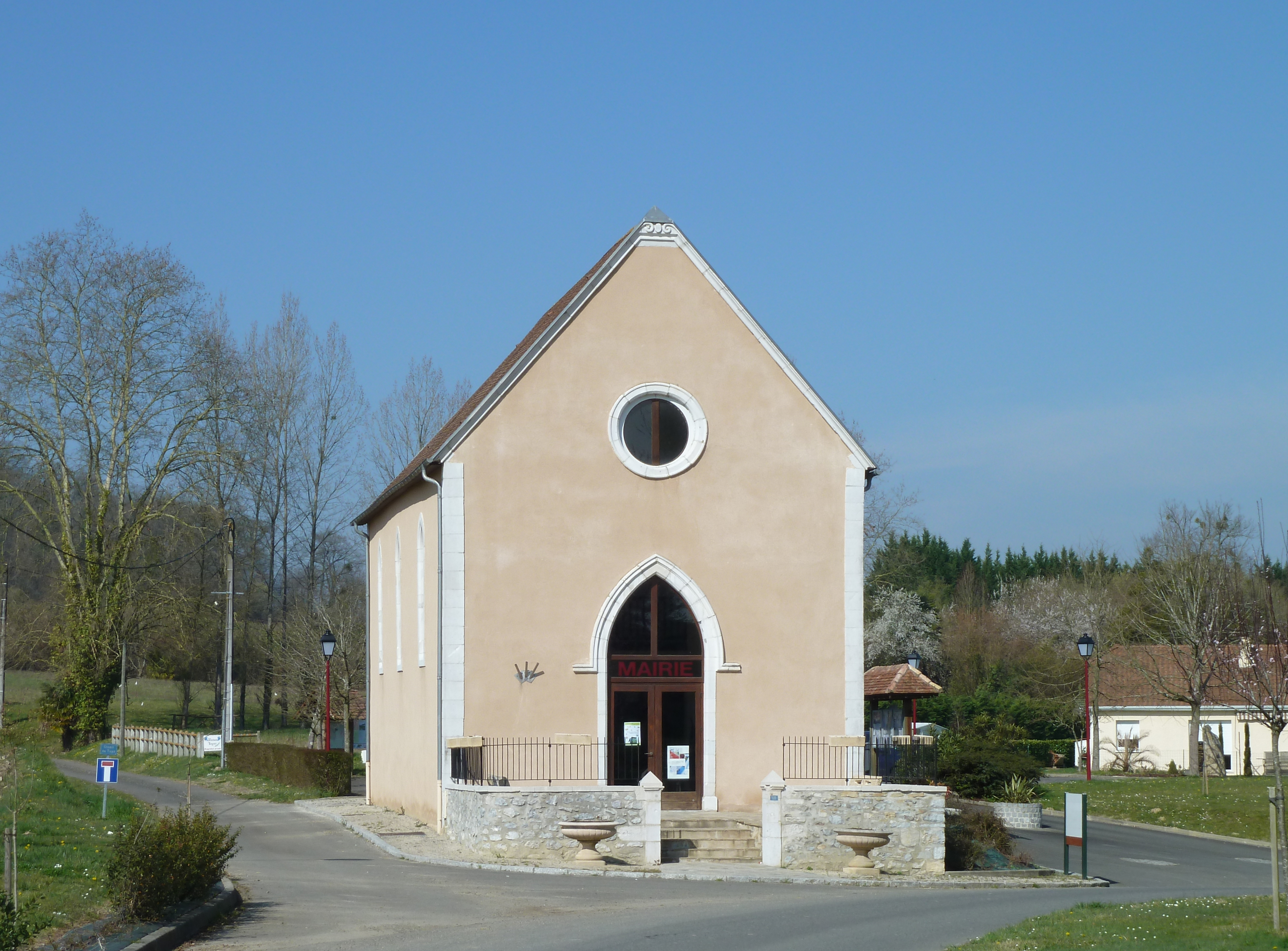
- The town hall of Salles-Mongiscard
- Location of Salles-Mongiscard
- Location within France Location within Nouvelle-Aquitaine
- Coordinates: 43°29′53″N 0°50′02″W
- Country: France
- Region: Nouvelle-Aquitaine
- Department: Pyrénées-Atlantiques
- Arrondissement: Pau
- Canton: Orthez et Terres des Gaves et du Sel

Government
  - Mayor (2020–2026): Guy Romain
- Area^{1}: 5.84 km^{2} (2.25 sq mi)
- Elevation: 60 m (200 ft)
- Highest elevation: 175 m (574 ft)
- Lowest elevation: 37 m (121 ft)
- Population (2023): 315
  - Density: 53.9/km^{2} (140/sq mi)
- Time zone: UTC+01:00 (CET)
  - Summer (DST): UTC+02:00 (CEST)
- INSEE/Postal code: 64500 /64300
- ^{1} French Land Register data, which excludes lakes, ponds, glaciers > 1 km^{2} (0.386 sq mi or 247 acres) and river estuaries.

Salles-Mongiscard (French pronunciation: [sal mɔ̃ʒiskaʁ]; Occitan: Salas de Baura) is a commune in the Pyrénées-Atlantiques department in south-western France. The parish church is dedicated to Saint Laurent.

== See also ==
- Communes of the Pyrénées-Atlantiques department
