= Burgaronne =

- Commune
- Location of Burgaronne
- Location within France Location within Nouvelle-Aquitaine
- Coordinates: 43°24′46″N 0°54′29″W
- Country: France
- Region: Nouvelle-Aquitaine
- Department: Pyrénées-Atlantiques
- Arrondissement: Oloron-Sainte-Marie
- Canton: Orthez et Terres des Gaves et du Sel

Government
  - Mayor (2020–2026): Jean Iturria
- Area^{1}: 5.27 km^{2} (2.03 sq mi)
- Elevation: 241 m (791 ft)
- Highest elevation: 216 m (709 ft)
- Lowest elevation: 86 m (282 ft)
- Population (2023): 98
  - Density: 19/km^{2} (48/sq mi)
- Time zone: UTC+01:00 (CET)
  - Summer (DST): UTC+02:00 (CEST)
- INSEE/Postal code: 64151 /64390
- ^{1} French Land Register data, which excludes lakes, ponds, glaciers > 1 km^{2} (0.386 sq mi or 247 acres) and river estuaries.

Burgaronne (French pronunciation: [byʁɡaʁɔn]; Occitan: Bergarona) is a commune in the Pyrénées-Atlantiques department in southwestern France.

== See also ==
- Communes of the Pyrénées-Atlantiques department
