= Saint-Dos =

- Commune
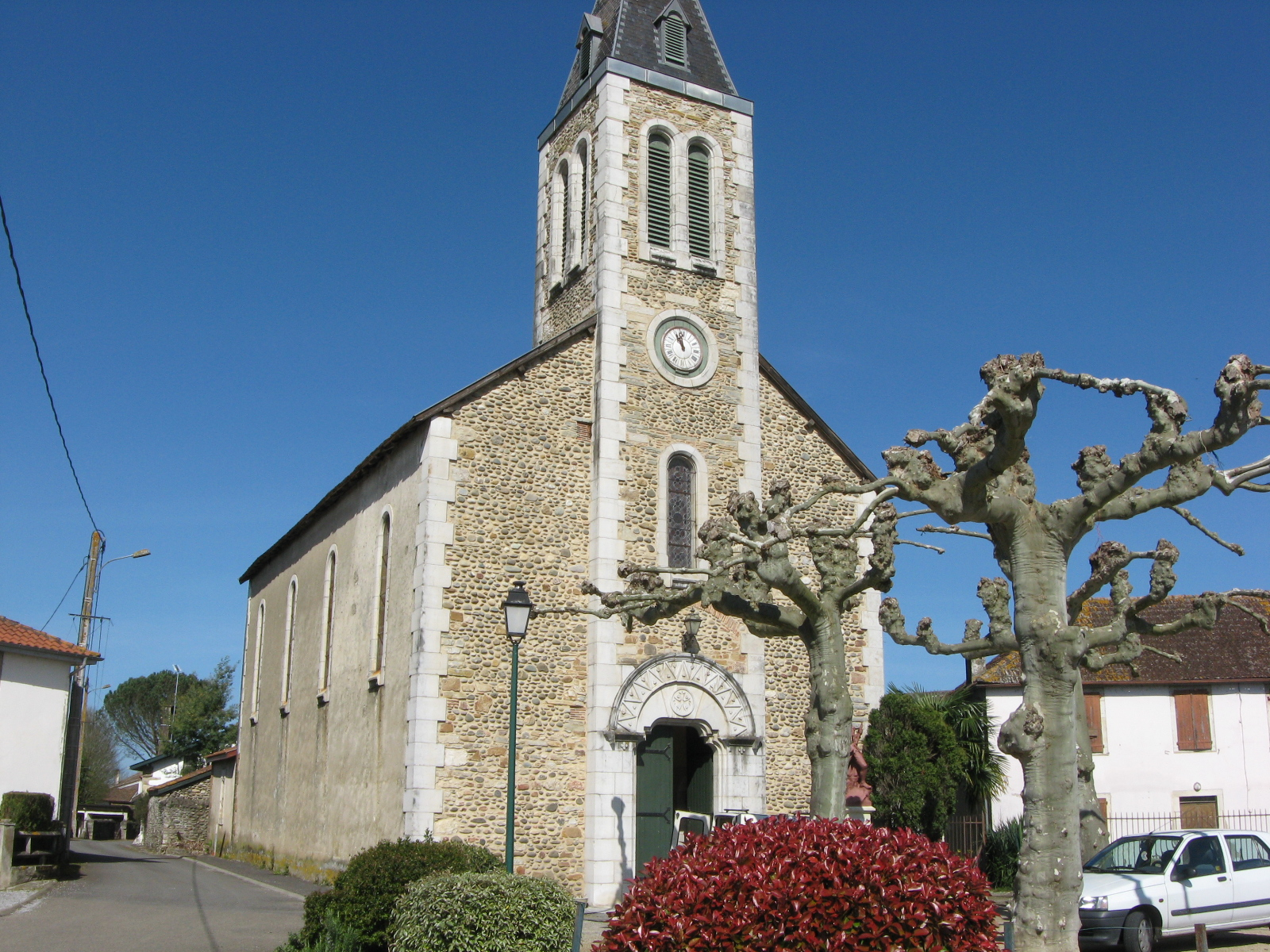
- Church
- Location of Saint-Dos
- Location within France Location within Nouvelle-Aquitaine
- Coordinates: 43°28′26″N 1°01′16″W
- Country: France
- Region: Nouvelle-Aquitaine
- Department: Pyrénées-Atlantiques
- Arrondissement: Oloron-Sainte-Marie
- Canton: Orthez et Terres des Gaves et du Sel

Government
  - Mayor (2020–2026): Alexandre Cassou
- Area^{1}: 1.84 km^{2} (0.71 sq mi)
- Elevation: 28 m (92 ft)
- Highest elevation: 48 m (157 ft)
- Lowest elevation: 12 m (39 ft)
- Population (2023): 160
  - Density: 87/km^{2} (230/sq mi)
- Time zone: UTC+01:00 (CET)
  - Summer (DST): UTC+02:00 (CEST)
- INSEE/Postal code: 64474 /64270
- ^{1} French Land Register data, which excludes lakes, ponds, glaciers > 1 km^{2} (0.386 sq mi or 247 acres) and river estuaries.

Saint-Dos (French pronunciation: [sɛ̃ dɔs]; Occitan: Sendòs) is a commune in the Pyrénées-Atlantiques department in south-western France.

== See also ==
- Communes of the Pyrénées-Atlantiques department
