= Saint-Girons-en-Béarn =

- Commune
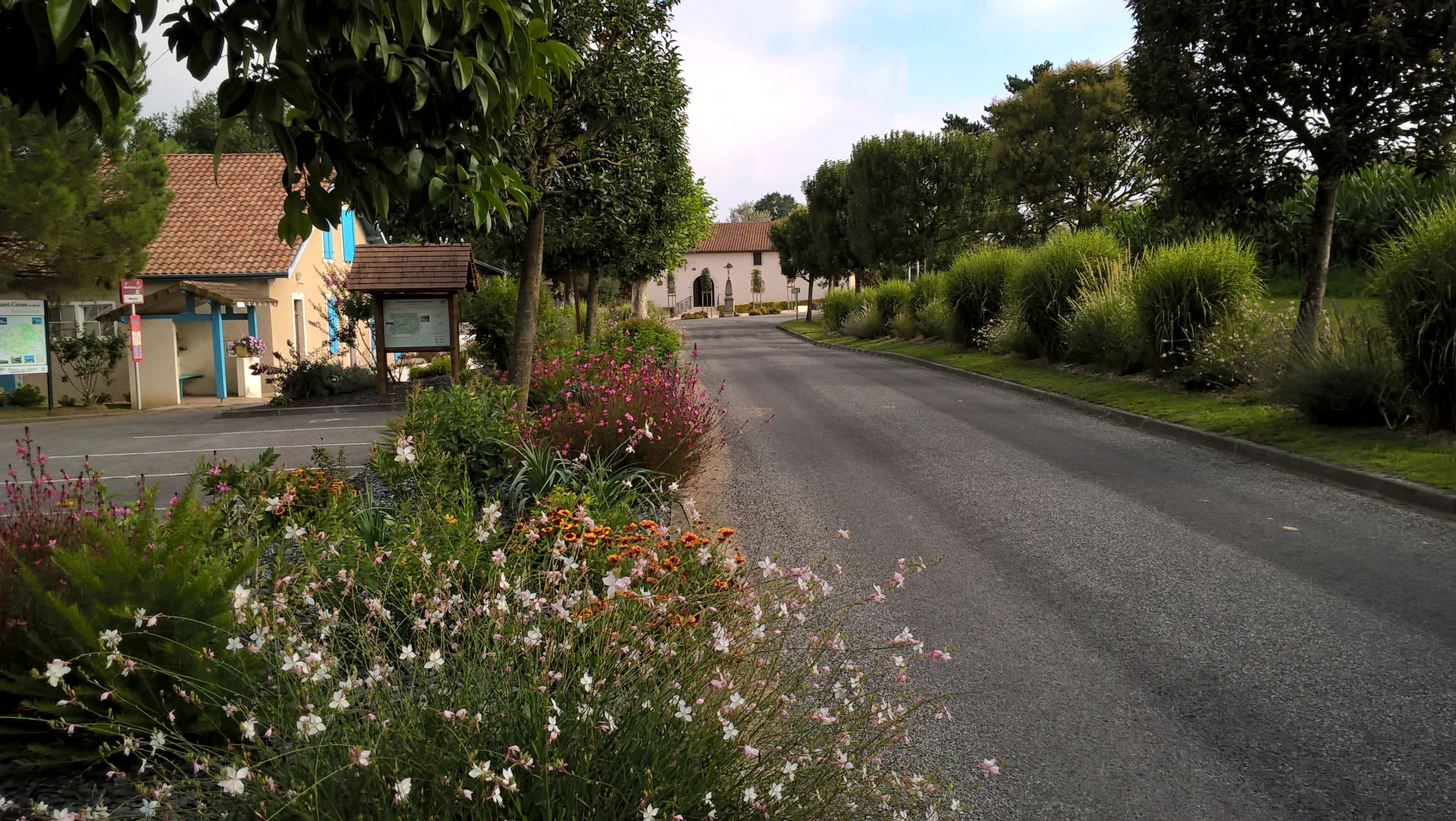
- Location of Saint-Girons-en-Béarn
- Location within France Location within Nouvelle-Aquitaine
- Coordinates: 43°33′18″N 0°49′44″W
- Country: France
- Region: Nouvelle-Aquitaine
- Department: Pyrénées-Atlantiques
- Arrondissement: Pau
- Canton: Orthez et Terres des Gaves et du Sel
- Intercommunality: Lacq-Orthez

Government
  - Mayor (2020–2026): Pierre Lafargue
- Area^{1}: 5.20 km^{2} (2.01 sq mi)
- Elevation: 140 m (460 ft)
- Highest elevation: 156 m (512 ft)
- Lowest elevation: 76 m (249 ft)
- Population (2023): 186
  - Density: 35.8/km^{2} (92.6/sq mi)
- Time zone: UTC+01:00 (CET)
  - Summer (DST): UTC+02:00 (CEST)
- INSEE/Postal code: 64479 /64300
- ^{1} French Land Register data, which excludes lakes, ponds, glaciers > 1 km^{2} (0.386 sq mi or 247 acres) and river estuaries.

Saint-Girons-en-Béarn (French pronunciation: [sɛ̃ ʒiʁɔ̃ ɑ̃ beaʁn], literally Saint-Girons in Béarn; Occitan: Sent Guironç) is a commune in the Pyrénées-Atlantiques department in south-western France.

The commune was formerly called Saint-Girons, and was officially renamed Saint-Girons-en-Béarn on 7 July 2006.

== See also ==
- Communes of the Pyrénées-Atlantiques department
