= Carresse-Cassaber =

- Commune
- Coat of arms
- Location of Carresse-Cassaber
- Location within France Location within Nouvelle-Aquitaine
- Coordinates: 43°28′45″N 0°59′39″W
- Country: France
- Region: Nouvelle-Aquitaine
- Department: Pyrénées-Atlantiques
- Arrondissement: Oloron-Sainte-Marie
- Canton: Orthez et Terres des Gaves et du Sel
- Intercommunality: Béarn des Gaves

Government
  - Mayor (2020–2026): Patrick Loustalet
- Area^{1}: 13.91 km^{2} (5.37 sq mi)
- Elevation: 53 m (174 ft)
- Highest elevation: 135 m (443 ft)
- Lowest elevation: 10 m (33 ft)
- Population (2023): 664
  - Density: 47.7/km^{2} (124/sq mi)
- Time zone: UTC+01:00 (CET)
  - Summer (DST): UTC+02:00 (CEST)
- INSEE/Postal code: 64168 /64270
- ^{1} French Land Register data, which excludes lakes, ponds, glaciers > 1 km^{2} (0.386 sq mi or 247 acres) and river estuaries.

Carresse-Cassaber (French pronunciation: [kaʁɛs kasabe]; Occitan: Carressa e Cassabè) is a commune in the Pyrénées-Atlantiques department in south-western France. It was created in 1973 by the merger of two former communes: Carresse and Cassaber.

== See also ==
- Communes of the Pyrénées-Atlantiques department
