= Léren =

- Commune
- Location of Léren
- Location within France Location within Nouvelle-Aquitaine
- Coordinates: 43°30′10″N 1°02′37″W
- Country: France
- Region: Nouvelle-Aquitaine
- Department: Pyrénées-Atlantiques
- Arrondissement: Oloron-Sainte-Marie
- Canton: Orthez et Terres des Gaves et du Sel
- Intercommunality: Béarn des Gaves

Government
  - Mayor (2020–2026): Jean Lassalle
- Area^{1}: 4.57 km^{2} (1.76 sq mi)
- Elevation: 12 m (39 ft)
- Highest elevation: 53 m (174 ft)
- Lowest elevation: 7 m (23 ft)
- Population (2023): 210
  - Density: 46/km^{2} (120/sq mi)
- Time zone: UTC+01:00 (CET)
  - Summer (DST): UTC+02:00 (CEST)
- INSEE/Postal code: 64334 /64270
- ^{1} French Land Register data, which excludes lakes, ponds, glaciers > 1 km^{2} (0.386 sq mi or 247 acres) and river estuaries.

Léren (French pronunciation: [leʁɛ̃]; Occitan: Lèren) is a commune in the Pyrénées-Atlantiques department in south-western France.

== See also ==
- Communes of the Pyrénées-Atlantiques department
