= Saint-Boès =

- Commune
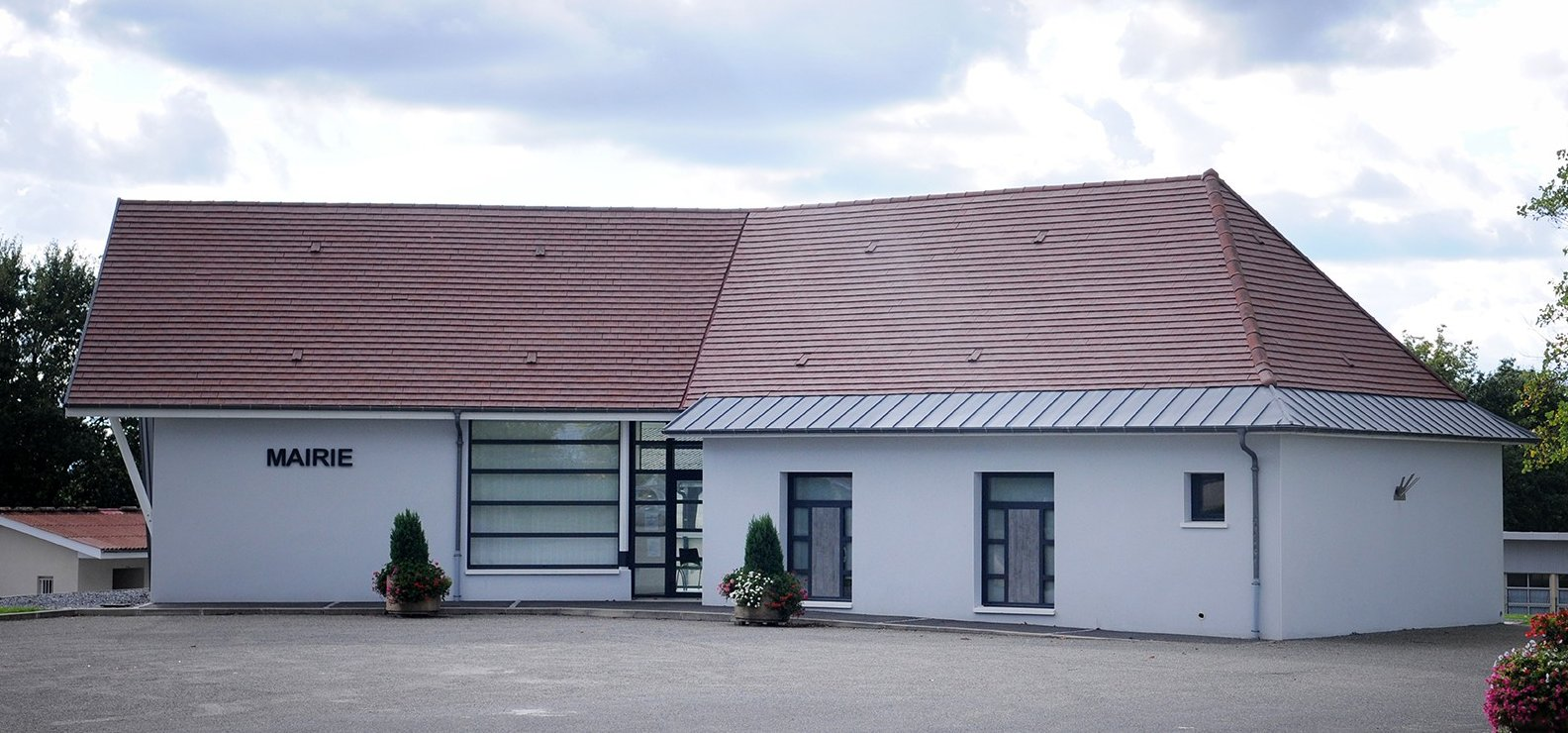
- Saint-Boès Town hall
- Location of Saint-Boès
- Location within France Location within Nouvelle-Aquitaine
- Coordinates: 43°31′39″N 0°48′17″W
- Country: France
- Region: Nouvelle-Aquitaine
- Department: Pyrénées-Atlantiques
- Arrondissement: Pau
- Canton: Orthez et Terres des Gaves et du Sel

Government
  - Mayor (2020–2026): Jean Labaste
- Area^{1}: 9.49 km^{2} (3.66 sq mi)
- Elevation: 122 m (400 ft)
- Highest elevation: 177 m (581 ft)
- Lowest elevation: 65 m (213 ft)
- Population (2023): 376
  - Density: 39.6/km^{2} (103/sq mi)
- Time zone: UTC+01:00 (CET)
  - Summer (DST): UTC+02:00 (CEST)
- INSEE/Postal code: 64471 /64300
- ^{1} French Land Register data, which excludes lakes, ponds, glaciers > 1 km^{2} (0.386 sq mi or 247 acres) and river estuaries.

Saint-Boès (French pronunciation: [sɛ̃ bɔɛs]; Occitan: Semboès) is a commune in the Pyrénées-Atlantiques department in south-western France.

== See also ==
- Communes of the Pyrénées-Atlantiques department
