= Orriule =

- Commune
- Location of Orriule
- Location within France Location within Nouvelle-Aquitaine
- Coordinates: 43°24′25″N 0°51′10″W
- Country: France
- Region: Nouvelle-Aquitaine
- Department: Pyrénées-Atlantiques
- Arrondissement: Oloron-Sainte-Marie
- Canton: Orthez et Terres des Gaves et du Sel
- Intercommunality: Béarn des Gaves

Government
  - Mayor (2020–2026): Eric Laharanne
- Area^{1}: 6.36 km^{2} (2.46 sq mi)
- Elevation: 147 m (482 ft)
- Highest elevation: 240 m (790 ft)
- Lowest elevation: 87 m (285 ft)
- Population (2023): 140
  - Density: 22/km^{2} (57/sq mi)
- Time zone: UTC+01:00 (CET)
  - Summer (DST): UTC+02:00 (CEST)
- INSEE/Postal code: 64428 /64390
- ^{1} French Land Register data, which excludes lakes, ponds, glaciers > 1 km^{2} (0.386 sq mi or 247 acres) and river estuaries.

Orriule (French pronunciation: [ɔʁjyl]; Occitan: Aurriula) is a commune in the Pyrénées-Atlantiques department in south-western France.

== See also ==
- Communes of the Pyrénées-Atlantiques department
