= Escos =

- Commune
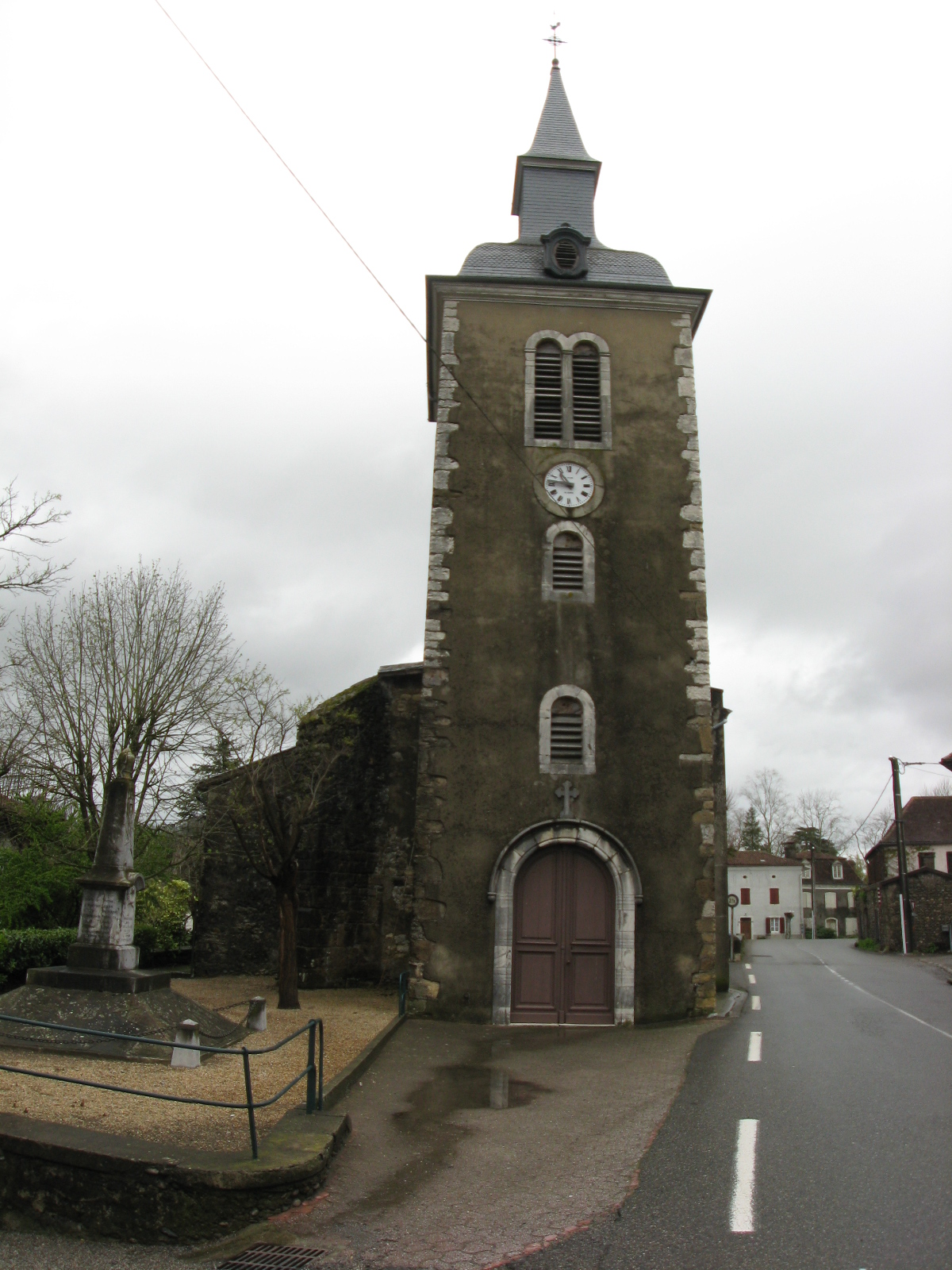
- Church
- Location of Escos
- Location within France Location within Nouvelle-Aquitaine
- Coordinates: 43°26′52″N 0°59′48″W
- Country: France
- Region: Nouvelle-Aquitaine
- Department: Pyrénées-Atlantiques
- Arrondissement: Oloron-Sainte-Marie
- Canton: Orthez et Terres des Gaves et du Sel
- Intercommunality: Béarn des Gaves

Government
  - Mayor (2020–2026): Pierre Villenave
- Area^{1}: 5.61 km^{2} (2.17 sq mi)
- Elevation: 60 m (200 ft)
- Highest elevation: 162 m (531 ft)
- Lowest elevation: 23 m (75 ft)
- Population (2023): 237
  - Density: 42.2/km^{2} (109/sq mi)
- Time zone: UTC+01:00 (CET)
  - Summer (DST): UTC+02:00 (CEST)
- INSEE/Postal code: 64205 /64270
- ^{1} French Land Register data, which excludes lakes, ponds, glaciers > 1 km^{2} (0.386 sq mi or 247 acres) and river estuaries.

Escos (French pronunciation: [ɛskɔs]; Occitan: Escòs; Basque: Ezkoze) is a commune in the Pyrénées-Atlantiques department in south-western France.

== See also ==
- Communes of the Pyrénées-Atlantiques department
