= Ramous =

- Commune
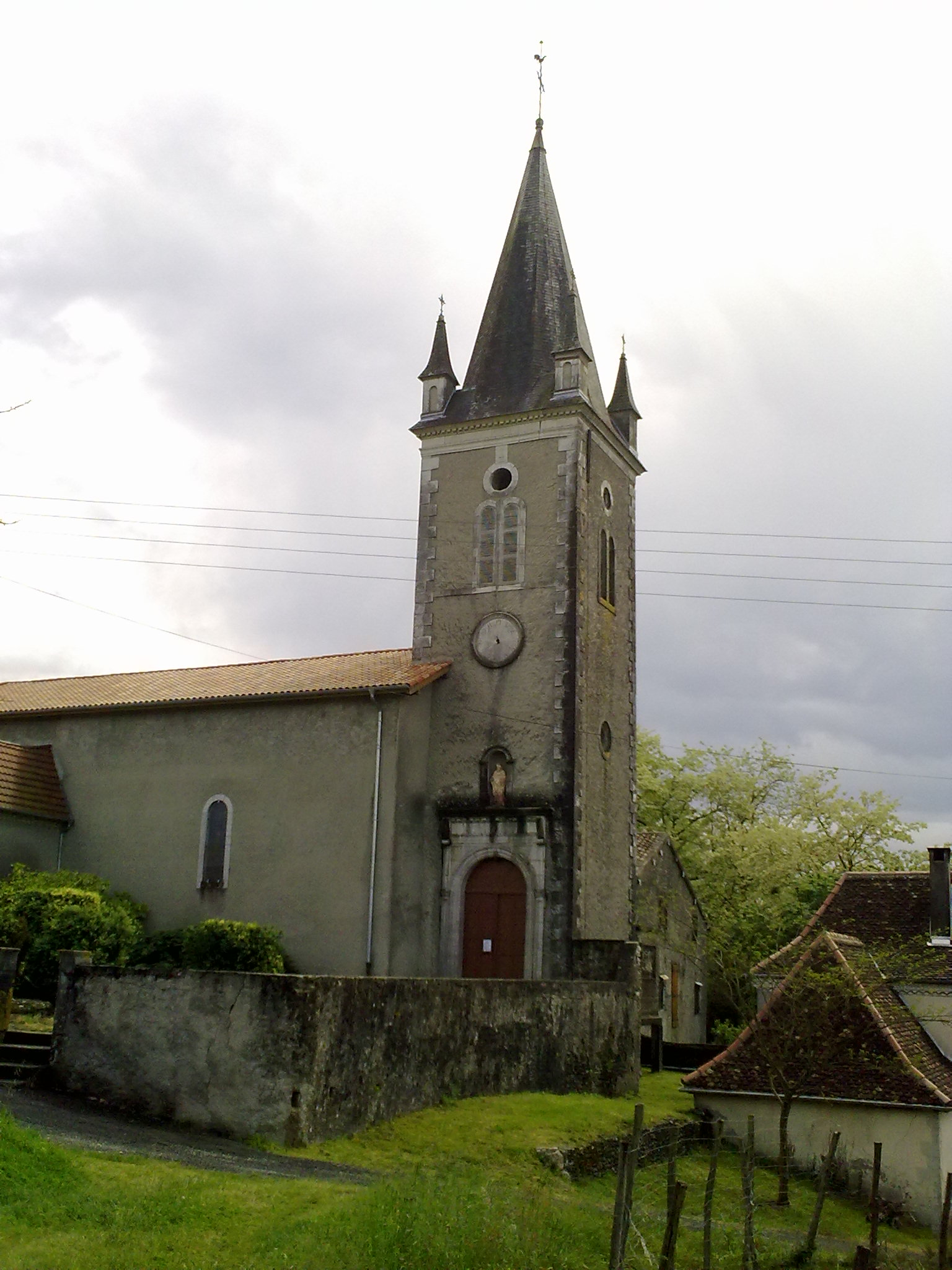
- Church
- Location of Ramous
- Location within France Location within Nouvelle-Aquitaine
- Coordinates: 43°31′N 0°53′W
- Country: France
- Region: Nouvelle-Aquitaine
- Department: Pyrénées-Atlantiques
- Arrondissement: Pau
- Canton: Orthez et Terres des Gaves et du Sel
- Intercommunality: Lacq-Orthez

Government
  - Mayor (2024–2026): Sylvie Darrieu
- Area^{1}: 7.58 km^{2} (2.93 sq mi)
- Elevation: 42 m (138 ft)
- Highest elevation: 156 m (512 ft)
- Lowest elevation: 24 m (79 ft)
- Population (2023): 470
  - Density: 62/km^{2} (160/sq mi)
- Time zone: UTC+01:00 (CET)
  - Summer (DST): UTC+02:00 (CEST)
- INSEE/Postal code: 64462 /64270
- ^{1} French Land Register data, which excludes lakes, ponds, glaciers > 1 km^{2} (0.386 sq mi or 247 acres) and river estuaries.

Ramous is a commune in the Pyrénées-Atlantiques department in south-western France.

== See also ==
- Communes of the Pyrénées-Atlantiques department
