= L'Hôpital-d'Orion =

- Commune
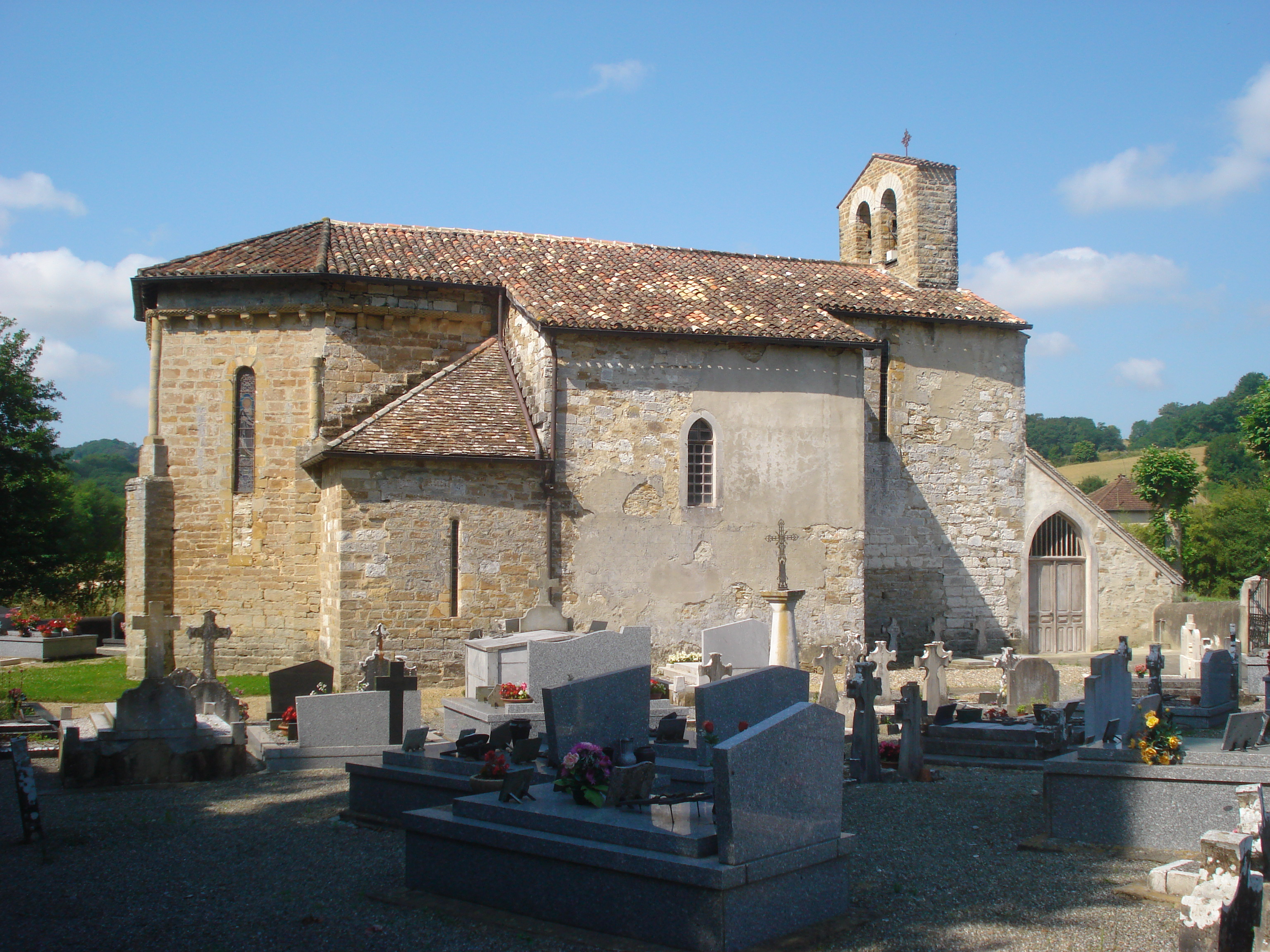
- The church of Sainte-Marie-Madeleine

- Coat of arms
- Location of L'Hôpital-d'Orion
- Location within France Location within Nouvelle-Aquitaine
- Coordinates: 43°26′18″N 0°50′42″W
- Country: France
- Region: Nouvelle-Aquitaine
- Department: Pyrénées-Atlantiques
- Arrondissement: Oloron-Sainte-Marie
- Canton: Orthez et Terres des Gaves et du Sel
- Intercommunality: Béarn des Gaves

Government
  - Mayor (2020–2026): Daniel Lafourcade
- Area^{1}: 8.47 km^{2} (3.27 sq mi)
- Elevation: 136 m (446 ft)
- Highest elevation: 207 m (679 ft)
- Lowest elevation: 71 m (233 ft)
- Population (2023): 136
  - Density: 16.1/km^{2} (41.6/sq mi)
- Time zone: UTC+01:00 (CET)
  - Summer (DST): UTC+02:00 (CEST)
- INSEE/Postal code: 64263 /64270
- ^{1} French Land Register data, which excludes lakes, ponds, glaciers > 1 km^{2} (0.386 sq mi or 247 acres) and river estuaries.

L'Hôpital-d'Orion (French pronunciation: [lopital dɔʁjɔ̃], literally L'Hôpital of Orion; Occitan: L'Espitau d'Orion) is a commune in the Pyrénées-Atlantiques department in south-western France.

== See also ==
- Communes of the Pyrénées-Atlantiques department
