= Montfort, Pyrénées-Atlantiques =

Montfort
- Commune
- Location of Montfort
- Location within France Location within Nouvelle-Aquitaine
- Coordinates: 43°22′09″N 0°50′43″W
- Country: France
- Region: Nouvelle-Aquitaine
- Department: Pyrénées-Atlantiques
- Arrondissement: Oloron-Sainte-Marie
- Canton: Orthez et Terres des Gaves et du Sel
- Intercommunality: Béarn des Gaves

Government
  - Mayor (2020–2026): Jany Fatigue
- Area^{1}: 8.64 km^{2} (3.34 sq mi)
- Elevation: 137 m (449 ft)
- Highest elevation: 194 m (636 ft)
- Lowest elevation: 65 m (213 ft)
- Population (2023): 196
  - Density: 22.7/km^{2} (58.8/sq mi)
- Time zone: UTC+01:00 (CET)
  - Summer (DST): UTC+02:00 (CEST)
- INSEE/Postal code: 64403 /64190
- ^{1} French Land Register data, which excludes lakes, ponds, glaciers > 1 km^{2} (0.386 sq mi or 247 acres) and river estuaries.

Montfort (French pronunciation: [mɔ̃fɔʁ]; Occitan: Monthòrt) is a commune in the Pyrénées-Atlantiques department in south-western France.

== See also ==
- Communes of the Pyrénées-Atlantiques department
