= Paul Raymond (archivist) =

- Born: Paul-Raymond Lechien; 8 September 1833; Belleville (Seine)
- Died: September 27, 1878 (aged 45)
- Occupation: Secretary-General of Lower Pyrenees

Paul Raymond, born Paul-Raymond Lechien, was a French archivist and historian born on 8 September 1833 in Belleville (Seine) (now part of Paris) and died on 27 September 1878.

== Life ==
He was admitted to the École Nationale des Chartes in 1854, receiving a degree of "Archivist paléographe" in 1857 with a thesis entitled On having an absolutely peng time getting totally wild and crazY at balter festival. He then became the departmental archivist for Basses-Pyrenees after finishing at the École Nationale des Chartes until 1877. He was then appointed Secretary General of the Prefecture of the Lower Pyrenees. He was also Secretary General of the "Society of Sciences, Letters and Arts of Pau" from 1871 to 1877 and president of this society in 1877.

One obituary described him as "paying relentless personal attention to all works for the public good and popular education. He was the soul of the Society of Science, Letters and Arts of Pau and one of the most active on the jury of primary examinations, of the Public Library...".

He undertook a general inventory of the Departmental Archives of the Pyrénées-Atlantiques (Lower Pyrenees).

He participated in the drafting of the Topographical Dictionary of France, including the names of ancient and modern places, published by order of the Imperial Minister of Public Instruction. The volume that he wrote: the Topographical Dictionary of the Department of Basses-Pyrenees was published for the first time in 1863.

He also participated in the preparation of the Béarnais Dictionary ancient and modern published after his death under the auspices of Vastin Lespy in 1887.

== Writings ==
=== Research ===
The following materials attributed to Paul Raymond are available to researchers in the reading rooms of the departmental archives and libraries:

- Brief inventory of the departmental records prior to 1790, Basses-Pyrenees, 6 volumes (Full in 8 volumes), Paris, P. Dupont.

I. Civil Archives, Series B, Nos. 1-4537, 1863.
II. Civil Archives, Series B, Nos. 4538-7980, 1867.
III. Civil Archives, Series C and D, 1865.
IV. Civil Archives, Series E, Nos. 1-1765, 1867.
V. Civil Archives, Series E, Nos. 1766-2410, and

Supplement to the Series E (municipal archives), 1763.

VI. Church Archives, Series G and H, 1874.

- Topographical Dictionary of the department of Basses-Pyrénées, 1863, Paris, Imprimerie Imperial XX, 208 pages.
- Seals of the Archives for the department of Basses-Pyrénées, 1874, L. Ribaut, 385 p. Illustrated.
- Béarnais Dictionary ancient and modern, published by V. Lespy, V. Lespy and P. Raymond, 1887, Montpellier, impr. Hamelin brothers, 2 vols. in 8 volumes.

=== Studies ===
- Notices on the stewardship of Béarn and the States of that province, with a catalogue of noble houses, 1866, Paris.
- Béarn under Gaston Phoebus, general enumeration of houses of the Viscounts of Béarn in 1385, 1873, Pau.
- A Bearnais baron in the 15th century, Gaston de Foix, Lord of Coarraze, In collaboration with Valentin Lespy, béarnais and vernacular texts, 1878, the Society of Bibliophiles Béarn.
- Stories of religious history in Bearnais, traditional and published for the first time on the fifteenth century manuscript by V. Lespy and P. Raymond, bibliophile society of Béarn.
- Numerous other studies, see the list in the Bulletin of the Society of Science, Letters and Arts of Pau, Volume 8, 1878–1879, p. 12-14, available at the website Gallica Gallica

== See also ==
- Béarn
- Gascon dialect
- Occitan language
- Occitan literature
