= Aren, Pyrénées-Atlantiques =

Aren
- Commune
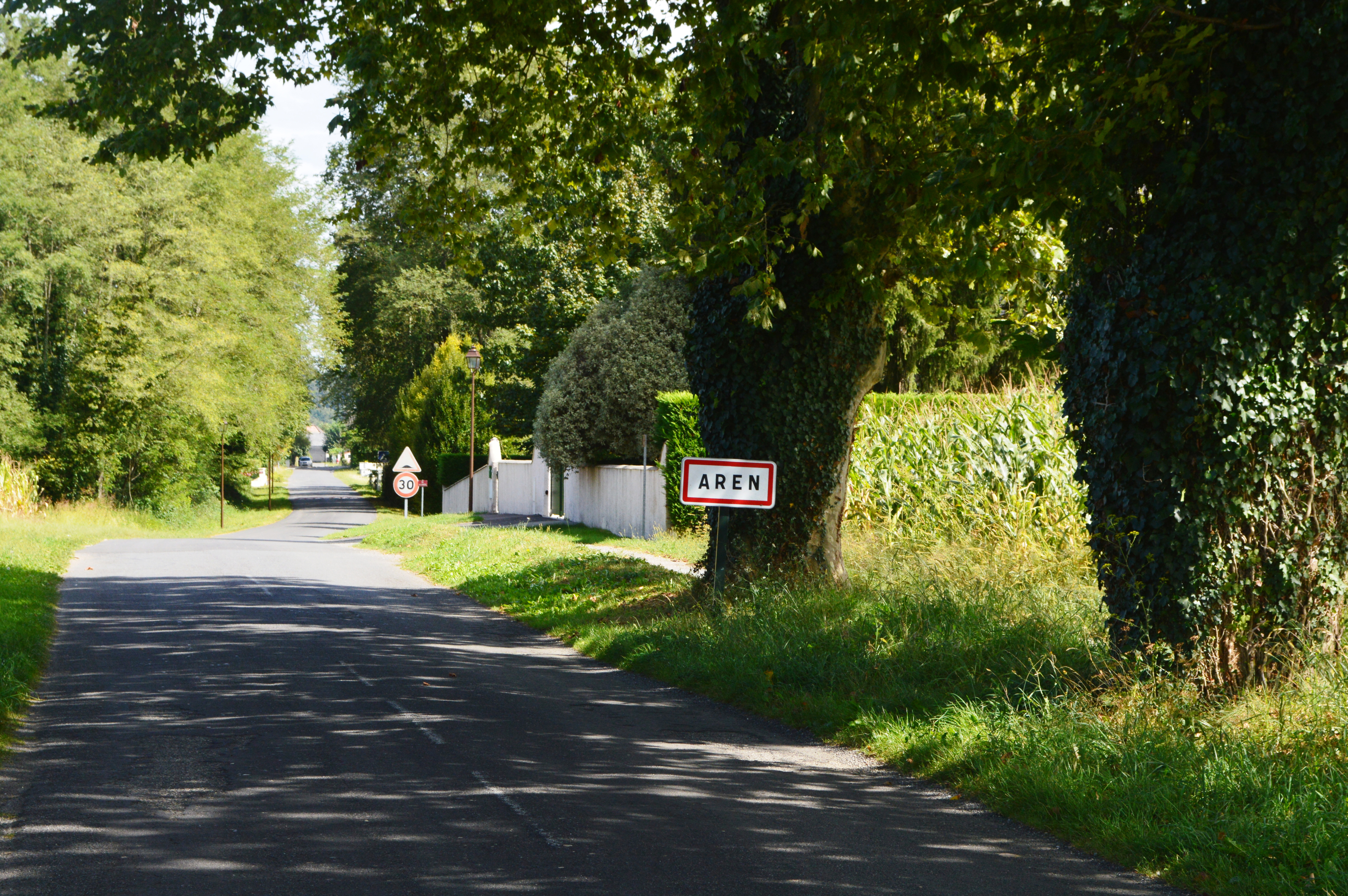
- The road into Aren
- Location of Aren
- Location within France Location within Nouvelle-Aquitaine
- Coordinates: 43°15′43″N 0°41′14″W
- Country: France
- Region: Nouvelle-Aquitaine
- Department: Pyrénées-Atlantiques
- Arrondissement: Oloron-Sainte-Marie
- Canton: Oloron-Sainte-Marie-1
- Intercommunality: Haut Béarn

Government
  - Mayor (2024–2026): Gilbert Hondareite
- Area^{1}: 7.39 km^{2} (2.85 sq mi)
- Elevation: 205 m (673 ft)
- Highest elevation: 269 m (883 ft)
- Lowest elevation: 154 m (505 ft)
- Population (2023): 246
  - Density: 33.3/km^{2} (86.2/sq mi)
- Time zone: UTC+01:00 (CET)
  - Summer (DST): UTC+02:00 (CEST)
- INSEE/Postal code: 64039 /64400
- ^{1} French Land Register data, which excludes lakes, ponds, glaciers > 1 km^{2} (0.386 sq mi or 247 acres) and river estuaries.

Aren is a commune in the Pyrénées-Atlantiques department in the Nouvelle-Aquitaine region of south-western France. It is part of the urban area (aire d'attraction des villes) of Oloron-Sainte-Marie.

== Geography ==
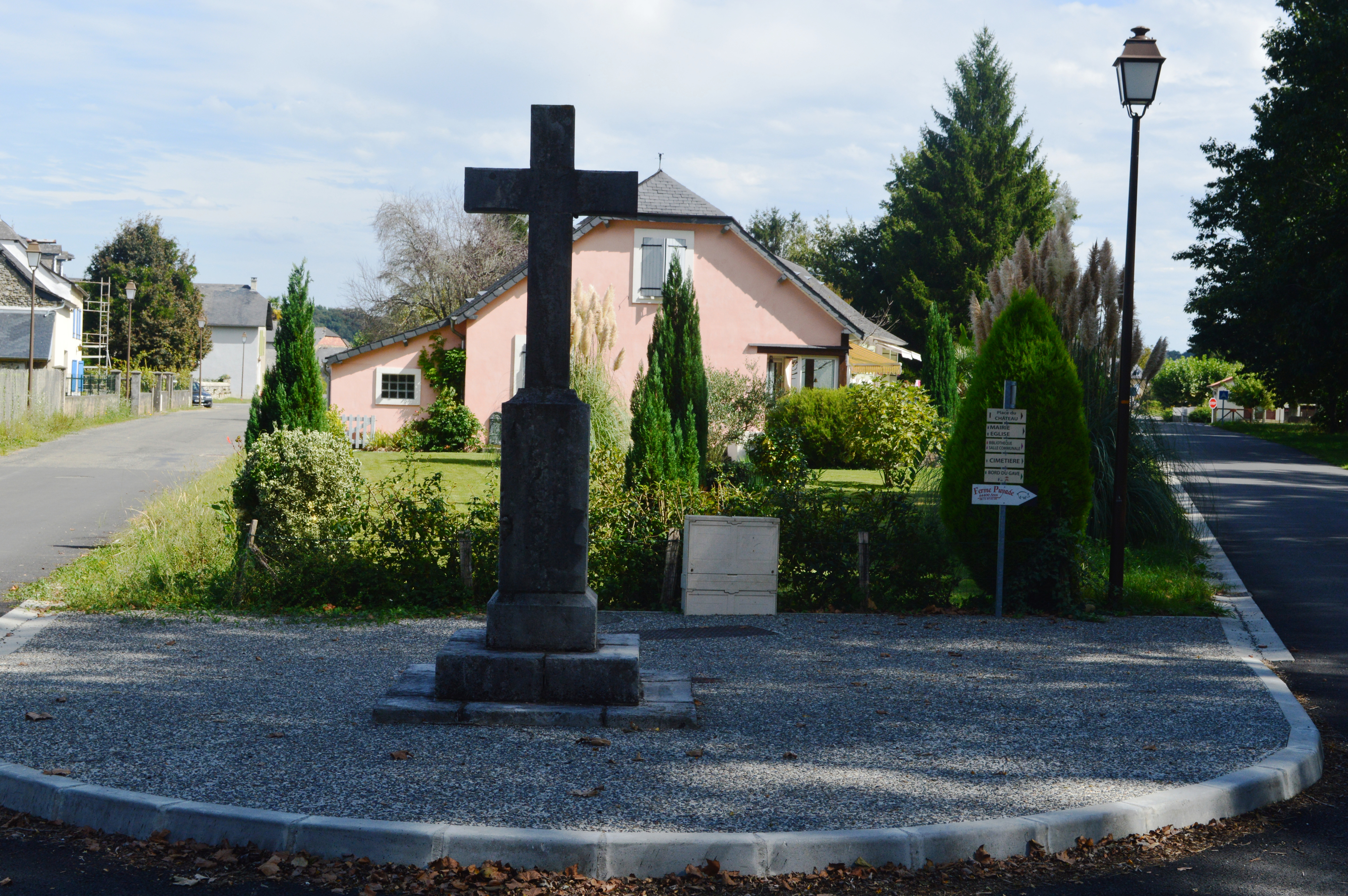
A Wayside Cross in Aren

Aren is located some 14 km north-west of Oloron-Sainte-Marie immediately south of Saucède. The commune is divided into two portions - the eastern portion contains the village and is bordered in the north and east by the Gave d'Oloron. This portion is connected to the western part located to the west of the Joos river by the D325 road (which is part of the commune). Access to the commune is by the D936 road which crosses the "neck" of the commune and connects to the D325 road which goes east to the village. The D59 road also goes from the village south-west to Saint-Goin. The D25 also connects the "neck" of the commune to Préchacq-Josbaig in the north and crosses the Gave-d'Oleron north of this village - the nearest river crossing to the commune. The eastern portion of the commune consists of the village and farmland. The western portion, which has no hamlets, is heavily forested with some 30% of farmland.

Aren was part of the former arrondissement which grouped together the communes of Aren, Esquiule, Géronce, Geüs-d'Oloron, Orin, Préchacq-Josbaig, and Saint-Goin.

The commune lies in the Drainage basin of the Adour and the Gave d'Oloron flows from south to north then turns east at the northern border of the commune. The Joos river flows north across the "neck" of the commune and joins the Gave-d'Oloron north of Prechacq-Josbaig. In the western portion of the commune numerous streams rise including the Ibarle and the Larribau which all flow north eventually to join the Gave d'Oloron.

=== Places and Hamlets ===
- Arnabaigt
- Arroutis
- Bagolle
- Bugala
- La Campagne de Préchacq
- Estremeres
- Hippolyte
- Lannes
- Larraillet
- Loustalet
- Mirande
- La Naü
- Puheu
- Tatieu
- Vital

== Toponymy ==
The commune name in béarnais is also Aren. Brigitte Jobbé-Duval indicated that the toponym Aren probably means domain of Arrius, the name of a former owner, who Michel Grosclaude called Arennius.

The following table details the origins of the commune name and other names in the commune.

Name	Spelling	Date	Source	Page	Origin	Description
Aren	Aren	1209	Raymond	9	Oloron	Village
	Aren	1251	Grosclaude			
	Aren	1385	Grosclaude		Census	
	Saint-Jean-d'Aren	1608	Raymond	9	Insinuations	
	Aren	1750	Cassini			
Le Castet	Le Castet	1538	Raymond	45	Reformation	Fief, Vassal of the Viscounts of Béarn

Sources:

- Raymond: Topographic Dictionary of the Department of Basses-Pyrenees, 1863, on the page numbers indicated in the table. (in French)
- Grosclaude: Toponymic Dictionary of communes, Béarn, 2006 (in French)
- Cassini: Cassini Map from 1750

Origins:

- Oloron: Cartulary of Oloron
- Census: Census of Béarn
- Insinuations: Insinuations of the Diocese of Oloron
- Reformation: Reformation of Béarn

== History ==
Paul Raymond noted on page 9 of his 1863 dictionary that in 1385 Aren had 23 fires and depended on the bailiwick of Oloron. The barony, which was established in 1658, was a vassal of the Viscounts of Béarn.

== Administration ==
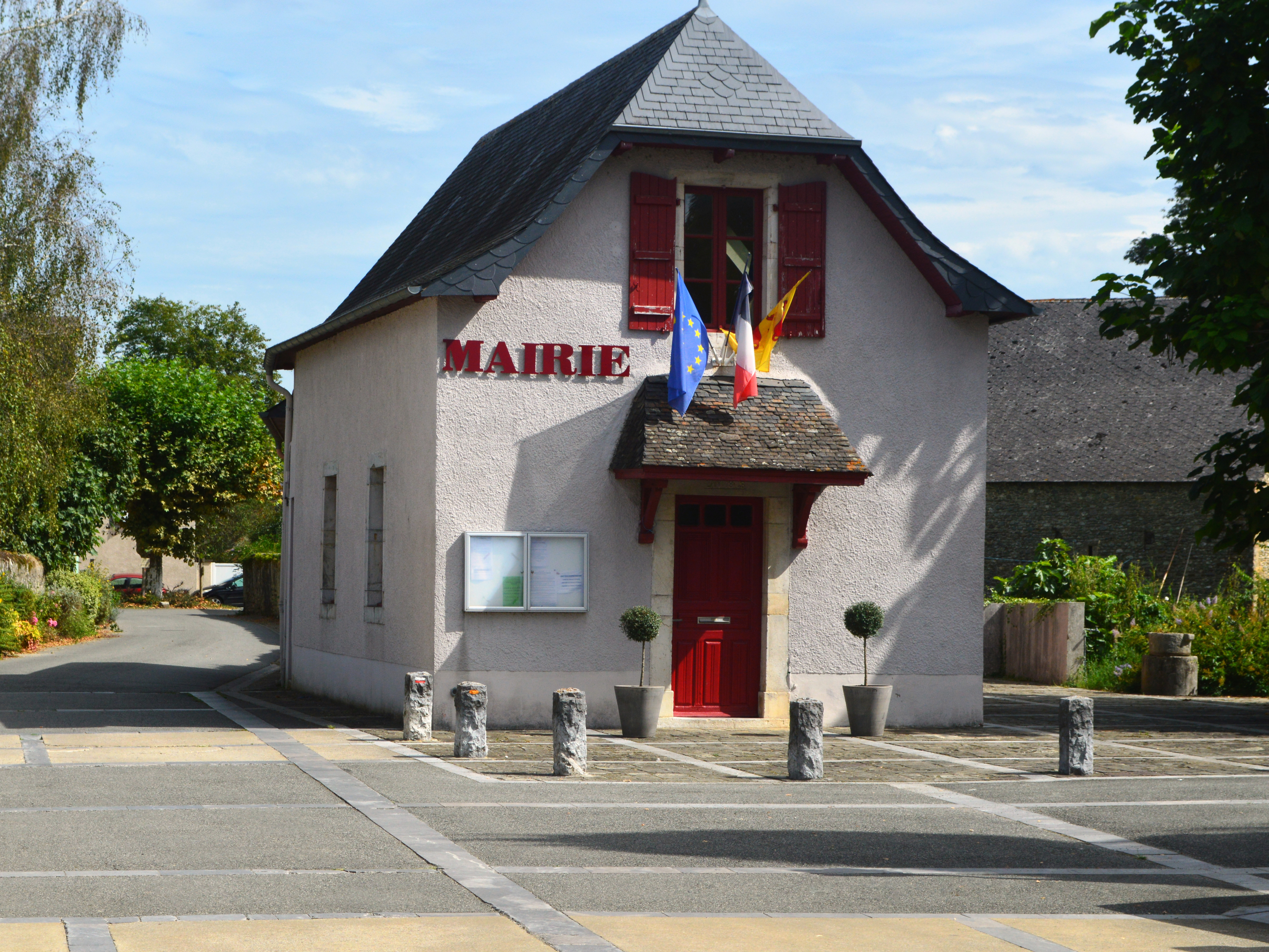
The Town Hall

List of Successive Mayors

From	To	Name
1983	2008	Jean Mirande
2008	2011	Gérard Hazas
2011	2024	David Mirande
2024	2026	Gilbert Hondareite

=== Inter-communality ===
The town is part of four inter-communal structures:

- the Communauté de communes du Haut Béarn;
- the AEP association of Aren-Préchacq-Josbaig;
- the energy association of Pyrénées-Atlantiques;
- the mixed association for oak forestry in the Basque and Béarn valleys.

== Demography ==
The inhabitants of the commune are known as Arenais or Arenaises in French.

Historical population

Year	Pop.	±% p.a.
1793	337	—
1821	391	+0.53%
1846	385	−0.06%
1872	270	−1.36%
1901	282	+0.15%
1926	253	−0.43%
1946	211	−0.90%
1962	175	−1.16%
1968	154	−2.11%

Year	Pop.	±% p.a.
1975	143	−1.05%
1982	158	+1.44%
1990	185	+1.99%
1999	180	−0.30%
2007	189	+0.61%
2012	244	+5.24%
2017	246	+0.16%
2023	246	+0.00%

Source: EHESS and INSEE (1968-2023)

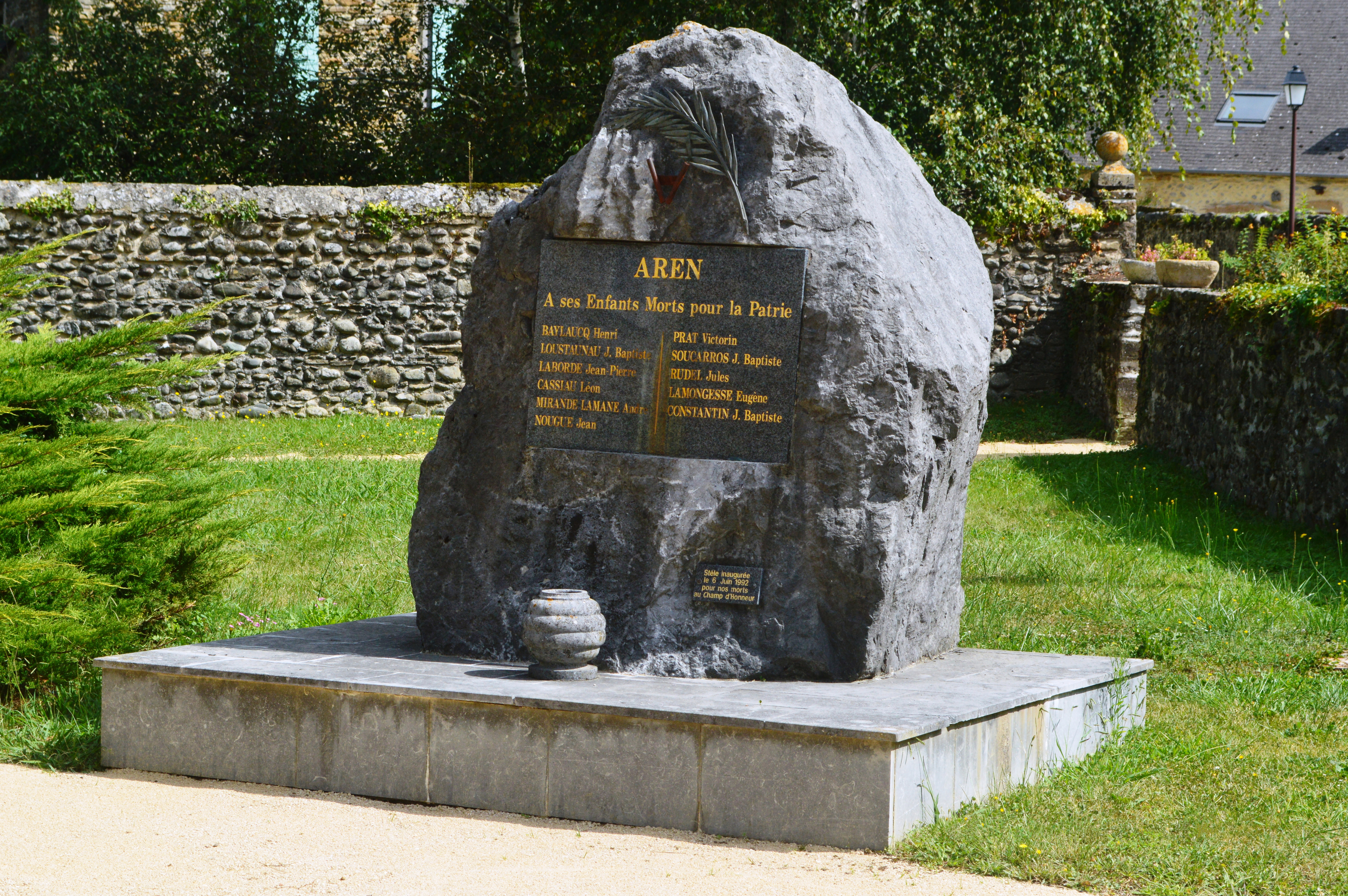
Aren War Memorial

== Economy ==
Economic activity is mainly agricultural (livestock, pasturage, polyculture). The town is part of the Appellation d'origine contrôlée (AOC) zone designation of Ossau-iraty.

== Culture and Heritage ==
The patron saint of Aren is John the Baptist.

A village festival takes place on the last Sunday of June .

=== Civil heritage ===
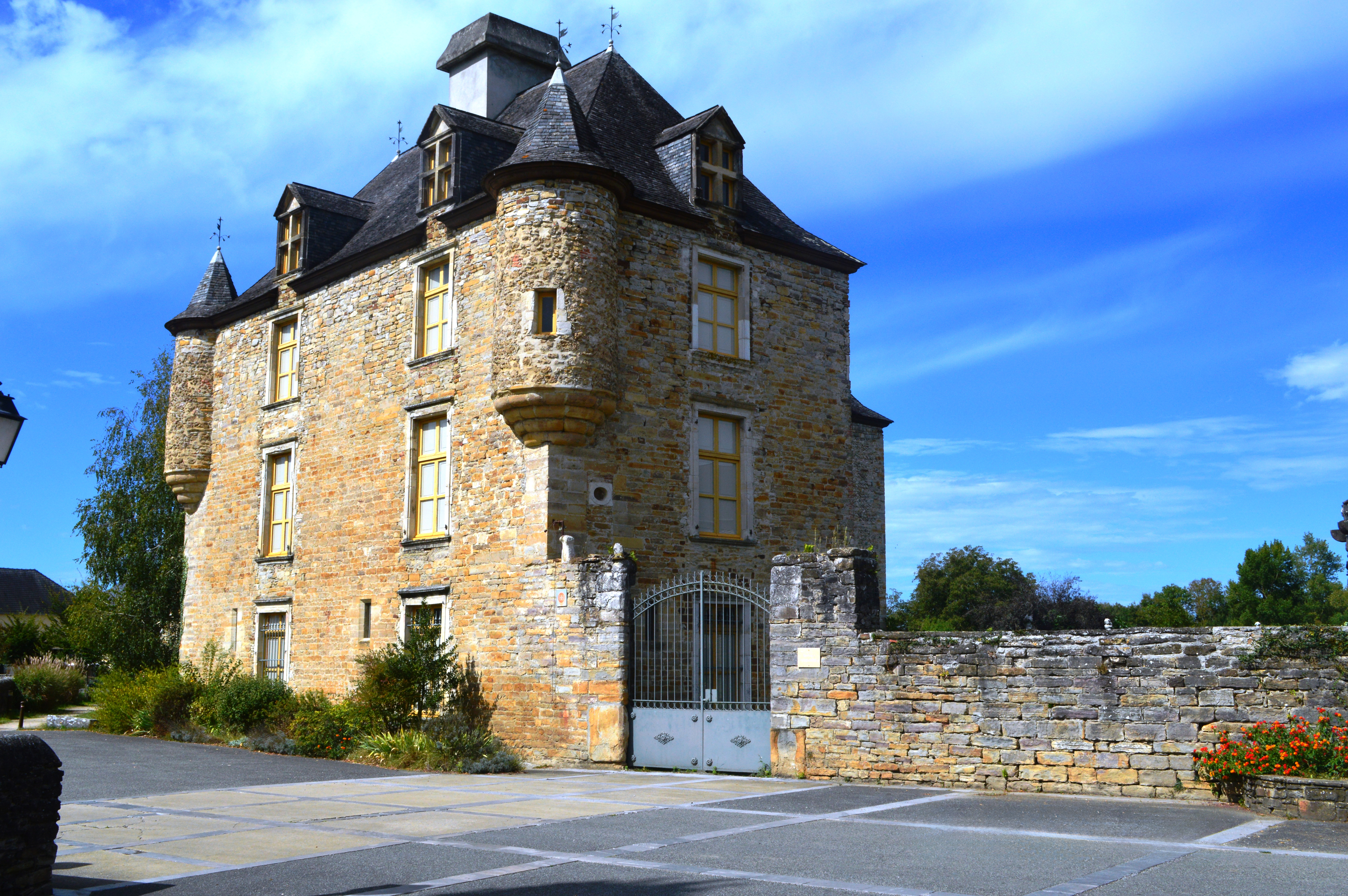
The Chateau of Aren

The Chateau of Aren (15th century) is registered as an historical monument.

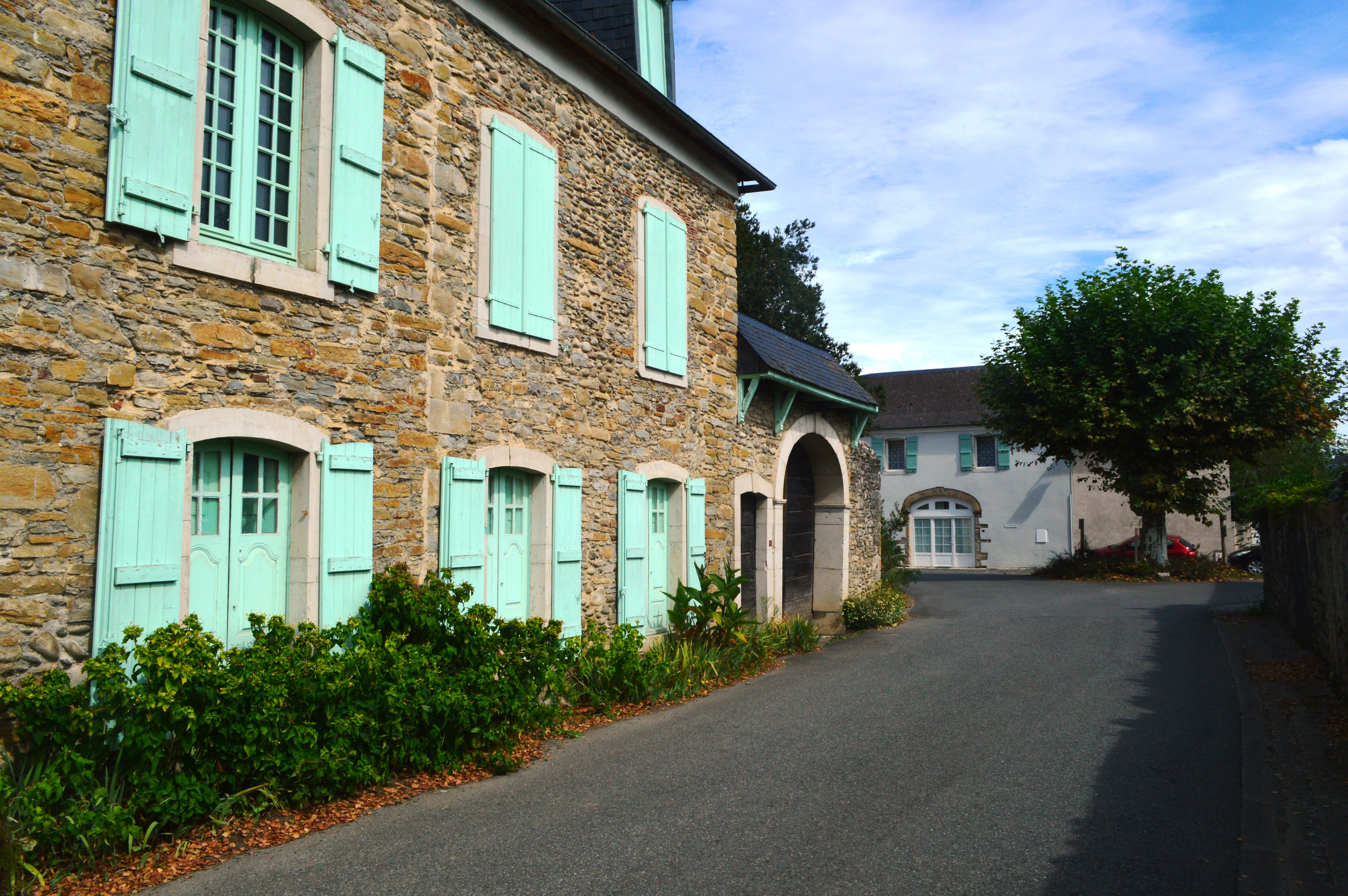
Old House in Aren

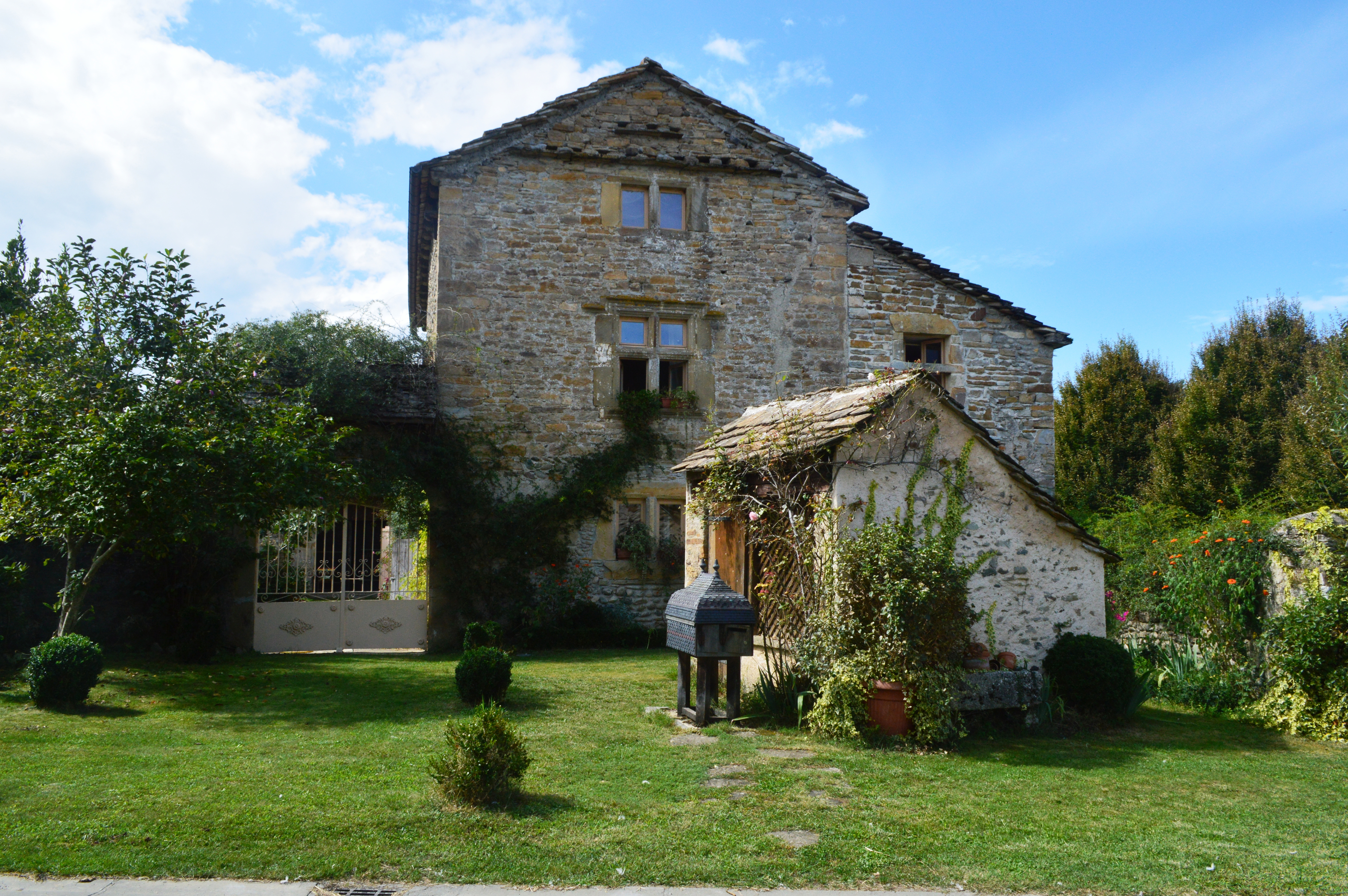
Old House in Aren

There are several old houses in the village which were counted in the census of Gaston Fébus in 1385 called Ploo, Carrere, and Paletz. Under the Viscounts of Béarn the inhabitants of Jaca were relocated to the commune and the mode of construction of the houses, uniquely in the Josbaig Valley, is similar to the Canfrance region and Jaca.

=== Religious heritage ===
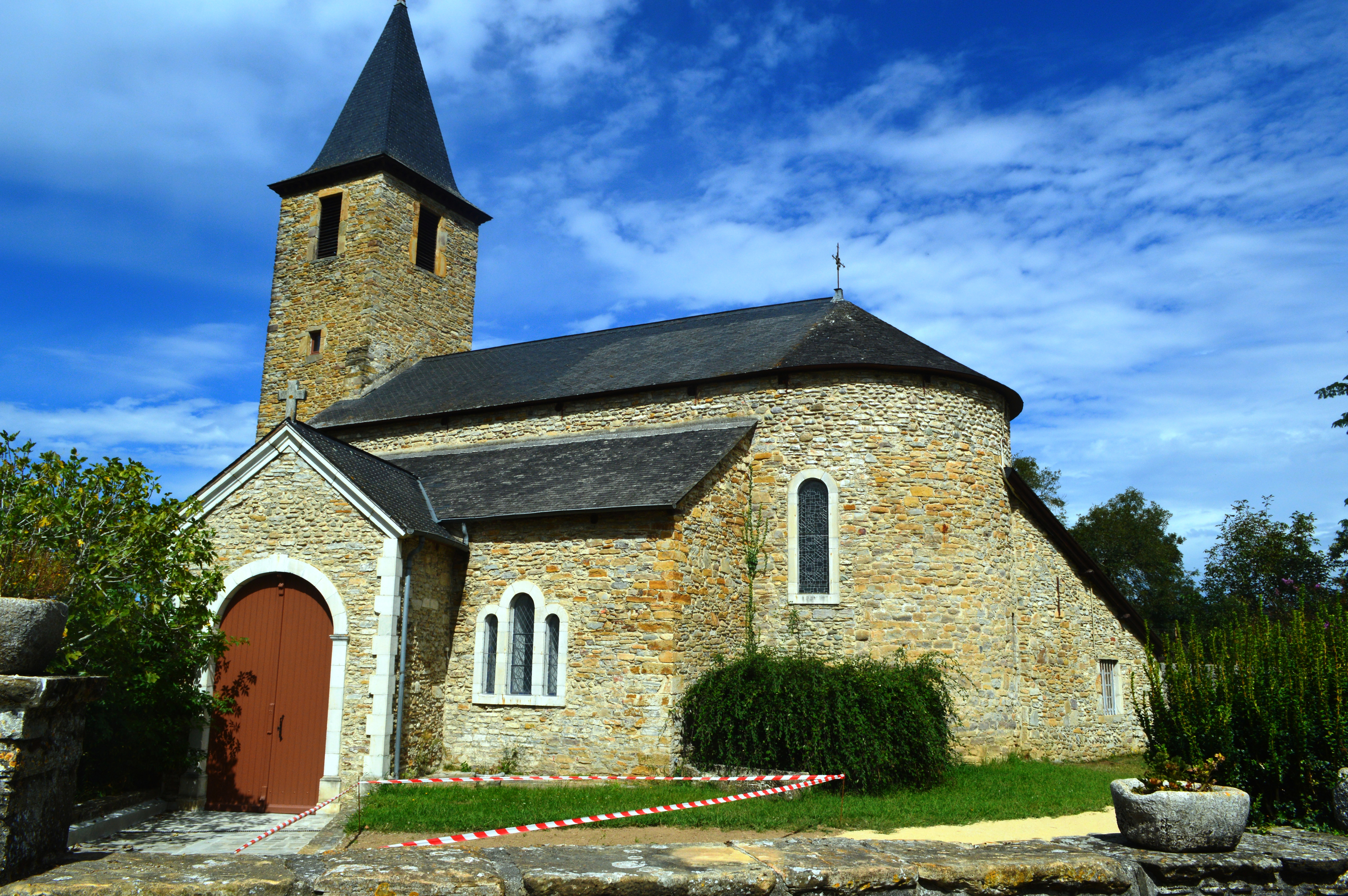
The Church of Saint John the Baptist

The Church of Saint John the Baptist (19th century) is registered as an historical monument.

=== Environmental heritage ===
The hiking trail GR78 crosses the territory of the commune.

== Notable people linked to the commune ==
- Aren Stinger

== See also ==
- Communes of the Pyrénées-Atlantiques department
