= Géronce =

- Commune
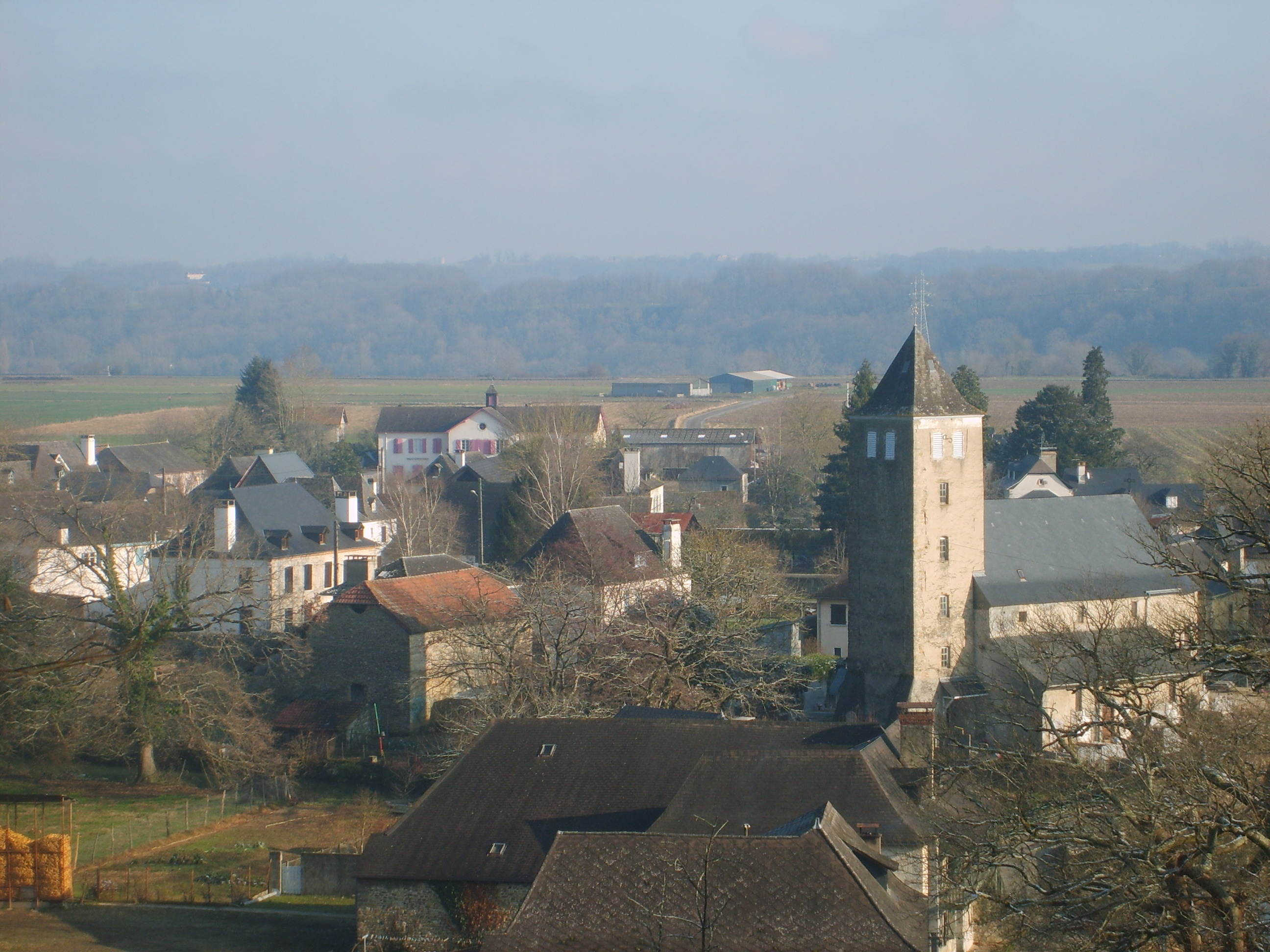
- The village of Géronce
- Location of Géronce
- Location within France Location within Nouvelle-Aquitaine
- Coordinates: 43°14′28″N 0°41′22″W
- Country: France
- Region: Nouvelle-Aquitaine
- Department: Pyrénées-Atlantiques
- Arrondissement: Oloron-Sainte-Marie
- Canton: Oloron-Sainte-Marie-1
- Intercommunality: CC Haut Béarn

Government
  - Mayor (2020–2026): Michel Contou-Carrère
- Area^{1}: 15.99 km^{2} (6.17 sq mi)
- Elevation: 202 m (663 ft)
- Highest elevation: 290 m (950 ft)
- Lowest elevation: 167 m (548 ft)
- Population (2023): 492
  - Density: 30.8/km^{2} (79.7/sq mi)
- Time zone: UTC+01:00 (CET)
  - Summer (DST): UTC+02:00 (CEST)
- INSEE/Postal code: 64241 /64400
- ^{1} French Land Register data, which excludes lakes, ponds, glaciers > 1 km^{2} (0.386 sq mi or 247 acres) and river estuaries.

Géronce (French pronunciation: [ʒeʁɔ̃s]; Gascon: Geronce; Basque: Jeruntze) is a commune in the Pyrénées-Atlantiques department in south-western France.

== Geography ==
=== Access ===
There are several routes leading in and out of Géronce. Route 936 linking Oloron-Sainte-Marie and Bayonne passes by the outside of the town. Route 836 passes through the middle of Géronce and links route 936 through roundabouts at Orin and at Geüs-d'Oloron. Highway 524 passes through the neighborhoods of Urein, Dous, Castéra, and Lacé, and links route 836 to route 24 via Esquiule and Barcus.

=== Water ===
The Gave d'Oloron (a tributary of the Gave de Pau) flows through the commune, as well as its tributary Joos, and its tributaries, the streams of Josset and Cambillou.

== See also ==
- Communes of the Pyrénées-Atlantiques department
