= Barcus =

Barcus Barkoxe
- Commune
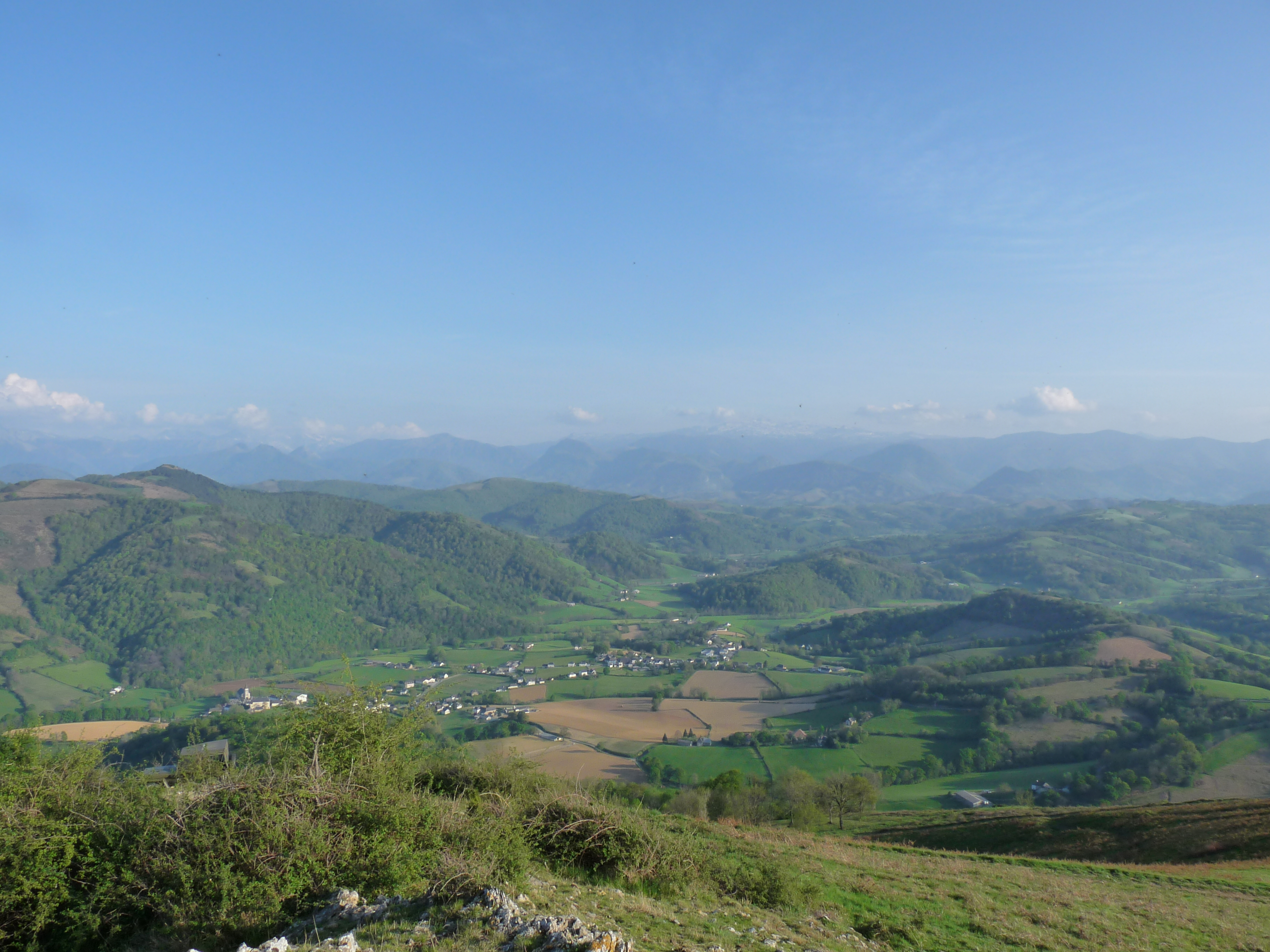
- A general view of Barcus
- Location of Barcus
- Location within France Location within Nouvelle-Aquitaine
- Coordinates: 43°11′23″N 0°46′16″W
- Country: France
- Region: Nouvelle-Aquitaine
- Department: Pyrénées-Atlantiques
- Arrondissement: Oloron-Sainte-Marie
- Canton: Montagne Basque
- Intercommunality: CA Pays Basque

Government
  - Mayor (2020–2026): Jean-Marc Baranthol
- Area^{1}: 46.93 km^{2} (18.12 sq mi)
- Elevation: 328 m (1,076 ft)
- Highest elevation: 793 m (2,602 ft)
- Lowest elevation: 176 m (577 ft)
- Population (2023): 654
  - Density: 13.9/km^{2} (36.1/sq mi)
- Time zone: UTC+01:00 (CET)
  - Summer (DST): UTC+02:00 (CEST)
- INSEE/Postal code: 64093 /64130
- ^{1} French Land Register data, which excludes lakes, ponds, glaciers > 1 km^{2} (0.386 sq mi or 247 acres) and river estuaries.

Barcus (French pronunciation: [baʁkys]; Occitan: Barcús; Basque: Barkoxe) is a commune in the Pyrénées-Atlantiques department in the Nouvelle-Aquitaine region of southwestern France in the former province of Soule.

== Geography ==
=== Location ===
Barcus is located in the Massif des Arbailles in the former province of Soule some 25 km south by south-east of Sauveterre-de-Béarn and 12 km west of Oloron-Sainte-Marie. The commune covers a complex of valleys formed by the course of the Joos and its left and right tributaries - the Paradis district, for example, is located on the Ibarra and the former hamlet of Guibelhéguiet is on a tributary of the Joos.

=== Access ===
Access to the commune is by the D24 road from Chéraute in the west which passes through the centre of the commune and continues east to Esquiule. The D347 branches from the D26 west of the village and goes south to Tardets-Sorholus. The D59 comes from Saint-Goin in the north-east through the village and continues south down the eastern side of the commune to Montory. The D859 branches off the D59 in the north of the commune and goes north to join the D25 north of the commune. The D159 branches off the D59 halfway down the commune and goes east to join the D24 east of Esquiule. The D459 branches off the D59 in the south of the commune and goes south-east to Lanne-en-Barétous.

=== Hydrography ===
The commune is located in the drainage basin of the Adour. The Joos river rises west of the commune and flows east across the commune then north, forming the eastern border of the commune, continuing north-east to eventually join the Gave d'Oloron at Préchacq-Josbaig. Many tributaries rise in the commune and flow east into the Joos including the Bouhatéko erreka, the arréc of Etchanchu, the Handia, the Oyhanart erreka, the arriou of Soulou, the Sustaris erreka, and the Ibarra stream (7 km long) with its tributaries, the Ruisseau Ibarra (4.4 km, which is joined in the commune by the Askontchilo erreka and the Athaketa stream) and the Lecheguita stream (also with its tributary the Ilharra stream). Paul Raymond mentioned another tributary of the Joos crossing Barcus called the Guibéléguiet with its tributary the Paradis.

Tributaries of the Lausset, which also flows into the Gave d'Oloron, also pass through the commune such as the Ascania stream and the Ibarle stream with its tributary the Ambelseko erreka.

Finally the Ruisseau de Lacoste, a sub-tributary of the arréc of Bitole also crosses the commune.

=== Places and Hamlets ===
There are a large number of places and hamlets in the commune:

- Agaras
- Agor (border)
- Agorria
- Aguerborda
- Aguerret
- Aistor
- Alkkatia
- Ahargo
- Ainus
- Alhorchar
- Arambeaux
- Aramburu
- Aranéder
- Arangaray
- Arhanchet
- Arthaxet
- Artheguiet
- Artzanüthürry
- Askain
- Askonobiet
- Askoz
- Askozborda
- Athaket
- Athakéta
- Ayscar
- Bagardikoborda
- Baralegne (pass)
- Barbieborda
- Barbieko Eyhéra
- Barcardats
- Barcochbide
- Barnetche
- Barrenkia
- Belloya
- Beltchun
- Beltzantzuburu
- Berhaburu
- Berho
- Bermaillou
- Betan
- Beteria
- Bidau
- Bigne (pass)
- Biscay
- Bohogu
- Bordabegoïty
- Bordaburia
- Bordacharia
- Bordagay
- Bordagoyhen
- Bordetta
- Burgia
- Cabana
- Cachau
- Chiloua
- Choko
- Chourikoborro
- Cocutchia
- Cotabaren
- Cotiart
- Coyos
- Coyosborda
- La Croix Blanche
- Curutchiga
- Doronda
- Duque
- Eihartzéta
- Elhar
- Elhurdoy
- Eperrape
- Eperregagne
- Erguillota
- Errande
- Errékartéa
- Espel
- Espelia
- Estecondo
- Etchahoun
- Etchanchu
- Etchandy
- Etchartéa
- Etchebarne
- Etcheberriborda
- Etcheberry (2 places)
- Etchecopaberria
- Etchegoren
- Eyharche
- Eyhartzet
- Eyhea
- Eyheregaray (2 places)
- Eyhéramendy
- Fabiania
- Gagnéko Borda
- Galharetborda
- Garay
- Garrat
- Gastellondo
- Gorostordoy
- Gorrostibar
- Goyheneix
- Goyheski
- Goyhetsia
- Goytolia
- Guibelhéguiet
- Haritchast
- Haritchelhar
- Harritchilondo
- Haubiga
- Hégoburu
- Héguiapal
- Heguilla
- Héguitchoussy
- Ibar
- Ibarrondo
- Idiart
- Ihitzaga
- Ilharra
- Itchal
- Jacobia
- Jaureguiberry
- Lagune
- Lapitz
- Lapitzia
- Larragorry
- Larranda
- Larrandabuia
- Larrasquet
- Larrorry
- Laxague
- Laxagueborda
- Lecheguita (pass, 653 m)
- Legegaray
- Lépazka
- Lescarpé
- Logeborde
- Lohidoy
- Lohidoyborda
- Lojaborda
- Malobra
- Maysonnave
- Menusketa
- Mercaptpide
- Mercaptpide Borda
- Mignaborda
- Miranda
- Mocho
- Montokoaltéa
- Muskogorry
- Nissibart
- Oholéguy
- Oilher
- Ondarzuhia
- Ordanoulet
- Ostallaborda
- Oyhanart
- Paradis
- Pelento
- Pellen
- Perkain
- Petchia
- Petillon
- Picochet
- Pinka
- Pordoy
- Potho
- Princi
- Princiborda
- Puchulu
- Restoy
- Sagardoyhégui
- Salaber
- Salazar
- Salazarborda
- Salhanka
- Sapiula
- Sardo
- Saruborda
- Seceneguiet
- Sinto
- Sorhotus
- Suhatsola
- Thias
- Topet
- Udoy
- Uhalt
- Uhaltborda
- Uhart
- Urrustoy
- Urruty
- Uthuère
- Uthurralt
- Uthurry
- Zatzoury

== Toponymy ==
The commune name in Basque is Barkoxe.

Jean-Baptiste Orpustan proposes a Basque etymological construction in two parts. The first element barr meaning "located inside, at the bottom" is joined to the element -koiz to approximate the Basque goiz meaning "morning or east". Barcus is located in a low valley to the east which justifies the Orpustan analysis.

The following table details the origins of the commune name and other names in the commune.

| Name | Spelling | Date | Source | Page | Origin | Description |
|---|---|---|---|---|---|---|
| Barcus | Barcuys | 1384 | Raymond | 21 | Navarrenx | Village |
| | Barcuix | 1462 | Raymond | 21 | Oloron | |
| | Sent-Saubador de Barcuix | 1470 | Raymond | 21 | Ohix | |
| | Barcoys | 1520 | Raymond | 21 | Customs | |
| | Barcois | 1520 | Orpustan | 204 | | |
| | Barcux | 1580 | Raymond | 21 | Luxe | |
| | Barcinx | 1650 | Raymond | 21 | Guienne | |
| | Barcuix | 1690 | Orpustan | 204 | | |
| | Bareus | 1801 | Bulletin des lois | | | |
| Agaras | Agarassi | 1479 | Raymond | 3 | Ohix | Farm |
| Bilapu | Bilapu | 1520 | Raymond | 31 | Customs | Farm |
| Biscay | Biscaya | 1479 | Raymond | 32 | Ohix | Farm |
| Charritet | Charritet | 1520 | Raymond | 48 | Customs | Farm |
| Gastellondo | Gastézoszo | 1863 | Raymond | 68 | | Hamlet |
| Guibelhéguiet | Guibelleguiet | 1479 | Raymond | 73 | Ohix | Hamlet |
| | Guibéléguiet-Ibarra | 1863 | Raymond | 73 | | |
| Hégoburu | Hégoaburu | 1479 | Raymond | 77 | Ohix | Farm |
| | Hégobure | 1863 | Raymond | 77 | | |
| Iriard | Iriard | 1520 | Raymond | 83 | Customs | Farm |
| Jaureguiberry | Jauréguiberry-Harra | 1863 | Raymond | 85 | | Hamlet |
| Larréja | Larréja | 1863 | Raymond | 94 | | Hamlet |
| Le Paradis | Le Paradis | 1863 | Raymond | 131 | | Chapel and Stream |
| Udoy | Udoy | 1479 | Raymond | 170 | Ohix | Farm |
| Uhart | Uhart | 1520 | Raymond | 170 | Customs | Farm |

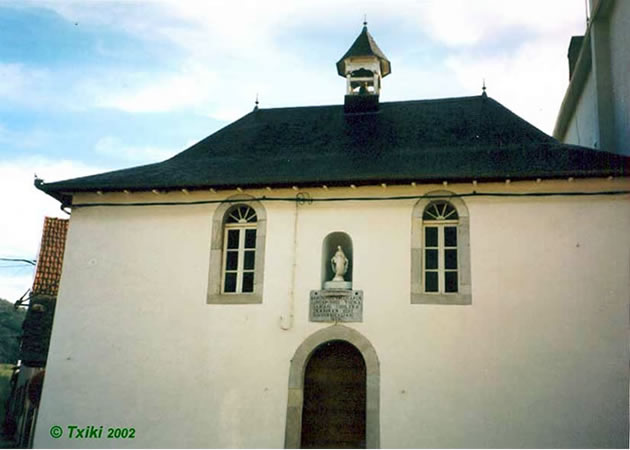
A Chapel in Barcus

Sources:

- Raymond: Topographic Dictionary of the Department of Basses-Pyrenees, 1863, on the page numbers indicated in the table. (in French)
- Orpustan: Jean-Baptiste Orpustan, New Basque Toponymy
- Bulletin des Lois: Des villages de Cassini aux communes d'aujourd'hui: Commune data sheet Barcus, EHESS (in French).

Origins:

- Navarrenx: Notaries of Navarrenx
- Oloron: Notaries of Oloron-Sainte-Marie
- 'Ohix: Contracts retained by Ohix, Notary of Soule
- Customs: Customs of Soule
- Luxe: Titles of Luxe
- Guienne: Government General of Guienne and Guascogne and neighbouring country

== History ==
Jean-Baptiste Orpustan noted that the commune was a former "royal town".

Paul Raymond on page 21 of his 1863 dictionary noted that the commune had a Lay Abbey, vassal of the Viscounts of Soule. In 1790 Barcus was the capital of a Canton dependent on the District of Mauleon Licharre and made up of the communes of Barcus, L'Hôpital-Saint-Blaise, and Roquiague.

Barcus appears as Barcux on the 1750 Cassini Map and the same on the 1790 version.

== Administration ==
List of Successive Mayors

| From | To | Name |
|---|---|---|
| 1935 | 1954 | Ambroise Bethular |
| 1954 | 1989 | Jean-Baptiste Jaureguiberry |
| 1989 | 1995 | François Uthurry |
| 1995 | 2001 | Jean Barneix |
| 2001 | 2026 | Jean-Marc Baranthol |

=== Inter-communality ===
The commune is part of five inter-communal structures:

- the Communauté d'agglomération du Pays Basque;
- the AEP association of Pays de Soule;
- the sanitation association of Pays de Soule;
- the Energy association of Pyrénées-Atlantiques;
- the inter-communal association to support Basque culture.

== Demography ==
The Journal by Pierre Casalivetery, Notary at Mauléon, during 1460-1481 counted 26 fires at Barcus and 210 for the years 1540–1548, indicating a rapidly growing population.

The inhabitants of the commune are known in French as Barcusiens or Barcusiennes and in Basque as Barkoxtar.

Historical population

| Year | Pop. | ±% p.a. |
|---|---|---|
| 1793 | 2,299 | — |
| 1800 | 2,229 | −0.44% |
| 1806 | 2,370 | +1.03% |
| 1821 | 1,921 | −1.39% |
| 1831 | 2,497 | +2.66% |
| 1836 | 2,472 | −0.20% |
| 1841 | 2,372 | −0.82% |
| 1846 | 2,303 | −0.59% |
| 1851 | 2,341 | +0.33% |
| 1856 | 2,119 | −1.97% |
| 1861 | 2,091 | −0.27% |
| 1866 | 2,007 | −0.82% |
| 1872 | 1,807 | −1.73% |
| 1876 | 1,740 | −0.94% |
| 1881 | 1,781 | +0.47% |
| 1886 | 1,740 | −0.46% |
| 1891 | 1,692 | −0.56% |
| 1896 | 1,614 | −0.94% |
| 1901 | 1,591 | −0.29% |

| Year | Pop. | ±% p.a. |
|---|---|---|
| 1906 | 1,549 | −0.53% |
| 1911 | 1,602 | +0.68% |
| 1921 | 1,350 | −1.70% |
| 1926 | 1,365 | +0.22% |
| 1931 | 1,322 | −0.64% |
| 1936 | 1,340 | +0.27% |
| 1946 | 1,200 | −1.10% |
| 1954 | 1,113 | −0.94% |
| 1962 | 1,101 | −0.14% |
| 1968 | 990 | −1.76% |
| 1975 | 957 | −0.48% |
| 1982 | 916 | −0.62% |
| 1990 | 788 | −1.86% |
| 1999 | 774 | −0.20% |
| 2007 | 736 | −0.63% |
| 2012 | 693 | −1.20% |
| 2017 | 642 | −1.52% |
| 2023 | 654 | +0.31% |

Source: EHESS and INSEE

== Economy ==
Economic activity is mainly oriented towards agriculture (mixed farming and sheep farming). The commune is part of the Appellation d'origine contrôlée (AOC) zone designation of Ossau-iraty.

== Culture and heritage ==
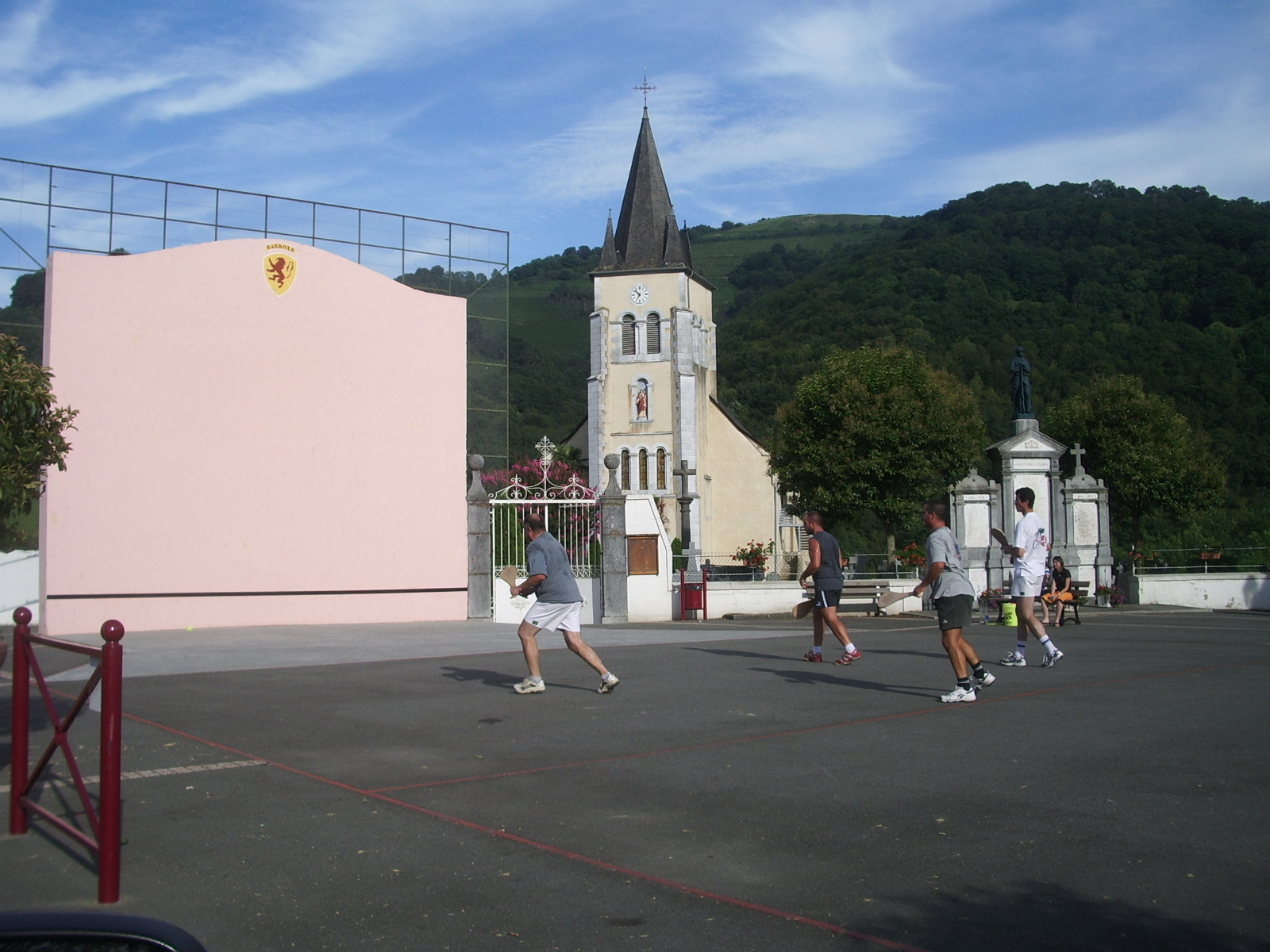
The Church and the Fronton

=== Civil heritage ===
- The Lamiñen ziloa ("Cave of laminak" in Basque). Laminak are small lutins in Basque mythology.
- A treasure trove of Celtiberian currency (400-100 BC.) was discovered in 1879. Composed of 1,750 silver coins from different cities of Navarre and Aragon, the reason for their presence in Barcus remains controversial.
- A gaztelu zahar (Note: A prehistoric fortified place) stands at 440 metres above sea level in the Haitzhandia locality.

=== Religious heritage ===
- The Parish Church of the Ascension (Middle Ages) is registered as an historical monument. It was largely rebuilt in the 19th century and restored in the 20th century. It contains a Bronze Bell (1689) that is registered as an historical object.

=== Cultural events ===
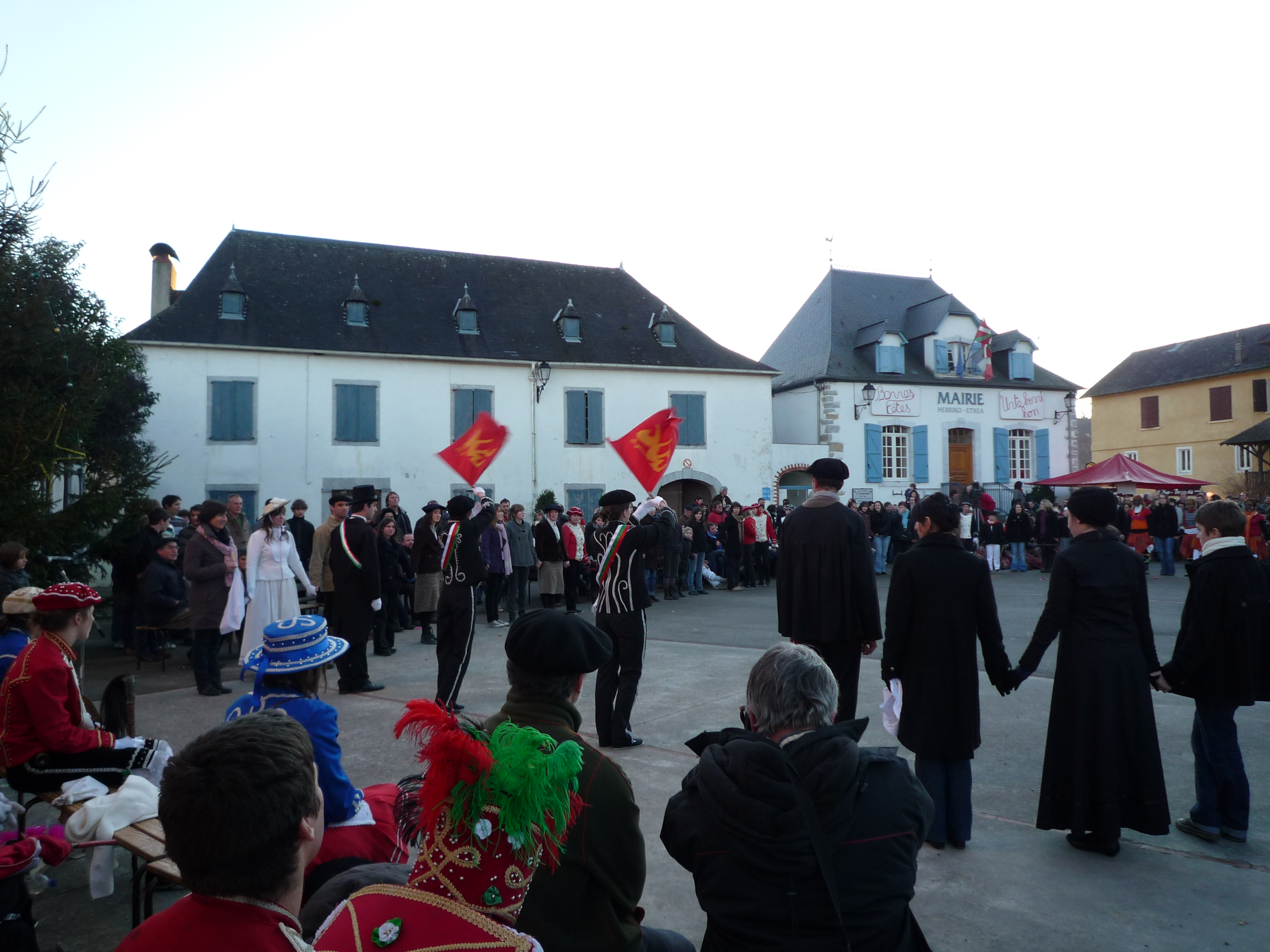
The 2009 Pastoral in Barcus

In 2009 Barcus organised a Pastoral, a Soule traditional show mixing theatre, dancing and singing. There is a Pastoral throughout winter until April on Sundays in other villages of Soule.

== Notable people linked to the commune ==
- Léon Urthuburu, vice-consul for France in Guayaquil, Ecuador, originally from Barcus, he bequeathed Floreana Island in the Galápagos Islands to the commune in 1860. Despite his efforts Barcus never took possession.
- Pierre Topet, alias "Etxahun", born in Barcus (1786-1862), a Basque poet.
- Jean Touan, born in 1817 at Barcus, was the founder of the Café Tortoni in Buenos Aires. The café was bequeathed to Célestin Curutchet in 1872, another native of Barcus.
- André Chilo, French rugby player, born on 5 July 1898 at Bordeaux and died on 3 November 1982 at Barcus.

== See also ==
- Communes of the Pyrénées-Atlantiques department
