= Féas =

Commune in Pyrénées-Atlantiques, France

- Part of Ance Féas
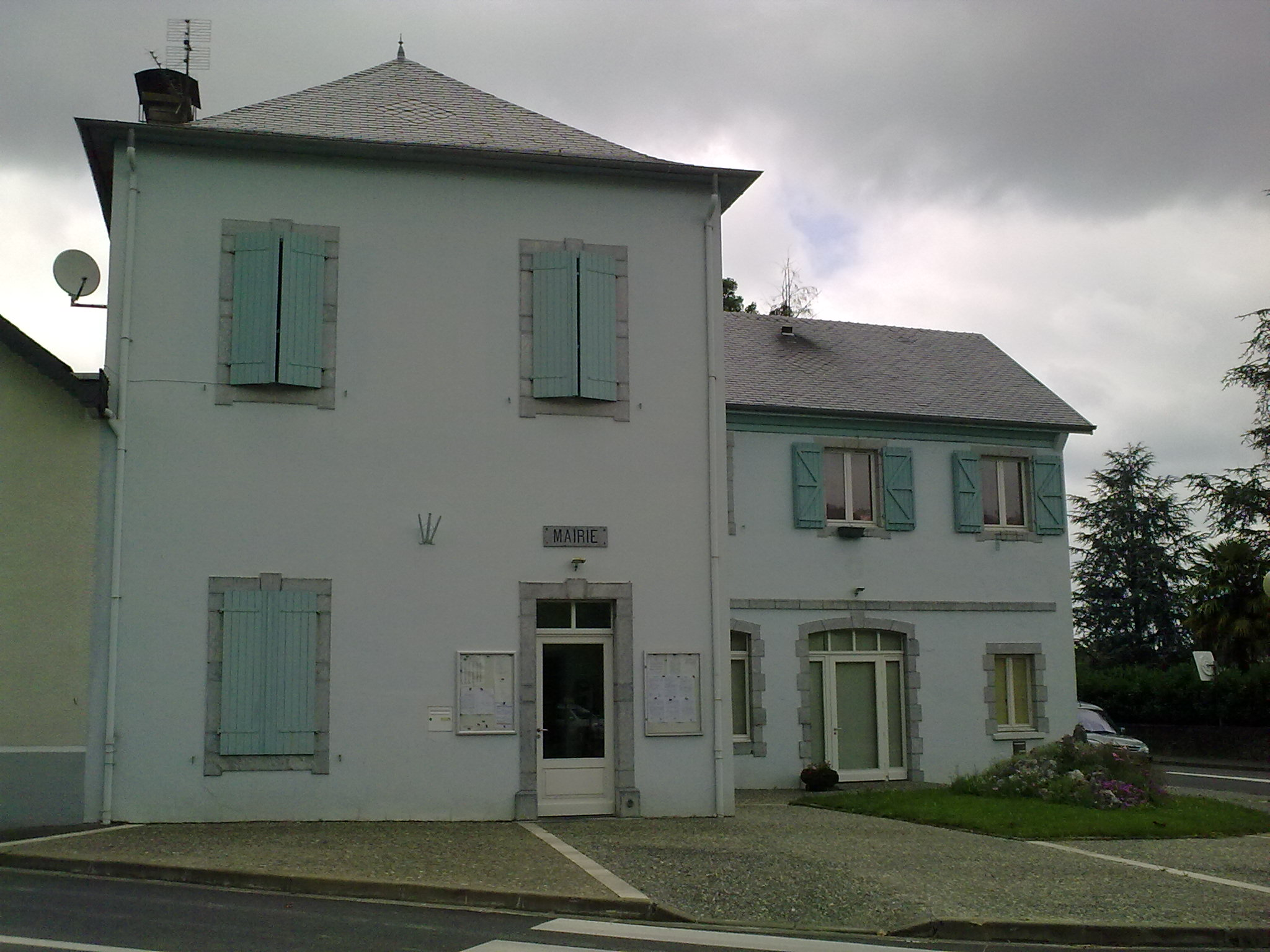
- Town Hall
- Location of Féas
- Location within France Location within Nouvelle-Aquitaine
- Coordinates: 43°09′26″N 0°41′16″W
- Country: France
- Region: Nouvelle-Aquitaine
- Department: Pyrénées-Atlantiques
- Arrondissement: Oloron-Sainte-Marie
- Canton: Oloron-Sainte-Marie-1
- Commune: Ance Féas
- Area^{1}: 13.71 km^{2} (5.29 sq mi)
- Highest elevation: 475 m (1,558 ft)
- Lowest elevation: 211 m (692 ft)
- Population (2022): 389
  - Density: 28.4/km^{2} (73.5/sq mi)
- Time zone: UTC+01:00 (CET)
  - Summer (DST): UTC+02:00 (CEST)
- Postal code: 64570
- ^{1} French Land Register data, which excludes lakes, ponds, glaciers > 1 km^{2} (0.386 sq mi or 247 acres) and river estuaries.

Féas (Gascon: Hiars) is a former commune in the Pyrénées-Atlantiques department in south-western France. On 1 January 2017, it was merged into the new commune Ance Féas.

== See also ==
- Communes of the Pyrénées-Atlantiques department
