= Agnos =

- Commune
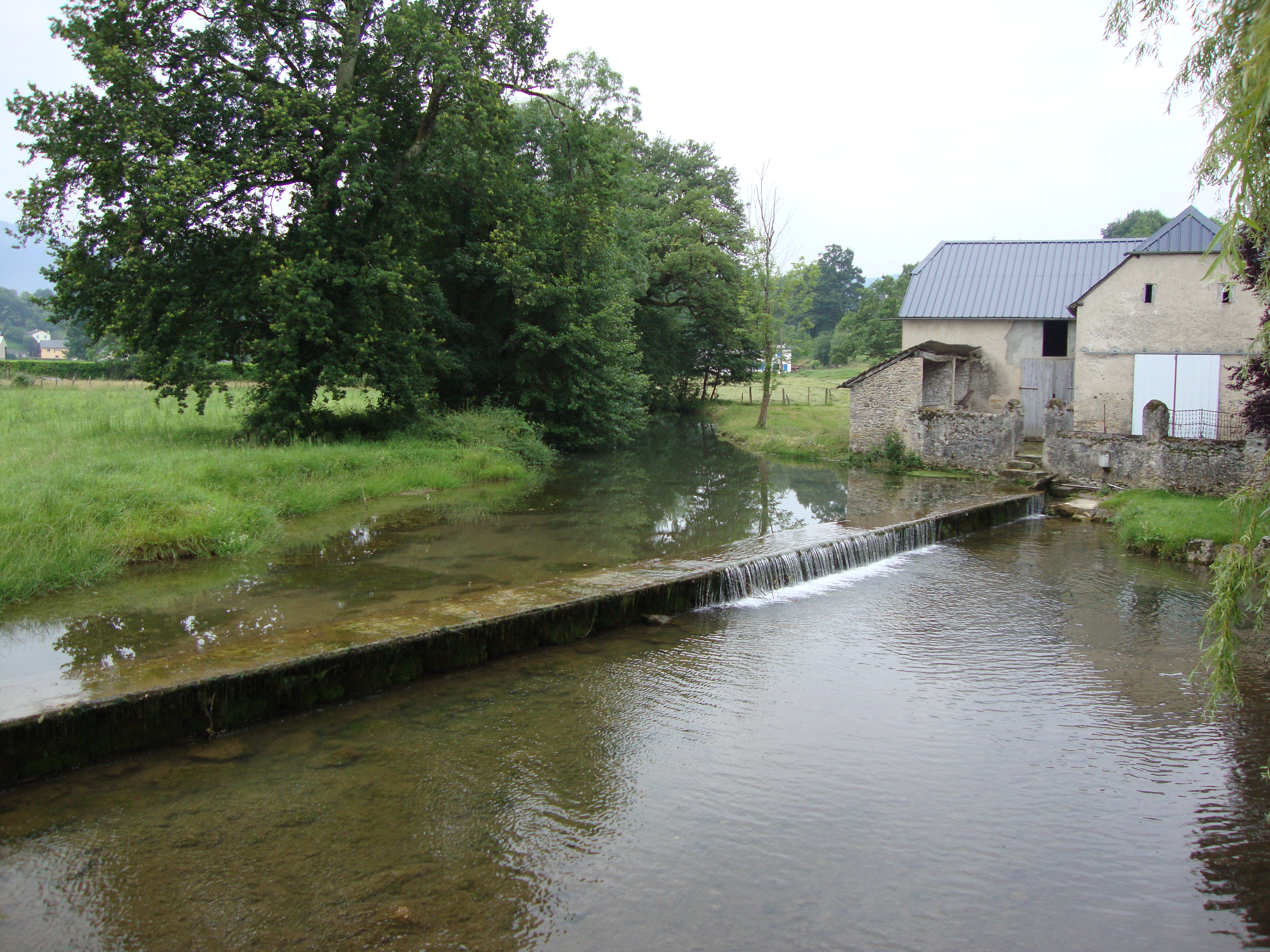
- The Mielle at Agnos
- Location of Agnos
- Location within France Location within Nouvelle-Aquitaine
- Coordinates: 43°09′50″N 0°37′05″W
- Country: France
- Region: Nouvelle-Aquitaine
- Department: Pyrénées-Atlantiques
- Arrondissement: Oloron-Sainte-Marie
- Canton: Oloron-Sainte-Marie-1
- Intercommunality: Haut Béarn

Government
  - Mayor (2020–2026): André Bernos
- Area^{1}: 9.18 km^{2} (3.54 sq mi)
- Elevation: 250 m (820 ft)
- Highest elevation: 535 m (1,755 ft)
- Lowest elevation: 247 m (810 ft)
- Population (2023): 1,044
  - Density: 114/km^{2} (295/sq mi)
- Time zone: UTC+01:00 (CET)
  - Summer (DST): UTC+02:00 (CEST)
- INSEE/Postal code: 64007 /64400
- ^{1} French Land Register data, which excludes lakes, ponds, glaciers > 1 km^{2} (0.386 sq mi or 247 acres) and river estuaries.

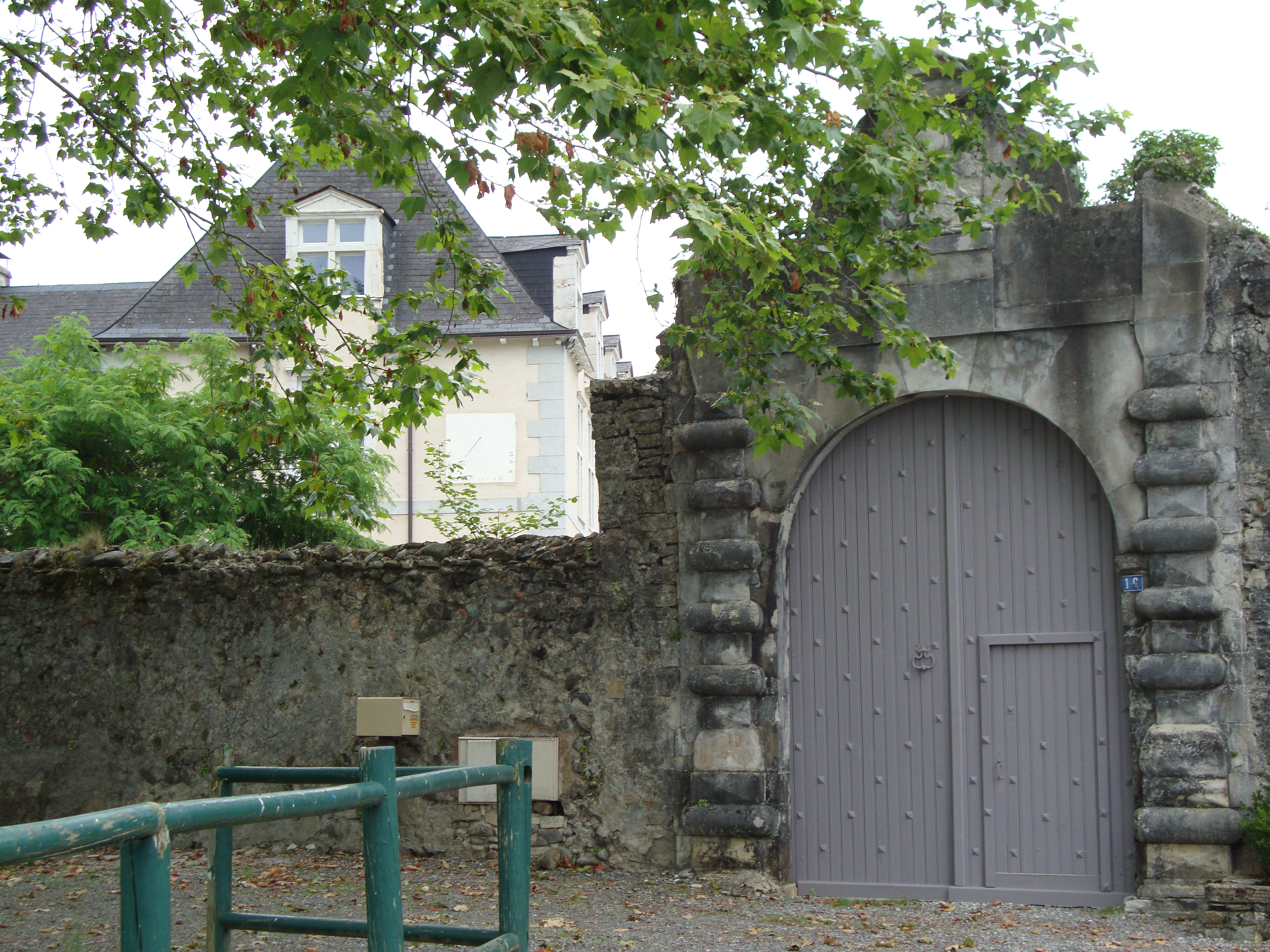
Access door to the Castle

Agnos (French pronunciation: [aɲɔs]; Occitan: Anhòs) is a commune in the Pyrénées-Atlantiques department in the Nouvelle-Aquitaine region in southwestern France. Agnos is part of the urban area (unité urbaine) of Oloron-Sainte-Marie.

The inhabitants of the commune are known as Agnosiens or Agnosiennes.

== Geography ==
Agnos is located just 2 km south of Oloron-Sainte-Marie and some 25 km southwest of Pau. It can be accessed on the D155 road from Bidos in the northeast coming southwest to the village then continuing southeast to Gurmençon. The D555 road also passes through the commune from the north and joins the D155 northeast of the village. The commune is mixed farmland and forests with the forests scattered throughout the commune.

The river Mielle, a tributary of the Gave d'Oloron (Adour basin), flows through the commune.

=== Places and hamlets ===
- La Baig
- Candalot
- Dufau
- Fontaine Anglade
- Laborde-Boy
- Lasserre
- Ledorré
- Logecoop
- Mirande
- Le Plouts
- Sayette
- Sentin

== Toponymy ==
The commune name in béarnais is Anhos. Michel Grosclaude suggested that Agnos came from a Latin man's name Annius with an Aqitaine suffix -ossum the whole meaning "domain of Annius".

The following table details the origins of the commune name and other names in the commune.

Name	Spelling	Date	Source	Page	Origin	Description
Agnos	Anhos	1364	Raymond	3	Fors de Béarn	Village
	Aynhos	14th century	Raymond	3	Census	
	Aignos	1675	Raymond	3	Reformation	
	Agnos	18th century	Grosclaude			
	Agnos	1750	Cassini			
La Baig	La Baig	1863	Raymond	3		Forest

Sources:

- Raymond: Topographic Dictionary of the Department of Basses-Pyrenees, 1863, on the page numbers indicated in the table. (in French)
- Grosclaude: Toponymic Dictionary of communes, Béarn, 2006 (in French)
- Cassini: Cassini Map from 1750

Origins:

- Fors de Béarn
- Census: Census of Béarn
- Reformation: Reformation of Béarn

== History ==
Paul Raymond noted on page 3 of his 1863 dictionary that in 1385 Agnos had seventeen fires and depended on the bailiwick of Oloron.

The commune was merged with Gurmençon on 1 February 1973 to form the commune called Val-du-Gave d'Aspe. It was restored to its previous status on 1 January 1983.

== Administration ==
List of Successive Mayors of Agnos

From	To	Name	Party
1995	2026	André Bernos	PS

=== Inter-communality ===
The town is part of five inter-communal organisations:

- the Community of communes of Haut Béarn
- the SIVU to limit floods in Agnos
- the AEP Union for Agnos-Gurmençon
- the Inter-communal Union for Sanitisation for the Aspe gateway
- the energy union for Pyrénées-Atlantiques

== Population ==
Historical population

Year	Pop.	±% p.a.
1793	346	—
1800	301	−1.97%
1806	328	+1.44%
1821	375	+0.90%
1831	421	+1.16%
1836	479	+2.61%
1841	473	−0.25%
1846	482	+0.38%
1851	461	−0.89%
1856	431	−1.34%
1861	431	+0.00%
1866	419	−0.56%
1872	407	−0.48%
1876	372	−2.22%
1881	402	+1.56%
1886	384	−0.91%
1891	405	+1.07%
1896	405	+0.00%
1901	412	+0.34%

Year	Pop.	±% p.a.
1906	406	−0.29%
1911	403	−0.15%
1921	401	−0.05%
1926	374	−1.38%
1931	373	−0.05%
1936	368	−0.27%
1946	351	−0.47%
1954	390	+1.33%
1962	372	−0.59%
1968	353	−0.87%
1975	465	+4.02%
1982	478	+0.39%
1990	645	+3.82%
1999	751	+1.70%
2007	834	+1.32%
2012	910	+1.76%
2017	1,019	+2.29%
2023	1,044	+0.40%

Source: EHESS and INSEE

== Economy ==
The activity of the commune is mainly agricultural (farming, polyculture). The town is part of the Appellation d'origine contrôlée (AOC) of ossau-iraty.

== Culture and heritage ==
=== Religious Heritage ===
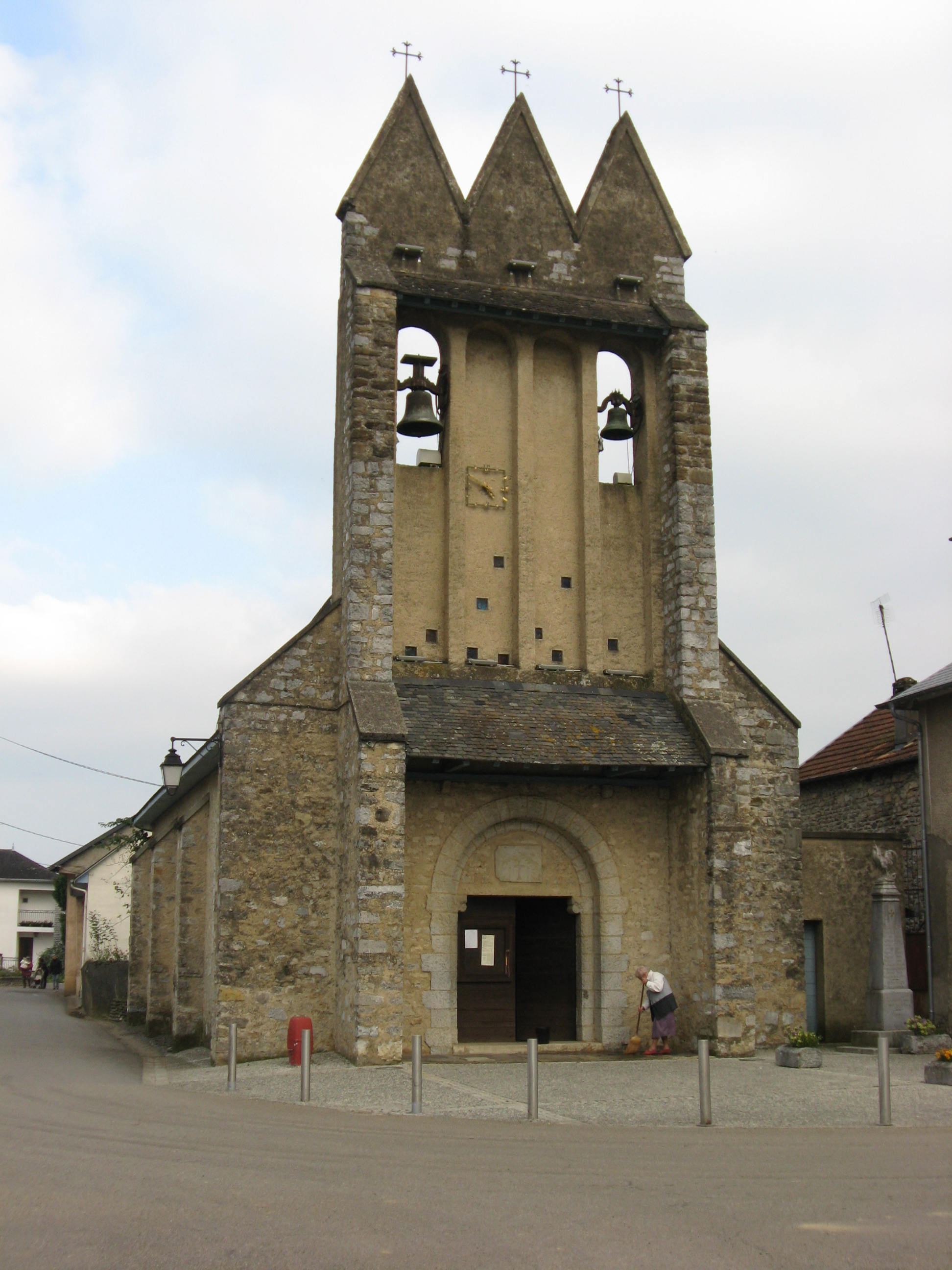
Church from the 19th century

The Church has a Trinitarian steeple (the presence of a Bell-gable or campenard). It contains many items which are registered as historical objects (although some were destroyed by fire in 1968):

- An Altar (destroyed) (18th century)
- 6 Candlesticks (destroyed) (18th century)
- A Cross (destroyed) (18th century)
- A Tabernacle (destroyed) (18th century)
- A Chalice (18th century)
- A Ciborium (18th century)
- A Retable (destroyed) (18th century)

=== Environmental heritage ===
The Forests of Bugangue and Labaigt are inter-association woods managed by the National Office of Forests (ONF) which provide valuable shelter for preserving local flora and fauna. Many species are protected. An arboretum is a result of collaboration with the ONF.

The Mielle, a small stream that rises in Agnos, is listed in the Natura 2000 program for three rare species: white-clawed crayfish, European pond turtles, and the rare European mink which does not exist anywhere in France except in the south-west.

The Pyrenees are rich in scenery and the village of Agnos is the starting point of a route for cycling across the foothills: From Agnos to Mail Arrouil and back (four hours of cycling or seven hours of walking) in a variety of environments, moors, rocks, meadows with views of the Pyrenees. This route, like many others, is managed by the local hiking plan of the Community of communes of Piémont Oloronais (CCPO).

== Facilities ==
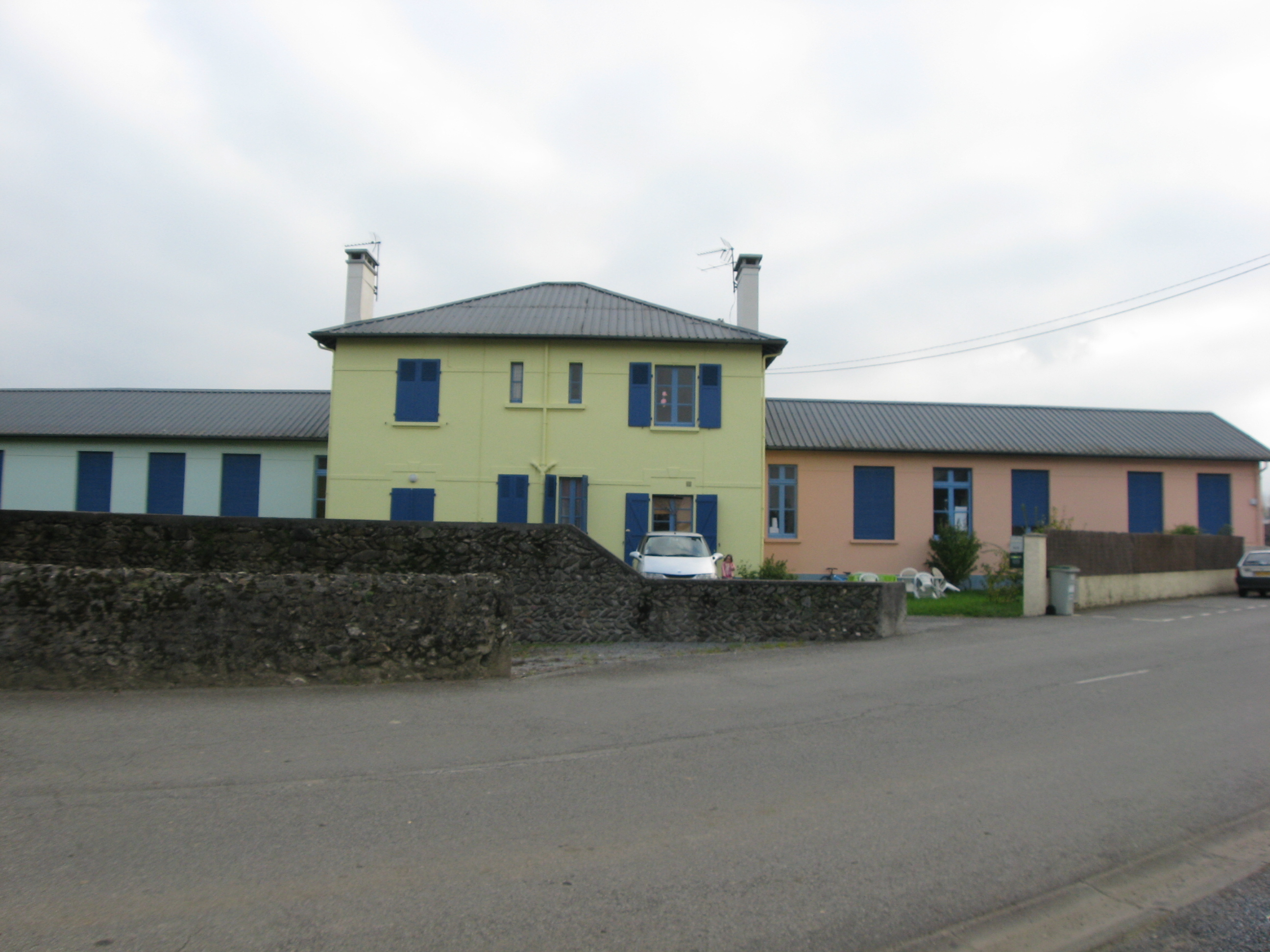
Primary school

Associations

The model aircraft club welcomes its members in the Sayette neighborhood.

Education

The town has a primary school.

Multi-Media Library

The Multi-media library project of the CCPO identified the municipal library of Agnos as a relay point.

Sports and sports equipment

The basketball club merged with that of Asasp in 2006 to form BCHB (Basketball Club of Haut-Bearn).

== Notable People linked to the commune ==
- Catherine Capdevielle, born in 1938 in Agnos, is an athlete specialising in ordeal sprinting.

== See also ==
- Communes of the Pyrénées-Atlantiques department
