= Bido =

Bido may refer to:

- Bido (Dragon Ball Z), a character in the anime film Dragon Ball Z: Bojack Unbound
- Bido (Fullmetal Alchemist), a character in the manga series Fullmetal Alchemist

== People with the surname ==
- Antonio Bido (born 1949), Italian film director
- Cándido Bidó (1936–2011), Dominican Republic artist
- Osvaldo Bido (born 1995), Dominican baseball player

== See also ==
- Bidos, a commune of Pyrénées-Atlantiques, France
