= Ance, Pyrénées-Atlantiques =

Ance
- Part of Ance Féas
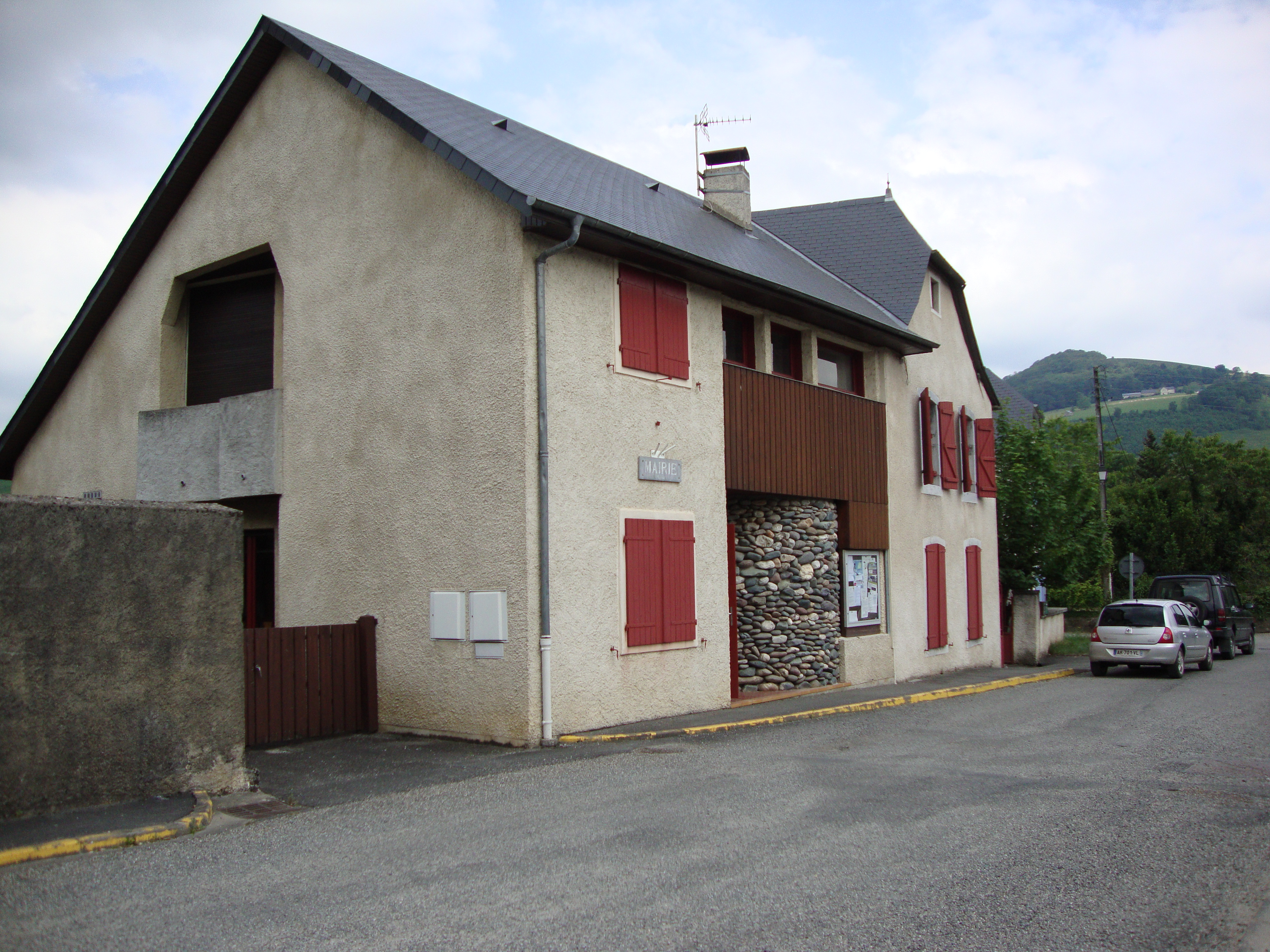
- Town hall
- Location of Ance
- Location within France Location within Nouvelle-Aquitaine
- Coordinates: 43°08′47″N 0°41′25″W
- Country: France
- Region: Nouvelle-Aquitaine
- Department: Pyrénées-Atlantiques
- Arrondissement: Oloron-Sainte-Marie
- Canton: Oloron-Sainte-Marie-1
- Commune: Ance Féas
- Area^{1}: 10.12 km^{2} (3.91 sq mi)
- Elevation: 252 m (827 ft)
- Highest elevation: 581 m (1,906 ft)
- Lowest elevation: 244 m (801 ft)
- Population (2022): 230
  - Density: 23/km^{2} (59/sq mi)
- Time zone: UTC+01:00 (CET)
  - Summer (DST): UTC+02:00 (CEST)
- Postal code: 64570
- ^{1} French Land Register data, which excludes lakes, ponds, glaciers > 1 km^{2} (0.386 sq mi or 247 acres) and river estuaries.

Ance (French pronunciation: [ɑ̃s]; Gascon: Ansa) is a former commune in the Pyrénées-Atlantiques department in Nouvelle-Aquitaine in southwestern France. On 1 January 2017, it was merged into the new commune Ance Féas.

== See also ==
- Communes of the Pyrénées-Atlantiques department
