= Ance Féas =

- Commune
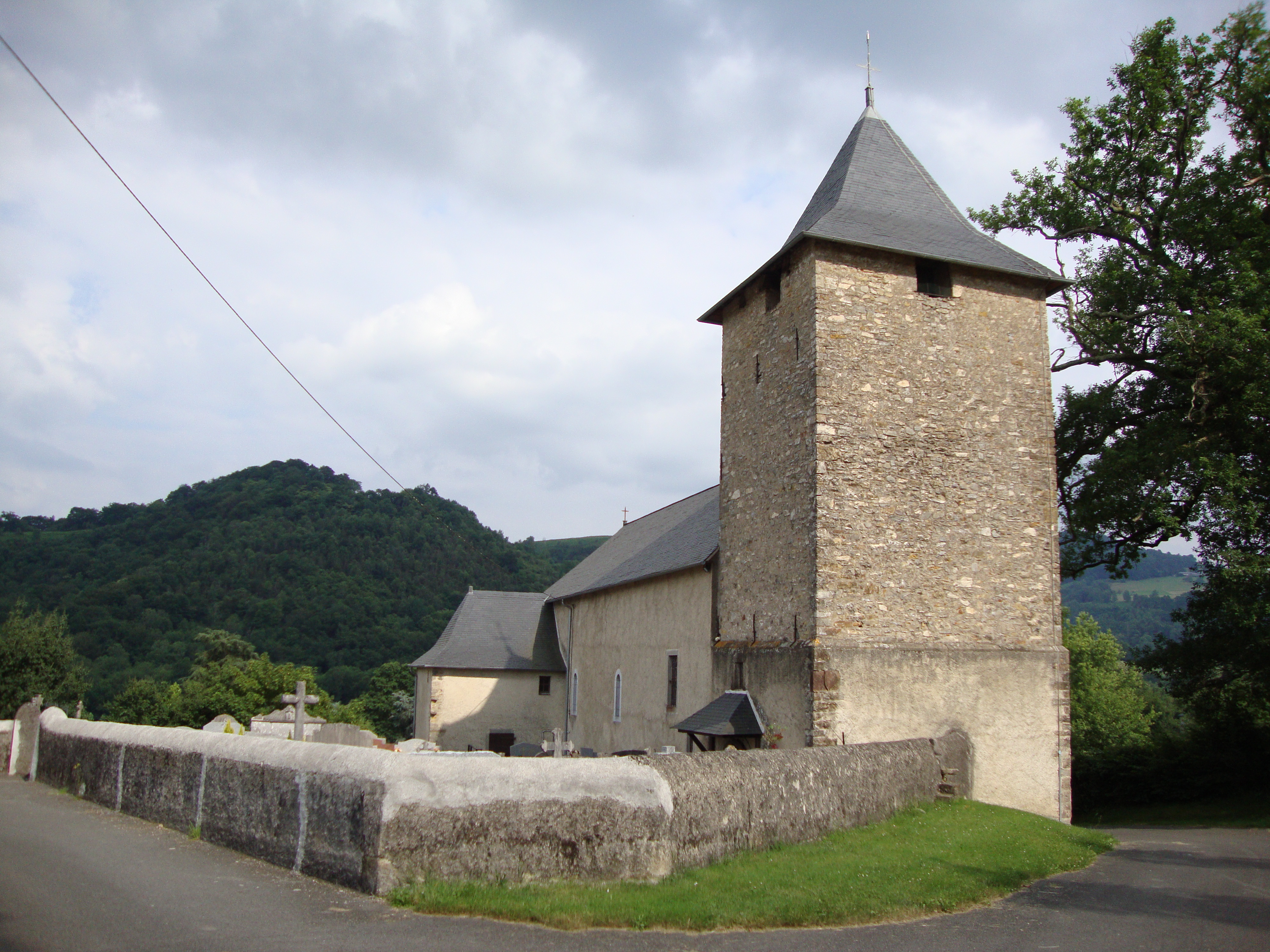
- The church of Saint-Barthélemy, in Féas
- Location of Ance Féas
- Location within France Location within Nouvelle-Aquitaine
- Coordinates: 43°09′25″N 0°41′17″W
- Country: France
- Region: Nouvelle-Aquitaine
- Department: Pyrénées-Atlantiques
- Arrondissement: Oloron-Sainte-Marie
- Canton: Oloron-Sainte-Marie-1
- Intercommunality: Haut Béarn

Government
  - Mayor (2020–2026): Jean-Claude Coste
- Area^{1}: 23.83 km^{2} (9.20 sq mi)
- Population (2023): 624
  - Density: 26.2/km^{2} (67.8/sq mi)
- Time zone: UTC+01:00 (CET)
  - Summer (DST): UTC+02:00 (CEST)
- INSEE/Postal code: 64225 /64570
- ^{1} French Land Register data, which excludes lakes, ponds, glaciers > 1 km^{2} (0.386 sq mi or 247 acres) and river estuaries.

Ance Féas (French pronunciation: [ɑ̃s feas]; Occitan: Ansa e Hiars) is a commune in the department of Pyrénées-Atlantiques, southwestern France. The municipality was established on 1 January 2017 by merger of the former communes of Féas (the seat) and Ance.

== See also ==
- Communes of the Pyrénées-Atlantiques department
