= Borce =

- Commune
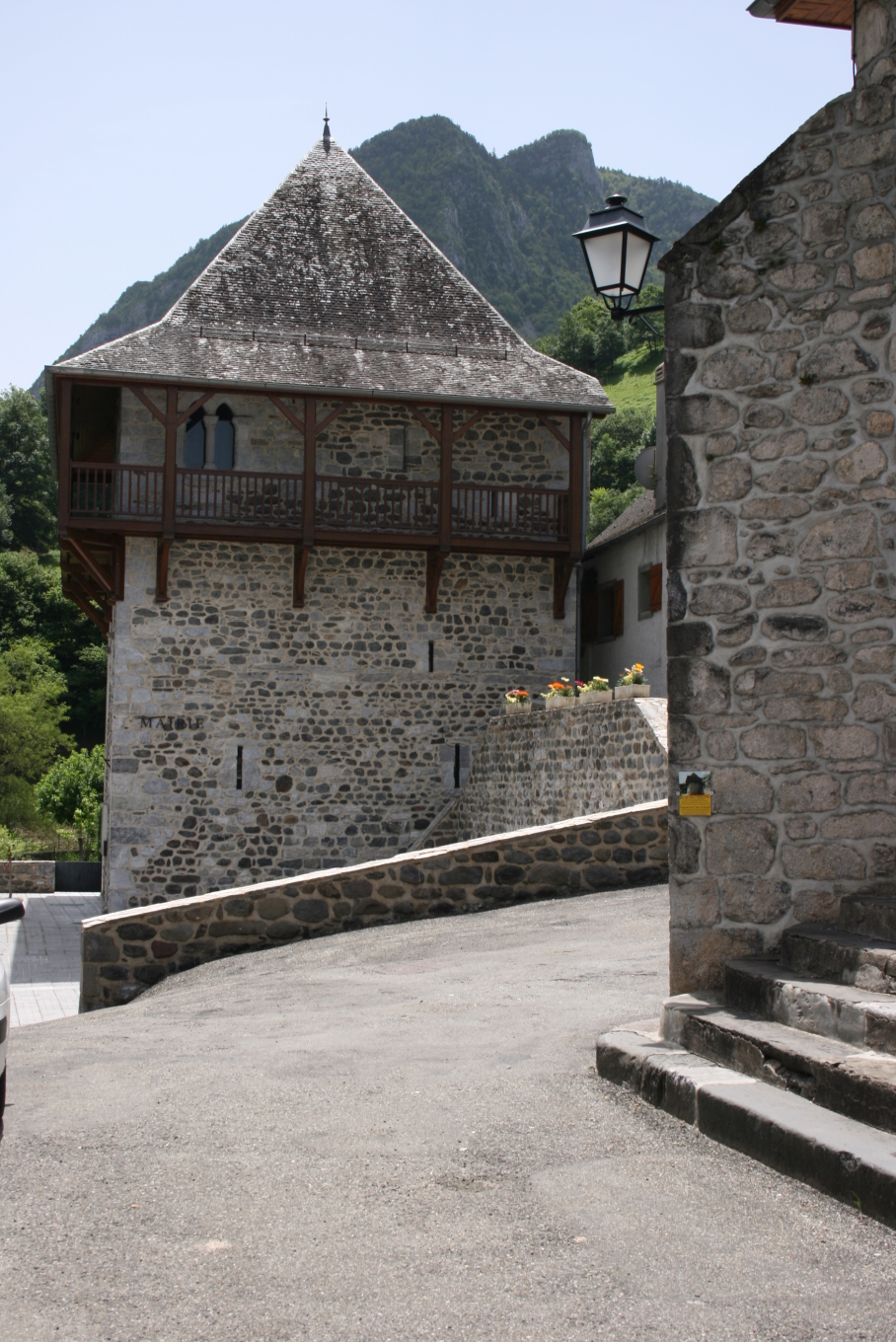
- Town hall
- Location of Borce
- Location within France Location within Nouvelle-Aquitaine
- Coordinates: 42°54′37″N 0°34′18″W
- Country: France
- Region: Nouvelle-Aquitaine
- Department: Pyrénées-Atlantiques
- Arrondissement: Oloron-Sainte-Marie
- Canton: Oloron-Sainte-Marie-1
- Intercommunality: Haut Béarn

Government
  - Mayor (2022–2026): Philippe Vigneau
- Area^{1}: 58.05 km^{2} (22.41 sq mi)
- Highest elevation: 2,258 m (7,408 ft)
- Lowest elevation: 560 m (1,840 ft)
- Population (2023): 112
  - Density: 1.93/km^{2} (5.00/sq mi)
- Time zone: UTC+01:00 (CET)
  - Summer (DST): UTC+02:00 (CEST)
- INSEE/Postal code: 64136 /64490
- ^{1} French Land Register data, which excludes lakes, ponds, glaciers > 1 km^{2} (0.386 sq mi or 247 acres) and river estuaries.

Borce (French pronunciation: [bɔʁs]; Occitan: Bòrça) is a commune in the Pyrénées-Atlantiques department in southwestern France.

== See also ==
- Communes of the Pyrénées-Atlantiques department
