= Moumour =

- Commune
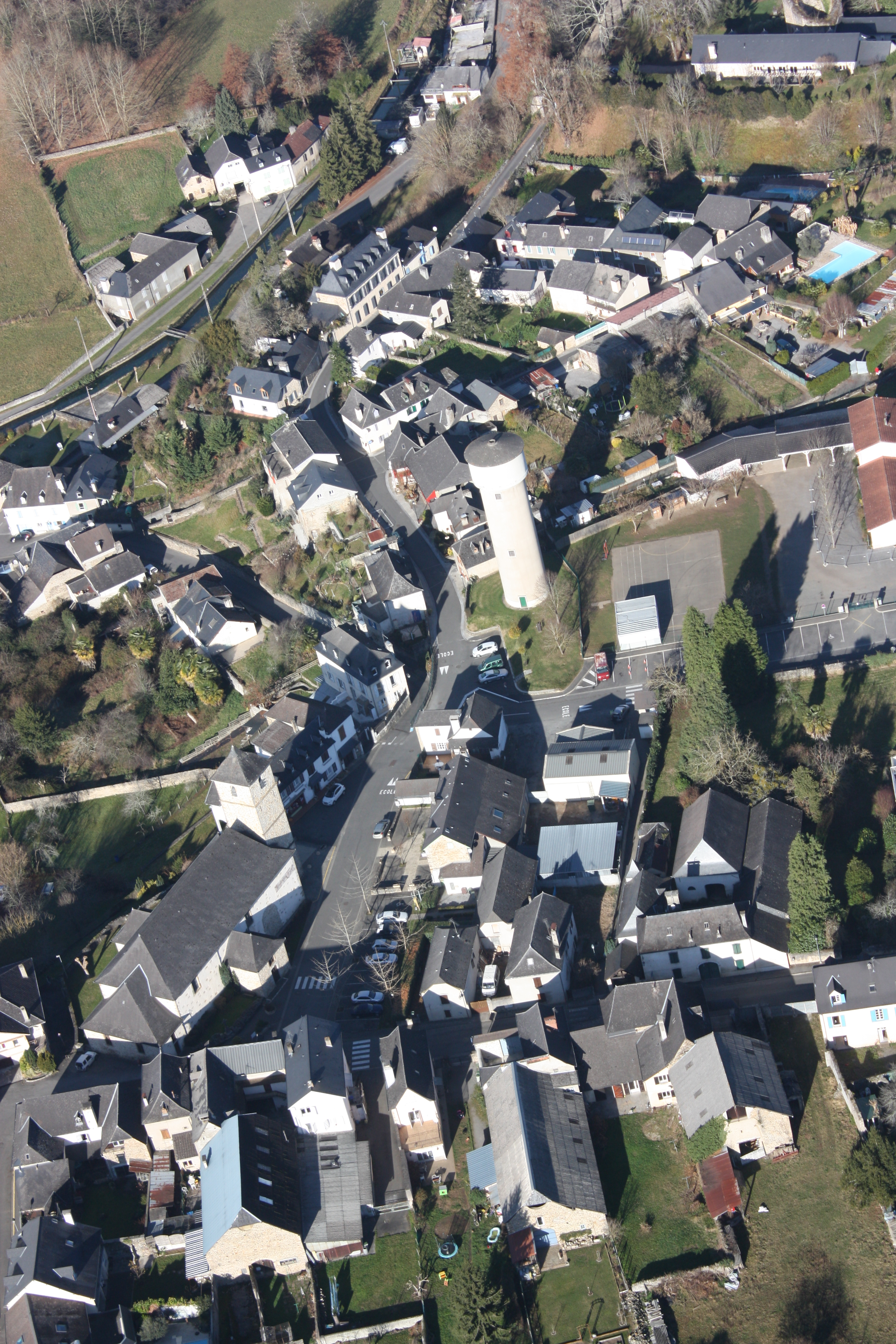
- An aerial view of the village
- Location of Moumour
- Location within France Location within Nouvelle-Aquitaine
- Coordinates: 43°12′51″N 0°39′15″W
- Country: France
- Region: Nouvelle-Aquitaine
- Department: Pyrénées-Atlantiques
- Arrondissement: Oloron-Sainte-Marie
- Canton: Oloron-Sainte-Marie-1
- Intercommunality: Haut Béarn

Government
  - Mayor (2020–2026): Jean-Luc Estournès
- Area^{1}: 8.05 km^{2} (3.11 sq mi)
- Elevation: 221 m (725 ft)
- Highest elevation: 324 m (1,063 ft)
- Lowest elevation: 177 m (581 ft)
- Population (2023): 814
  - Density: 101/km^{2} (262/sq mi)
- Time zone: UTC+01:00 (CET)
  - Summer (DST): UTC+02:00 (CEST)
- INSEE/Postal code: 64409 /64400
- ^{1} French Land Register data, which excludes lakes, ponds, glaciers > 1 km^{2} (0.386 sq mi or 247 acres) and river estuaries.

Moumour (Occitan: Momor; Basque: Mumur) is a commune in the Pyrénées-Atlantiques department in south-western France. The French opera singer Marc Bonnehée was born there in 1828.

== See also ==
- Communes of the Pyrénées-Atlantiques department
