= Geüs-d'Oloron =

- Commune
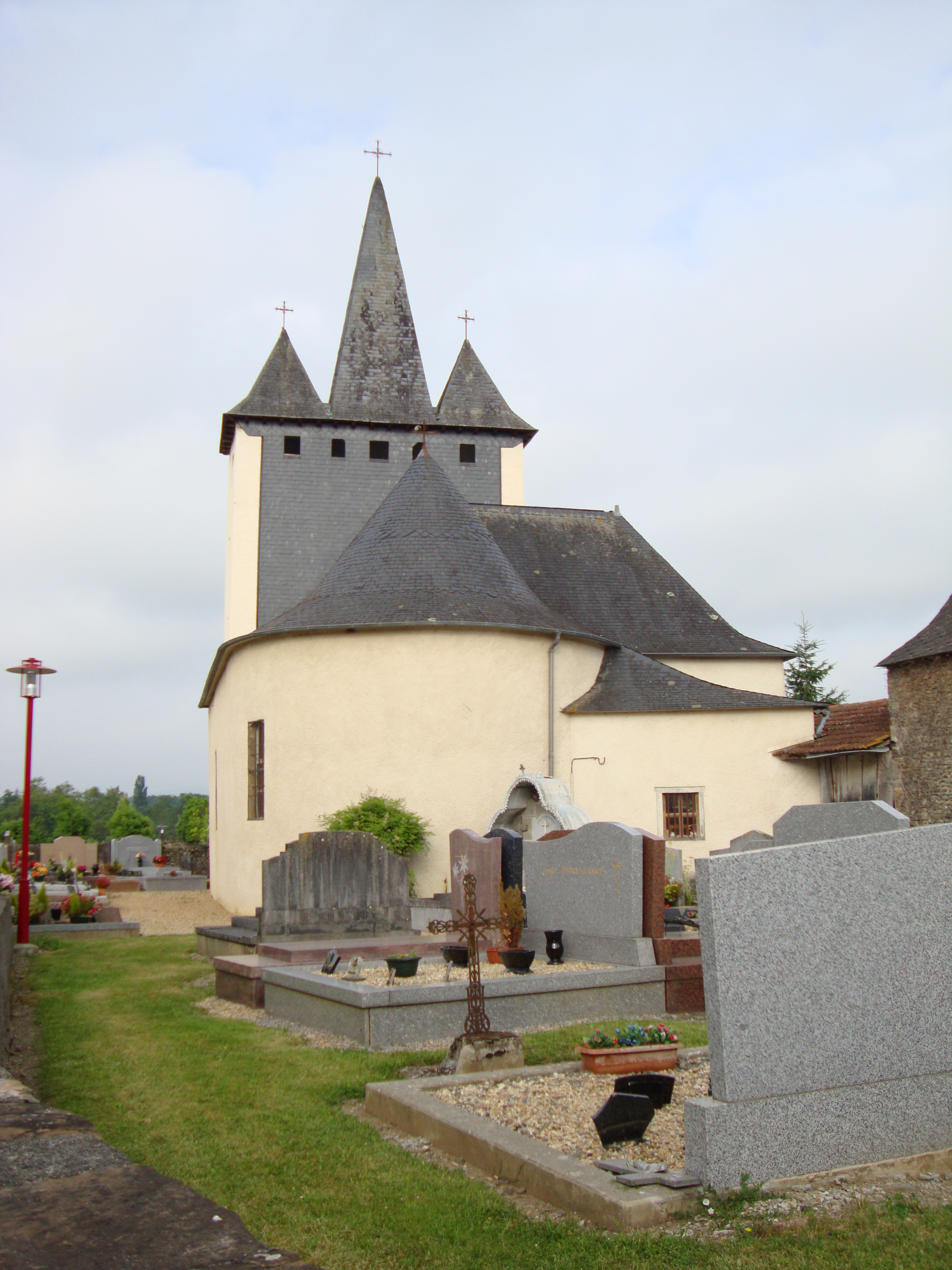
- The church of Geüs-d'Oloron
- Location of Geüs-d'Oloron
- Location within France Location within Nouvelle-Aquitaine
- Coordinates: 43°15′06″N 0°42′18″W
- Country: France
- Region: Nouvelle-Aquitaine
- Department: Pyrénées-Atlantiques
- Arrondissement: Oloron-Sainte-Marie
- Canton: Oloron-Sainte-Marie-1
- Intercommunality: CC Haut Béarn

Government
  - Mayor (2020–2026): Claude Lacour
- Area^{1}: 6.57 km^{2} (2.54 sq mi)
- Elevation: 183 m (600 ft)
- Highest elevation: 301 m (988 ft)
- Lowest elevation: 167 m (548 ft)
- Population (2023): 261
  - Density: 39.7/km^{2} (103/sq mi)
- Time zone: UTC+01:00 (CET)
  - Summer (DST): UTC+02:00 (CEST)
- INSEE/Postal code: 64244 /64400
- ^{1} French Land Register data, which excludes lakes, ponds, glaciers > 1 km^{2} (0.386 sq mi or 247 acres) and river estuaries.

Geüs-d'Oloron (Occitan: Gèus d'Auloron) is a commune in the Pyrénées-Atlantiques department in south-western France.

== See also ==
- Communes of the Pyrénées-Atlantiques department
