= Canton of Oloron-Sainte-Marie-1 =

Coordinates: 43.19°N 0.62°W

The canton of Oloron-Sainte-Marie-1 is an administrative division of the Pyrénées-Atlantiques department, southwestern France. It was created at the French canton reorganisation which came into effect in March 2015. Its seat is in Oloron-Sainte-Marie.

It consists of the following communes:

1. Accous
2. Agnos
3. Ance Féas
4. Aramits
5. Aren
6. Arette
7. Asasp-Arros
8. Aydius
9. Bedous
10. Bidos
11. Borce
12. Cette-Eygun
13. Escot
14. Esquiule
15. Etsaut
16. Eysus
17. Géronce
18. Geüs-d'Oloron
19. Gurmençon
20. Issor
21. Lanne-en-Barétous
22. Lées-Athas
23. Lescun
24. Lourdios-Ichère
25. Lurbe-Saint-Christau
26. Moumour
27. Oloron-Sainte-Marie (partly)
28. Orin
29. Osse-en-Aspe
30. Préchacq-Josbaig
31. Saint-Goin
32. Sarrance
33. Urdos
