= Bidos =

- Commune
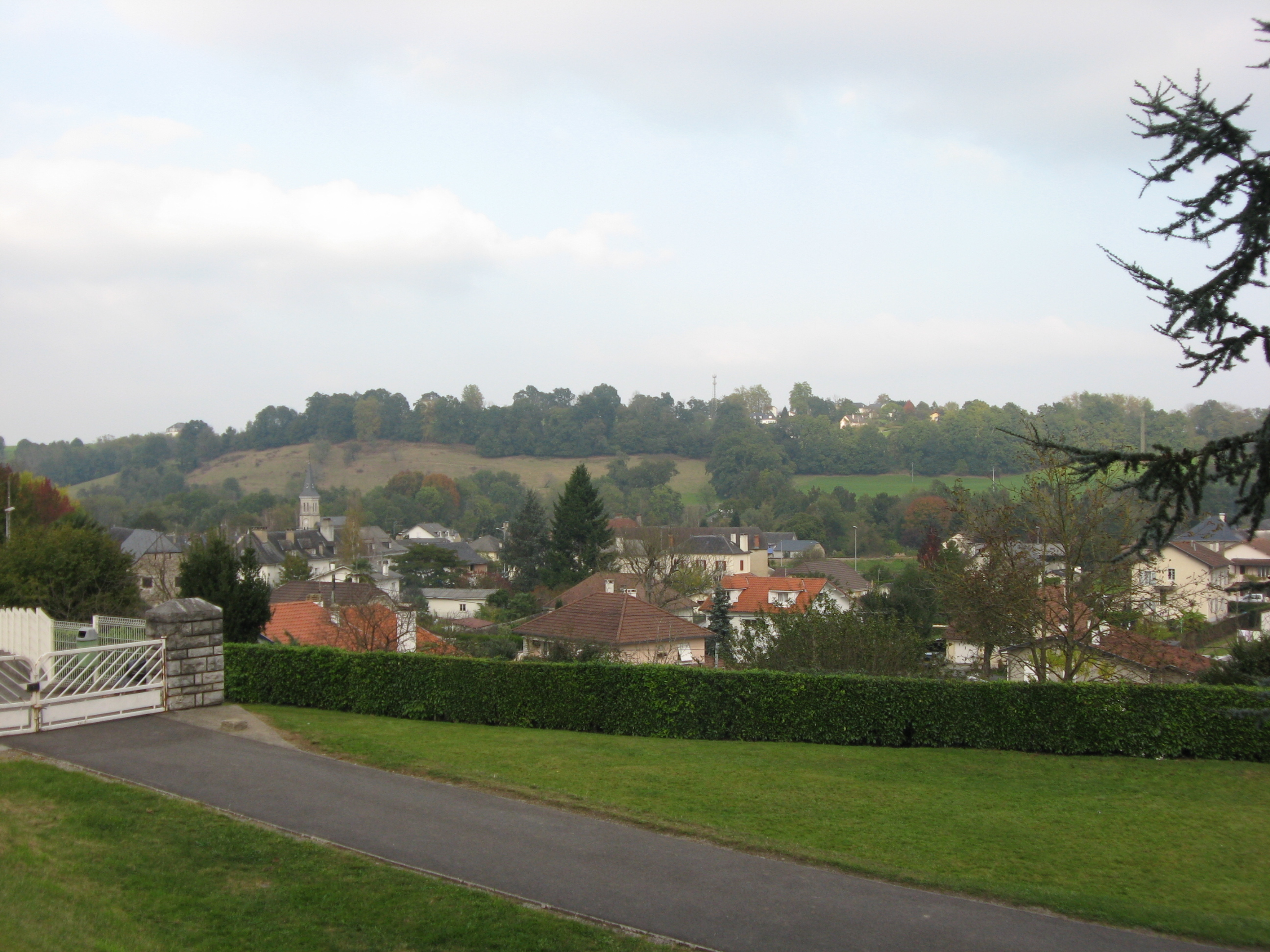
- A general view of Bidos
- Location of Bidos
- Location within France Location within Nouvelle-Aquitaine
- Coordinates: 43°10′45″N 0°36′17″W
- Country: France
- Region: Nouvelle-Aquitaine
- Department: Pyrénées-Atlantiques
- Arrondissement: Oloron-Sainte-Marie
- Canton: Oloron-Sainte-Marie-1
- Intercommunality: Haut Béarn

Government
  - Mayor (2020–2026): Françoise Assad
- Area^{1}: 1.36 km^{2} (0.53 sq mi)
- Elevation: 228 m (748 ft)
- Highest elevation: 267 m (876 ft)
- Lowest elevation: 213 m (699 ft)
- Population (2023): 1,102
  - Density: 810/km^{2} (2,100/sq mi)
- Time zone: UTC+01:00 (CET)
  - Summer (DST): UTC+02:00 (CEST)
- INSEE/Postal code: 64126 /64400
- ^{1} French Land Register data, which excludes lakes, ponds, glaciers > 1 km^{2} (0.386 sq mi or 247 acres) and river estuaries.

Bidos (French pronunciation: [bidɔs]; Occitan: Bidòs) is a commune of the Pyrénées-Atlantiques department in southwestern France.

== See also ==
- Communes of the Pyrénées-Atlantiques department
