= Orin, Pyrénées-Atlantiques =

Orin
- Commune
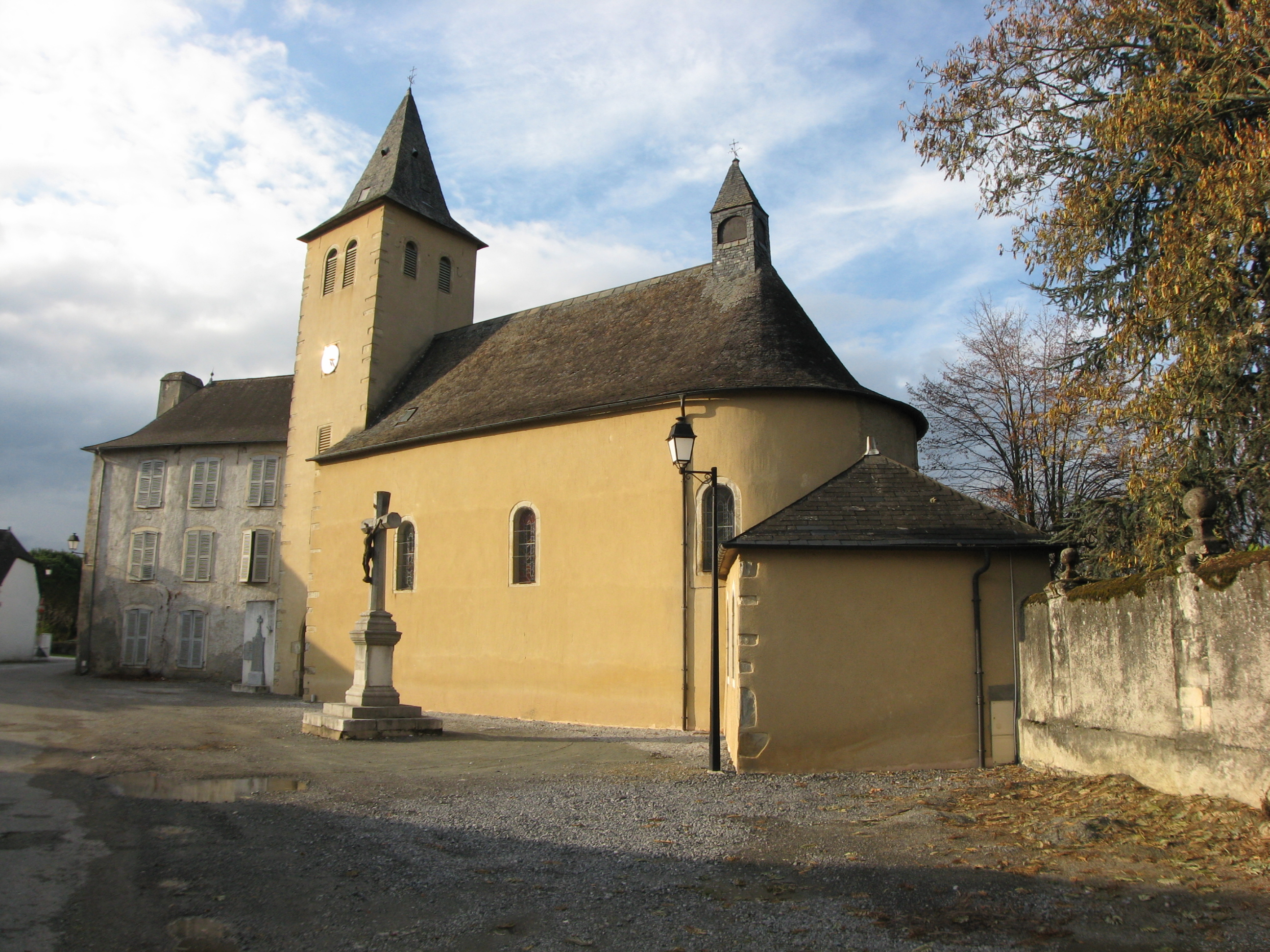
- The church of Orin
- Location of Orin
- Location within France Location within Nouvelle-Aquitaine
- Coordinates: 43°13′59″N 0°40′17″W
- Country: France
- Region: Nouvelle-Aquitaine
- Department: Pyrénées-Atlantiques
- Arrondissement: Oloron-Sainte-Marie
- Canton: Oloron-Sainte-Marie-1

Government
  - Mayor (2020–2026): Muriel Biot
- Area^{1}: 4 km^{2} (1.5 sq mi)
- Elevation: 192 m (630 ft)
- Highest elevation: 229 m (751 ft)
- Lowest elevation: 175 m (574 ft)
- Population (2023): 269
  - Density: 67/km^{2} (170/sq mi)
- Time zone: UTC+01:00 (CET)
  - Summer (DST): UTC+02:00 (CEST)
- INSEE/Postal code: 64426 /64400
- ^{1} French Land Register data, which excludes lakes, ponds, glaciers > 1 km^{2} (0.386 sq mi or 247 acres) and river estuaries.

Orin (French pronunciation: [ɔʁɛ̃]; Occitan: Aurin) is a commune in the Pyrénées-Atlantiques department in southwestern France.

== See also ==
- Communes of the Pyrénées-Atlantiques department
