= Saint-Goin =

- Commune
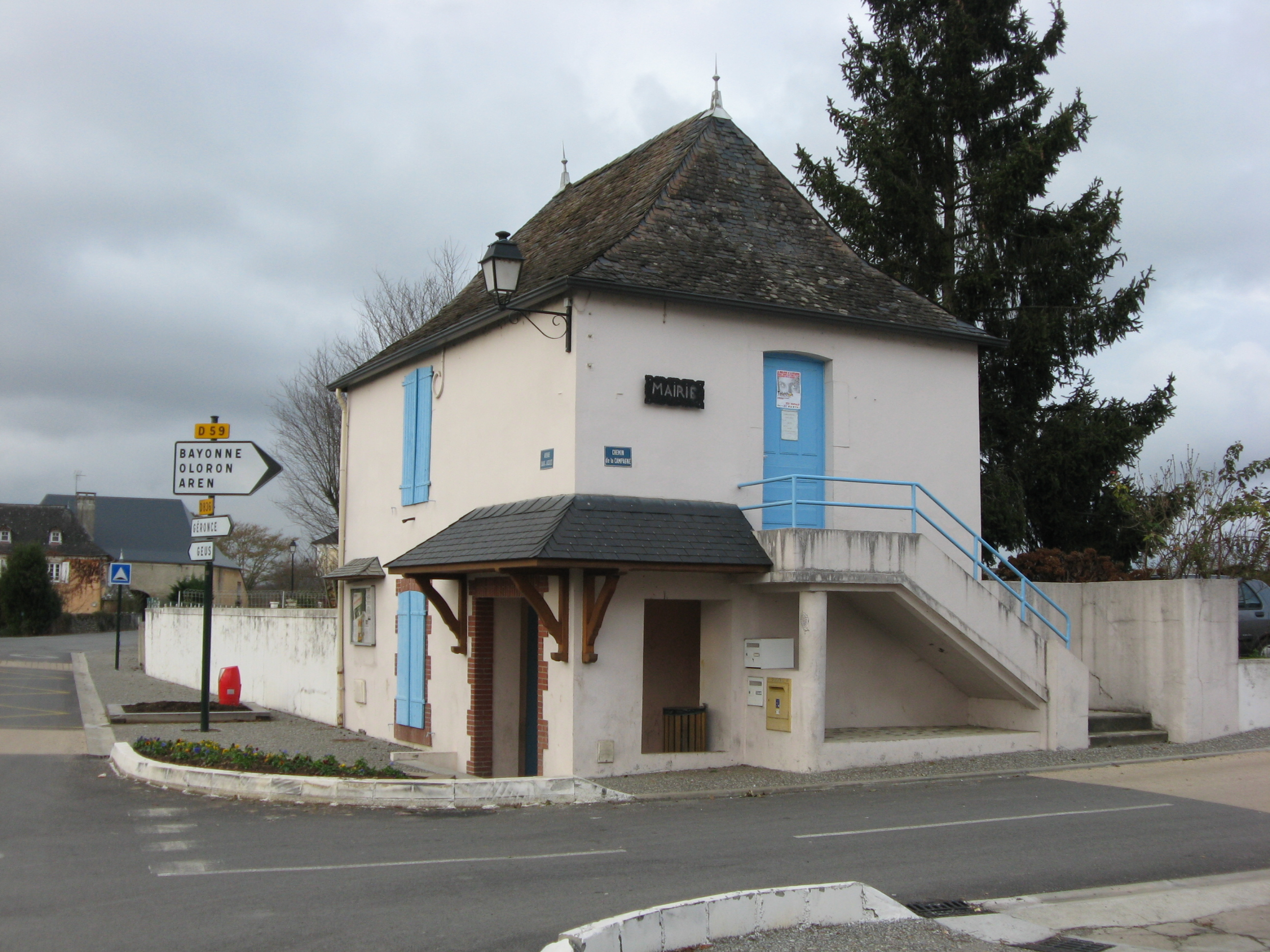
- The town hall of Saint-Goin
- Location of Saint-Goin
- Location within France Location within Nouvelle-Aquitaine
- Coordinates: 43°12′N 0°42′W
- Country: France
- Region: Nouvelle-Aquitaine
- Department: Pyrénées-Atlantiques
- Arrondissement: Oloron-Sainte-Marie
- Canton: Oloron-Sainte-Marie-1

Government
  - Mayor (2020–2026): Louis Benoit
- Area^{1}: 5.54 km^{2} (2.14 sq mi)
- Elevation: 183 m (600 ft)
- Highest elevation: 291 m (955 ft)
- Lowest elevation: 173 m (568 ft)
- Population (2023): 219
  - Density: 39.5/km^{2} (102/sq mi)
- Time zone: UTC+01:00 (CET)
  - Summer (DST): UTC+02:00 (CEST)
- INSEE/Postal code: 64481 /64400
- ^{1} French Land Register data, which excludes lakes, ponds, glaciers > 1 km^{2} (0.386 sq mi or 247 acres) and river estuaries.

Saint-Goin (French pronunciation: [sɛ̃ ɡwɛ̃]; Occitan: Sent Goen; Basque: Sangoine) is a commune in the Pyrénées-Atlantiques department in south-western France.

== See also ==
- Communes of the Pyrénées-Atlantiques department
