= Préchacq-Josbaig =

- Commune
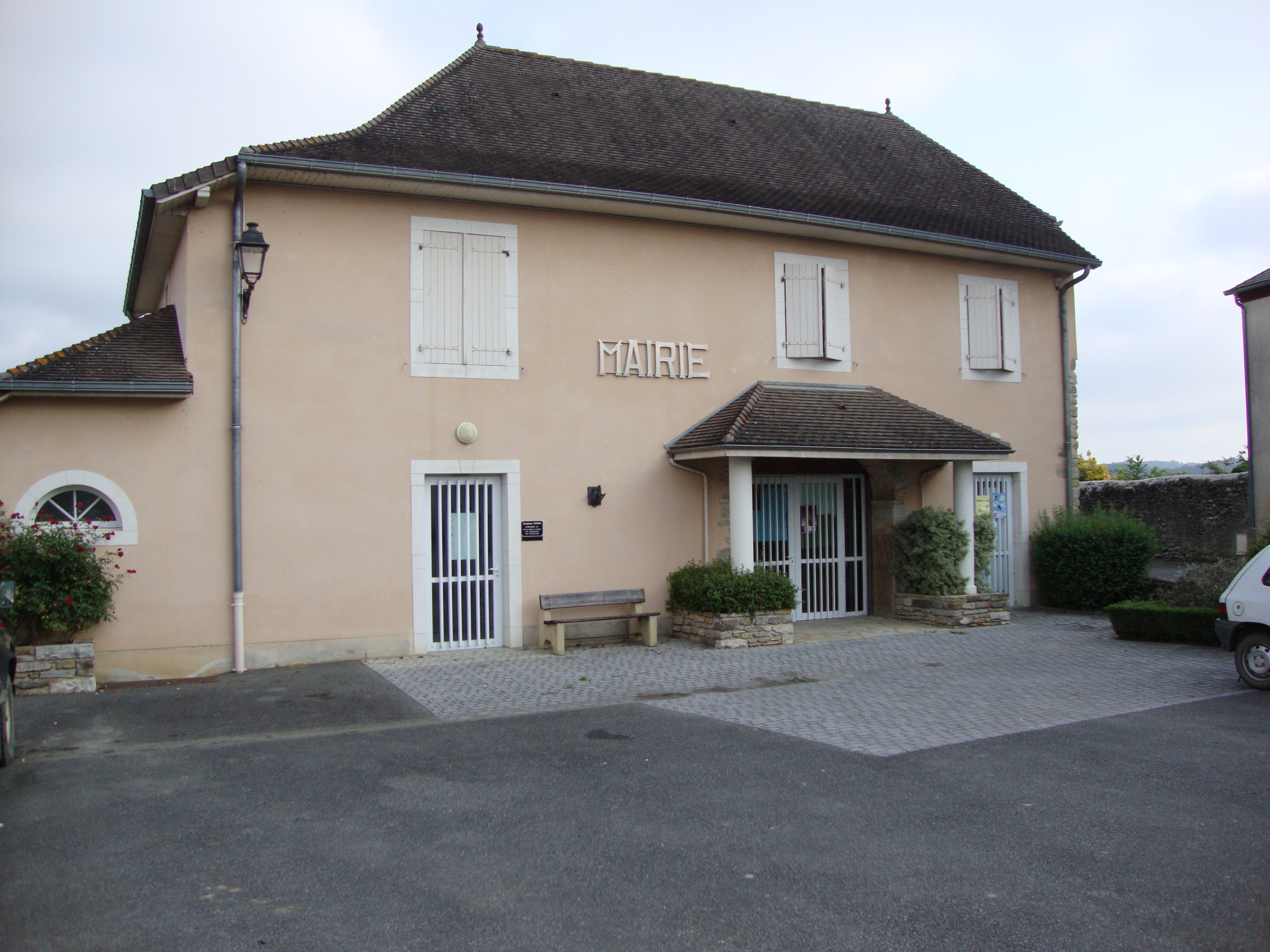
- The town hall of Préchacq-Josbaig
- Location of Préchacq-Josbaig
- Location within France Location within Nouvelle-Aquitaine
- Coordinates: 43°16′N 0°43′W
- Country: France
- Region: Nouvelle-Aquitaine
- Department: Pyrénées-Atlantiques
- Arrondissement: Oloron-Sainte-Marie
- Canton: Oloron-Sainte-Marie-1

Government
  - Mayor (2020–2026): Marie Annie Fournier
- Area^{1}: 8.31 km^{2} (3.21 sq mi)
- Elevation: 157 m (515 ft)
- Highest elevation: 248 m (814 ft)
- Lowest elevation: 135 m (443 ft)
- Population (2023): 299
  - Density: 36.0/km^{2} (93.2/sq mi)
- Time zone: UTC+01:00 (CET)
  - Summer (DST): UTC+02:00 (CEST)
- INSEE/Postal code: 64458 /64190
- ^{1} French Land Register data, which excludes lakes, ponds, glaciers > 1 km^{2} (0.386 sq mi or 247 acres) and river estuaries.

Préchacq-Josbaig (French pronunciation: [pʁeʃak ʒɔsbɛ]; Occitan: Preishac de Geusvath; Basque: Josibaia) is a commune in the Pyrénées-Atlantiques department in south-western France.

== See also ==
- Communes of the Pyrénées-Atlantiques department
