= Esquiule =

Esquiule Eskiula
- Commune
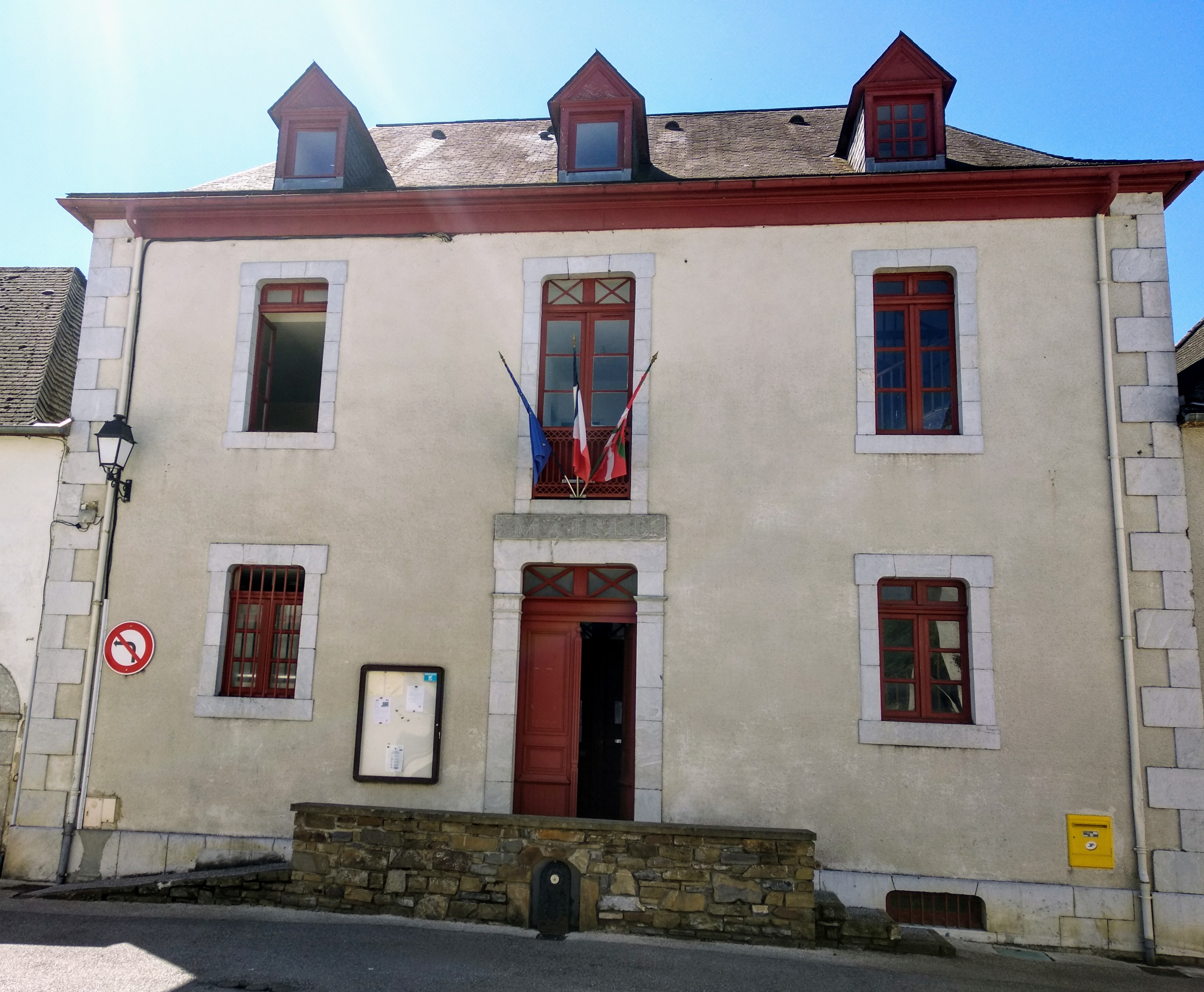
- Town hall
- Location of Esquiule
- Location within France Location within Nouvelle-Aquitaine
- Coordinates: 43°11′41″N 0°42′25″W
- Country: France
- Region: Nouvelle-Aquitaine
- Department: Pyrénées-Atlantiques
- Arrondissement: Oloron-Sainte-Marie
- Canton: Oloron-Sainte-Marie-1

Government
  - Mayor (2026–32): Nathalie Coronas
- Area^{1}: 28.58 km^{2} (11.03 sq mi)
- Elevation: 198 m (650 ft)
- Highest elevation: 661 m (2,169 ft)
- Lowest elevation: 190 m (620 ft)
- Population (2023): 522
  - Density: 18.3/km^{2} (47.3/sq mi)
- Time zone: UTC+01:00 (CET)
  - Summer (DST): UTC+02:00 (CEST)
- INSEE/Postal code: 64217 /64400
- ^{1} French Land Register data, which excludes lakes, ponds, glaciers > 1 km^{2} (0.386 sq mi or 247 acres) and river estuaries.

Esquiule (French pronunciation: [ɛskjul]; Basque: Eskiula; Occitan: Esquiula) is a commune in the Pyrénées-Atlantiques department in south-western France.

It is located in the former province of Béarn. It stands out as an outpost of the Basque area of Soule, the village being historically Basque speaking. It has often played host to the carnivalesque performances known as maskaradak and its inhabitants arranged and performed one traditional theatre piece of Soule (pastorala) under the title Madalena de Jaureguiberry in 2000.

== See also ==
- Communes of the Pyrénées-Atlantiques department
