= Asasp-Arros =

- Commune
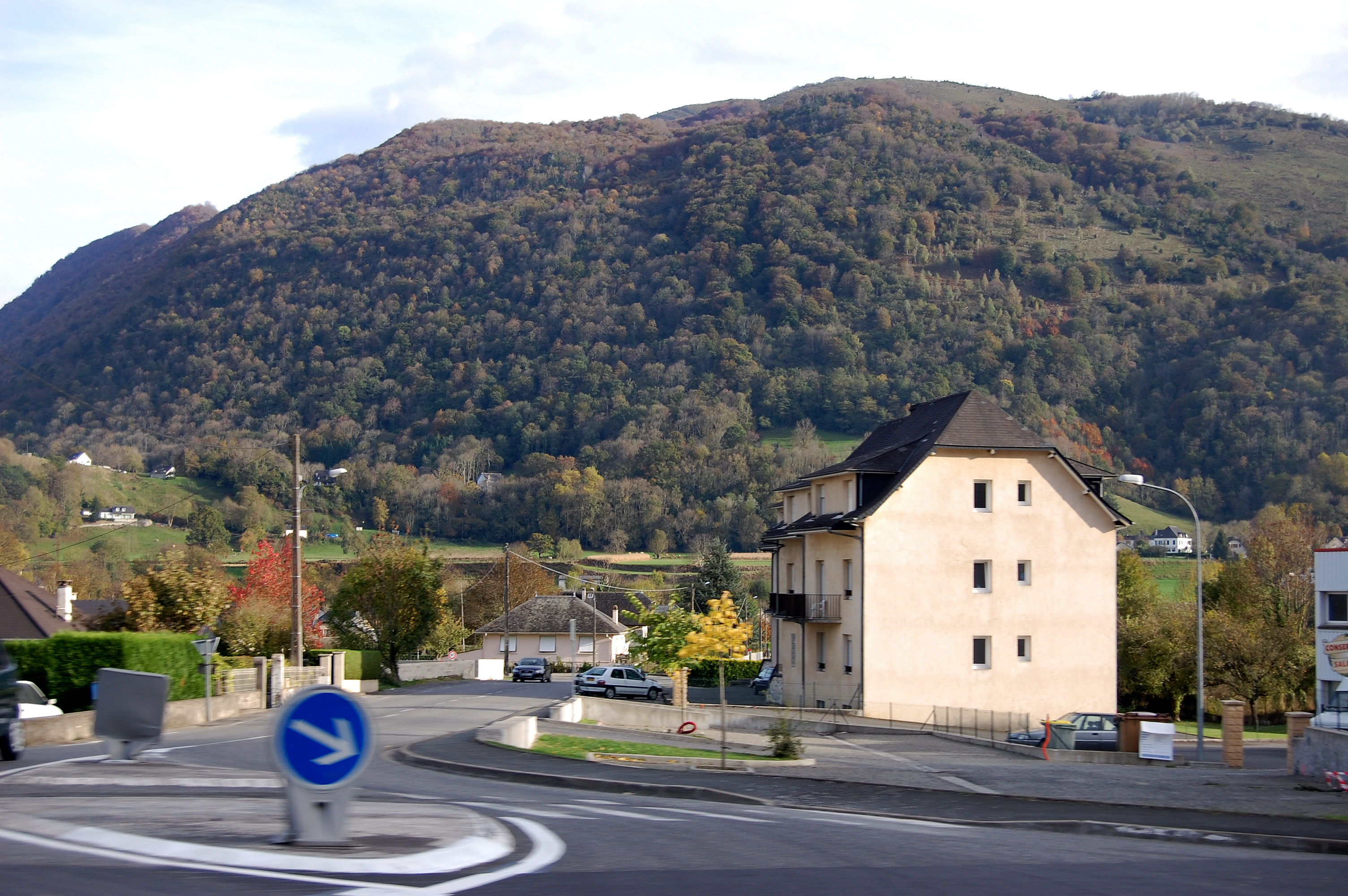
- A general view of Asasp-Arros
- Location of Asasp-Arros
- Location within France Location within Nouvelle-Aquitaine
- Coordinates: 43°07′24″N 0°36′45″W
- Country: France
- Region: Nouvelle-Aquitaine
- Department: Pyrénées-Atlantiques
- Arrondissement: Oloron-Sainte-Marie
- Canton: Oloron-Sainte-Marie-1
- Intercommunality: Haut Béarn

Government
  - Mayor (2020–2026): Roland Benoît Laperne
- Area^{1}: 23.59 km^{2} (9.11 sq mi)
- Elevation: 300 m (980 ft)
- Highest elevation: 1,093 m (3,586 ft)
- Lowest elevation: 243 m (797 ft)
- Population (2023): 516
  - Density: 21.9/km^{2} (56.7/sq mi)
- Time zone: UTC+01:00 (CET)
  - Summer (DST): UTC+02:00 (CEST)
- INSEE/Postal code: 64064 /64660
- ^{1} French Land Register data, which excludes lakes, ponds, glaciers > 1 km^{2} (0.386 sq mi or 247 acres) and river estuaries.

Asasp-Arros (French pronunciation: [asasp aʁɔs]; Occitan: Asasp e Arròs) is a commune in the Pyrénées-Atlantiques department in the Nouvelle-Aquitaine region of south-western France.

== Geography ==
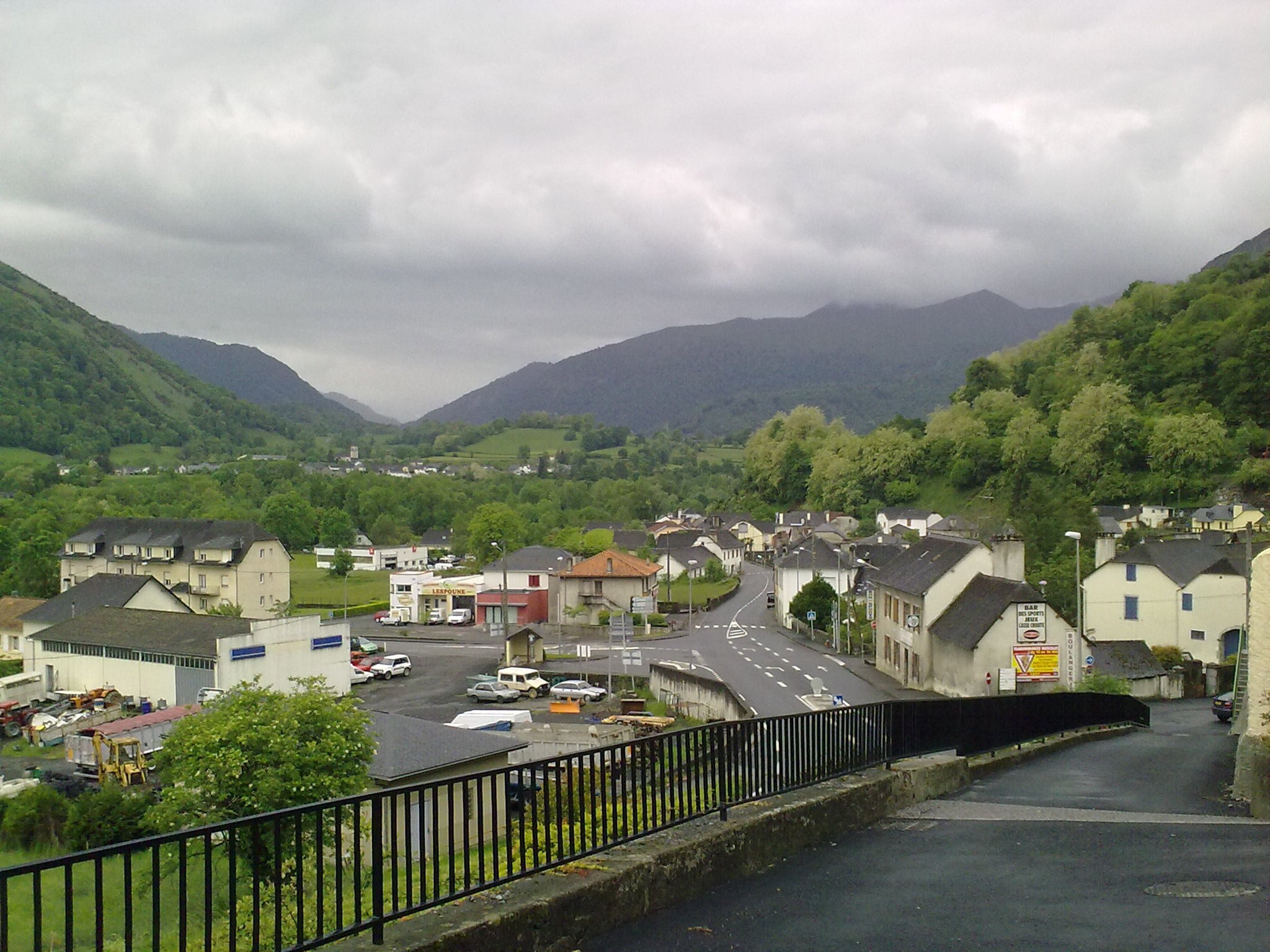
Asasp-Arros from the Town Hall.

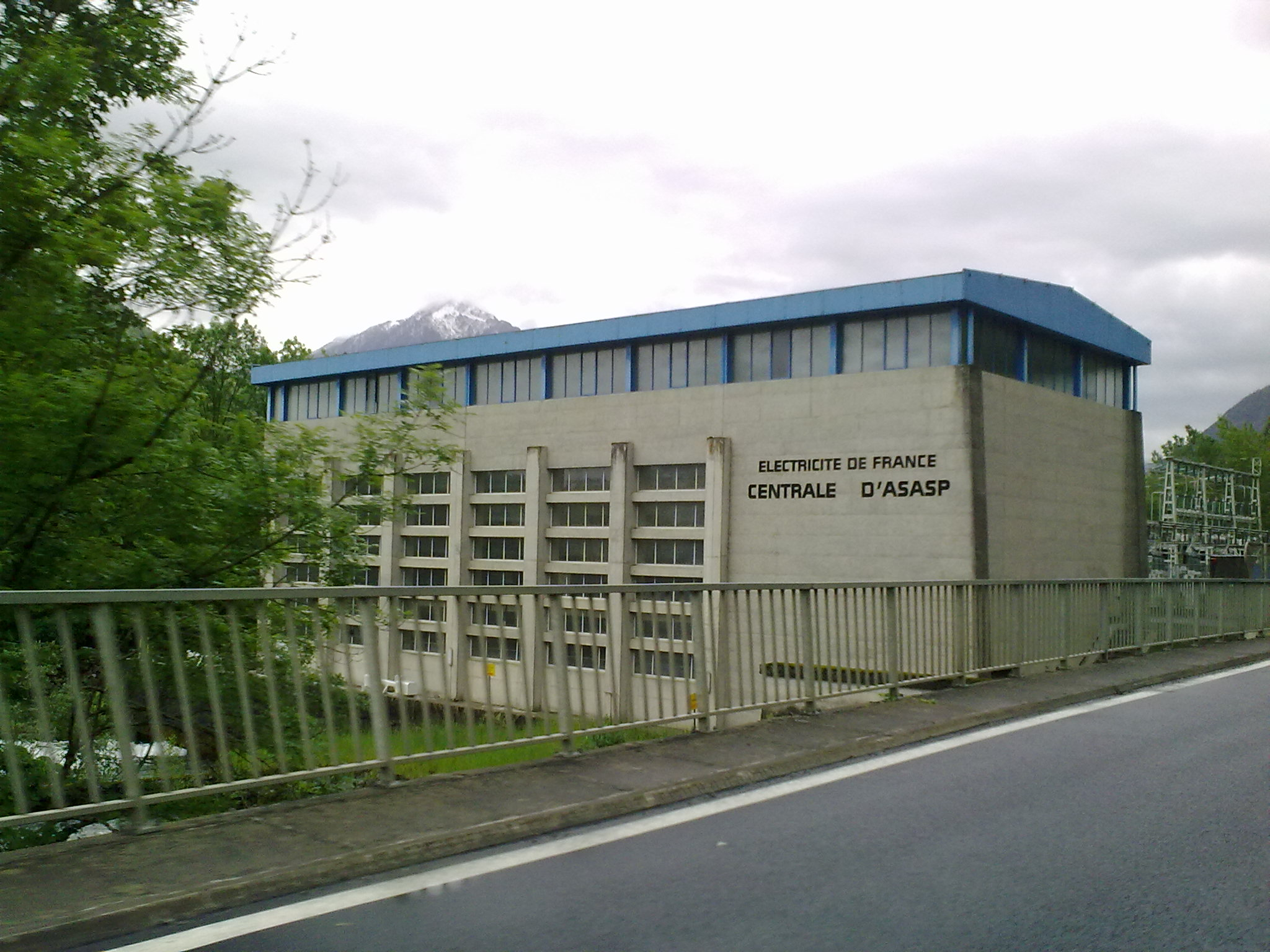
Hydro-electric power plant in Asasp-Arros.

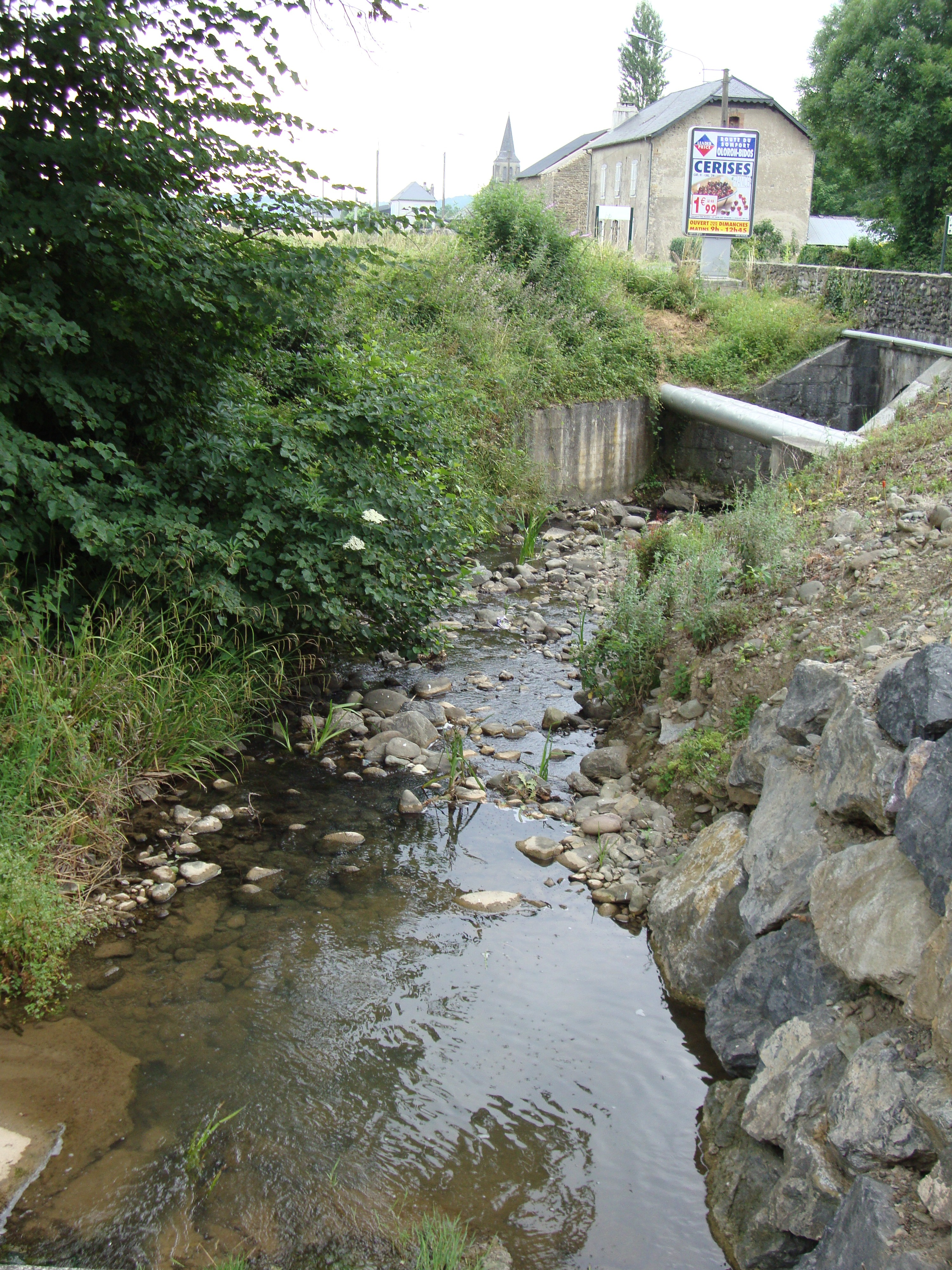
The Toupiette at Arros

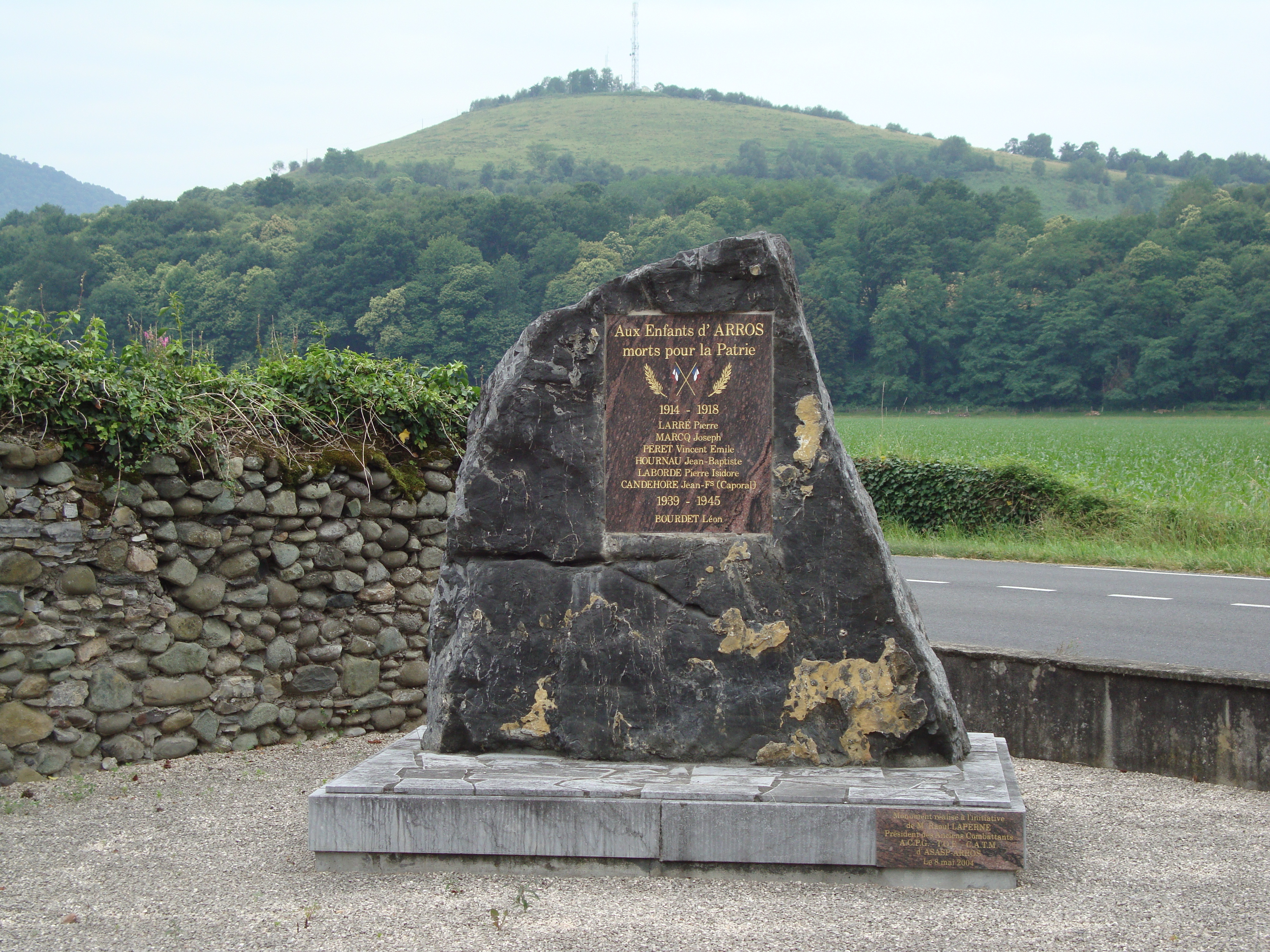
War Memorial at Arros

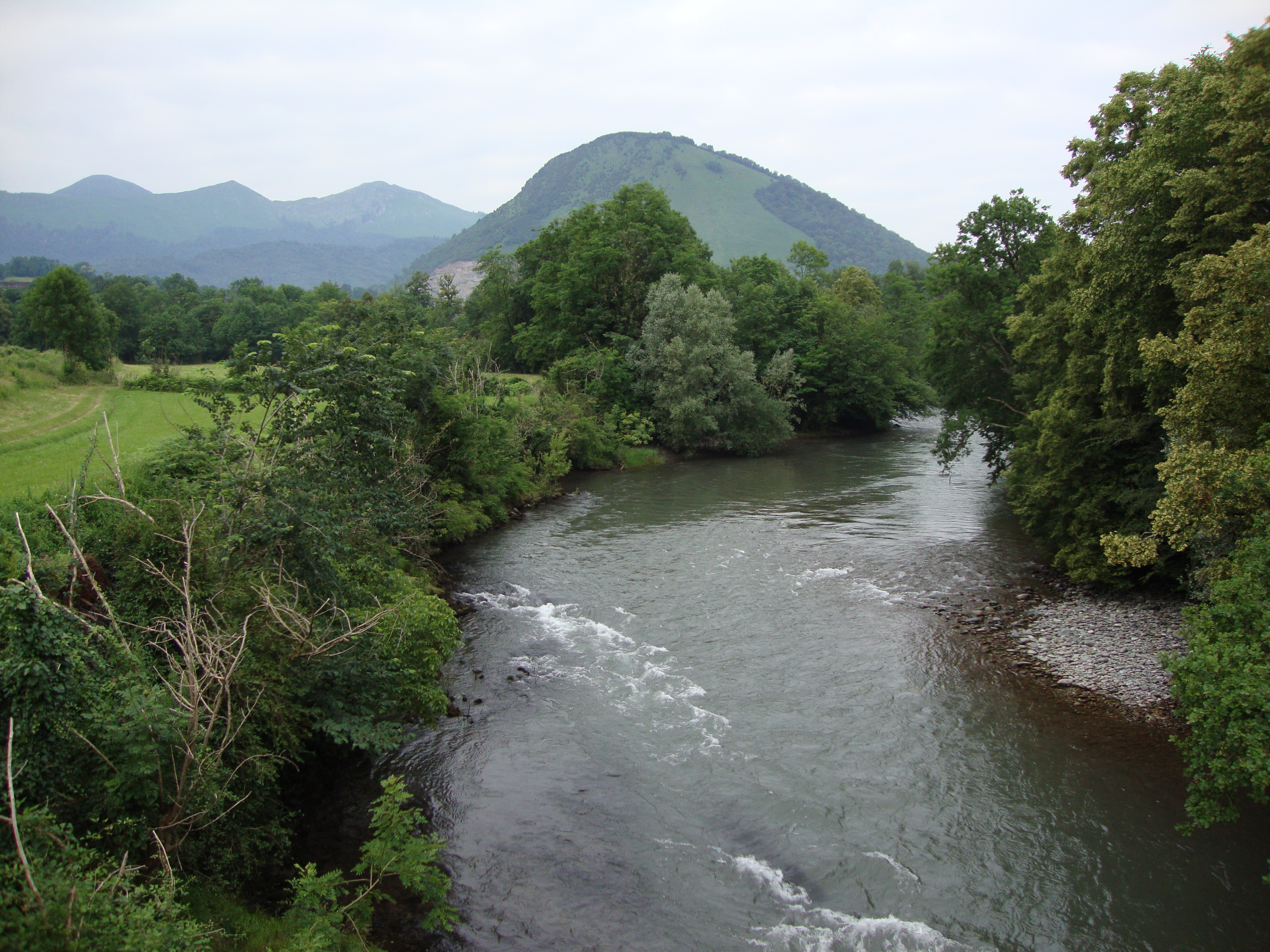
Gave d'Aspe at Asasp

Asasp-Arros is located six km south of Oloron-Sainte-Marie on the left bank of the Gave d'Aspe and straddling the old royal route built by Louis XIV to Canfranc in Spain. The commune consists of two portions joined by a narrow neck of land just south-west of Lurbe-Saint-Christau. Access to the commune is by Route nationale N134 (European route E7) from Gurmençon in the north passing through the length of the commune and the village and continuing to Sarrance in the south. The D918 road comes from Issor in the west then goes east from the village over the mountains to Arudy. The southern portion of the commune is heavily forested with few farms while the northern also has extensive forests but with about 40% of the land area farmland.

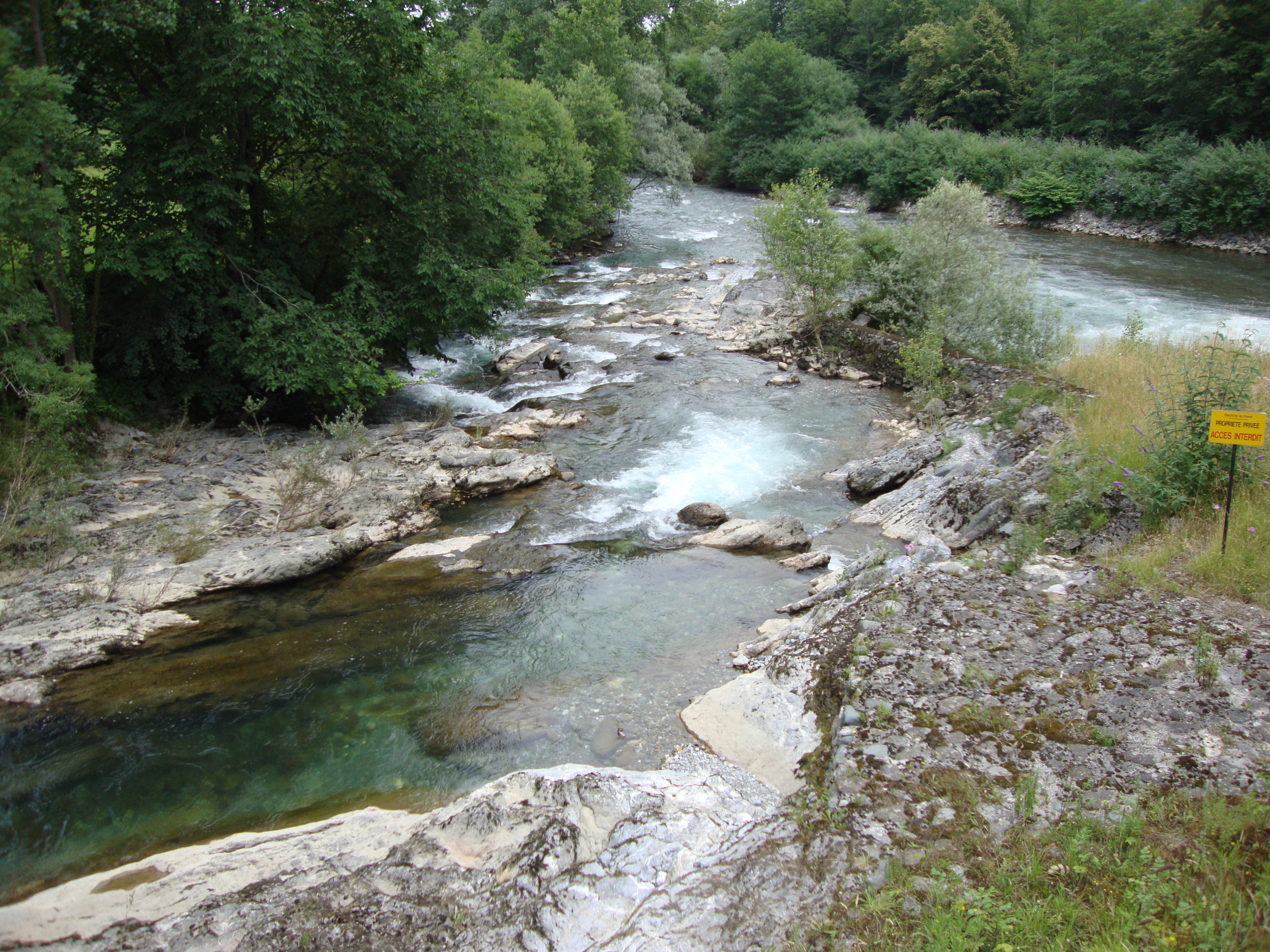
Confluence of the Gave d'Aspe and the Gave de Lourdios

The commune is part of the Drainage basin of the Adour with the Gave d'Aspe forming its entire eastern border as it flows north to join the Gave d'Oloron at Oloron-Sainte-Marie. Many tributaries flow into the Gave d'Aspe in the commune. From south to north these are: the Soum de Bordettes, the Ruisseau des Cournales, the Ruisseau de Labatnere, the Gave de Lourdios at the neck of the commune, and the Ruisseau Toupiette. In the west of the commune the Mielle river flows north with several tributaries rising in the commune: the Arrec de Bernet, the Arrec de Termy, the Arrec de Cazaux, and the Arrec de Sarraude. The Mielle continues north to join the Gave d'Oloron south-east of Moumour.

=== Places and Hamlets ===
- Arenguet
- Arripe
- Arros
- Asasp
- Athay (rock)
- Auquis
- Ayestène
- Bellevue
- Bernet
- Bordis
- Boumayou
- Bourderot (Mill)
- La Bourdette
- Bourdette (Soum des)
- Cambet (Pass - 578 metres)
- Carrère
- Casaudoumecq
- Castets
- Cazaux
- Chichet
- Cousté
- Croharé
- Esparbé (Talou of)
- Estrabeau
- Feugas
- Fouistou
- Garay (Forest)
- Gouadain
- Granet
- Hourc-Gros
- Les Indes
- Jeannot
- Jean-Petit
- Juncas
- Labatnère
- Laborde
- Lacabe
- Lacanette (fountain)
- Le Lagnos
- Lalanne
- Lalanne (calvary)
- Lassalette de l'Arrayous
- Lestelle
- Les Louzères
- Magendie
- Maunas
- Minvielle
- Mirandette
- Monlong
- Le Pacq
- Payssas
- Perte
- Peyre
- Poey
- Pucheu
- Ségu
- Serrelongue (Forest)
- Serre-Sècque (Pass - 509 metres)
- Soum Artigue
- Tachouas
- Termy (Forest)

== Toponymy ==
The name Asasp appears in the forms:

- Asap (1364, Fors de Béarn),
- Azasp (1375, Contracts of Luntz),
- Asasp (around 1630, by Pierre de Marca, History of Béarn), and
- Asasp on the Cassini Map in 1750

Michel Grosclaude indicated that Asasp is related to the basque as/aitz ("rocky point") and aspi ("behind"), giving "behind the rocky point".

The name Arros is mentioned in the 12th century (Titles of Gabas) and also in:

- 1220 (For of Oloron, on a copy of 1551),
- 1249 (sentence in the Josbaig, vidimus of 1464),
- 1367 (Cartulary of Oloron),
- 1380 (Departmental archives of Pyrénées-Atlantiques), and
- 1750 on the Cassini Map.

According to Michel Grosclaude, Arros comes from the basque radical (h)arr ("stone") or from a former owner called Arro, in each of the two possibilities expanded by the Aquitaine suffix -ossum, giving "place of stone" or "Domain of Arro".

From 1956 until 1971 (the date of merging with Asasp) Arros was called Arros-d'Oloron to differentiate it from Arros-de-Nay.

Its name in béarnais is Asasp-Arros.

Arripe is a farm in Asasp mentioned in 1385 (Census of Béarn).

Attay is an area in Asasp cited in the dictionary of 1863.

Boumayou is a hamlet referenced by the dictionary in 1863.

Castetgouly and Castetmans were also places in Asasp.

Caup was another name mentioned in the dictionary in 1863.

La Courtie was a place in Asasp cited by the dictionary in 1863.

Croues, another area in Asasp, appears in the Terrier of Asasp, in 1778 with the spelling Couroues.

Domec was a fief, vassal of the Viscounts of Béarn, cited in 1863 in the forms:

- Domec-Poe and la Domecq (respectively 1538 and 1546, Reformation of Béarn).

Hourcq was an area in Asasp in 1863.

Le Lagnos is a forest in Asasp, which in 1538 was called Lo Lanhos (, Reformation of Béarn).

Monlong was referenced in 1863 as a moor in Asasp as was Tachouas.

Ségu is a mountain whose slopes are in both Asasp and Issor.

== History ==
Paul Raymond noted that in 1385 Asasp had 17 fires and Arros 7. Both depended on the bailiwick of Oloron.

Arros commune had a Lay Abbey, vassal of the Viscounts of Béarn.

On 1 January 1973 (Prefectorial Order of 29 December 1972), the commune of Arros-d'Oloron (called Arros until 1956) was merged with Asasp to form the new commune of Asasp-Arros.

== Administration ==
List of Successive Mayors

From	To	Name
1995	2001	Henri Navailles
2001	2008	Vincent Poey
2008	2014	André Minjuzan
2014	2020	Bernard Mora
2020	2026	Roland Benoît Laperne

=== Inter-communality ===
The commune is part of seven inter-communal structures:

- the Communauté de communes du Haut Béarn;
- the Energy association of Pyrénées-Atlantiques;
- the association for the source of the Colombe;
- the educational regrouping association of the communes of Lurbe and Asasp-Arros;
- the television association of Oloron-Aspe Valley;
- the inter-communal association for sanitation of the gateway of the Aspe;
- the joint association for production of drinking water Jean Petit;

== Demography ==
The inhabitants of the commune are known as Asaspois or Asaspoises in French.

Historical population

Year	Pop.	±% p.a.
1793	602	—
1821	563	−0.24%
1846	718	+0.98%
1872	583	−0.80%
1901	465	−0.78%
1926	438	−0.24%
1946	407	−0.37%
1962	434	+0.40%
1968	395	−1.56%

Year	Pop.	±% p.a.
1975	566	+5.27%
1982	564	−0.05%
1990	601	+0.80%
1999	547	−1.04%
2007	520	−0.63%
2012	487	−1.30%
2017	461	−1.09%
2023	516	+1.90%

Source: EHESS and INSEE

== Economy ==
The main activity is agriculture (livestock, pasturage, polyculture). The commune is in the Appellation d'origine contrôlée (AOC) zone of Ossau-iraty. The quality of the water from the rivers allows development of Fish farming.

A Hydro-electric power station has been built at the confluence of the Gave d'Aspe and the Gave de Lourdios.

== Culture and heritage ==
=== Civil heritage ===
Until 1494 there was a dyke on the gave d'Aspe which linked Lurbe to Asasp. It was then replaced with a bridge, making the village an important stage on a secondary way on the via Podiensis (or Puy Route), one of the modern paths on the Way of St. James.

=== Religious heritage ===
There are two churches in Asasp-Arros which are listed as historical monuments. These are:

- The Parish Church of Saint-Jean-l'Évangéliste at Asasp (19th century). The church has several items registered as historical objects:
  - Main Altar and Retable (18th century)
  - Secondary Altar and Retable (18th century)
  - Painting: the Agony of Christ (17th century)
  - Choir enclosure (Communion table) (18th century)

Parish Church of Saint-Jean-l'Évangéliste

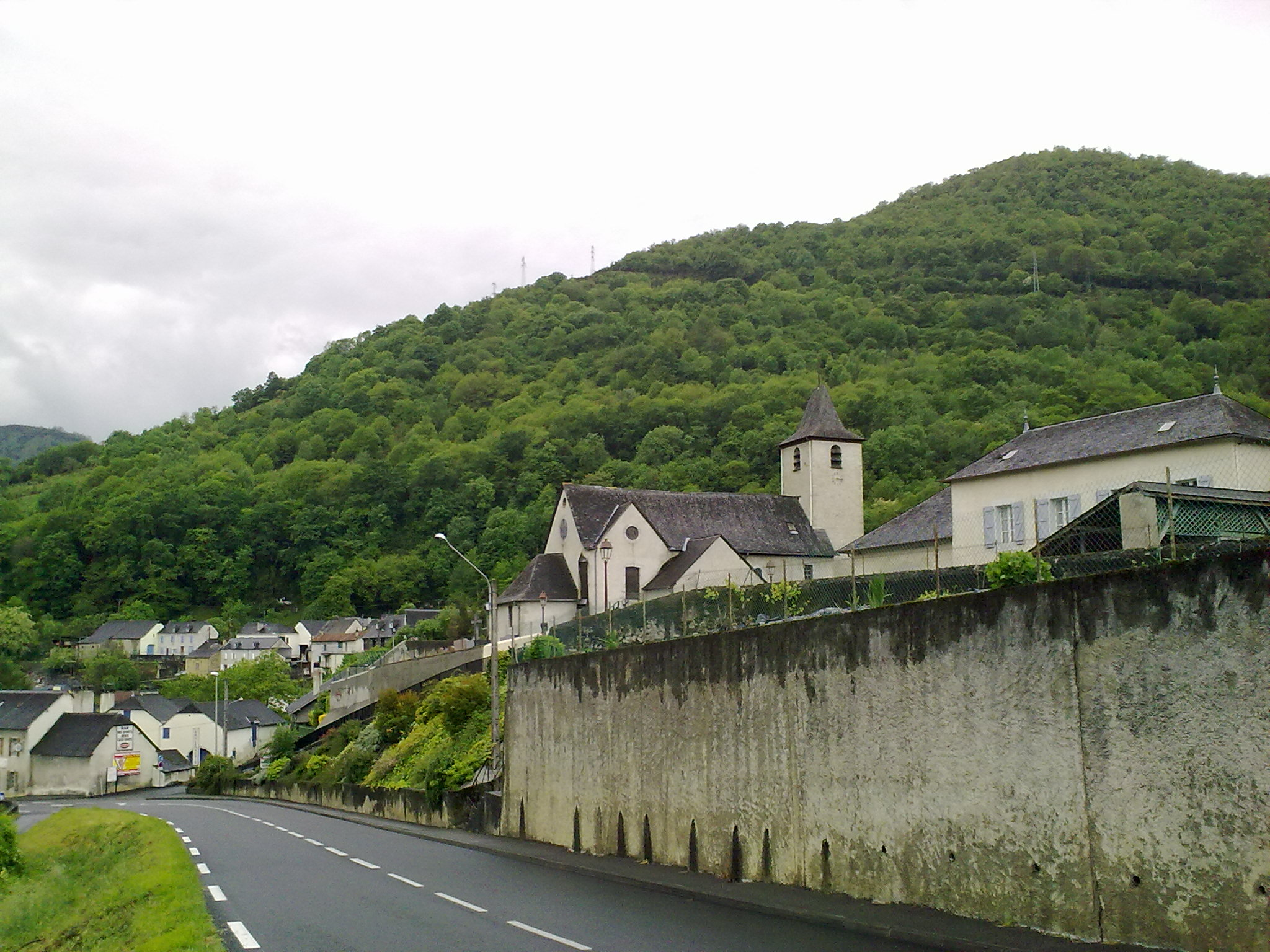
Road to the church

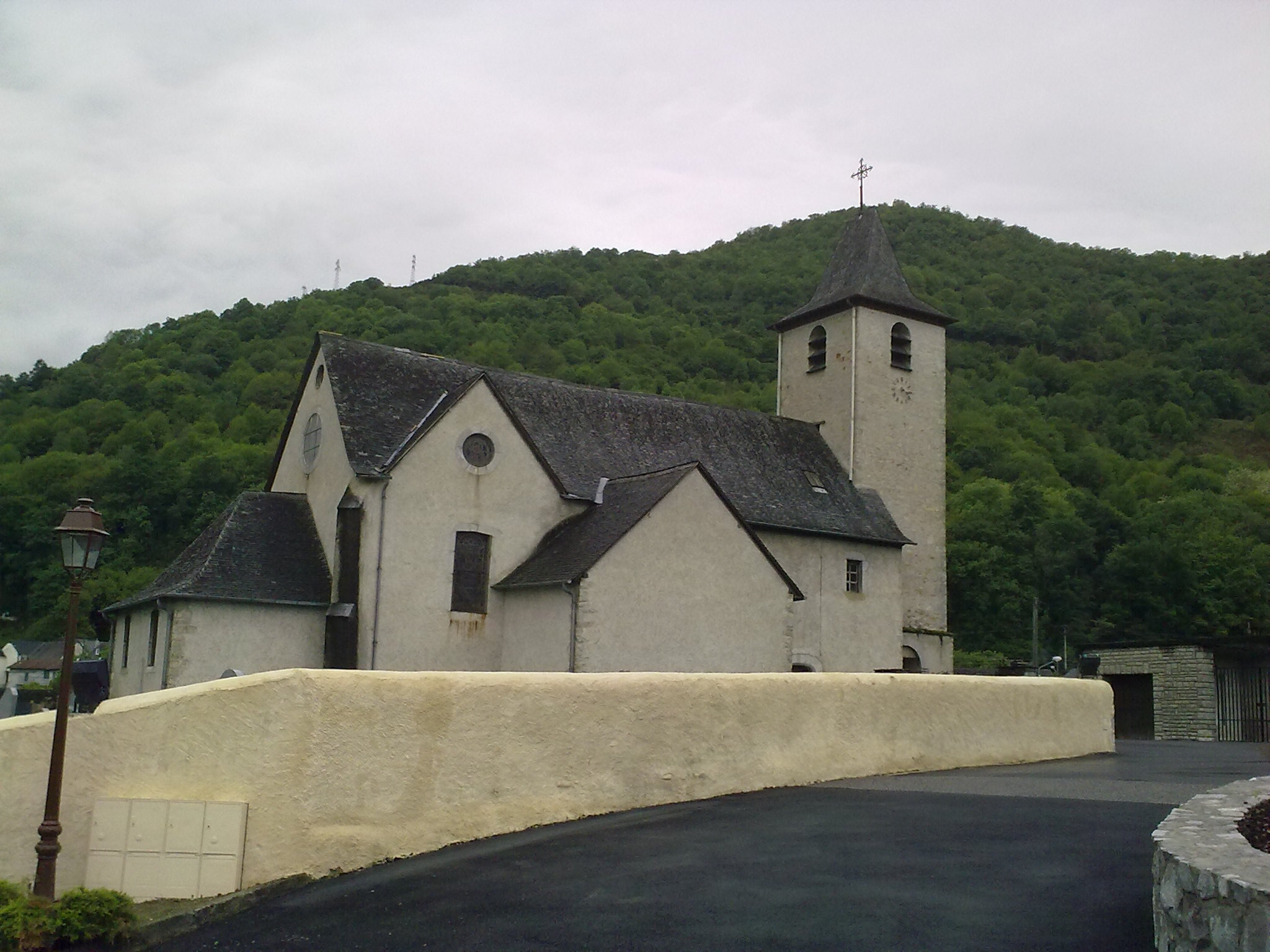
Outside view

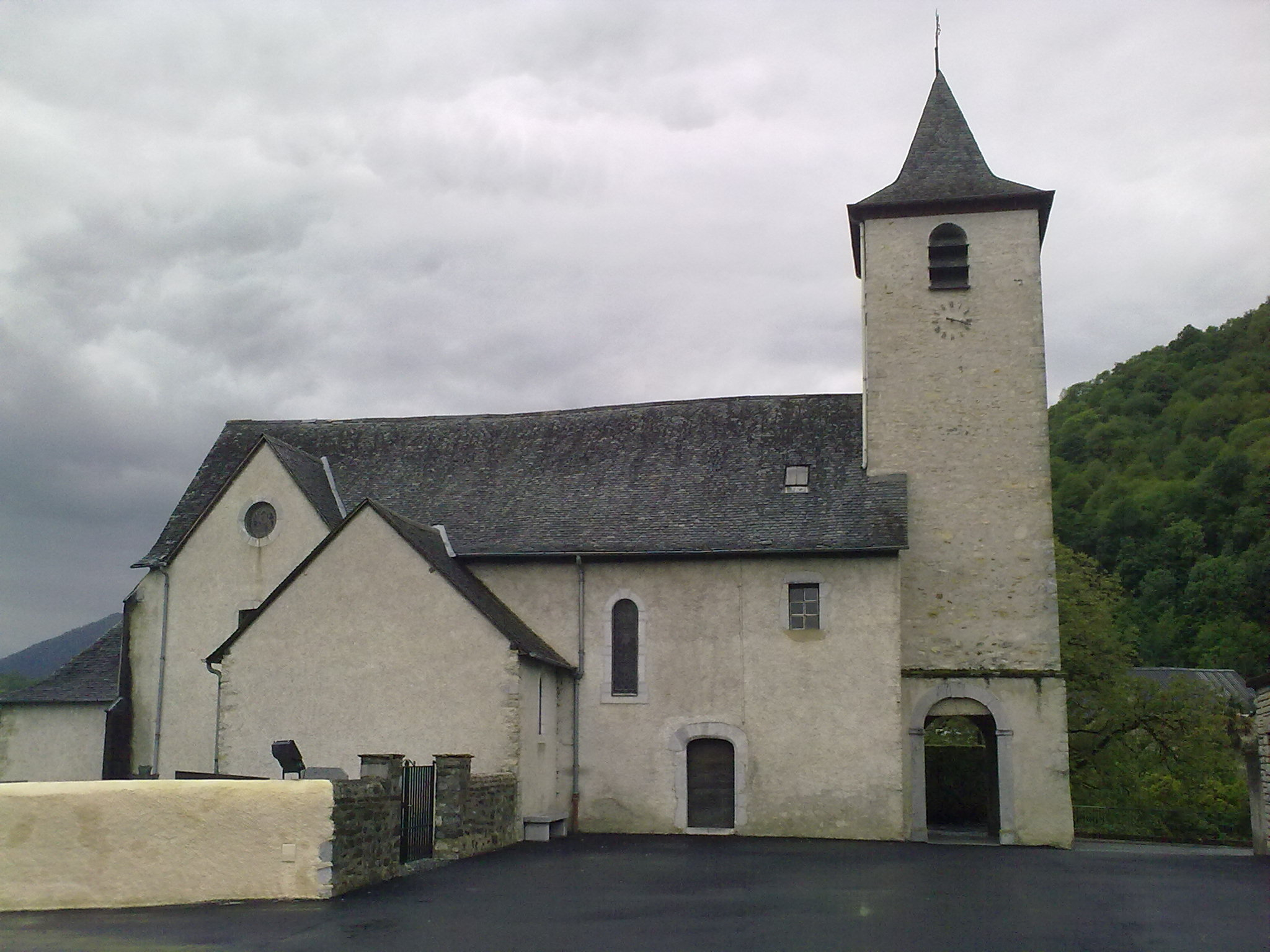
The church approach

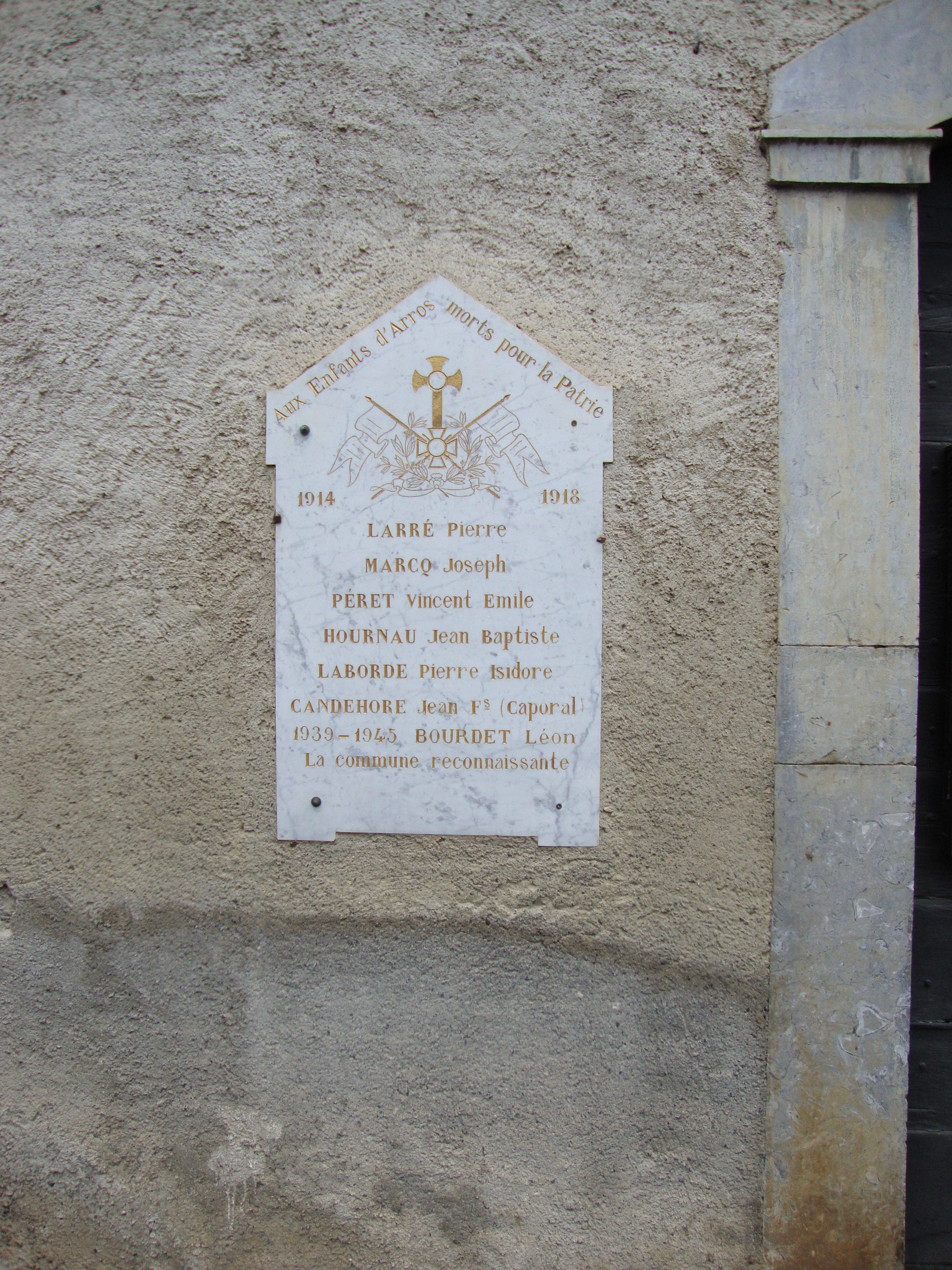
War memorial plaque on the church

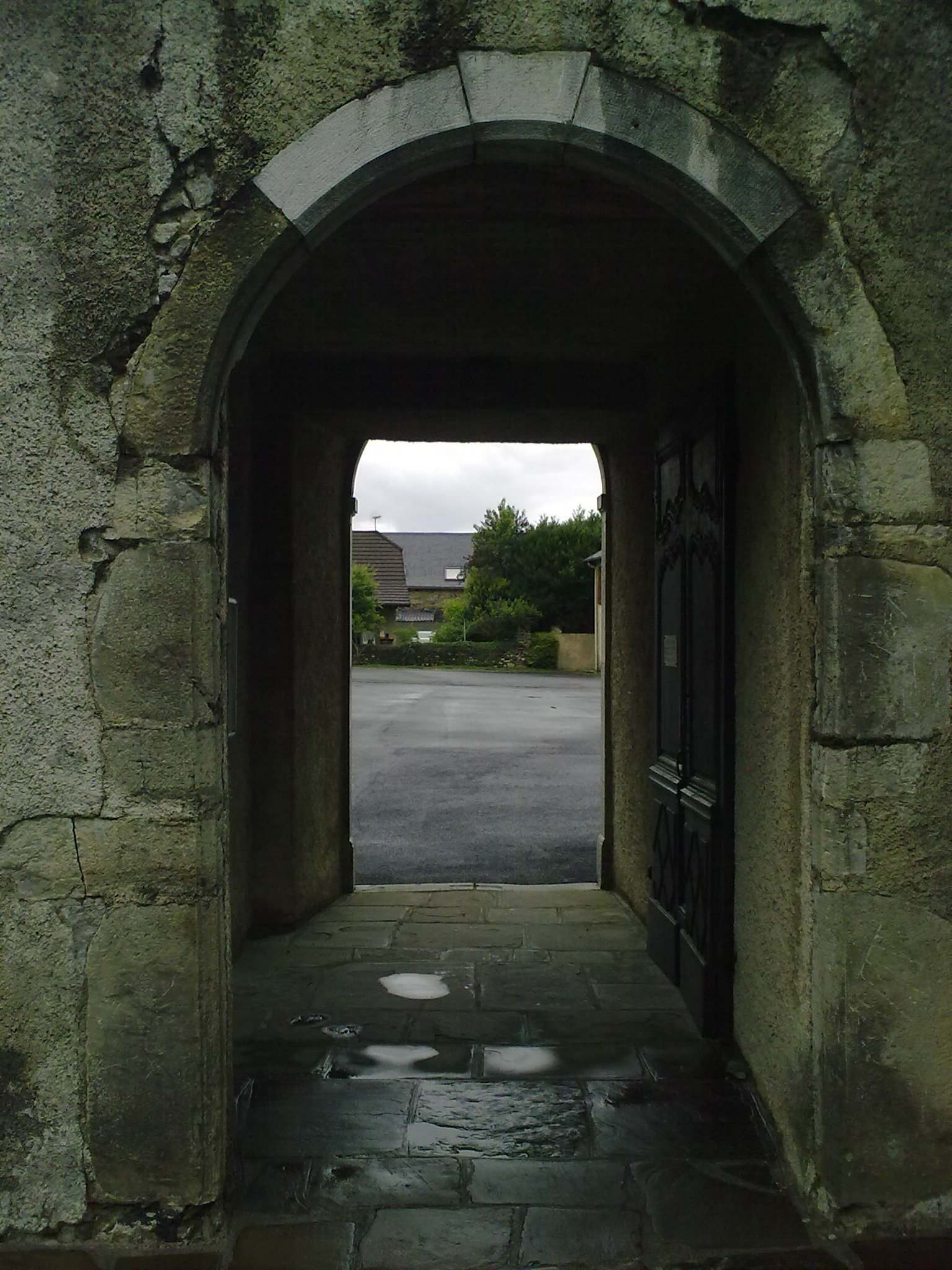
Entry to the Church

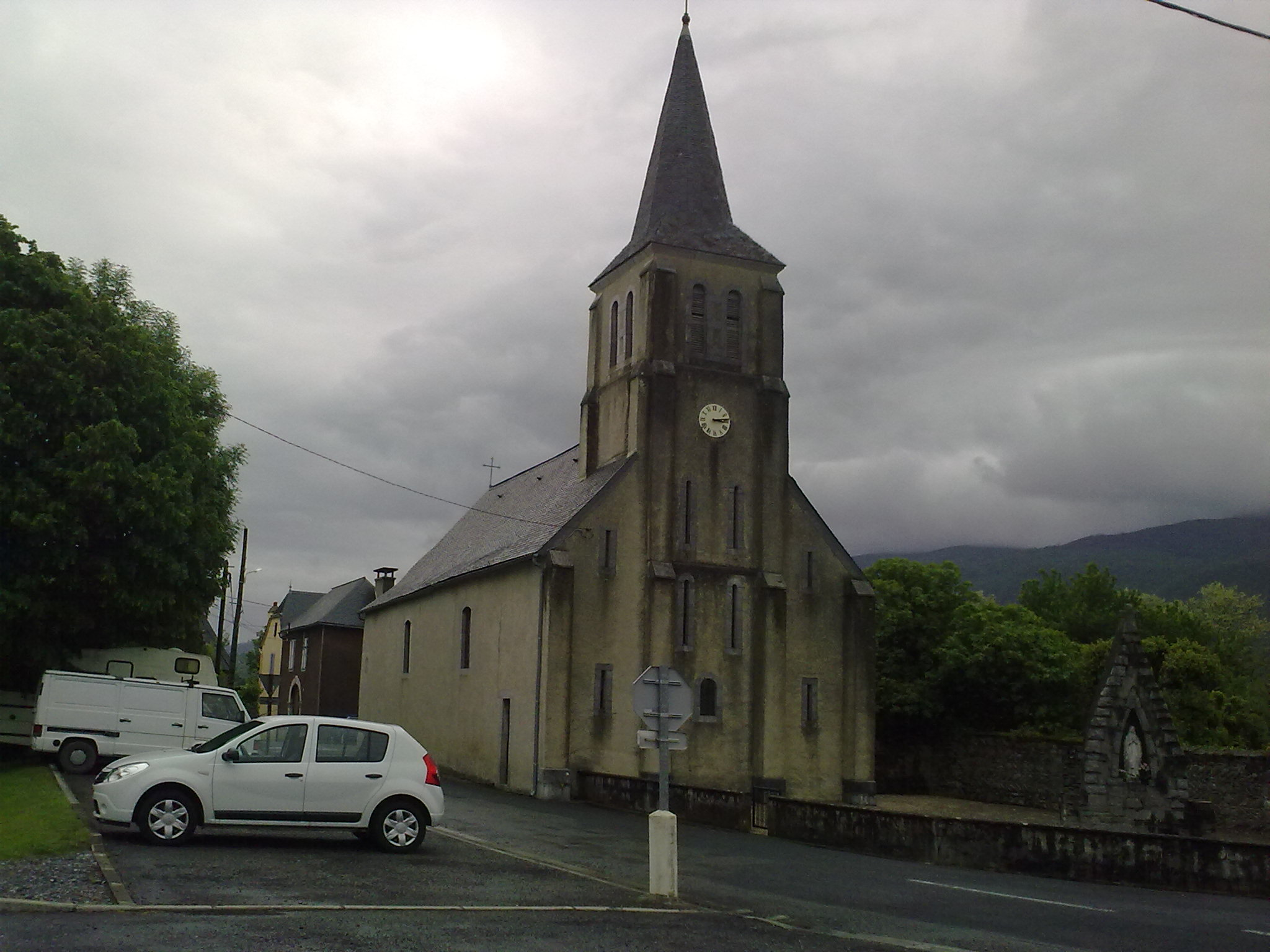
Parish Church of Saint-Vincent-Diacre

- The Parish Church of Saint-Vincent-Diacre at Arros (19th century). The church has two items registered as historical objects:
  - Secondary Altar and Retable (18th century)
  - Ceiling (18th century)

=== Environmental heritage ===
A large wooded area, with many hiking trails extends over the commune.

The peak of Bellevue, which is also called Cambet, is 681 metres high, the summit of Caut is 689 metres, the summit of Las Osques is 691 metres, and Pédeher is 712 metres. On the frontier with Issor the summit of Athay is 728 metres high and that of Ségu is 768 metres.

== Facilities ==
=== Education ===
The commune has an Elementary school.

=== Sports ===
The Rugby union club (ASAAR) plays in the championship of France in the 2nd series.

== See also ==
- Communes of the Pyrénées-Atlantiques department

=== External links ===
- Commune website (in French)
- Asasp-Arros on Géoportail, National Geographic Institute (IGN) website (in French)
- Asasp and Arros on the 1750 Cassini Map
