= Gave d'Aspe =

River in southwest France

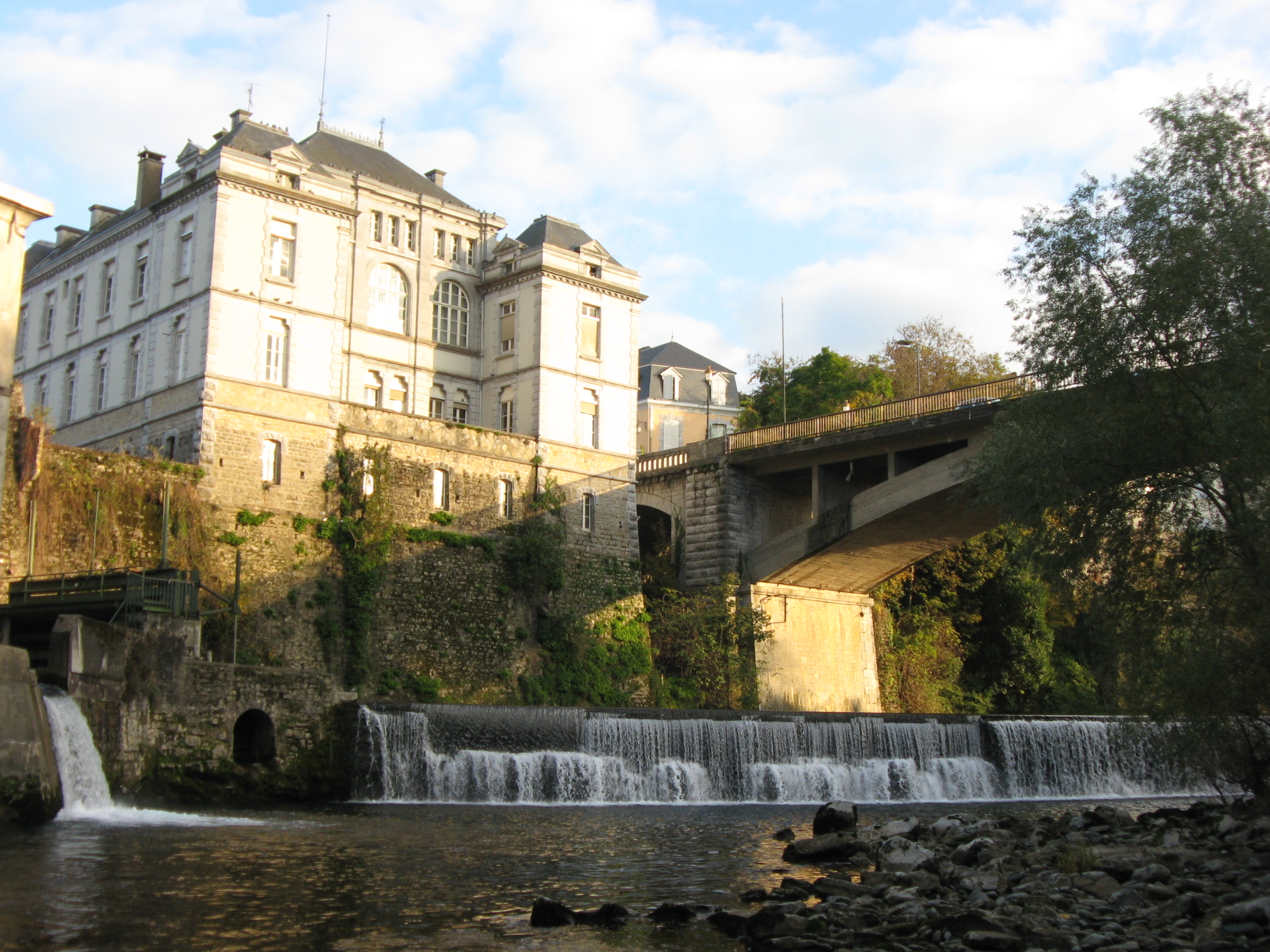

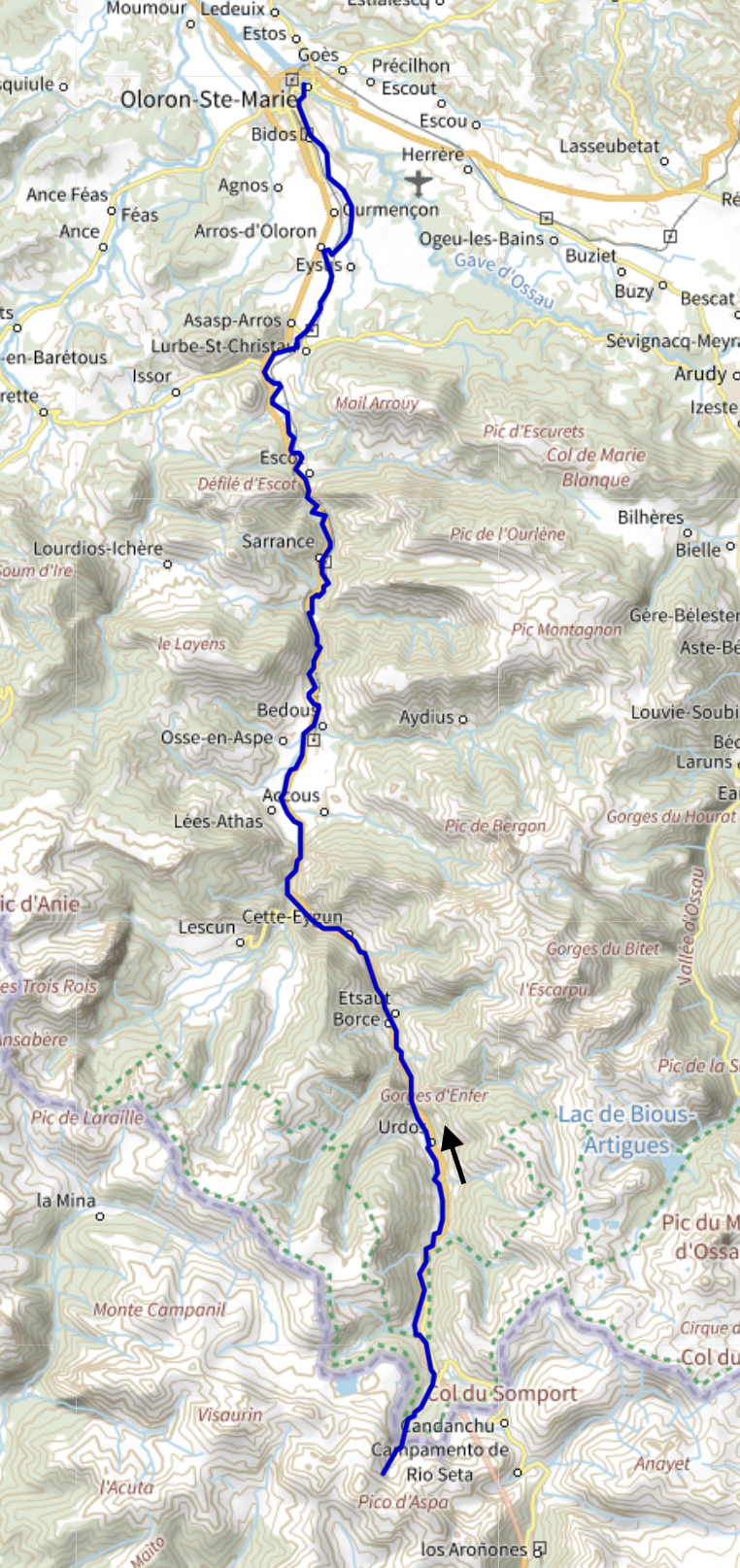

Location
- Country: France

Physical characteristics
- Source
  - location: Pyrenees, Aspe Circus
- Mouth
  - location: Gave d'Oloron
  - coordinates: 43°11′39″N 0°36′29″W
- Length: 58 km (36 mi)

Basin features
- Progression: Gave d'Oloron→ Gaves réunis→ Adour→ Atlantic Ocean

The Gave d'Aspe (French pronunciation: [ɡav dasp]) is a torrential river flowing through the Aspe Valley, one of the three main valleys of the High-Béarn (Pyrénées-Atlantiques), in the southwest of France. It is 58.1 km (36.1 mi) long.

It is formed in the Aspe Cirque, below the Aspe peak, elevation 2,643 metres (8,671 ft), in Spain.

After joining the Gave d'Ossau, in Oloron-Sainte-Marie, it forms the Gave d'Oloron.

== Main tributaries ==
- (R) Arnousse
- (L) Gave de Baralet
- (R) Sescouet
- (L) Gave de Bélonce
- (R) Escuarpe, in Cette-Eygun
- (L) Gave de Lescun
- (R) Berthe, from Accous
- (L) Malugar, from Athas
- (L) Arricq d'Osse
- (R) Gabarret, aka Gave d'Aydius
- (R) Barrescou, from the Marie-Blanque Pass
- (L) Lourdios
- (R) Ourtau

== Départements and towns ==
- Pyrénées-Atlantiques:

- Accous
- Asasp
- Bedous
- Bidos
- Borce
- Cette-Eygun
- Escot
- Etsaut
- Eysus
- Gurmençon
- Asasp-Arros
- Lées-Athas
- Lescun
- Lurbe-Saint-Christau
- Osse-en-Aspe
- Sarrance
- Urdos
