= Camou =

Camou may refer to:

- Geographic names
  - Aïcirits-Camou-Suhast, a commune in the Pyrénées-Atlantiques department in France.
  - Camou-Cihigue, a commune in the Pyrénées-Atlantiques department in France.
- Family names
  - Jacques Camou (1792 – 1868), French general.
  - Richard Camou, French politician (MPF), 2008–2014 mayor of Villeneuve-Loubet, France.
- Other
  - Château Camou, Mexican Vineyard and Winery based in Cañada del Trigo.
  - the short term for Camouflage.
