= Arudy =

- Commune
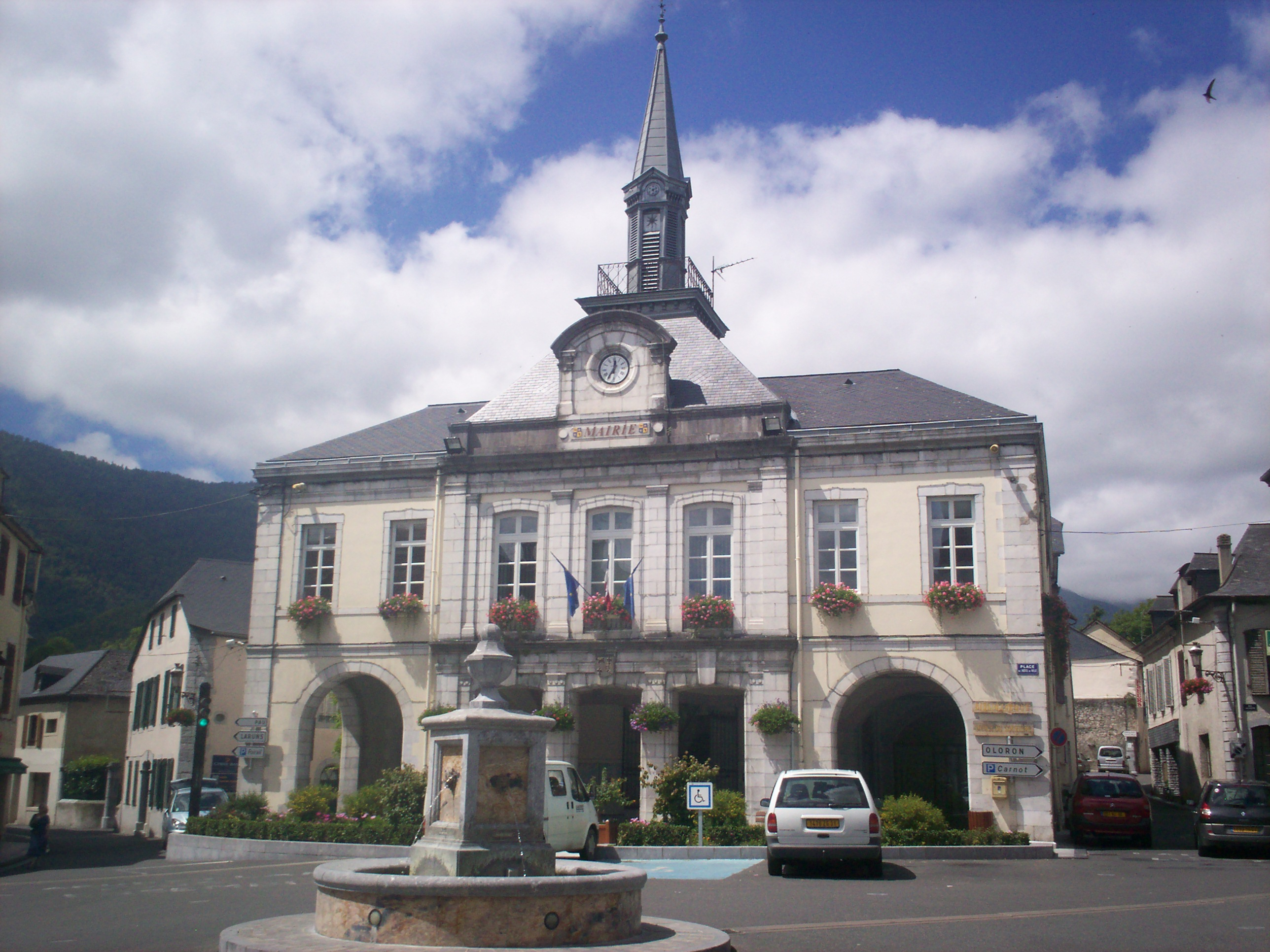
- Town hall

- Coat of arms
- Location of Arudy
- Location within France Location within Nouvelle-Aquitaine
- Coordinates: 43°06′25″N 0°25′37″W
- Country: France
- Region: Nouvelle-Aquitaine
- Department: Pyrénées-Atlantiques
- Arrondissement: Oloron-Sainte-Marie
- Canton: Oloron-Sainte-Marie-2
- Intercommunality: CC Vallée Ossau

Government
  - Mayor (2020–2026): Claude Aussant
- Area^{1}: 28.23 km^{2} (10.90 sq mi)
- Elevation: 400 m (1,300 ft)
- Highest elevation: 1,446 m (4,744 ft)
- Lowest elevation: 310 m (1,020 ft)
- Population (2023): 2,228
  - Density: 78.92/km^{2} (204.4/sq mi)
- Time zone: UTC+01:00 (CET)
  - Summer (DST): UTC+02:00 (CEST)
- INSEE/Postal code: 64062 /64260
- ^{1} French Land Register data, which excludes lakes, ponds, glaciers > 1 km^{2} (0.386 sq mi or 247 acres) and river estuaries.

Arudy (French pronunciation: [aʁydi]; Gascon: Arudi) is a commune in the Pyrénées-Atlantiques department in the Nouvelle-Aquitaine region of south-western France.

The commune has been awarded one flower by the National Council of Towns and Villages in Bloom in the Competition of cities and villages in Bloom.

== Geography ==
Arudy is located in the Ossau Valley on a bend on the Gave d'Ossau some 20 km south-east of Oloron-Sainte-Marie and 16 km south of Gan. Access to the commune is by the D920 road from Buzy in the north passing through the commune just west of the town and continuing to Louvie-Juzon in the south. Access to the town is by the D53 connecting to the D920. The D287 also goes east from the town to join the D934 going north to Sévignacq-Meyracq. The D918 branches west from the D920 near the town and continues west through the north of the commune to Lurbe-Saint-Christau.

The SNCF railway line from Buzy-en-Béarn - Laruns which passed through the commune was closed to traffic for passengers on 2 March 1969. A bus connection remained in place until 1 September 2009. Freight traffic between Buzy-en-Béarn and Arudy survived until 2003. The facilities have now been dismantled.

The western hills of the commune are heavily forested with farmland in the valleys. The east of the commune in the Ossau Valley is mainly residential with some farmland.

=== Hydrography ===
Located in the Drainage basin of the Adour, the Gave d'Ossau forms the eastern border as it curves around the town and continues west, forming the northern border of the commune, to join the Gave d'Aspe to form the Gave d'Oloron at Oloron-Sainte-Marie. Many tributaries rise in the south of the commune and flow north to join the Gave d'Ossau including the Lamisou, the Arrec de Baycabe, the Ruisseau du Bois de Nougué, the Arrec de Lacerbelle, and the Ruisseau du Termy which forms the western border of the commune.

=== Places and Hamlets ===
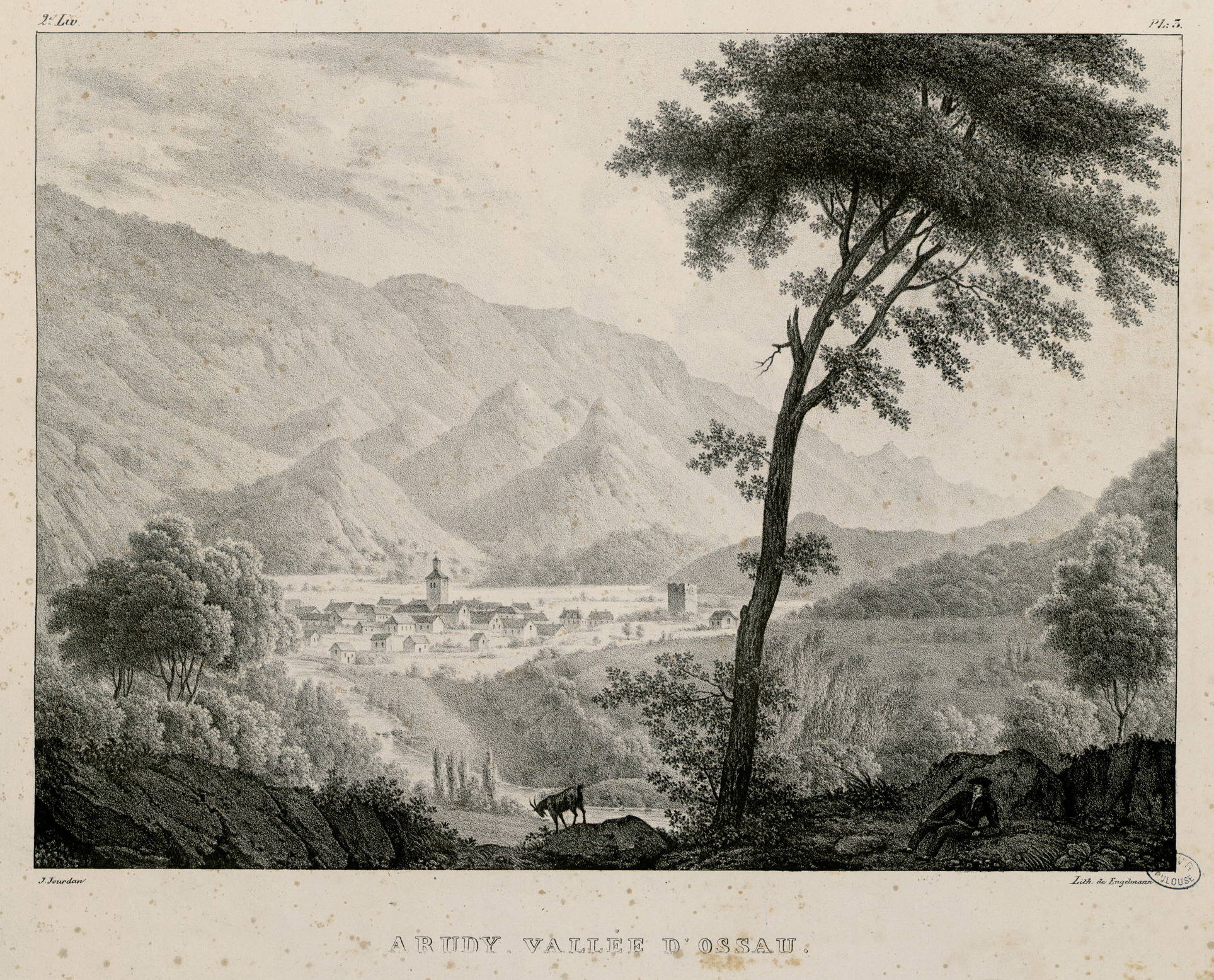
Arudy in 1829

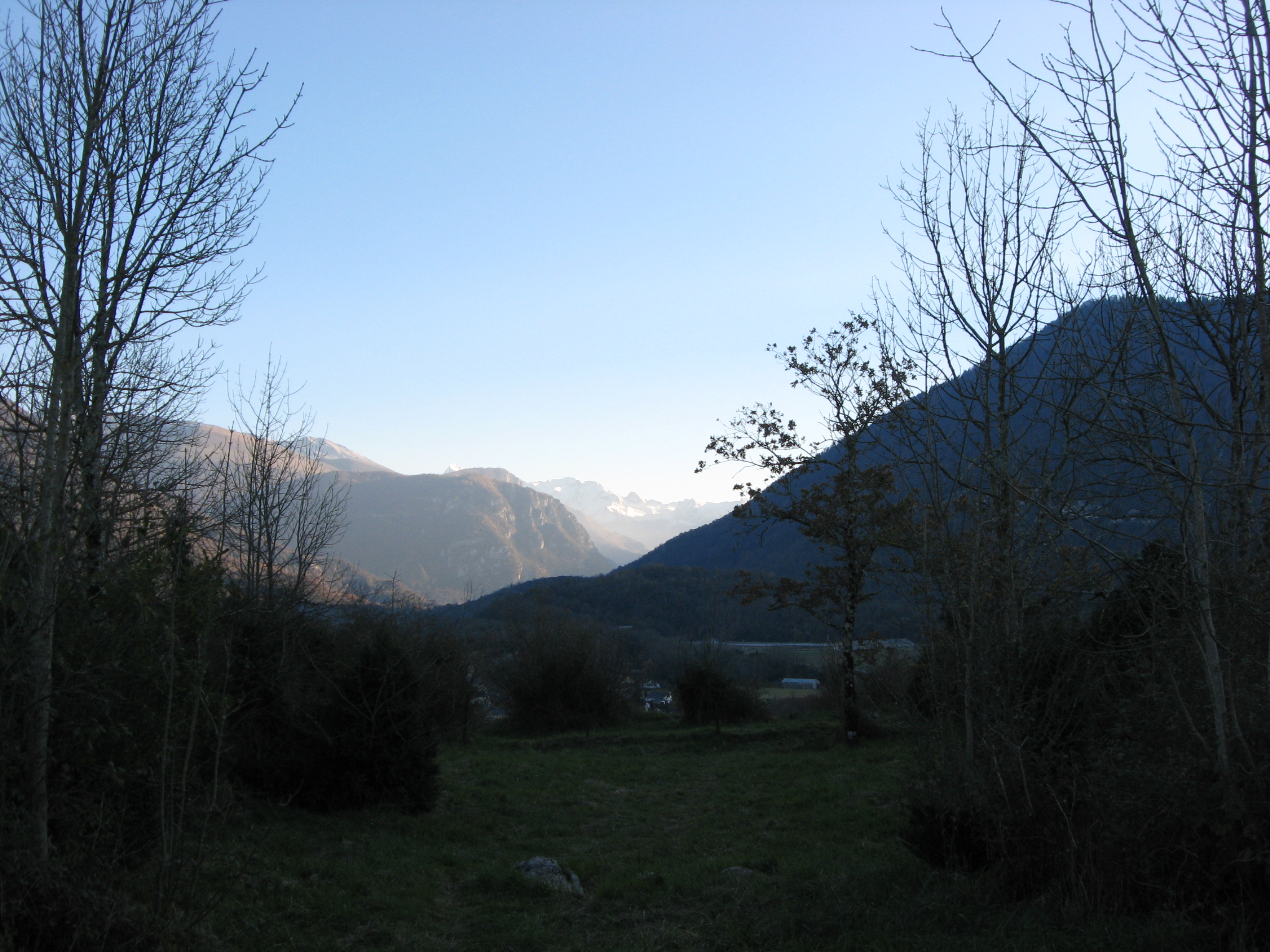
The Ossau Valley

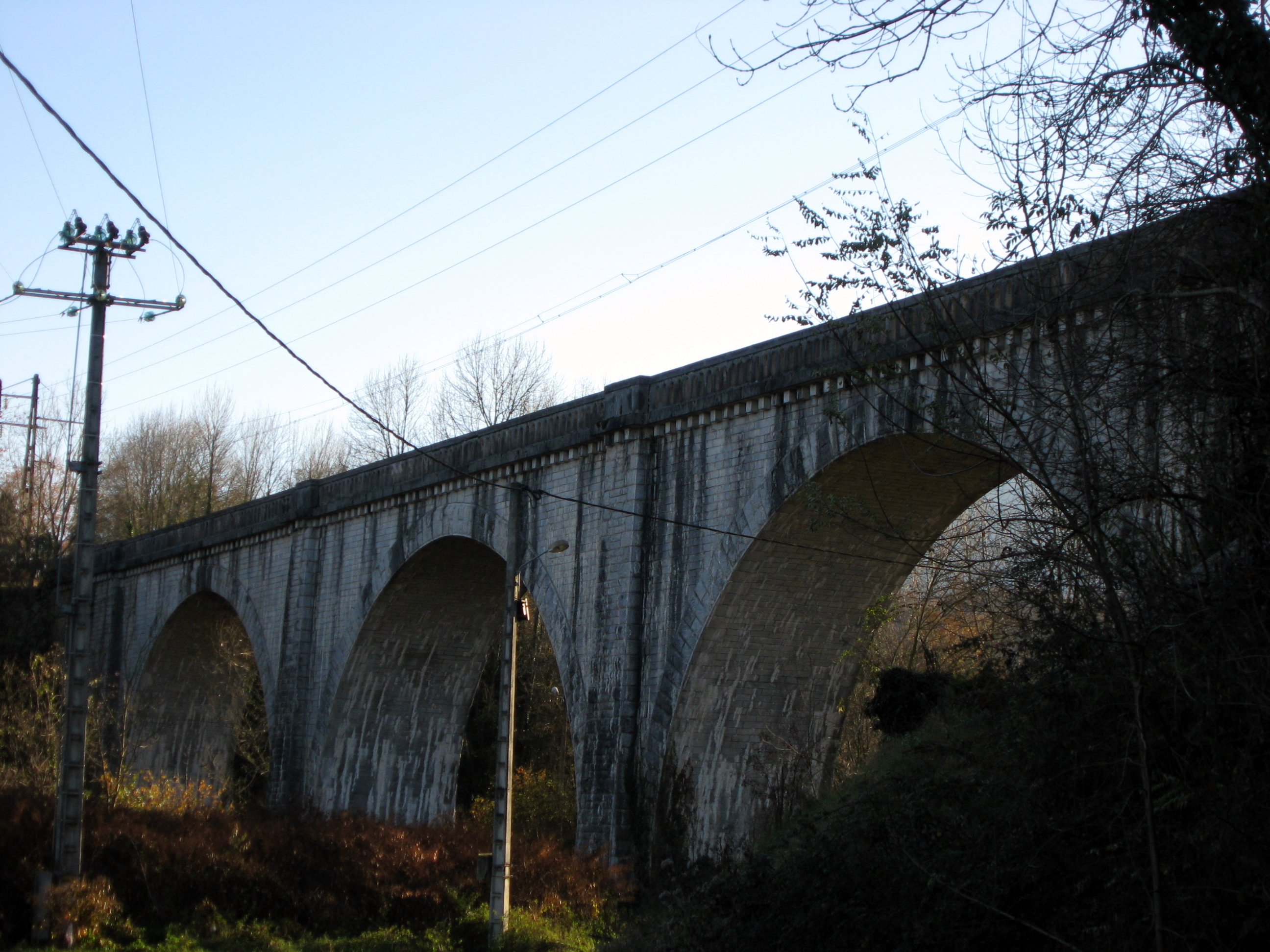
Old railway viaduct in Arudy

- L'Abat (Drinking trough)
- L'Abétat (Col de)
- Anglès
- Angous
- Arrabiot
- Arrouge (ruins)
- L'Aubisqué
- Bareilles
- Barguères
- Bélier
- Bérastou
- Bersaut (Ravine)
- Béteilles
- Blingou (Turoun - 433 metres)
- Bordedela (spring)
- Bourdeu
- Brousset
- Caillabère
- Caillou-Marrau
- Camanère
- Carrey
- Casajus
- Cabanes de Castillou
- Cazassus
- Cortès-Granges
- Crest (Lake)
- Cumarty
- Daré Bourdeu
- Etchaux
- Florence
- Garrail
- Cabane de Garrietche
- Gerbadure (Col de - 1198 metres)
- Goubert
- Habarra
- Heugacète (Col de)
- Hondaa
- Houn Barrade (Col de)
- Hourgolle
- Les Jardins d'Arudy
- Jugist
- Laborde (two places)
- Lacoste
- Lacrabère
- Ladebeze
- Granges Lafont
- Lanne
- Larroun
- Lascoungues
- Laüs
- Lissert
- Louraou (Drinking trough)
- Loustau
- Pouey Maou
- Malarode
- Manaut
- Mancesta (Ravine)
- Martouré
- Maysonnave
- Médalou
- Miégaville
- Mourlane
- Cité Notre-Dame
- Nougué
- L'Oustalot
- Pédestarrès (ruins)
- Pène de Plou (468 metres)
- Le Pic d'Ossau
- Pierris
- Pouts
- Saint-Cricq
- Saubiron
- Sépé (Spring)
- Séré
- Soubirou
- Soumabielles (ruins)
- Terranère
- Tilhou
- Tocortoure
- Trois-Auges (Fountain)
- Le Turon (530 mètres)
- Vignau
- Le Zoum

== Toponymy ==
The commune name in béarnais is Arudi.

According to Michel Grosclaude the name comes from the basque harr ("stone" or "rock") and uri ("town").

The following table details the origins of the commune name and other names in the commune.

Name	Spelling	Date	Source	Page	Origin	Description
Arudy	Eruri	1270	Raymond	14	Ossau	Village
	Aruri	1286	Grosclaude		Arudy/Iseste spoiled deed	
	Aruri	1328	Grosclaude		Ossau-Val Treaty of Tena	
	Aruri	1343	Raymond	14	Pardies	
	Arury	1368	Grosclaude		Chéronnet	
	Arudy	1375	Raymond	14	Luntz	
	Aruri	1386	Grosclaude		Chéronnet	
	Aruri	1399	Grosclaude		Manumission of Serfdom	
	Aruri	1442	Grosclaude		Chéronnet	
	Aruri	1466	Grosclaude		Chéronnet	
	Aruri	1486	Grosclaude		Chéronnet	
	Erudi	1487	Raymond	14	Ossau	
	Arudi	1538	Raymond	14	Reformation	
	Saint-Germain d'Arudy	1607	Raymond	14	Insinuations	
	Arudy	1750	Cassini			
Anglas	Anglès	1538	Raymond	6	Reformation	Fief, vassal of the Viscounts of Béarn
	Anglès	1863	Raymond	6		
Baget	Baget	1863	Raymond	19		Hamlet
Bareilles	Barelhes	1385	Raymond	21	Census	Farm
Caillabère	la Caillabère	1863	Raymond	39		Mountain
Castet	Castet	1096	Raymond	45	Marca	Castet had a Lay Abbey, vassal of the Viscounts of Béarn. In 1385 it depended on the bailiwick of Ossau and had 45 fires. Castet took its name from the Chateau of Castetgelos which was built in its territory.
	Castellum	1154	Raymond	45	Marca	
	Casteg	1385	Raymond	45	Census	
	Sent Policarpe de Casteig	1621	Raymond	45	Insinuations	
Caubios	Caubios	1538	Raymond	47	Reformation	Fief, vassal of the Viscounts of Béarn
Col de Houn-Barrade	Le Col de la Houn-Barade	1863	Raymond	79		Mountain pass between Arudy and Izeste
Lanne	Lane	1385	Raymond	92	Census	Farm
Martouré	Martouré	1675	Raymond	109	Reformation	Hillock where the old Château of Arudy stood and where the fires for the Festival of Saint-Jean were lit
Mur	Meur	1675	Raymond	120	Reformation	A Group of rocks which were the destination for processions and another place where fires for the Festival of Saint-Jean were lit.
Pouts	Potz	1385	Raymond	139	Census	Farm
Sacase de Siot	Sciot	1675	Raymond	145	Reformation	Fief, vassal of the Viscounts of Béarn

Sources:

- Raymond: Topographic Dictionary of the Department of Basses-Pyrenees, 1863, on the page numbers indicated in the table. (in French)
- Grosclaude: Toponymic Dictionary of communes, Béarn, 2006 (in French)
- Cassini: Cassini Map from 1750

Origins:

- Ossau: Titles of the Ossau Valley
- Pardies: Notaries of Pardies (Monein)
- Chéronnet: Bernard Chéronnet
- Luntz: Contracts retained by Luntz
- Reformation: Reformation of Béarn
- Insinuations: Insinuations of the Diocese of Oloron
- Census: Census of Béarn
- Marca: Pierre de Marca, History of Béarn.

== History ==
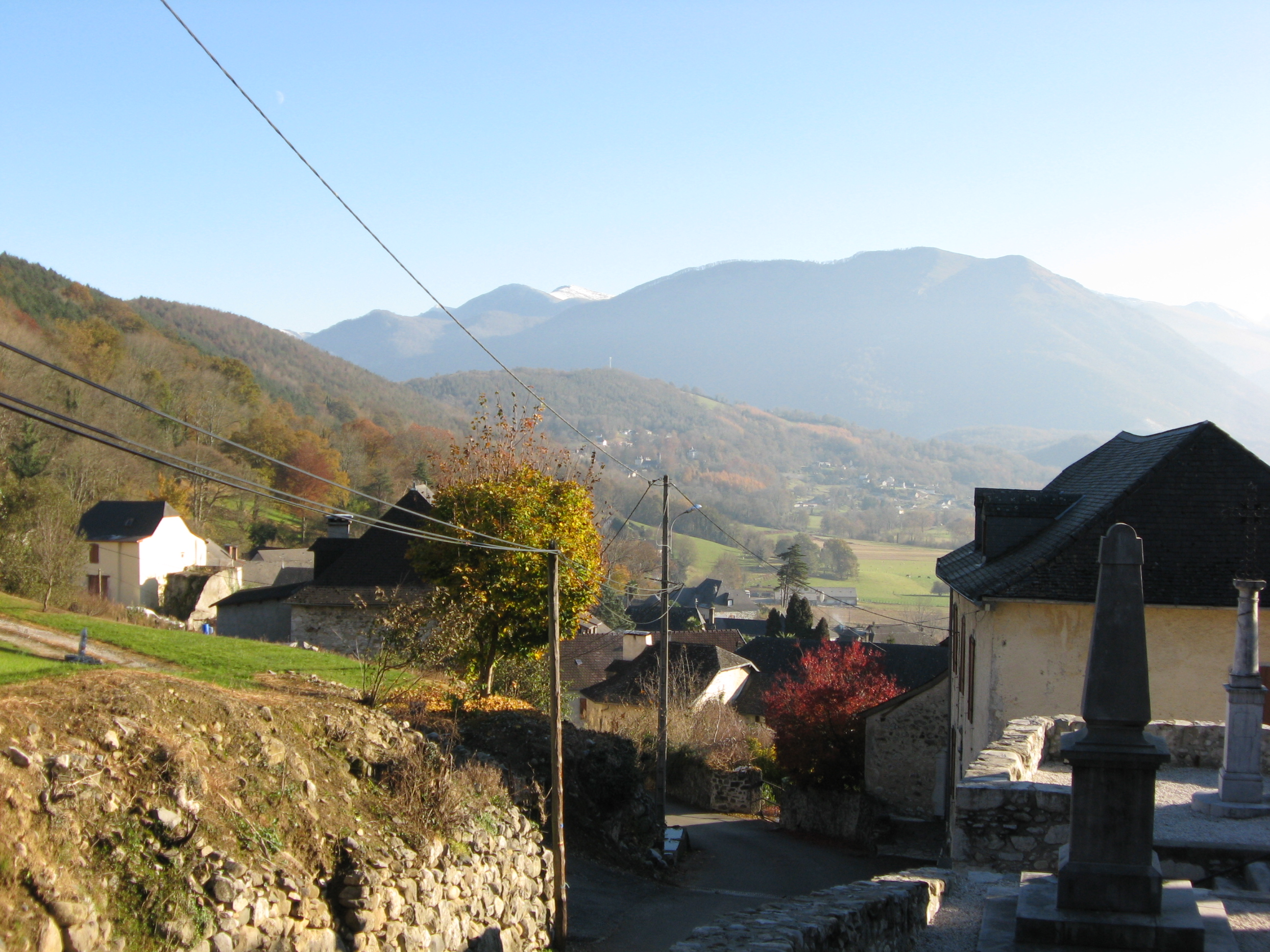
View of Arudy from Bescat

The first traces of civilisation in the commune date to Prehistory or more precisely to the Magdalenian period. Excavations in four caves in the commune (Maladore, Poeymaü, Saint-Michel, and Espalungue) uncovered bones, tools, and many snail shells.

The village of Eruri or Aruri was mentioned at the beginning of the 13th century. It was from the beginning of that time that the Ossau Union was created which permitted relative independence for the communes in the valley until the French Revolution.

Paul Raymond noted on page 14 of his 1863 dictionary that the commune had a Lay Abbey, vassal of the Viscounts of Béarn, with 86 fires and depended on the bailiwick of Ossau.

It was in the 19th century that economic growth started in the commune. Sawmills and Marble quarries were created which provided a living to several hundred people. One quarry still operates today.

On 29 February 1980 Arudy was the epicentre of an earthquake measuring 5.2 on the Richter scale and 7.5 on the MSK scale which damaged many buildings in the town. The college had to be rebuilt.

=== Heraldry ===
Arms of Arudy	Blazon: Azure, a castle Argent of 3 towers turreted, masoned in sable and surmounted by a cow of Or horned.

== Administration ==
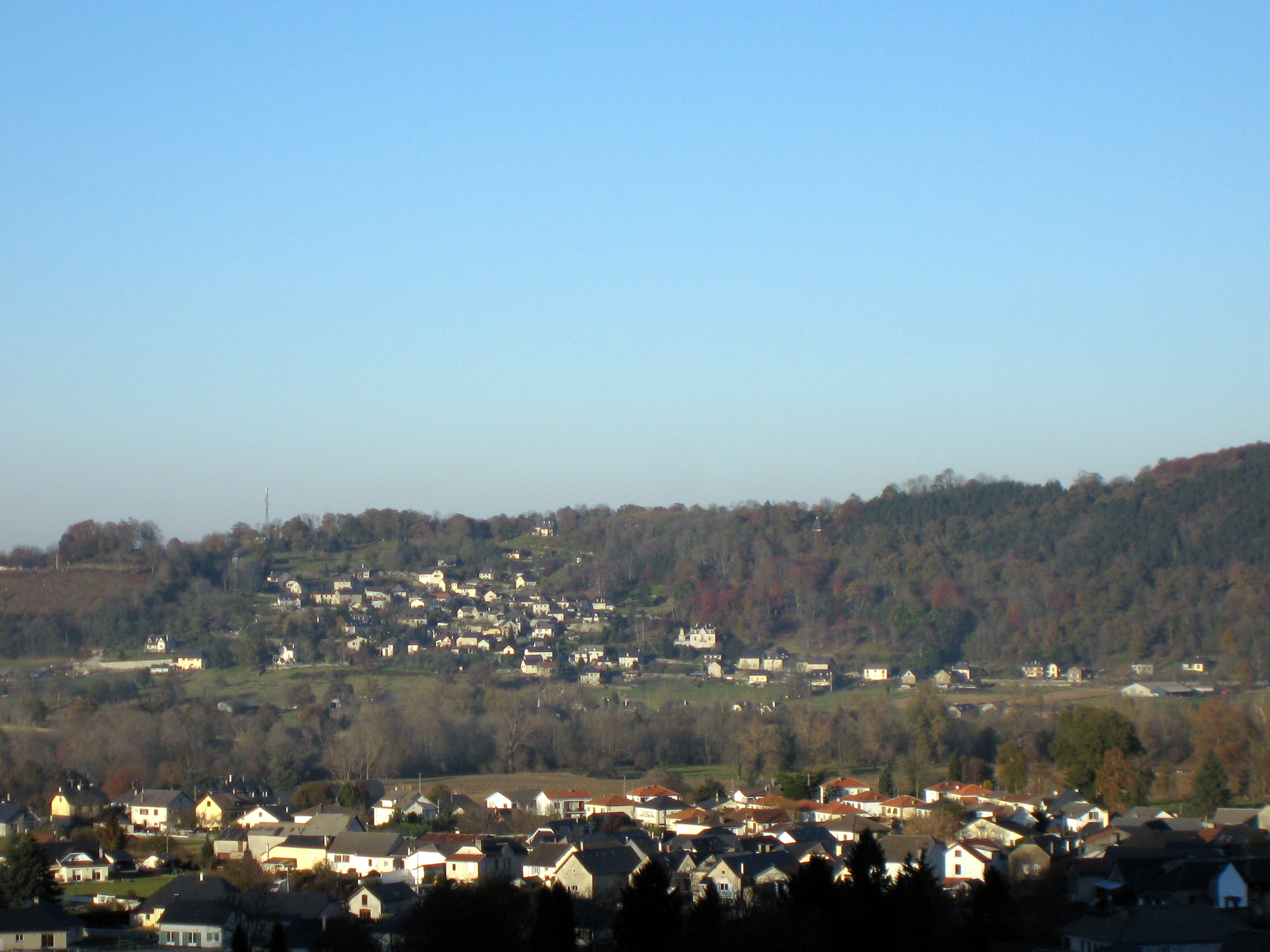
View towards Bescat from the Saint-Michel hill in Arudy

List of Successive Mayors

From	To	Name	Party
1995	2014	Gérard Cambot	
2014	2026	Claude Aussant	DVG

=== Inter-communality ===
The commune is part of six inter-communal structures:

- the Communauté de communes de la Vallée d'Ossau;
- the local public management agency;
- the association for the perception of Arudy;
- the water association for the Ossau Valley;
- the electrification association for Bas-Ossau;
- the SIVU for sanitation for the Ossau Valley;

== Demography ==
The inhabitants of the commune are known as Arudyens or Arudyennes in French.

Historical population

Year	Pop.	±% p.a.
1793	1,767	—
1800	1,635	−1.10%
1806	1,745	+1.09%
1821	1,774	+0.11%
1831	1,863	+0.49%
1836	1,745	−1.30%
1841	1,971	+2.47%
1846	1,973	+0.02%
1851	2,026	+0.53%
1856	1,878	−1.51%
1861	1,930	+0.55%
1866	1,995	+0.66%
1872	1,978	−0.14%
1876	1,801	−2.32%
1881	2,027	+2.39%
1886	1,843	−1.89%
1891	1,816	−0.29%
1896	1,731	−0.95%
1901	1,710	−0.24%

Year	Pop.	±% p.a.
1906	1,868	+1.78%
1911	1,897	+0.31%
1921	1,723	−0.96%
1926	1,786	+0.72%
1931	2,032	+2.61%
1936	1,930	−1.02%
1946	2,130	+0.99%
1954	2,112	−0.11%
1962	2,444	+1.84%
1968	2,874	+2.74%
1975	2,892	+0.09%
1982	2,705	−0.95%
1990	2,537	−0.80%
1999	2,234	−1.40%
2007	2,248	+0.08%
2012	2,185	−0.57%
2017	2,229	+0.40%
2023	2,228	−0.01%

Source: EHESS and INSEE

== Economy ==
Arudy has diverse economic activities:

- the commune has a large sheep breeding centre and strong activity related to hunting. Arudy forms part of the Appellation d'origine contrôlée (AOC) zone designation of Ossau-iraty;
- the commune conserves and operates marble (gray-black) and limestone quarry sites. The Church of St. Severus in Assat, for example, was built in 1873 with Arudy limestone;
- There are wood and marble working industries;
- the Messier industrial foundry, a subsidiary of Ventana Aerospace Group, employs approximately 200 people. The foundry produces alloys of magnesium-thorium intended for the aviation industry. The machining of these materials has resulted in the production of waste containing thorium. 13.3 tonnes of the residue of thorium-magnesium alloys (Grime from the foundry, shavings from machining, miscellaneous scrap, etc.) are stored in a special location with a radioactivity of 1.9 GBq from thorium-232. The company faces economic difficulties and has been placed in a Judicial Recovery procedure by the Commercial Court on the 1 April 2010. The Commercial Court of Pau approved exit from the Judicial recovery safeguard procedure proposed by management and the court administrators of the Messier foundry in July 2011. Messier Foundry is a prime contractor in the CARAIBE collaborative project approved by the Aerospace Valley Pôle de compétitivité group and funded by the Fonds unique interministériel (Single inter-ministerial funds) programme.

== Culture and heritage ==
=== Civil heritage ===
The Hôtel Pouts (17th century) is registered as an historical monument. It is an ancient Lay Abbey which later became a police station. The building was renovated in 1971 to house a museum: the Maison d'Ossau.

The Maison d'Ossau museum in the Hôtel Pouts displays regional archaeological collections, specimens of flora and fauna of the Pyrenees, and local costumes.

Arudy has 16th and 17th century houses, a bridge said to be Roman, and Lavoirs (public laundries) from the 19th century.

=== Religious heritage ===
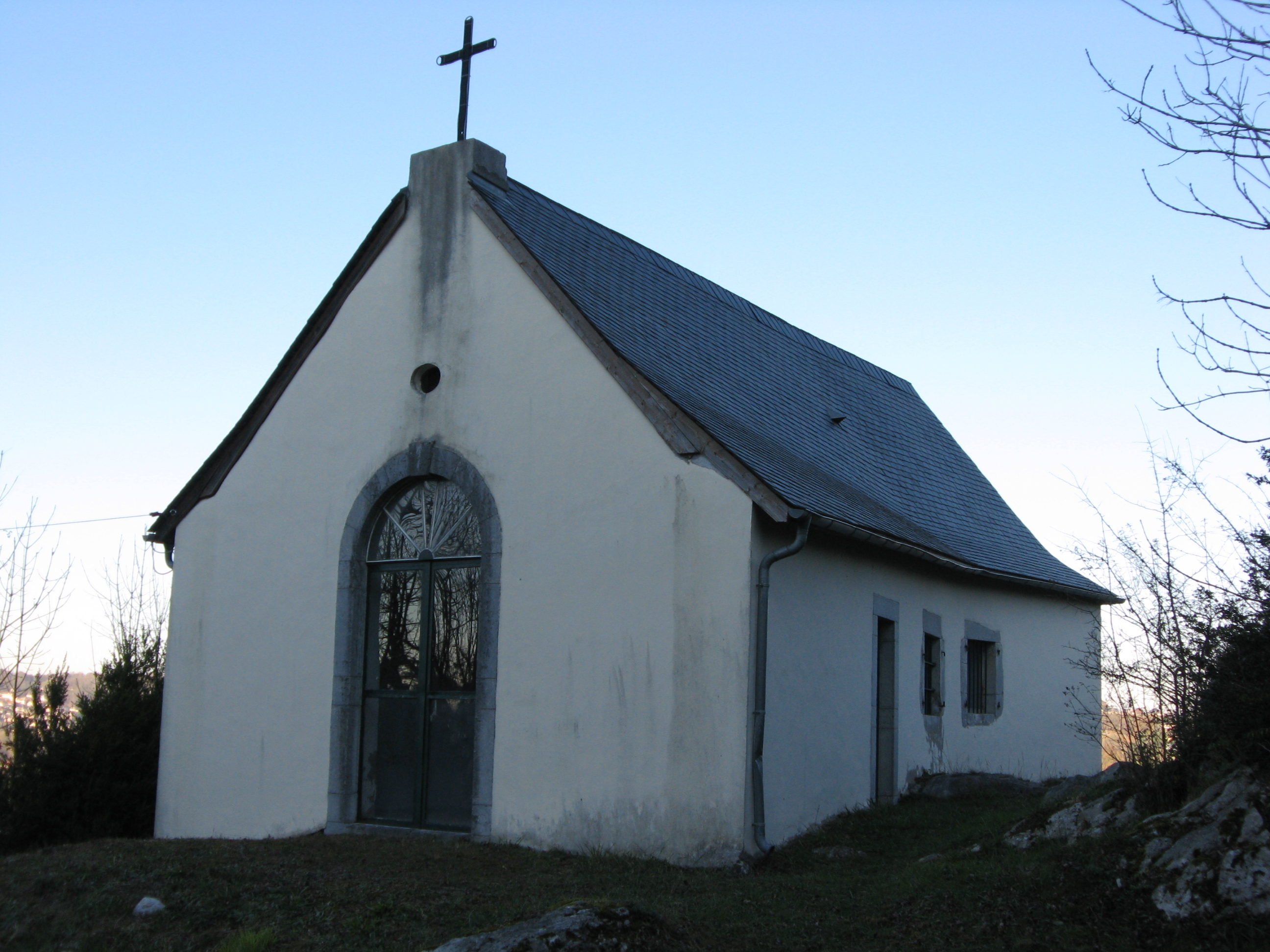
Chapel dedicated to the Archangel Saint Michel

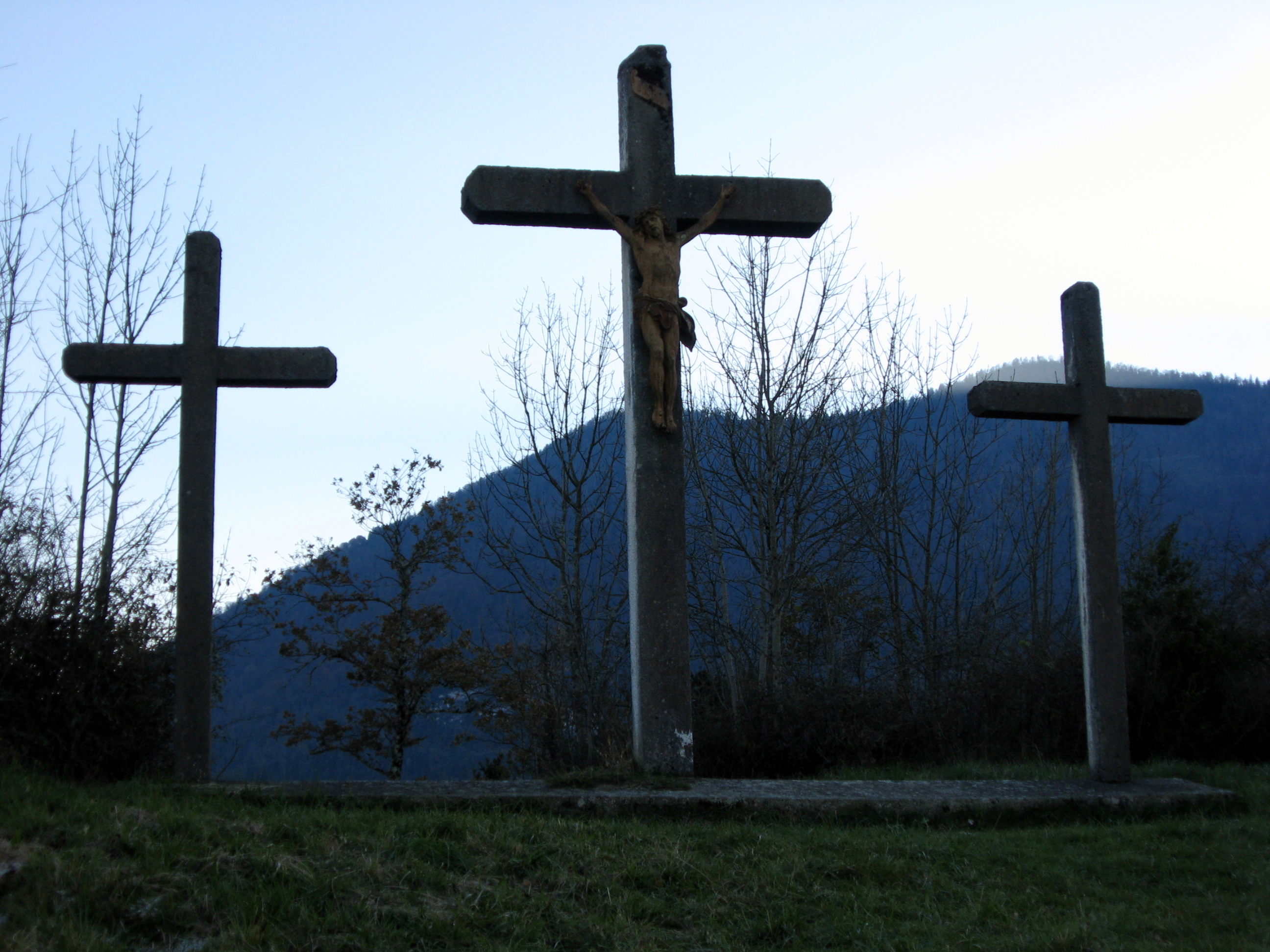
Cross dedicated to the Archangel Saint Michel

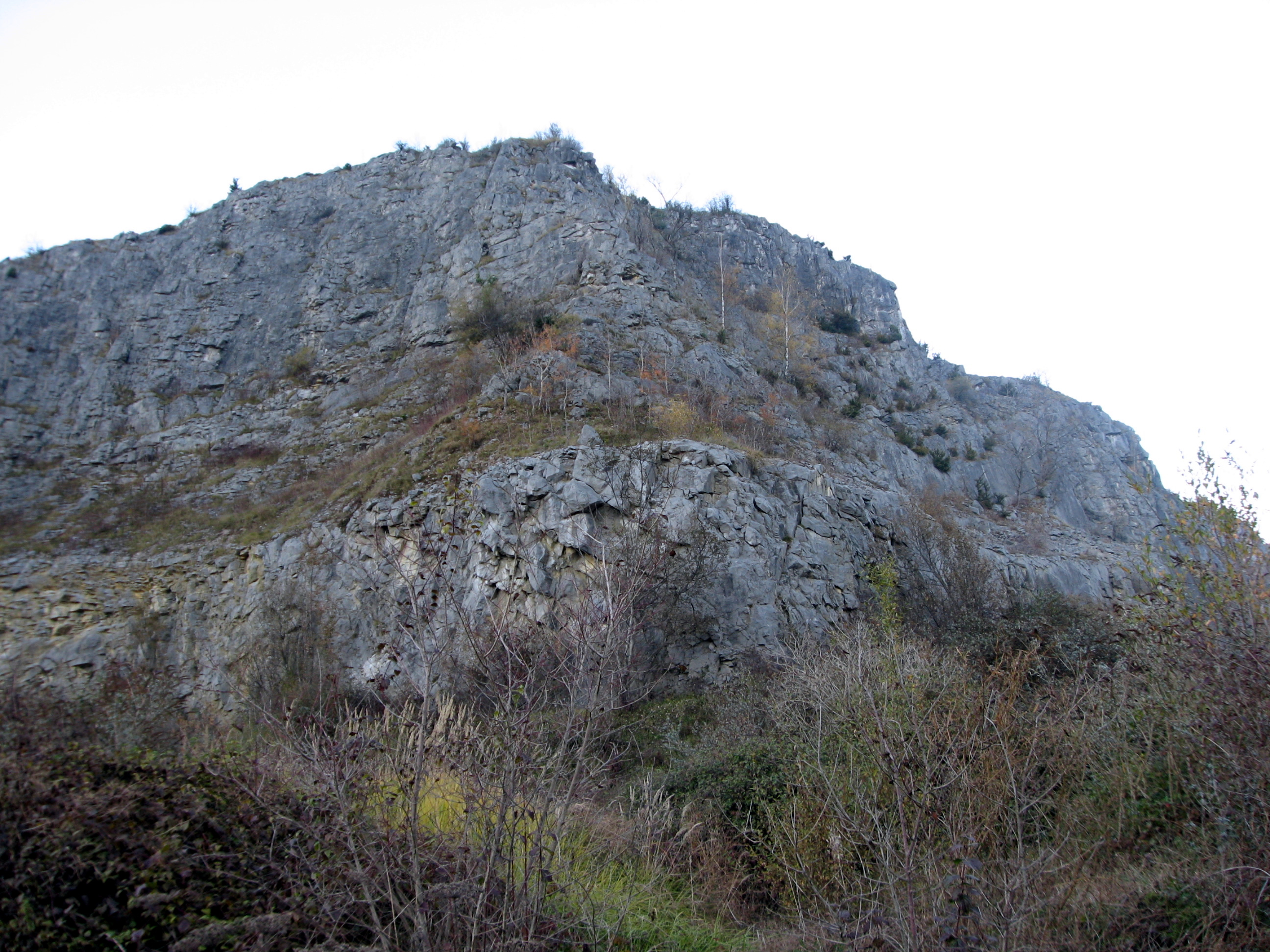
Cliff above the Chapel Saint-Michel

The Church of Saint-Germain (12th century, renovated in the 19th century) contains several items classified as historical objects:

- A Statue: Saint Germain (17th century)
- A Painting: Saint Germain the Auxerrois at prayer (17th century)
- A Retable on the main altar (17th century)
- A Processional cross: Saint Lucie (18th century)
- A Paschal Candlestick (17th century)

The interior of the chapel of Saint-Michel is decorated with paintings by Pierre Martinez.

=== Environmental heritage ===
The Abétat peaks at 1204 metres, the Gerbadure at 1254m, the Soum Counée at 1361m, the Bersaut at 1368m, the Hourquettes de Baygrand at 1386m, the Senzouens (or the Breque) at 1392m, and the Pic d'Escurets at 1440m.

== Amenities ==
=== Education ===
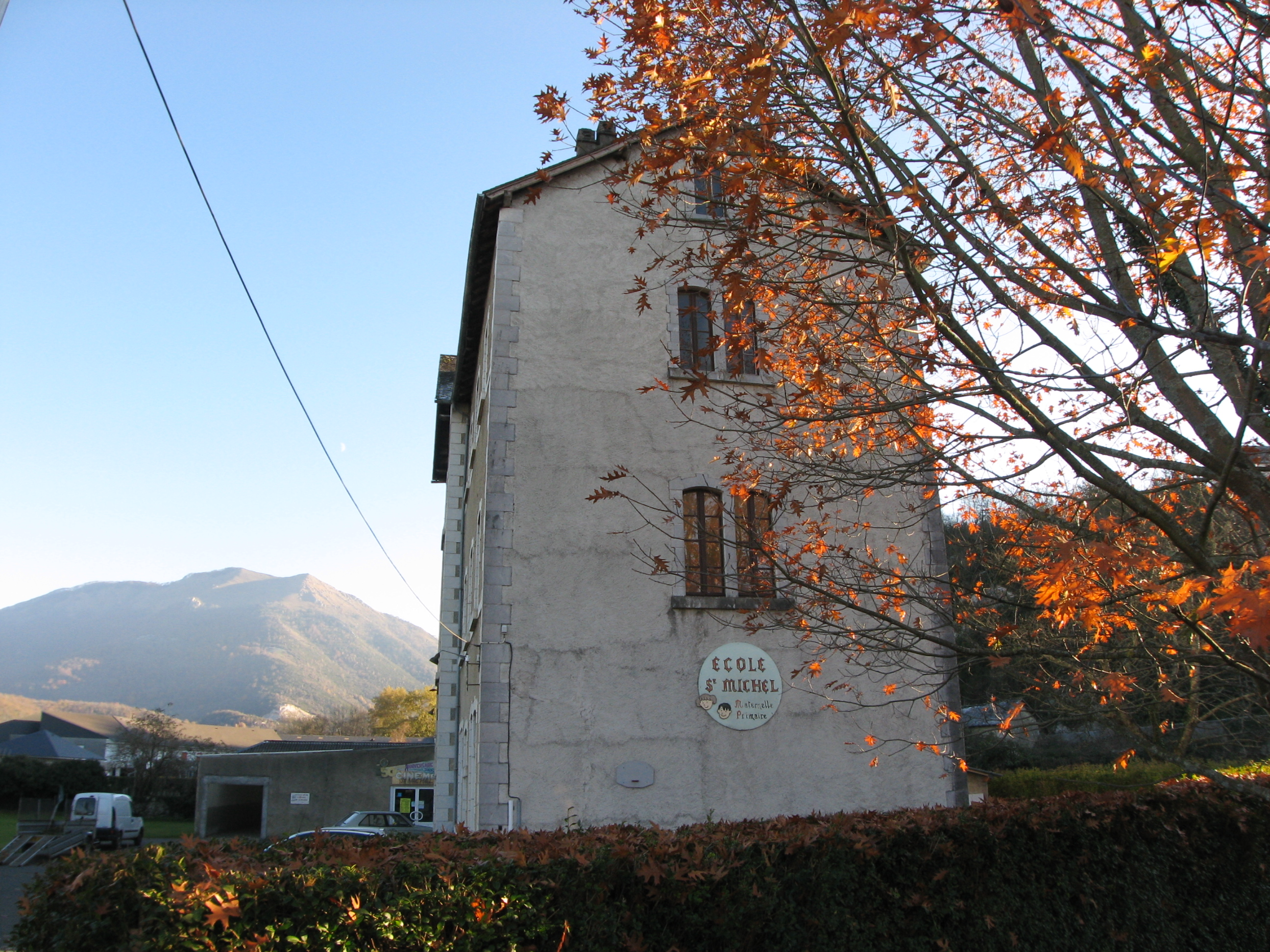
The old primary school

The town has a public college, and one primary school. Another private primary school has been closed since the beginning of September 2011.

=== Sports and sports facilities ===
- ES Arudy is a Rugby club which plays in Fédérale 3;
- TCO tennis club provides coaching by a qualified instructor. They have three tennis courts: one clay court and two fast courts;
- The Arudy rock-climbing school is one of the busiest in the region. It consists of three main areas with over a hundred climbing routes fitted out.

== Notable people linked to the commune ==
- Jean Darriule, born on 16 November 1774 at Arudy, was a French Lieutenant-General. His name features on the Arc de Triomphe in Paris.
- Georges Penabert, born on 23 April 1825 at Arudy
- Édouard Piette, born in 1827, directed the Upper Paleolithic excavation site in Arudy.
- Jean-Baptiste Dortignacq, born on 25 April 1884 at Arudy, he was a road racing cyclist.
- Robert Barran, born on 13 January 1918 at Arudy, he was a Rugby league and Rugby union player.
- Georges Laplace, French anthropologist, born in 1918 and died in 2004 at Pau, in 1970 he founded the centre for stratigraphic Paleo-ethnology at Arudy.

== Bibliography ==
- René Arripe, Ossau 1900: The Canton of Arudy, Loubatières, Toulouse, 1990 (in French)
- René Arripe, Ossau Valley 2000: The Canton of Arudy, R. Arripe, 2004, 782 pages

== See also ==
- Ossau Valley
- Communes of the Pyrénées-Atlantiques department
- Route nationale 618
- Col d'Aubisque
