= Jacques Camou =

French general (1792–1868)

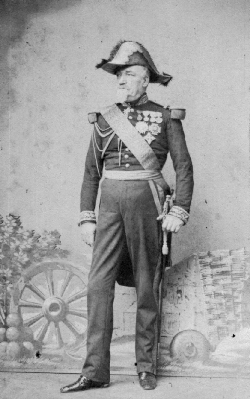
- Jacques Camou in 1857 as commander of the 2nd infantry division of the Imperial Guard.
- Born: 1 May 1792; Sarrance
- Died: 8 February 1868 (aged 75)
- Military career
- Allegiance: France
- Branch: Army
- Rank: Major general
- Commands: 2nd Infantry Division
- Conflicts: Peninsular War; French expedition to Spain; Crimean War; Siege of Sevastopol; Battle of Chernaya River; Second Italian War of Independence
- Awards: Légion d'honneur
- Other work: Senator

Jacques Camou (1 May 1792 – 8 February 1868) was a French general in the armies of Emperor Napoleon III.

== Biography ==
Born at Sarrance in the département Pyrénées-Atlantiques, Camou began his military career on 6 September 1808, as a sergeant in the mountain infantry. With the troops of Napoleon I, he served in the Peninsular War and in Italy.

His military career was interrupted when the French armies were dissolved in 1815, but in 1817, he served again as a lieutenant. He participated in 1823 in the French expedition to Spain.

In 1830 he was sent to Algeria, where he would rise to the rank of brigadier general in 1848. Four years later, he was promoted to the rank of major general and made commander of the division of Algiers.

Subsequently, Camou commanded the 2nd Infantry Division of the Imperial Guard in the Crimean War—where he participated in the Siege of Sevastopol and in the Battle of Chernaya River in 1855—and in the Second Italian War of Independence in 1859.

In 1857, he was awarded the Grand cordon of the Légion d'honneur, and on 30 December 1863, he was made a senator.

== Legacy ==
In Paris, the rue du Général Camou is named in honour of Jacques Camou. Until 1967, the street was called just rue Camou.
