= Issor =

- Commune
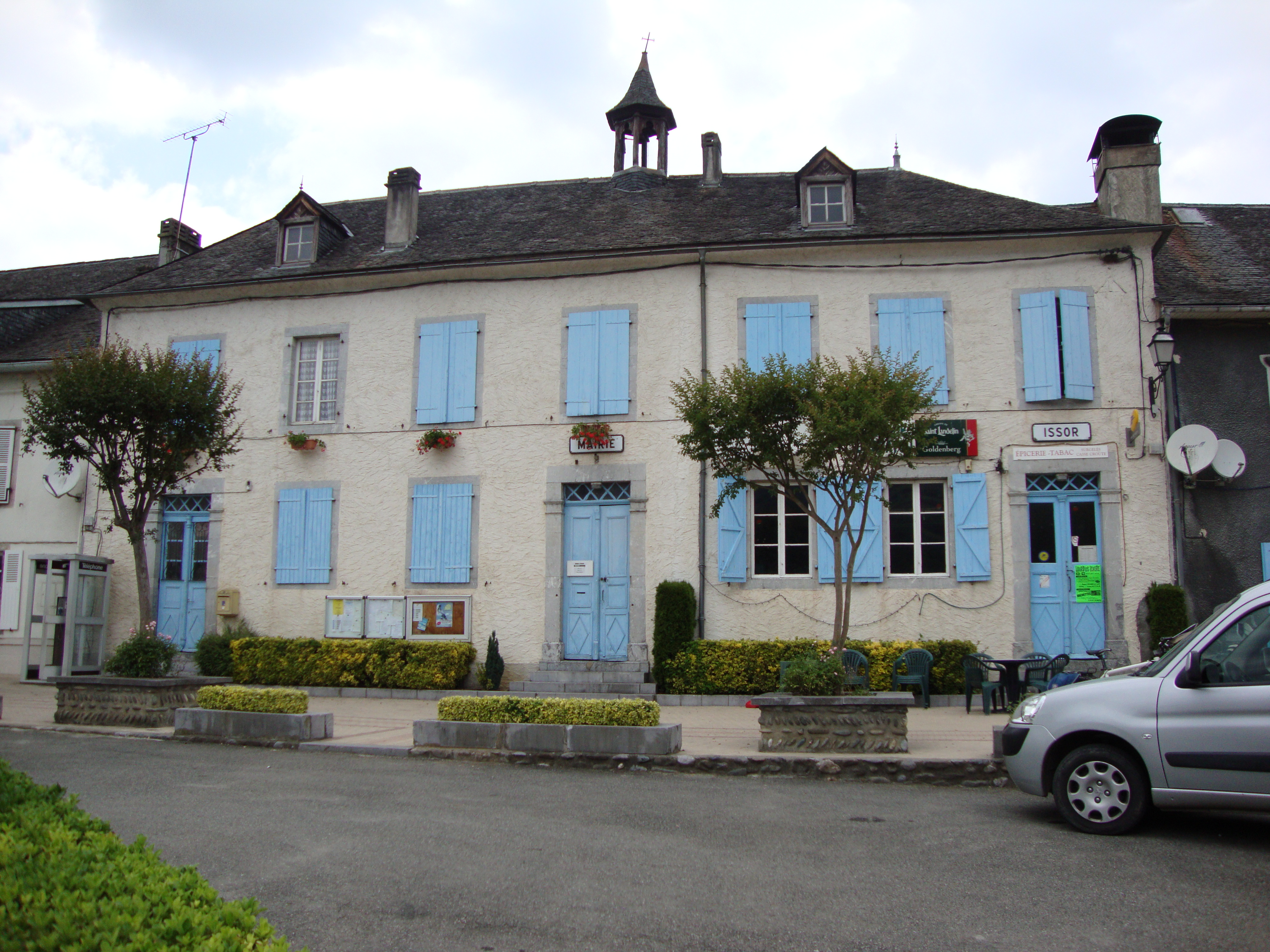
- Town Hall
- Location of Issor
- Location within France Location within Nouvelle-Aquitaine
- Coordinates: 43°06′08″N 0°39′38″W
- Country: France
- Region: Nouvelle-Aquitaine
- Department: Pyrénées-Atlantiques
- Arrondissement: Oloron-Sainte-Marie
- Canton: Oloron-Sainte-Marie-1
- Intercommunality: Haut Béarn

Government
  - Mayor (2020–2026): Cédric Pucheu
- Area^{1}: 23.00 km^{2} (8.88 sq mi)
- Highest elevation: 1,206 m (3,957 ft)
- Lowest elevation: 280 m (920 ft)
- Population (2023): 256
  - Density: 11.1/km^{2} (28.8/sq mi)
- Time zone: UTC+01:00 (CET)
  - Summer (DST): UTC+02:00 (CEST)
- INSEE/Postal code: 64276 /64570
- ^{1} French Land Register data, which excludes lakes, ponds, glaciers > 1 km^{2} (0.386 sq mi or 247 acres) and river estuaries.

Issor (French pronunciation: [isɔʁ]; Béarnese: Issòr) is a commune in the Pyrénées-Atlantiques department in south-western France.

== See also ==
- Communes of the Pyrénées-Atlantiques department
