= Gurmençon =

- Commune
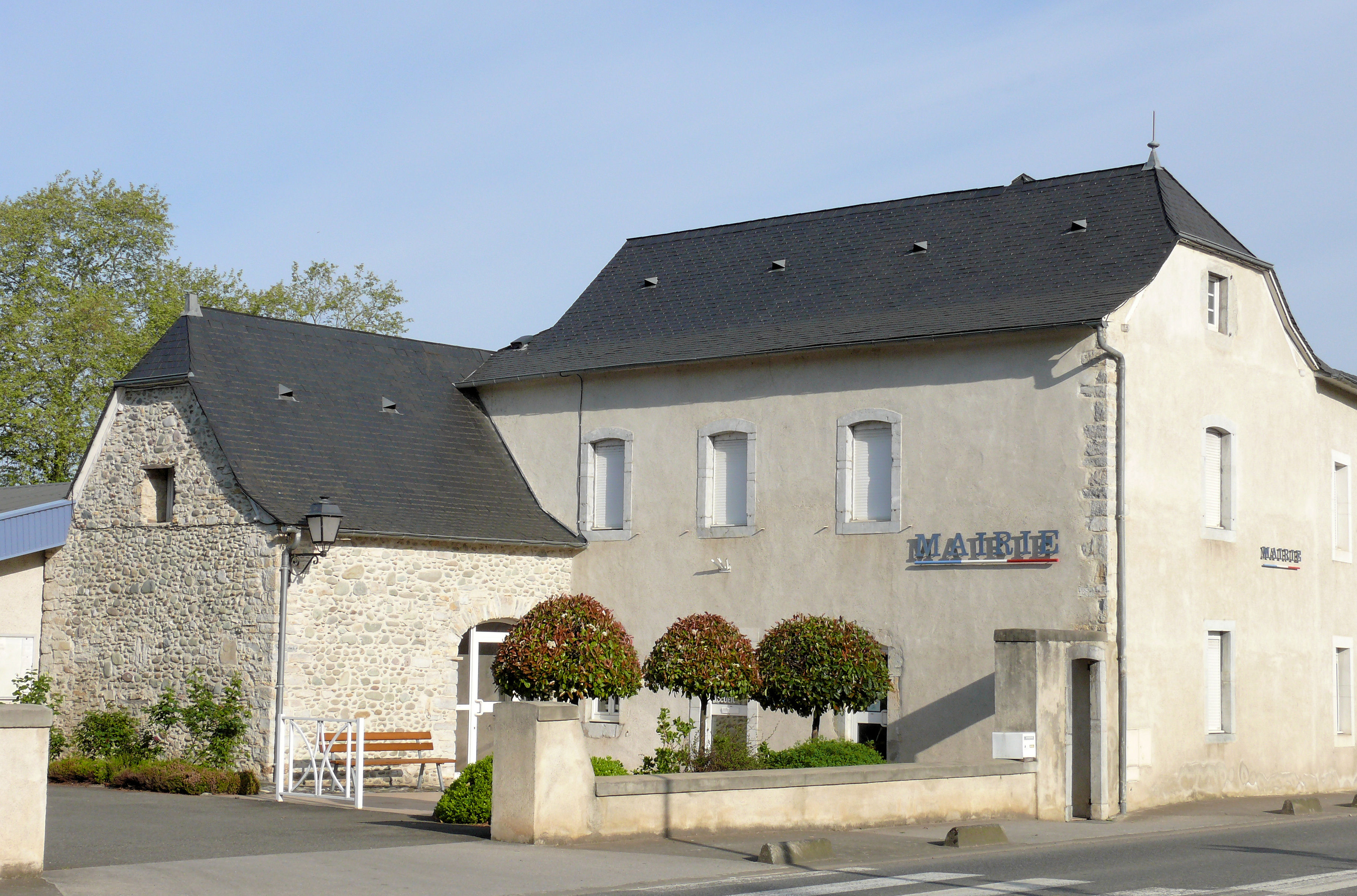
- The town hall of Gurmençon
- Location of Gurmençon
- Location within France Location within Nouvelle-Aquitaine
- Coordinates: 43°09′25″N 0°35′41″W
- Country: France
- Region: Nouvelle-Aquitaine
- Department: Pyrénées-Atlantiques
- Arrondissement: Oloron-Sainte-Marie
- Canton: Oloron-Sainte-Marie-1
- Intercommunality: Haut Béarn

Government
  - Mayor (2020–2026): Jean Sarasola
- Area^{1}: 2.98 km^{2} (1.15 sq mi)
- Elevation: 266 m (873 ft)
- Highest elevation: 277 m (909 ft)
- Lowest elevation: 220 m (720 ft)
- Population (2023): 867
  - Density: 291/km^{2} (754/sq mi)
- Time zone: UTC+01:00 (CET)
  - Summer (DST): UTC+02:00 (CEST)
- INSEE/Postal code: 64252 /64400
- ^{1} French Land Register data, which excludes lakes, ponds, glaciers > 1 km^{2} (0.386 sq mi or 247 acres) and river estuaries.

Gurmençon (French pronunciation: [ɡyʁmɑ̃sɔ̃]) is a commune in the Pyrénées-Atlantiques department in south-western France.

== See also ==
- Communes of the Pyrénées-Atlantiques department
