= Sarrance =

- Commune
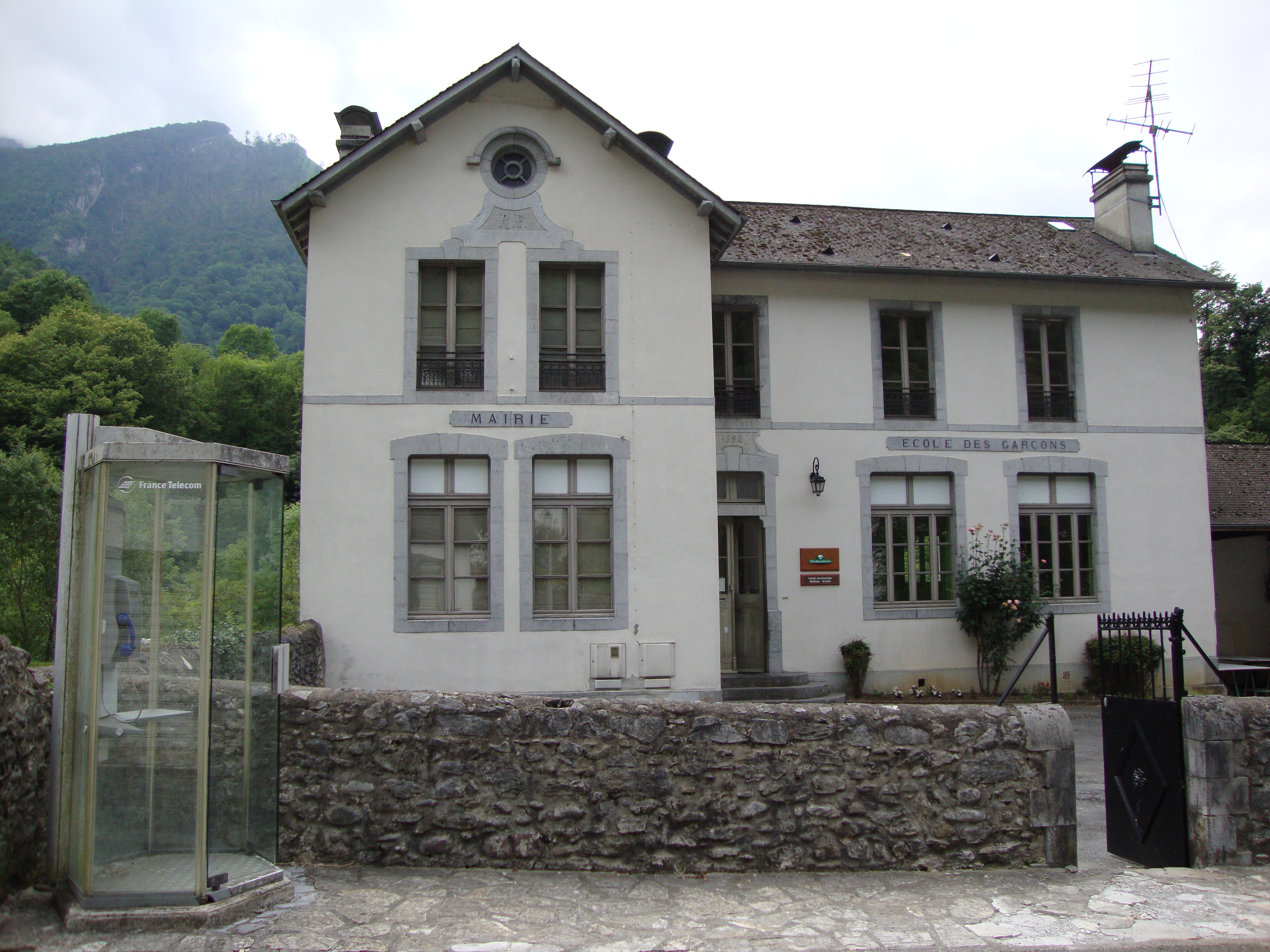
- Town Hall
- Location of Sarrance
- Location within France Location within Nouvelle-Aquitaine
- Coordinates: 43°03′08″N 0°36′03″W
- Country: France
- Region: Nouvelle-Aquitaine
- Department: Pyrénées-Atlantiques
- Arrondissement: Oloron-Sainte-Marie
- Canton: Oloron-Sainte-Marie-1
- Intercommunality: Haut Béarn

Government
  - Mayor (2020–2026): Bruno Jungalas
- Area^{1}: 46.75 km^{2} (18.05 sq mi)
- Highest elevation: 1,869 m (6,132 ft)
- Lowest elevation: 314 m (1,030 ft)
- Population (2023): 152
  - Density: 3.25/km^{2} (8.42/sq mi)
- Time zone: UTC+01:00 (CET)
  - Summer (DST): UTC+02:00 (CEST)
- INSEE/Postal code: 64506 /64490
- ^{1} French Land Register data, which excludes lakes, ponds, glaciers > 1 km^{2} (0.386 sq mi or 247 acres) and river estuaries.

Sarrance (French pronunciation: [saʁɑ̃s]; Occitan: Sarrança) is a commune in the Pyrénées-Atlantiques department in south-western France.

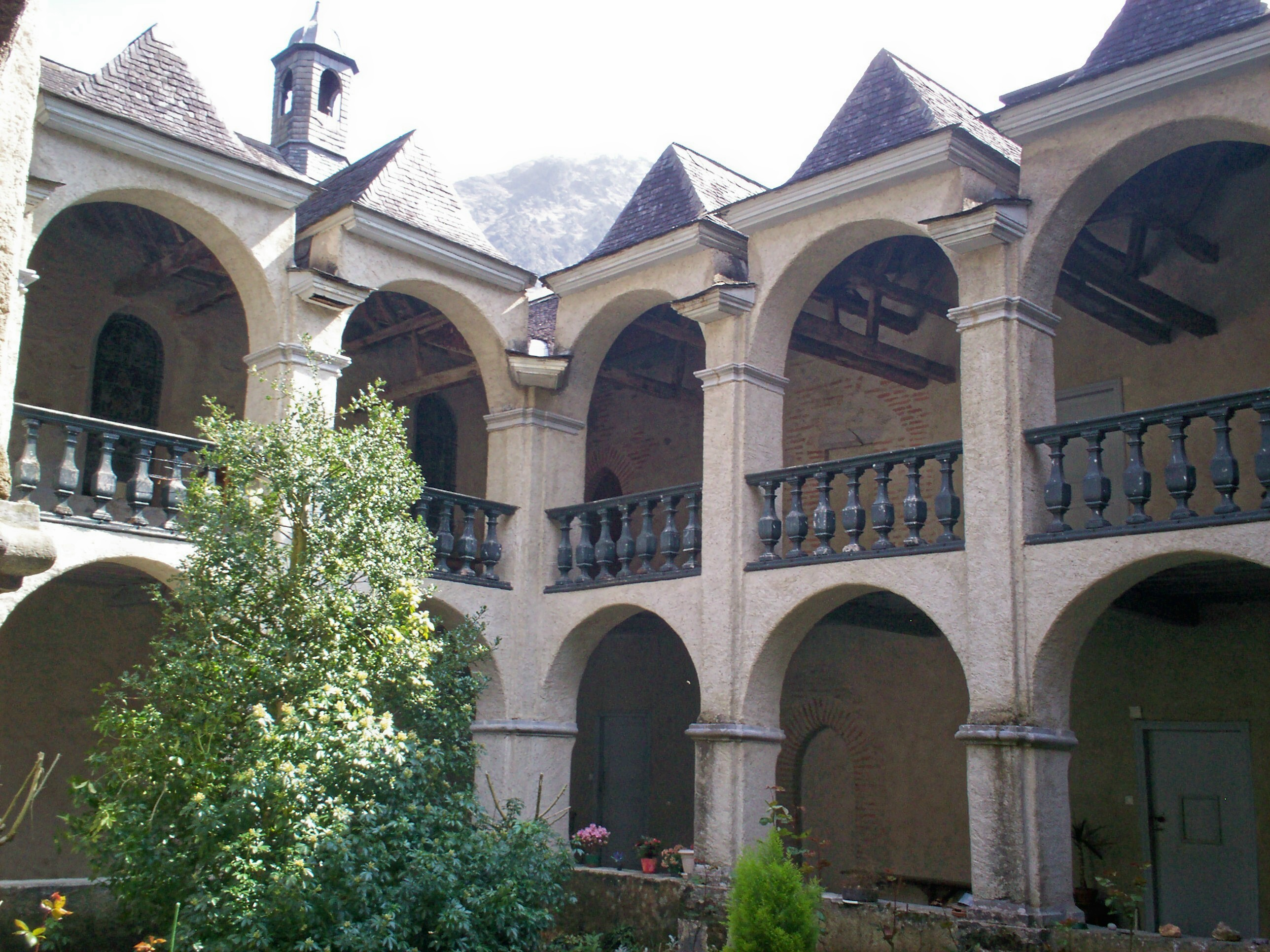

== See also ==
- Communes of the Pyrénées-Atlantiques department
