= Lurbe-Saint-Christau =

- Commune
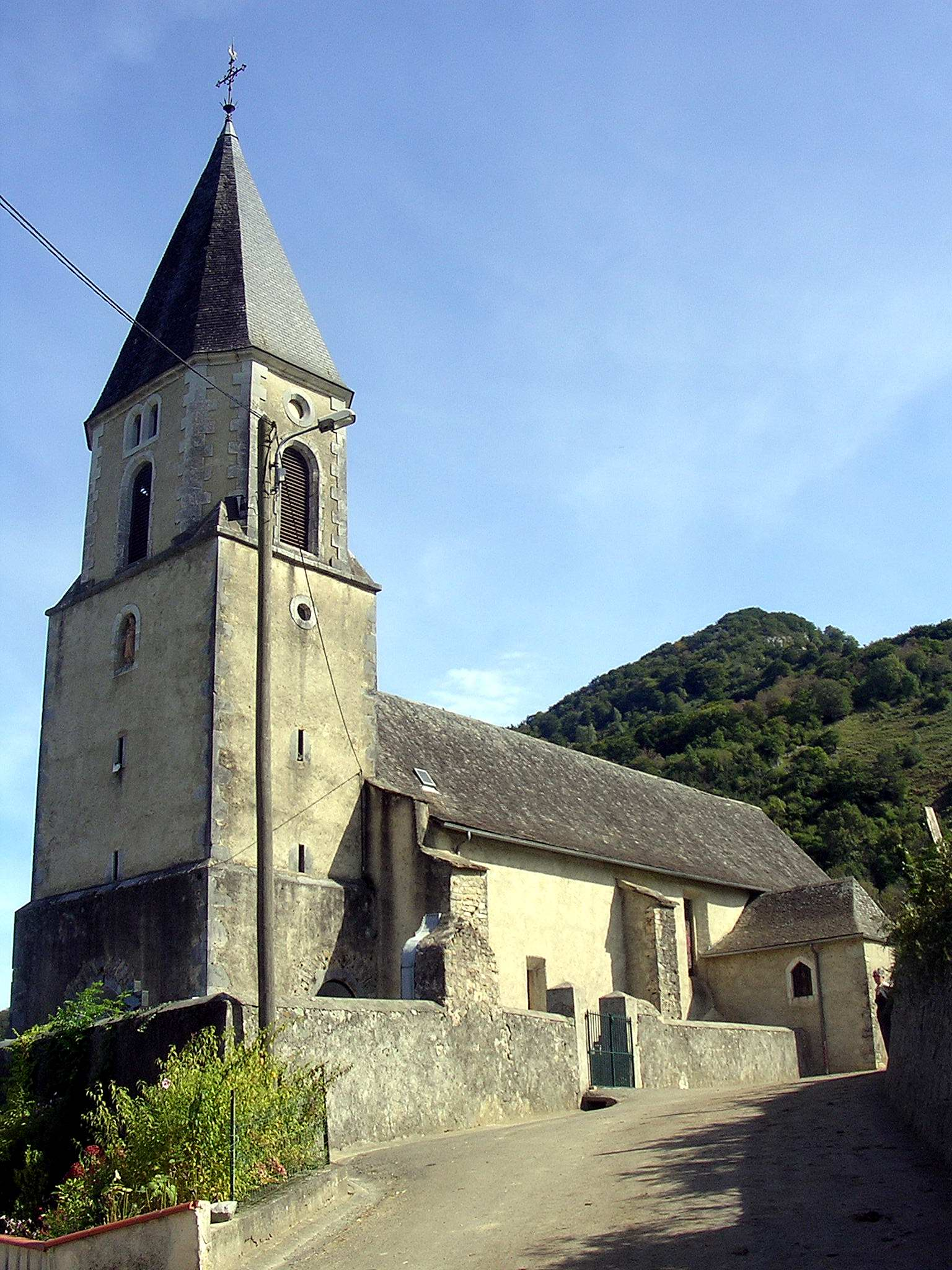
- The church of Lurbes
- Location of Lurbe-Saint-Christau
- Location within France Location within Nouvelle-Aquitaine
- Coordinates: 43°06′53″N 0°36′22″W
- Country: France
- Region: Nouvelle-Aquitaine
- Department: Pyrénées-Atlantiques
- Arrondissement: Oloron-Sainte-Marie
- Canton: Oloron-Sainte-Marie-1
- Intercommunality: Haut Béarn

Government
  - Mayor (2020–2026): Gérard Leprètre
- Area^{1}: 7.47 km^{2} (2.88 sq mi)
- Elevation: 300 m (980 ft)
- Highest elevation: 1,200 m (3,900 ft)
- Lowest elevation: 259 m (850 ft)
- Population (2023): 207
  - Density: 27.7/km^{2} (71.8/sq mi)
- Time zone: UTC+01:00 (CET)
  - Summer (DST): UTC+02:00 (CEST)
- INSEE/Postal code: 64360 /64660
- ^{1} French Land Register data, which excludes lakes, ponds, glaciers > 1 km^{2} (0.386 sq mi or 247 acres) and river estuaries.

Lurbe-Saint-Christau (French pronunciation: [lyʁb sɛ̃ kʁisto]; Occitan: Lurbe e Sent Cristau) is a commune in the Pyrénées-Atlantiques department in south-western France.

== See also ==
- Communes of the Pyrénées-Atlantiques department
