= Arette =

- Commune
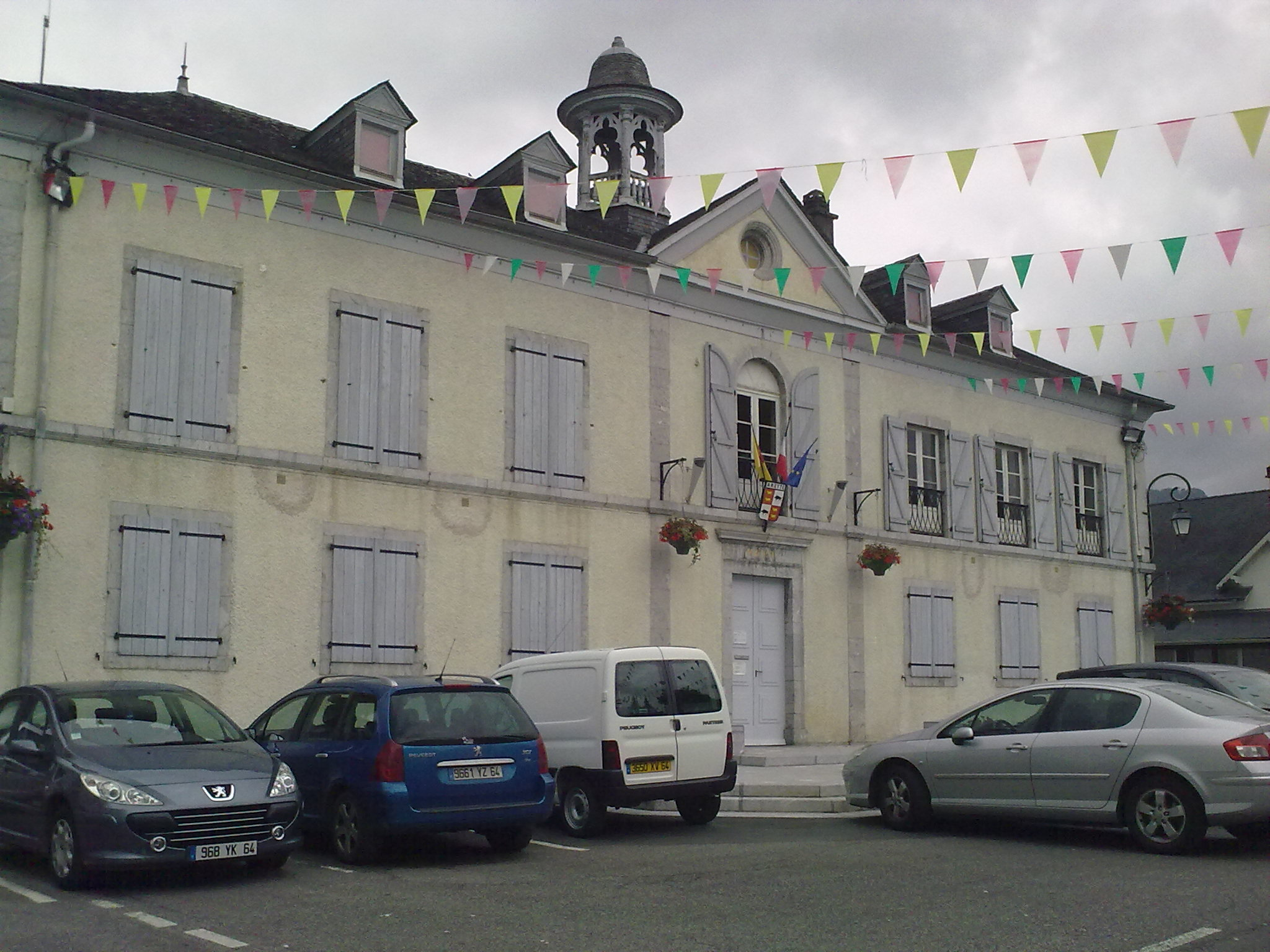
- Town hall

- Coat of arms
- Location of Arette
- Location within France Location within Nouvelle-Aquitaine
- Coordinates: 43°05′46″N 0°42′56″W
- Country: France
- Region: Nouvelle-Aquitaine
- Department: Pyrénées-Atlantiques
- Arrondissement: Oloron-Sainte-Marie
- Canton: Oloron-Sainte-Marie-1
- Intercommunality: Haut Béarn

Government
  - Mayor (2020–2026): Pierre Casabonne
- Area^{1}: 92.23 km^{2} (35.61 sq mi)
- Highest elevation: 2,315 m (7,595 ft)
- Lowest elevation: 292 m (958 ft)
- Population (2023): 1,032
  - Density: 11.19/km^{2} (28.98/sq mi)
- Time zone: UTC+01:00 (CET)
  - Summer (DST): UTC+02:00 (CEST)
- INSEE/Postal code: 64040 /64570
- ^{1} French Land Register data, which excludes lakes, ponds, glaciers > 1 km^{2} (0.386 sq mi or 247 acres) and river estuaries.

Arette (French pronunciation: [aʁɛt]; Occitan: Areta) is a commune in the Pyrénées-Atlantiques department in the Nouvelle-Aquitaine region of southwestern France. It is located in the arrondissement of Oloron-Sainte-Marie and the canton of Oloron-Sainte-Marie-1.

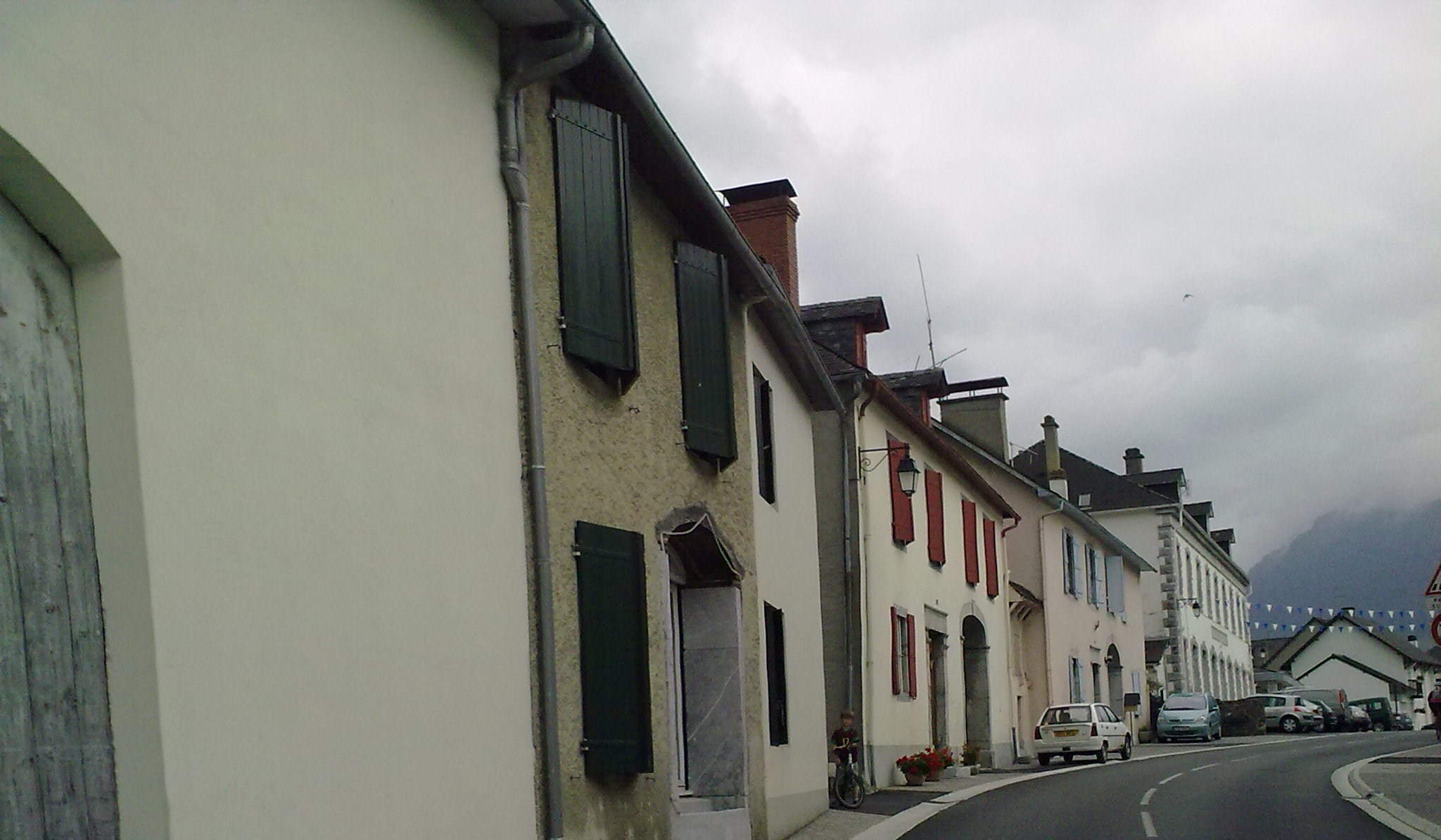
Arette Village.

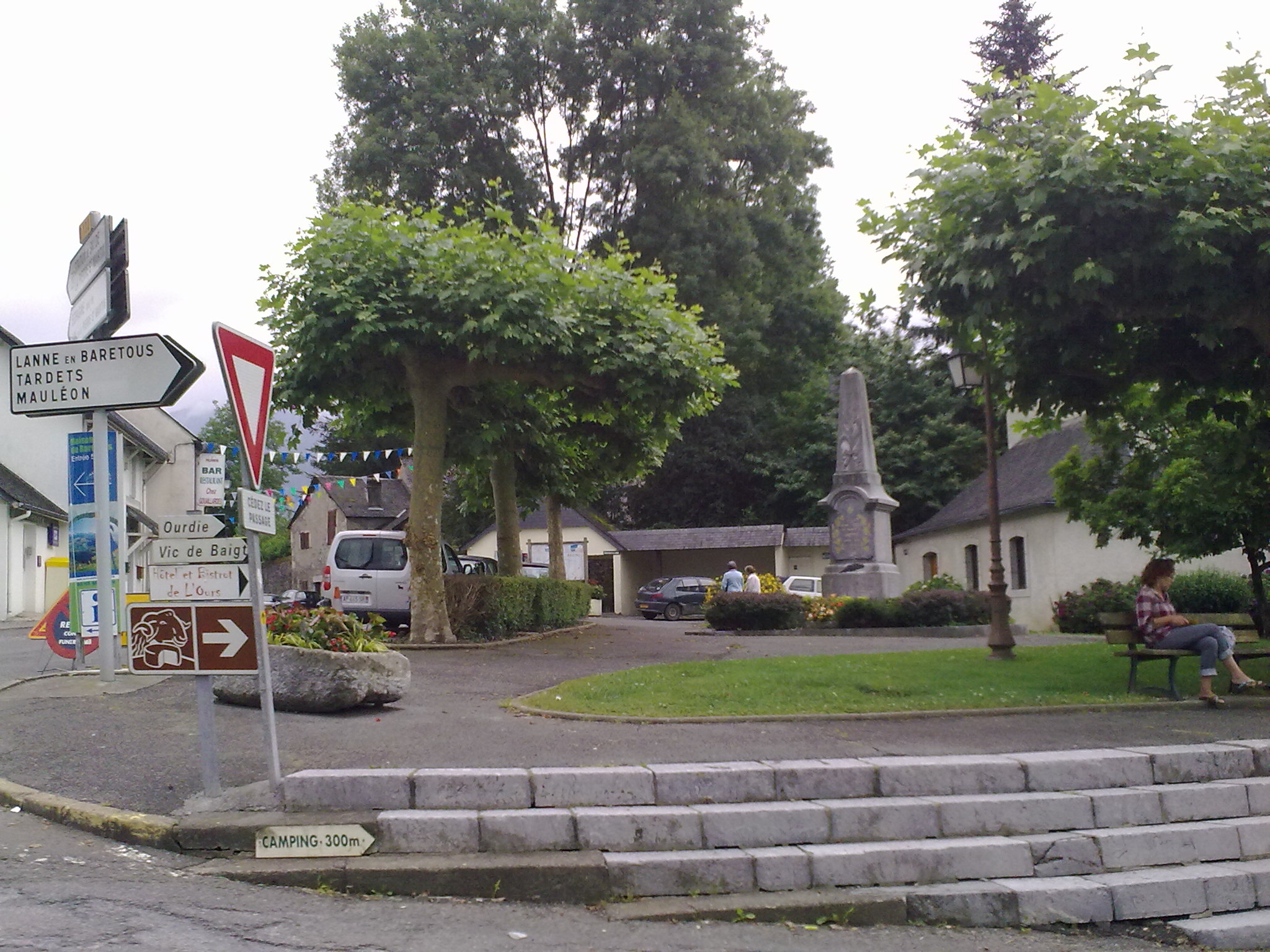
The War Memorial.

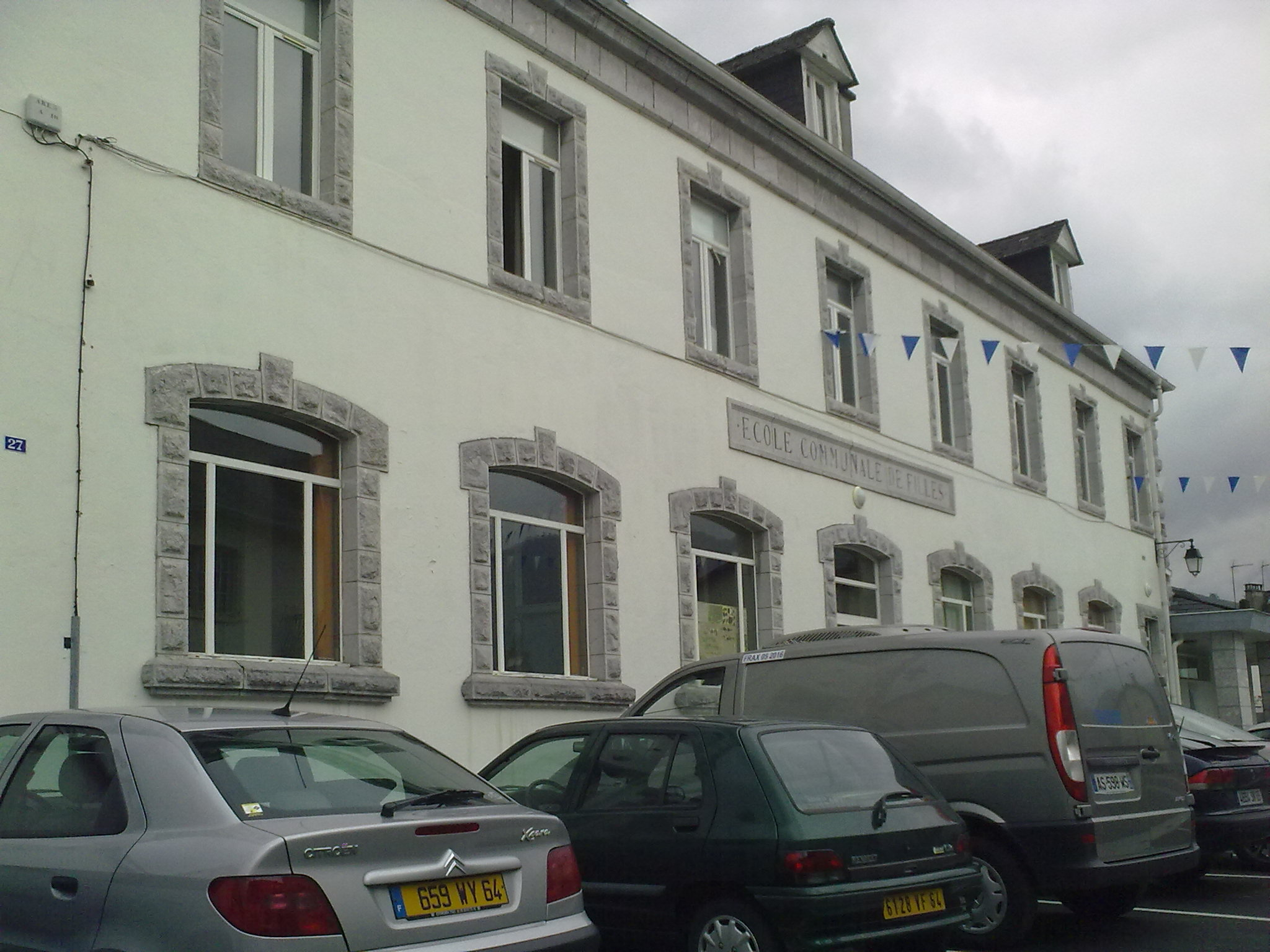
The Primary School.

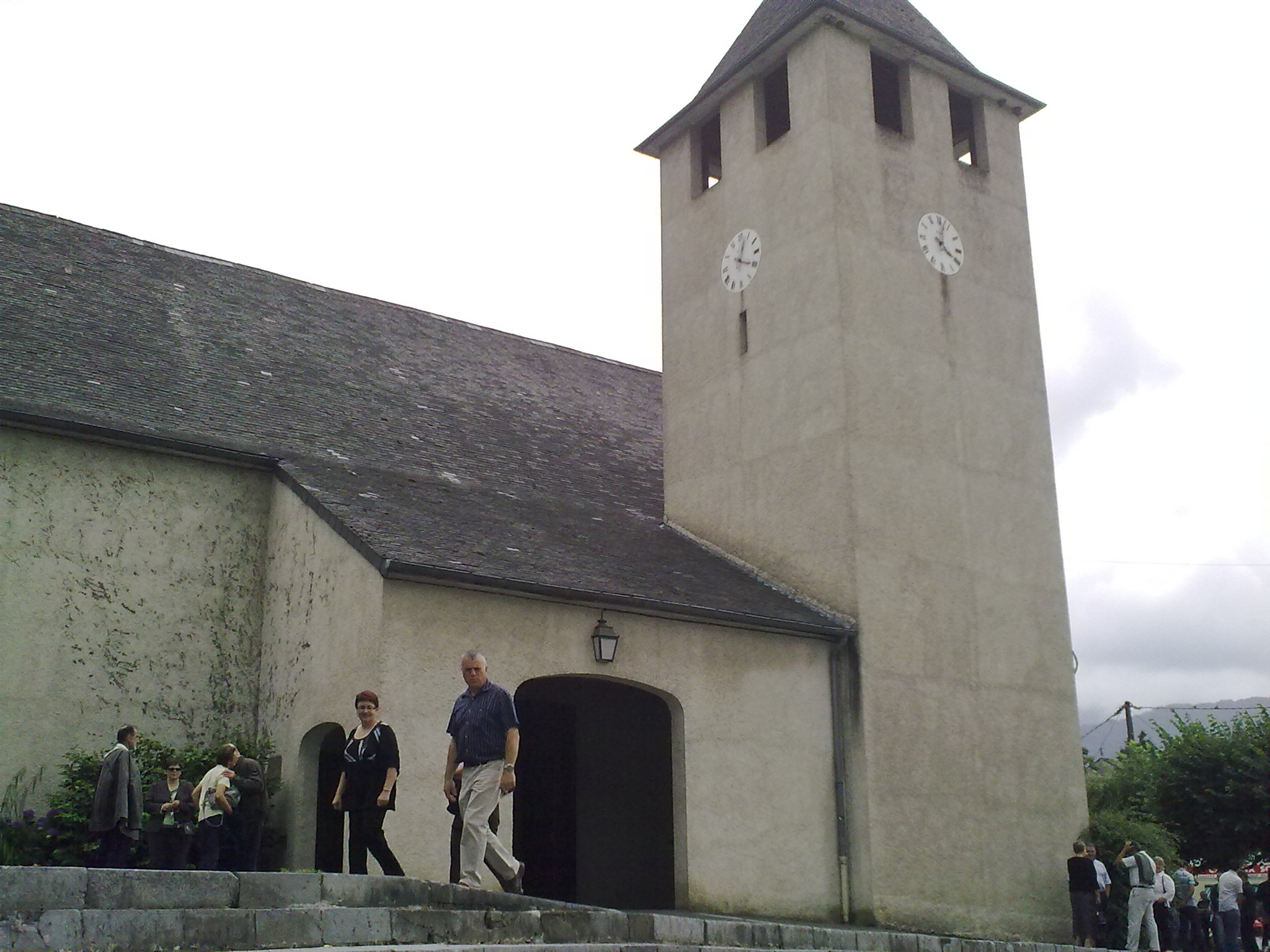
Arette Church.

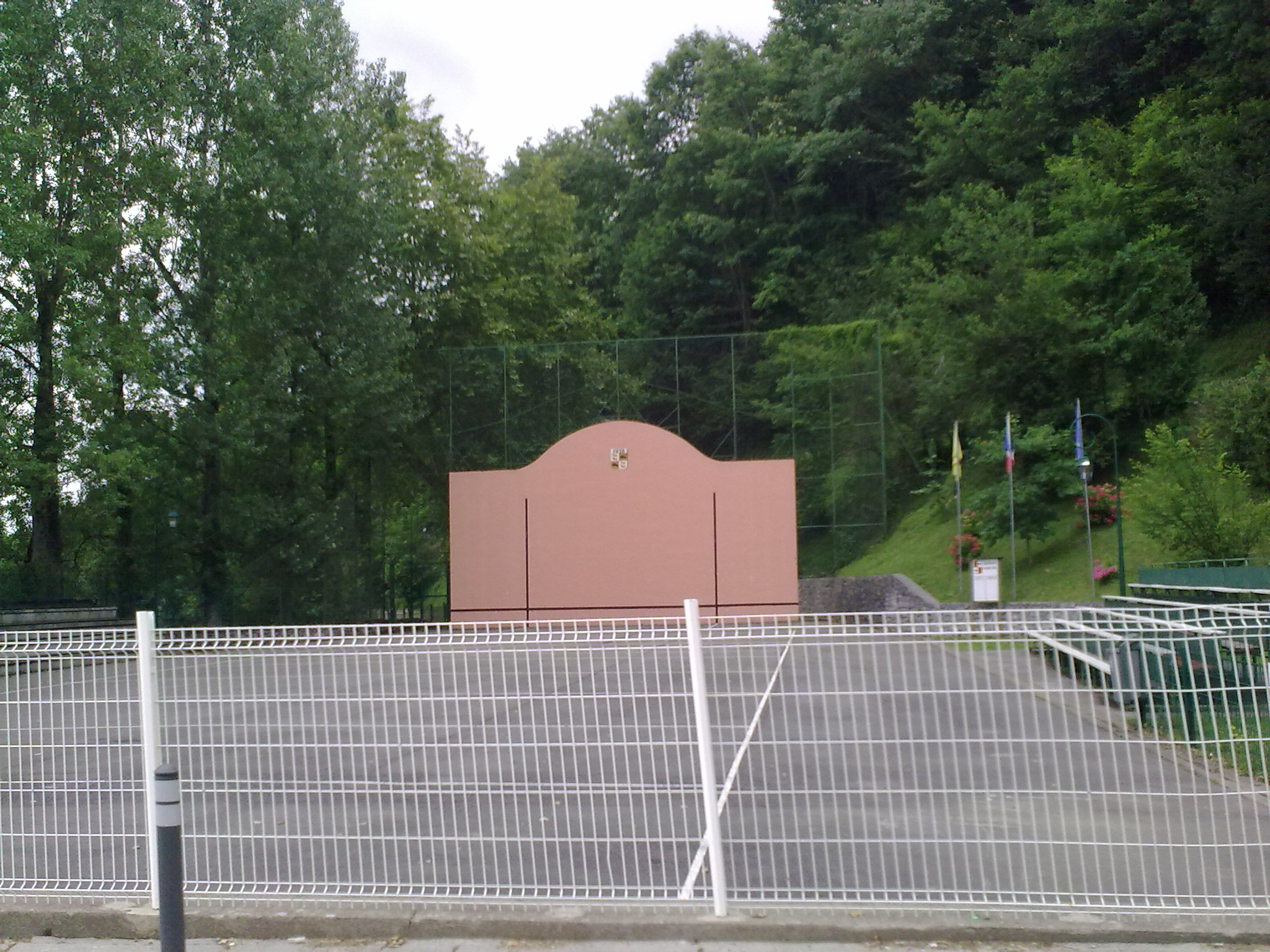
The fronton.

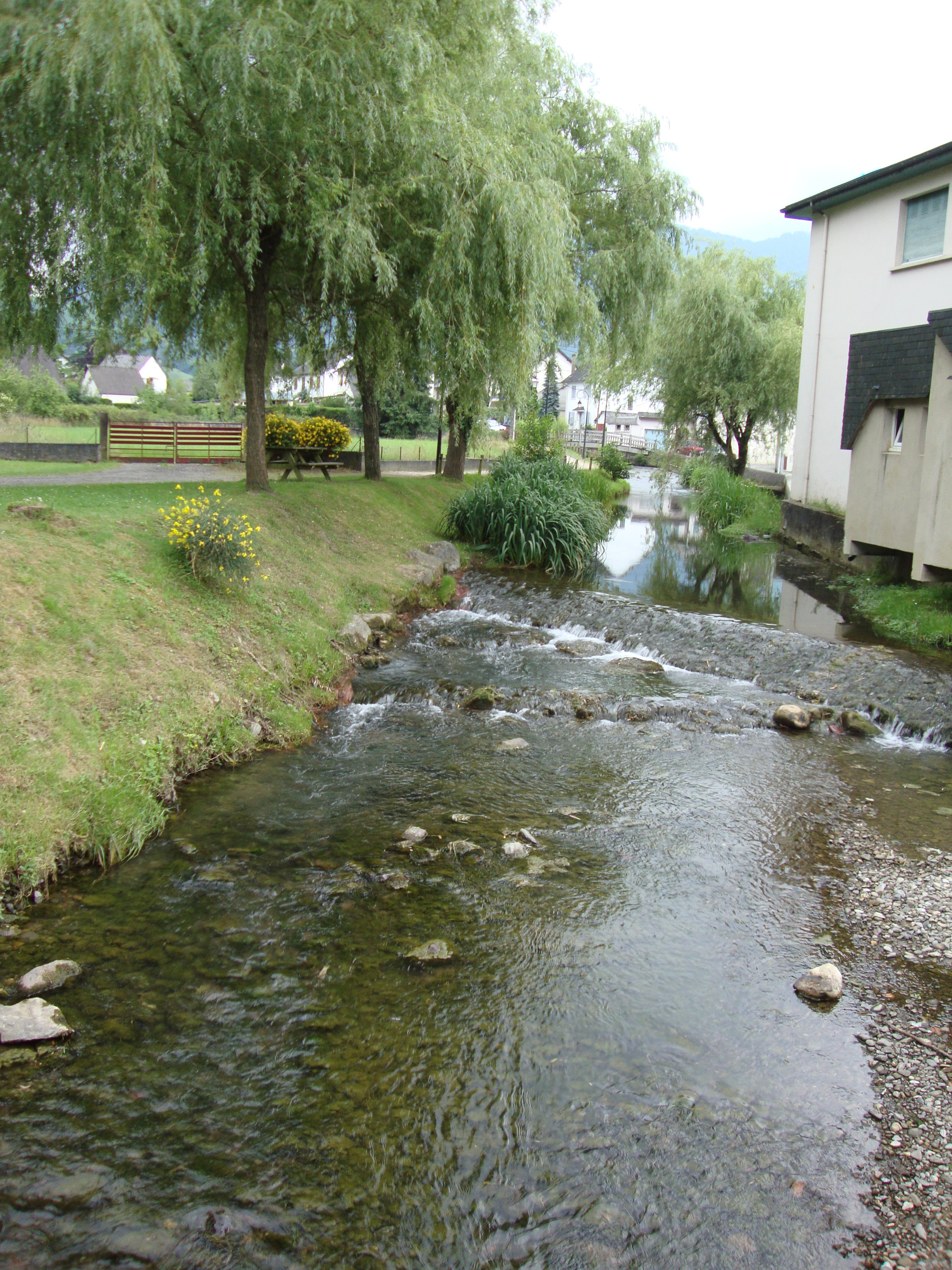
The Vert d'Arette.

== Geography ==
Arrete is located some 15 km south by south-west of Oloron-Sainte-Marie and some 4 km south-east of Aramits. It lies close to both the French Basque region and borders Spain in the south. It is within the borders of Béarn, one of the traditional French provinces.

Access to the commune is by French rail SNCF to Pau, and a short bus ride to Arrete. Less scenic is the automobile route: D918 road from Lanne-en-Barétous in the north-west coming south-east to the village then continuing east to Issor. The D132 goes south from the village down the length of the commune following a tortuous mountain route before exiting the southern border of the commune over the Col de la Pierre St Martin (1,760m), which is also the border with Spain, and becoming the Spanish NA-137 which continues to Isaba. The D341 also goes south-east from the village then south, connecting with the D241 at the Col de Labays (1,351m) going east to join the E7 highway south of Sarrance, then continuing along the south-western border to join the D441 south of the commune. The D133 also goes north from the village to Aramits.

Bus Route 848 of the Intercity Network of Pyrénées-Atlantiques (Transports 64) links Arette to Oloron-Sainte-Marie.

Arette is a very large commune and has a land area of 92 km^{2}. It is also mountainous (the La Pierre Saint-Martin ski resort is within its borders, for example) and its highest peak is the 2,315 m Soum Couy, which is situated not far from the 2,504 m Pic d'Anie, the highest peak in the western Pyrenees. From Pic d'Anie the mountain range extends downwards for approximately 20 km, forming both sides of the Aspe Valley to the north-west. The Vert d'Arette (a tributary of the Vert) flows through this valley. The ancient village (also named Arette) from which the commune extends is located at an altitude of 316 m in the valley of Barétous, which lies between the aforementioned Aspe valley, to its east, and the Basque province of Soule, to its west.

=== Hydrography ===
Located in the Drainage basin of the Adour, the commune is the source of numerous tributaries of the Vert which is itself a tributary of Gave d'Oloron. The largest tributary flowing through the commune is the Vert d'Arrette however many other streams flow north towards the Vert including: the Abat Daurèye and its tributary, the Banu Erreka (accompanied by the Ruisseau de Aurèye); Ibarcis Erreka; the Lancy; the Ruisseau de Gurré and its tributary the Ruisseau de Lagaretche; the Ruisseau de Hournères and its tributary, the Ouettone; the Ruisseau de Légorre and its tributary, the Cassiau de Ber; the streams of Nécore, Soulayets, Talu Gros, and Virgou with the tributary of the latter, the Arrigau (accompanied itself in the commune by the Bachère).

The Gave de Lourdios, a tributary of the Gave d'Aspe, and its tributaries, the Arric and the Moulia (and their tributaries, Casteigt Erreka and the Ruisseau de Poussious) also pass through the commune. The Gave de Sainte-Engrâce, a tributary of the Saison, and its tributary, the Montcholako Erreka also flow in the territory of the commune.

=== Places and Hamlets ===
- Abat d'Ibarry
- Adam
- Gouffre d'Ahuzthéguia
- Ambielle
- Ambile
- Cabane d'Ance
- Apons
- Pont de l'Araille
- Gouffre de l'Arbre Sec
- Pas d'Arlas
- L'Arre de Bas
- Arrègle
- Arritsens
- Aspit
- Aurasse
- Pont d'Aurèye
- Cabane d'Auriste
- Ayesten
- Barbé
- Le Pas des Basques
- Bayrès
- Bécari
- Bélatch Paoussaguia
- Bellegarde
- Bellocq
- Bernardicou
- Bersacalongue
- Ancien Moulin de Bignau
- Col de Bissouritto (995 metres)
- Bitailloué
- Bonnehe
- Bonneu
- Bordehore
- Col de Boticotch
- Bois de Bouchet
- Bourdès
- Bourdet
- Les Bourrugues
- Burs
- Coume de Cagastié
- Cam dét Ragutio
- Camgros
- Camou
- Candau
- Capdelabat
- Capdeville
- Pas de Caque
- Casabonne
- Casamayou
- Casaurang
- Casaux
- La Cassette
- Cassiau
- Castagne (Two places)
- Cataplous
- Cerciat
- Château-Forez
- Pédaing de Chousse
- Plateau de la Chousse
- Col de Cissaugue or Nécore
- Pont de Cissaugue
- Costemale
- Costes
- Coudure
- Couillarsut
- Cabane du Coup
- Couretcoup
- Courétot
- Les Courréges
- Cousturé
- Coutchet de Lacq
- Coutchet dets Crapes
- L'Arre de Soum Couy
- La Croix du Berger
- Croix des Contrebandiers
- Davancens
- Domecq
- Fontaine Dorbe
- Source de l'Ermite
- Cabane d'Escuret de Bas
- Cabanes d'Escuret
- Esperabens
- Pas des Estes
- Estournès
- Estratte
- Cabane de Féas
- Pont du Fort
- Frinchaboy
- Gabarrat
- Col de Garbas
- Gesta
- Goaillardeu
- Guilhers (Sheds and fountain)
- Guren
- Cap de Gurré (ruins)
- Handu
- Source d'Harrigagna
- Hondagneu
- Grange Hondagneu
- Houillis
- Houndane (spring)
- Pont du Hourat
- Houratate
- Hourcate
- Hournères
- Hum
- Borde de Hum
- Ibarry - Coigt de Hecore
- Granges d'Irasts
- Coume d'Issaux
- Cabane d'Issort
- Jantet
- Labarthe
- Labatrère
- Cabanes de Labays
- Col de Labays (1,351m)
- Laborde
- Laclouque
- Lacoume
- Laculère
- Lagarde
- Lagaretche
- Lagrave
- Lahore
- Pas de Lamayou
- Lancy
- Lapeyre
- Coume de Larrayet
- Larricq
- Croix de Larricq
- Le pont Larron
- Camp de Larruga
- Lassalle
- Bois de Lèche
- Lèchéko Zingla
- Légorre d'Ibarry
- Lembeyou
- Gouffre Lépineux
- Mail de Lerre
- Létone
- Pas de la Leugue
- Libarde
- Col de Lie (601m)
- Lilles
- Longis
- Lourdios d'Arette
- La Lousère
- Lucq
- Col de Mahourat
- Le Mail blanc
- Les Malices
- Cayolar de Mantchola or Cabane d'Etchébar
- Pas de Massaré
- Massaugues
- Coume Mayou
- Maysou
- Mesplou
- Bois de Métouret
- Mirassou
- Mirassou Bas
- Mirassou Haut
- Moulia
- La Mouline
- Moura
- Nario
- Nouqué
- Noutary
- Noye
- Oron
- Cabane d'Oumarre
- Bois de l'Oumbre-del-Hourcq
- Gouffre de l'Ours
- Pagnon
- Pédaing
- Pélou
- Les Pernes
- Cabane de la Pernotte (ruins)
- Pescamou
- Borde des Peyres
- Peyret
- Arette La Pierre Saint-Martin
- Col de la Pierre St Martin
- L'Arre Planère
- Pouey
- Poursuca
- Le Pourtet
- Prat
- Granges de Prat
- La Puyade
- Rachet
- Roucam
- Pène Rouye
- Sainte-Gracie
- Saint-Marty
- Salanove
- Salet
- Salies
- Sarrelangue
- Saudiat
- Plateau de Séguitte
- Pas de Single
- Bois de Soudet
- Cabanes de Soudet
- Soulaing
- Soubies
- Soubirou
- Soulé
- Borde de Soulé
- Sous Pène
- Superville
- Col de Suscousse or Garatéko L'époua
- Talou
- Talou d'Arnaune
- Talou de Bouc
- Tamarpouey
- Tapie
- Col de Taules
- Braca de Termy
- Le Terrail
- Gouffre La Tête Sauvage
- Tourette
- Tourumy (harnessed spring)
- Col de Tremeil
- Camp d'Urdette
- Zélukobortha (chasm)

== Toponymy ==
The commune name in béarnais is Arèta (according to the classical norm of Occitan). The name comes from the Basque ar- meaning "stone" and from the locative suffix -eta meaning "stony place".

The following table details the origins of the commune name and other names in the commune.

Name	Spelling	Date	Source	Page	Origin	Description
Arette	Areta	1186	Raymond	9	Barcelona	Village
	Rete	1383	Raymond	9	Luntz	
	Arete	1385	Raymond	9	Census	
	Erete	1440	Raymond	9	Barétous	
	Aretha	1444	Raymond	10	Cour Major	
	Eretha	1444	Raymond	10	Cour Major	
	Hereta	1538	Raymond	10	Reformation	
	Saint Pierre d'Arette	1674	Raymond	10	Insinuations	
	Arrette	1750	Cassini			
	Arete	1801	Ldh/EHESS/Cassini		Bulletin des lois	
Arrègle	le molii d'Arregle	1385	Raymond	141	Census	Farm and a Mill on the Vert d'Arette
	Aregle en Baretous	1433	Raymond	141	Notaries	
	Aregla	1538	Raymond	141	Reformation	
	Réglé	1863	Raymond	141		
Arlas	Arlas	1538	Raymond	10	Reformation	Mountain on the Spanish border
L'Arrigau	lo ariu aperat la Rigau	1538	Raymond	12	Reformation	A stream rising in Arette and which joins the Vert at Aramits
	L'Arrigas	1863	Raymond	12		
Aurèye	L'Aureye	1863	Raymond	17		Stream rising in Arette, tributary of the Vert
Bayrès	Bayres	1538	Raymond	25	Reformation	Farm
	Bayres	1863	Raymond	25		
Col de Bissourritto	Col de Bissourritte	1863	Raymond	32		Mountain Pass
Bois de Bouchet	Bouchette	1863	Raymond	34		Wood
La Chousse	La Chousse	1863	Raymond	50		Stream rising in Arette, a tributary of the Vert
Costemale	Costemale	1863	Raymond	52		Mountain
Les Courréges	Les Courréges	1863	Raymond	53		Mountain
Estratte	Estrate	1385	Raymond	62	Census	Farm
	Estrata	1538	Raymond	62	Reformation	
	Estrate	1863	Raymond	62		
Col de Garbas	Col de Garbas	1863	Raymond	67		Pass between the communes of Arette and Lanne-en-Barétous
Guilhers	Le Pas de Guilhers	1863	Raymond	74		Wood between the communes of Arette and Lées-Athas
Hournères	Le Hourner	1863	Raymond	80		Stream rising in Arette and joining the Chousse
Lagaretche	Lagarretche	1863	Raymond	89		Wood
Le Pont Larron	Le Pont Larron	1863	Raymond	95		Bridge named after the former name of the Vert d'Arette: Larron
Lèche	La singla de Lexe	1589	Raymond	98	Reformation	Mountain and Wood
Légorre d'Ibarry	Legorre	1863	Raymond	98		Mountain
Mantchola	Le Manchola	1863	Raymond	108		Stream delineating the border between Arette and Sainte-Engrâce before joining the Uhaïtxa
Le Nécore	Le Col de Nécore	1863	Raymond	122		Mountain Pass. A stream of the same name rises at the pass and joins the Vert d'Arette in Arette
Pernalatte	Pernalatte	1863	Raymond	134		Mountain
La Pernotte	La Pernotte	1863	Raymond	134		Stream, tributary of the Chousse
Pescamou	Pescamou	1863	Raymond	134		Mountain and Pass on the Spanish frontier
La Pierre Saint-Martin	La peyre de Sent-Martin, frontière de Navarre	1589	Raymond	150	Reformation	Assembly place for the inhabitants of the Barétous Valley in France and Roncal in Spain
Le Pourtet	Pourtet	1863	Raymond	139		Mountain on the Spanish border extending to Arette and Lées-Athas
Le col de Soès	Le col de Soès	1863	Raymond	161		Mountain Pass
Soulaing	Soulaing	1863	Raymond	163		Mountain between Arette and Osse-en-Aspe and a stream, tributary of the Lourdios
Soulayets	Le Soulayet	1863	Raymond	163		Stream that flows through Arette and joins the Vert
Tamarpouey	Tamarpoey	1385	Raymond	166	Census	Farm
	Tamarpoey	1863	Raymond			
Le Termy	Le Termy	1863	Raymond	167		Stream rising in Arette and joining the Uhaïtxa at Sainte-Engrâce
Trémeil	Torrumie	1703	Raymond	168	Regulation	Mountain across Arette and Lanne-en-Barétous
	Tremeilh	1863	Raymond	168		

Sources:

- Raymond: Topographic Dictionary of the Department of Basses-Pyrenees, 1863, on the page numbers indicated in the table. (in French)
- Grosclaude: Toponymic Dictionary of communes, Béarn, 2006 (in French)
- Cassini: Cassini Map from 1750
- Ldh/EHESS/Cassini: Des villages de Cassini aux communes d'aujourd'hui: Commune data sheet Arette, EHESS (in French).

Origins:

- Barcelona: Titles of Barcelona.
- Luntz:
- Census: Census of Béarn
- Barétous: Titles of the Valley of Barétous
- Cour Major: Regulations of the Cour Major
- Reformation: Reformation of Béarn
- Insinuations: Insinuations of the Diocese of Oloron
- Notaries: Notaries of Oloron
- Regulation: Regulation of Arette

== History ==
In 1385 there were 87 fires in Arette and it depended on the Bailiwick of Oloron.

On 13 August 1967 the village of Arette was 80% destroyed by an earthquake that killed one person. The ruined clock tower of the church indicated the exact time of the earthquake: 11:10 p.m. Seismic waves were felt from Pau to Tarbes and Bayonne.

=== Heraldry ===
Arms of Arette	Blazon: Quarterly, 1 and 4 Gules with two cows of Or hooved, collared, belled, and horned in Azure one above the other; 2 and 3 Argent with a boar of Sable.

== Administration ==
List of Successive Mayors

Mayors from the French Revolution to 1942

From	To	Name
1793	1800	Ignace Camou
1800	1807	Jean Lasalle
1808	1813	Pierre Hum
1813	1831	Jean-Pierre Salet
1831	1835	Jean Carrère
1835	1837	Pierre Camgros
1837	1843	Étienne Superville
1843	1848	Jean-François Sérée
1848	1853	Pierre-Joseph Castéran
1853	1856	Jean-François Sérée
1857	1861	Philippe Salies
1861	1872	Charles-Henri Fischer
1872	1877	Jean Bergé
1877	1884	Charles-Henri Fischer
1884	1890	Emmanuel Salet
1890	1892	François Dabancens
1892	1894	Charles-Henri Fischer
1894	1906	Jean-Baptiste Labourdette
1906	1907	Vincent Lagrave
1907	1916	Bernard Trébucq
1919	1942	Pierre Casabonne

Mayors from 1942

From	To	Name	Party	Position
1942	1952	Michel Lagrave		
1952	1989	Jean-Marie Lonne-Peyret		
1989	2001	Joseph Arrègle		
2001	2026	Pierre Casabonne	DVD	General Councillor

=== Inter-communality ===
Arette is part of six inter-communal structures:

- the Communauté de communes du Haut Béarn;
- the SIVU La Verna;
- the energy association of Pyrénées-Atlantiques;
- the inter-communal association for study and management of the Drainage basin of the Vert and its tributaries;
- the joint association for la Pierre Saint-Martin;
- the joint association for Haut-Béarn.

=== Twinning ===
Arette has twinning associations with:

- Isaba (Spain) since 1977.
- Roncal (Spain) since 1991.

== Demography ==
Historical population

Year	Pop.	±% p.a.
1793	1,762	—
1800	1,561	−1.72%
1806	1,826	+2.65%
1821	2,014	+0.66%
1831	2,139	+0.60%
1836	2,176	+0.34%
1841	2,245	+0.63%
1846	2,245	+0.00%
1851	2,218	−0.24%
1856	2,069	−1.38%
1861	2,113	+0.42%
1866	2,078	−0.33%
1872	2,065	−0.10%
1876	1,982	−1.02%
1881	1,990	+0.08%
1886	2,050	+0.60%
1891	1,905	−1.46%
1896	1,851	−0.57%
1901	1,743	−1.20%

Year	Pop.	±% p.a.
1906	1,734	−0.10%
1911	1,761	+0.31%
1921	1,444	−1.97%
1926	1,452	+0.11%
1931	1,404	−0.67%
1936	1,377	−0.39%
1946	1,309	−0.51%
1954	1,171	−1.38%
1962	1,189	+0.19%
1968	1,055	−1.97%
1975	1,166	+1.44%
1982	1,117	−0.61%
1990	1,137	+0.22%
1999	1,094	−0.43%
2007	1,092	−0.02%
2012	1,068	−0.44%
2017	1,057	−0.21%
2023	1,032	−0.40%

Source: EHESS and INSEE

== Economy ==
The economy of the commune is primarily oriented toward agriculture and livestock (cattle and sheep) and logging. The town is part of the Appellation d'origine contrôlée (AOC) zone designation of Ossau-iraty.

== Culture and Heritage ==
=== Civil heritage ===
The Barétous Museum is located in the commune. It features permanent collections on pastoralism and the Junta Roncal or "Tribute of the Three Cows".

=== Religious heritage ===
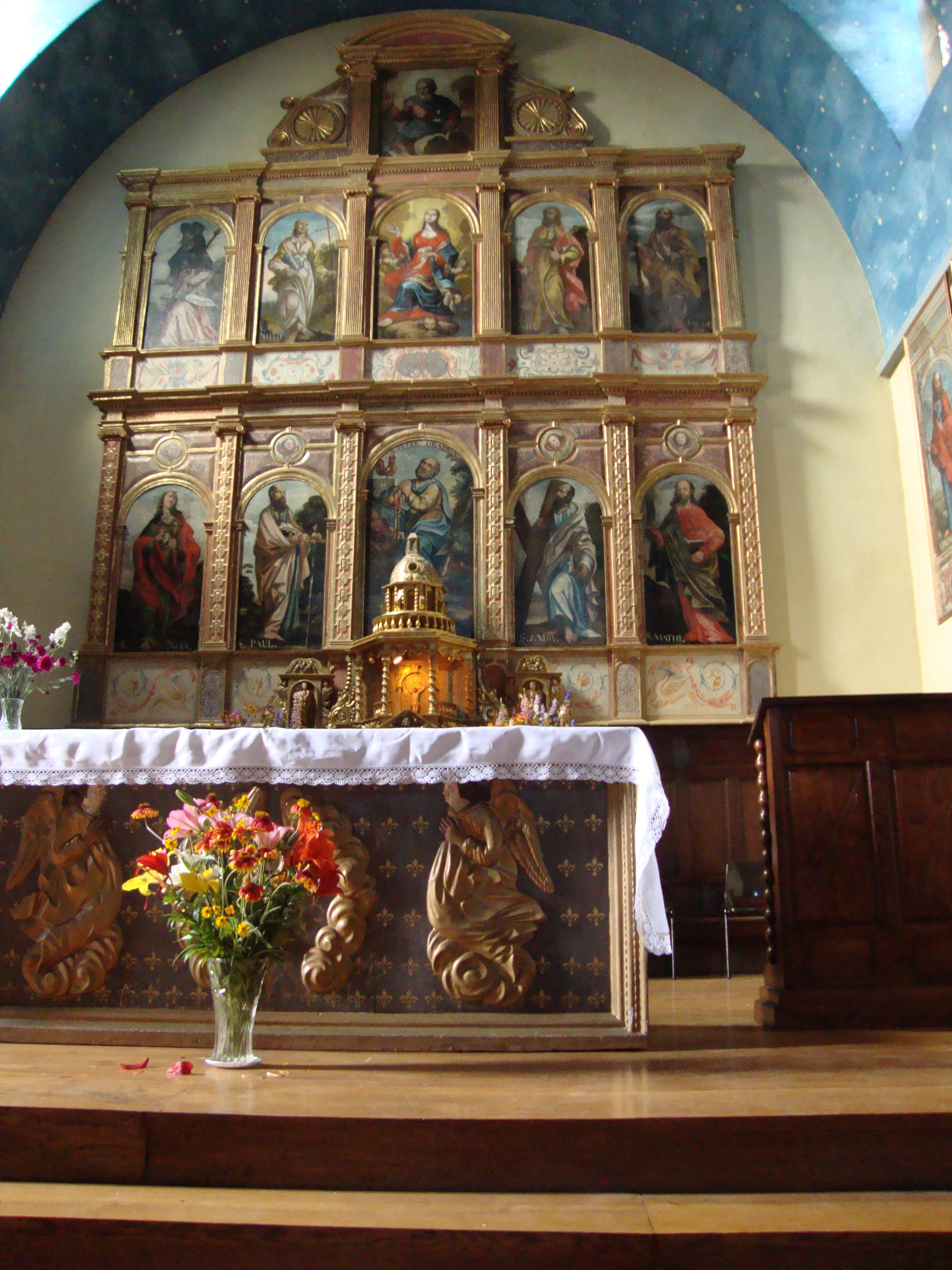
The Retable in the church

The former Lay Abbey (17th century) is registered as an historical monument.

The Arette Church contains several items that are registered as historical objects:

- A Chandelier (18th century)
- An Altar and Retable (18th century)
- An Eagle-Lectern (15th century)
- A Statue: Virgin and child (16th century)

=== Environmental heritage ===
- The Soum de Liorry (1,012m)
- The Biscarroules Peak (1,017m)
- The Sudou Peak (1,167m)
- The Légorre Peak(1,359m)
- The Soum de Soudet(1,542m)
- The Guilhers Peak(1,597m)
- The Soum de Leche (1,839m)
- The Arlas Peak (2,044m) on the Spanish border
- The Arres d'Anie(2,120m)

There is an arboretum in the east of the commune.

=== Arette Picture Gallery ===
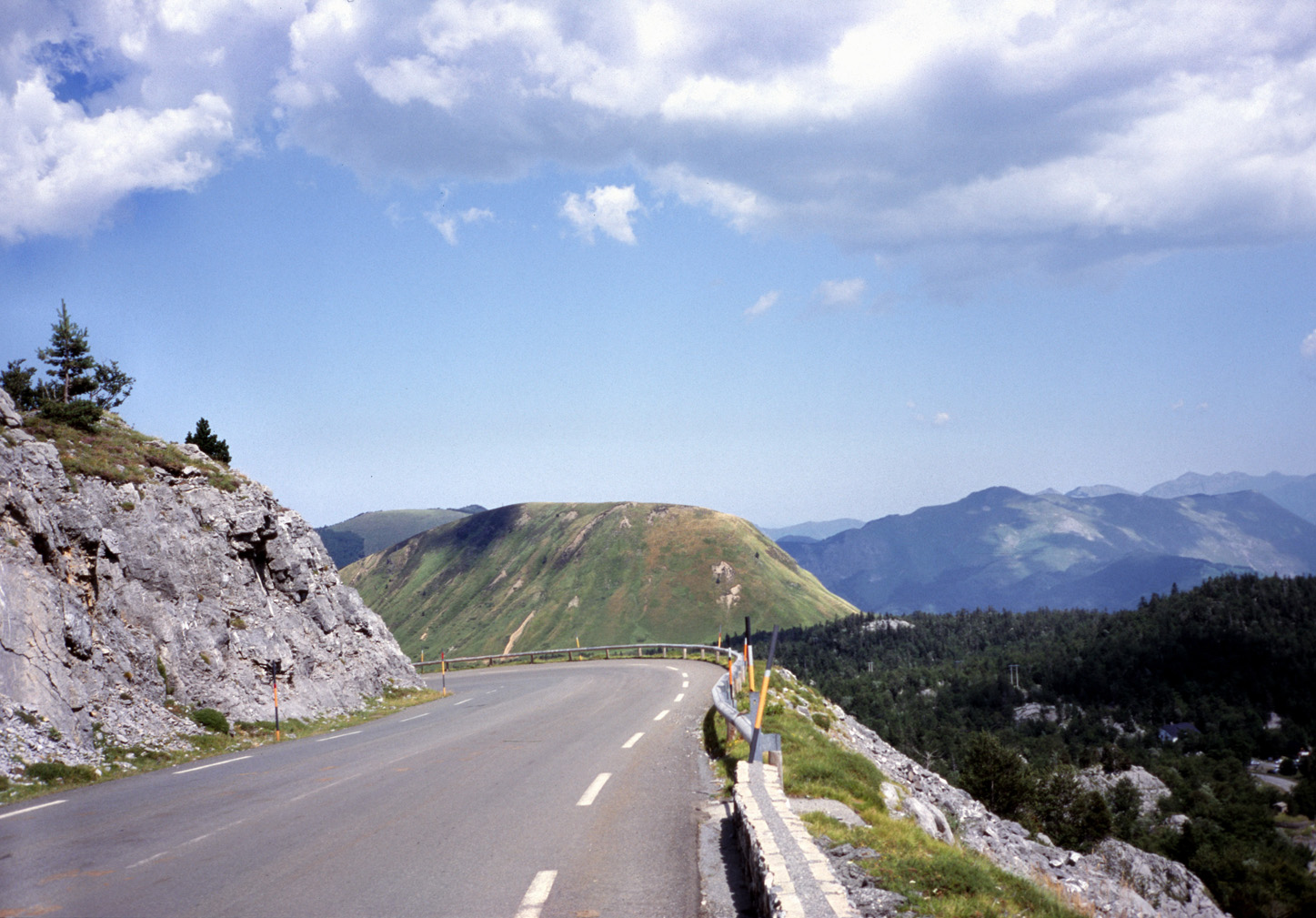
Col de la Pierre Saint Martin

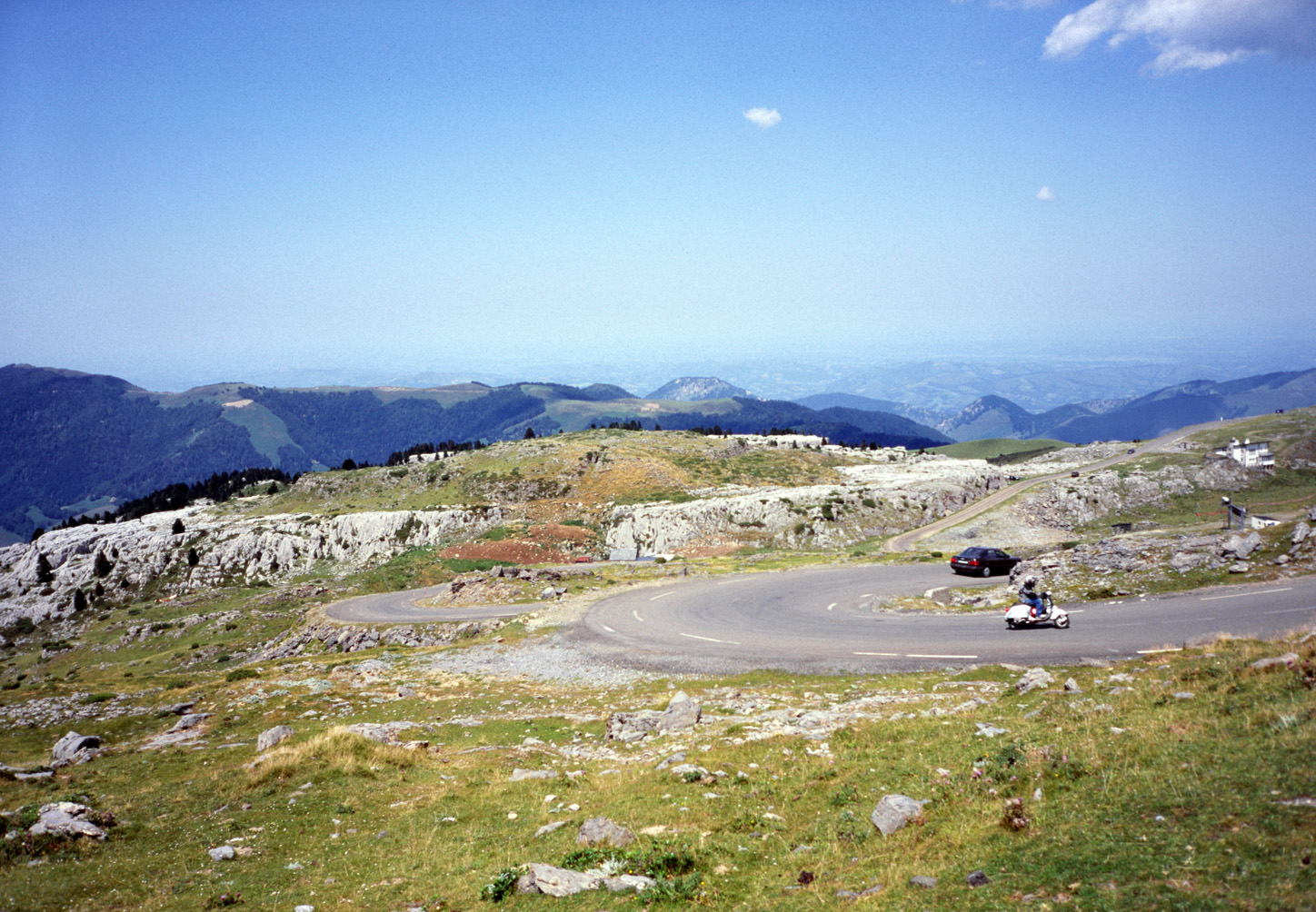
Col de la Pierre Saint Martin

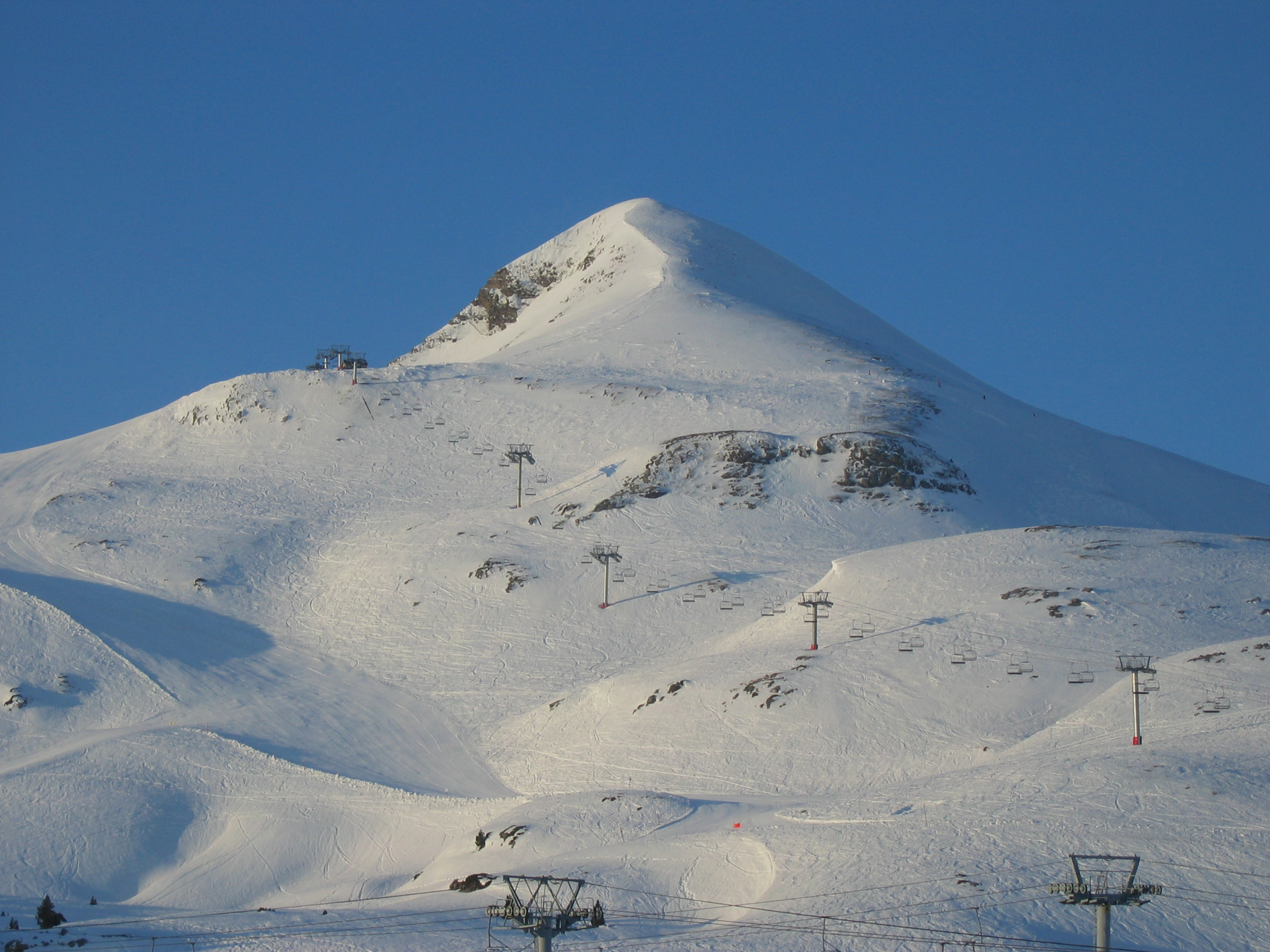
Arlas Peak

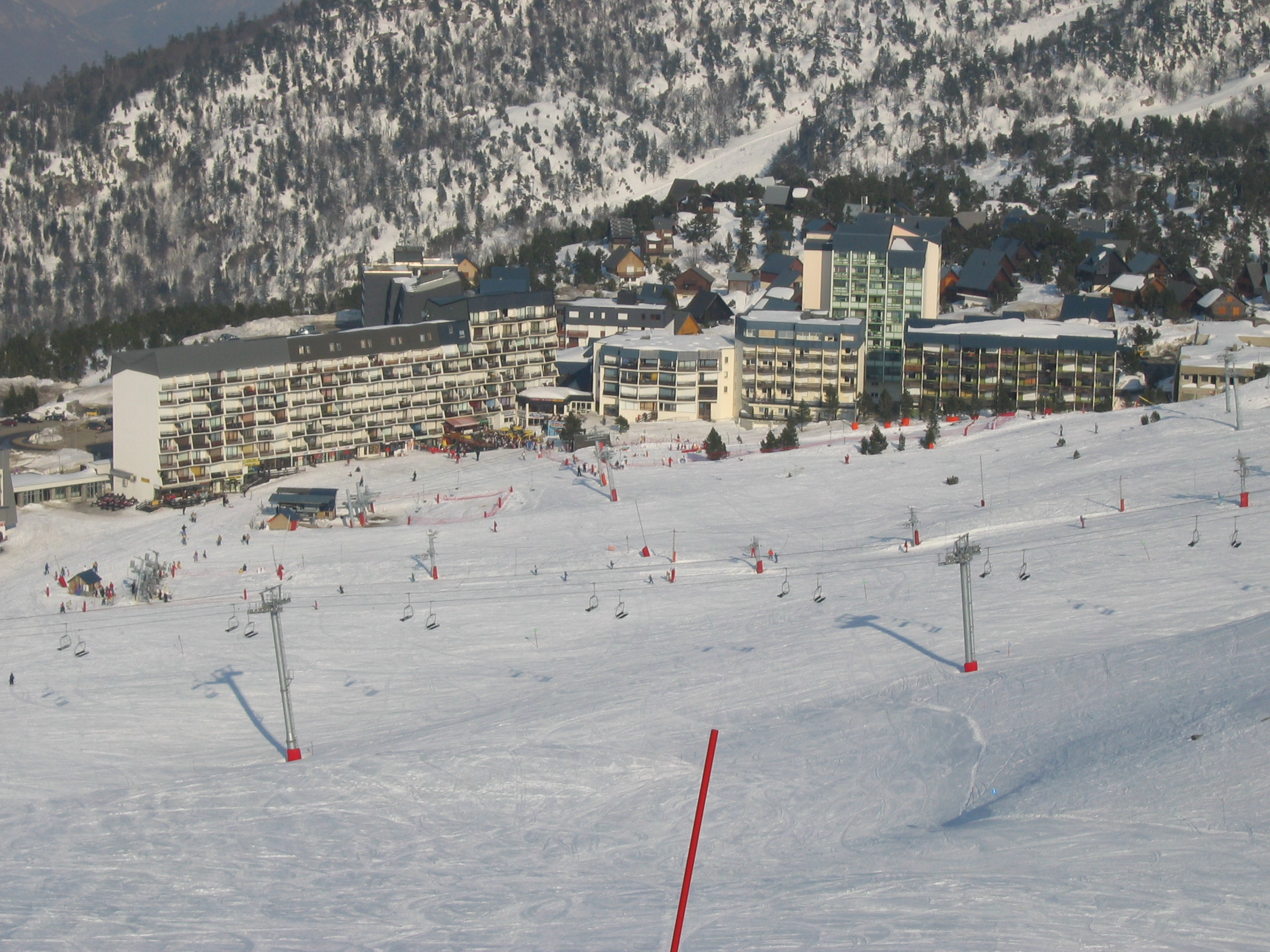
La Pierre Saint Martin Ski resort

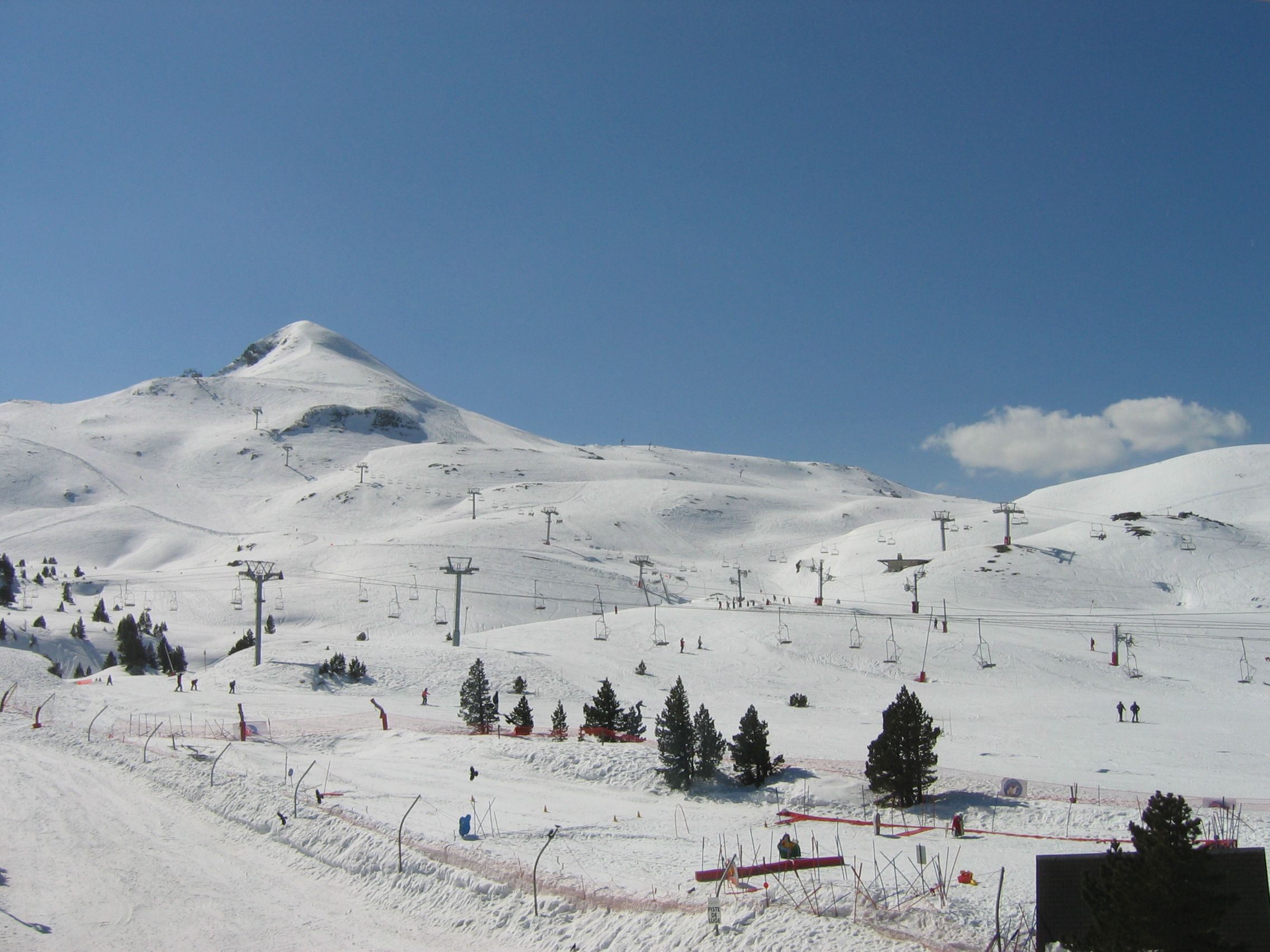
La Pierre Saint Martin ski slopes

== Facilities ==
=== Education ===
Arette has a public college: the College of Arette Barétous and a primary school.

=== Sports and sports facilities ===
The Basque pelota Club trains on the village fronton.

The town is located on the route of the 16th stage of the Tour de France 2007 which took place on 25 July. On Bastille Day 2015 the Tour will pass through the town again. 218 km route linked Orthez to Gourette - Col d'Aubisque.

The Hill-climbing event, organized since 1984, is listed as a championship of France.

== Notable people linked to the commune ==
- Jacques I d'Arette de Béarn-Bonasse, baptized around 1600 in Béarn and died in 1666 in Saint-Castin, was a lord of Bonasse and lay abbot of Arette.
- Henri Pellisson, Félibrige and member of the Escole Gastoû Febus affiliated to Félibrige (1846-1912), first at the Acadèmia dels Jòcs Florals (Academy of Floral Games) of Toulouse in 1898 for his poem Notre Dame de Sarrance.
- Renée Massip, born in 1907 at Arette and died in Paris in 2002, he was a French writer, winner of the Prix Interallié in 1963.
- Pierre Aristouy born on 18 October 1920 at Arette and died on 20 April 1974. A former French rugby player who played with the French team and in the Section Paloise in the position of second line or prop.
- Paul Ambille, born in 1930 at Béziers and died in 2010 in Arette, was a French painter.
- Nelson Paillou, president of the CNOSF (French Olympic Committee) lived in Arette.
- Marie Bourdet Well known cheese farmer in Southern France; Sonoma Valley communities

== See also ==
- Col de la Pierre St Martin
- GR 10 footpath
- Communes of the Pyrénées-Atlantiques department
