= Aspe Valley =

In the French Pyrenees

Coordinates: 42.9500°N 0.6000°W

The Aspe Valley (French: Vallée d'Aspe, pronounced [vale dasp]; Occitan: Vath d'Aspa) is a valley in the French part of the Pyrenees, department of Pyrénées-Atlantiques.

== Geography ==
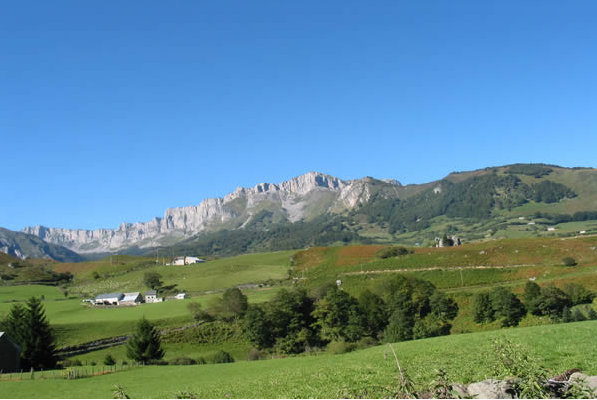
The valley in Lescun

It is one of the three valleys located in the historic region of upper Béarn, along with the Ossau Valley to the east and Barétous Valley to the west. The valley of Aspe stretches for 25 miles along the river Gave d'Aspe, roughly going from the town of Escot to the Spanish border where it meets the Aragon Valley, named after the Spanish river.

Thirteen towns, or communes, are established in the valley. From the north to the south, these are: Escot, Lourdios-Ichère, Sarrance, Bedous, Osse-en-Aspe, Aydius, Accous, Lées-Athas, Lescun, Cette-Eygun, Etsaut, Borce and Urdos.

== Language ==
The traditional dialect spoken in the valley is Gascon, a regional variety of Occitan language.

== History ==
The region has been invaded by many groups through its history: Moors, Romans, Germanic tribes, as well as kingdoms in Spain. In 1620, the sovereign state of Béarn, in which the valley was located, was annexed by the kingdom of France. During the Peninsular War in 1808, the troops of Napoleon passed through the valley while invading Spain.
