= Barétous Valley =

Valley in the French Pyrénées

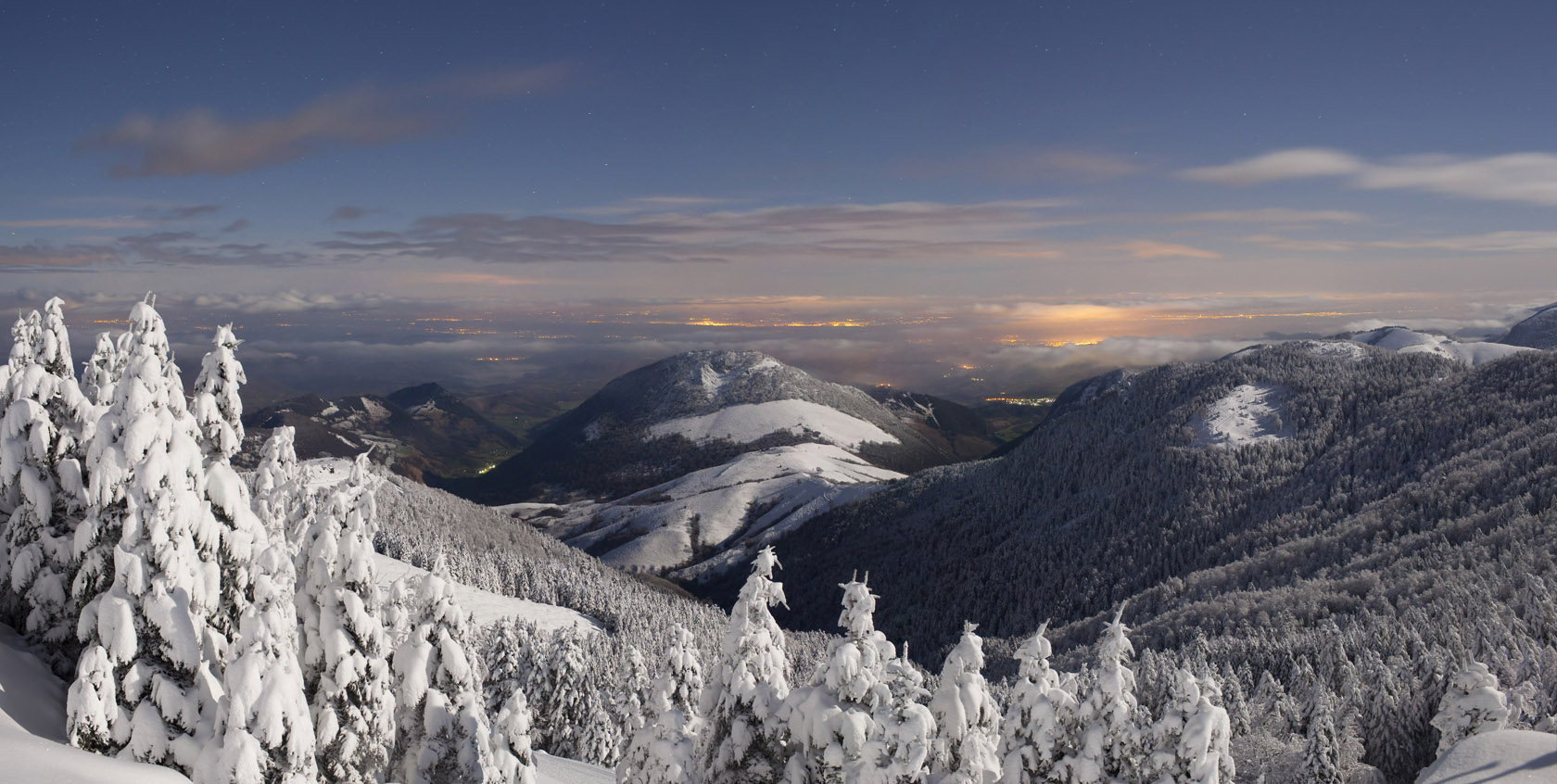
- The valley as seen from pic d'Issarbe.
- Length: 30 km (19 mi)

Naming
- Native name: Vallée de Barétous (French) (Note: Historically it has also been known as Baratos (1290, in the titles of Béarn), the land of Baretoos (1376, Béarn military watch), Varatoos (1385, censier for Béarn) and Barethous (1477, titles of the Aspe Valley).)

Geography
- Country: France
- State: Pyrénées-Atlantiques
- Region: Nouvelle-Aquitaine
- Population center: Aramits, Lanne-en-Barétous, Arette, Ance Féas
- Coordinates: 43°07′N 0°44′W
- River: Vert
- Interactive map of Barétous Valley

The Barétous or the Barétous Valley is a valley in the French Pyrénées, located in the Béarn in the Pyrénées-Atlantiques department.

Its name originates in 'vallatum' (Latin for 'small valley'), making 'Barétous valley' a pleonasm, as 'Barétous' on its own is sufficient. Paul Raymond also noted that in the 18th century Barétous was pronounced Barétons.

== Geography ==
Watered by the Arette Vert and the Barlanès Vert, which joined at the same elevation as Aramits to form the Vert, it is the westernmost of the three traditional Béarnaise valleys crossing the Pyrenees. It included the towns of Aramits, Lanne-en-Barétous, Arette and Ance Féas.

It is partly detached from the Aspe Valley and is the last French valley before the Basque country. It is connected to Haute-Navarre (Isaba, in the Roncal Valley) via the col de la Pierre Saint-Martin and ends at Oloron-Sainte-Marie.

== History ==
The Tribute of the Three Cows is a six-hundred-year-old agreement between French and Spanish shepherds, renewed every year in a ceremony on 13 July at la Pierre Saint-Martin where the shepherds swear concord and mutual aid.

In 1385 the valley was part of the bailiwick of Oloron.

== External links (in French) ==
- Barétous Valley Tourist Office
- Office de tourisme de la vallée de Barétous en version hiver avec la station de la Pierre Saint-Martin
