= Vert (river) =

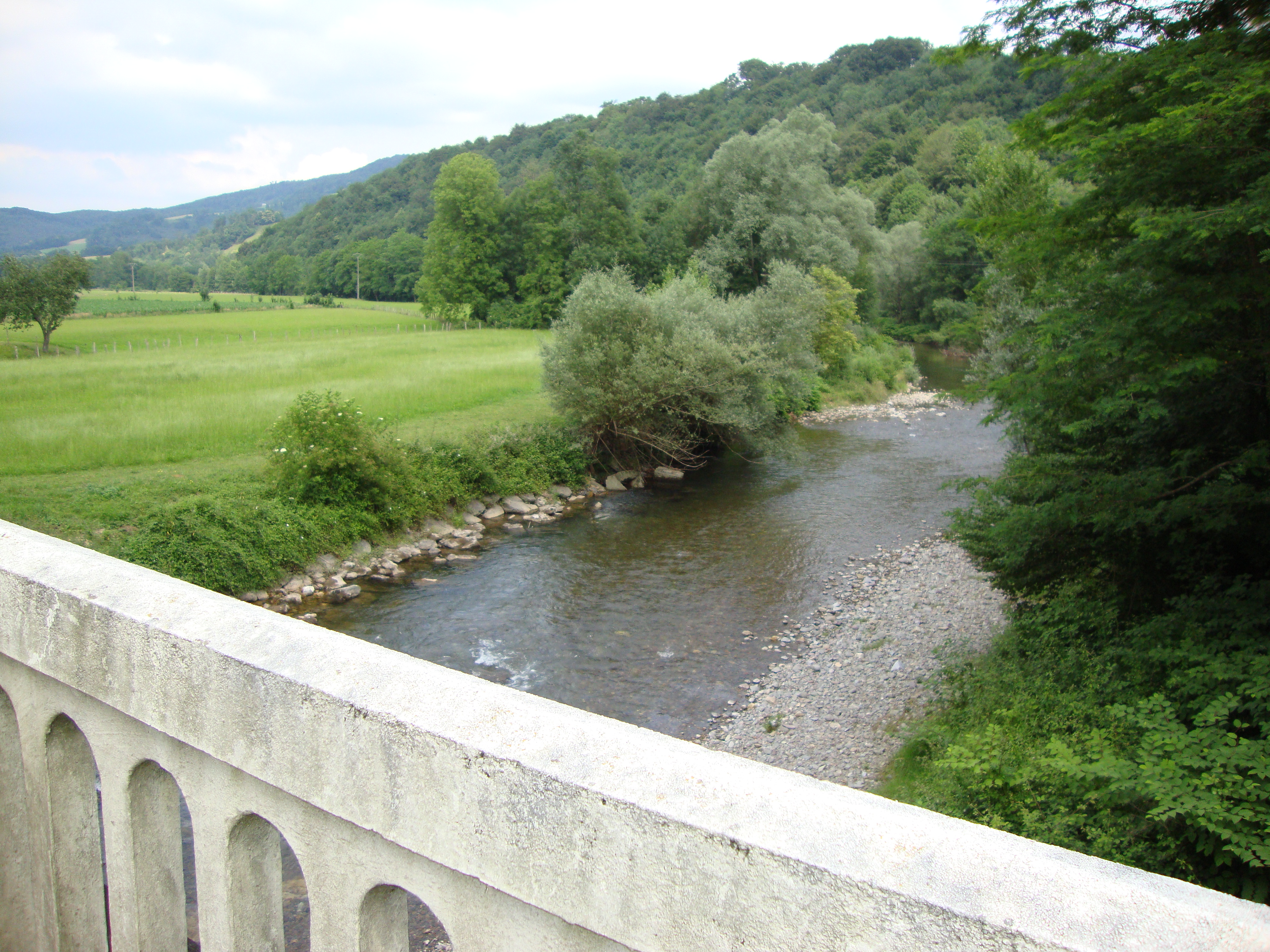

- Location within France Location within Nouvelle-Aquitaine

Location
- Country: France

Physical characteristics
- Source
  - location: Barétous
- Mouth
  - location: Gave d'Oloron
  - coordinates: 43°13′15″N 0°39′16″W
- Length: 35 km (22 mi)

Basin features
- Progression: Gave d'Oloron→ Gaves réunis→ Adour→ Atlantic Ocean

The Vert is a left tributary of the Gave d'Oloron, that drains the Barétous in the High-Béarn (Pyrénées-Atlantiques), in the Southwest of France. It flows into the Gave d'Oloron in Moumour, downstream from Oloron-Sainte-Marie. It is 35.0 km (21.7 mi) long.

Vert means 'green' in French, but the river name, Bert in 1467, is related to the Gascon word barta that means 'floodplain'.

The Vert is formed in Aramits from the confluence of:

- (R) the Vert d'Arette, Larron in 1589, from the Chousse Plateau, below the Pic de Guillers, elevation 1,597 metres (5,240 ft),
- (L) the Vert de Barlanès, from Issarbe and Lanne-en-Barétous.
