= Aramits =

- Commune
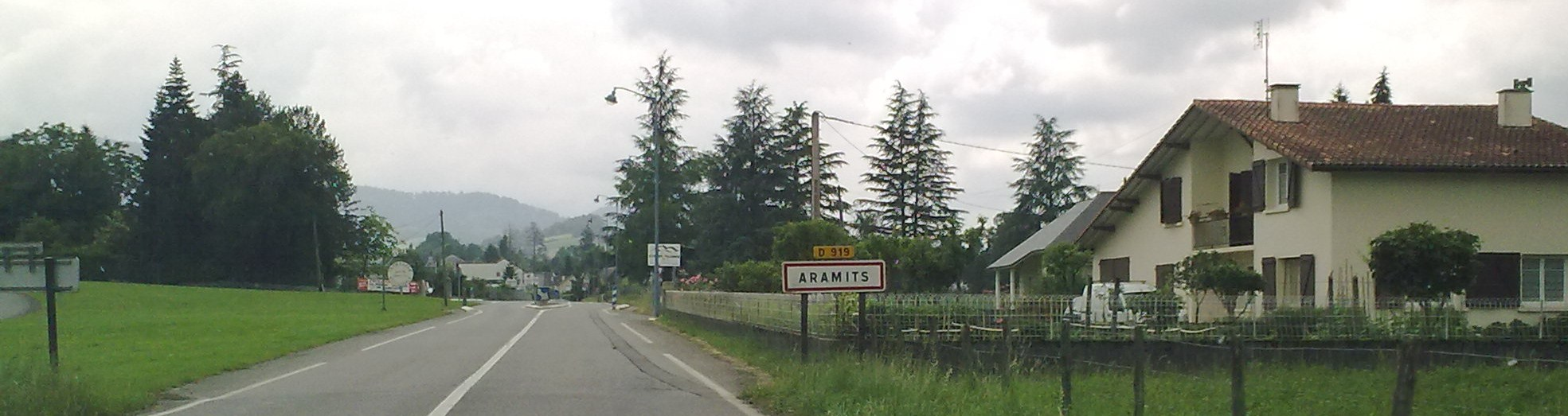
- Entry to Aramits

- Coat of arms
- Location of Aramits
- Location within France Location within Nouvelle-Aquitaine
- Coordinates: 43°07′18″N 0°43′34″W
- Country: France
- Region: Nouvelle-Aquitaine
- Department: Pyrénées-Atlantiques
- Arrondissement: Oloron-Sainte-Marie
- Canton: Oloron-Sainte-Marie-1

Government
  - Mayor (2023–2026): Jean-François Casaux
- Area^{1}: 29.55 km^{2} (11.41 sq mi)
- Highest elevation: 628 m (2,060 ft)
- Lowest elevation: 212 m (696 ft)
- Population (2023): 659
  - Density: 22.3/km^{2} (57.8/sq mi)
- Time zone: UTC+01:00 (CET)
  - Summer (DST): UTC+02:00 (CEST)
- INSEE/Postal code: 64029 /64570
- ^{1} French Land Register data, which excludes lakes, ponds, glaciers > 1 km^{2} (0.386 sq mi or 247 acres) and river estuaries.

Aramits (French pronunciation: [aʁamits]; Occitan: Aràmits; Basque: Aramitze) is a commune in the Pyrénées-Atlantiques department in the Nouvelle-Aquitaine region of south-western France.

== Geography ==
=== Location ===
Aramits is located in part of the Barétous Valley, the westernmost of the three main valleys of Béarn crossing the Pyrenees. It is located some 15 km south-west of Oloron-Sainte-Marie and 3 km north of Arette.

=== Access ===
Access is by the D919 road from Ance in the north-east to the village then continuing to Lanne-en-Baretous in the south-west. There are also the minor roads D659 from the village north to join the D159 on the northern border and the D133 which goes south from the village to Arette.

Bus route 848 of the Inter-urban network of Pyrénées-Atlantiques, which connects La Pierre Saint-Martin (a ski resort in Arette) to Oloron-Sainte-Marie, has a stop in Aramits.

=== Hydrography ===
Located in the drainage basin of the Adour, the commune is bisected from south-west to north-east by : Le Vert a tributary of the Gave d'Oloron which gathers many tributaries of its own in the commune including the Aurone, the Lancy, the Littos, the Talou Gros, and also by the arrècs of Bugalaran, Bitole (as well its tributary the Rachet), Ibarcis, and Labaigt (and by its tributary the Audore).

The tributaries of the Joos: the Arriou de Sulu and the Bouhatéko erreka (with the Dragon) also flow through the commune.

=== Localities and hamlets ===
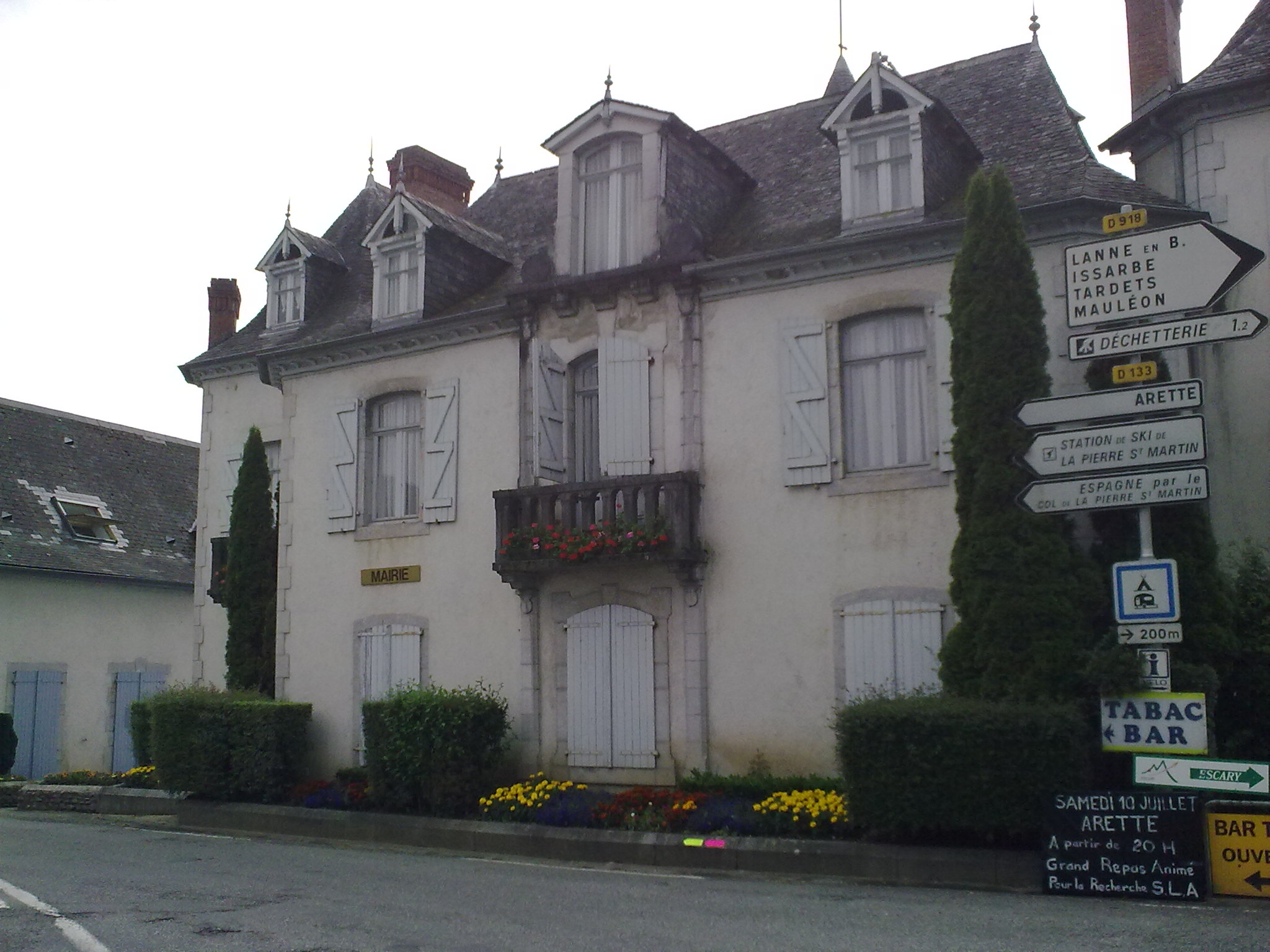
The Town Hall.

- Aïtzaguer
- Andillon
- Arhanchet
- Aripe
- Atchouètos
- Badet
- Balen
- Baliros
- Villa Barétous
- Bénébig
- Bernasqué
- Bigué
- Bile
- Bouenou
- Bourette
- Brincou
- Fontaine Bugalaran
- Bois de Bugangue
- Borde Estanguet
- Granges Cachau
- Calangué
- Camou
- Capdeville
- Carquet
- Carrère
- Casabonne
- Casalet
- Casemayou
- Castera
- Chandelle
- Chicane
- Chinaberry
- Chourrout
- Coig
- Coig de Lamothe
- Couéchot
- Coustarou
- Crapuchette
- Escary
- Escoubès
- Escribasse
- Estrate
- Galard
- Garay
- La Gloriette
- Gouloume
- Gourroure
- Guirail
- Hondeville
- Laborde
- Lac de Bas
- Lacazette
- Lacouère
- Lagarde
- Lahitte
- Lamothe (2 localities)
- Lanne de Haut
- Lanneretonne
- Larrande
- Lartigau
- Laserre
- Laude Bousquet
- Grange Lerdou
- Lesponne
- Lhande
- Loustalot
- Loustaucaus
- Grange de Lurbet
- Mendioudou
- Ménin
- Mesplou
- Miapira
- Miramon
- Mirande
- Moncole
- Mounolou
- Les Murs
- Olivé de Haut
- Olivé de Baig
- Oscamou
- Grange d'Osse
- Ounces
- Oyhenard
- Pastou
- Les Pernes
- Peyré
- Grange de Pradet
- Prat
- Bois de Rachet
- Pont de Rachou
- Ripaète
- Satzoury
- Serres
- Serreuille
- Sottou
- Soulou
- Talou
- Talou Andichou
- Talou Piarroch
- Tembla de la Loupère
- Tos de Haut
- Trébucq
- Les Trois Arbres

== Toponymy ==
The commune name in béarnais is Aràmits (according to classical norm of Occitan). For Brigitte Jobbé-Duval, the origin of the name is from the Basque aran ("valley") and -itz (a locative and collective suffix) giving "place of valleys" or "confluence". It would also indicate that the inhabitants were once nicknamed grenouilles (frogs) - a name for the inhabitants of wetlands).

The following table details the origins of the commune name and other names in the commune.

Name	Spelling	Date	Source	Page	Origin	Description
Aramits	Aramiçs	1270	Raymond	7	Ossau	Village
	Aramitz en Baratons	1376	Raymond	7	Luntz	
	Iramitz	1383	Raymond	7	Luntz	
	Sent-Vinsens d'Aramitz	1606	Raymond	7	Insinuations	
	Aramys	1630	Grosclaude		Le Païs de Béarn Map	
	Aramits	1750	Cassini			
L'Arrigau	lo ariu aperat la Rigau	1538	Raymond	12	Reformation	Stream with its source in Arette and joining the Vert in Aramits
	L'Arrigas	1863	Raymond			
Basques	Basques	1863	Raymond	22		Hamlet
La Bourette	La Bourette	1863	Raymond	35		Tributary of the Vert which rises in Aramits
Le Bois de Bugangue	lo boscq de Buyangue	1477	Raymond	37	Aspe	Wood on the territory of Asasp in 1863. The Ruisseau de Bugangue, a tributary of the Mielle which rose in Asasp and Gurmençon in 1863, passed through the wood.
Calangué	La Calangue	1863	Raymond	39		A Stream with its source in the Bois de Budangue and joining the Dandarou, a tributary of the Vert.
Gouloume	Goulomme	1863	Raymond	72		Wood
La Grange-d'Osse	L’Espitau d’Osse	1385	Raymond	73	Census	Farm next to the Vert belonging to Pontaut Abbey(Landes) and a fief of the Viscounts of Béarn depending on the bailiwick of Oloron.
	La Grange de Osse ab une petite gleysi	1538	Raymond	73	Reformation	
Lanne de Haut	Lane	1385	Raymond	92	Census	Close to another place in Aramits which is now in the commune of Lanne-en-Barétous. It had a Lay Abbey, vassal of the Viscounts of Béarn. In 1385 it was part of the bailiwick of Oloron and had 17 fires.
	Lana	1444	Raymond	92	Cour Majour	
	Sanctus Martinus de Lanne	1673	Raymond	92	Insinuations	
	Lanne	1863	Raymond	92		
Olivé	Oliber	1538	Raymond	124	Reformation	Farm
Serreuille	Seruilhe	1376	Raymond	160	Military	Hamlet
	Sarrulhe-Susoo	1385	Raymond	160	Census	
	Sarrulhe-Jusoo	1385	Raymond	160	Census	
Soulou	Soulon	1581	Raymond	163	Reformation	Farm

Sources:

- Raymond: Topographic Dictionary of the Department of Basses-Pyrenees, 1863, on the page numbers indicated in the table. (in French)
- Grosclaude: Toponymic Dictionary of communes, Béarn, 2006 (in French)
- Cassini: Cassini Map from 1750

Origins:

- Ossau: Titles of the Ossau Valley
- Luntz:
- Insinuations: Insinuations of the Diocese of Oloron
- Aspe: Titles of the Aspe Valley
- Census: Census of Béarn
- Cour Majour: Regulations of the Cour Majour
- Military: Military Inspection of Béarn

== History ==
Paul Raymond on page 7 of his 1863 dictionary that Aramits is the former capital of the Barétous valley and that there were two Lay Abbeys, vassals of the Viscounts of Béarn: The Abadie-Susan and Abadie-Jusan.

He further noted that in 1385 there were 52 fires at Aramits and it depended on the bailiwick of Oloron.

Shortly before (in 1375), the priest of Aramits played the role of mediator in conflicts between the Navarrese and the Bearnese which gave birth to the treaty called the Junta de Roncal, leading to the yearly tribute of the three cows paid by Aramits to Isaba (Spain).

In 1790, the Canton of Aramits also included Esquiule.

On 13 March 2000 Aramits was hit by an earthquake of magnitude 4.2.

=== Heraldry ===
Arms of Aramits	Blazon: Vert, two swords Argent saltirewise points to base surmounted by a musketeer's hat of Sable feathered in Argent.

== Administration ==
List of Successive Mayors

From	To	Name
1983	1989	Pierre Louis
1989	2014	Daniel Lourtau
2014	2023	Étienne Serna
2023	current	Jean-François Casaux

=== Inter-communality ===
Aramits is part of five inter-communal structures:

- The Communauté de communes du Haut Béarn;
- The SIVU for Tourism in Haute-Soule and Barétous;
- The SIVU La Verna;
- The Energy Association for Pyrénées-Atlantiques;
- The Intercommunal association for study and management of the watershed of Le Vert and its tributaries.

== Demography ==
The inhabitants of the commune are known as Aramitsiens or Aramitsiennes in French.

Historical population

Year	Pop.	±% p.a.
1793	1,024	—
1800	938	−1.25%
1806	1,001	+1.09%
1821	1,220	+1.33%
1831	1,264	+0.35%
1836	1,317	+0.82%
1841	1,303	−0.21%
1846	1,306	+0.05%
1851	1,249	−0.89%
1856	1,209	−0.65%
1861	1,150	−1.00%
1866	1,073	−1.38%
1872	1,024	−0.78%
1876	1,040	+0.39%
1881	1,110	+1.31%
1886	1,031	−1.47%
1891	962	−1.38%
1896	986	+0.49%
1901	953	−0.68%

Year	Pop.	±% p.a.
1906	953	+0.00%
1911	940	−0.27%
1921	796	−1.65%
1926	766	−0.77%
1931	753	−0.34%
1936	740	−0.35%
1946	697	−0.60%
1954	642	−1.02%
1962	622	−0.39%
1968	600	−0.60%
1975	621	+0.49%
1982	602	−0.44%
1990	588	−0.29%
1999	653	+1.17%
2007	667	+0.27%
2012	678	+0.33%
2017	669	−0.27%
2023	659	−0.25%

Source: EHESS and INSEE

== Economy ==
The economy of the town is primarily oriented toward agriculture and livestock (cattle and sheep). It is part of the Appellation d'origine contrôlée (AOC) zone designation of Ossau-iraty.

== Culture and Heritage ==
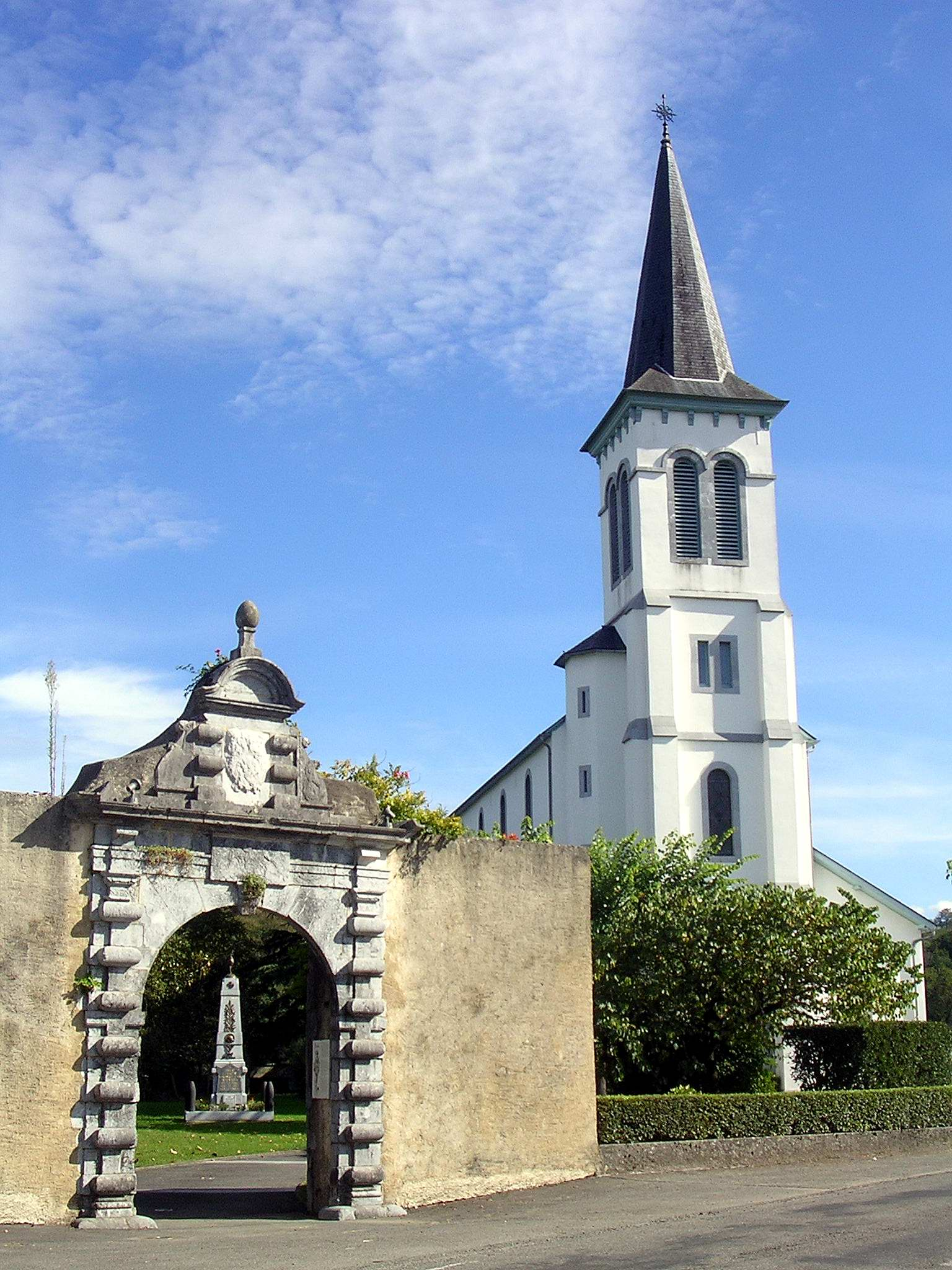
Church and entrance to the old Lay Abbey

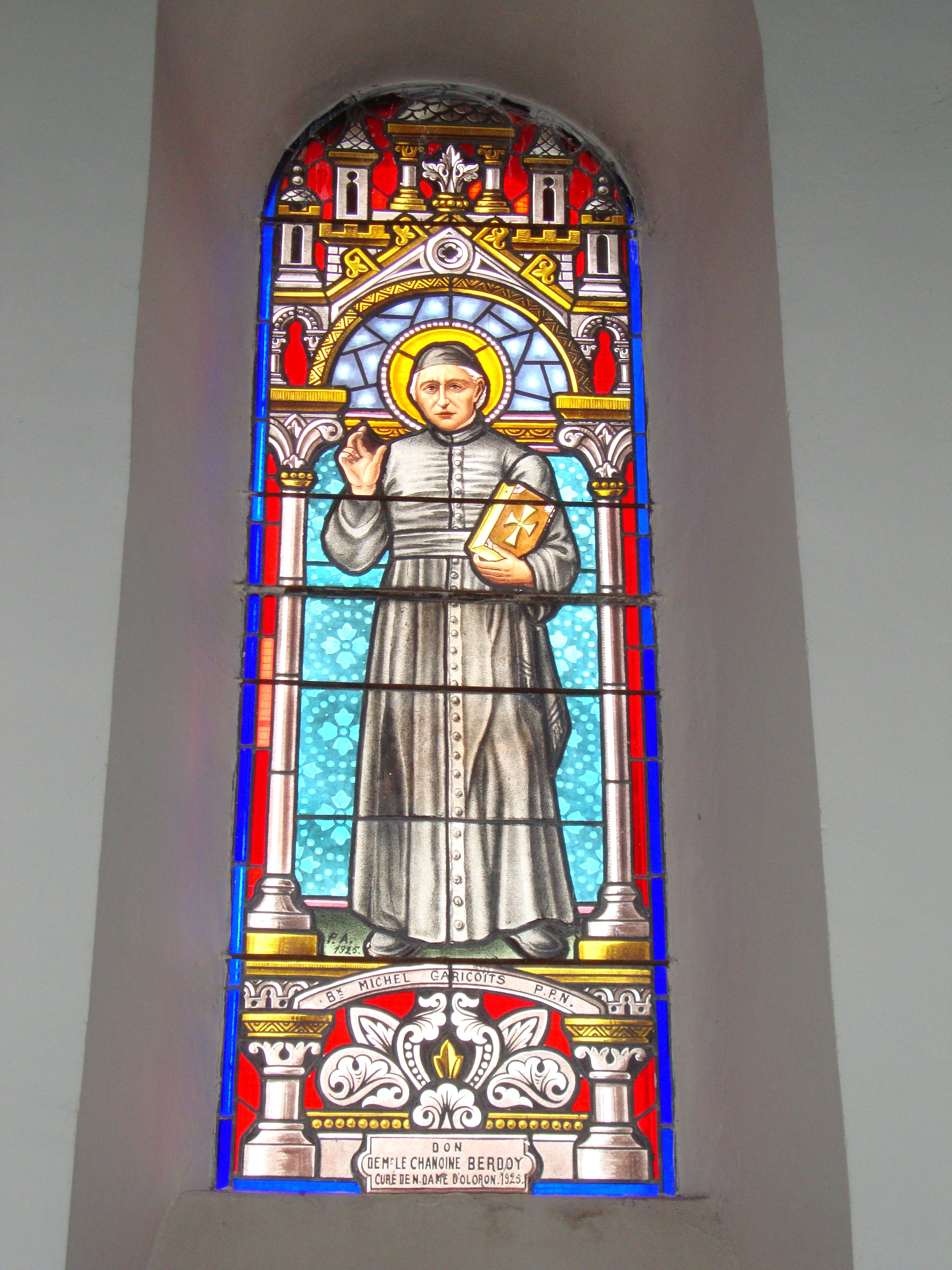
Stained glass by Michel Garicoïts at Aramits

=== Religious heritage ===
The Parish church of Saint-Vincent (17th century) is registered as an historical monument. It was a former Lay Abbey with the remains of a portal from the 17th century but the old church was demolished in 1880. The new Romanesque-Byzantine style church was built from 1884 to 1886.

=== Environmental heritage ===
- The Sommet de Souek is 623 metres high
- The Soum d'Unars is 604 metres
- The Barrat de Sottou is 556 metres.

== Facilities ==
=== Education ===
The commune has a primary school.

=== Sports and sports facilities ===
Rugby Union: the Entente Aramits plays in Fédérale 2. Pierre Capdevielle played there from 1985 to 1994.

== Notable people linked to the commune ==
- Henri d'Aramitz lived in the commune. He was the son of Charles Aramitz and a sergeant in the company of musketeers who was the inspiration for Aramis in the novels The Three Musketeers, Twenty Years After and The Vicomte de Bragelonne by Alexandre Dumas.

== See also ==
- Communes of the Pyrénées-Atlantiques department
