= Escot, Pyrénées-Atlantiques =

Escot
- Commune
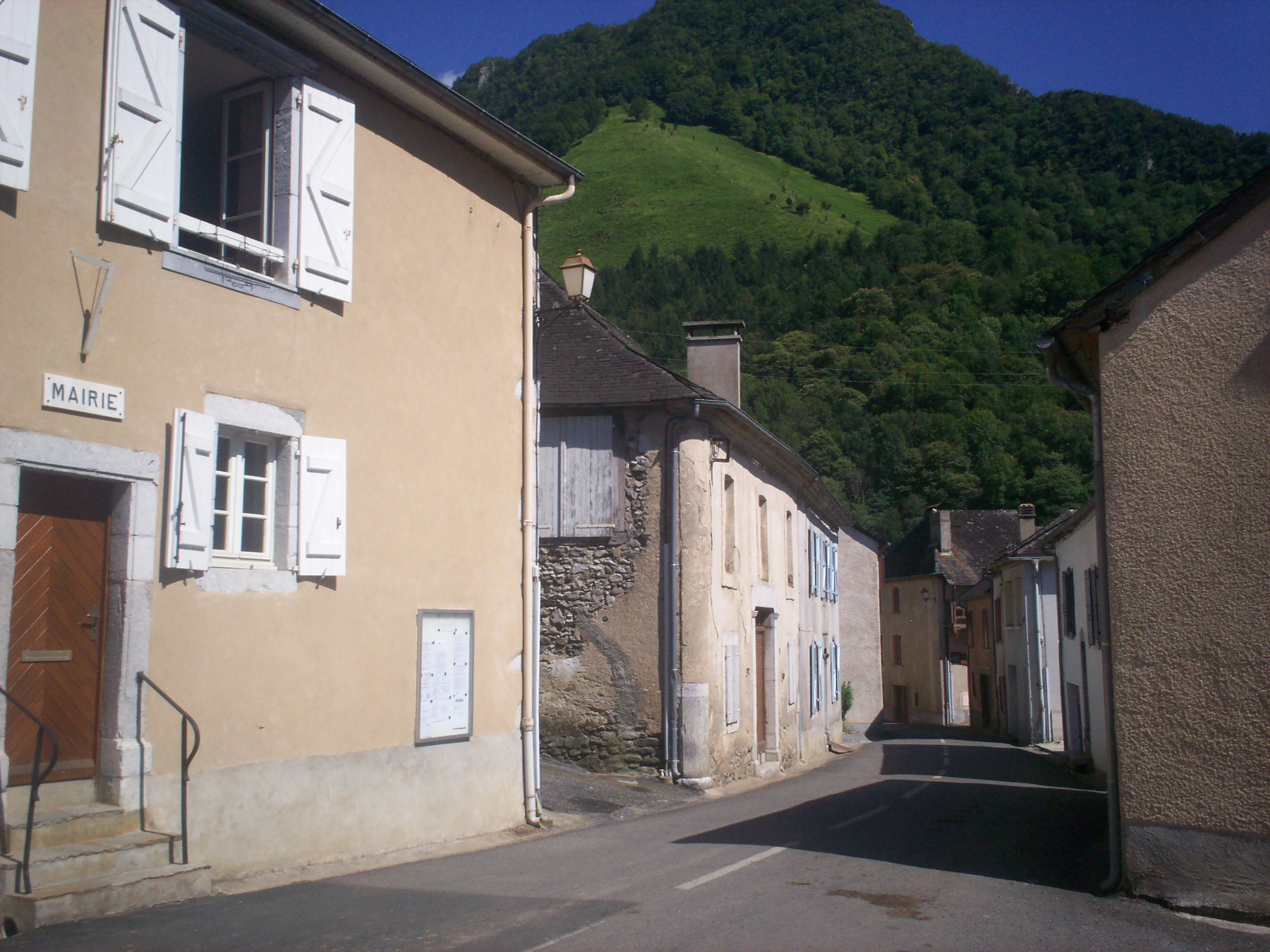
- Town Hall
- Location of Escot
- Location within France Location within Nouvelle-Aquitaine
- Coordinates: 43°04′39″N 0°36′18″W
- Country: France
- Region: Nouvelle-Aquitaine
- Department: Pyrénées-Atlantiques
- Arrondissement: Oloron-Sainte-Marie
- Canton: Oloron-Sainte-Marie-1
- Intercommunality: Haut Béarn

Government
  - Mayor (2020–2026): Alain Camsusou
- Area^{1}: 22.66 km^{2} (8.75 sq mi)
- Highest elevation: 1,817 m (5,961 ft)
- Lowest elevation: 290 m (950 ft)
- Population (2023): 118
  - Density: 5.21/km^{2} (13.5/sq mi)
- Time zone: UTC+01:00 (CET)
  - Summer (DST): UTC+02:00 (CEST)
- INSEE/Postal code: 64206 /64490
- ^{1} French Land Register data, which excludes lakes, ponds, glaciers > 1 km^{2} (0.386 sq mi or 247 acres) and river estuaries.

Escot (Occitan: Escota) is a commune in the Pyrénées-Atlantiques department in south-western France.

== See also ==
- Communes of the Pyrénées-Atlantiques department
