= Lay Abbey =

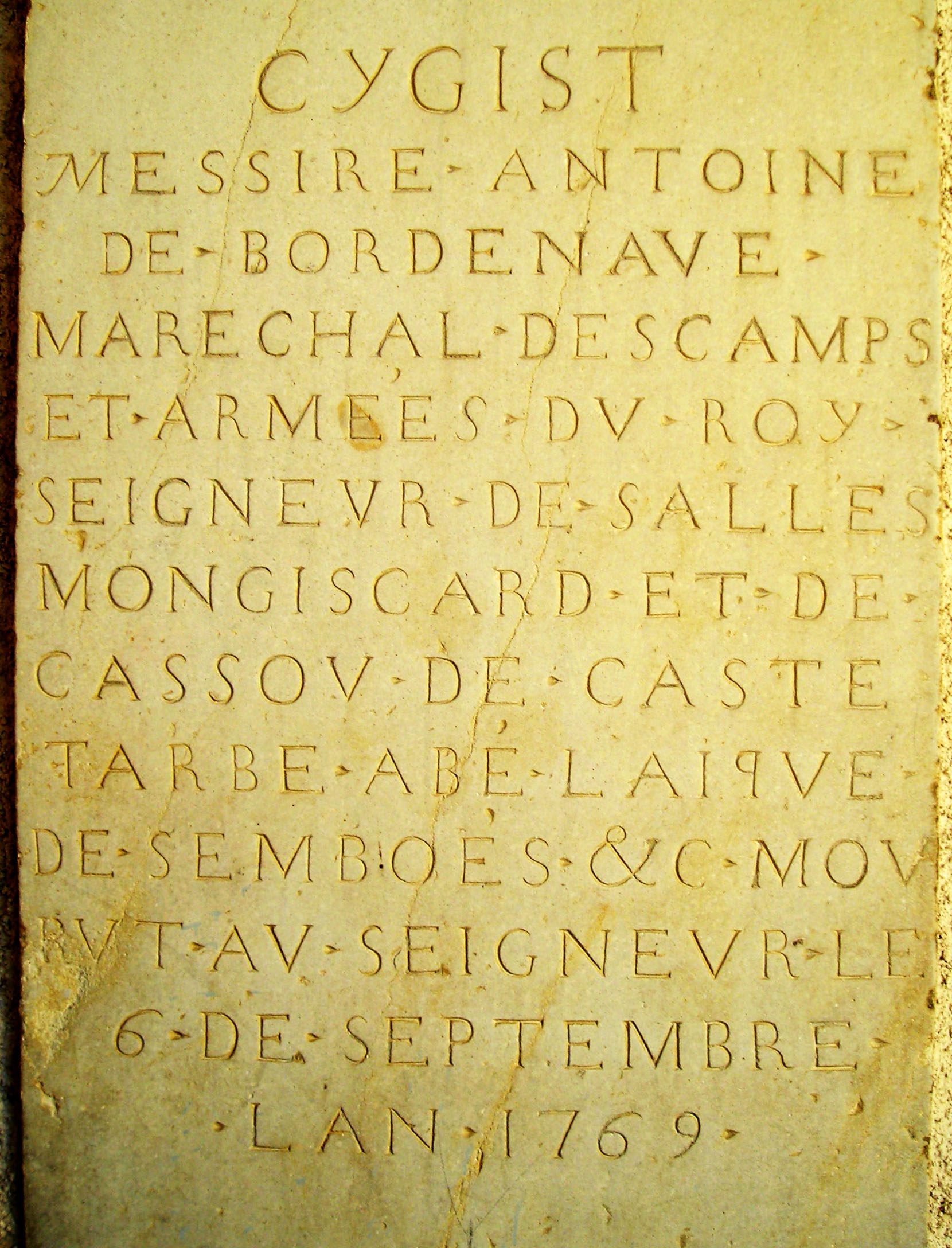
Tombstone of Saint-Boès (64) showing the name of a Lay Abbey

A Lay Abbey (Fr: Abbaye laïque) was a basic component of the Middle Ages in the western foothills of the northern Pyrenees. The adjective lay indicated that the property did not belong to a religious order. It is possible to identify a hundred lay abbeys, some only by conjecture due to the disappearance of the texts.

== Introduction ==
The founding principle was the creation of a parish by a lord or even by a large farmer, sometimes very small, in order to tithe, so that he could maintain a church.

Although he was not a member of the church, the lord called himself Father (L'abbé in French or L'abat in Basque), a term appearing in the 11th century. The meaning of "father", came from the Latin abbas or abbatus which came from the Hebrew abba.

The Father's house was distinctive, often called the abadia (Basque for abbey) and was to a certain extent the foundation of a parish.

Considering that a tithe is one tenth of the income, only thirty farms were sufficient to build a viable lay abbey.

== Geographical location ==
Lay abbeys existed mainly in the Béarn, the Bigorre and their margins. To the west, the Soule (Basque Country), to the north Chalosse and the Tursan, then south to Armagnac, the Astarac, and the Adour valley. Overall, the inner basin of the Adour. Practically, there were no lay abbeys beyond. (Nevertheless, Canon Ulysse Chevalier wrote on "lay abbeys and the presence of Roman towns under the consuls" in 1882).

== History ==
According to the assumptions made based on the theses of Pierre de Marca these foundations followed the Carolingian Empire, when Islam was approaching the Pyrenees. Faced with the threat of invasion, illustrated by the Viking incursions into the Adour in the 9th century, the church tolerated these foundations that allowed it to establish its presence in areas of recent or uncertain evangelization.

This interpretation is discussed by modern historians and archeo-geographers. They see local customs of tithe distribution continuing in this form; the customs may be related to ancient Aquitains or proto-Basques in territories where feudalism was recent.

Some lay abbeys became successful, with powerful lords, others remained modest parishes, or sometimes fell into disuse and were taken over by monastic abbeys, such as the Abbey of Saint-Jean de Sorde for example.

In the late Middle Ages, many conflicts occurred with the Church who saw itself deprived of income while no longer weighing the threat of Islam. It was the same in Dauphiné, freed from the Saracens and the Normans in 975, then living a period of feudal anarchy detrimental to ecclesiastical lordships until the end of the 12th century and the arrival of reforming bishops.

There may be two or more lay abbeys in one commune.

== In Béarn ==
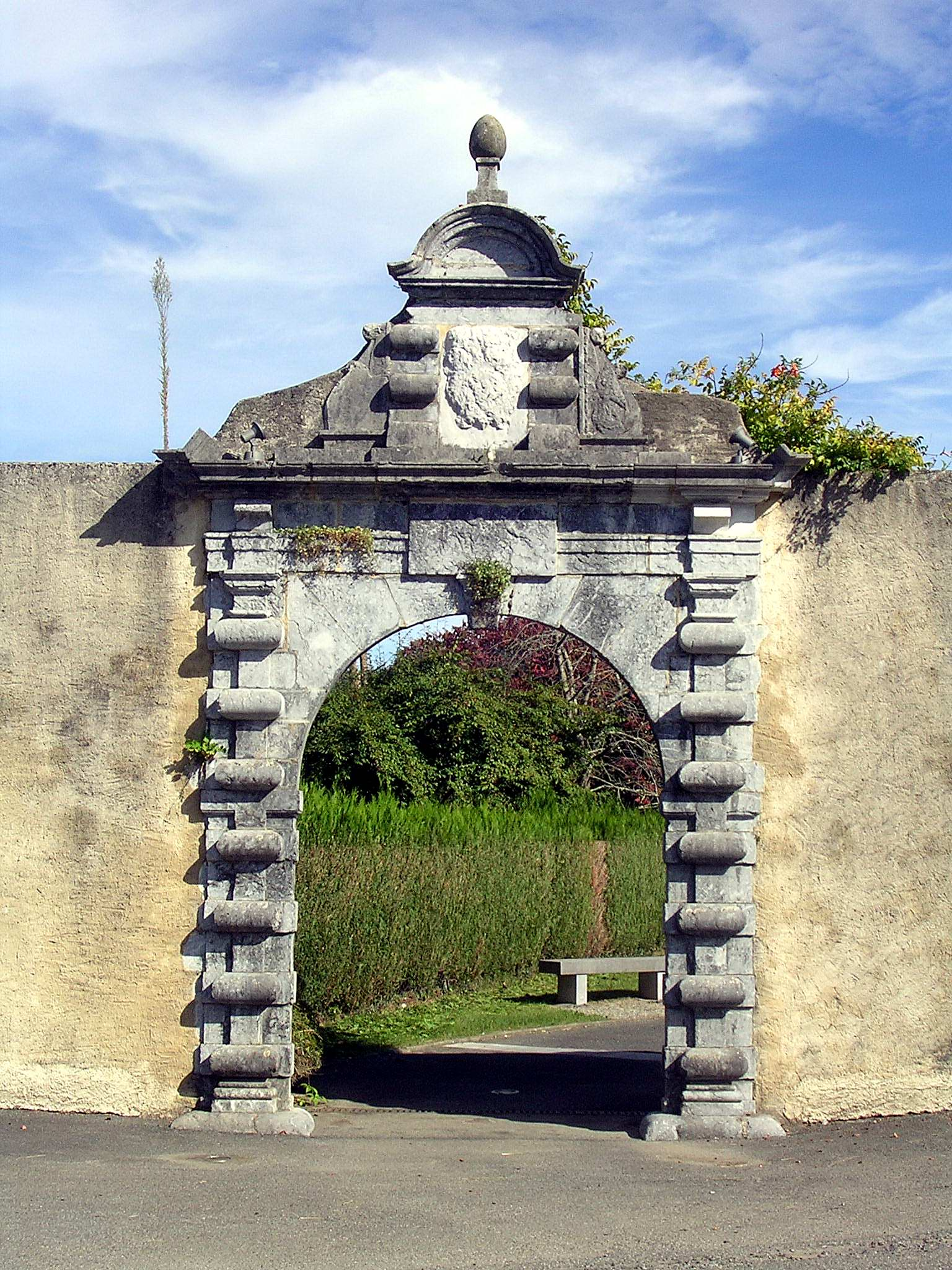
The Doorway, the last vestige of the lay abbey of Aramits

In old Béarn a lay abbey was entitled to an income or religious rights to be held by a lay priest and which was transmitted to his descendants. Some of these abbeys were also allowed to confer nobility on their owner. This was the case, for example, of the lay abbey of Aramits, built in "domengeadure", that is to say as a noble house by Gaston Phoebus around 1376. The Aramits family, whose spelling varied over time (Aramis, Aramitz) remained owners of the area until the day the son of the famous musketeer immortalized by Alexandre Dumas sold it to a cousin.

== In literature ==
It is common to confuse "Father of the clergy" and "Father priest" Alexandre Dumas was no exception with his character Aramis in The Three Musketeers. A facsimile of Henry Aramitz, he is a Father, a religious priest, or a bishop. The model of his character was a lay priest and even Protestant. Marie of Aramitz was the sister of Charles Aramitz, his father and she was the wife of Jean Peyrer who was another lay priest (Trois Villes). From this union was born Jean-Armand du Peyrer the famous Count of Troisville. According to Paul Raymond, there were two Aramits lay abbeys: the Abadie-Susan and Abadie-Jusan.

== Onomastics ==
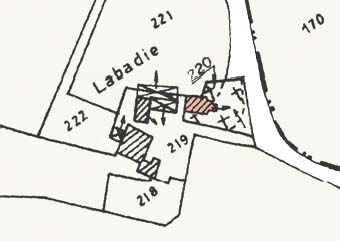
The Church of Sunarthe at Sauveterre-de-Béarn, in red on the plan, near a house called Labadie

In the absence of cartularies, burrows or notaries, it is possible to distinguish some secular abbeys by indications, such as a church in the countryside, away from the village and sometimes flanked by a large house often called Labadie on maps. There are also Castèth or Lassalle (place or fortified house). In some cases, there are fortified churches, formed in part with a tower, or a gatehouse which has been a home.

The name Abadie and its derivatives Labadie, Dabadie, and Labadiole is the most common surname currently in the Hautes-Pyrenees, while there is the surname Aphatie found in la Soule.
