= Osse-en-Aspe =

- Commune
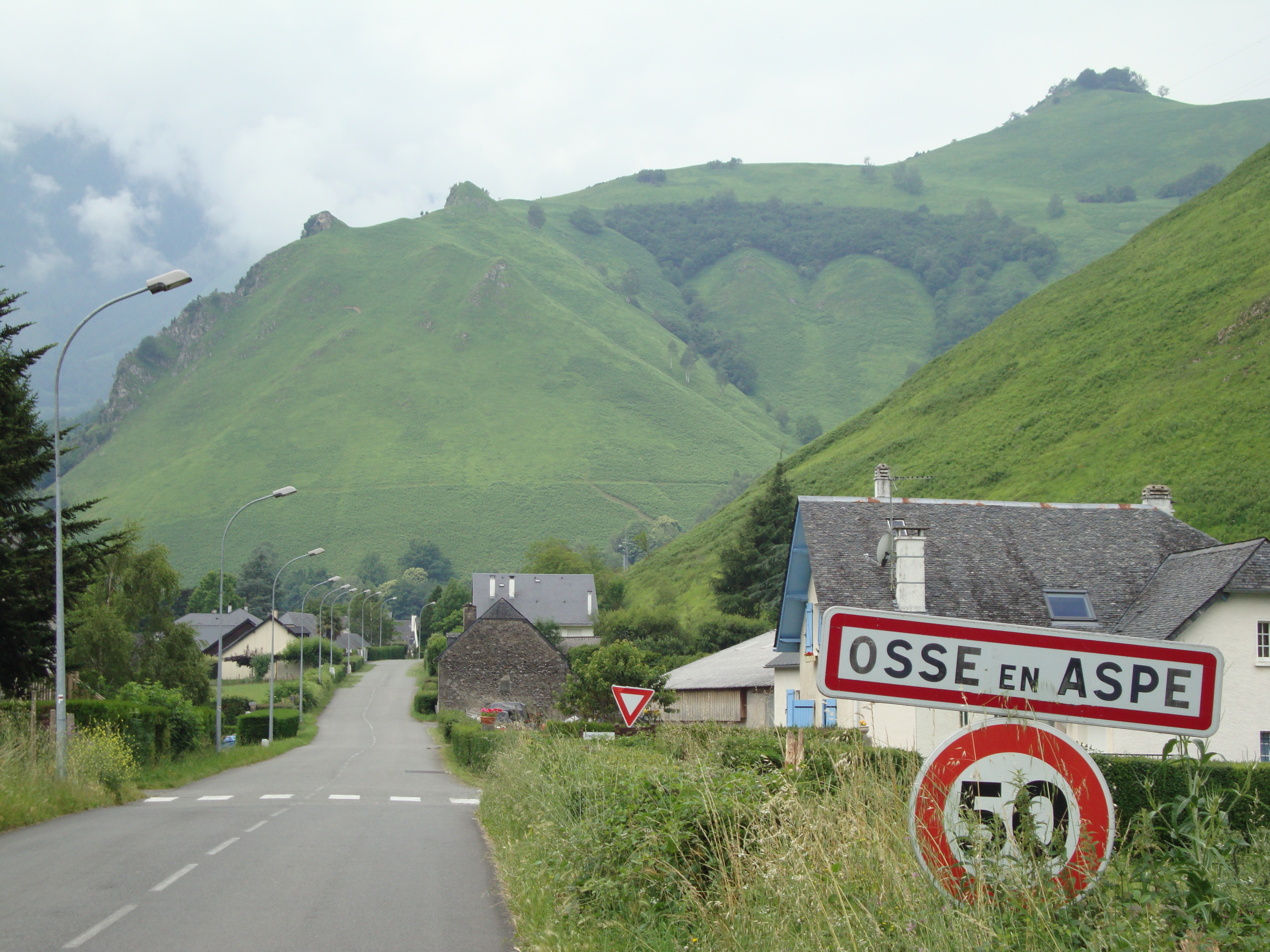
- The road into Osse-en-Aspe
- Location of Osse-en-Aspe
- Location within France Location within Nouvelle-Aquitaine
- Coordinates: 42°59′47″N 0°36′58″W
- Country: France
- Region: Nouvelle-Aquitaine
- Department: Pyrénées-Atlantiques
- Arrondissement: Oloron-Sainte-Marie
- Canton: Oloron-Sainte-Marie-1
- Intercommunality: Haut Béarn

Government
  - Mayor (2020–2026): Gérard Burs
- Area^{1}: 43.03 km^{2} (16.61 sq mi)
- Highest elevation: 1,760 m (5,770 ft)
- Lowest elevation: 375 m (1,230 ft)
- Population (2023): 330
  - Density: 7.7/km^{2} (20/sq mi)
- Time zone: UTC+01:00 (CET)
  - Summer (DST): UTC+02:00 (CEST)
- INSEE/Postal code: 64433 /64490
- ^{1} French Land Register data, which excludes lakes, ponds, glaciers > 1 km^{2} (0.386 sq mi or 247 acres) and river estuaries.

Osse-en-Aspe (French pronunciation: [ɔs ɑ̃n‿asp], literally Osse in Aspe; Occitan: Òussa) is a commune in the Pyrénées-Atlantiques department in south-western France.

== See also ==
- Communes of the Pyrénées-Atlantiques department
