= Lées-Athas =

- Commune
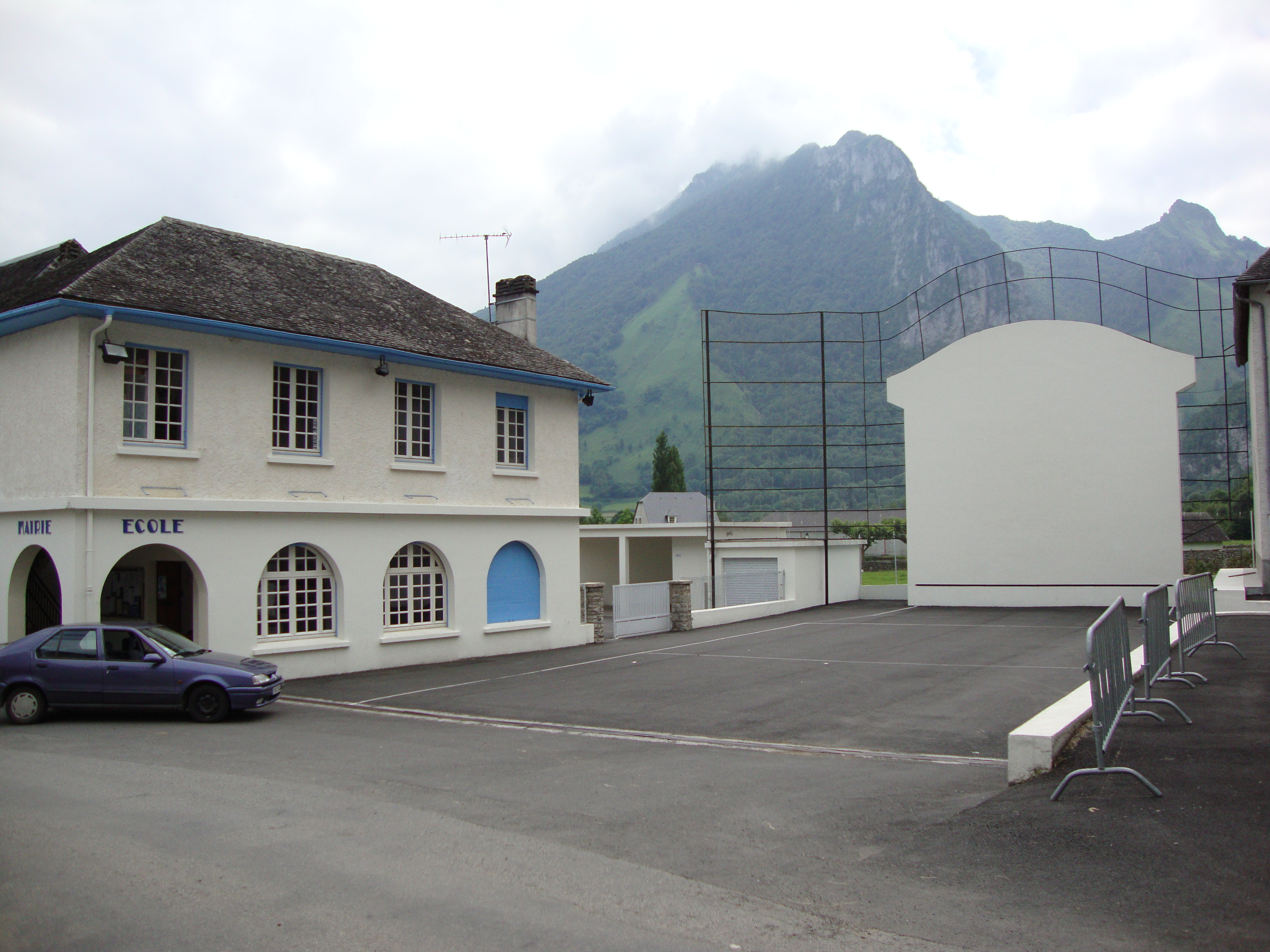
- Town Hall
- Location of Lées-Athas
- Location within France Location within Nouvelle-Aquitaine
- Coordinates: 42°58′32″N 0°37′14″W
- Country: France
- Region: Nouvelle-Aquitaine
- Department: Pyrénées-Atlantiques
- Arrondissement: Oloron-Sainte-Marie
- Canton: Oloron-Sainte-Marie-1
- Intercommunality: Haut Béarn

Government
  - Mayor (2020–2026): Patrick Maunas
- Area^{1}: 44.81 km^{2} (17.30 sq mi)
- Highest elevation: 2,503 m (8,212 ft)
- Lowest elevation: 417 m (1,368 ft)
- Population (2023): 229
  - Density: 5.11/km^{2} (13.2/sq mi)
- Time zone: UTC+01:00 (CET)
  - Summer (DST): UTC+02:00 (CEST)
- INSEE/Postal code: 64330 /64490
- ^{1} French Land Register data, which excludes lakes, ponds, glaciers > 1 km^{2} (0.386 sq mi or 247 acres) and river estuaries.

Lées-Athas (French pronunciation: [lezatas]; Occitan: Tira) is a commune in the Pyrénées-Atlantiques department in south-western France.

== See also ==
- Communes of the Pyrénées-Atlantiques department
