= Lanne-en-Barétous =

- Commune
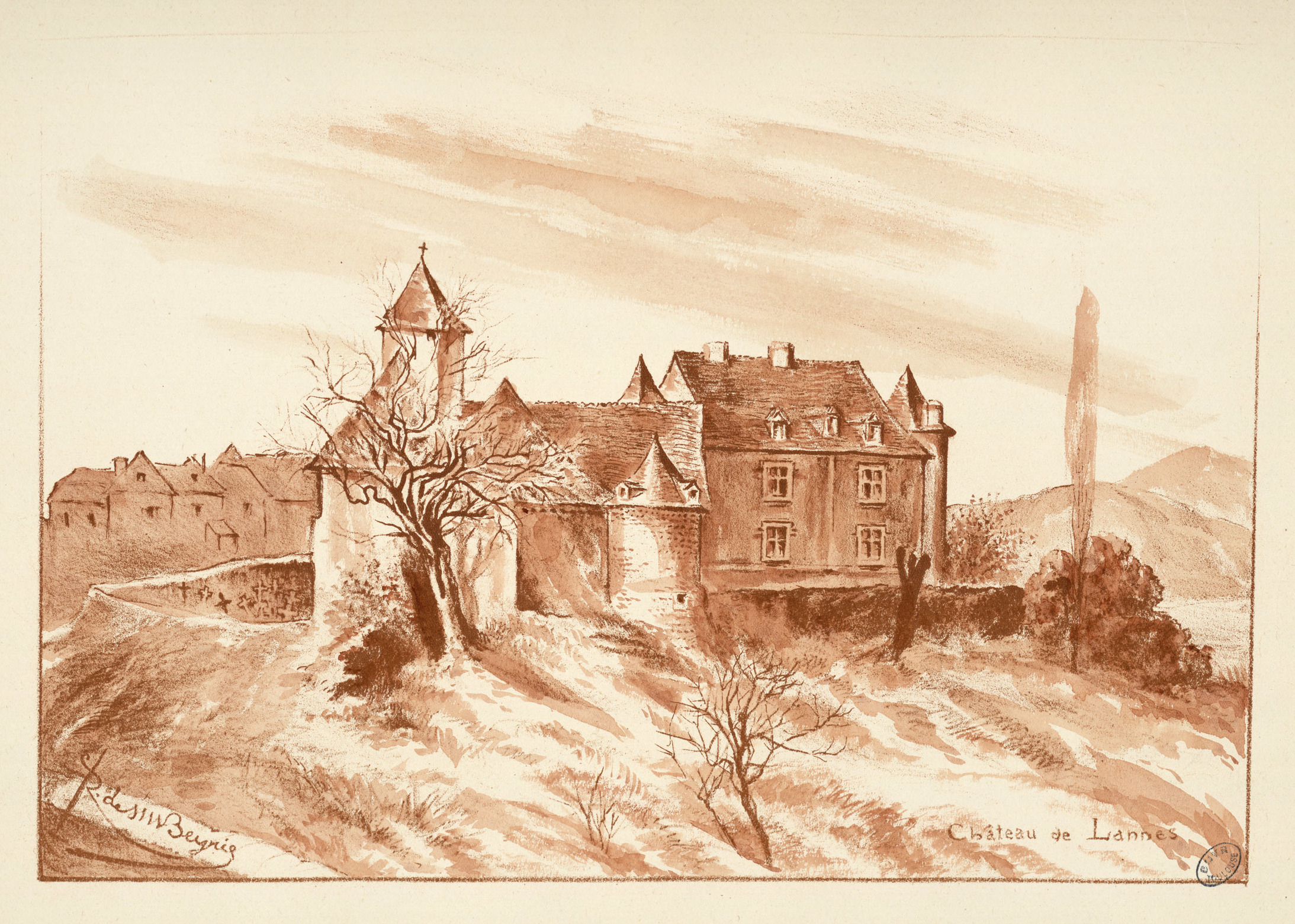
- The chateau of Lannes
- Location of Lanne-en-Barétous
- Location within France Location within Nouvelle-Aquitaine
- Coordinates: 43°06′51″N 0°45′30″W
- Country: France
- Region: Nouvelle-Aquitaine
- Department: Pyrénées-Atlantiques
- Arrondissement: Oloron-Sainte-Marie
- Canton: Oloron-Sainte-Marie-1
- Intercommunality: Haut Béarn

Government
  - Mayor (2020–2026): Lydie Althapé
- Area^{1}: 41.48 km^{2} (16.02 sq mi)
- Elevation: 306 m (1,004 ft)
- Highest elevation: 1,568 m (5,144 ft)
- Lowest elevation: 231 m (758 ft)
- Population (2023): 481
  - Density: 11.6/km^{2} (30.0/sq mi)
- Time zone: UTC+01:00 (CET)
  - Summer (DST): UTC+02:00 (CEST)
- INSEE/Postal code: 64310 /64570
- ^{1} French Land Register data, which excludes lakes, ponds, glaciers > 1 km^{2} (0.386 sq mi or 247 acres) and river estuaries.

Lanne-en-Barétous (French pronunciation: [lan ɑ̃ baʁetus]; Occitan: Lana de Varetons; Basque: Landa, before 1989: Lanne) is a commune in the southwestern French department of Pyrénées-Atlantiques.

== See also ==
- Communes of the Pyrénées-Atlantiques department
