= Montalbán =

Montalbán or Montalban may refer to:

== Places ==
- Montalbán, Teruel, a town in Teruel Province, Aragon, Spain
- Montalbán, Carabobo, a town in Venezuela
- Montalbán de Córdoba, a town in Córdoba Province, Andalucia, Spain
- La Puebla de Montalbán, a town in Toledo Province, Castile-La Mancha, Spain
- Villarejo de Montalbán, a town in Toledo Province, Castile-La Mancha, Spain
- Montalbán, Caracas, zone of Caracas, Venezuela
- Montalbán Municipality, Carabobo, Venezuela
- Rodriguez, Rizal, Philippines (formerly Montalban)
- Ricardo Montalbán Theatre, commonly known as The Montalbán, a theatre in Los Angeles
- Montauban, a town in Occitania, France, known in Occitan as Montalban

== People ==
- See Montalbán (surname)

== See also ==
- Montauban (disambiguation)
