= Montauban (disambiguation) =

Montauban is a commune in and capital of the Tarn-et-Garonne department in the Occitanie region of southern France.

Montauban may also refer to:

- Arrondissement of Montauban containing the town
- Roman Catholic Diocese of Montauban centred on the town
- Montauban-Ville-Bourbon station, the railway station serving the town
- US Montauban, the town's main rugby club

== Other places ==
- Montauban-sur-l'Ouvèze, a commune in the Drôme department in southeastern France
- Montauban-de-Luchon, a commune near the Spanish border
- Montauban-de-Picardie, a village in the Somme department in northeastern France
- Montauban-de-Bretagne, a commune in Brittany in northwestern France
- Montauban Lake, in Saint-Alban, Quebec, Canada

== People ==
- Montauband (Etienne de Montauban), a 17th-century pirate
- Renaud de Montauban, a legendary knight known from 12th-century narratives

== See also ==
- Montalbán (disambiguation)
