= Joseph Latour =

French painter

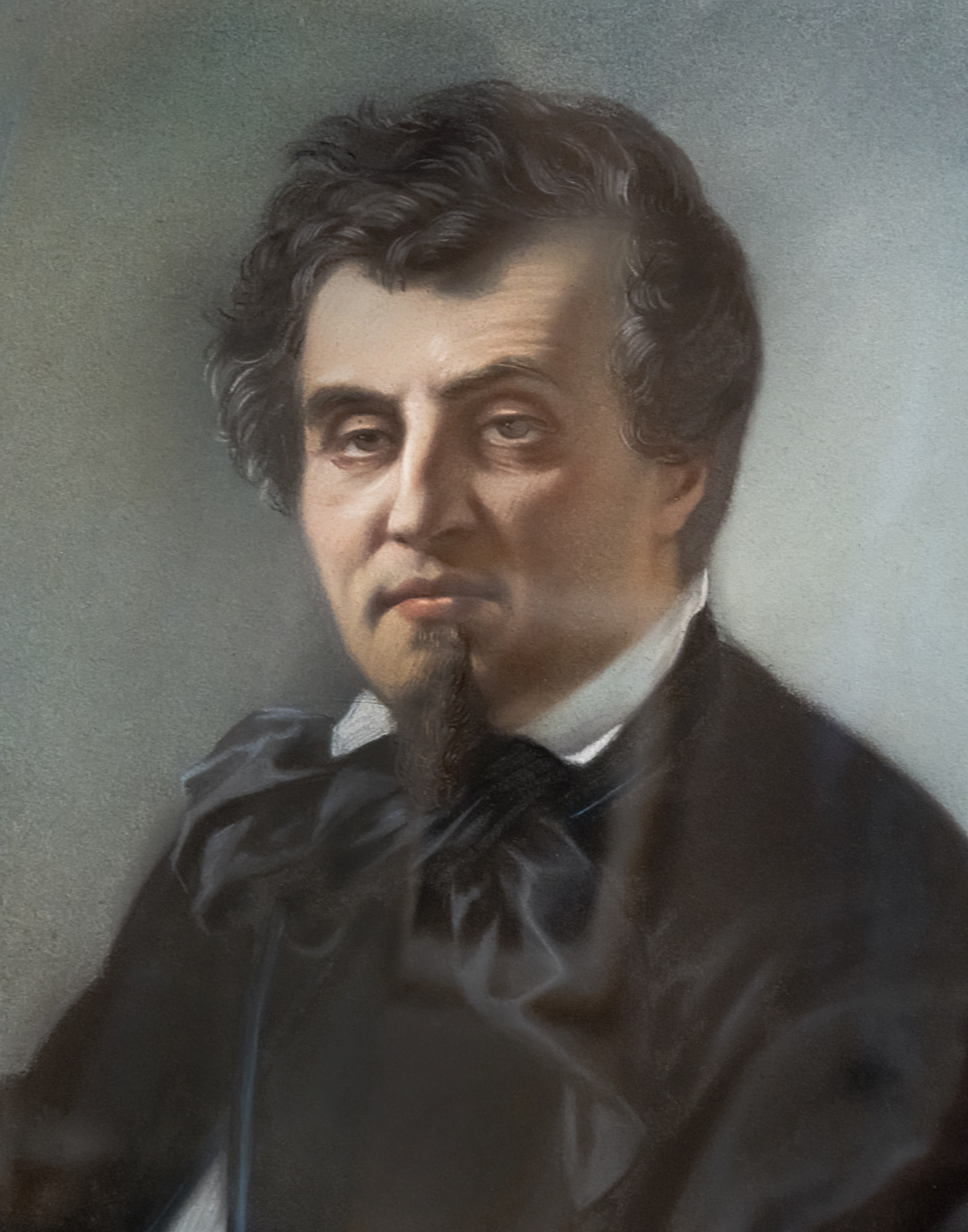
- Joseph Latour by Gabriel Durand, 1856 (Pastel, Musée du Vieux-Toulouse)
- Born: Joseph, Pierre, Tancrède Latour; April 17, 1806; Noé, France
- Died: March, 1 mars 1863 (aged 56); Toulouse, France
- Movement: Romanticism

Joseph, Pierre, Tancrède Latour (April 17, 1806 – March, 1 mars 1863) was a French Romantic drawer and painter. His works are hosted by several museums in southern France.

From the École des Beaux-Arts of Toulouse, he taught drawing at the Institution des Feuillants and his artist studio was frequented by Charles de Saint Félix, Eugène Fil, Jules de Lahondés, Maxime Lalanne, Louise de Carayon-Talpayrac, Eugène de Malbos and Jacques Raymond Brascassat.

He is more recognized for his drawings and his landscapes from nature – mostly of Pyrenees – than for his paintings.

== Selected works ==
- His works are hosted in the Gaillac Museum of Fine Arts, the Vaurais Country Museum in Lavaur, the Pyrenean Museum in Lourdes, the Musée Fabre in Montpellier and the Paul-Dupuy Museum in Toulouse.
- Exhibition: Joseph Latour (1806–1863). Drawings of a traveling painter, from Toulouse to Spain: February to May 2011, the Gaillac Museum of Fine Arts .

== Gallery ==
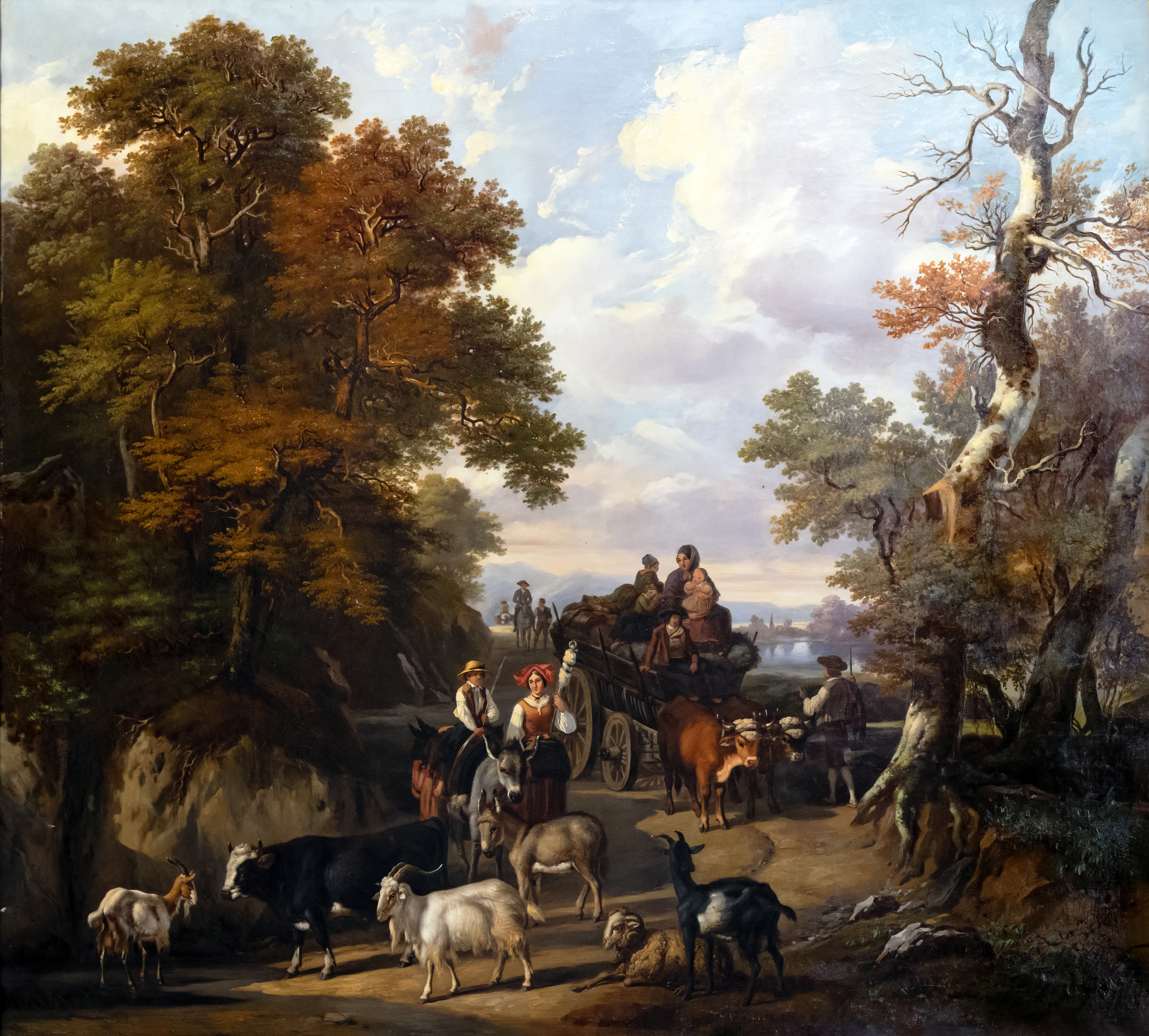
Return from fair (1850) - Musée des Beaux-Arts de Gaillac

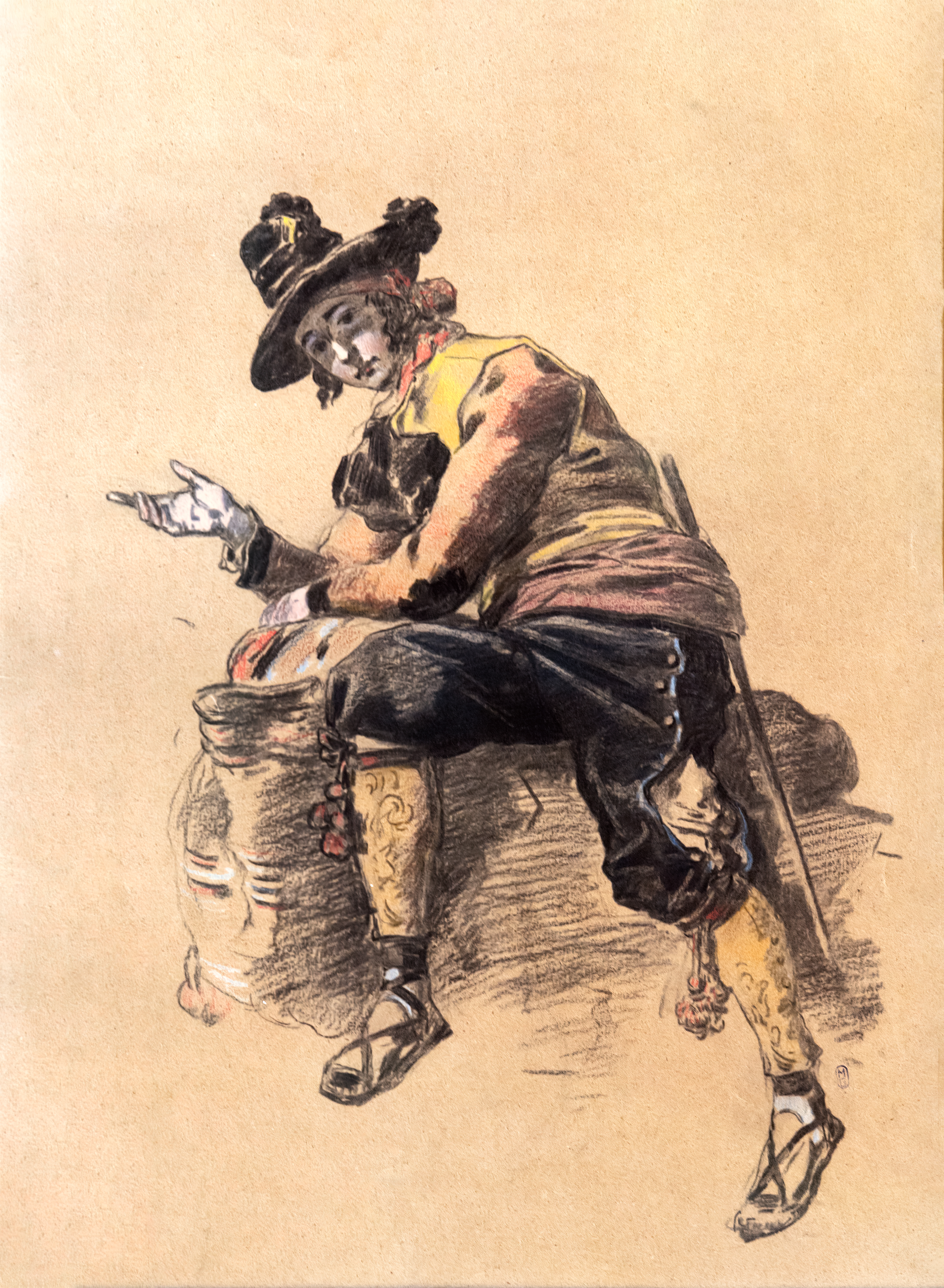
Young Spanish peasant in costume - Musée des Beaux-Arts de Gaillac

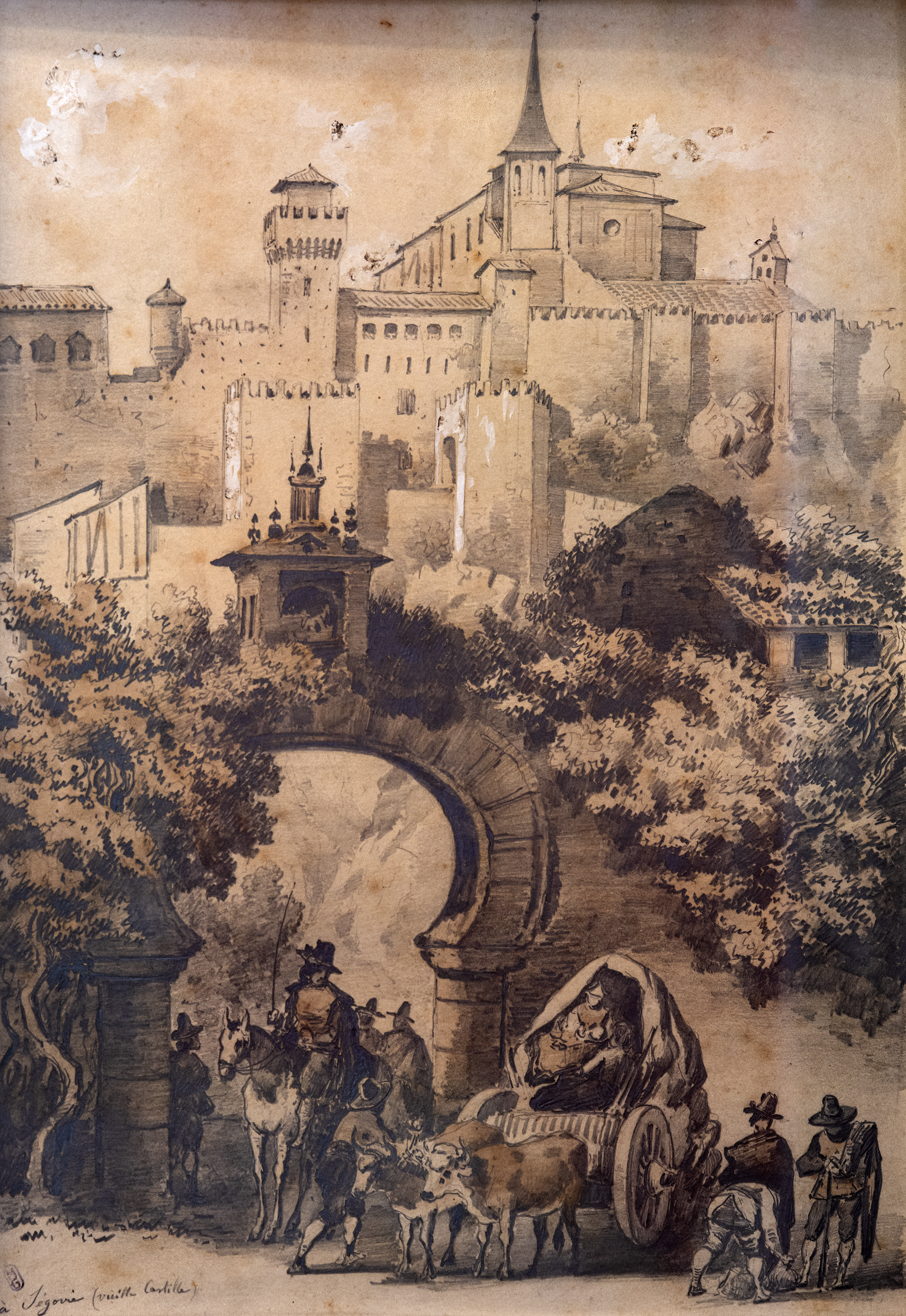
In Segovia, old Castile - Musée des Beaux-Arts de Gaillac

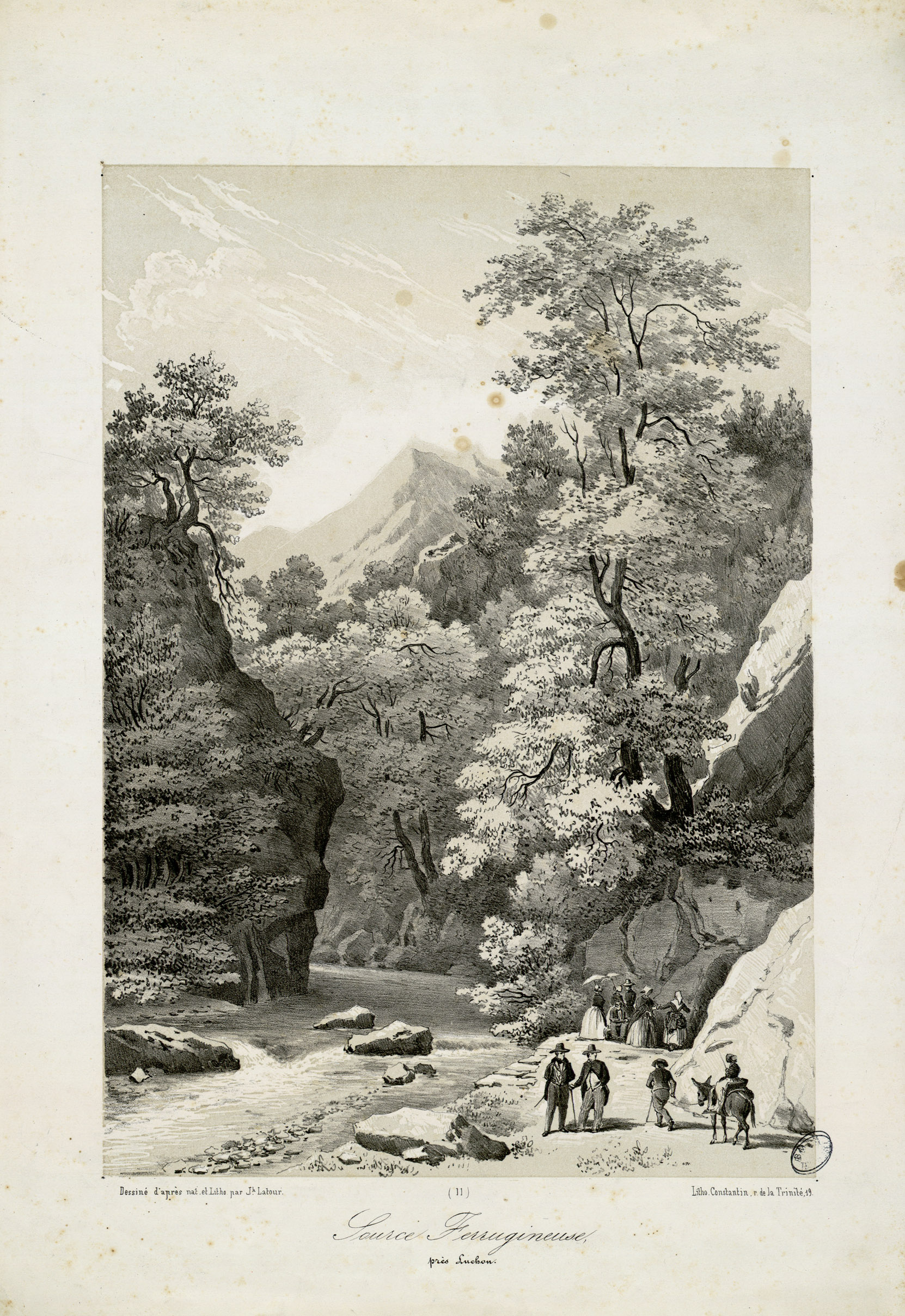
Ferruginous spring, near Luchon

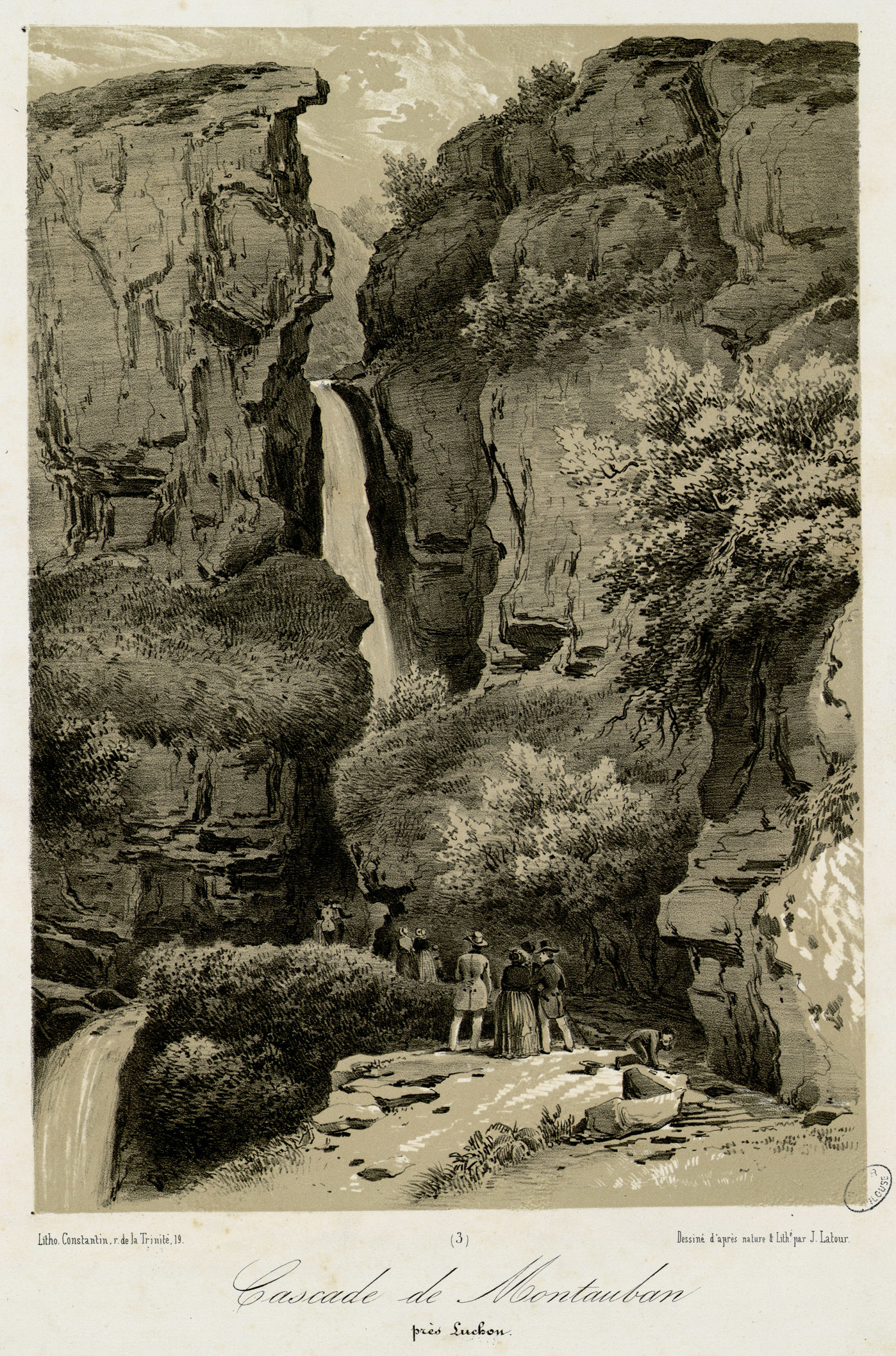
Montauban-de-Luchon Cascade

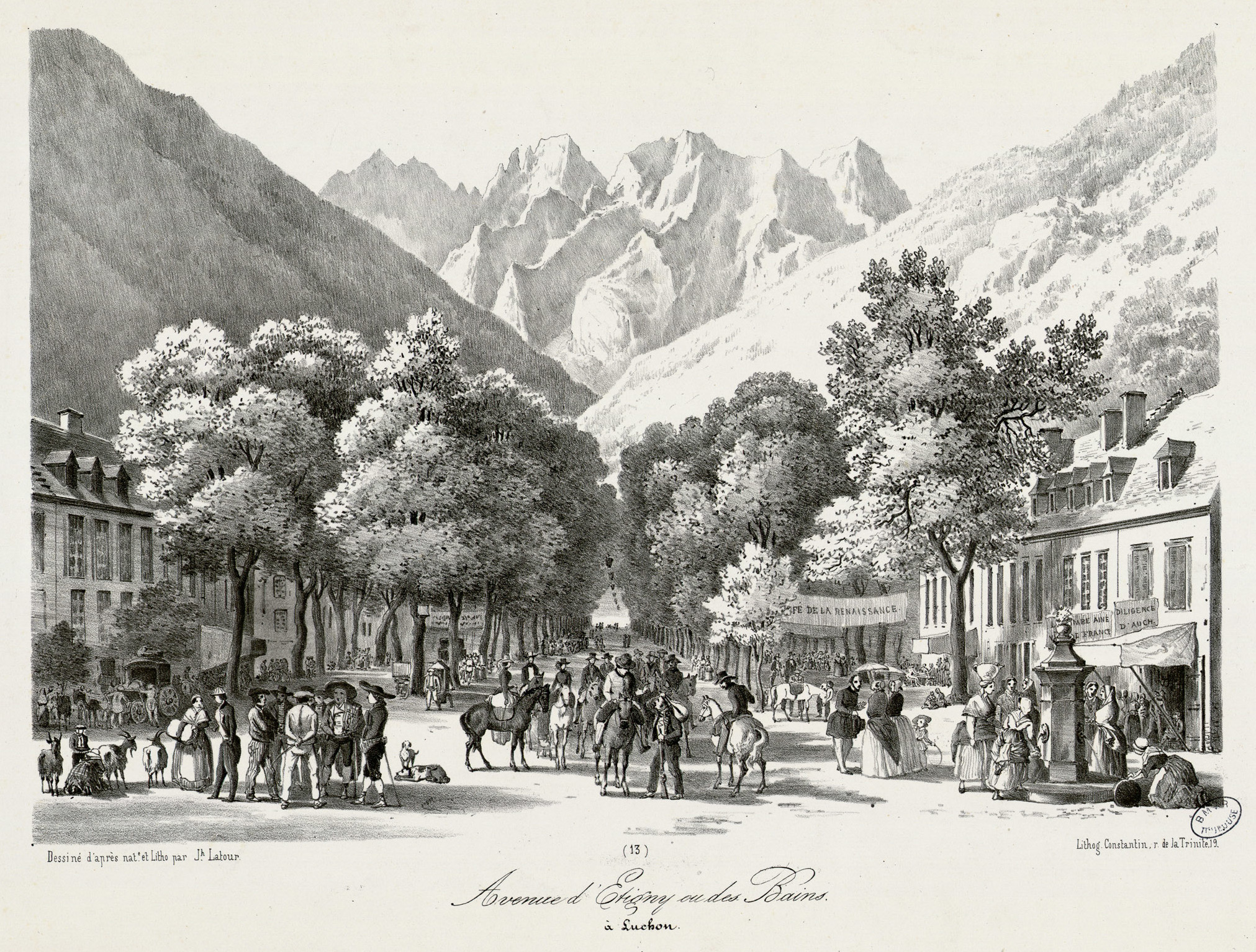
Avenue d'Etigny, in Bagnères-de-Luchon

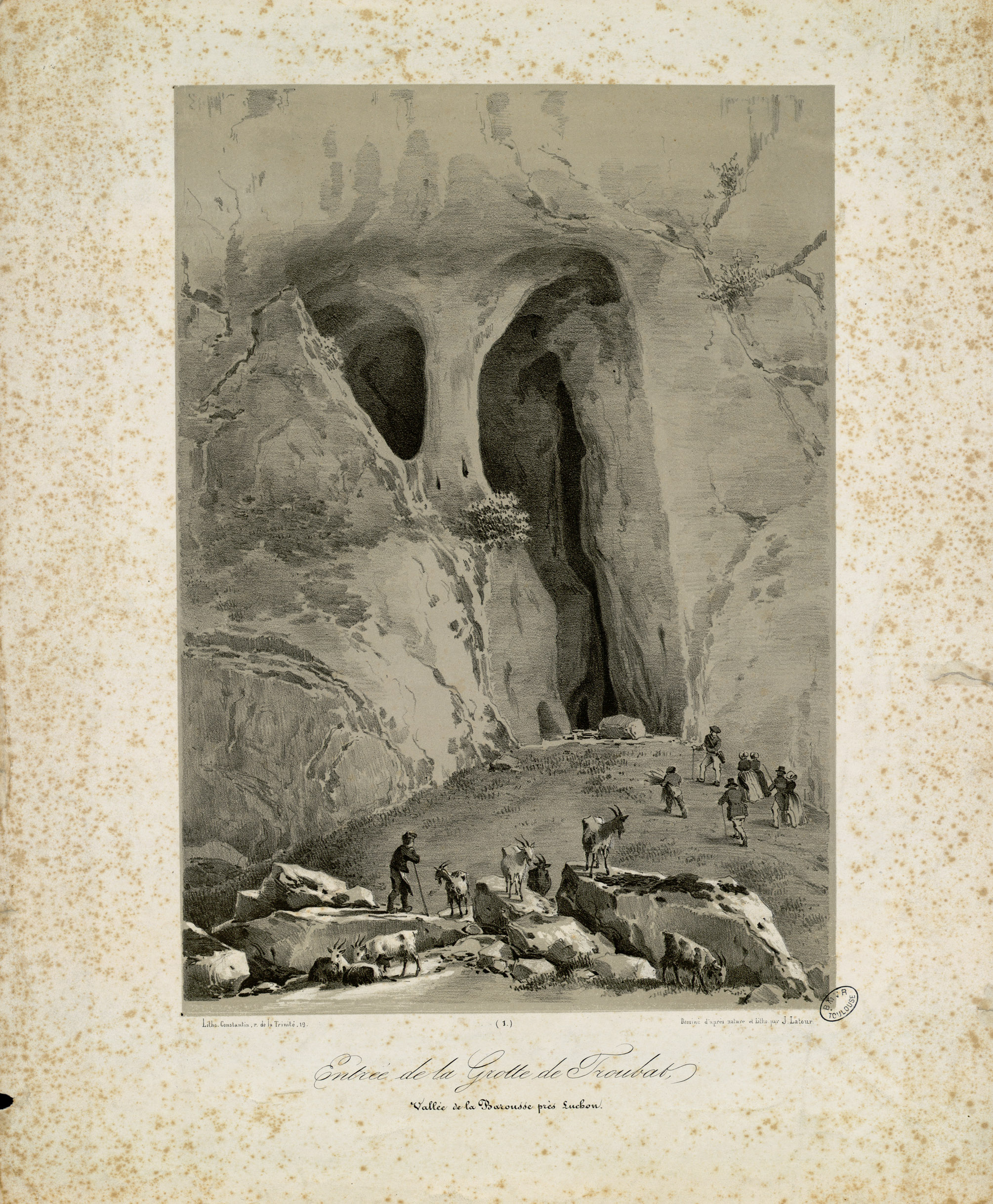
Entrance to the Cave of Troubat - Valley of the Barousse

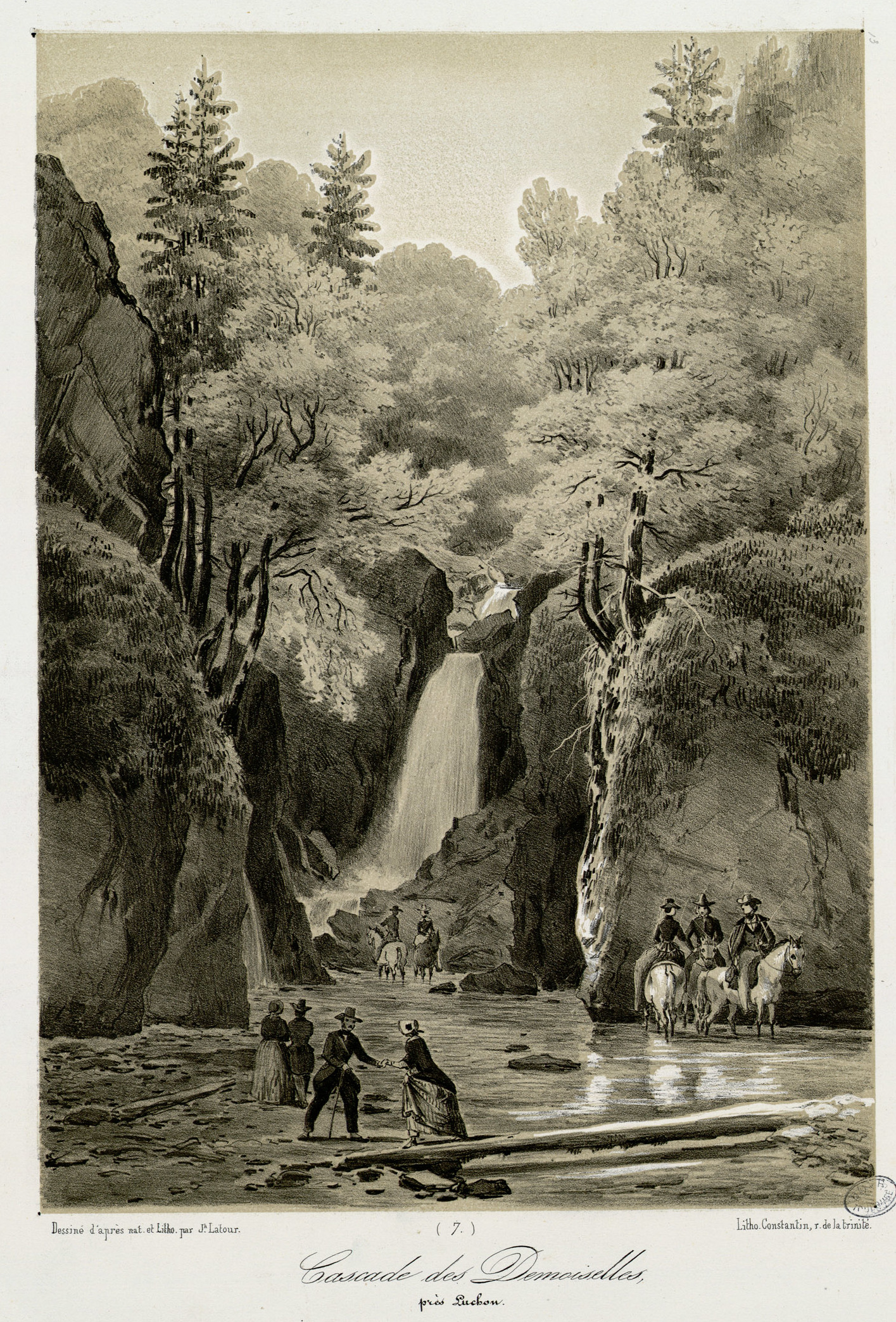
Cascade des Demoiselles, near Luchon
