= Montauban-de-Luchon =

- Commune
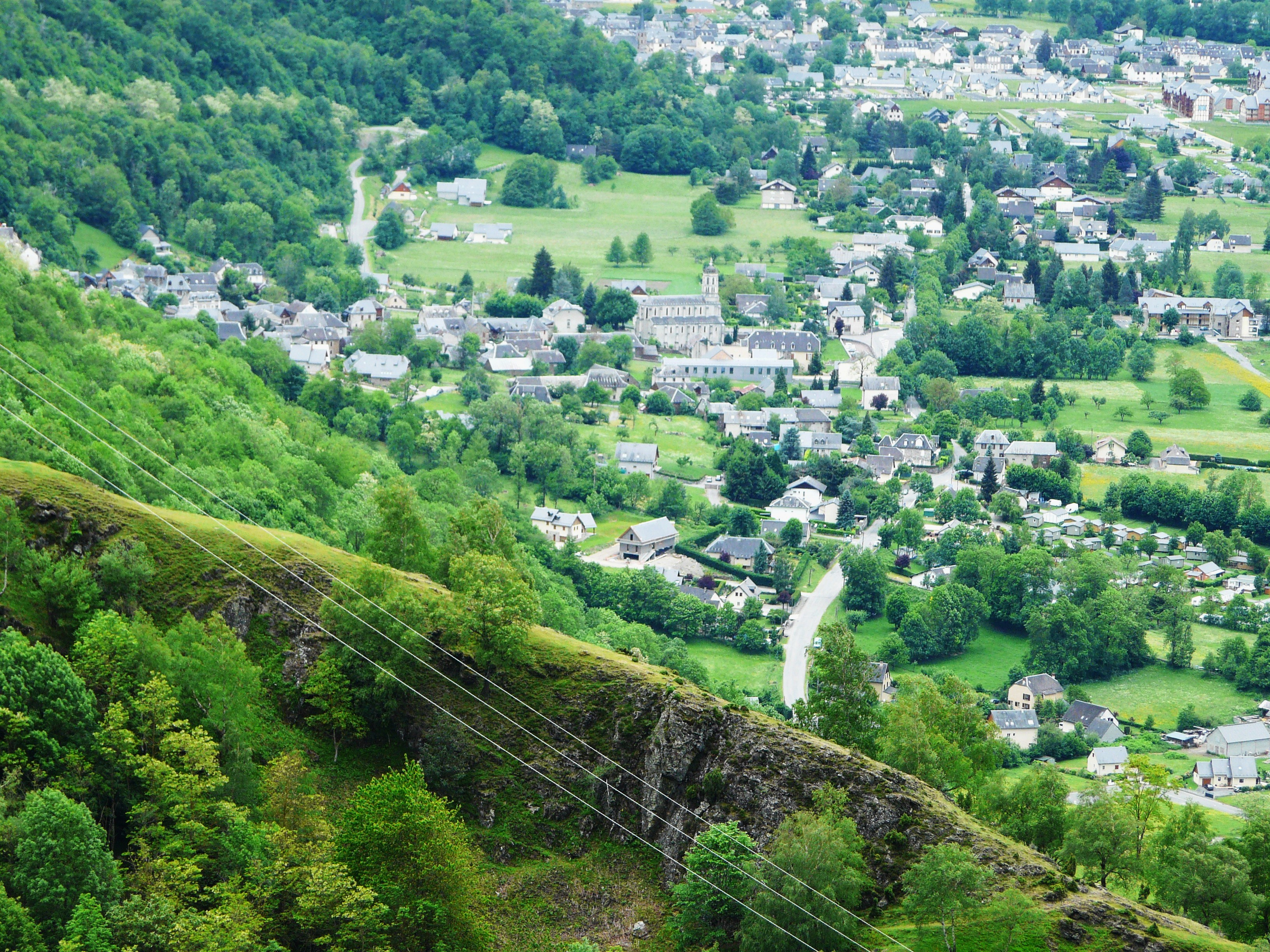
- A general view of Montauban-de-Luchon
- Location of Montauban-de-Luchon
- Location within France Location within Occitanie
- Coordinates: 42°47′37″N 0°36′38″E
- Country: France
- Region: Occitania
- Department: Haute-Garonne
- Arrondissement: Saint-Gaudens
- Canton: Bagnères-de-Luchon

Government
  - Mayor (2020–2026): Claude Cau
- Area^{1}: 6.02 km^{2} (2.32 sq mi)
- Elevation: 640 m (2,100 ft)
- Highest elevation: 1,902 m (6,240 ft)
- Lowest elevation: 617 m (2,024 ft)
- Population (2023): 498
  - Density: 82.7/km^{2} (214/sq mi)
- Time zone: UTC+01:00 (CET)
  - Summer (DST): UTC+02:00 (CEST)
- INSEE/Postal code: 31360 /31110
- ^{1} French Land Register data, which excludes lakes, ponds, glaciers > 1 km^{2} (0.386 sq mi or 247 acres) and river estuaries.

Montauban-de-Luchon (French pronunciation: [mɔ̃tobɑ̃ də lyʃɔ̃]; Gascon: Montauban de Luishon) is a commune in the Haute-Garonne department of southwestern France.

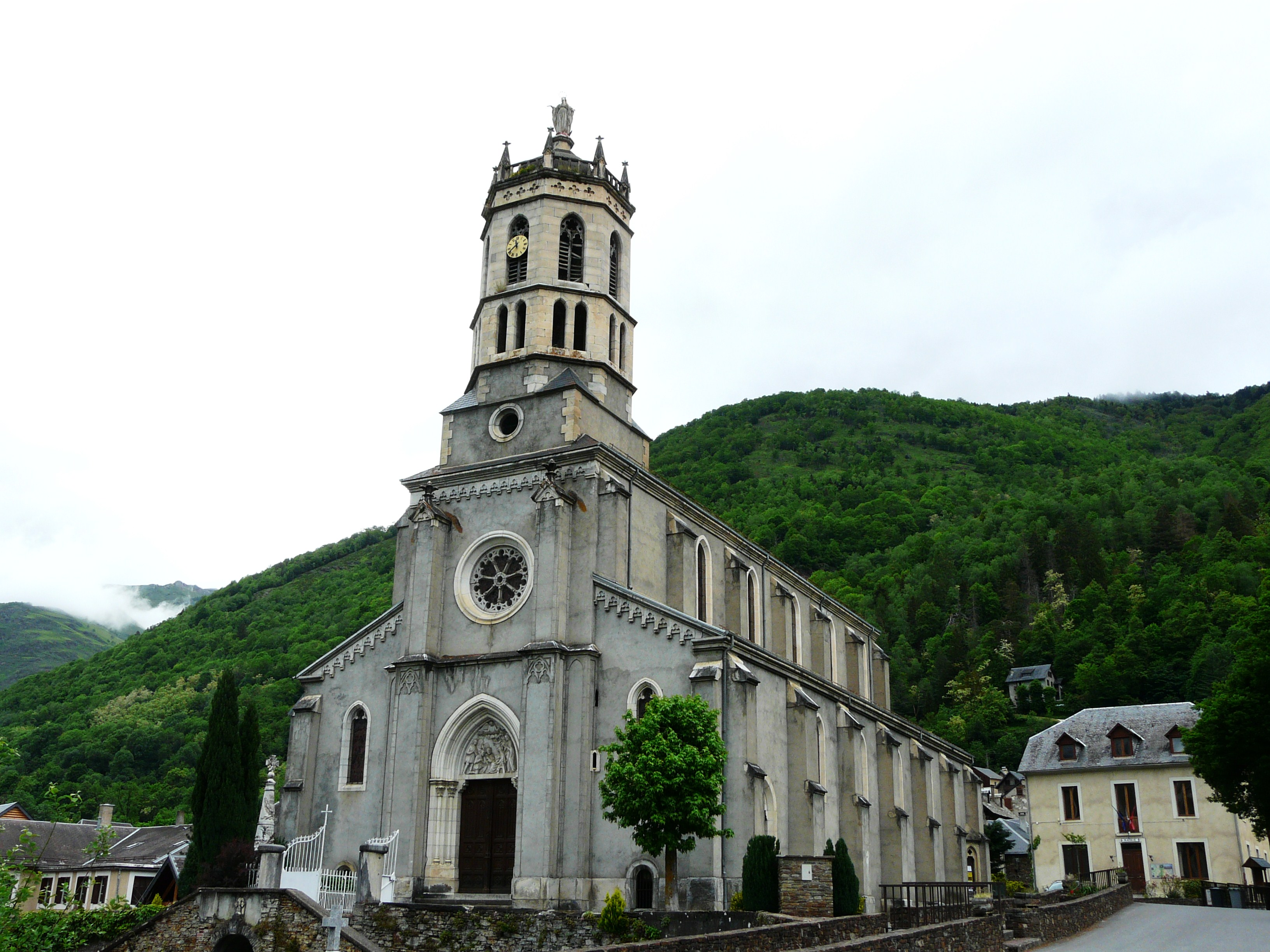
Church.

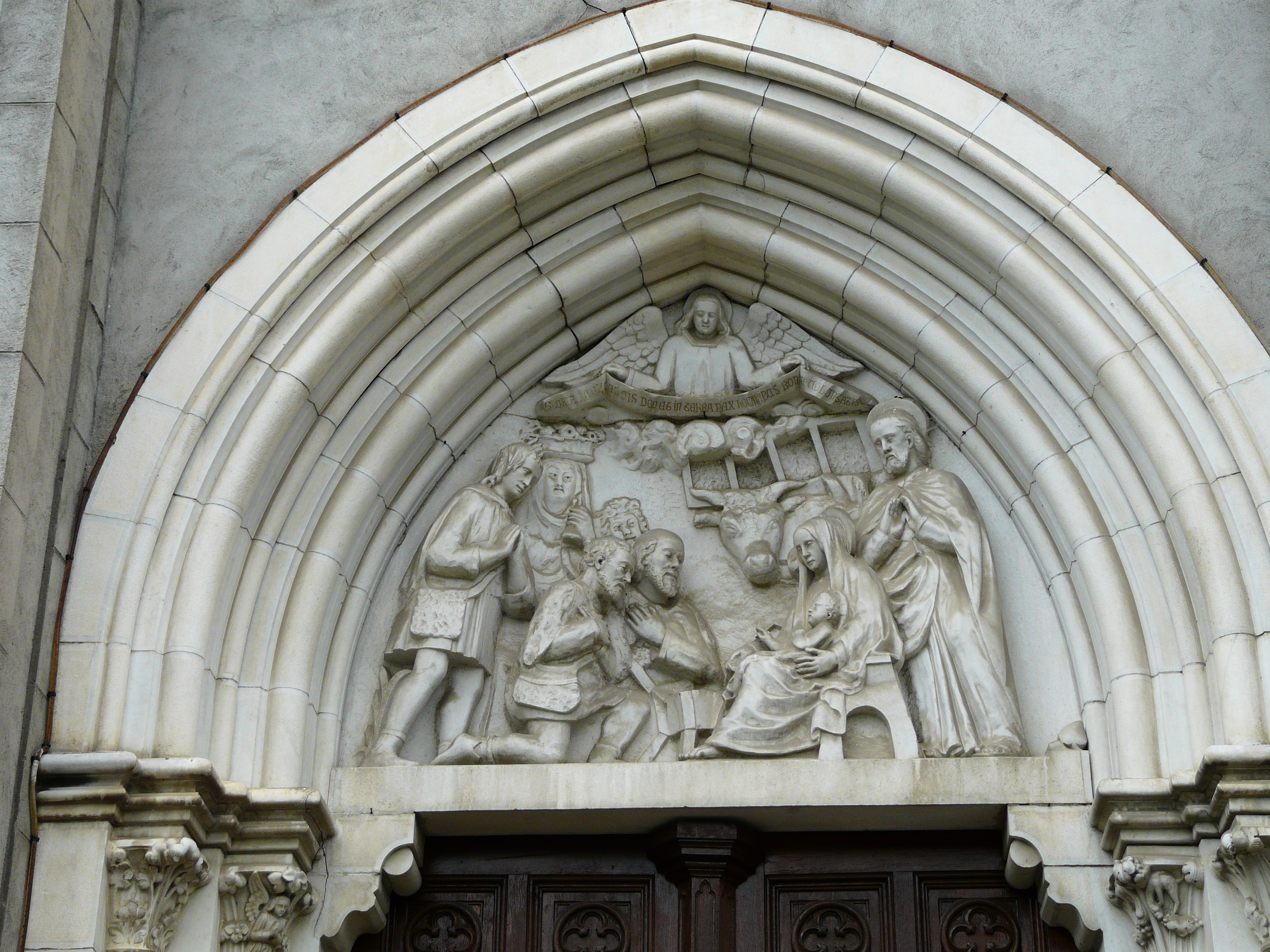
Tympanum

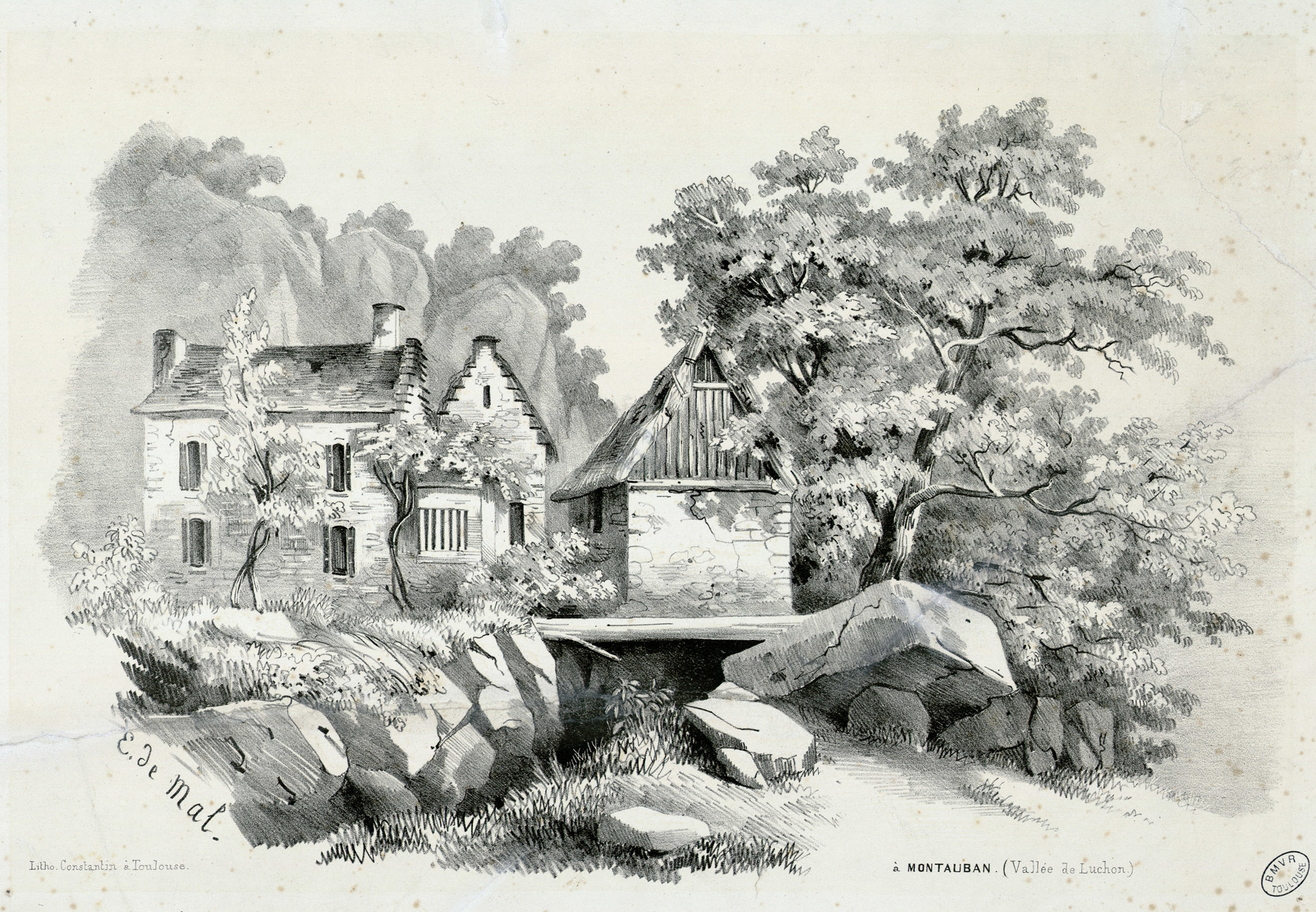
near 1840, by Eugène de Malbos

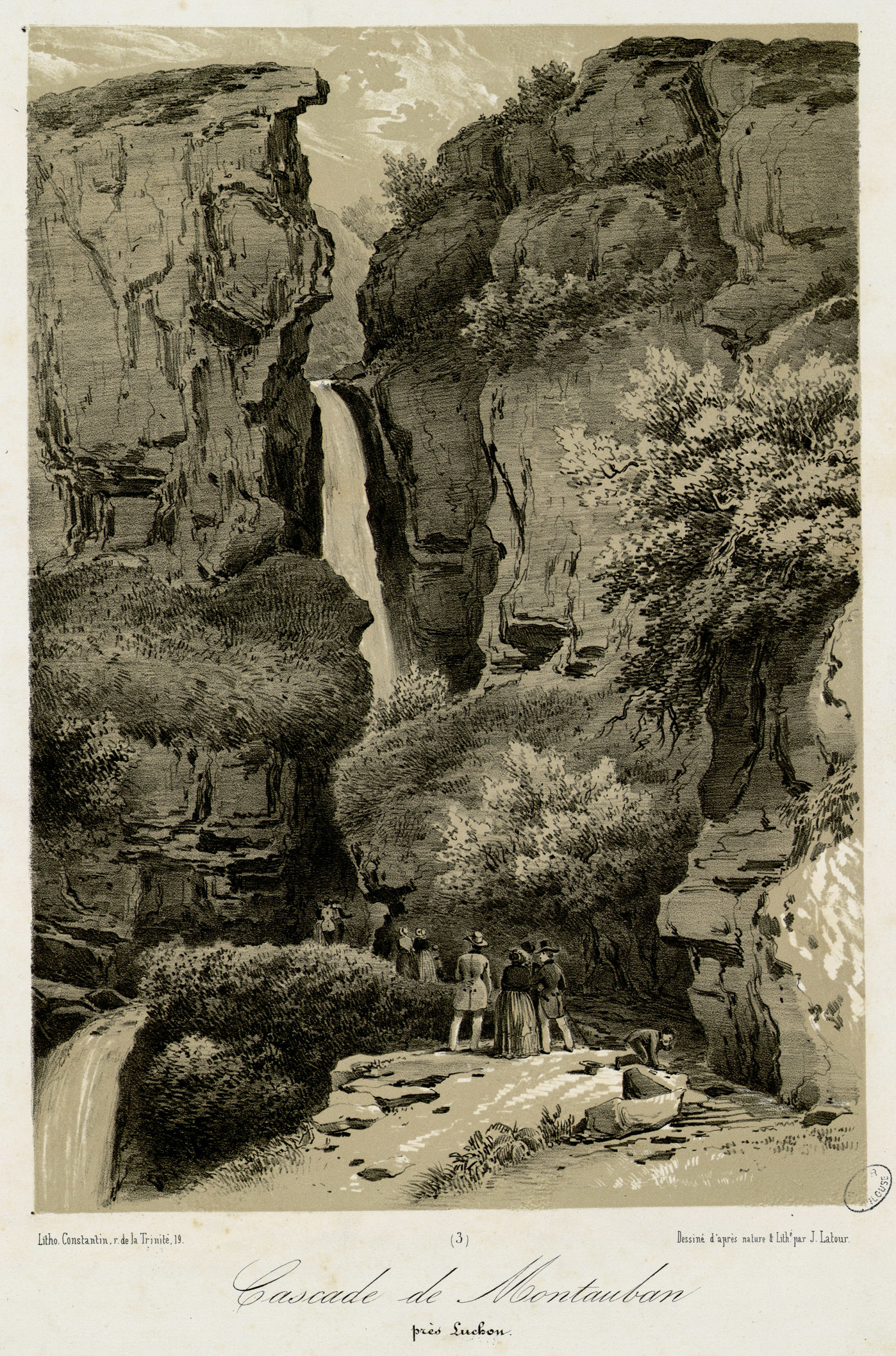
Cascade by Joseph Latour

== Population ==
Historical population
Year	Pop.	±% p.a.
1968	337	—
1975	352	+0.62%
1982	416	+2.42%
1990	434	+0.53%
1999	481	+1.15%
2007	452	−0.77%
2012	481	+1.25%
2017	496	+0.62%
2023	498	+0.07%
Source: INSEE

== See also ==
- Communes of the Haute-Garonne department
