= Gustave de Clausade =

19th-century French lawyer, historian

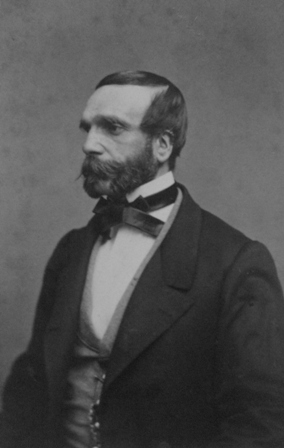
- Born: Pierre Amélie Gustave de Clausade; 25 August 1815; Rabastens
- Died: 29 July 1888 (aged 72); Toulouse
- Occupations: Historian; Politician

Pierre Amélie Gustave de Clausade de Saint Amarand (25 August 1815 – 29 July 1888) was a 19th-century French lawyer, historian, and a member of the Société des Antiquaires de France.

== Main works ==
- 1835: Un voyages d’artiste, guide dans les Pyrénées par deux amis, Anonymous (Gustave de Clausade and Eugène de Malbos), Dagalier, Toulouse.
- 1843: Une Visite au bon Henry, suivie d'une excursion en Guipuscoa par Bayonne, text by G. de C., drawings by Eugène de Malbos, Toulouse.
- 1843: Poésies Languedociennes et Françaises d'Auger Gaillard,
- 1859: Le Château de Bruniquel sous Baudouin de Toulouse, par Gustave de Clausade, extrait des Mémoires de l’Académie des Sciences Inscriptions et Belles-Lettres de Toulouse, 1859

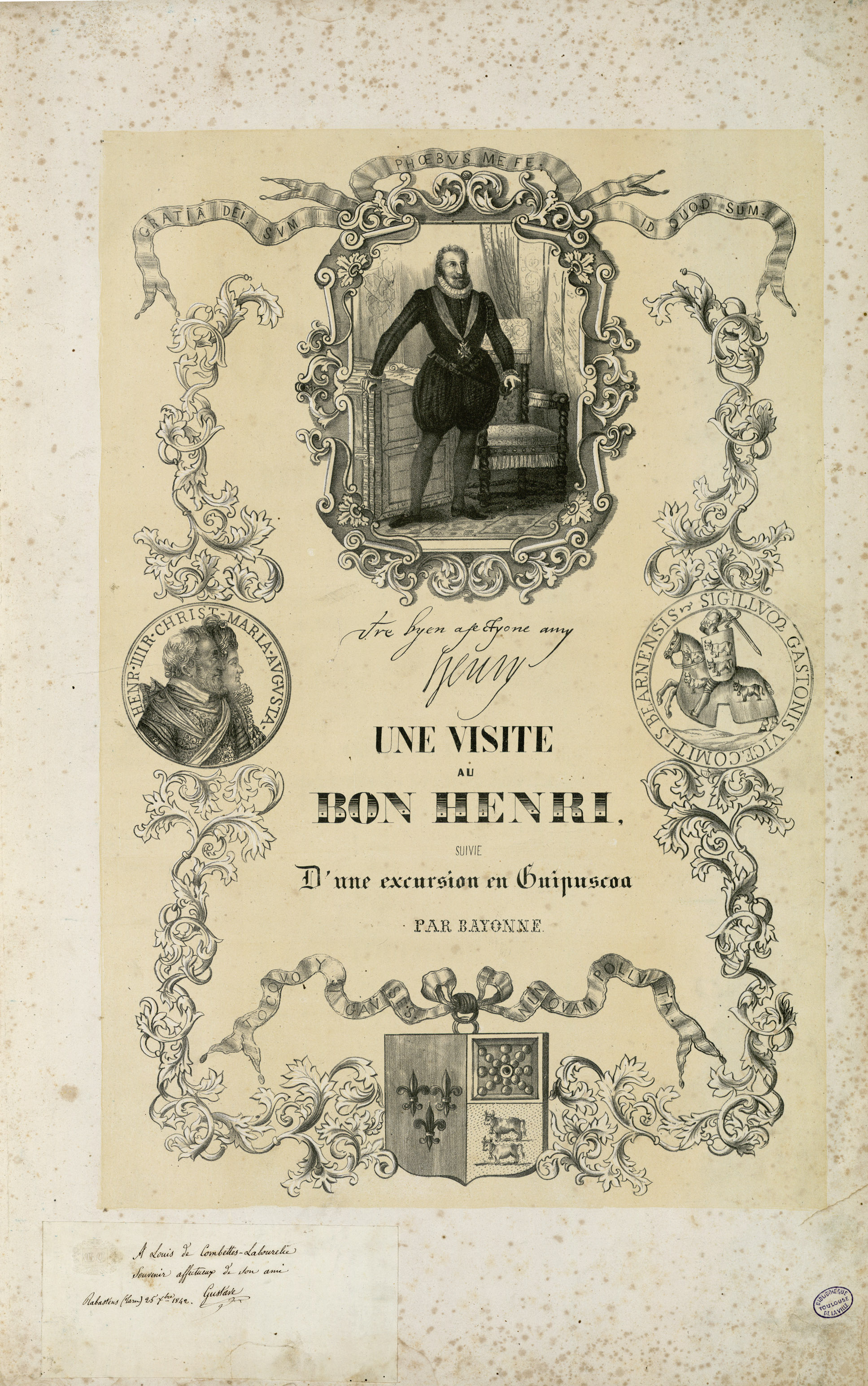
Une Visite au bon Henry, suivie d'une excursion en Guipuscoa par Bayonne

.
