= Eugène de Malbos =

French painter

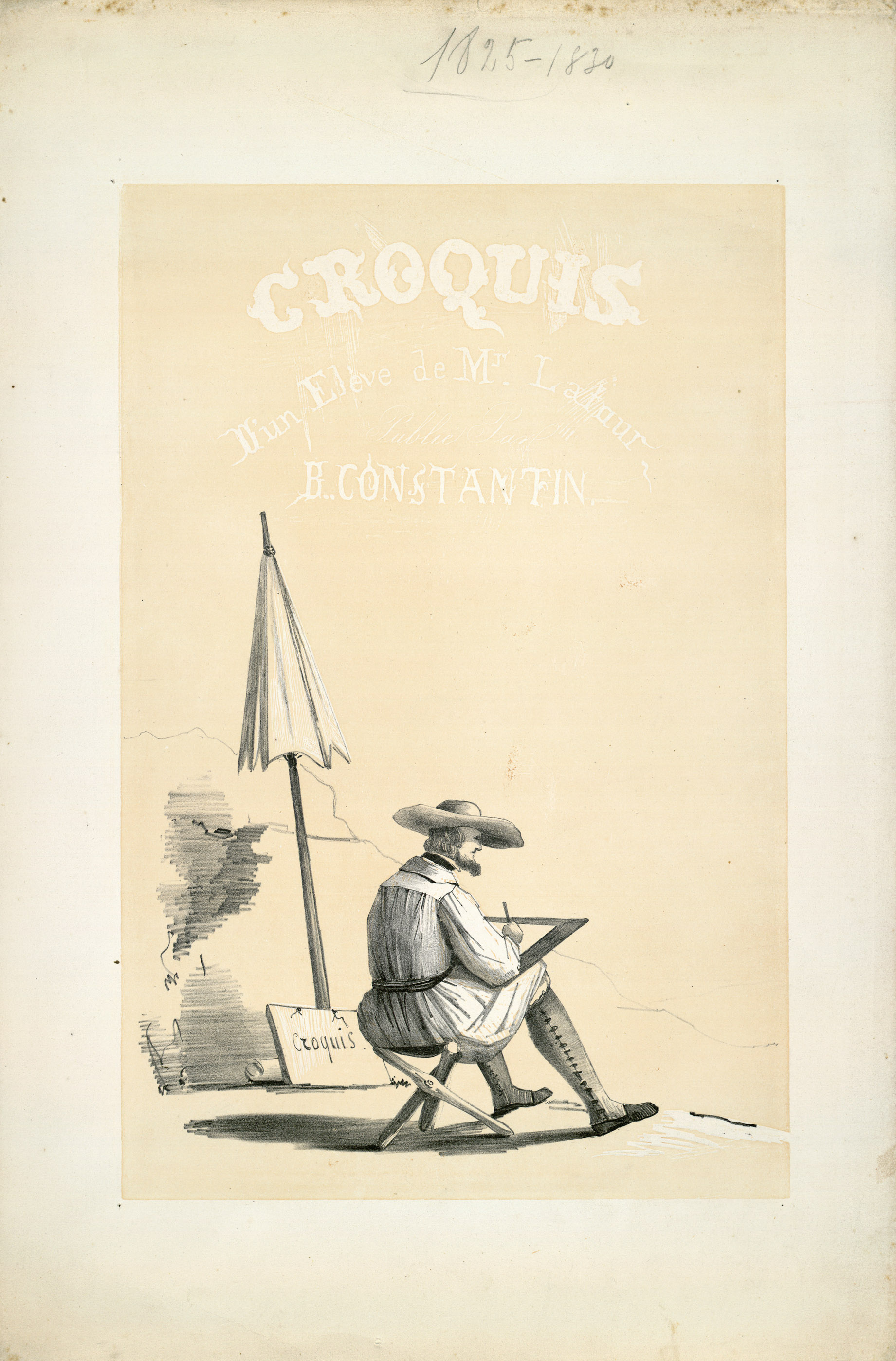
- Born: Louis Aimé Eugène Bastide de Malbosc; 21 August 1811; Les Vans, France
- Died: 29 May 1858 (aged 46); Toulouse, France
- Movement: Romanticism
- Patrons: Joseph Latour

Eugène de Malbos (21 August 1811 – 29 May 1858) was a French Romantic painter known for his lithographs of the Pyrenees.

Some of his works are hosted by the Paul-Dupuy Museum in Toulouse. His signature is : “E. de Mal.”.

== Selected works and publications ==
- Un voyage d'artiste. Guide dans les Pyrénées par deux amis, Dagalier, Toulouse 1835, with Gustave de Clausade
- Croquis d'un élève de M. Latour, published by Constantin in Toulouse, 22 lithographs 48 x 33 drawn between 1825 and 1830
- Une visite au bon roy Henry, suivie d'une excursion au Guispuscoa, par Bayonne, text of Gustave de Clausade, published by Constantin in Toulouse, 1843, 15 lithographs
- Les plus beaux sites des Pyrénées, published by Dufour in Tarbes, and Frick imprimeur in Paris. 13 works + 16 works from Maxime Lalanne
- Les Pyrénées romantiques by Frédéric Soutras : with 9 lithographs
- Le Routier des Frontières Méridionales contain some lithographs
- Guide-album aux eaux des Pyrénées : Vallées du Lavedan. Argelès, Castelloubon, Saint Savin, Azun, Gazost, Cauterets by Joseph-Bernard Abadie contain 16 colors lithographs
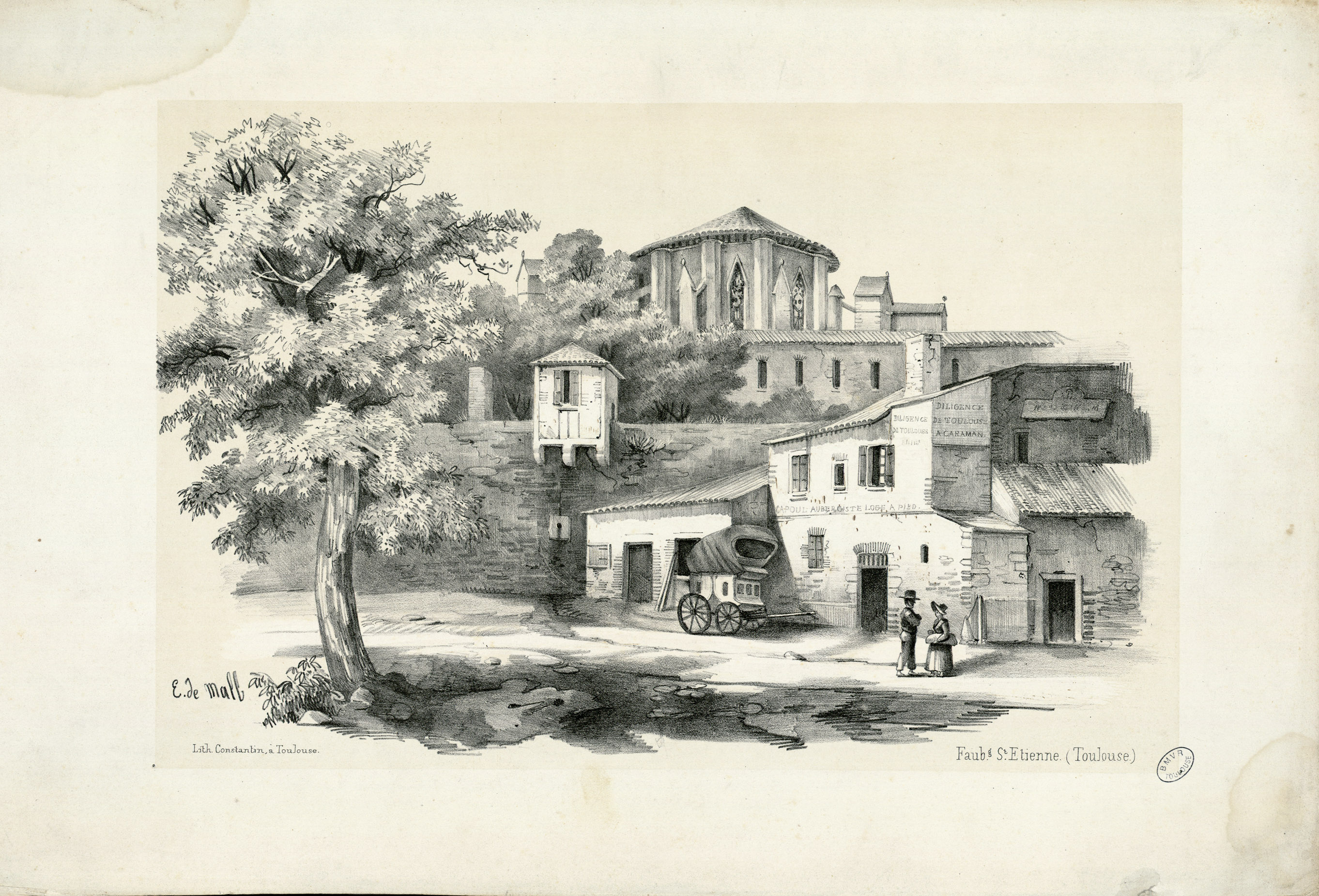
Le faubourg Saint-Étienne à Toulouse.

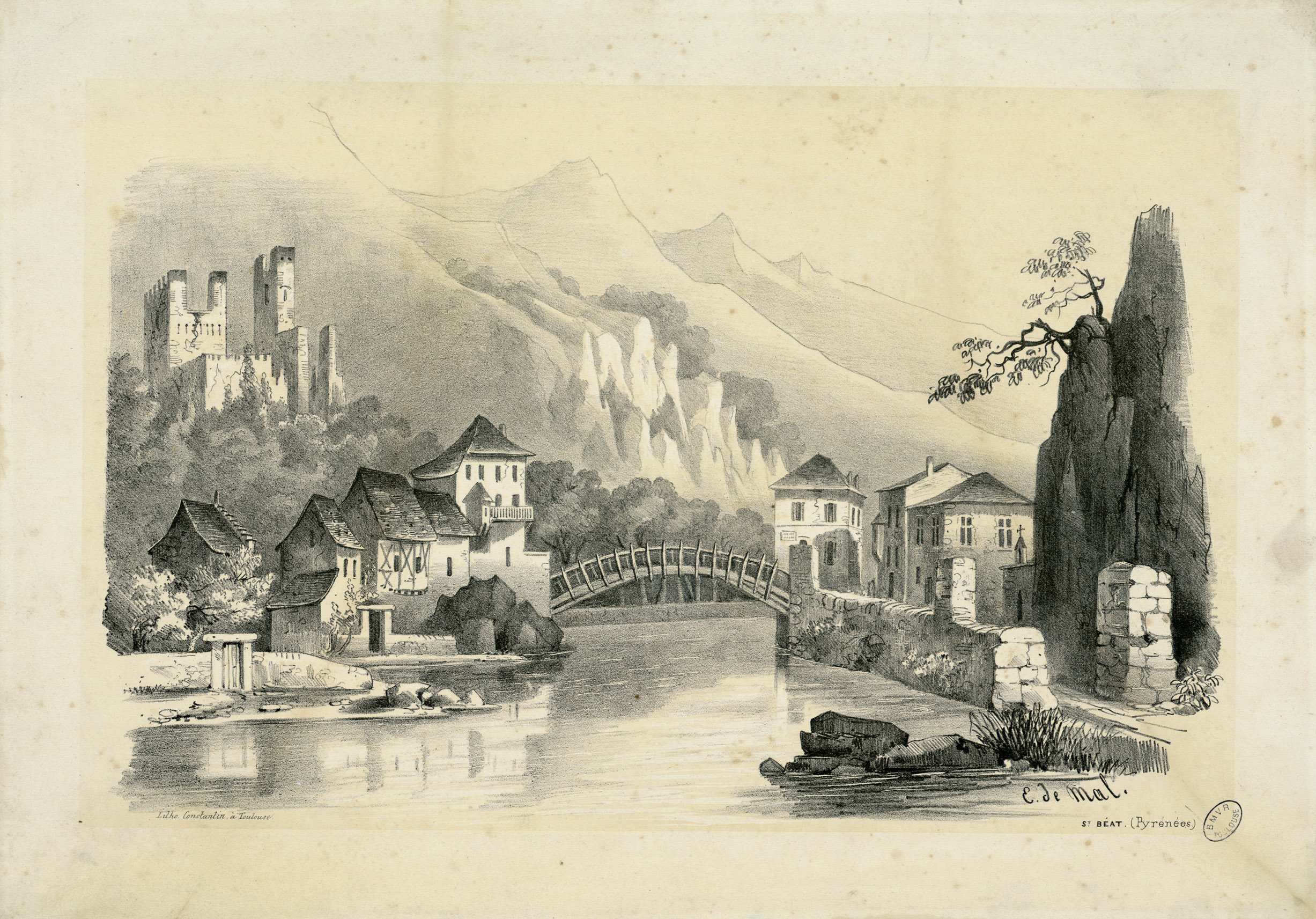
St. Béat (Pyrénées)

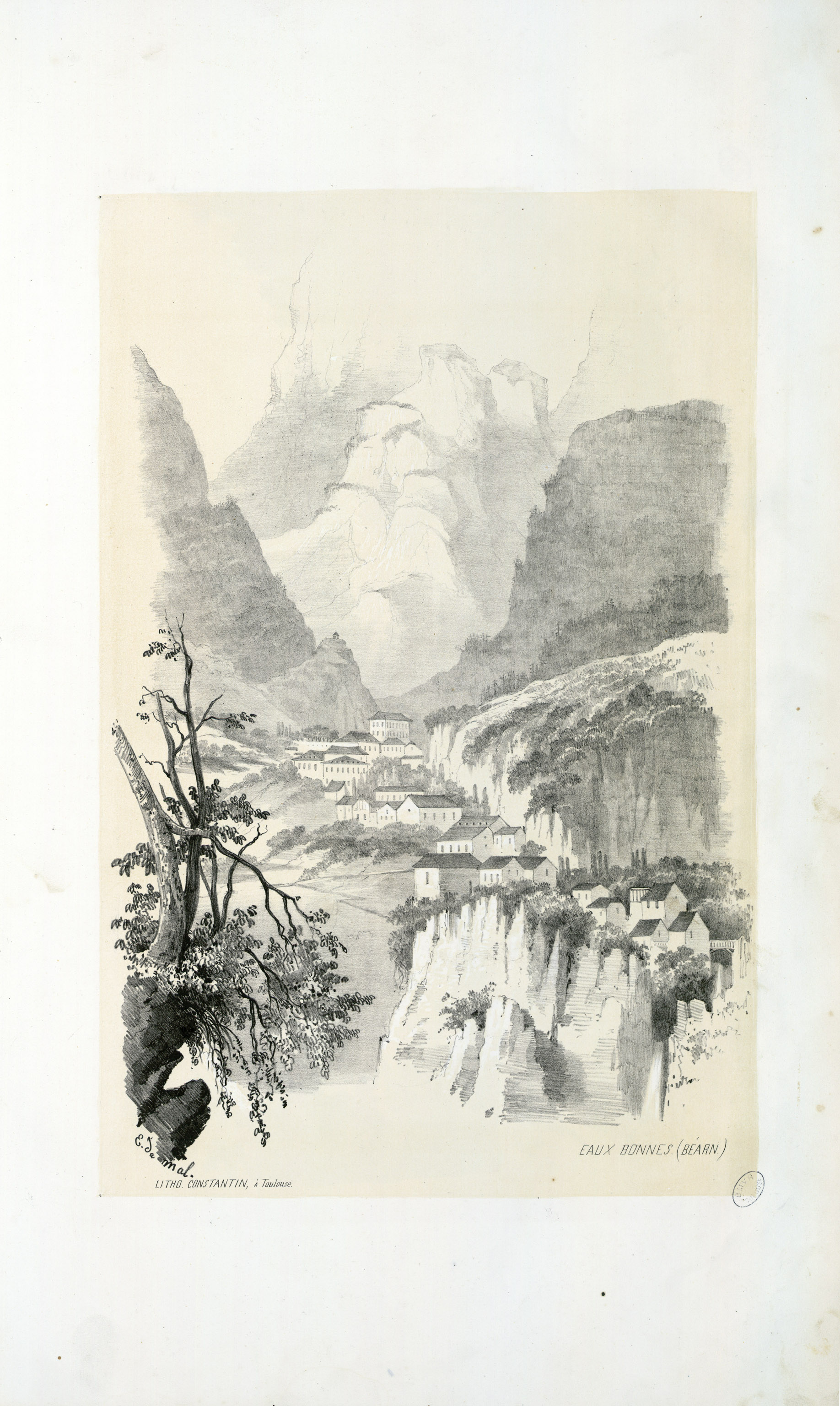
Eaux Bonnes (Béarn)

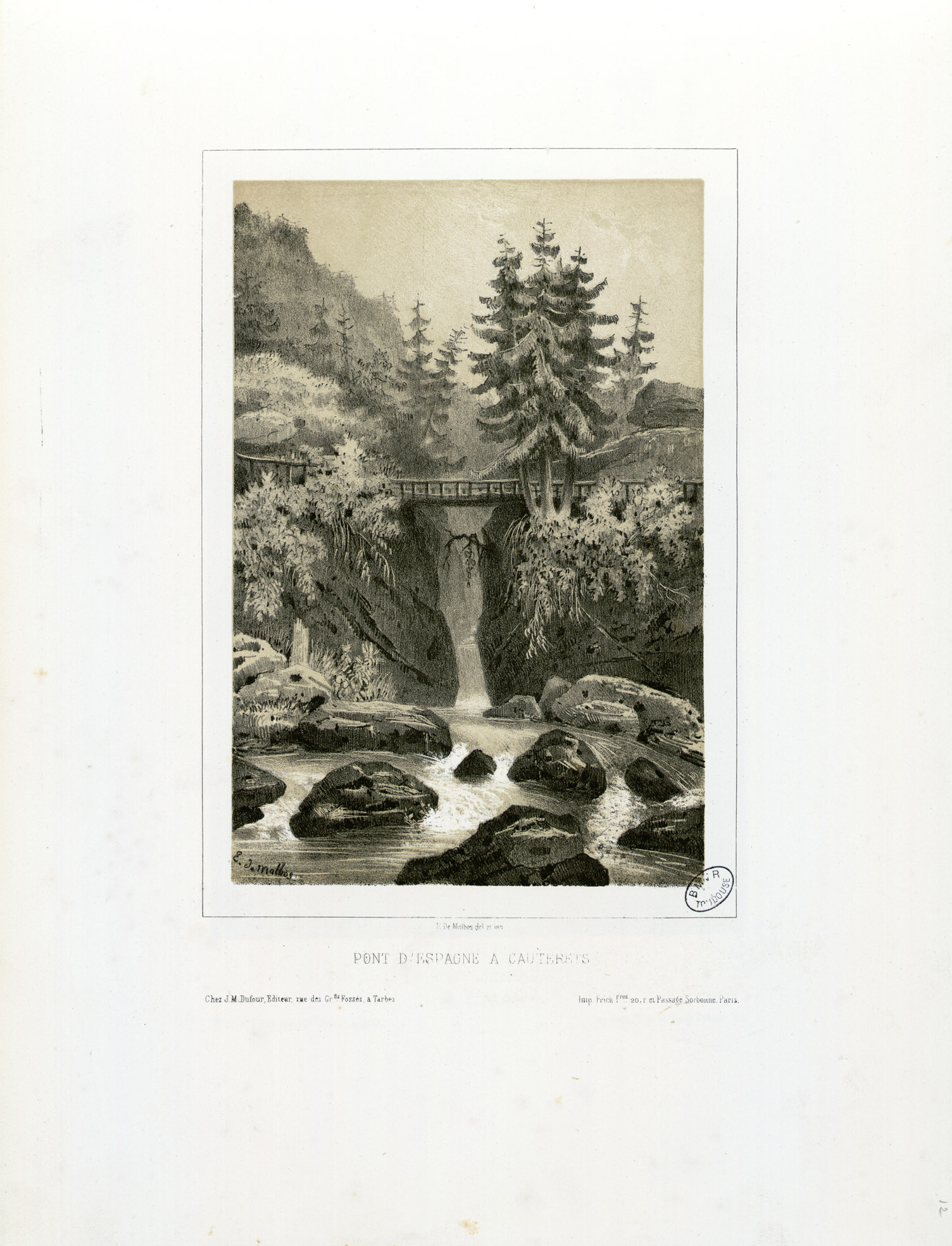
Pont d'Espagne à Cauterets

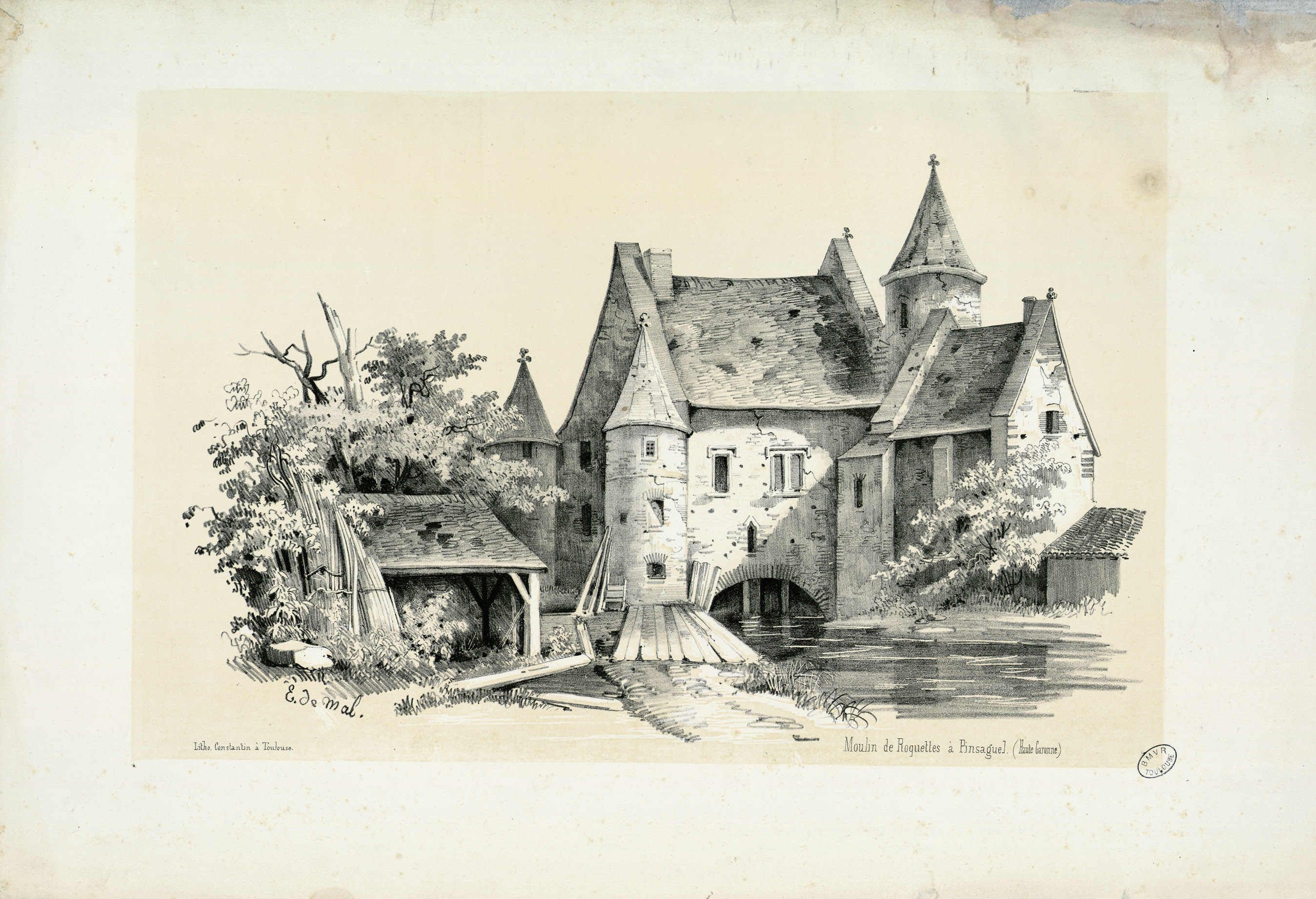
Moulin de Roquettes (Haute Garonne)

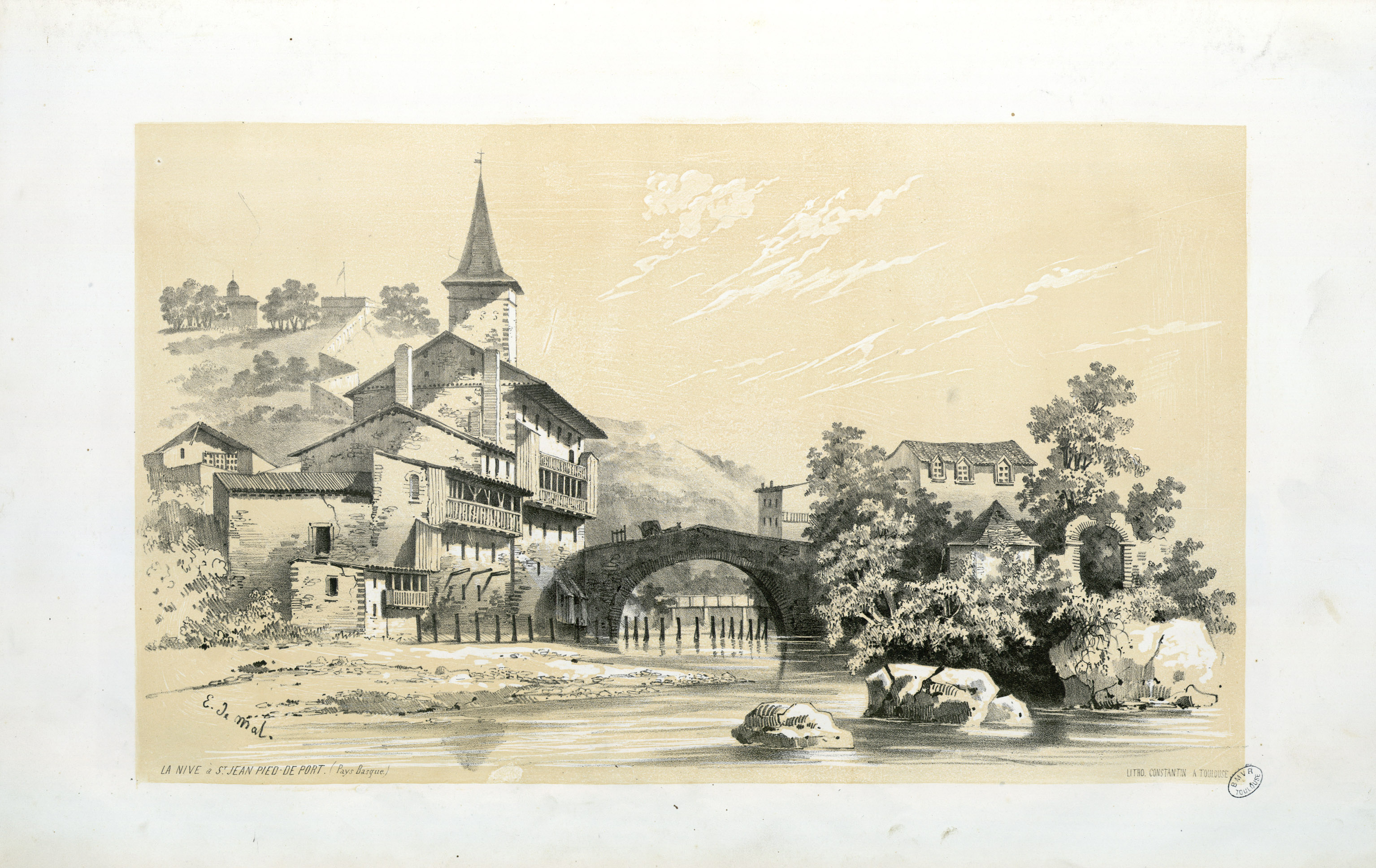
La Nive à St Jean-Pied-de-Port (Pays Basque)

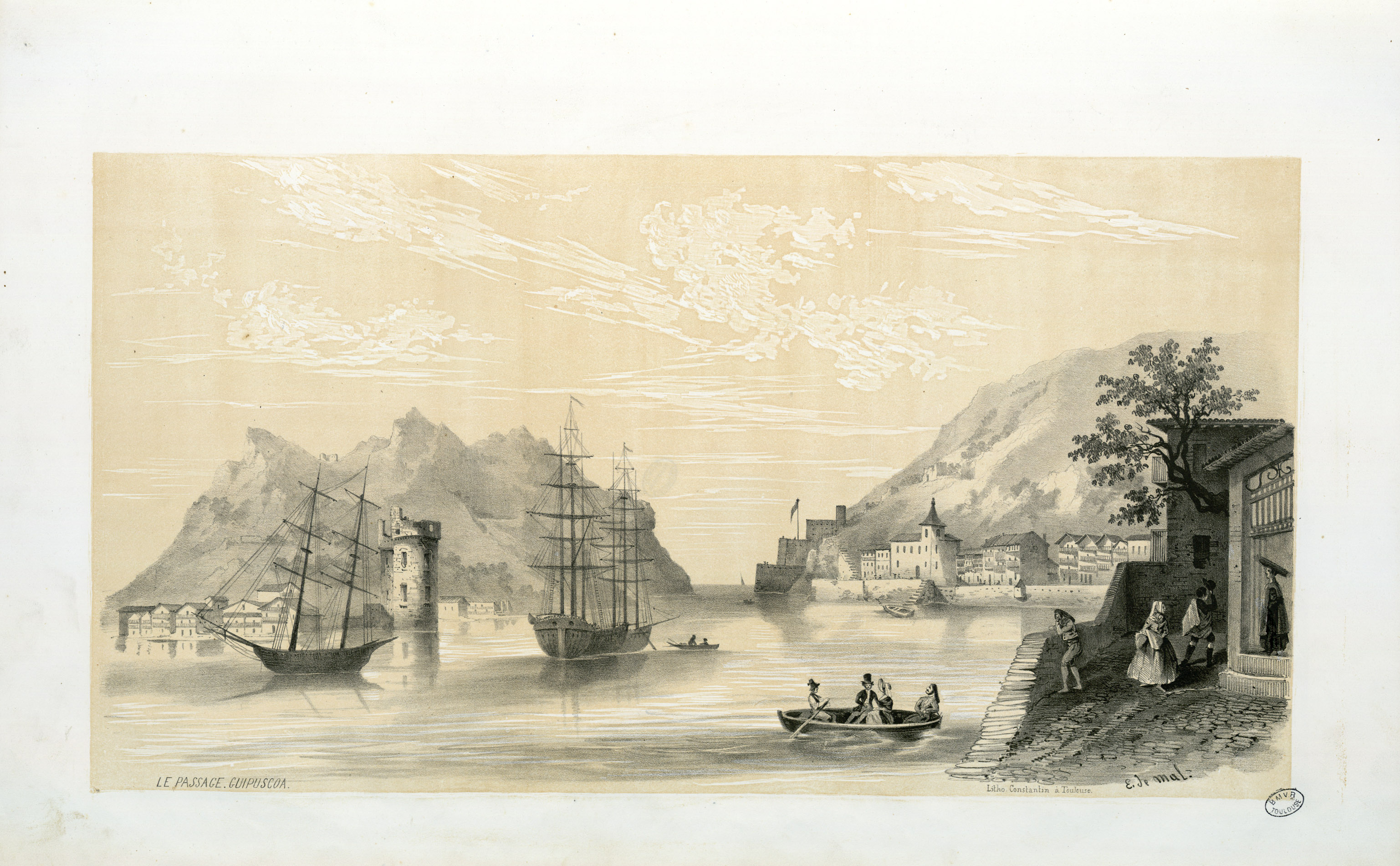
Le passage - Guipuscoa
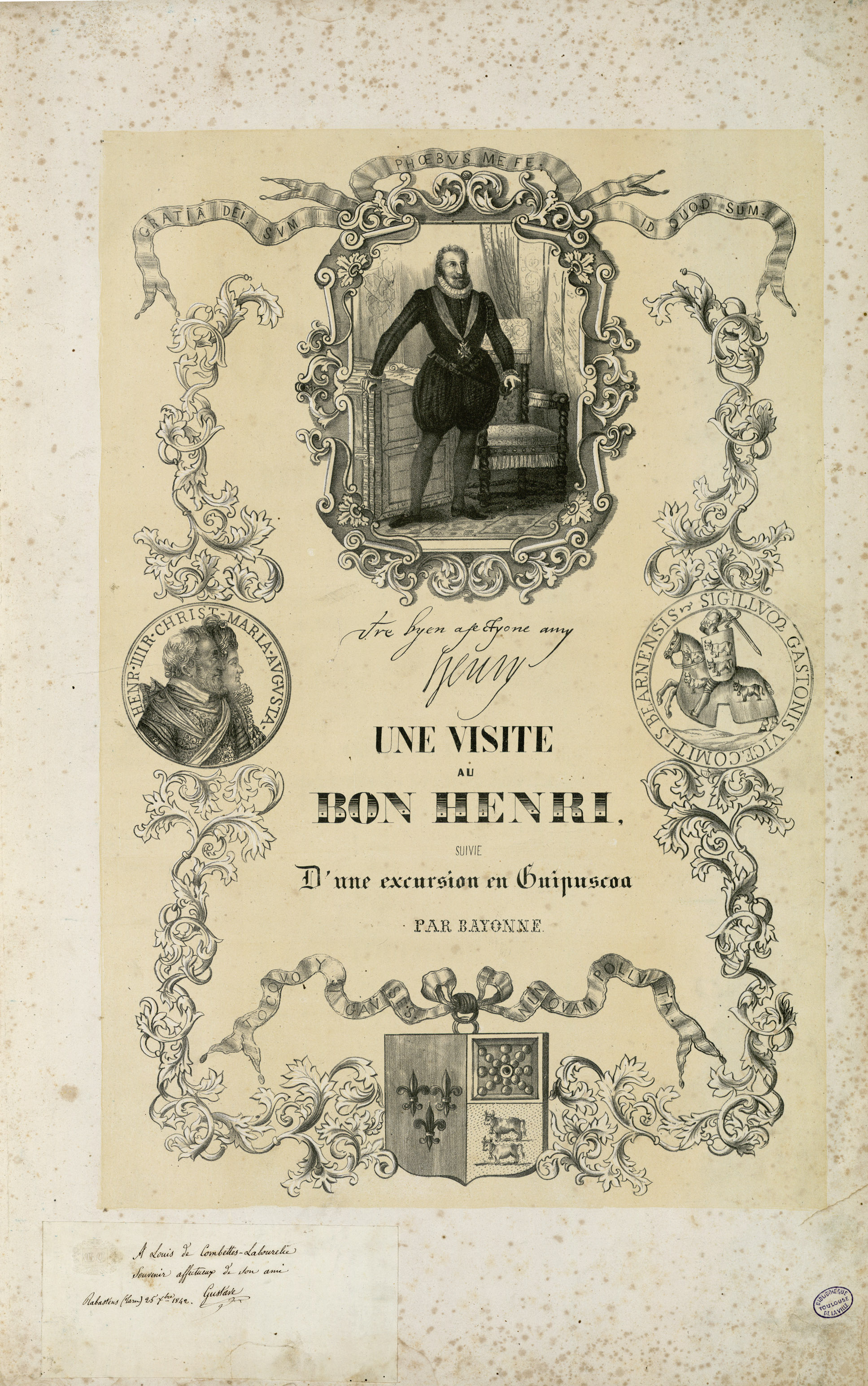
Une visite au bon Henri, suivie d'une excursion en Guipuscon par Bayonne.

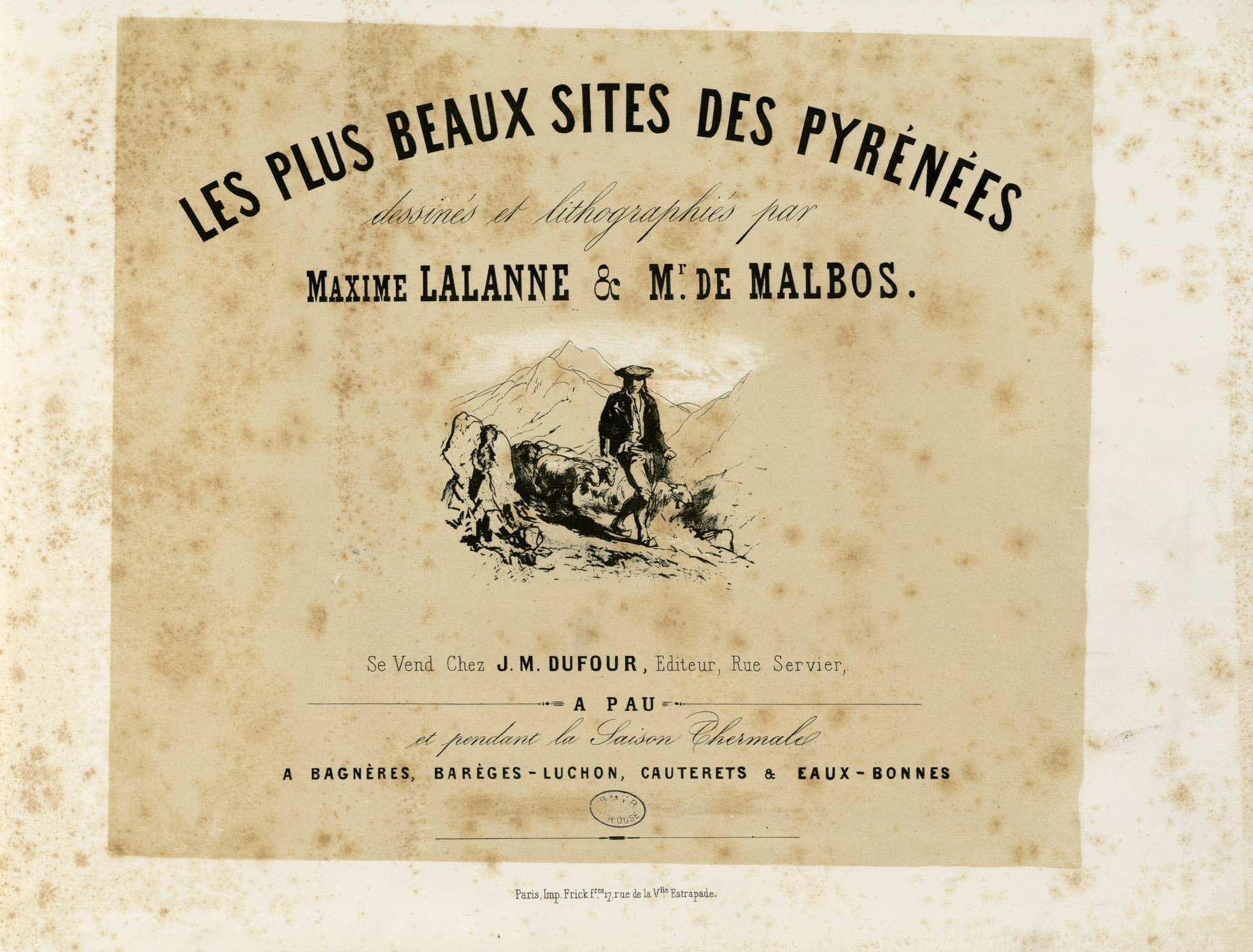
Les plus beaux sites des Pyrénées

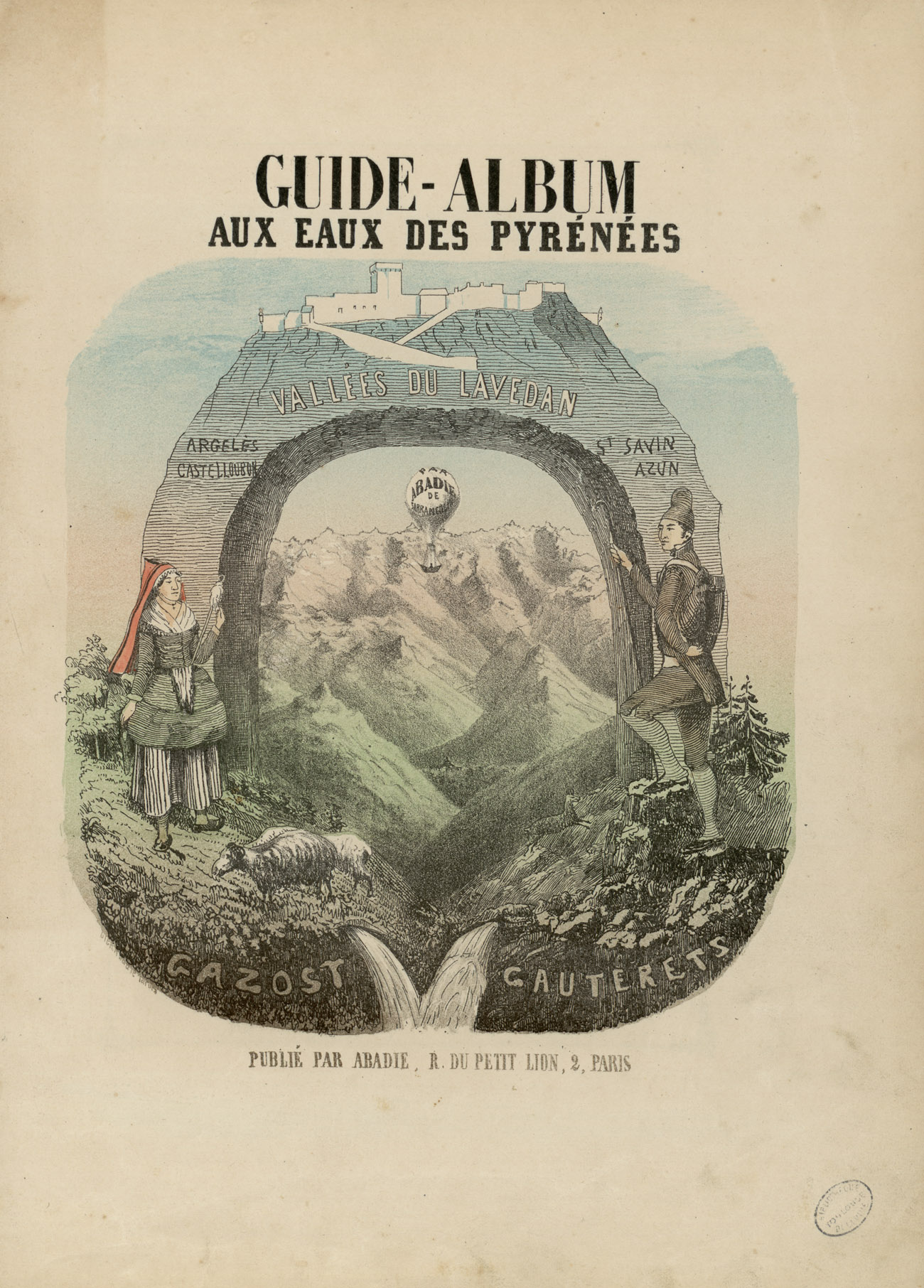
Guide-album aux eaux des Pyrénées, Vallées du Lavedan

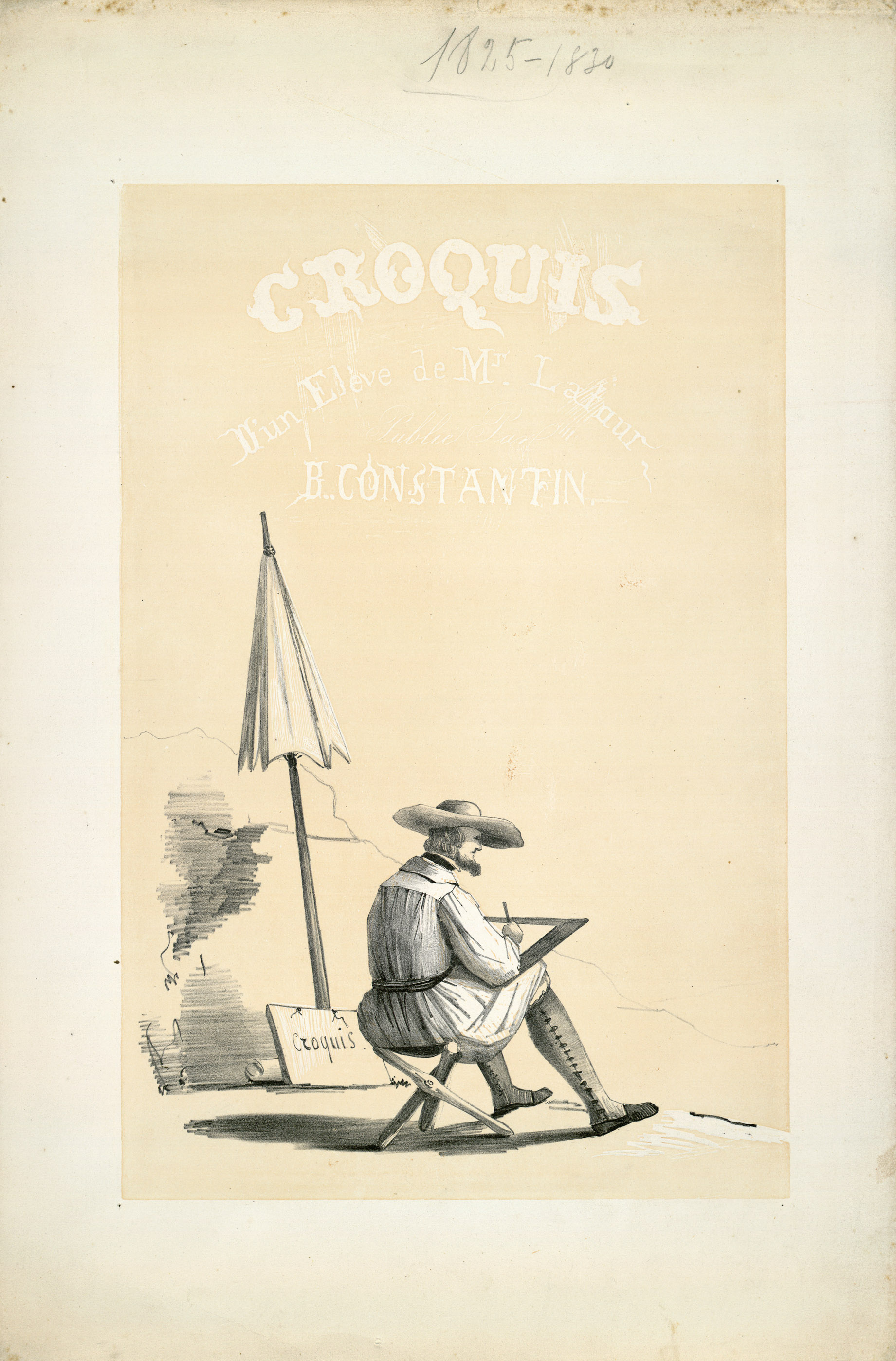
Croquis d'un élève de M. Latour
