= Montalbán, Carabobo =

Montalbán
- Coat of arms

- Location in Venezuela
- Coordinates: 10°15′8″N 68°18′7″W
- Country: Venezuela
- State: Carabobo
- Municipality: Montalbán
- Elevation: 670 m (2,200 ft)

Population (2011)
  - Total: 24,908
- Time zone: UTC−4 (VET)

Montalbán is a town in Venezuela, capital of the Montalbán Municipality in Carabobo.
