= Montalbán Municipality =

Montalbán Municipality Municipio Montalbán
- Municipality
- Flag Coat of arms

- Location in Carabobo

- Location in Venezuela
- Coordinates: 10°11′09″N 68°19′23″W
- Country: Venezuela
- State: Carabobo
- Municipal seat: Montalbán

Government
  - Mayor: José Soto León (Derecha Democrática Popular)

Area
  - Total: 172.2 km^{2} (66.5 sq mi)

Population (2011)
  - Total: 24,908
  - Density: 144.6/km^{2} (374.6/sq mi)
- Time zone: UTC−4 (VET)
- Area code(s): 0249
- Website: Official website

The Montalbán Municipality is one of the 14 municipalities (municipios) that makes up the Venezuelan state of Carabobo and, according to the 2011 census by the National Institute of Statistics of Venezuela, the municipality has a population of 24,908. The town of Montalbán is the shire town of the Montalbán Municipality.

== Demographics ==
The Montalbán Municipality, according to a 2007 population estimate by the National Institute of Statistics of Venezuela, has a population of 23,712 (up from 20,559 in 2000). This amounts to 1.1% of the state's population. The municipality's population density is 221.61 inhabitants per square kilometre (574.0/sq mi).

== Government ==
The mayor of the Montalbán Municipality is Luis Sánchez, elected on November 23, 2008, with 44% of the vote. He replaced Tulio Salvatierra Salazar shortly after the elections. The municipality is divided into one parish (Montalbán).
