= Montalbán, Caracas =

Coordinates: 10°28′N 66°57′W

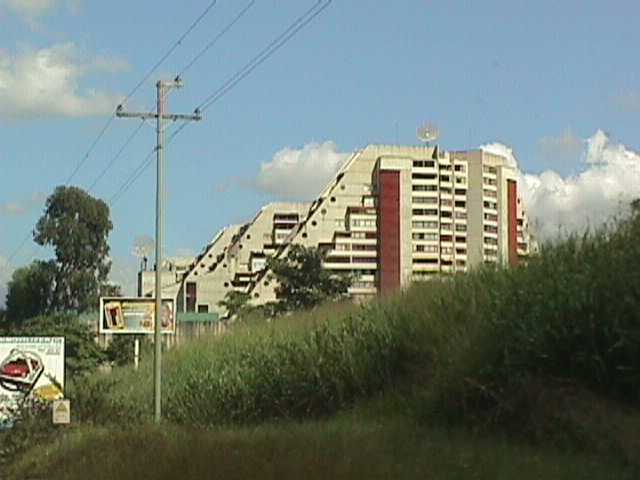
John Paul II housing complex in Montalbán

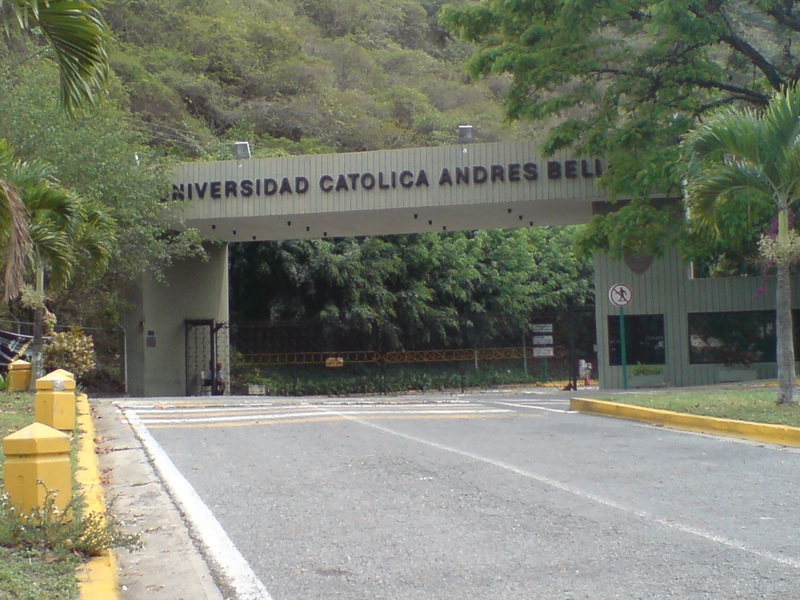
Entrance to Andrés Bello Catholic University

Montalbán is a neighborhood of Caracas belonging to the parroquia of La Vega, in Libertador Bolivarian Municipality. It borders the parishes El Paraíso and Antímano.
