= Maxime Lalanne =

French artist (1827–1886)

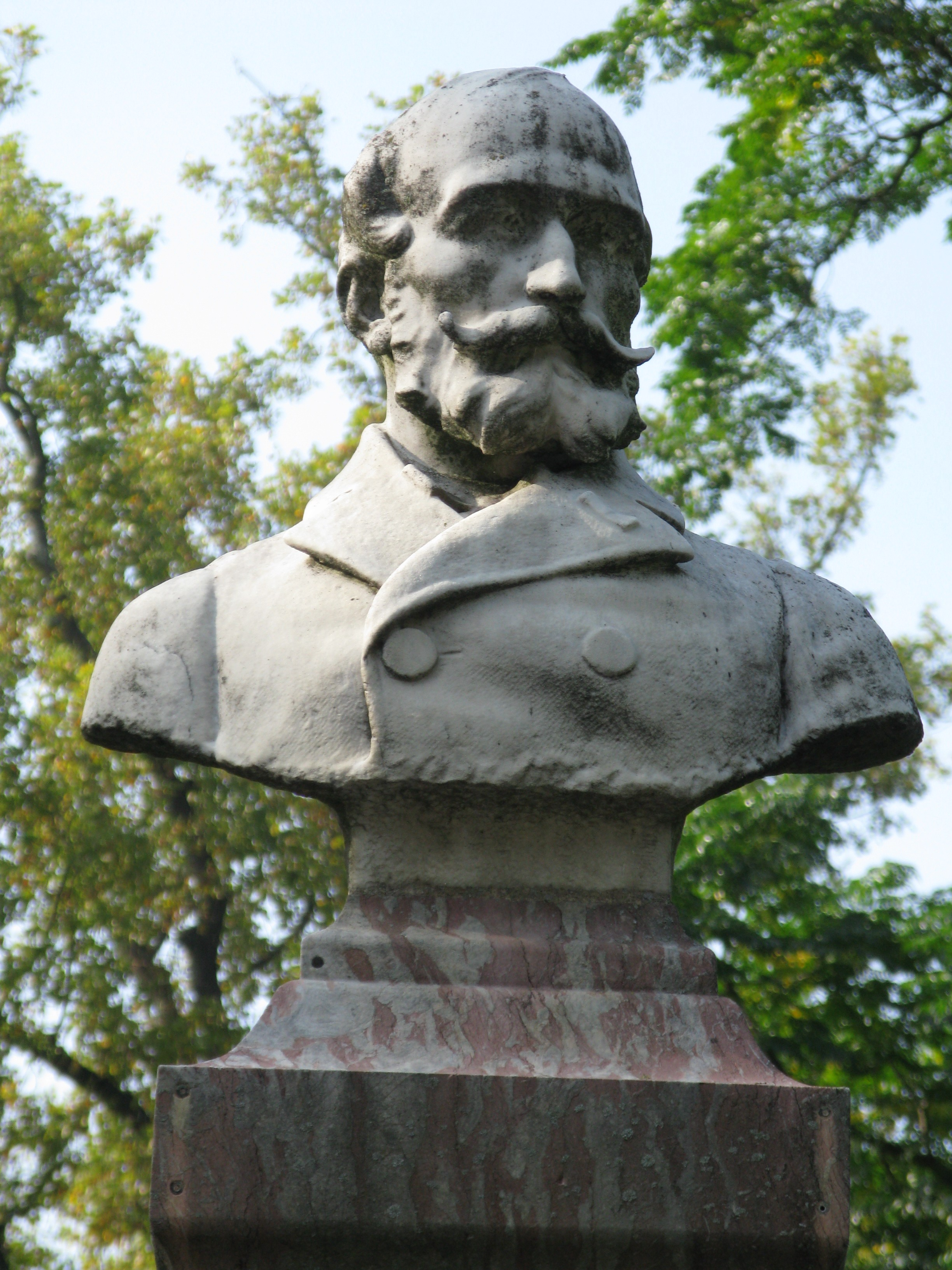
Bust of Lalanne in the Jardin botanique de Bordeaux

François Antoine Maxime Lalanne (November 27, 1827 – July 29, 1886) was a French artist known for his etchings and charcoal drawings (fusain).

== Early life ==
Maxime Lalanne was born in Bordeaux on November 27, 1827, to Anne (previously Anne Cecile Gellibert) and Antoine Lalanne. His father was a civil servant who rose to the position of clerk of the first chamber of the Court of Appeals.

Maxime Lalanne first pursued classical and traditional studies at the l'institution Oré, where he learned drawing from Saulnier. He received his Bachelor of Letters degree in 1848. Although his artistic talent was noted by his comrades and teachers, Lalanne pursued a career in law rather than in art.

== Entry into artistic career ==
Lalanne drew in his spare time, perhaps under Fozembas, while clerking as a notary. In 1850, he exhibited six drawings (pencils and pastels) at the eighth Exposition of the Philomathique Society in the Palais de Justice. The prodigious Léo Drouyn noticed his work and urged him to persevere. Reporting on these works, the newspaper La Tribune described him as "richly gifted" and his drawing as "first rate". Lalanne was awarded a bronze medal for his work.

Shortly thereafter, Lalanne vacationed in Cénon and returned to Bordeaux with dozens of charcoal drawings of the countryside which, Marionneau reported, were remarkable. His friends encouraged him to abandon his law studies and to pursue his art exclusively.

== Move to Paris ==
In 1852, Lalanne followed their advice and left Bordeaux for Paris and the studio of Jean François Gigoux (with whom Lalanne remained close throughout his life). Lalanne's ties to Bordeaux remained strong: he exhibited 640 works there in a retrospective in 1874 and donated proofs of all his etchings to the city in 1875 and 1882. But regardless of those ties, Lalanne became and remained a Paris artist who lived, worked and taught chiefly in Paris until retiring to Nogent-sur-Marne in 1885.

Lalanne made his appearance at the Salon in Paris in 1852 with two charcoal drawings, which he continued to submit throughout his career. Charcoal had only been recently recognized by the Salon as an independent category, and was very popular for both its novelty and expressiveness. Lalanne's reputation in the medium is evidenced by his well-received treatise on the subject, Le Fusain. The importance of drawing to Lalanne is without doubt — at his death the number of Lalanne's drawings in public and private hands exceeded 1200.

== Prints ==
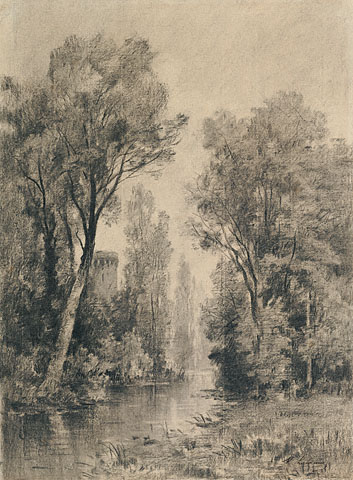
Castle overlooking a River

Lalanne's print debut was in 1853—in lithography rather than etching. Lalanne began etching for Alfred Cadart in 1862 as one of the founding members of Cadart's 160-member Société des Aquafortistes (formed in September 1862), and his work was among the first published and distributed by the Société – Rue des Marmousets (published in November 1862 as plate 15). Lalanne made his etching debut at the Salon in 1863, submitting three street scenes (all of which would appear in Cadart publications).

Lalanne's etchings struck a chord. He received awards from the Salon for etching in 1866, 1873 (3ème classe), 1874 (3éme classe) and was decorated as Chevalier de la Légion d’Honneur in 1875. He was also knighted as Chevalier of the Order of Christ by King Fernando of Portugal (who, perhaps not surprisingly, was one of the 160 members of Cadart's Société des Aquafortistes).

Lalanne arrived on the scene at an opportune moment, for both himself and for the Cadart publishing house. During the 20-year period in which they worked together (from 1862 to 1881), Lalanne produced over 145 etchings, and the Cadart house issued over 80 of them (often more than once) in numerous Cadart publications.

While the impressionists were rebelling against artistic convention and the Salon, Lalanne remained ever faithful to it, and the Salon accepted and exhibited over 120 etchings by Lalanne from 1863 to 1886. It was because of this loyalty (and the resulting friendships) that Lalanne continued to be a member of the jury of the Salon, for painting, even (according to Marionneau) after illness prevented his full participation.

== Illness and death ==
That illness was Lalanne's 10-year struggle with osteomalacia, a crippling bone disease that causes bone softness and disintegration.

Lalanne continued working until he died, with charcoal in his hand, on 29 July 1886, shortly after completing a drawing for his cousin, the author Leopold Lalanne.

He was buried in Nogent-sur-Marne on August 1. His remains were moved on September 25, 1889, to the vault reserved for artists in Bordeaux. A monument by Pierre Granet was erected in the public garden in Bordeaux on June 26, 1897. Only the pedestal and bust remain (its bronze having been pillaged by the Nazis).

== Work ==
The recognition of Lalanne's artistic vision has sometimes been crowded out by his self-evident technical skill. His Traité de la gravure à l’eau-forte instructed generations from its first printing in 1866 through at least 12 editions to 2010. John Taylor Arms, an etcher of peculiar technical attentiveness and intricacy, took his instruction and inspiration from Lalanne. James McBey and Ernest S. Lumsden also taught themselves to etch from Lalanne's treatise.

Lalanne taught and demonstrated almost every conceivable technique applicable to the etching plate, but in his own work he remained an almost steadfast adherent to pure line. It is as if anything but pure line was clutter to Lalanne and his worlds. Except for demonstrations, there are no extant examples of pure drypoint in Lalanne's oeuvre. Lalanne saw drypoint as a tool to correct "mistakes" as explained in his treatise (though he himself sometimes deviated). Although he clearly knew the atmospheric value of aquatint, only one confirmed example of his use of the medium exists – and only on one quadrant of a plate. Similarly, only one soft ground etching comes down from Lalanne (apart from demonstrations).

Lalanne knew how to command line alone to say precisely what he wanted to say. He accomplished that result through multi-stage biting: a continuing process that created, through line variance, every atmospheric element he desired. The rest was left to (occasional) burnishing, drypoint corrections/additions, and surface tone – a critical element to Lalanne.

Subjecting plates to numerous progressive bitings, Lalanne achieved a warmth, depth and dimensionality never before seen in etching, and rarely seen since, as a review of some of his work demonstrates. Through multi-stage biting, À Bordeaux drives the viewer from the dark and rich boat and boathouse in the foreground through the harbor to the distant town in a near infinite visual horizon. Through seven identifiable levels of biting, Rade de Bordeaux (Bordeaux, Effet de Neige) creates a blanket of vista that wraps the viewer in a surrounded sense of stillness and snow. In Une Rue de Rouen, the dominance of the cathedral in the background is established not through bold line but through scant biting. In Bords de la Tamise, Lalanne does the near impossible: he creates fog through multi-stage biting alone. Lalanne produced over 200 etchings, but even if had completed only these four, his place in history as a technical genius would have been secured.

Using realistic elements as a vehicle, Lalanne's etchings organize the visual field into a new order of unrelenting harmony, consistent with the subject, that fosters access to the image whose sense of place inspired the work. This would have been branded as a dance too close to the heretical edges of impressionism had it been perceived at the time, but it was not. Critics stumbled close to this reckoning, but never quite reached it.

Lalanne did not use etching to make social, political or even artistic statements, but rather let the world speak for itself. People play only a small role in Lalanne's world. Even in Lalanne's volume on Victor Hugo, the author Hugo is no more important than the plants in the garden, and seems crowded and overtaken by them.

Lalanne had his share of failures. Le Rocher de Sisteron, Vittel and Vue des Ruines du Château de Fère, for example, come across as two dimensional amateur exercises with little to commend them. The Crisenoy suite is technically astute but completely vacant, and the same can be said for the six plates that may have been destined for a book on architecture.

Those failures are nevertheless instructive. Against complaints that Lalanne was generally without depth and warmth, these works make it easy to tell when he was, and when he was not. Moreover, they permit us to isolate an additional element of continuity that stretches across all works. At a time when the etching plate was increasing in size, wall display was becoming more pervasive, and the intimacy of etching was at risk, even in his failures Lalanne attempts to draw the viewer closer to establish the connection that is historically fundamental to etching. This continuous predisposition is all the more evident in Lalanne's largely unpublished oeuvre of smaller works and miniatures. It is simply impossible to experience most of these works except in close quarters. One of these etchings, Jardin avec statue au bord d’une piêce d’eau, is among the best in Lalanne's entire oeuvre.

== Bibliography ==
- Bailly-Herzberg, Janine, L’eau-forte de peintre au dix-neuvieme siecle: la Societe des Aquafortistes 1862–1867 (Paris: Laget 1972), v. 2, pp. 124–27
- Bailly-Herzberg, Janine, Dictionnaire de l’estampe en France 1830–1950 (Flammarion 1985), pp. 175–76.
- Beraldi, Henri, Les Graveurs du XIX Siecle (Paris: L. Conquet 1889), v. IX, pp. 18–23.
- Bradley, William Aspenwall, Maxime Lalanne, Print Collector's Quarterly, v.3, No. 1 (Feb. 1913), pp. 70–85, reprinted in Print-Collectors' Booklets: Maxime Lalanne (Boston: Houghton Mifflin 1914), and in French Etchers of the Second Empire (Boston: Houghton Mifflin 1916), pp. 30–40.
- Delteil, Loys, Maxime Lalanne, The Print Connoisseur, v. III, No. 4 (Oct. 1923), pp. 390–403.
- Fisher, Jay M., Maxime Lalanne, The Technique of Etching, A Reprint (New York: Dover 1981) (Intro.)
- Grad, Bonnie Lee and Timothy A. Riggs, Prints and Photographs of Nineteenth Century France (Washington, D.C.: National Gallery of Art 1982), pp. 129–32.
- Guérin, Anne, Redécouverte d’un Artiste Bordelais: Maxime Lalanne, dessinateur, graveur et peintre, [extract from dissertation, Univ. of Bordeaux III], Société Archéologique de Bordeaux, T. LXXVI, 1985, pp. 129–34.
- Gutekunst, Richard, Catalogue of the Etched Work of Maxime Lalanne (London: R. Gutekunst 1905) (exhibition catalogue plus inventory list of 196 items, 20 in multiple states, unillustrated).
- Hamerton, Philip G., Etching & Etchers, all editions, viz. 3rd ed. (London: MacMillan 1880), pp. 156–60.
- Huneker, James G., Promenades of an Impressionist (NY: Scribner's 1910) (reprinted) (Chpt. X).
- Keppel, Frederick, The Print Collector's Bulletin: Maxime Lalanne (New York: De Vinne Press 1908) (reprinted with additions 1909)
- Keppel, Frederick, The Golden Age of Engraving (New York: De Vinne Press 1910), p. 162-64.
- Kovler, Marjorie, Forgotten Printmakers of the 19th Century (Chicago: Kovler 1967), pp. 114–15.
- Lalanne, Maxime, Traite de la Gravure a L'eau-Forte (all editions) (Paris: Cadart et Luquet 1866)
- Lalanne, Maxime, Le Fusain (Paris: Berville, 5 editions between 1866 and 1875).
- Laran, Jean, et al., Inventaire du Fonds Francais apres 1800 (Paris: Bibliothèque Nationale 1932 et seq.), v. 12, pp. 272–282 (Lalanne catalogued by Jacques Lethève).
- Leipnik, F.L., A History of French Etching (London: John Lane 1924), pp. 115–16.
- Marionneau, Charles, Lalanne, Peintre, Dessinateur, Graveur-Aqua-Fortiste 1827–1886 (Bordeaux: Gounouilhou 1886) (extrait de la Gironde littéraire et scientifique du 29 août 1886).
- Pennell, Joseph, Etchers and Etchings, all editions, viz. 4th ed. (New York: MacMillan 1936), p. 192
- Pennell, Joseph, Pen Drawing and Pen Draughtsmen (New York: MacMillan 1920), p. 92 .
- Taormina, John, Maxime Lalanne: Drawings and Prints (Art Museum, College of Wooster 1979).
- Villet, Jeffrey M., The Complete Prints of Maxime Lalanne, catalogue raisonné, lithographs and etchings (St. Petersburg FL: 2016), (earlier edition 2010); The Etchings of Maxime Lalanne, a Catalogue Raisonné (Washington, D.C.: art@home fine prints 2003 (1st ed.)(superseded) and 2006 (revised 2nd ed.)(superseded)).
- Weisberg, Gabriel P., and R.L. Zakon, Between Past and Present: French, English and American Etchings 1850–1950 (The Cleveland Museum of Art 1977)
- Weisberg, Gabriel P., The Etching Renaissance in France 1850–1880 (Utah Museum of Fine Arts, 1971).
- Weston, William, Etchings by Maxime Lalanne (cat. 11) (London: William Weston Gallery 1975).
