= Pique (river) =

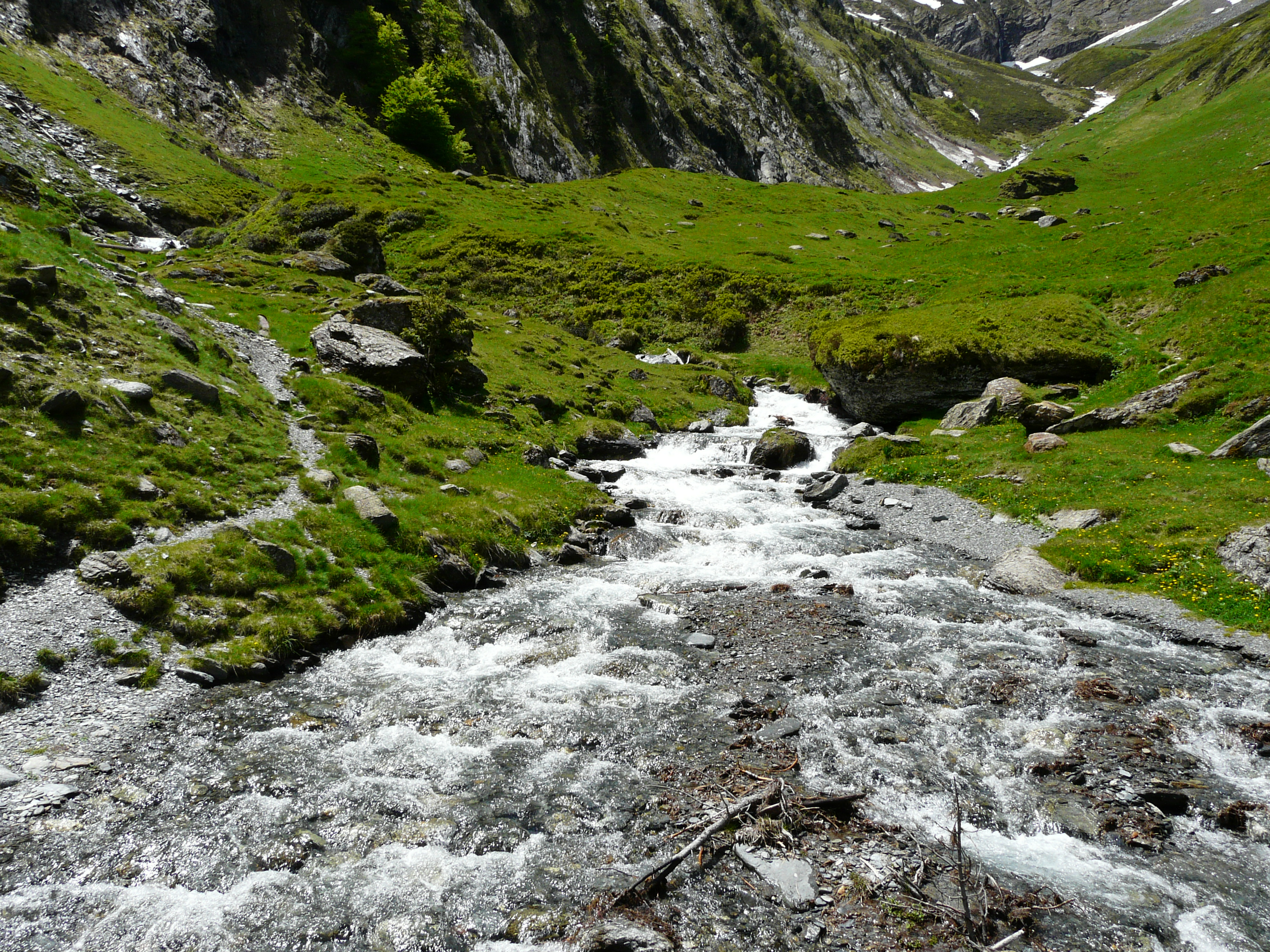
- The Pique near its source

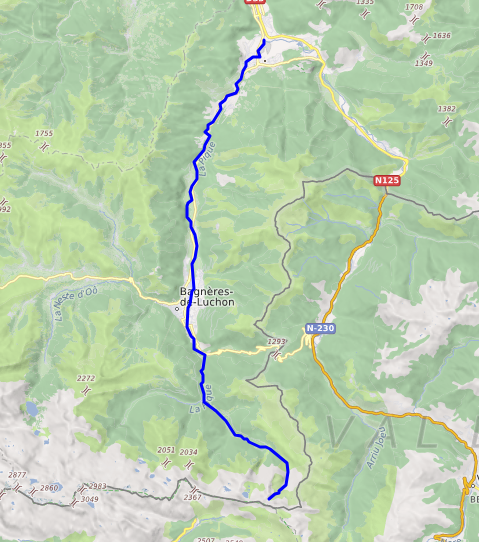

Location
- Country: France

Physical characteristics
- Source
  - location: Pyrenees
  - elevation: ± 1,400 m (4,600 ft)
- Mouth
  - location: Garonne
  - coordinates: 42°55′35″N 0°39′5″E
- Length: 33 km (21 mi)
- Basin size: 3,860 km^{2} (1,490 sq mi)

Basin features
- Progression: Garonne→ Gironde estuary→ Atlantic Ocean

The Pique (French pronunciation: [pik]; Occitan: Espada) is a 33 km long river in southern France, left tributary of the Garonne. Its source is in the Pyrenees, on the north side of the Port de Venasque mountain pass. It flows generally northward, entirely within the Haute-Garonne département. It passes through the resort town Bagnères-de-Luchon and Cierp-Gaud. It flows into the Garonne in Chaum.
