= Cierp-Gaud =

- Commune
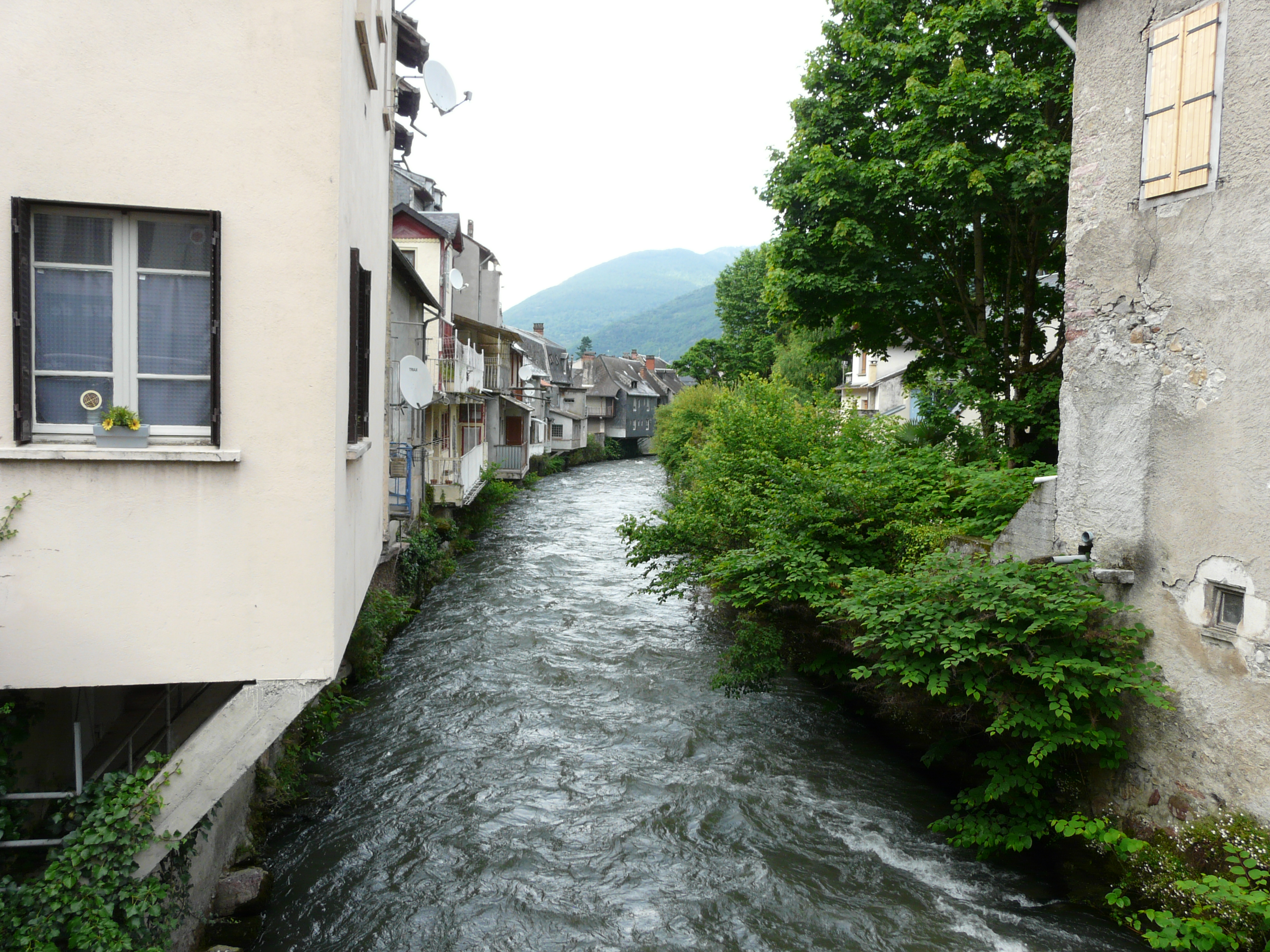
- The Pique river in Cierp-Gaud

- Coat of arms
- Location of Cierp-Gaud
- Location within France Location within Occitanie
- Coordinates: 42°54′59″N 0°38′22″E
- Country: France
- Region: Occitania
- Department: Haute-Garonne
- Arrondissement: Saint-Gaudens
- Canton: Bagnères-de-Luchon
- Intercommunality: Pyrénées Haut Garonnaises

Government
  - Mayor (2022–2026): Claude Guiard
- Area^{1}: 13.90 km^{2} (5.37 sq mi)
- Highest elevation: 1,840 m (6,040 ft)
- Lowest elevation: 460 m (1,510 ft)
- Population (2023): 689
  - Density: 49.6/km^{2} (128/sq mi)
- Time zone: UTC+01:00 (CET)
  - Summer (DST): UTC+02:00 (CEST)
- INSEE/Postal code: 31144 /31440
- ^{1} French Land Register data, which excludes lakes, ponds, glaciers > 1 km^{2} (0.386 sq mi or 247 acres) and river estuaries.

Cierp-Gaud is a commune in the Haute-Garonne department in southwestern France.

== Population ==
Historical population
Year	Pop.	±% p.a.
1968	954	—
1975	950	−0.06%
1982	944	−0.09%
1990	990	+0.60%
1999	862	−1.53%
2007	910	+0.68%
2012	807	−2.37%
2017	734	−1.88%
2023	689	−1.05%
Source: INSEE

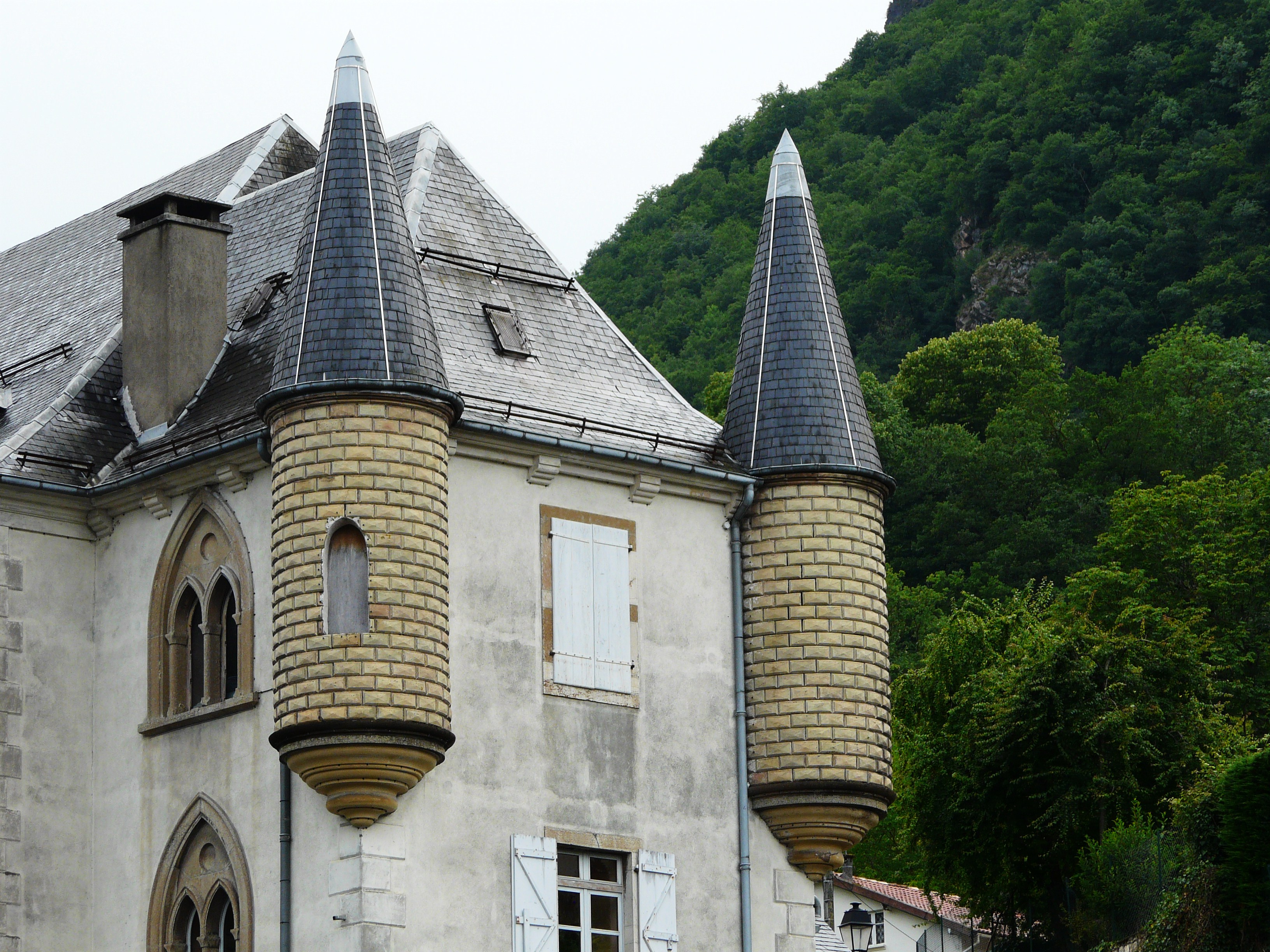
castle

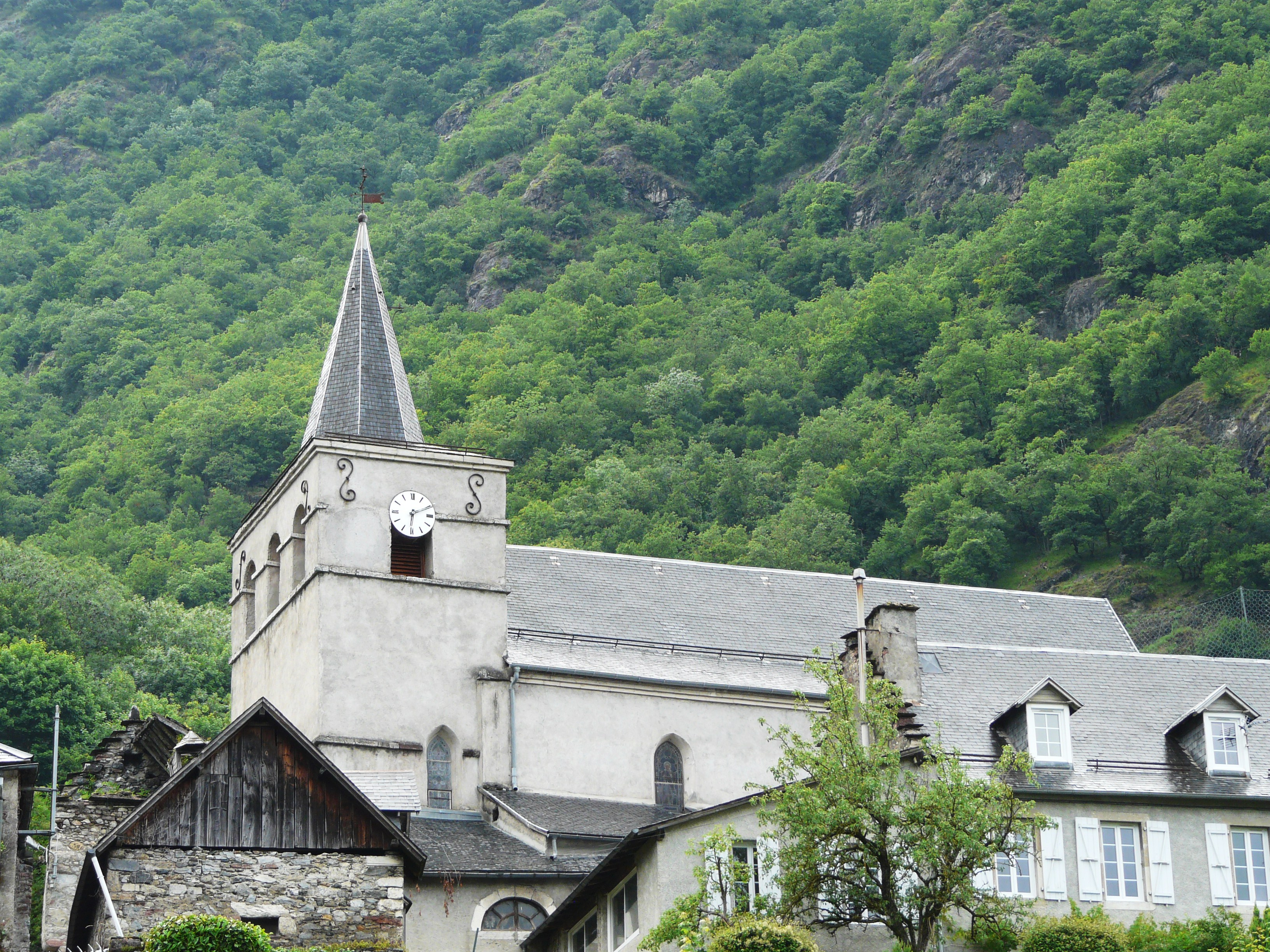
church

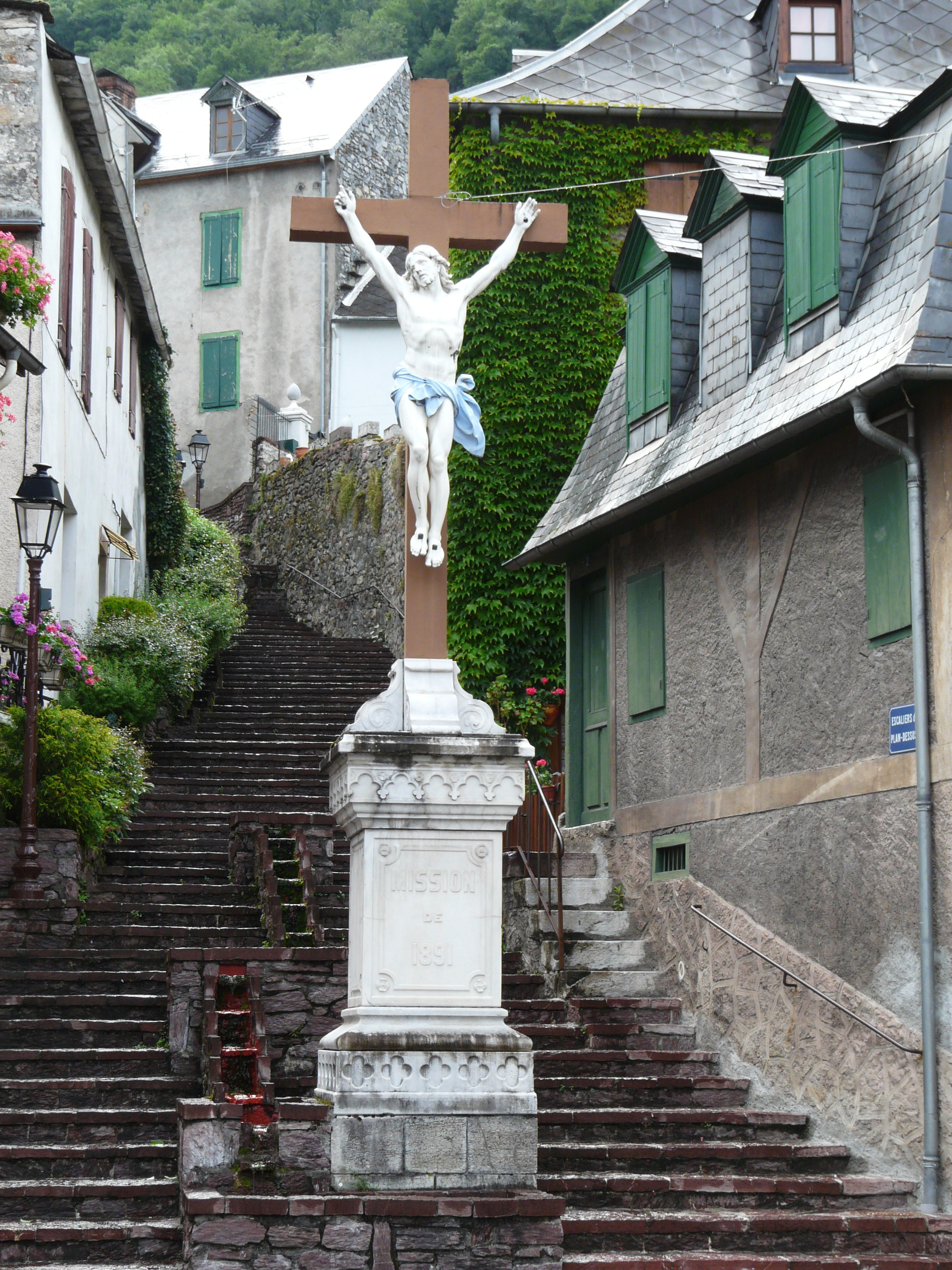
mission cross

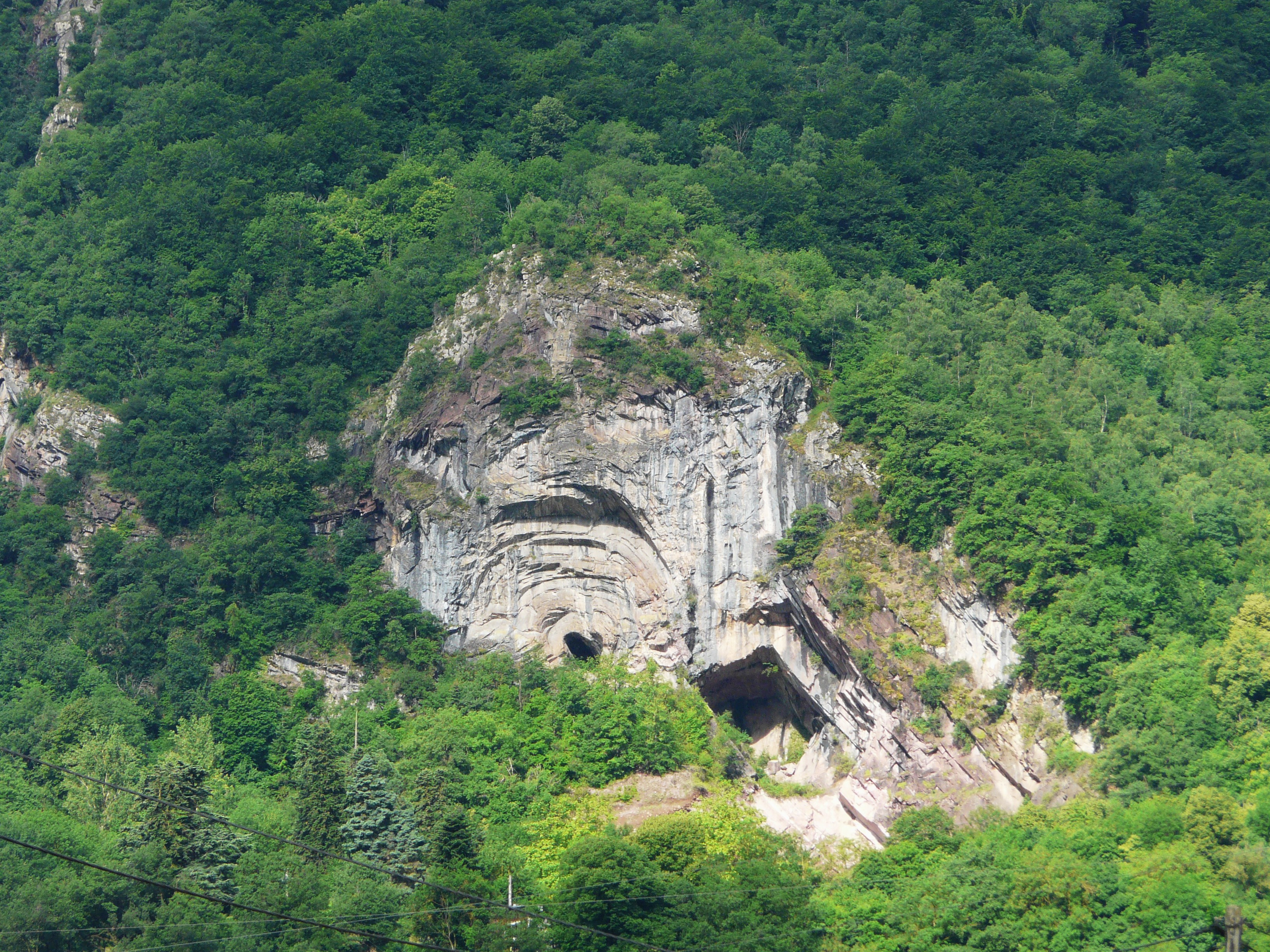
rocks above the village

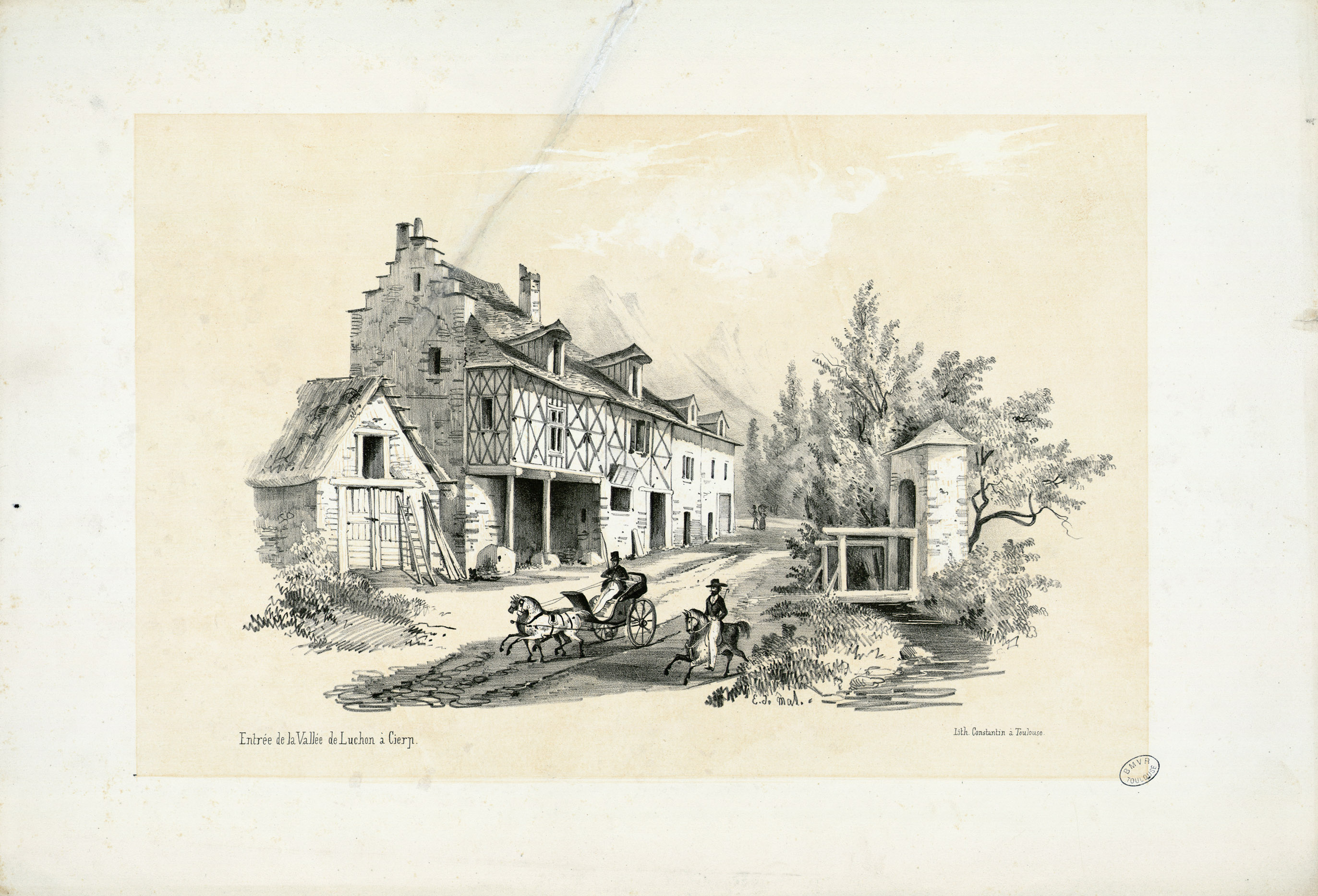
Cierp by Eugène de Malbos near 1840

== See also ==
- Communes of the Haute-Garonne department
