= Port de Venasque =

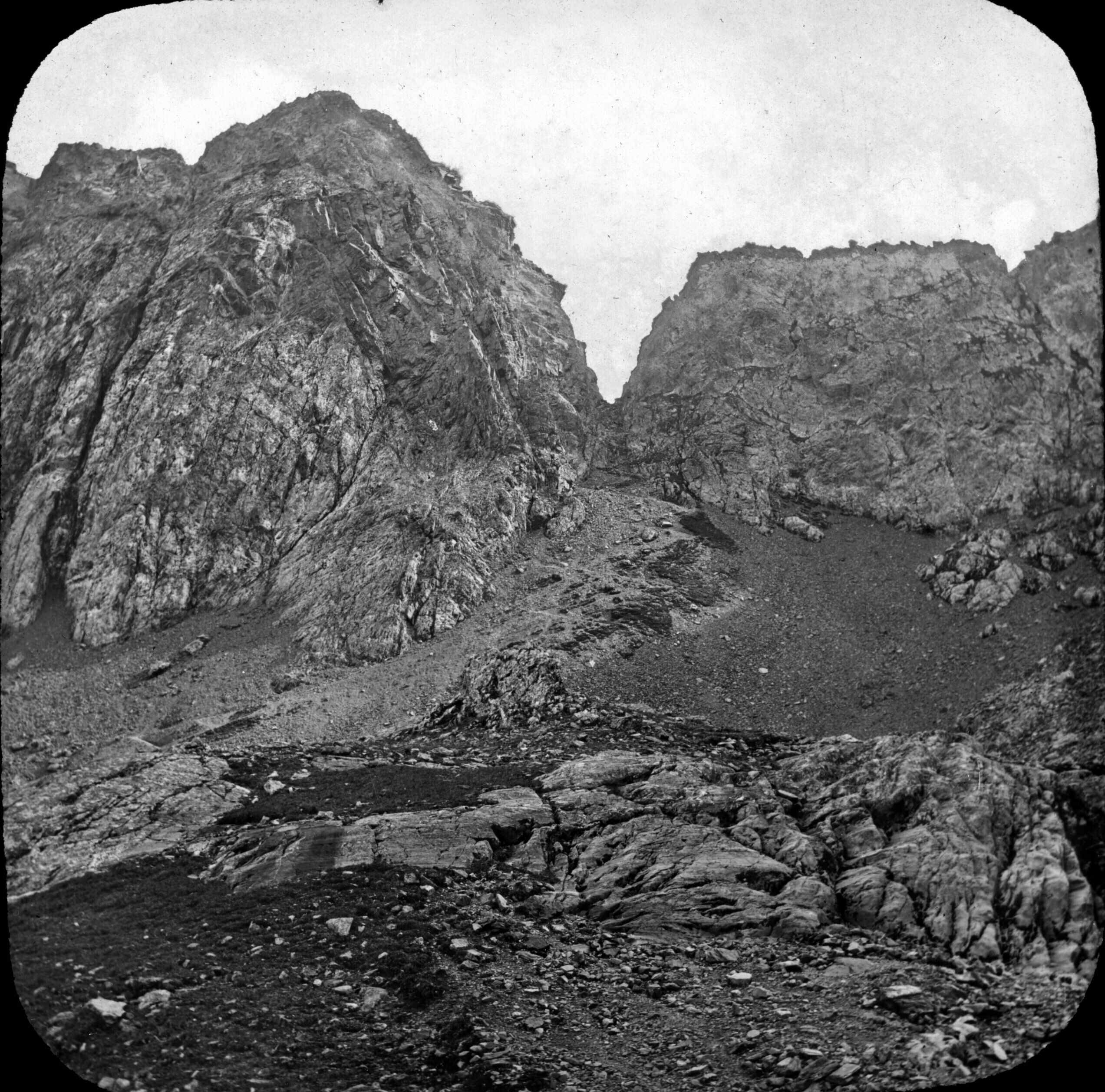
- Port de Vénasque in 1875 by Eugène Trutat

- Location within France
- Elevation: 2,444 m (8,018 ft)

Location
- Location: France–Spain border
- Range: Pyrenees
- Coordinates: 42°41′33″N 0°38′27″E

The Port de Venasque (8,018 feet (2,444 m)) is a mountain pass in the Pyrenees. It lies on the border between France and Spain and is a popular border crossing point for mountaineers and walkers. It can be reached in about two to three hours from the Hospice de France, South of Bagnères-de-Luchon in France.

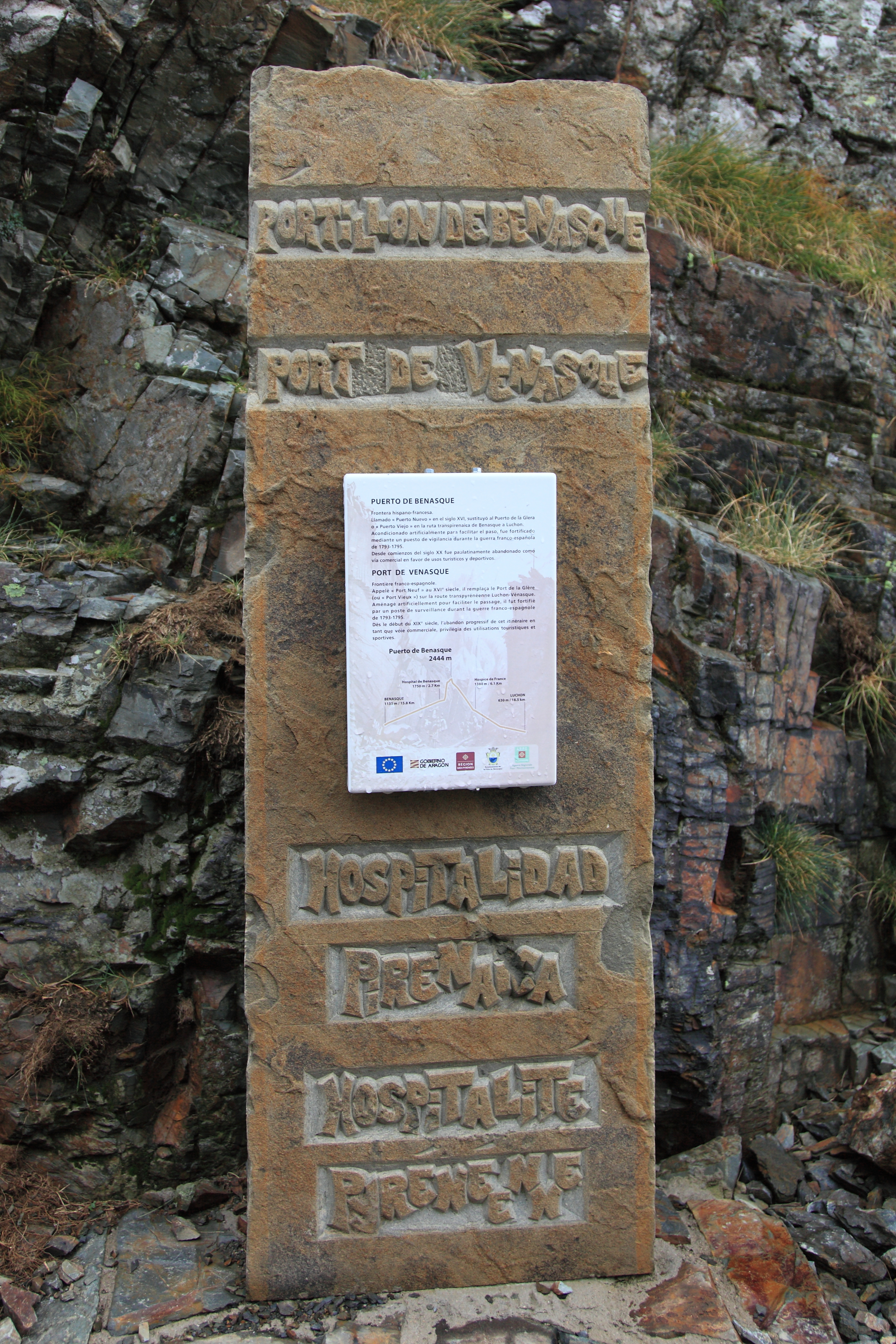
Port de Venasque marker

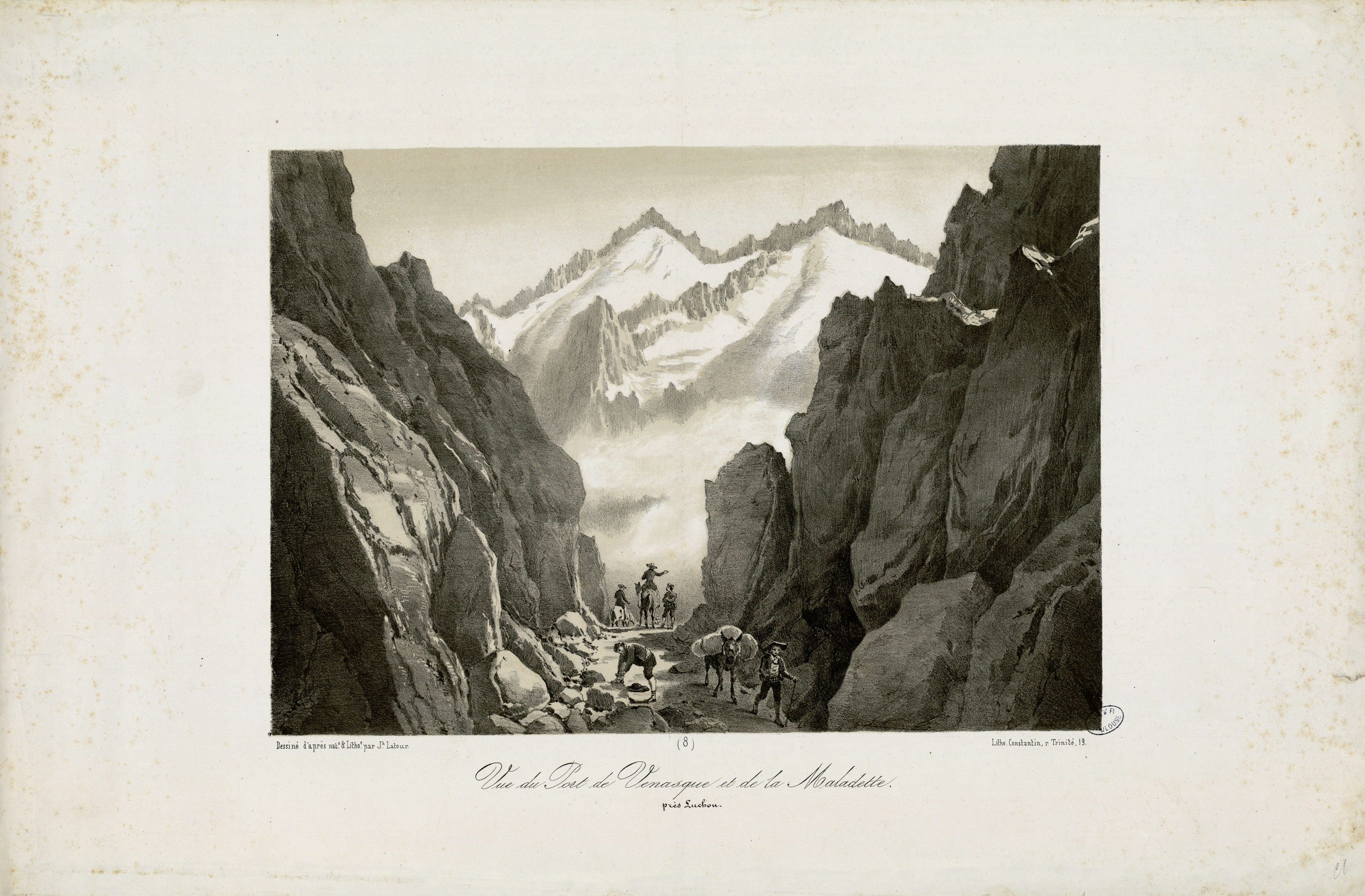
Port de Venasque and Macizo de la Maladeta at the France–Spain border, by Joseph Latour
