= Asson =

- Commune
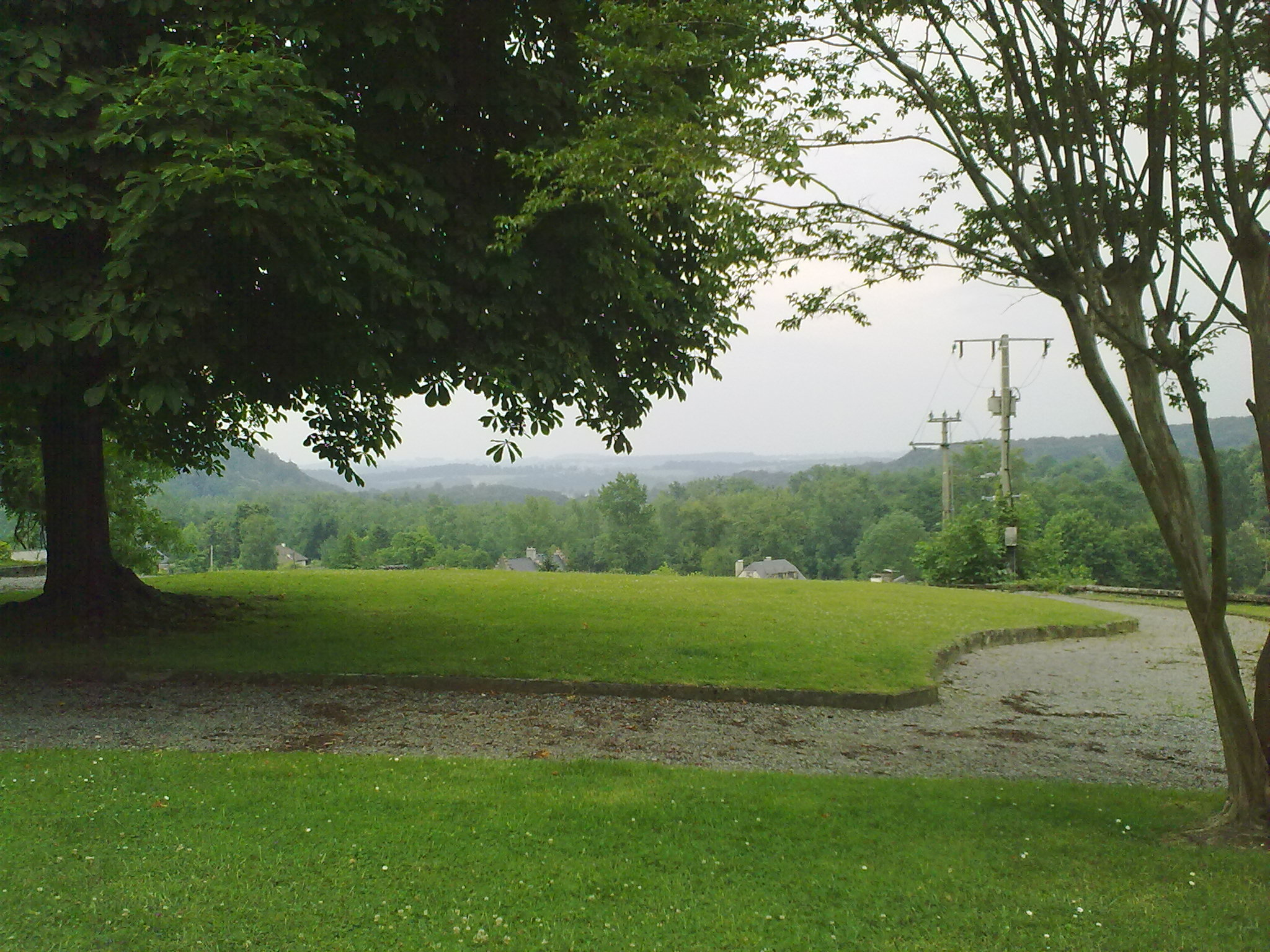
- View from Asson
- Location of Asson
- Location within France Location within Nouvelle-Aquitaine
- Coordinates: 43°08′29″N 0°15′14″W
- Country: France
- Region: Nouvelle-Aquitaine
- Department: Pyrénées-Atlantiques
- Arrondissement: Pau
- Canton: Ouzom, Gave et Rives du Neez
- Intercommunality: CC Pays de Nay

Government
  - Mayor (2020–2026): Marc Canton
- Area^{1}: 83.02 km^{2} (32.05 sq mi)
- Elevation: 330 m (1,080 ft)
- Highest elevation: 1,848 m (6,063 ft)
- Lowest elevation: 255 m (837 ft)
- Population (2023): 1,982
  - Density: 23.87/km^{2} (61.83/sq mi)
- Time zone: UTC+01:00 (CET)
  - Summer (DST): UTC+02:00 (CEST)
- INSEE/Postal code: 64068 /64800
- ^{1} French Land Register data, which excludes lakes, ponds, glaciers > 1 km^{2} (0.386 sq mi or 247 acres) and river estuaries.

Asson (French pronunciation: [asɔ̃]) is a commune in the Pyrénées-Atlantiques department in the Nouvelle-Aquitaine region of south-western France.

== Geography ==
Asson is a large commune in the Ouzom Valley some 30 km south by south-east of Pau and 35 km east by south-east of Oloron-Sainte-Marie which almost completely surrounds the commune of Arthez-d'Asson. The south-eastern border of the commune is the border between the departments of Pyrenees-Atlantiques and Hautes-Pyrénées. Access to the commune is by the D 35 road from Igon in the east which passes through the village and continues west to Bruges-Capbis-Mifaget. The D 36 road comes from Nay in the north to join the D 35 just west of the village. The D 126 road goes south from the village to Arthez-d'Asson. The D 226 branches from the D 126 and goes east by a circuitous route to Lestelle-Betharram. The southern half of the commune is mountainous and heavily forested while the north is farmland with scattered small patches of forest.

The Pyrénées-Atlantiques Interurban Network of buses has a stop in the commune on route 810 from Lys to Pau

=== Hydrography ===
The river Gave de Pau (Adour basin) and its tributaries the Ouzoum and the Béez flow through the commune.

The Ouzoum is fed in Asson by the Ruisseaux of Gerse, Turonnet, de Thouet, le Goulet, d'Incamps, de Berdoulat, and the Arrieucourt which forms the eastern border of the commune (itself fed by the Ruisseau de la Fontaine Béra), and the Hèche, Hau, and Gat. Paul Raymond mentioned in the 1863 dictionary on p. 168 another tributary of the Ouzoum called le Touchet which rose in Asson and Arthez-d'Asson.

The Béez is joined in the commune by the Ruisseaux of Landistou, Trubés (itself fed by the Ruisseau de Marlies), Toupiette, Arrouy, Mourté, Lacot (joined in the commune by the Ruisseau de la Sègue), Jupé, Picas, Coudé, and Soulens.

=== Places and hamlets ===
- Arnaude
- Arrestouilh
- Arrioucourt
- Arrouaus
- Aubuchou
- Ausone
- Barrabourg
- Bascou
- Batailles
- Bélile
- Bellocq (Pass - 437 metres)
- Berdeu
- Berdoulat
- Berduc
- Bernadou
- Bernatas
- Betbeu
- Betcabe
- Betpède
- Bonnehon
- Bourdila
- Bourié
- Brau
- Brouquet
- Brune
- Busoc
- Cabalou
- Carache
- Cassagne
- Cassou
- Castella
- Castet Mauheit
- Castet-Oussès
- Catala
- Cayeré
- Cotbracq
- Cot de Hosse
- Les Courades
- La Courgue
- Les Crabes
- Crouseilles
- Dagues
- Donzelot
- Douasous
- Dourron
- Ermitage d'Asson
- Espagna (ruins)
- Espoune-Carbou
- Estradère
- Fradi
- Gabouil
- Galibet
- Le Garroc Blanc
- Gestou
- Gourgues (vale of)
- Grabot
- Gracié
- Guillamasse
- Herran
- Hourc
- Hourcségou
- Hourquet
- Labarrère (mill)
- Labat
- Labedays
- Labielle
- Lacoume
- Lalanne
- Lamothe
- Lanardonne
- Larban
- Larruhat
- Lartigue
- Lasque
- Latapie (bridge)
- Loustalot
- Luppé (château)
- Mandrou
- Mansiou
- Marcadet
- Massey
- Matocq
- Mesplé
- Milhet
- Monge
- Montguillalou
- Montguillet
- Jean Moulié
- Mounicou
- Nabarrà
- Naspret
- Nérios
- Nougué
- L’Oustau
- Pabine
- Palu
- Pédeprade
- Péré
- Peyrade
- Peyroutet
- Pladepousaux
- Pousaux
- Pradou
- Regourt
- Rouby
- Sanguinet
- Sanguinet (pass - 512 metres)
- Sarrailhé
- Sarraméda
- Sendou
- Teich (pass - 1034 metres)
- Teulère
- Thou
- Thouet
- Touyarou
- Trencade (pass - 1273 metres)

== Toponymy ==
The commune name in béarnais is also Asson. Michel Grosclaude said that the name probably comes from the basque aitz/as ("rocky point") with the locative suffix -on, giving "place where there is a high point".

The following table details the origins of the commune name and other names in the commune.

Name	Spelling	Date	Source	Page	Origin	Description
Asson	Assoo	11th century	Raymond	15	Saint-Pé	Village
	Assonium	1100	Raymond	15	Titles of Mifaget	
	Villa quœ vocatur Asso	12th century	Raymond	15	Lescar	
	Assun	13th century	Raymond	15	Fors de Béarn	
	La vegarie d'Asson	1450	Raymond	15	Cour Majour	
	Saint-Martin d'Asson	1790	Raymond	15		
	Asson		Cassini		Cassini Map 1750	
Abère	Abera	1546	Raymond	2	Reformation	Fief
Arribabès	Arribebes	1675	Raymond	11	Reformation	Hamlet
	Arribabès	1863	Raymond	11		
Arribarrouy	Arribarroy	1675	Raymond	11	Reformation	Hamlet
	Arribarrouy	1863	Raymond	11		
Arribebot	Arribebot	1675	Raymond	11	Reformation	Hamlet
Arriutoulet	Arriutoulet	1863	Raymond	13		Hamlet
Artigaux	Artigaux	1863	Raymond	13		A Hamlet in the area of the former commune of Lestelle
Arrieucourt	Arrioucourt					A stream that rises in Asson and Igon and joins the Ouzom
	Arriucourbe	1863	Raymond	12		
Bataille	L’ariu de Bathalhes	1501	Raymond	24	Notaries of Nay	A stream having its source in Asson and flowing to the Béez
	Le Bataillès	1863	Raymond	24		
Les Bengues	Les Bengues	1675	Raymond	27	Reformation	Hamlet
Brocq	Brocq	1863	Raymond	36		Farm
Cami	L’ostau deu Cami	1385	Raymond	39	Census	Farm
	Cami	1863	Raymond	39		
Castet-Oussès	Castet-Ousses	1863	Raymond	46		The mountains between Asson and Arthez-d'Asson
Claverie	L'ostau de Claveria	1538	Raymond	51	Reformation	Fief
	Claverie	1863	Raymond	51		
Chemin de Clerguet	lo cami Clargues	1536	Raymond	51	Reformation	A path that started at Clarac, crossed Asson and Igon, and was the border between Asson and Nay
	le cami Claragues	1536	Raymond	51	Reformation of Béarn	
	le grant camii aperat Clergues	1547	Raymond	51	Reformation	
	Chemin de Clerguet	1863	Raymond	51		
Couts-Dedans et Couts-Dehors	Fore-Couts	1547	Raymond	53	Reformation	Hamlet
	Cootz	1581	Raymond	53	Reformation of Béarn	
	Dedans-couts et Fore-Couts	1675	Raymond	53	Reformation	
Le chemin d’Estradère	Le chemin d’Estradère	1863	Raymond	62		A path that went from Asson to Arthez-d’Asson over the mountain
La Fourcade	La Fourcade	1863	Raymond	65		Farm
Grabot	Martinet de Grabaud	1771	Raymond	73	Intendance	Ironworks
Hermitage	Lo Castet d'Assoo	1538	Raymond	77	Reformation	Ancient mound. Isaac Vergès of Nay built a monastery (Hermitage) on the mound in the 17th century
	la Bielle d'Asson	1675	Raymond	77	Reformation	
Lalanne	Lalanne	1863	Raymond	91		Hamlet
Larban	Larban	1540	Raymond	93	Reformation	Farm
Minvielle	la maison noble de Mainvielle	1673	Raymond	113	Reformation	Fief of Asson, Vassal of the Viscounts of Béarn
Palu	Paluu	1385	Raymond	131	Census	Farm
	Palu	1863	Raymond	131		
Les Pandelles	las Pandeles	1443	Raymond	131	Cour Majour	Farm
	Les Pandelles	1863	Raymond	131		
Subercaze	la maison noble de Subercase	1684	Raymond	164	Reformation	Fief subject to the Viscounts of Béarn
	Les Pandelles	1863	Raymond	164		

Sources

- Raymond: Topographic Dictionary of the Department of Basses-Pyrénées, 1863, on the page numbers indicated in the table. (in French)
- Grosclaude: Toponymic Dictionary of communes, Béarn, 2006 (in French)
- Saint-Pé: Cartulary of the Abbey of Saint-Pé
- Reformation: Reformation of Béarn
- Lescar: Cartulary of Lescar
- Census: Census of Béarn
- Fors de Béarn
- Intendance: Intendance of Pau
- Cour Majour: Regulations of the Cour Majour
- Notaries of Nay
- Cassini: Cassini Map from 1750

== History ==
Paul Raymond noted on p. 14 that before 1232 Asson was localised near the place called the Hermitage and that there was a Lay Abbey, vassal of the Viscounts of Béarn.

The village signed a Charter of Emancipation on 4 January 1282 with the consent of Gaston VII, Viscount of Béarn.

In 1385, Asson had 57 fires and depended on the bailiwick of Nay.

Asson came under the Notary of Nay as did Angaïs, Arros, Arthez-d'Asson, Baliros, Baudreix, Bénéjacq, Beuste, Boeil, Bordères, Bosdarros, Clarac, Coarraze, Igon, Lagos, Lestelle, Mirepeix, Montaut, Nay, Pardies, and Saint-Abit.

== Administration ==
List of Successive Mayors

From	To	Name	Party	Position
1947	1989	Jean Labarrère		General Councillor
1989	2008	Laurent Aubuchou-Aurioux	UMP	
2008	2014	Patrick Moura		
2014	2026	Marc Canton	UDI	

=== Inter-communality ===
The commune is part of five inter-communal structures:

- the Communauté de communes du Pays de Nay;
- the association for water and sanitation of Pays de Nay;
- the Energy association of Pyrénées-Atlantiques;
- the inter-communal association of Gave de Pau;
- the joint association for the basin of the Gave de Pau;

== Demography ==
The inhabitants of the commune are known as Assonais in French.

Historical population

Year	Pop.	±% p.a.
1793	2,487	—
1800	2,179	−1.87%
1806	2,318	+1.04%
1821	2,527	+0.58%
1831	2,582	+0.22%
1836	2,564	−0.14%
1841	2,515	−0.39%
1846	2,599	+0.66%
1851	2,594	−0.04%
1856	2,661	+0.51%
1861	2,626	−0.26%
1866	2,600	−0.20%
1872	2,406	−1.28%
1876	2,550	+1.46%
1881	2,541	−0.07%
1886	2,554	+0.10%
1891	2,406	−1.19%
1896	2,521	+0.94%
1901	2,518	−0.02%

Year	Pop.	±% p.a.
1906	2,534	+0.13%
1911	2,416	−0.95%
1921	1,862	−2.57%
1926	1,843	−0.20%
1931	1,854	+0.12%
1936	1,744	−1.22%
1946	1,519	−1.37%
1954	1,508	−0.09%
1962	1,506	−0.02%
1968	1,527	+0.23%
1975	1,676	+1.34%
1982	1,644	−0.28%
1990	1,652	+0.06%
1999	1,771	+0.78%
2007	1,875	+0.72%
2012	2,042	+1.72%
2017	2,031	−0.11%
2023	1,982	−0.41%

Source: EHESS and INSEE

== Economy ==
The commune is part of the Appellation d'origine contrôlée (AOC) zone of Ossau-iraty and has protected geographical indications (PGI) namely: Tarbais haricots, Tomme des Pyrénées, Duck foie gras of the South-west, and Bayonne ham.

== Culture and heritage ==
The local language is occitan-gascon, called locally béarnais. A bilingual class offers courses in béarnais in the commune school from kindergarten to CM2.

=== Civil heritage ===
There is a Metallic Glasshouse at Lalanne in the Asson zoo built in 1900.

The owners of the Château of Abère have been known since the 12th century.

=== Religious heritage ===
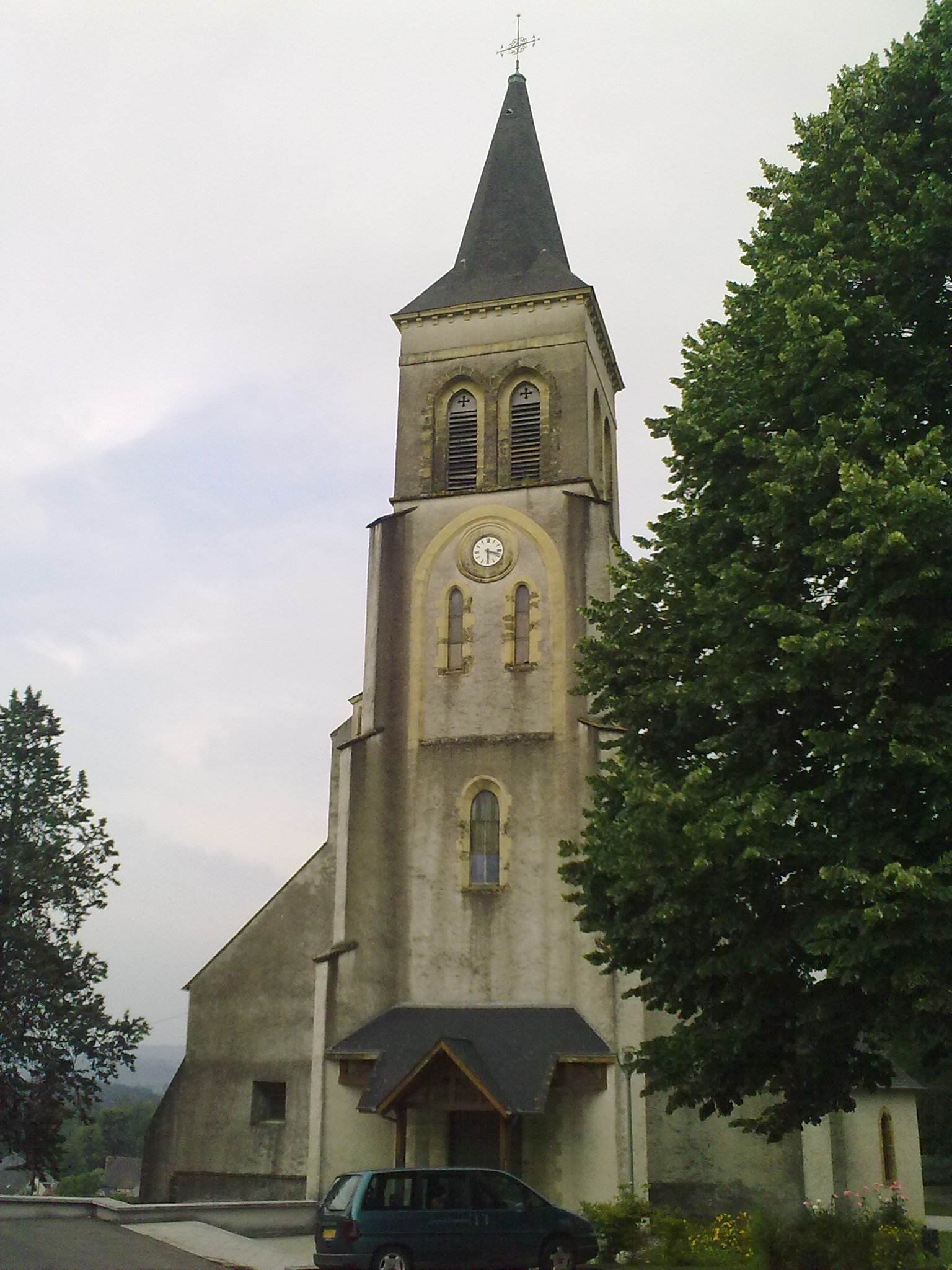
The Church of Saint Martin

The Church of Saint-Martin, partially dating from the 15th century, contains a Triptych of the Crucifixion from the 16th century.

Asson is a stage on the Chemin du piémont pyrénéen (or el cami deu pé de la coste), a secondary itinerary on the Way of St. James.

=== Environmental heritage ===
The Bétharram Caves
The Grottes de Bétharram (Bétharram Caves) are a series of Caves located on the border between the departments of Pyrénées-Atlantiques and Hautes-Pyrénées.
Their extent cover some of the communes of Asson and Lestelle-Bétharram in Pyrénées-Atlantiques and Saint-Pé-de-Bigorre in Hautes-Pyrénées. They can be explored on foot, by boat, or by a small train.

Asson Zoo
Covering five hectares, Asson zoo displays a zoological collection composed of endangered or unusual species in zoos.

Mountains

The following mountain peaks are found in the commune:

- The Castet-Ousset (718 metres)
- The Soum de Camlong (881 metres)
- The Céberi (891 metres)
- The Soum d’Arangou (892 metres)
- The Soum de la Bécole (947 metres)
- The Pène de la Hèche (1,326 metres)
- The Toupiettes (1,357 metres)
- The Soum de Martî-Peyras (1,464 metres)
- The Soume de Moulle (1,544 metres)
- The Peak of Monbula (1,583 metres)

== Facilities ==
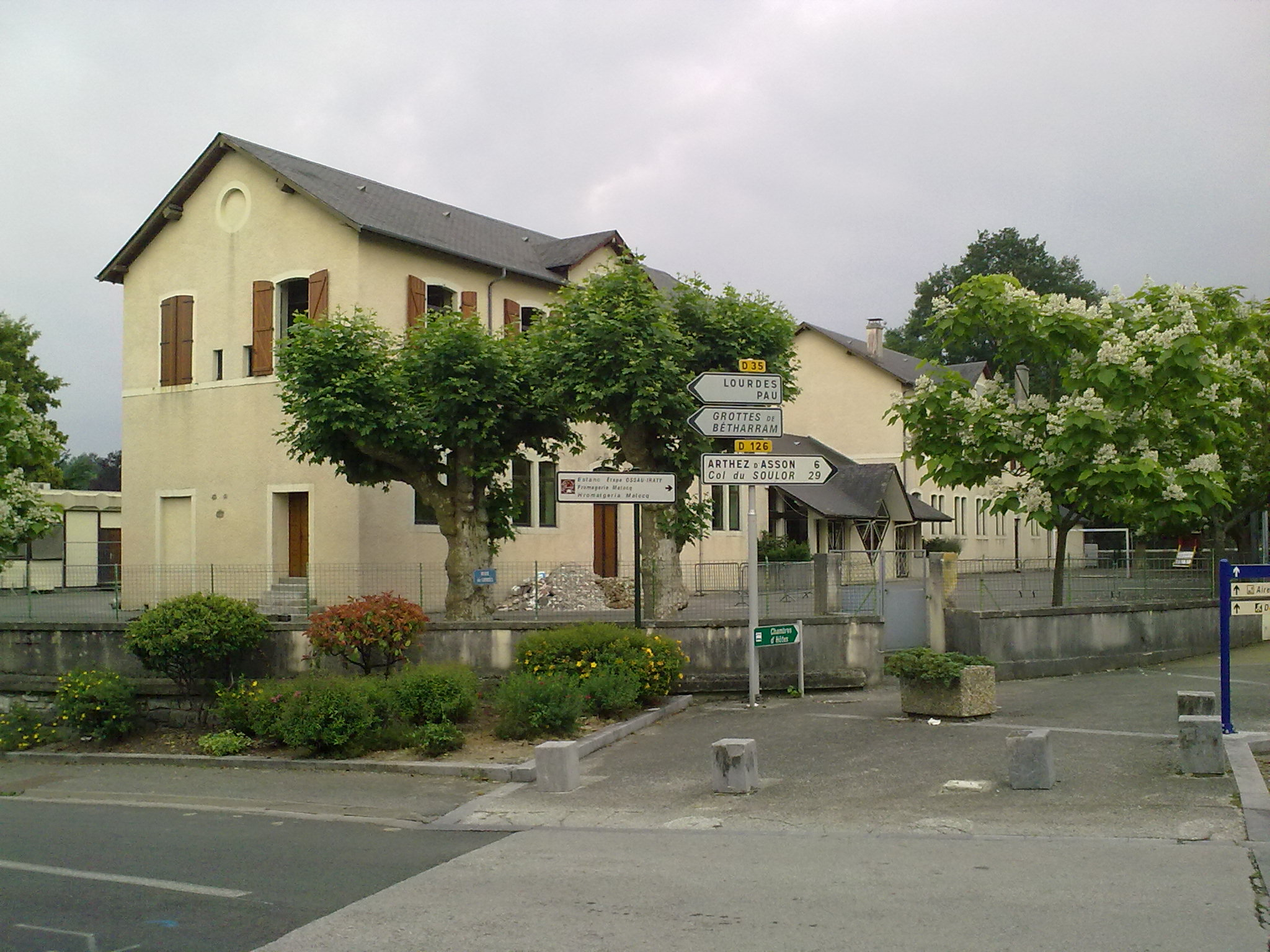
Asson School

=== Éducation ===
Asson has two primary schools (The école du Bourg and the école du Pont Latapie).

=== Sport ===
Sports in Asson revolve around the Ladies Handball Championship of France, National 3.

== See also ==
- Communes of the Pyrénées-Atlantiques department

=== External links ===
- Asson commune website
- Asson on Géoportail, National Geographic Institute (IGN) website (in French)
- Aßon on the 1750 Cassini Map
