= Arros-de-Nay =

- Commune
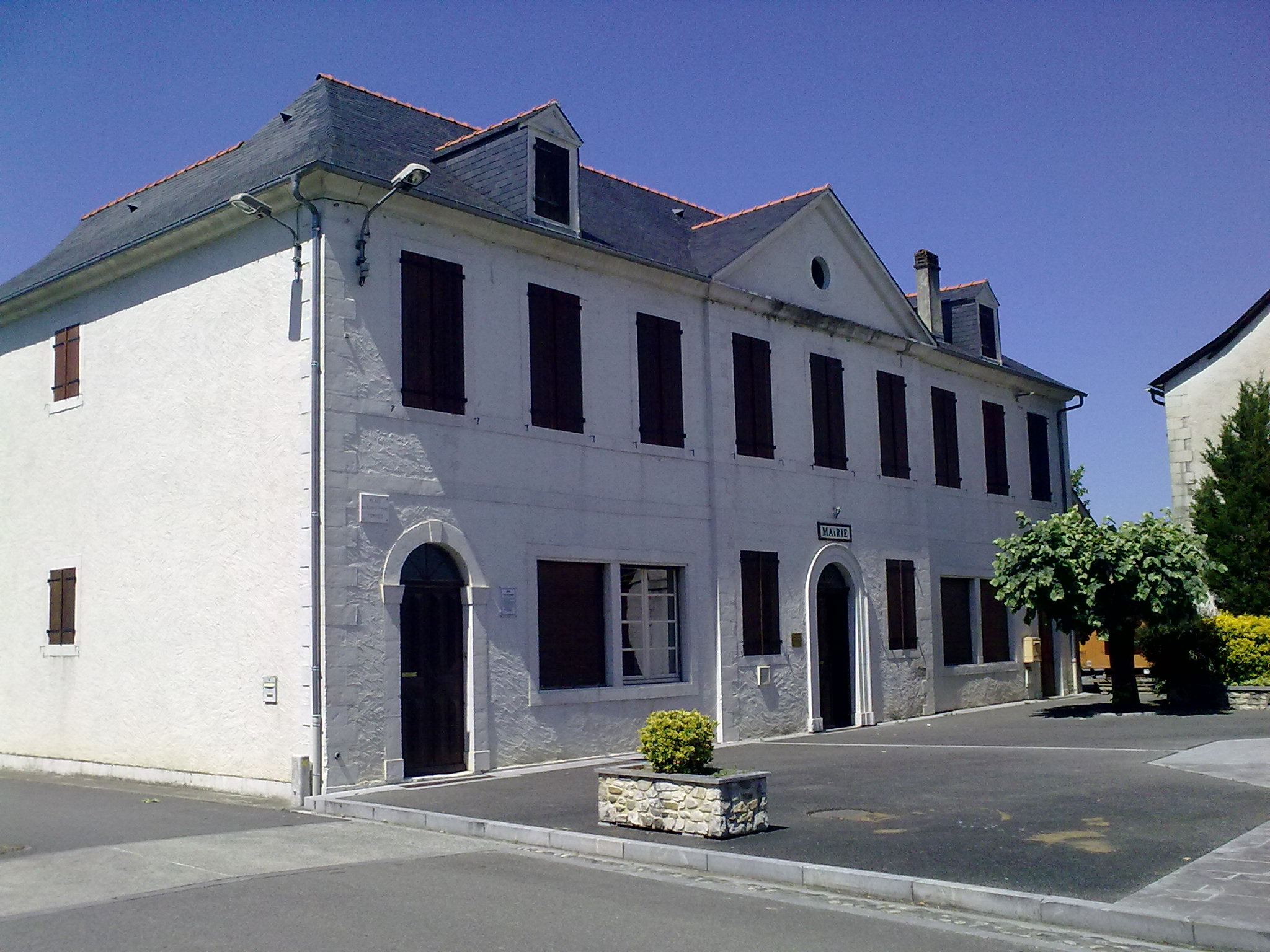
- Town hall

- Coat of arms
- Location of Arros-de-Nay
- Location within France Location within Nouvelle-Aquitaine
- Coordinates: 43°12′01″N 0°17′09″W
- Country: France
- Region: Nouvelle-Aquitaine
- Department: Pyrénées-Atlantiques
- Arrondissement: Pau
- Canton: Ouzom, Gave et Rives du Neez
- Intercommunality: CC Pays Nay

Government
  - Mayor (2020–2026): Gérard d'Arros
- Area^{1}: 13.47 km^{2} (5.20 sq mi)
- Elevation: 236 m (774 ft)
- Highest elevation: 421 m (1,381 ft)
- Lowest elevation: 230 m (750 ft)
- Population (2023): 820
  - Density: 61/km^{2} (160/sq mi)
- Time zone: UTC+01:00 (CET)
  - Summer (DST): UTC+02:00 (CEST)
- INSEE/Postal code: 64054 /64800
- ^{1} French Land Register data, which excludes lakes, ponds, glaciers > 1 km^{2} (0.386 sq mi or 247 acres) and river estuaries.

Arros-de-Nay (French pronunciation: [aʁɔs də naj]; Occitan: Arròs de Nai) is a commune in the Pyrénées-Atlantiques department in the Nouvelle-Aquitaine region of south-western France.

== Geography ==
Arros-de-Nay is part of the urban area of Pau located in the heart of a valley between wooded hills and the Gave de Pau some 13 km south-east of Pau immediately east of Nay. The commune has been administered by the department of Pyrénées-Atlantiques since 1969 (formerly it had been in the Department of Basses-Pyrénées since 1793). The commune has about 300 houses. The altitude varies from 230 metres to 421 metres, with 243 metres in the village centre. This is one of the largest communal areas of the region with areas of plains and hilly areas with a livable areas in the north and in the hamlets.

Access to the commune is by road D37 from Saint-Abit in the north passing through the village and the northern corner of the commune continuing to Bourdettes in the south. The D936 goes west from the village then south-west to Rébénacq. The D288 road goes south from the village through the length of the commune to join the D287 north of Lys. The D388 branches from the D288 and goes south-west by a different route to join the D288 again south-west of the commune. The D287 goes south-west from Nay passing along the south-eastern border of the commune and continuing south-west to Sévignacq-Meyracq.

The commune is located in the Drainage basin of the Adour with the Luz flowing from the south through the length of the commune collecting many tributaries and continuing north to join the Gave de Pau near Narcastet. The Escourre flows north through the northern corner of the commune and the north-eastern tip of the commune touches the Gave de Pau.

=== Places and Hamlets ===
- Allemand (hill)
- Bacabara
- Barbé
- Barrère
- Barthe
- Bées
- Bégué
- La Bernadie
- Bois de Bié (forest)
- Blanquet
- Blon
- Bouhabent
- Bourda-Plà
- Bouria
- Bozom
- Brouquet
- Brousset
- Cabarry
- Casamayou
- Casenave
- Castéra
- Cataline
- La Châtaigneraie (two places)
- Grange Clédou
- Couchies
- Coumet
- Daguès-Bié
- Gahuset
- Guillamasse
- Habarna
- Habe
- Haure
- Hourcade
- Jupé
- Labasserres
- Labourie
- Lacrouts
- Ladebat
- Lambrou
- Lanot
- Lasbordes
- Bois de Lauga (forest)
- Lème Carraze
- Lème Monlucou
- Lolou
- Grange Lolou
- Lombré
- Massaly (ruins)
- Michelat
- Grange Miramon
- Moncaut (spring)
- Mondaut
- Grange Monsempès
- Moun du Rey
- Mourtérou
- Nérios
- Ourthe
- L'Oustau
- Paloc
- Petit Paloc
- Pareil
- Pédemelou
- Le Petit Hameau
- Picourlat
- Plà
- Le Point de Vue
- Porteteny
- Rieupeyrous
- Thomas
- Toulet
- Tourne (ruins)

== Toponymy ==
The commune name in béarnais is Arros de Nai.

Michel Grosclaude, with much reservation, suggested an Aquitaine root of (h)arr ("stone" or "rock") with the suffix -ossum, which gives a meaning "where there are rocks".

The following table details the origins of the commune name and other names in the commune.

Name	Spelling	Date	Source	Page	Origin	Description
Arros	Arrossium	1100	Raymond	13	Titles of Mifaget	Village
	Arros	1120	Grosclaude			
	Arrode	12th century	Raymond	13	Marca	
	Rode	12th century	Raymond	13	Marca	
	Arros	1286	Pau			
	Arros	1750	Cassini			
Bées	le Bée	1675	Raymond	26	Reformation	Stream rising at Capbis and joining the Gave de Pau after flowing through Asson, and Arros-de-Nay.
	Le Béès	1863	Raymond	26		
Bié	Bier	1385	Raymond	31	Census	Farm
Bozom	La Monyoge de Bosom	1536	Raymond	36	Reformation	Farm
	Bouzoum	1863	Raymond	36		
Château d'Espalungue	Espalungue	1863	Raymond	61		Chateau
Laragnous	Laranhoet	1385	Raymond	93	Census	Farm

Sources:

- Raymond: Topographic Dictionary of the Department of Basses-Pyrenees, 1863, on the page numbers indicated in the table. (in French)
- Grosclaude: Toponymic Dictionary of communes, Béarn, 2006 (in French)
- Pau: Cartulary of the Château of Pau
- Cassini: Cassini Map from 1750

Origins:

- Marca: Pierre de Marca, History of Béarn.
- Reformation: Reformation of Béarn
- Census: Census of Béarn

On 27 January 1932 the prefect, citing consecutive administrative mistakes from the plurality of the name Arros in the department (Arros Canton of Nay, Arros Canton of Oloron), decided to associate the name of the chief town of the canton with that of the commune and asked the Municipal Council to endorse his decision. The council of the time complied and the name became Arros-de-Nay.

== History ==
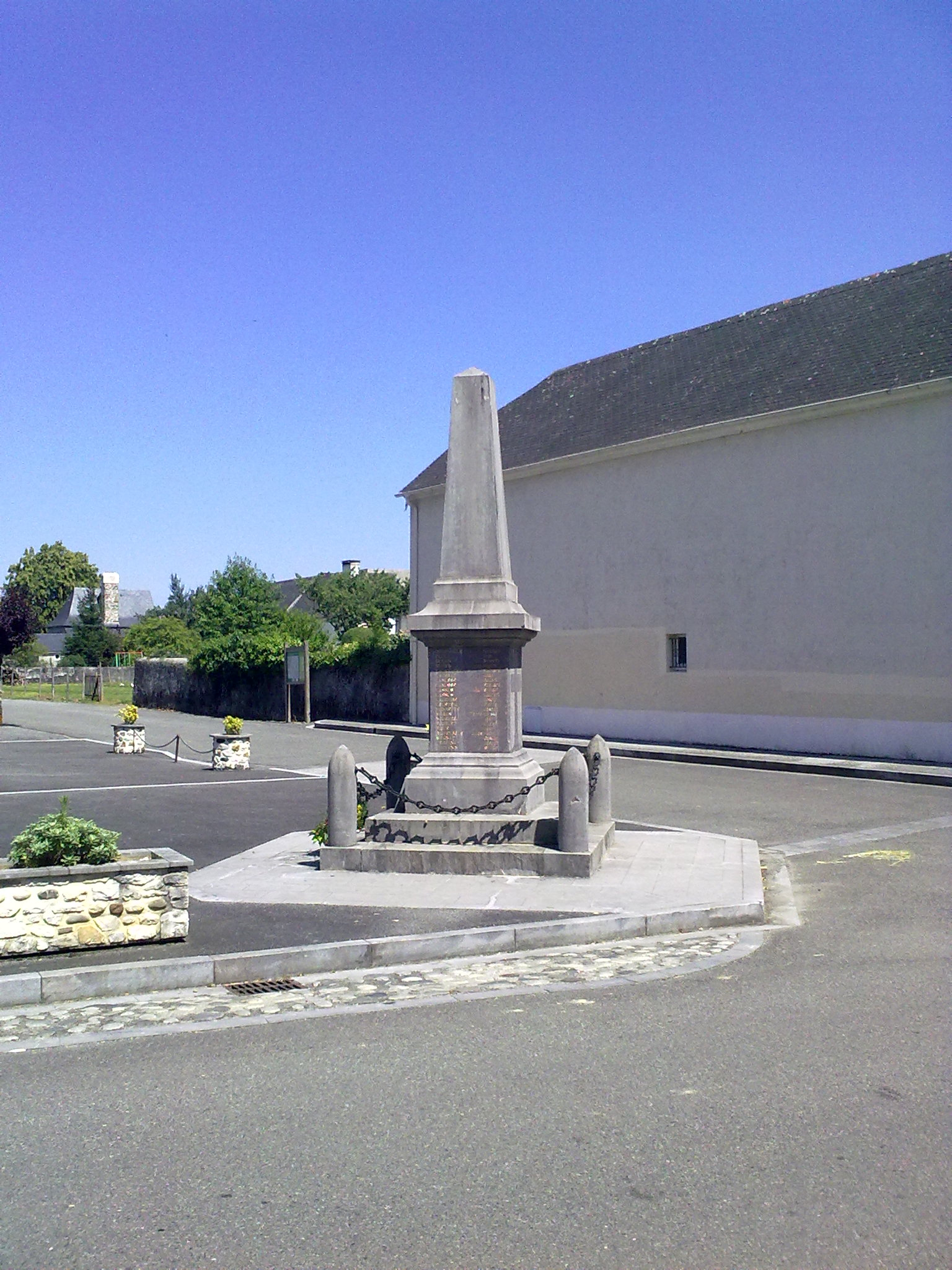
The War Memorial.

The first traces of the village date to the 11th century when it was cited with the name Arrossium ("place where there are rocks"). In the 12th century a noble family (de Rode, d'Arrode, then d'Arros) who owned the Lordships of Rode, Vauzé, the Viguerie of Lembeye took possession of the fief which became Arrode then later Arros.

Paul Raymond noted that, in 1385, Arros had 44 fires and depended on the bailiwick of Pau. Arros, with its hamlets towards Bosdarros ('Bois d'Arros'), was the seventh largest of the twelve large Baronies of Béarn.

=== Heraldry ===
Arms of Arros-de-Nay	Each lozenge represents one of the five districts: the village (where the chateau is), Moun de Rey, Bois de Bié, Les Labassères, le Petit Hameau. Blazon: Or, five lozenges of Sable set 3 and 2.

== Administration ==
List of Successive Mayors

Mayors from the French Revolution to 1923

From	To	Name
1793	1796	Jean Laban
1796	1799	Jean Lassus
1799	1802	Jean Grilhere
1802	1805	Joseph Miramon
1805	1809	Jean-Baptiste d'Espalungue
1835		Miramon
1867	1871	Miramon
1871	1882	Suberbielle
1882	1887	Henri d'Espalungue
1887	1888	Alexis Barrère
1888	1896	Marcel Miramon
1896	1900	Armand d'Espalungue
1900	1904	Jean-Alexis Dufau
1904	1912	Armand d'Espalungue
1912	1919	Jean Dufau
1919	1923	Édouard Meniche

Mayors from 1961

From	To	Name
1961	1977	Léon Fiol
1977	1983	Jean Buisson
1983	1995	Jean Berrette
1995	2001	André Broqué
2001	2014	Georges Bordenave
2014	2026	Gérard d'Arros

=== Inter-communality ===
The commune is part of seven inter-communal structures:

- the Communauté de communes du Pays de Nay;
- the AEP association of Nay-Ouest;
- the Sanitation association of Pays du Nay;
- the Energy association of Pyrénées-Atlantiques;
- the inter-communal association for the defence against floods of the Gave de Pau;
- the inter-communal association for the defence against floods of the Luz;
- the inter-communal association for the construction of the CES of Nay;

== Demography ==
The inhabitants of the commune are known as Arrosiens or Arrosiennes in French.

Historical population

Year	Pop.	±% p.a.
1793	1,069	—
1800	842	−3.35%
1806	1,017	+3.20%
1821	1,158	+0.87%
1831	1,100	−0.51%
1836	1,170	+1.24%
1841	1,164	−0.10%
1846	1,110	−0.95%
1851	1,121	+0.20%
1856	1,124	+0.05%
1861	1,164	+0.70%
1866	1,104	−1.05%
1872	1,007	−1.52%
1876	965	−1.06%
1881	986	+0.43%
1886	928	−1.21%
1891	903	−0.54%
1896	932	+0.63%
1901	907	−0.54%

Year	Pop.	±% p.a.
1906	911	+0.09%
1911	837	−1.68%
1921	751	−1.08%
1926	725	−0.70%
1931	764	+1.05%
1936	712	−1.40%
1946	629	−1.23%
1954	643	+0.28%
1962	605	−0.76%
1968	582	−0.64%
1975	681	+2.27%
1982	816	+2.62%
1990	817	+0.02%
1999	728	−1.27%
2007	731	+0.05%
2012	829	+2.55%
2017	783	−1.14%
2023	820	+0.77%

Source: EHESS and INSEE

== Economy ==
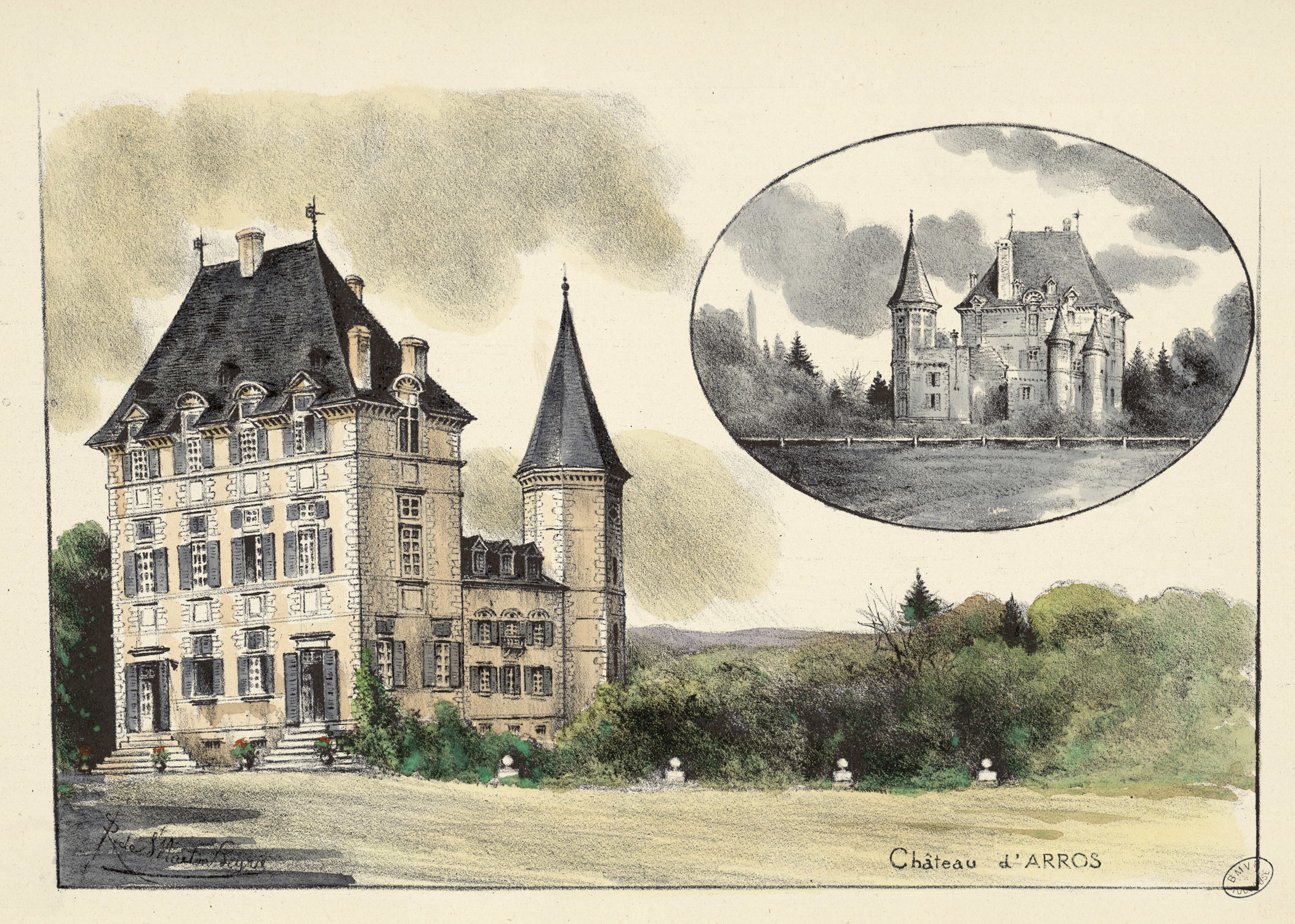
The Chateau of Arros in 1926

The commune is part of the Appellation d'origine contrôlée (AOC) zone designation of Ossau-iraty.

== Culture and Heritage ==
=== Civil heritage ===
The Chateau of Arros (17th century) is registered as an historical monument.

=== Religious heritage ===
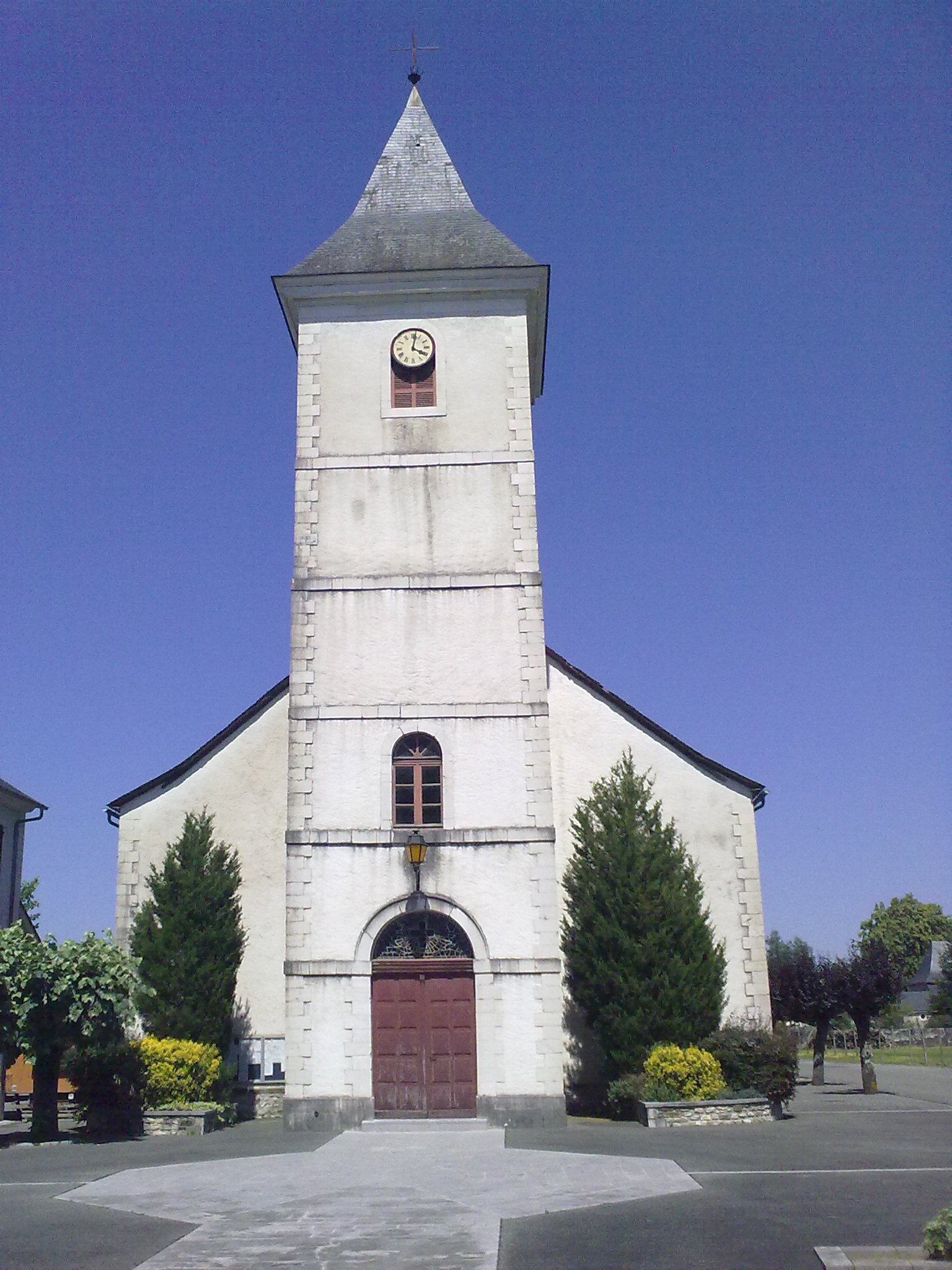
The church of Saint-Jacques-le-Majeur.

- The Parish Church of Saint-Jacques-le-Majeur (1835) is registered as an historical monument.

== Education ==
Arros-de-Nay has a primary school.

== See also ==
- Communes of the Pyrénées-Atlantiques department
