= Baliros =

- Commune
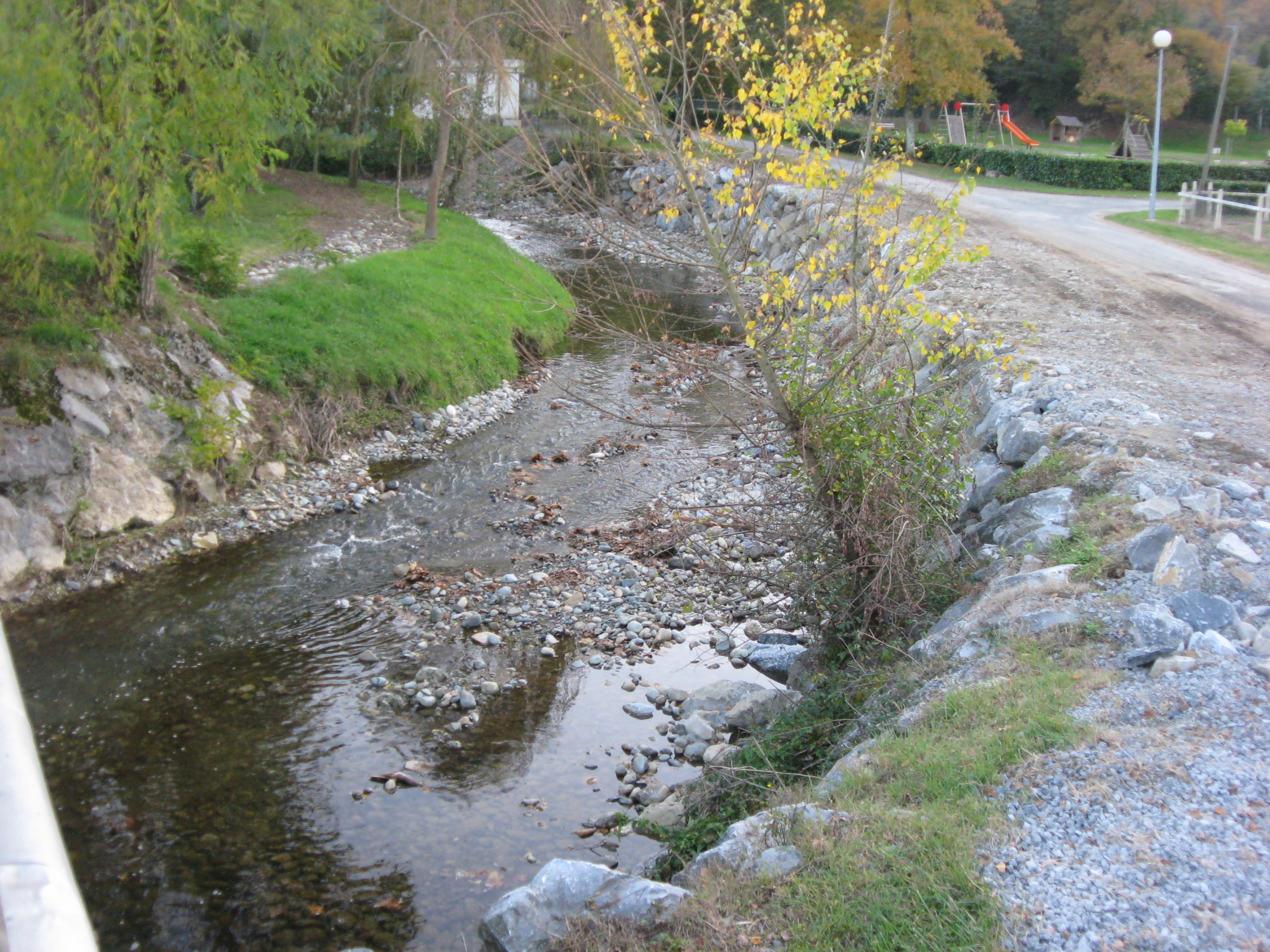
- The Luz at Baliros

- Coat of arms
- Location of Baliros
- Location within France Location within Nouvelle-Aquitaine
- Coordinates: 43°13′43″N 0°18′18″W
- Country: France
- Region: Nouvelle-Aquitaine
- Department: Pyrénées-Atlantiques
- Arrondissement: Pau
- Canton: Ouzom, Gave et Rives du Neez
- Intercommunality: Pays de Nay

Government
  - Mayor (2020–2026): Sylvie Daugas
- Area^{1}: 3.64 km^{2} (1.41 sq mi)
- Elevation: 215 m (705 ft)
- Highest elevation: 382 m (1,253 ft)
- Lowest elevation: 200 m (660 ft)
- Population (2023): 515
  - Density: 141/km^{2} (366/sq mi)
- Time zone: UTC+01:00 (CET)
  - Summer (DST): UTC+02:00 (CEST)
- INSEE/Postal code: 64091 /64510
- ^{1} French Land Register data, which excludes lakes, ponds, glaciers > 1 km^{2} (0.386 sq mi or 247 acres) and river estuaries.

Baliros (French pronunciation: [baliʁɔs]; Occitan: Valiròs) is a commune in the Pyrénées-Atlantiques department in the Nouvelle-Aquitaine region of south-western France.

== Geography ==
Baliros is located some 12 km south-east of Pau just west of Bordes. Access to the commune is by the D37 road from Narcastet in the north which passes through the centre of the commune and the village before continuing south to Pardies-Piétat. The village is served by bus routes 809, 810, and 811 of the Interurban Network of Pyrenees-Atlantiques which connect Pau with Arthez-d'Asson. The commune is forested west of the village with the eastern side farmland.

The Gave de Pau flows north along the eastern border of the commune although it is not the communal border. The Luz river flows from the south-west of the commune north through the village to join the Gave de Pau at the northern border of the commune. The Gest joins the Luz in the south of the commune. The Escourre flows north from the south-eastern corner of the commune to join the Luz north of the village.

=== Places and hamlets ===
- L'Arroundade de la Plaine
- Cazaous
- Claverie
- Colomby (château)
- L'Engoust
- Hillou (part)
- Hourcade
- Monregard

== Toponymy ==
Michel Grosclaude proposed the Latin etymology of the surname Valerus with the Aquitaine suffix -ossum giving "Domain of Valerus".

The following table details the origins of the commune name.

| Name | Spelling | Date | Source | Page | Origin | Description |
|---|---|---|---|---|---|---|
| Baliros | Baliros | 1385 | Grosclaude | | Census | Village |
| | Balliros | 1515 | Raymond | 20 | Assat | |
| | Baliroos | 1538 | Raymond | 20 | Reformation | |
| | Baliros | 1750 | Cassini | | | |

Sources:

- Grosclaude: Toponymic Dictionary of communes, Béarn, 2006 (in French)
- Raymond: Topographic Dictionary of the Department of Basses-Pyrenees, 1863, on the page numbers indicated in the table. (in French)
- Cassini: Cassini Map from 1750

Origins:

- Census: Census of Béarn
- Assat: Titles of Assat
- Reformation: Reformation of Béarn

== History ==
Paul Raymond noted on page 20 of his 1863 dictionary that in 1385 Baliros had 11 fires and depended on the bailiwick of Pau.

=== Heraldry ===
| Arms of Baliros | The official status of the blazon remains to be determined. Blazon: Quarterly: at 1 Azure, a paschal lamb rear regardant bearing a standard charged with a cross couped all of Argent; at 2 Argent, three sticks of Sable in pale; at 3 Or, three escallops of Gules set 2 and 1; at 4 Argent, three bends Azure. |

== Administration ==
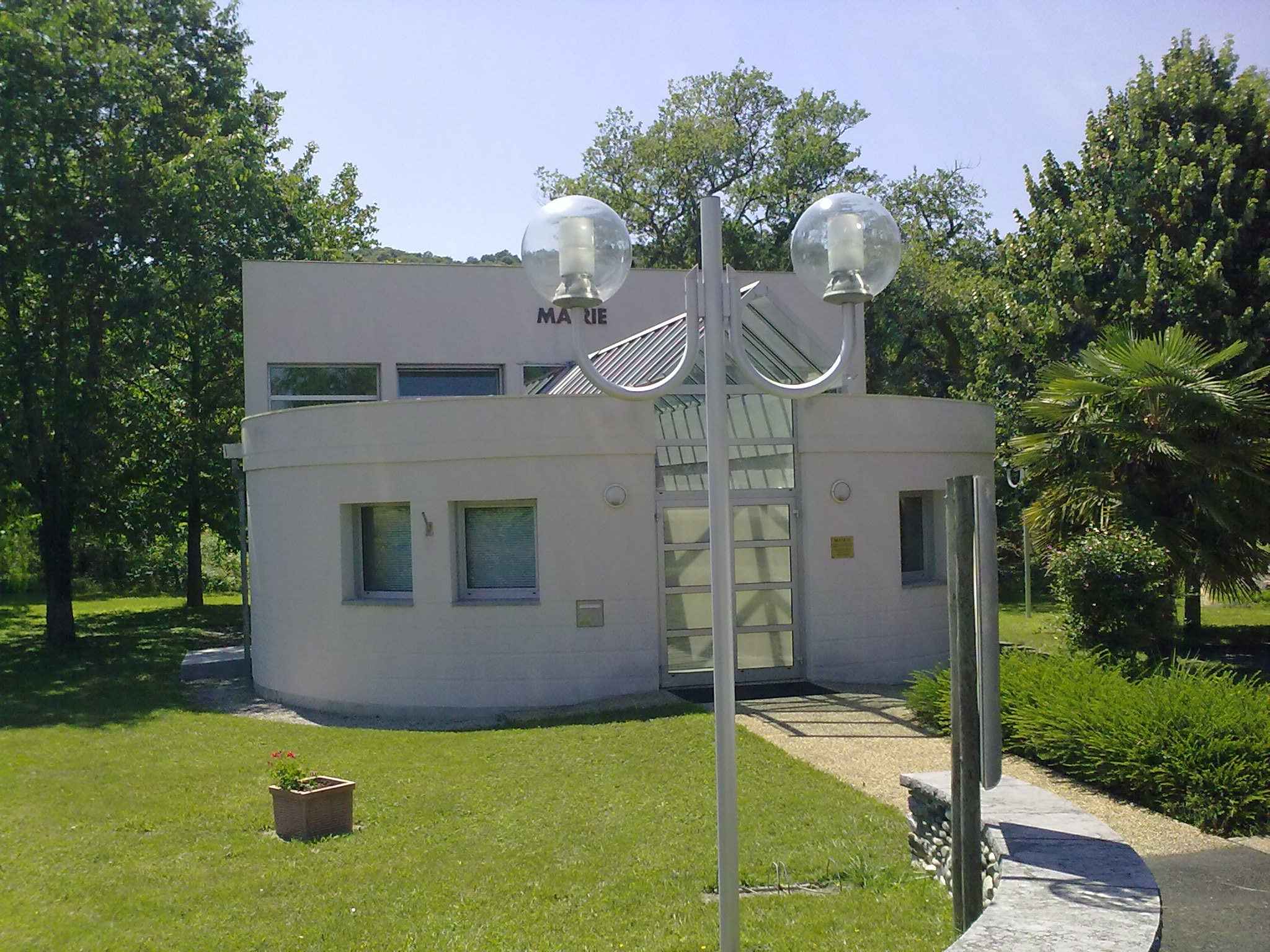
Baliros Town Hall

List of Successive Mayors

| From | To | Name |
|---|---|---|
| 1995 | 2008 | Jean-Claude Duprat |
| 2008 | 2014 | Jacques Robert |
| 2014 | 2020 | Jean-Claude Hourcq |
| 2020 | 2026 | Sylvie Daugas |

=== Inter-communality ===
The commune is part of six inter-communal structures:

- the Communauté de communes du Pays de Nay;
- the SIVU of RPI Baliros - Pardies-Piétat - Saint-Abit (headquarters in Baliros);
- the drinking water and sanitation association of Pays de Nay (SEAPAN);
- the Energy association of Pyrénées-Atlantiques;
- the inter-communal association for defence against floods of the Gave de Pau;
- the inter-communal association for defence against floods of the Luz;

== Demography ==
The inhabitants of the commune are known as Balirosiens or Balirosiennes in French.

Historical population

| Year | Pop. | ±% p.a. |
|---|---|---|
| 1793 | 120 | — |
| 1821 | 290 | +3.20% |
| 1846 | 326 | +0.47% |
| 1872 | 320 | −0.07% |
| 1901 | 274 | −0.53% |
| 1926 | 197 | −1.31% |
| 1946 | 164 | −0.91% |
| 1962 | 194 | +1.06% |
| 1968 | 268 | +5.53% |

| Year | Pop. | ±% p.a. |
|---|---|---|
| 1975 | 342 | +3.54% |
| 1982 | 335 | −0.29% |
| 1990 | 365 | +1.08% |
| 1999 | 377 | +0.36% |
| 2007 | 374 | −0.10% |
| 2012 | 386 | +0.63% |
| 2017 | 475 | +4.24% |
| 2023 | 515 | +1.36% |

Source: EHESS and INSEE

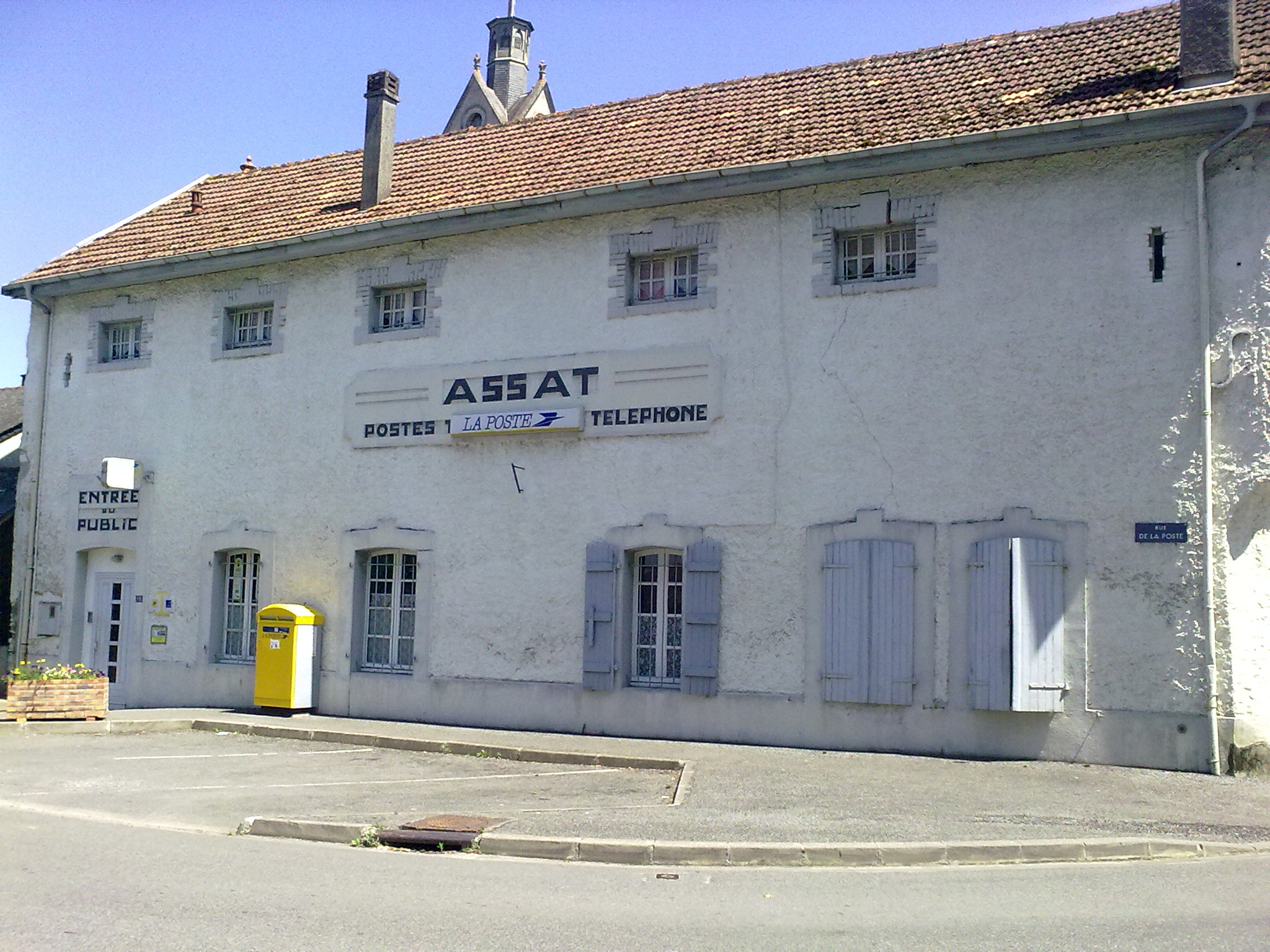
Baliros Post Office

== Economy ==
The commune is part of the Appellation d'origine contrôlée (AOC) zone of Ossau-iraty.

== Sites and monuments ==
The Parish Church of Saint Peter (1658) is registered as an historical monument.

== Facilities ==
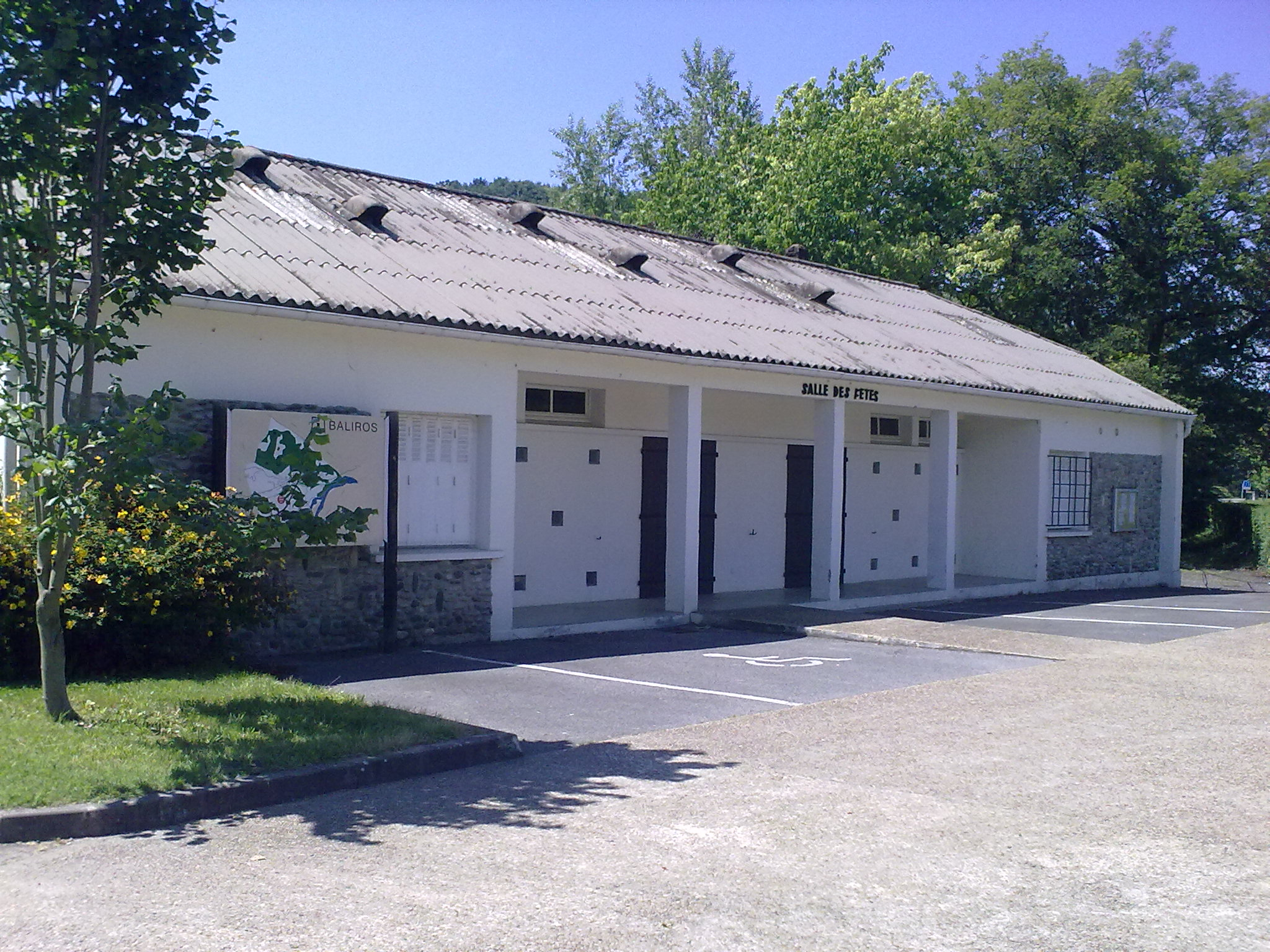
The Baliros Community Hall.

Baliros is a member of the Inter-communal Educational Grouping (RPI) of Baliros - Pardies-Piétat - Saint-Abit which runs the Baliros and Pardies-Piétat primary schools.

== See also ==
- Communes of the Pyrénées-Atlantiques department
