= Nay, Pyrénées-Atlantiques =

Nay Nai
- Commune
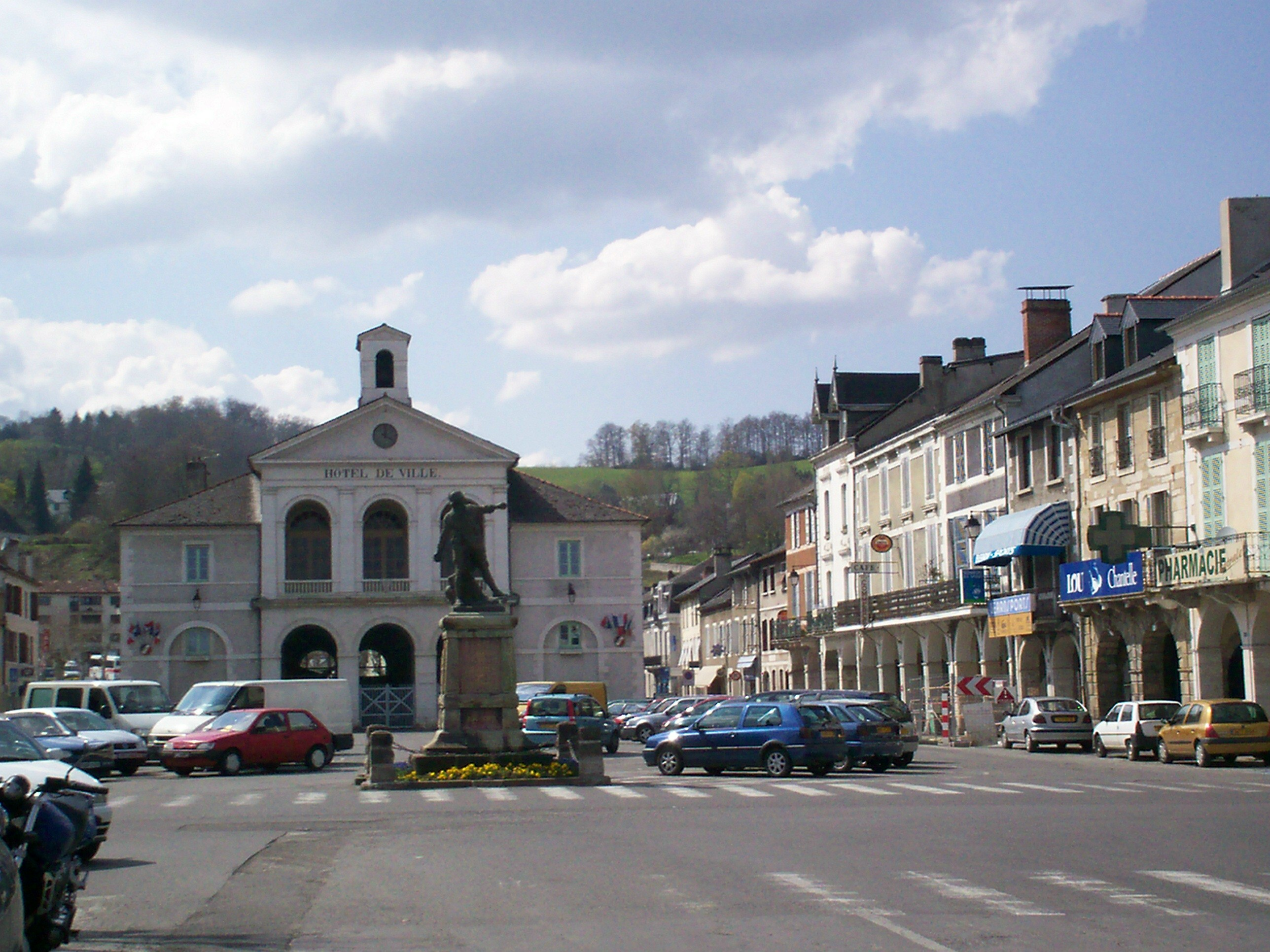
- Town hall

- Coat of arms
- Location of Nay
- Location within France Location within Nouvelle-Aquitaine
- Coordinates: 43°10′52″N 0°15′40″W
- Country: France
- Region: Nouvelle-Aquitaine
- Department: Pyrénées-Atlantiques
- Arrondissement: Pau
- Canton: Ouzom, Gave et Rives du Neez
- Intercommunality: Pays de Nay

Government
  - Mayor (2020–2026): Bruno Bourdaa
- Area^{1}: 5.27 km^{2} (2.03 sq mi)
- Elevation: 352 m (1,155 ft)
- Highest elevation: 402 m (1,319 ft)
- Lowest elevation: 244 m (801 ft)
- Population (2023): 3,184
  - Density: 604/km^{2} (1,560/sq mi)
- Time zone: UTC+01:00 (CET)
  - Summer (DST): UTC+02:00 (CEST)
- INSEE/Postal code: 64417 /64800
- ^{1} French Land Register data, which excludes lakes, ponds, glaciers > 1 km^{2} (0.386 sq mi or 247 acres) and river estuaries.

Nay (French pronunciation: [naj]; Occitan: Nai; from the Latin: oppidum nayum) is a commune in the Pyrénées-Atlantiques department in south-western France. It lies in the former province of Béarn.

== Geography ==
The land of the commune are crossed by the Gave de Pau and one of its tributaries, the Béez.

=== Place names ===
Claracq, on the other side of the Gave de Pau, was once a separate town. Today, it is a district of Nay, along the canal.

=== Neighboring communes ===
- Bourdettes and Mirepeix, to the north
- Arros-de-Nay, to the west
- Asson, to the south
- Igon and Coarraze, to the east

== History ==
The fortified town (Bastide) was founded in 1302, by Marguerite de Moncada, Viscountess of Béarn, after she had purchased the land from the Hôpital Sainte-Christine de Gabas. Nay had much to suffer throughout its history; the town was destroyed in 1534 by a fire, of unknown origin, which entirely consumed the city. Shortly thereafter, the religious wars followed, and in 1569, the papists plundered the town, and the Huguenots returned with vigor. Among Protestants who emigrated, Mr. Olivier, an ancestor of British actor Sir Laurence Olivier. The town was famous for other children, including De Solano, born in 1772, who became Governor of the Manila Islands. Thereafter, Nay became a very industrial city, specializing in spinning, which flourished in this area so much so, that it became nicknamed "Little Manchester".

== Heraldry ==
| The Coat of Arms of Nay are blazoned as follows: Azure field, two gold rams facing underneath three silver crosses, the chief gules charged with three gold stars. |

== City administration ==
In 1973, Nay and the nearby commune of Bourdettes merged into a single commune. They remained merged until 1 January 1997.

In 2006, the communal government had thirty-two officers and employees; this was fewer than it had been in 2001.

Mayors of Nay
| Election date | Name |
|---|---|
Data before 1995 is not currently available.
| 1995 | Maurice Triep-Capdeville |
| 2001 | Robert Malterre |
| 2008 | Guy Chabrout |

== Demographics ==
Historical population

| Year | Pop. | ±% p.a. |
|---|---|---|
| 1793 | 2,262 | — |
| 1800 | 2,376 | +0.70% |
| 1806 | 2,600 | +1.51% |
| 1821 | 3,011 | +0.98% |
| 1831 | 3,290 | +0.89% |
| 1836 | 3,416 | +0.75% |
| 1841 | 3,227 | −1.13% |
| 1846 | 3,236 | +0.06% |
| 1851 | 3,278 | +0.26% |
| 1856 | 3,082 | −1.23% |
| 1861 | 3,458 | +2.33% |
| 1866 | 3,409 | −0.29% |
| 1872 | 3,127 | −1.43% |
| 1876 | 3,233 | +0.84% |
| 1881 | 3,272 | +0.24% |
| 1886 | 3,440 | +1.01% |
| 1891 | 3,536 | +0.55% |
| 1896 | 3,636 | +0.56% |
| 1901 | 3,670 | +0.19% |

| Year | Pop. | ±% p.a. |
|---|---|---|
| 1906 | 3,806 | +0.73% |
| 1911 | 3,950 | +0.75% |
| 1921 | 3,360 | −1.60% |
| 1926 | 3,521 | +0.94% |
| 1931 | 3,248 | −1.60% |
| 1936 | 3,200 | −0.30% |
| 1946 | 3,116 | −0.27% |
| 1954 | 3,457 | +1.31% |
| 1962 | 3,444 | −0.05% |
| 1968 | 3,440 | −0.02% |
| 1975 | 3,375 | −0.27% |
| 1982 | 3,462 | +0.36% |
| 1990 | 3,591 | +0.46% |
| 1999 | 3,204 | −1.26% |
| 2007 | 3,321 | +0.45% |
| 2012 | 3,209 | −0.68% |
| 2017 | 3,288 | +0.49% |
| 2023 | 3,184 | −0.53% |

Source: EHESS and INSEE (1968-2023)

== Religious heritage ==
The Église Saint-Vincent (15th century) (M.H.): The west wall was built before the fortified town (which was created in 1302 by Marguerite de Moncade, viscountess of Bearn) and the bell of 1245, which still rings. The bell tower (33 m) was added in 1520.

Orgue de Busnel (1676) (M.H.): pulpit, font and leaf (16th century), Way of the Cross, statues and paintings (17th and 19th Centuries).

Chapelle Saint-Joseph (1897): stained glass (1900).

== Civil heritage ==
- Maison Carrée de Jeanne d'Albret (16th Century) (MH), home built in the style of the Italian Renaissance. The Maison is organized around its courtyard and garden, testifying to the properties due to the textile industry.

Vaulted galleries on 4 levels, stairs, frame home on the street, wooden railings, fireplaces, floors and ceilings.

Includes an exposition of Béarnais furniture from the 17th through the start of the 19th century, representing the major schools of furniture (Morlaàs, Monein, etc.) of béarnaise ethnology.

Temporary exhibitions and events throughout the year.

== To see ==
- Le musée du béret (Museum of the Beret)
- The making of bells
- La Minoterie (Contemporary art expositions)
- The town market (Tuesday and Saturday mornings)
- The Maison Carrée de Jeanne d'Albret (Said to be the birthplace of King Henri IV)

== Projects ==
- A portion of downtown Nay has been renovated. The first step was the burial of networks and upgrading of roads, pavements and street furniture (benches, etc.) on Rue Gambetta (completed), Rue Clémenceau (completed), Rue Saint-Vincent (completed) and Rue Notre Dame (in progress). The renovation of Allées Chanzy is the second installment. These aisles have wider sidewalks, lined with stone slabs, with modern street furniture, as well as new planting (medlar and palms). Finally, the renovation of the City Square, Place de la République, will complete the phase of work in the city center.
- Transfer of the public retirement home in the way of Chemin de Montreuil (work in progress, structural work completed).
- Construction of a new intermunicipal pool between Chemin de Montjoie and Chemin de Laclaü (formally opened).
- Construction of a new parking lot, to replace la place de la République, which will disappear (Mayor's current draft plans).

== Events ==
- Les fêtes de Nay (Festival of Nay) - a five-day festival approximately falling on 24 August. Numerous festivities occur, including fireworks, during the festival.
- The Cancé Tournament (International Tournament of Rugby Cadets at Corraze-Nay) - Rugby tournament occurring at the Stadium of Nay during Easter weekend.

== Famous persons ==
- Jean Barthet, milliner, born 1920, grew up in Nay
- Damien Traille, rugby player
- Jacques Abbadie, Protestant theologian, born 1654
- Raymond Mastrotto, professional cyclist from 1958 to 1968, nicknamed "le tareau de Nay" (the bull from Nay)
- Pierre Triep-Capdeville, rugby player

== Equipment and education ==
The commune has a primary school (école du fronton), a collège (collège Henri IV) and a municipal swimming pool.

== See also ==
- Communes of the Pyrénées-Atlantiques department
