= Abit =

Abit may refer to:

- Abit, Myanmar, village in Burma
- Abit (Armenian Bitumen), an asphalt production company in Surenavan, Armenia
- Ajay Binay Institute of Technology
- Saint-Abit, commune in France
- Universal Abit, defunct Taiwanese computer brand
