= Lys, Pyrénées-Atlantiques =

Lys
- Commune
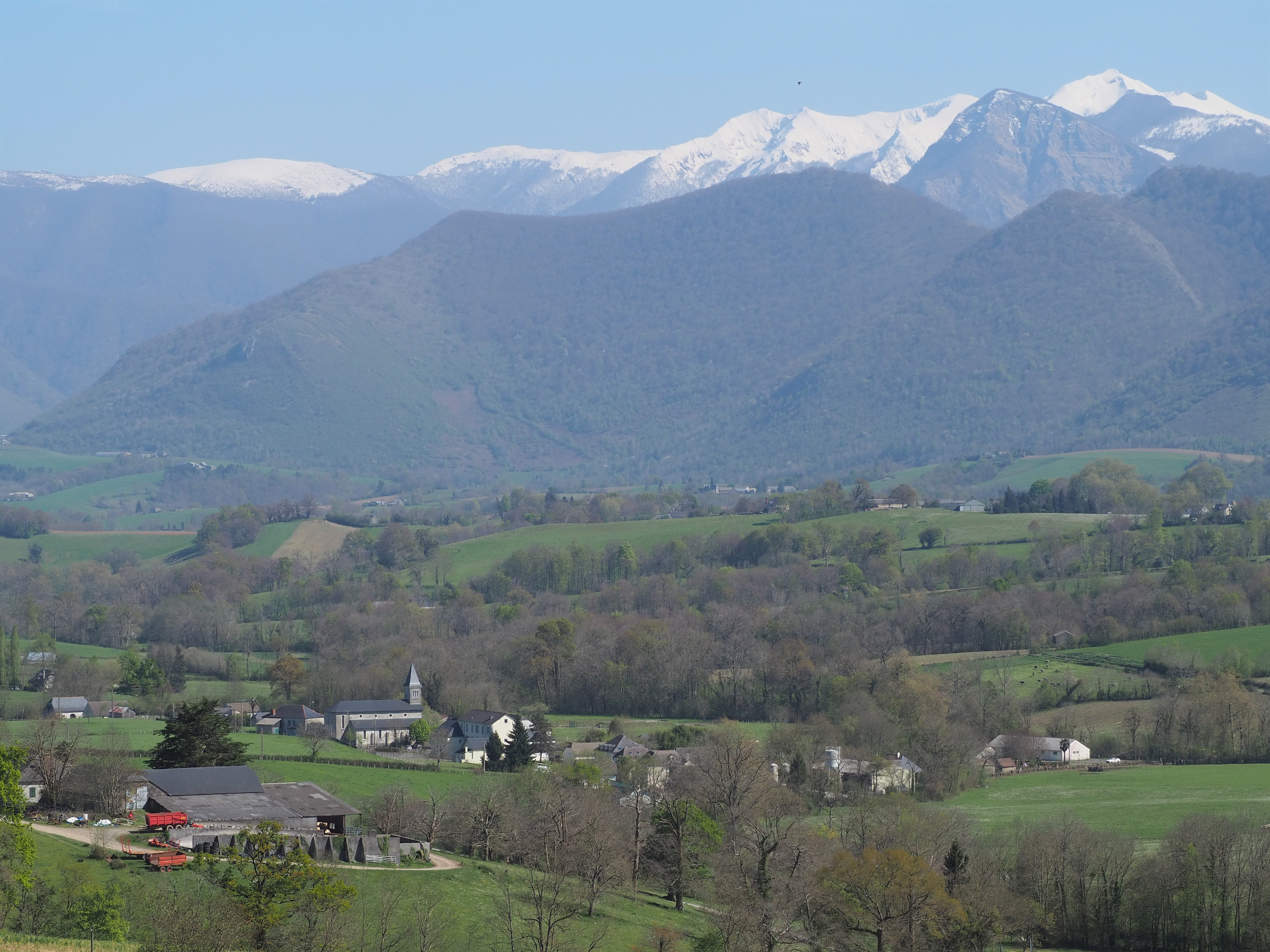
- General view of Lys

- Coat of arms
- Location of Lys
- Location within France Location within Nouvelle-Aquitaine
- Coordinates: 43°07′52″N 0°21′06″W
- Country: France
- Region: Nouvelle-Aquitaine
- Department: Pyrénées-Atlantiques
- Arrondissement: Oloron-Sainte-Marie
- Canton: Oloron-Sainte-Marie-2
- Intercommunality: Vallée d'Ossau

Government
  - Mayor (2020–2026): Nadège Poueymirou Bouchet
- Area^{1}: 15.40 km^{2} (5.95 sq mi)
- Elevation: 424 m (1,391 ft)
- Highest elevation: 510 m (1,670 ft)
- Lowest elevation: 304 m (997 ft)
- Population (2023): 322
  - Density: 20.9/km^{2} (54.2/sq mi)
- Time zone: UTC+01:00 (CET)
  - Summer (DST): UTC+02:00 (CEST)
- INSEE/Postal code: 64363 /64260
- ^{1} French Land Register data, which excludes lakes, ponds, glaciers > 1 km^{2} (0.386 sq mi or 247 acres) and river estuaries.

Lys (French pronunciation: [lis]; Occitan: Lo Lis) is a commune in the Pyrénées-Atlantiques department in southwestern France.

== Geography ==
=== Hydrography ===
The river Landistou, a 12.5 km long tributary of the Béez, passes through the village Lys. Several tributaries of the Landistou (Betbeder, Bonnasserre, Chourrup, Lazerau, Lespereu) also pass through the commune. The northern part of the commune is drained by the river Luz, a 15.2 km long tributary of the Gave de Pau, and some of its tributaries (Gest, Herran, Luz de Casalis). The southern part of the commune is drained by the stream Ruisseau de la Fontaine de Mesplé (Béez basin), and its tributary Ruisseau de Subercase.

=== Localities and Hamlets ===
- lou Boscq
- Vic de Hoges de Baix
- Vic de Hoges de Haut
- Vic de Lis de Baix
- Vic de Lis de Haut

=== Surrounding Communities ===
- Sévignacq-Meyracq to the north
- Haut-de-Bosdarros to the northeast
- Bruges-Capbis-Mifaget to the east
- Sainte-Colome to the southwest
- Louvie-Juzon to the south

== Toponymy ==
The name Lys appears as Lis-Sainte-Colomme (Lily Saint Colomme) from the 1721 census. The name comes from Gascony, and means 'flat land'.

== History ==
Lys was formerly an annex of Sainte-Colome until it acquired municipality status in 1858.

== Administration ==
The current mayor is Nadège Poueymirou Bouchet, in office since 2020.

The town is part of the following intercommunal structures:

- Communauté de communes de la Vallée d'Ossau (Ossau Valley)
- Syndicat de la perception d'Arudy
- SIVU d'assainissement (sanitation) de la vallée d'Ossau
- Ossau Valley water union
- Lower Ossau electric union

== Population ==
Historical population

| Year | Pop. | ±% p.a. |
|---|---|---|
| 1861 | 1,080 | — |
| 1866 | 1,070 | −0.19% |
| 1872 | 1,084 | +0.22% |
| 1876 | 1,040 | −1.03% |
| 1881 | 962 | −1.55% |
| 1886 | 985 | +0.47% |
| 1891 | 998 | +0.26% |
| 1896 | 924 | −1.53% |
| 1901 | 916 | −0.17% |
| 1906 | 908 | −0.18% |
| 1911 | 856 | −1.17% |
| 1921 | 685 | −2.20% |
| 1926 | 657 | −0.83% |
| 1931 | 622 | −1.09% |

| Year | Pop. | ±% p.a. |
|---|---|---|
| 1936 | 621 | −0.03% |
| 1946 | 564 | −0.96% |
| 1954 | 526 | −0.87% |
| 1962 | 518 | −0.19% |
| 1968 | 450 | −2.32% |
| 1975 | 430 | −0.65% |
| 1982 | 412 | −0.61% |
| 1990 | 376 | −1.14% |
| 1999 | 348 | −0.86% |
| 2007 | 354 | +0.21% |
| 2012 | 350 | −0.23% |
| 2017 | 334 | −0.93% |
| 2023 | 322 | −0.61% |

Source: EHESS and INSEE (1968-2023)

== Economy ==
The town's economy is primarily oriented toward agriculture and livestock (sheep, cattle, pigs, mules).

== See also ==
- Ossau Valley
- Communes of the Pyrénées-Atlantiques department
- Sainte-Colome
