= Bruges-Capbis-Mifaget =

- Commune
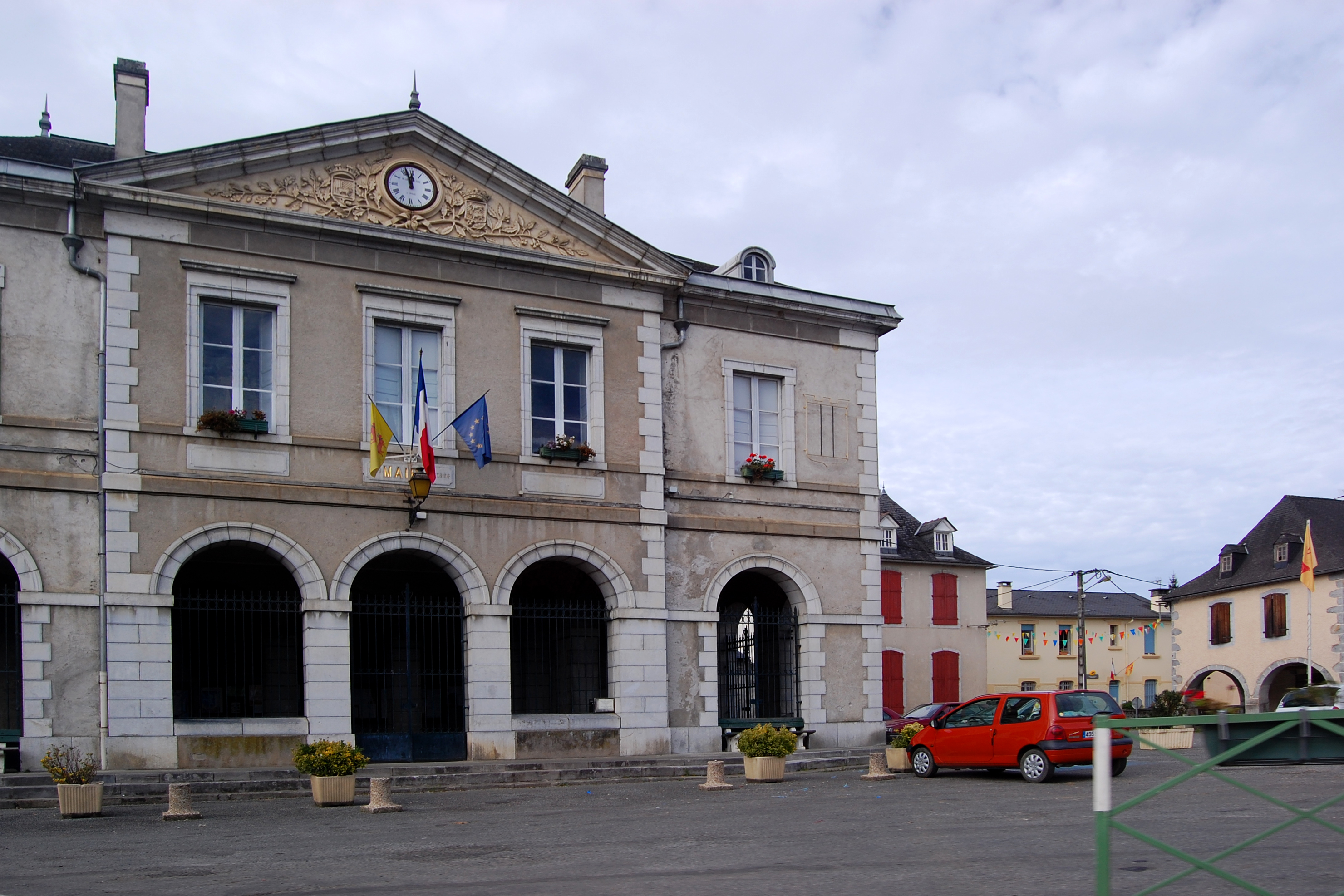
- Town hall

- Coat of arms
- Location of Bruges-Capbis-Mifaget
- Location within France Location within Nouvelle-Aquitaine
- Coordinates: 43°07′42″N 0°18′07″W
- Country: France
- Region: Nouvelle-Aquitaine
- Department: Pyrénées-Atlantiques
- Arrondissement: Pau
- Canton: Ouzom, Gave et Rives du Neez
- Intercommunality: Pays de Nay

Government
  - Mayor (2020–2026): François Lescloupé
- Area^{1}: 16.55 km^{2} (6.39 sq mi)
- Elevation: 316 m (1,037 ft)
- Highest elevation: 473 m (1,552 ft)
- Lowest elevation: 277 m (909 ft)
- Population (2023): 847
  - Density: 51.2/km^{2} (133/sq mi)
- Time zone: UTC+01:00 (CET)
  - Summer (DST): UTC+02:00 (CEST)
- INSEE/Postal code: 64148 /64800
- ^{1} French Land Register data, which excludes lakes, ponds, glaciers > 1 km^{2} (0.386 sq mi or 247 acres) and river estuaries.

Bruges-Capbis-Mifaget (French pronunciation: [bʁyʒ kabis mifaʒɛ]; Occitan: Brutges, Capbis e Mieihaget) is a commune in the Pyrénées-Atlantiques department in southwestern France. It was created in 1973 by the merger of three former communes: Bruges, Capbis and Mifaget.

People from the commune are called "Brugeois" in French.

== Geography ==
Bruges-Capbis-Mifaget is situated on 16.55 square kilometres (6.39 sq mi) of rolling hills in the far foothills of the Pyrenees. It is located on the east side of the department, 25 kilometres (16 mi) southeast of Pau. Bruges-Capbis-Mifaget is accessible by departmental routes 35, 232, 287, and 335.

=== Bordering communes ===
- Haut-de-Bosdarros to the north
- Arros-de-Nay to the northeast
- Lys to the northwest
- Asson to the south and east
- Arthez-d'Asson to the southeast
- Louvie-Juzon to the southwest

== See also ==
- Communes of the Pyrénées-Atlantiques department
