= Béez =

- Location within France Location within Nouvelle-Aquitaine

Location
- Country: France

Physical characteristics
- Source
  - location: South of Pau
  - elevation: 1,400 m (4,600 ft)
- Mouth: Gave de Pau
  - coordinates: 43.1751°N 0.2595°W
- Length: 24 km (15 mi)

Basin features
- Progression: Gave de Pau→ Gaves réunis→ Adour→ Atlantic Ocean

The Béez, is a left tributary of the Gave de Pau, in Béarn (Pyrénées-Atlantiques), in the Southwest of France. It flows into the Gave de Pau upstream from Pau, between the Ouzoum and the Luz. It is 24.1 km (15.0 mi) long.

== Name ==
The name Béez, which presents some parallelism with those of the Léez or the Néez, is in fact a variant of the name of the Baïse.

The names of the Bès, a tributary of the neighboring Luz, and of the Bez, a tributary of the Midouze, are related.

== Geography ==
The Béez rises on the slopes of the Pic Durban, elevation 1,700 metres (5,600 ft), where it is known as the Bazest, Baseigt or Baset. It flows north into the Gave de Pau in Nay.

== Départements and towns ==
- Pyrénées-Atlantiques: Pé-de-Hourat, Capbis, Nay.

== Main tributaries ==
Baseigt / Baset

- (R) the Izou, from the Izou Pass (847 m),
- (L) the Cau de Heus

Béez

- (L) the Lestarrès / Lestarrezoû, from Louvie-Juzon.
  - (R) the Escourreix
- (R) the Soulens, from the Sarramayou (491 m).
- (L) the Landistou, from Sainte-Colome, Lys and Bruges.
