= Canton of Ouzom, Gave et Rives du Neez =

Coordinates: 43.18°N 0.26°W

The canton of Ouzom, Gave et Rives du Neez is an administrative division of the Pyrénées-Atlantiques department, southwestern France. It was created at the French canton reorganisation which came into effect in March 2015. Its seat is in Nay.

It consists of the following communes:

1. Aressy
2. Arros-de-Nay
3. Arthez-d'Asson
4. Assat
5. Asson
6. Baliros
7. Bosdarros
8. Bourdettes
9. Bruges-Capbis-Mifaget
10. Gan
11. Haut-de-Bosdarros
12. Meillon
13. Narcastet
14. Nay
15. Pardies-Piétat
16. Rontignon
17. Saint-Abit
18. Uzos
