= Abit, Myanmar =

Village in Mon State, Burma

Coordinates: 16°15′54″N 97°33′11″E

Abit (Burmese: အဘစ်) is a village in Mon State, Burma.
