= Assat =

- Commune
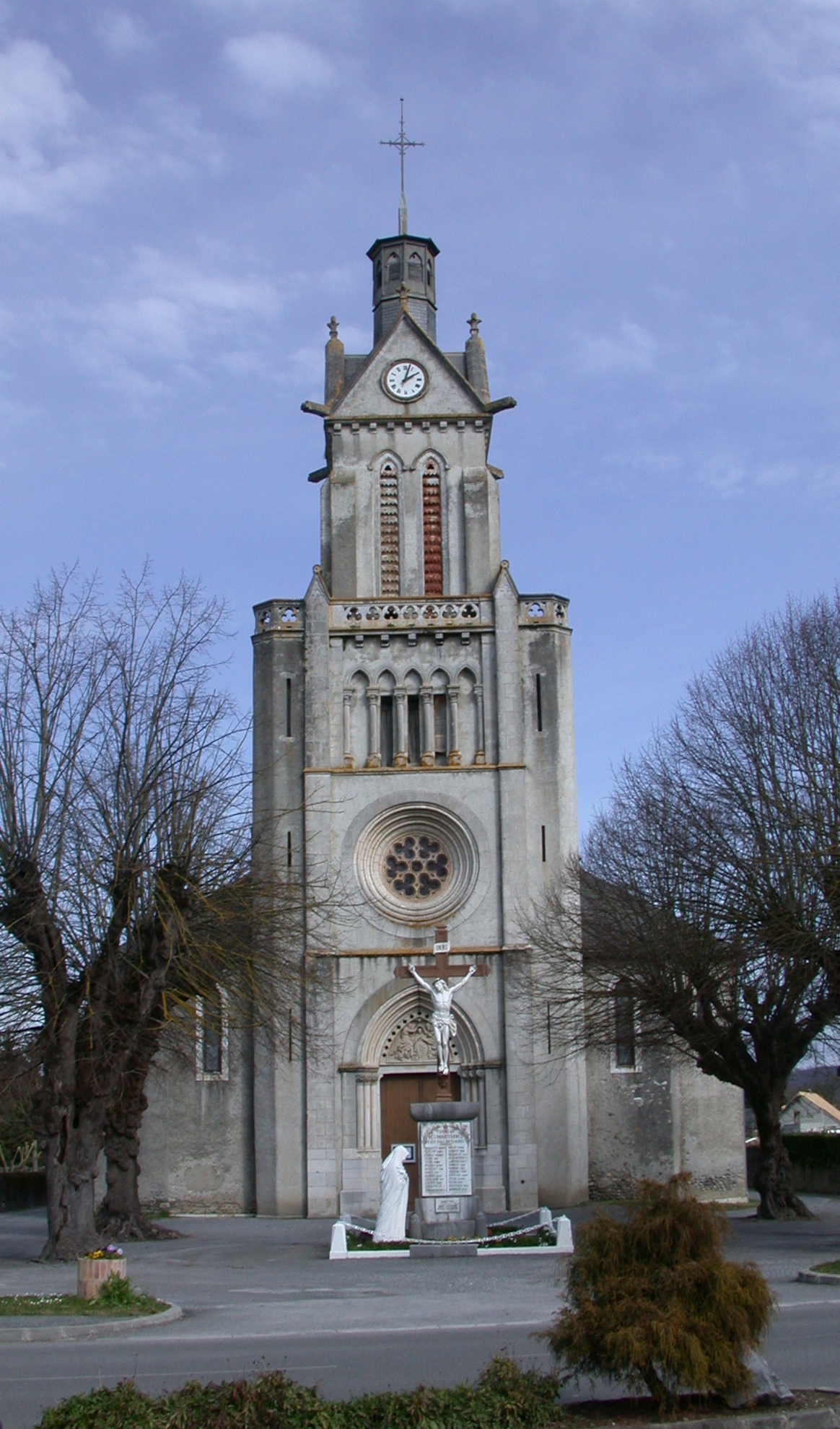
- The church of Assat
- Location of Assat
- Location within France Location within Nouvelle-Aquitaine
- Coordinates: 43°15′00″N 0°17′57″W
- Country: France
- Region: Nouvelle-Aquitaine
- Department: Pyrénées-Atlantiques
- Arrondissement: Pau
- Canton: Ouzom, Gave et Rives du Neez
- Intercommunality: CC Pays de Nay

Government
  - Mayor (2020–2026): Jean-Christophe Rhaut
- Area^{1}: 9.47 km^{2} (3.66 sq mi)
- Elevation: 210 m (690 ft)
- Highest elevation: 323 m (1,060 ft)
- Lowest elevation: 199 m (653 ft)
- Population (2023): 2,068
  - Density: 218/km^{2} (566/sq mi)
- Time zone: UTC+01:00 (CET)
  - Summer (DST): UTC+02:00 (CEST)
- INSEE/Postal code: 64067 /64510
- ^{1} French Land Register data, which excludes lakes, ponds, glaciers > 1 km^{2} (0.386 sq mi or 247 acres) and river estuaries.

Assat (French pronunciation: [asat]) is a commune in the Pyrénées-Atlantiques department in southwestern France. It is located at the foot of the Pyrenees. Assat station has rail connections to Tarbes, Pau, Bordeaux and Bayonne. This little bastide was built at the end of the 12th century. Gaston Fébus lived there.

== Population ==
Historical population
Year	Pop.	±% p.a.
1968	740	—
1975	865	+2.25%
1982	1,055	+2.88%
1990	1,244	+2.08%
1999	1,479	+1.94%
2007	1,645	+1.34%
2012	1,776	+1.54%
2017	1,828	+0.58%
2023	2,068	+2.08%
Source: INSEE

== See also ==
- Communes of the Pyrénées-Atlantiques department
