= Narcastet =

- Commune
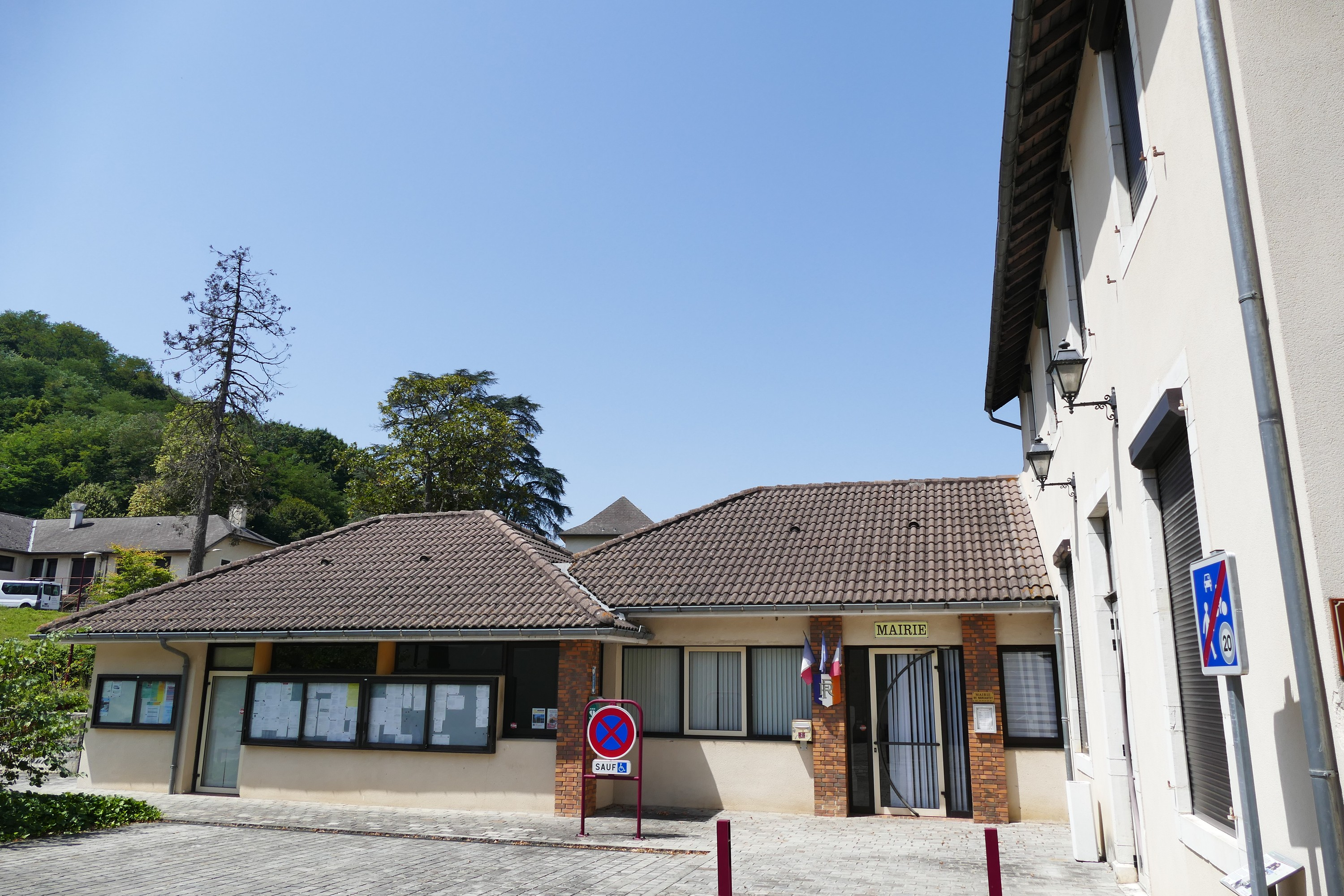
- Narcastet Town hall
- Location of Narcastet
- Location within France Location within Nouvelle-Aquitaine
- Coordinates: 43°15′06″N 0°19′07″W
- Country: France
- Region: Nouvelle-Aquitaine
- Department: Pyrénées-Atlantiques
- Arrondissement: Pau
- Canton: Ouzom, Gave et Rives du Neez
- Intercommunality: CC Pays de Nay

Government
  - Mayor (2020–2026): Jean-Pierre Faux
- Area^{1}: 4.65 km^{2} (1.80 sq mi)
- Elevation: 220 m (720 ft)
- Highest elevation: 379 m (1,243 ft)
- Lowest elevation: 192 m (630 ft)
- Population (2023): 753
  - Density: 162/km^{2} (419/sq mi)
- Time zone: UTC+01:00 (CET)
  - Summer (DST): UTC+02:00 (CEST)
- INSEE/Postal code: 64413 /64510
- ^{1} French Land Register data, which excludes lakes, ponds, glaciers > 1 km^{2} (0.386 sq mi or 247 acres) and river estuaries.

Narcastet (French pronunciation: [naʁkastɛt]; Gascon: Narcastèth) is a commune in the Pyrénées-Atlantiques department in south-western France.

== See also ==
- Communes of the Pyrénées-Atlantiques department
