= Haut-de-Bosdarros =

- Commune
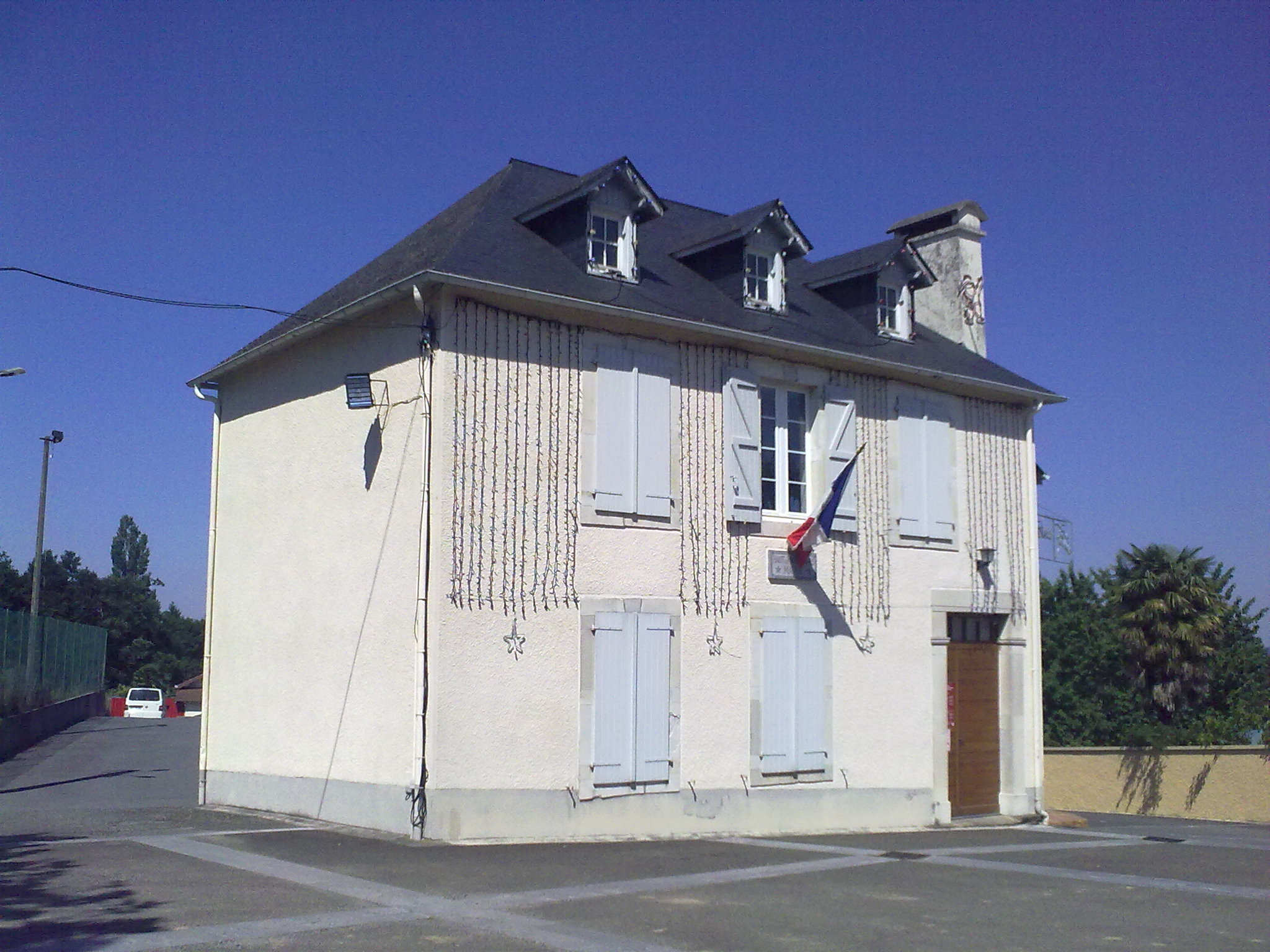
- Town Hall of Haut-de-Bosdarros

- Coat of arms
- Location of Haut-de-Bosdarros
- Location within France Location within Nouvelle-Aquitaine
- Coordinates: 43°10′21″N 0°19′50″W
- Country: France
- Region: Nouvelle-Aquitaine
- Department: Pyrénées-Atlantiques
- Arrondissement: Pau
- Canton: Ouzom, Gave et Rives du Neez
- Intercommunality: Pays de Nay

Government
  - Mayor (2020–2026): Cédric Madec
- Area^{1}: 12.31 km^{2} (4.75 sq mi)
- Elevation: 262 m (860 ft)
- Highest elevation: 445 m (1,460 ft)
- Lowest elevation: 251 m (823 ft)
- Population (2023): 322
  - Density: 26.2/km^{2} (67.7/sq mi)
- Time zone: UTC+01:00 (CET)
  - Summer (DST): UTC+02:00 (CEST)
- INSEE/Postal code: 64257 /64800
- ^{1} French Land Register data, which excludes lakes, ponds, glaciers > 1 km^{2} (0.386 sq mi or 247 acres) and river estuaries.

Haut-de-Bosdarros (French pronunciation: [o də bɔsdaʁɔs]; Occitan: Haut deu Bòsc d'Arròs) is a commune in the Pyrénées-Atlantiques department in south-western France.

== See also ==
- Communes of the Pyrénées-Atlantiques department
