= Igon =

Igon Aigon
- Commune
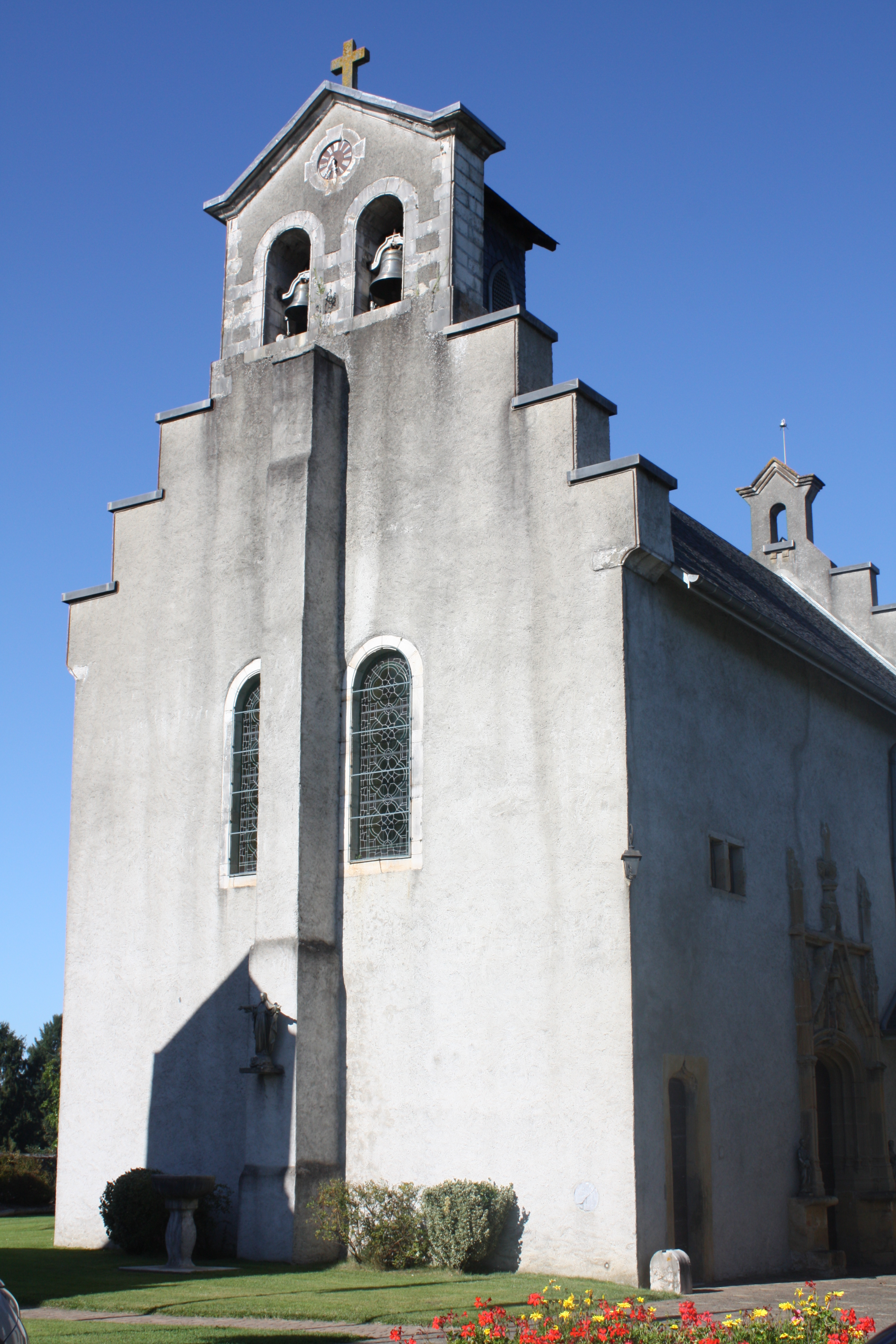
- The church of Saint-Vincent, in Igon
- Location of Igon
- Location within France Location within Nouvelle-Aquitaine
- Coordinates: 43°09′38″N 0°13′51″W
- Country: France
- Region: Nouvelle-Aquitaine
- Department: Pyrénées-Atlantiques
- Arrondissement: Pau
- Canton: Vallées de l'Ousse et du Lagoin
- Intercommunality: Pays de Nay

Government
  - Mayor (2020–2026): Marc Labat
- Area^{1}: 5.33 km^{2} (2.06 sq mi)
- Elevation: 274 m (899 ft)
- Highest elevation: 362 m (1,188 ft)
- Lowest elevation: 255 m (837 ft)
- Population (2023): 1,028
  - Density: 193/km^{2} (500/sq mi)
- Time zone: UTC+01:00 (CET)
  - Summer (DST): UTC+02:00 (CEST)
- INSEE/Postal code: 64270 /64800
- ^{1} French Land Register data, which excludes lakes, ponds, glaciers > 1 km^{2} (0.386 sq mi or 247 acres) and river estuaries.

Igon (French pronunciation: [iɡɔ̃]; Occitan: Aigon) is a commune in the Pyrénées-Atlantiques department in southwestern France.

== See also ==
- Communes of the Pyrénées-Atlantiques department
