= Bosdarros =

- Commune
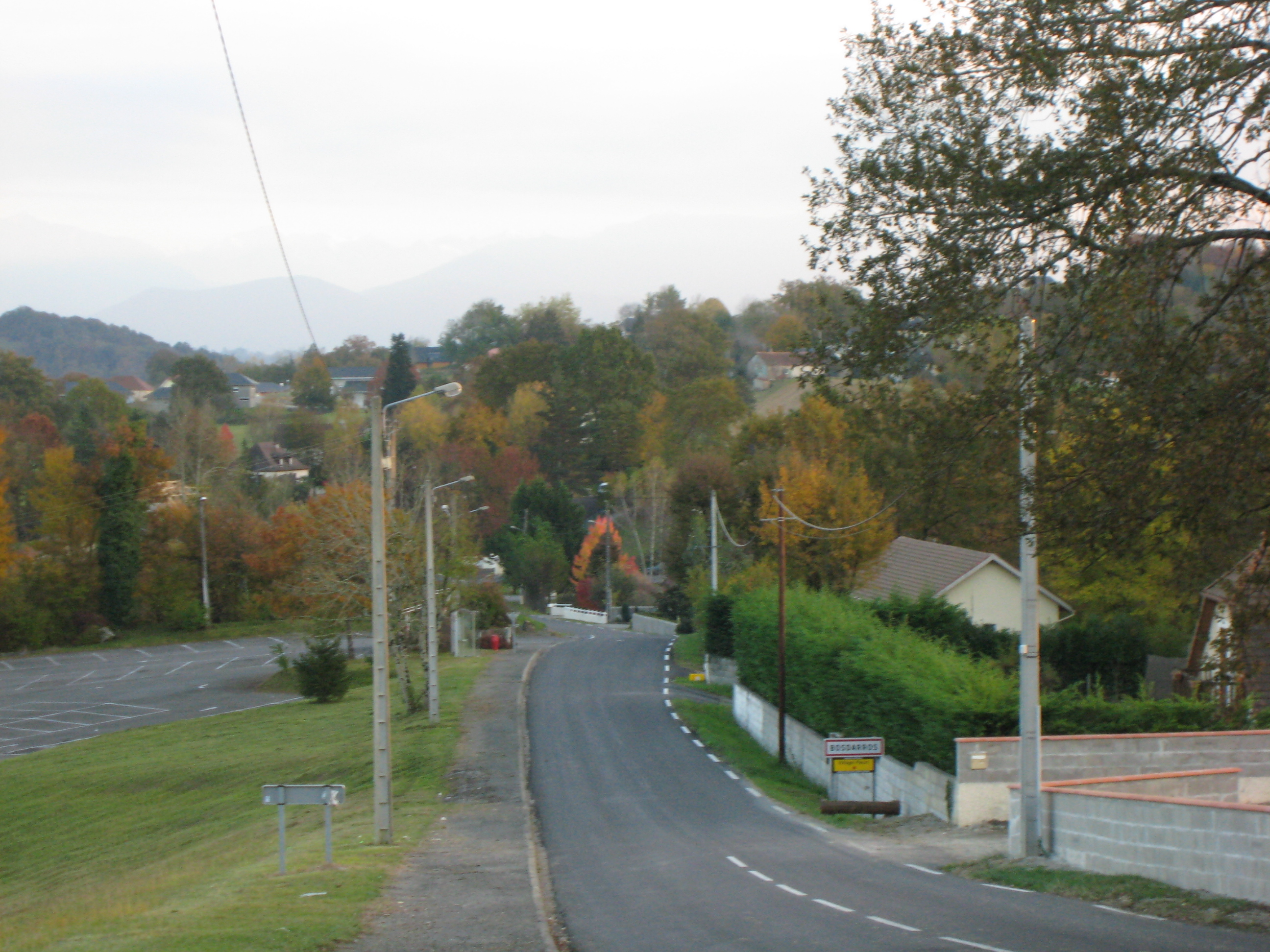
- The road into Bosdarros

- Coat of arms
- Location of Bosdarros
- Location within France Location within Nouvelle-Aquitaine
- Coordinates: 43°12′38″N 0°21′37″W
- Country: France
- Region: Nouvelle-Aquitaine
- Department: Pyrénées-Atlantiques
- Arrondissement: Pau
- Canton: Ouzom, Gave et Rives du Neez
- Intercommunality: CA Pau Béarn Pyrénées

Government
  - Mayor (2020–2026): Jean-Pierre Lannes
- Area^{1}: 24.77 km^{2} (9.56 sq mi)
- Elevation: 280 m (920 ft)
- Highest elevation: 443 m (1,453 ft)
- Lowest elevation: 212 m (696 ft)
- Population (2023): 962
  - Density: 38.8/km^{2} (101/sq mi)
- Time zone: UTC+01:00 (CET)
  - Summer (DST): UTC+02:00 (CEST)
- INSEE/Postal code: 64139 /64290
- ^{1} French Land Register data, which excludes lakes, ponds, glaciers > 1 km^{2} (0.386 sq mi or 247 acres) and river estuaries.

Bosdarros (French pronunciation: [bɔsdaʁɔs]; Occitan: Lo Bòsc d'Arròs) is a commune in the Pyrénées-Atlantiques department in southwestern France.

== See also ==
- Communes of the Pyrénées-Atlantiques department
