= Bourdettes =

- Commune
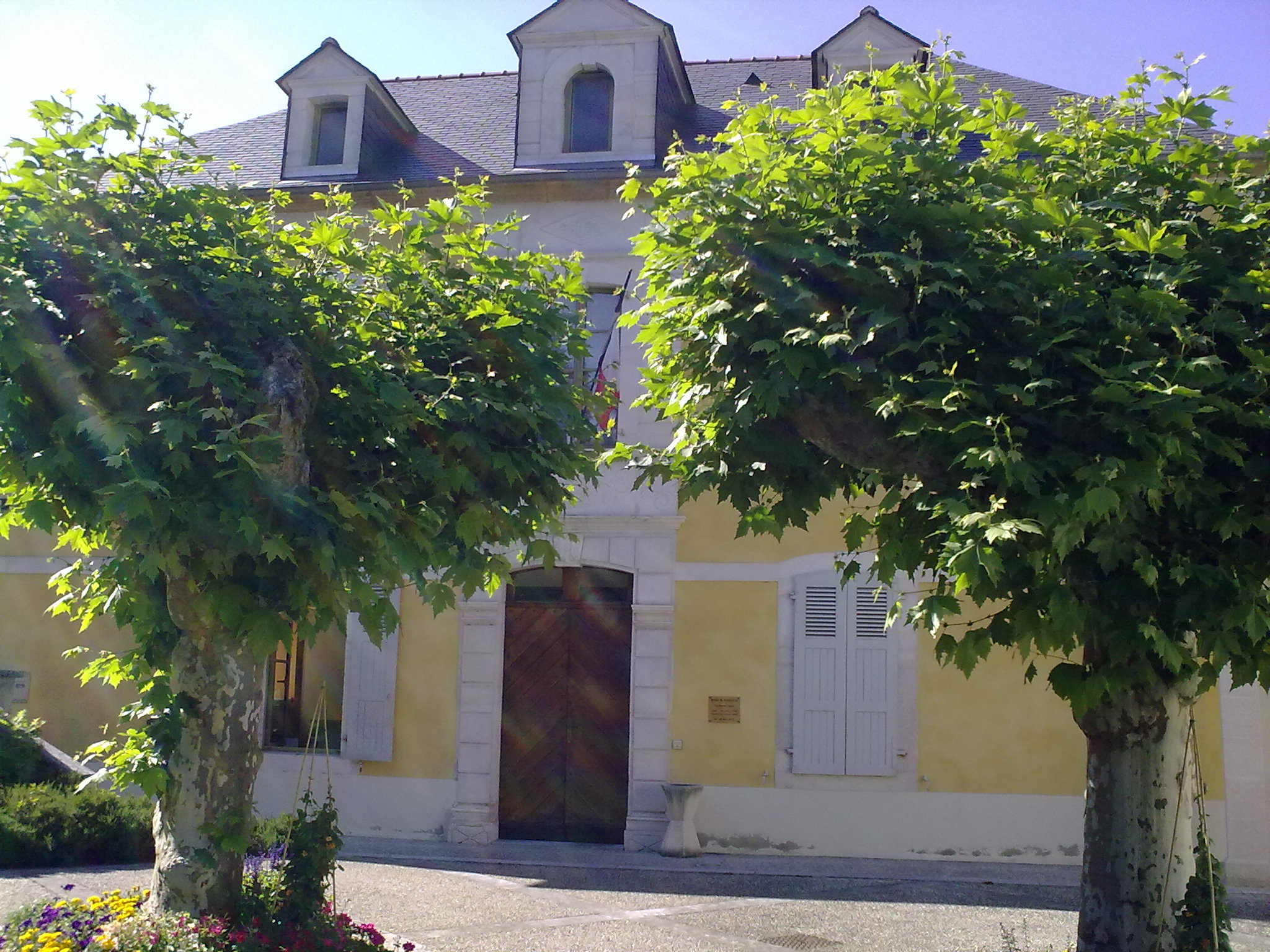
- Town hall
- Location of Bourdettes
- Location within France Location within Nouvelle-Aquitaine
- Coordinates: 43°11′50″N 0°16′26″W
- Country: France
- Region: Nouvelle-Aquitaine
- Department: Pyrénées-Atlantiques
- Arrondissement: Pau
- Canton: Ouzom, Gave et Rives du Neez

Government
  - Mayor (2020–2026): Philippe Lacroux
- Area^{1}: 2.24 km^{2} (0.86 sq mi)
- Elevation: 239 m (784 ft)
- Highest elevation: 388 m (1,273 ft)
- Lowest elevation: 233 m (764 ft)
- Population (2023): 503
  - Density: 225/km^{2} (582/sq mi)
- Time zone: UTC+01:00 (CET)
  - Summer (DST): UTC+02:00 (CEST)
- INSEE/Postal code: 64145 /64800
- ^{1} French Land Register data, which excludes lakes, ponds, glaciers > 1 km^{2} (0.386 sq mi or 247 acres) and river estuaries.

Bourdettes (French pronunciation: [buʁdɛt]; Occitan: Bordetas) is a commune in the Pyrénées-Atlantiques department in southwestern France.

== See also ==
- Communes of the Pyrénées-Atlantiques department
