= Pardies-Piétat =

- Commune
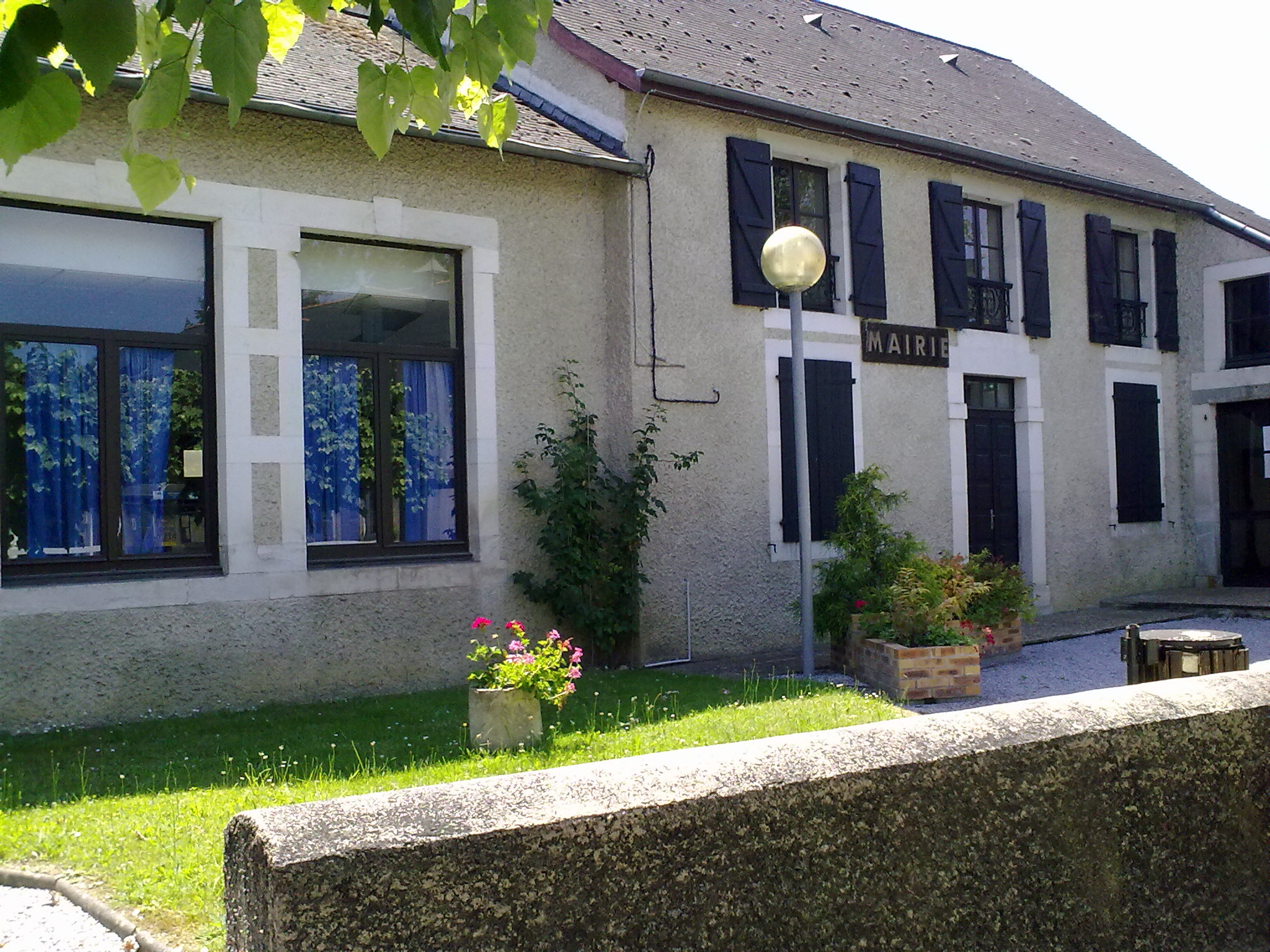
- Town Hall of Pardies-Piétat
- Location of Pardies-Piétat
- Location within France Location within Nouvelle-Aquitaine
- Coordinates: 43°12′51″N 0°17′55″W
- Country: France
- Region: Nouvelle-Aquitaine
- Department: Pyrénées-Atlantiques
- Arrondissement: Pau
- Canton: Ouzom, Gave et Rives du Neez
- Intercommunality: Pays de Nay

Government
  - Mayor (2020–2026): Pascal Cabanne
- Area^{1}: 7.47 km^{2} (2.88 sq mi)
- Highest elevation: 399 m (1,309 ft)
- Lowest elevation: 216 m (709 ft)
- Population (2023): 434
  - Density: 58.1/km^{2} (150/sq mi)
- Time zone: UTC+01:00 (CET)
  - Summer (DST): UTC+02:00 (CEST)
- INSEE/Postal code: 64444 /64800
- ^{1} French Land Register data, which excludes lakes, ponds, glaciers > 1 km^{2} (0.386 sq mi or 247 acres) and river estuaries.

Pardies-Piétat (French pronunciation: [paʁdis pjetat]; Occitan: Pardias-Pietat) is a commune in the Pyrénées-Atlantiques department in south-western France.

== See also ==
- Communes of the Pyrénées-Atlantiques department
