= Louvie-Juzon =

- Commune
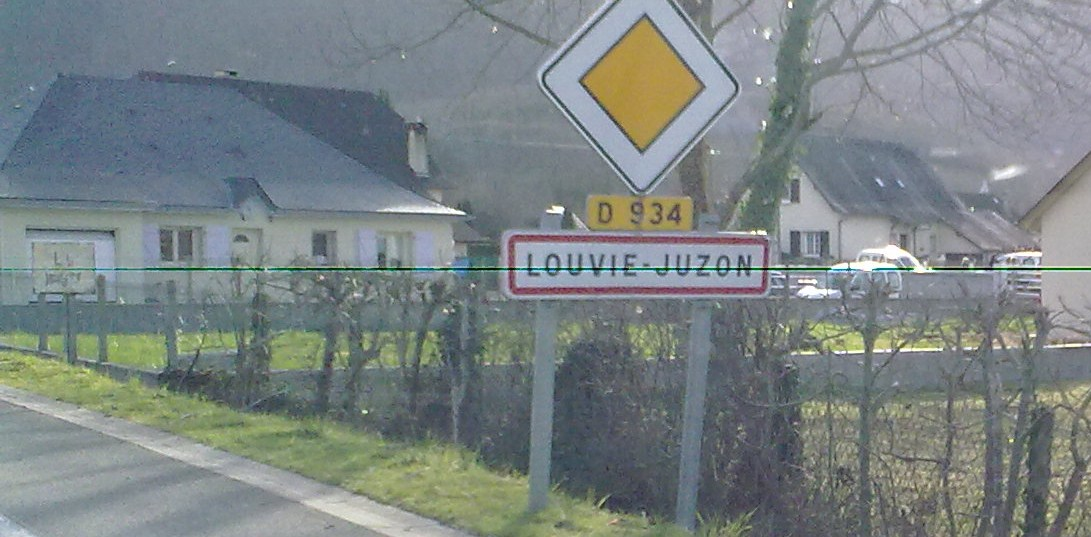
- Entrance
- Location of Louvie-Juzon
- Location within France Location within Nouvelle-Aquitaine
- Coordinates: 43°05′18″N 0°25′02″W
- Country: France
- Region: Nouvelle-Aquitaine
- Department: Pyrénées-Atlantiques
- Arrondissement: Oloron-Sainte-Marie
- Canton: Oloron-Sainte-Marie-2
- Intercommunality: Vallée d'Ossau

Government
  - Mayor (2020–2026): Patrick Labernadie
- Area^{1}: 55.65 km^{2} (21.49 sq mi)
- Elevation: 419 m (1,375 ft)
- Highest elevation: 2,038 m (6,686 ft)
- Lowest elevation: 318 m (1,043 ft)
- Population (2023): 1,058
  - Density: 19.01/km^{2} (49.24/sq mi)
- Time zone: UTC+01:00 (CET)
  - Summer (DST): UTC+02:00 (CEST)
- INSEE/Postal code: 64353 /64260
- ^{1} French Land Register data, which excludes lakes, ponds, glaciers > 1 km^{2} (0.386 sq mi or 247 acres) and river estuaries.

Louvie-Juzon (French pronunciation: [luvi ʒyzɔ̃]; Occitan: Lobier de Baish) is a commune in the Pyrénées-Atlantiques department, Nouvelle-Aquitaine, southwestern France.

== See also ==
- Ossau Valley
- Communes of the Pyrénées-Atlantiques department
