= Saint-Abit =

- Commune
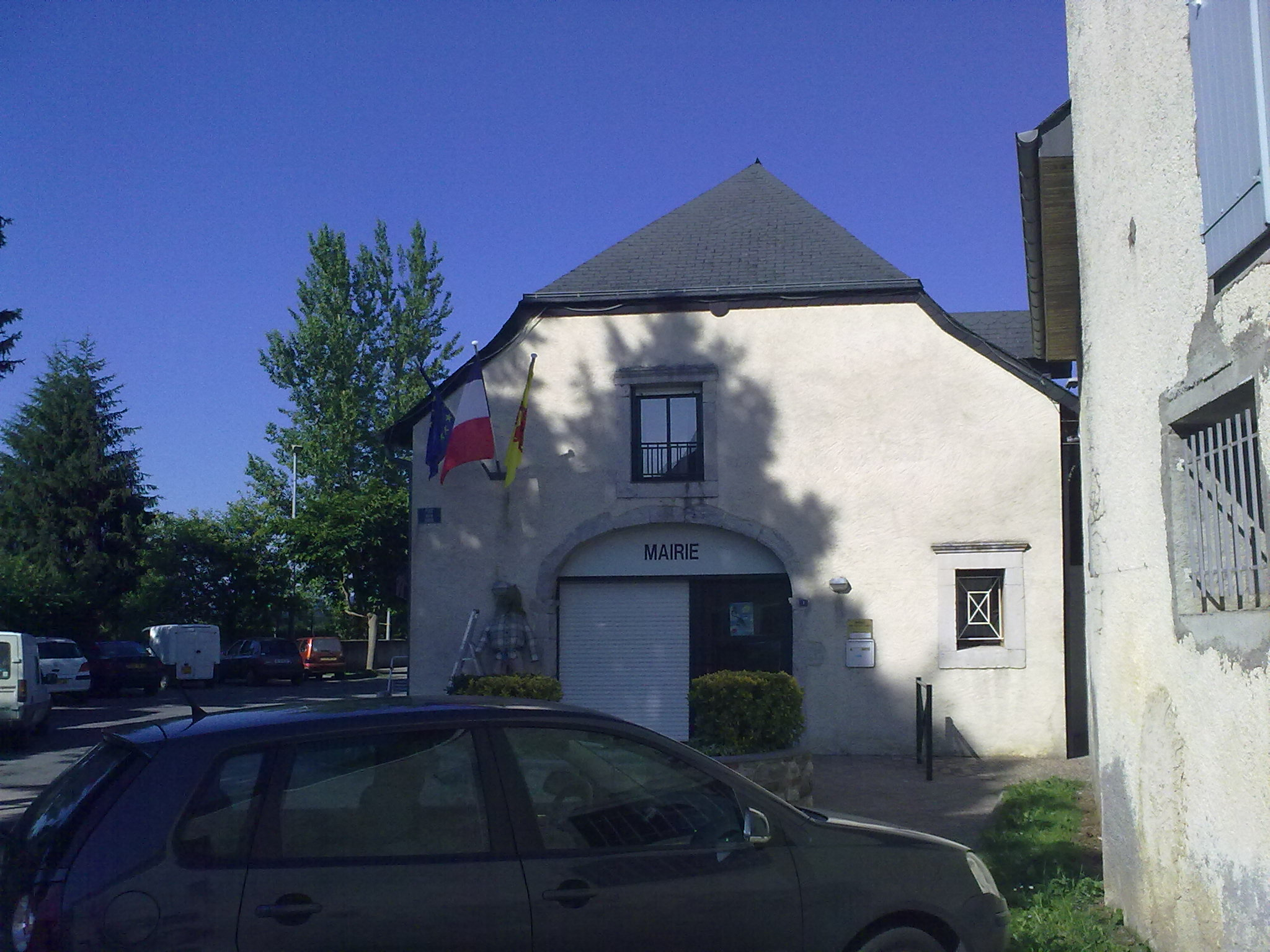
- Town Hall of Saint-Abit
- Location of Saint-Abit
- Location within France Location within Nouvelle-Aquitaine
- Coordinates: 43°12′N 0°17′W
- Country: France
- Region: Nouvelle-Aquitaine
- Department: Pyrénées-Atlantiques
- Arrondissement: Pau
- Canton: Ouzom, Gave et Rives du Neez

Government
  - Mayor (2020–2026): Michel Cazet
- Area^{1}: 4.22 km^{2} (1.63 sq mi)
- Elevation: 236 m (774 ft)
- Highest elevation: 384 m (1,260 ft)
- Lowest elevation: 224 m (735 ft)
- Population (2023): 294
  - Density: 69.7/km^{2} (180/sq mi)
- Time zone: UTC+01:00 (CET)
  - Summer (DST): UTC+02:00 (CEST)
- INSEE/Postal code: 64469 /64800
- ^{1} French Land Register data, which excludes lakes, ponds, glaciers > 1 km^{2} (0.386 sq mi or 247 acres) and river estuaries.

Saint-Abit (French pronunciation: [sɛ̃t‿abit]; Occitan: Sent Avit) is a commune in the Pyrénées-Atlantiques department in south-western France.

== See also ==
- Communes of the Pyrénées-Atlantiques department
