= Gave de Pau =

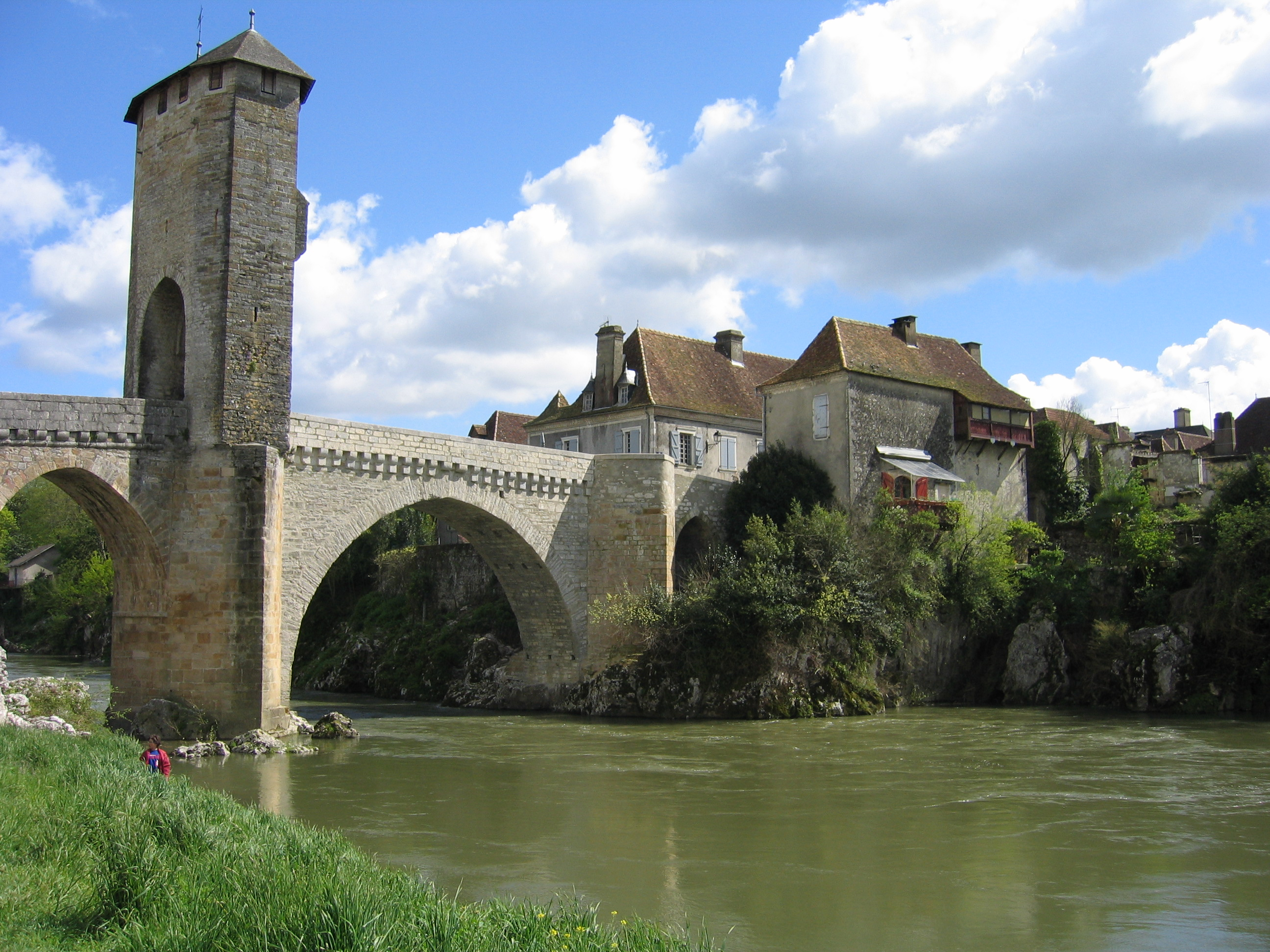
- Gave de Pau in Orthez

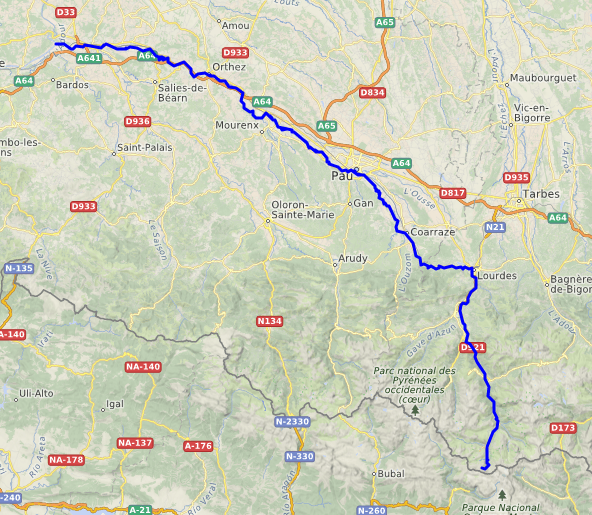

Location
- Country: France

Physical characteristics
- Source
  - location: Pyrenees
- Mouth
  - location: Gaves réunis
  - coordinates: 43°32′24″N 1°5′24″W
- Length: 181.3 km (112.7 mi)
- Basin size: 5,200 km^{2} (2,000 mi^{2})
- Discharge
  - average: 82 m^{3}/s (2,900 cu ft/s)

Basin features
- Progression: Gaves réunis→ Adour→ Atlantic Ocean

The Gave de Pau (French pronunciation: [ɡav də po]) is a river of south-western France. It takes its name from the city of Pau, through which it flows. The river is 181.3 kilometres (112.7 mi) long (190.7 kilometres (118.5 mi) including the Gaves réunis), and although its source is considered to be on the Cirque de Gavarnie in the Pyrenees mountains, it is also fed by waters from the slopes of Monte Perdido in Spain. From the Lago Helado on the slopes of Perdido, water flows through a cave system to emerge from the Resurgence Brulle via the Grotte Devaux on the French side of the border. The Gave de Pau joins the Gave d'Oloron in Peyrehorade to form the about 9-kilometre (6 mi) long Gaves réunis (united Gaves), which is a left tributary of the Adour. The Gaves réunis is often considered to be part of the Gave de Pau.

Its main tributaries are the Béez, the Néez, the Ouzoum and the Ousse.

The Gave de Pau flows through the following départements and towns:

- Hautes-Pyrénées: Argelès-Gazost, Lourdes.
- Pyrénées-Atlantiques: Pau, Orthez.
- Landes: Peyrehorade.

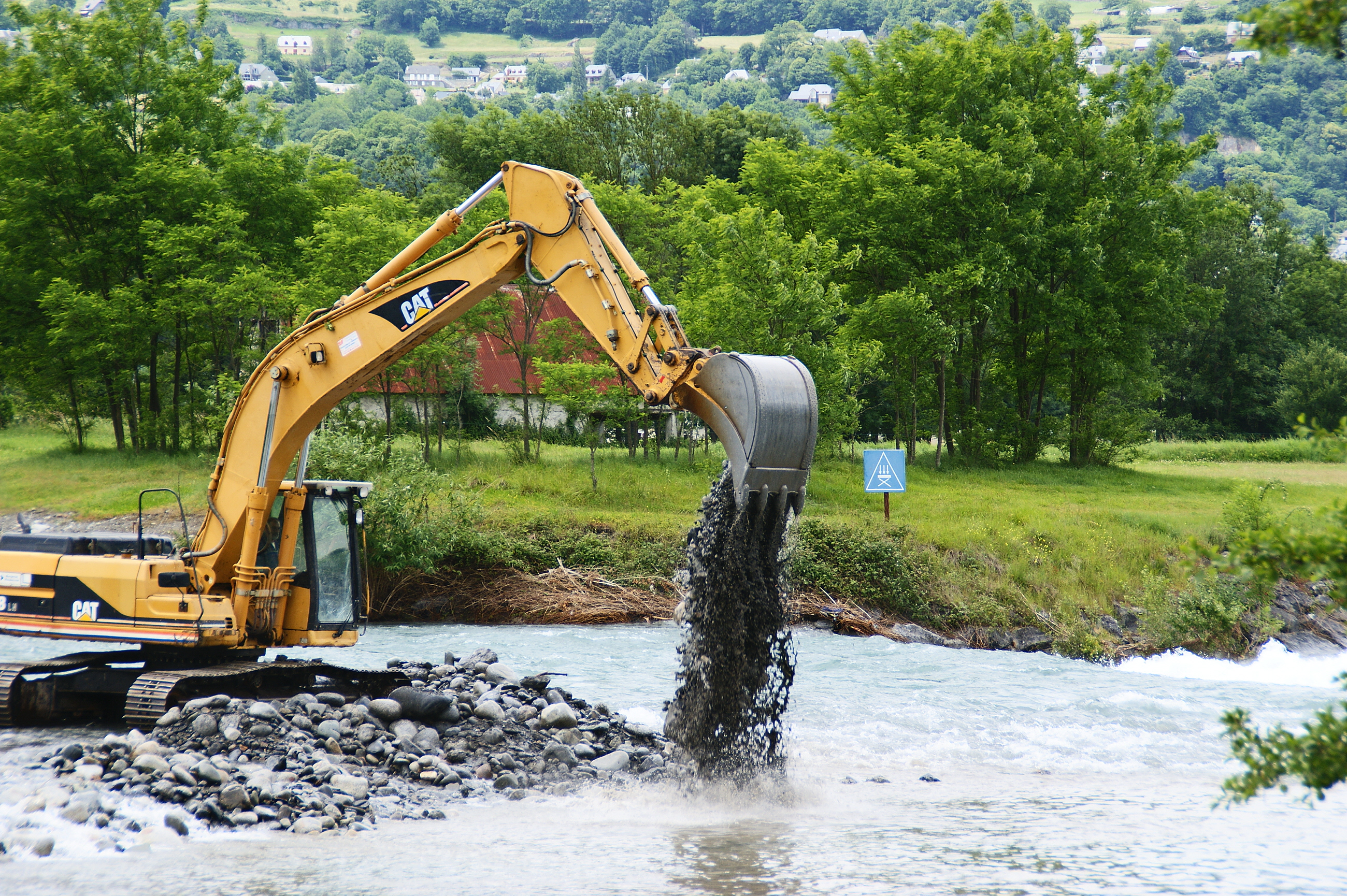
Maintenance work on the bed of the river
