= Rallye des Pyrénées =

Motorcycle competition

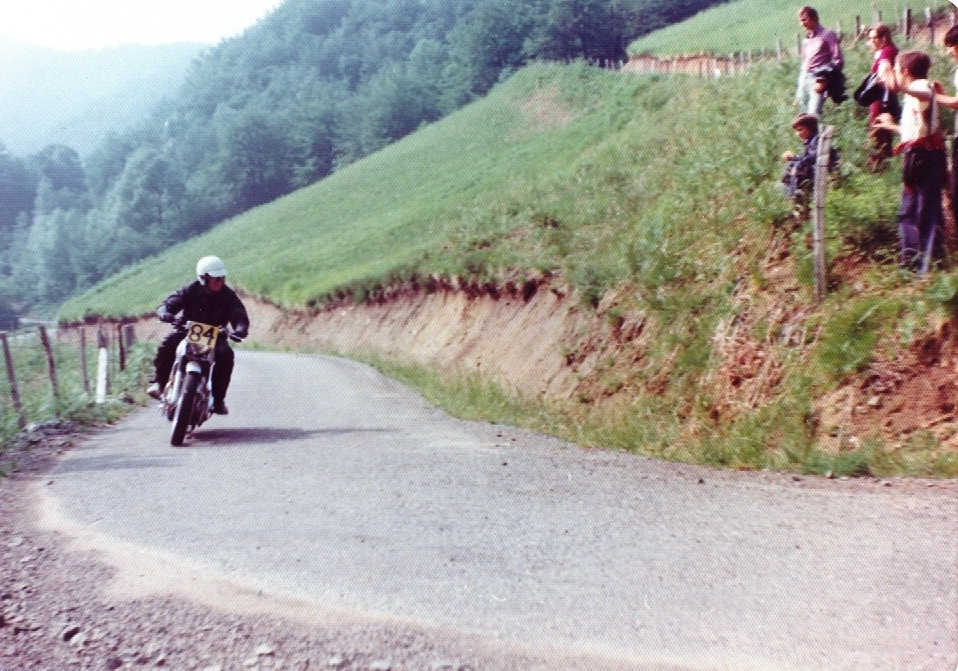
Spectators watch a competitor at the 1975 Circuit des Pyrenees

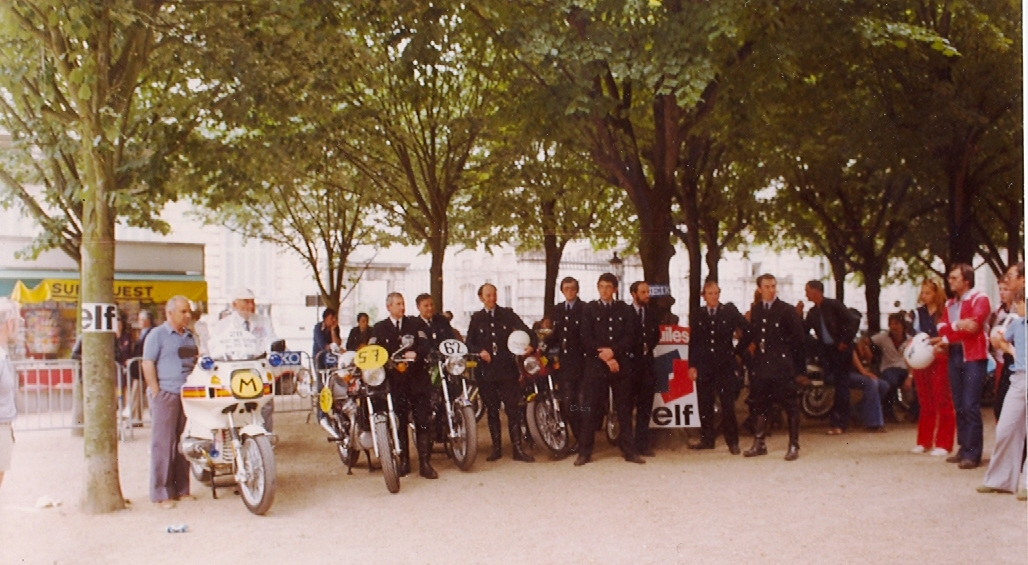
British police team in Pau for the 1979 Rallye des Pyrenees . The motorcycle to the left with the 'M' plate is a rally marshal

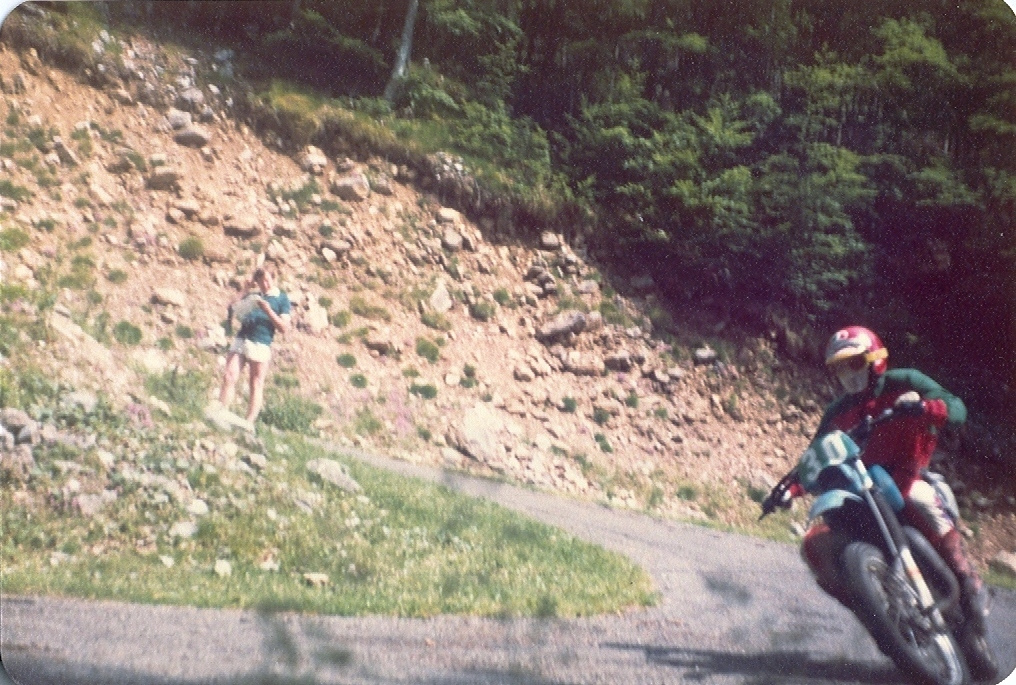
A competitor takes a hairpin bend around Gourette

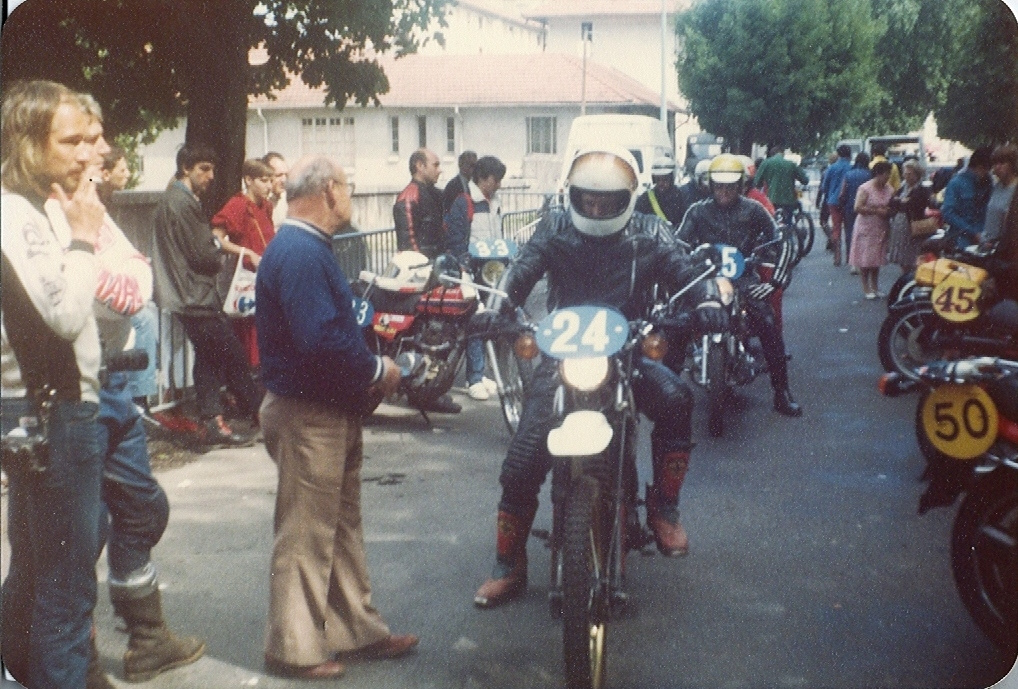
Competitors gather at the start in Pau having been awarded their starting numbers. Number 24 is John Gaut of Essex Police.

The Rallye des Pyrénées, also known as the Circuit des Pyrénées and formerly as the Pau-San Sebastián Rally, was a two-day international motorcycle competition in late June set in the Pyrenees mountains of France and Spain, consisting of about 400 miles (640 km) of timed trials and hill-climbs. The competition, started in 1951 by the Union Motorcycliste Paloise, attracted a high proportion of competitors from European police and military units. French motorcycle periodical, Moto Revue, stated, "The Circuit des Pyrénées confronts the riders with many hazards and to cross the finish line is itself a fine reward", whilst motorcycle writer Cook Neilson described the competition as "the ultimate remaining Racer Road experience". British magazine, Motor Cycle Sport called the 1978 event, "an anachronism and dangerous" yet "one of those phenomenal events that should not really be allowed but is".

== Description ==
The route initially took in the Spanish Pyrenees and French Pyrenees from Pau in the South of France to San Sebastián in Northern Spain. However, by 1978 due to concerns of the Spanish police, and the French police's own security concerns in the Basque region, the competition was instead held exclusively in France.

The competition route in 1981 for instance consisted of a 320 km (200 miles) loop to the south-east of Pau on one day and a 325 km (202 miles) loop to the north-west of that city the following day. The motorcycles had to be street legal and, except for six special timed sections, the competitors shared the route, consisting mainly of narrow winding rough mountain roads, with the public and kept to the legal speed limits. Prizes were awarded for winners according to the motorcycle engine size (125 cc, 175 cc, 250 cc, 350 cc, 500 cc, 750 cc and over) with special prizes for sidecar combinations, teams and individual special merit with categories for institutional and civilian entrants.

The French part of the route starting and finishing in Pau (where the motorcycles would take part in a formal procession beforehand) would take in the mountain passes of Ferrières, Arbéost, Aubisque, Soulor and Gourette whilst the Spanish side, when run, took in Jaizkibel and Oyarzun. Less mountainous venues would include the Foret D'Issaux, L' Hopital D'Orion, and Bois Du Bager. Competitors were allowed to navigate the route for familiarisation prior to the actual competition itself.

== End of the Rallye des Pyrénées ==
The competition was strongly associated with the organisation, engineering skills and hospitality of Roland and Ginette Roussel of the Union Motorcycliste Paloise, and with their retirement and the withdrawal of long-time sponsor, French oil company Elf, by the end of the 1980s, the competition was no longer viable and closed. In 1974 and 1975, a British government Central Office of Information film called Pattern of People, designed to promote British industry, was set at the Circuit des Pyrénées.
