= Ouzoum =

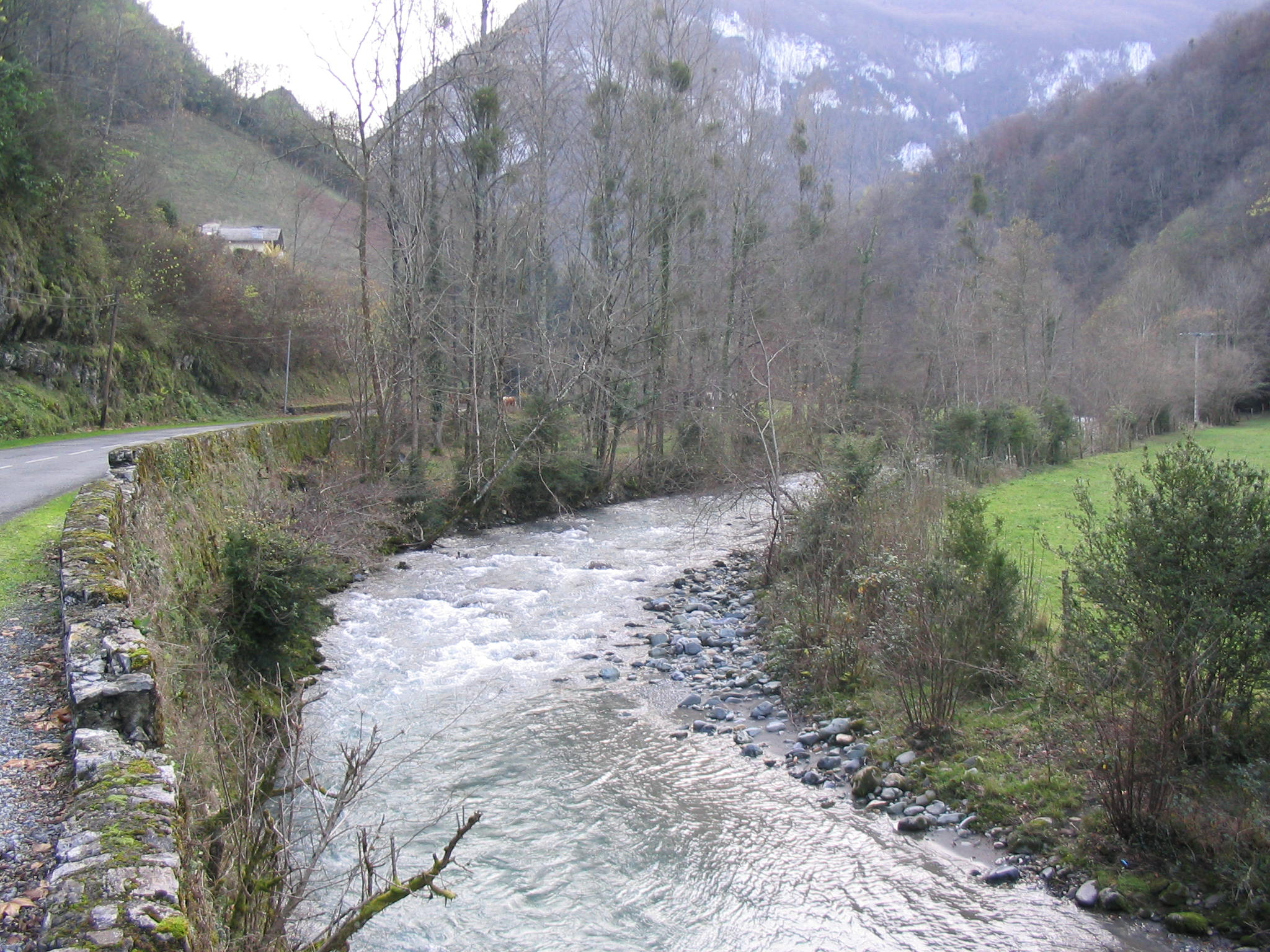

- Location within France Location within Nouvelle-Aquitaine

Location
- Country: France

Physical characteristics
- Source
  - location: Litor Circus
  - coordinates: 42°57′42″N 0°17′23″W
  - elevation: 1,131 m (3,711 ft)
- Mouth
  - location: Gave de Pau
  - coordinates: 43°10′14″N 0°14′50″W
- Length: 33 km (21 mi)
- Basin size: 163 km^{2} (63 mi^{2})
- Discharge
  - average: 6.85 m^{3}/s (242 cu ft/s)

Basin features
- Progression: Gave de Pau→ Gaves réunis→ Adour→ Atlantic Ocean

The Ouzoum (French pronunciation: [uzum]) or Ouzom (French pronunciation: [uzɔm]) is a left tributary of the Gave de Pau, in the Southwest of France, between the Génie longue and the Béez. It is 33.3 km (20.7 mi) long.

It flows into the Gave in Nay, upstream from Pau.

== Name ==
Historical graphies were oscillating between the voiced -s- and the unvoiced -ss-: Oson (1441), Osom, Osson, Ozon (1538), le Lozon (1581), l'Ouson (1585).

This name could be related with the Pyrenean hydronym Ousse.

== Geography ==
The valley of the Ouzoum is separated in two distinct parts by a 9-kilometre (6 mi) long narrow pass. The villages in the upper part of the valley (Arbéost and Ferrières) belong to the Hautes-Pyrénées and have relationships with the Val d'Azun, on the other side of the mountain. On the other hand, the lower part of the valley, close to Pau, is Béarnese (Pyrénées-Atlantiques).

The Ouzoum rises at Cap d’Ouzom ("head of Ouzom") at 1,131 metres (3,711 ft) above sea level in the Litor Circus dominated by the Grand Gabizos at 2,692 metres (8,832 ft). This circus is in relation with the Val d'Azun through the Col du Soulor at 1,474 metres (4,836 ft) and with the Ossau Valley through the Aubisque Pass at 1,709 metres (5,607 ft).

After the basin of Ferrières, the Ouzoum flows through a narrow pass bordered by steep limestone slopes. The valley widens after Arthez-d'Asson.

Its hydrographic regime is pluvio-nival.

== Départements and towns ==
- Hautes-Pyrénées: Arbéost, Ferrières
- Pyrénées-Atlantiques: Asson, Arthez-d'Asson, Igon, Nay.
