= Lorieux =

Lorieux is a French surname. Notable people with the surname include:

- Alain Lorieux (born 1956), French rugby union player
- Auguste Lorieux (1796–1842), French writer
