= Col du Soulor =

Mountain pass in the French Pyrenees

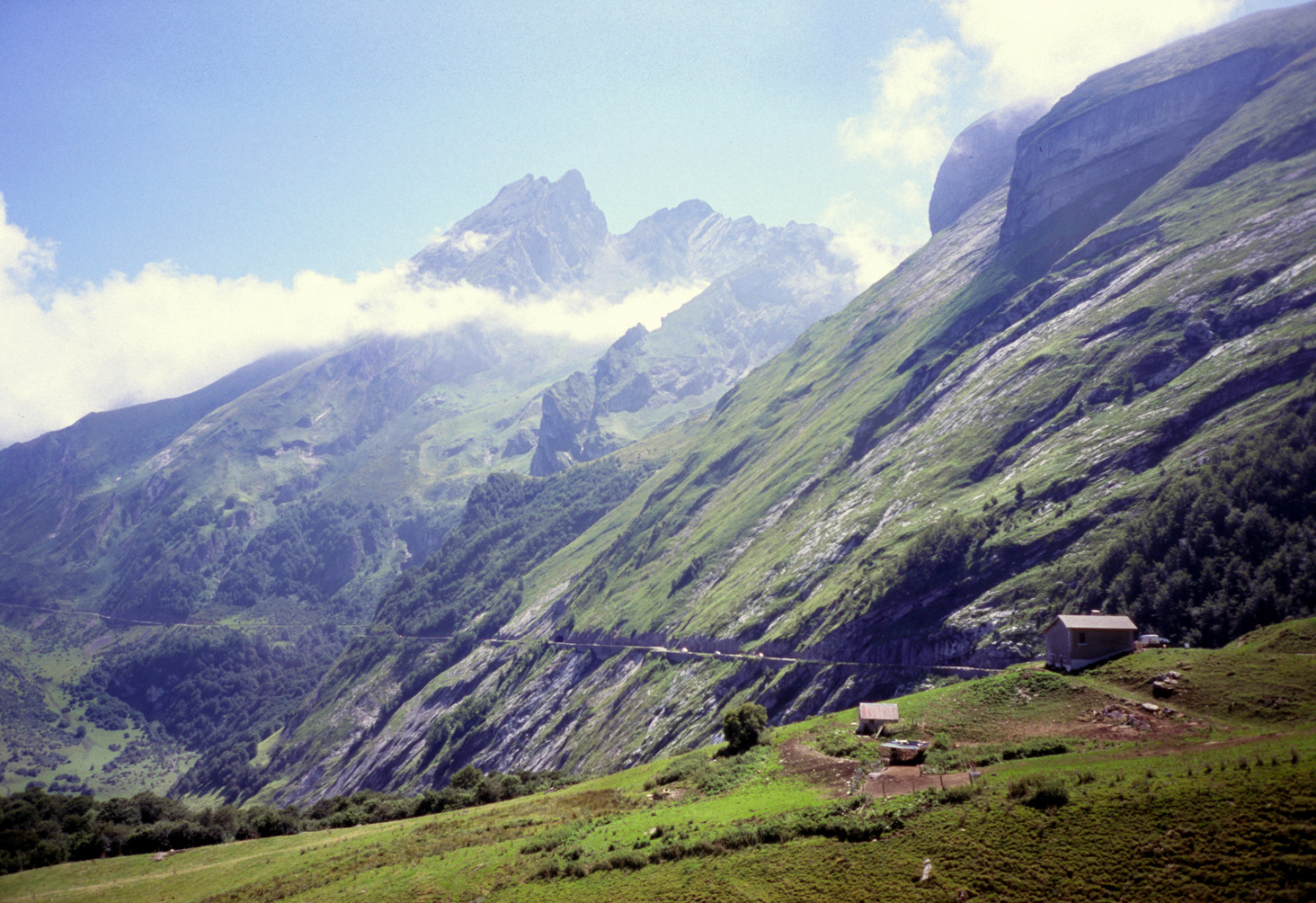
- Road from Col d'Aubisque to Col du Soulor.

- Location within Pyrenees Location within France
- Elevation: 1,474 m (4,836 ft)

Third Approach
- Location: Pyrénées-Atlantiques, France; Hautes-Pyrénées, France
- Range: Pyrenees
- Coordinates: 42°57′38″N 0°15′40″W

Col du Soulor (elevation 1,474 m (4,836 ft)) is a mountain pass in the Pyrenees in France, linking Argelès-Gazost with Arthez-d'Asson. It connects the Ouzom and Arens valleys. A road leaves the pass to the west to reach the higher Col d'Aubisque.

The road over the col is regularly used in the Tour de France cycling race, normally in conjunction with the Col d'Aubisque.

== Details of the climbs ==
Starting from Argelès-Gazost (east), the Soulor is 19.5 km (12.1 mi). It rises 1,019 m (3,343 ft), an average gradient of 5.2%. It gets tough after Arrens-Marsous with stretches at 10% or steeper.

The col can also be reached from the north, via the D126. Starting from Arthez-d'Asson, the ascent is 22 km (14 mi) long. Over this distance, the climb gains 1,074 m (3,524 ft), at an average of 4.9%. The real climbing, however, comes at Ferrières, after which the gradient increases to 9%. This was the direction used in the 2010 Tour de France.

== Tour de France ==
The Col du Soulor was first used in the 1910 Tour de France and was most recently featured in the 12th stage of the 2025 Tour de France, as a category 1 climb.

The Col du Soulor is also crossed during the passage over the Col d'Aubisque. When this route is used, for example in stage 16 of the 2012 Tour de France, it is often not a categorized climb, since the amount of re-ascent from the west is relatively small. It has, however, been a categorized climb on 14 occasions, including in 1982 as a hors catégorie climb.

=== Passages in the Tour de France (since 1947) ===
The categorized crossings of the Col du Soulor since 1947 were as follows:

Year	Stage	Category	Start	Finish	Leader at the summit
2025	12	1	Auch	Hautacam	Michael Woods (CAN)
2019	14	1	Tarbes	Col du Tourmalet	Tim Wellens (BEL)
2010	17	1	Pau	Col du Tourmalet	Marcus Burghardt (GER)
2000	10	2	Dax	Hautacam	Javier Otxoa (ESP)
1999	16	1	Lannemezan	Pau	Pavel Tonkov (RUS)
1997	9	1	Pau	Loudenvielle	Laurent Brochard (FRA)
1996	17	1	Argelès-Gazost	Pamplona	Pascal Hervé (FRA)
1995	16	1	Tarbes	Pau	Stage neutralised
1985	18b	4	Laruns	Pau	Álvaro Pino (ESP)
1985	18a	1	Luz-Saint-Sauveur	Col d'Aubisque	Stephen Roche (IRL)
1982	12	HC	Fleurance	Pau	André Chalmel (FRA)
1979	3	1	Bagnères-de-Luchon	Pau	Mariano Martinez (FRA)
1975	10	1	Auch	Pau	Lucien Van Impe (BEL)
1974	18	1	Bagnères-de-Bigorre	Pau	Andrés Oliva (ESP)
1973	14	1	Bagnères-de-Luchon	Pau	Pedro Torres (ESP)

== See also ==
- Souvenir Henri Desgrange
