= Auguste Lorieux =

French writer

- Born: 14 December 1796; Le Croisic
- Died: 27 July 1842 (aged 45); Eaux-Bonnes
- Writing career
- Language: French

Auguste Julien Marie Lorieux (14 December 1796 – 27 July 1842) was a 19th-century French writer and jurisdiction consultant.

== Biography ==
Auguste was the son of Bonaventure Ambroise Lorieux, lord of Mainguisserie, representative of Saint-Nazaire and member of the Guérande in 1790, and Julienne David de Drézigué, daughter of Le Croisic’s mayor, René David de Drézigué, deputy at the Estates of Brittany. Because he was a royalist, republicans shut him in 1793. His brother, Théodore Marie Clair Lorieux was a general inspector at the corps des mines and the Mines of Paris.

He was born on 14 December 1796 or 1797 in Corsica. After finishing his studies at Nantes with the best results, he learnt law at Rennes. He was nominated to procurer of the king in 1823. following the July Revolution, he regained the magistrate at the king. He was nominated as an advocate at the office in Nantes. Lorieux returned to the magistrate in 1837.

Lorieux was a member of the Société académique de Nantes et de Loire-Atlantique.

== Works ==
- 1824: Le Spectre barbier, tale imitated from English
- 1826: Les Humoristes, ou le Château de Bracebridge, by Washington Irving, translated from English by Gustave Grandpré... (under the pseudonym Gustave Grandpré)
- 1828: Promenade au Croisic : suivie d'Iseul et Almanzor, ou la Grotte à Madame: poem (under the pen name Gustave Grandpré)
- 1828: Promenade au Croisic : Pays nantais, presqu'île guérandaise, Brière (under the pen name Gustave Grandpré, 2010)
- 1833: Précis historiques des événemens de l'année 1832. Par un ancien magistrat
- 1834: Histoire du régne et de la chute de Charles X: précédée de considérations générales sur les révolutions comparées de France et d'Angleterre en 1688 et 1830
- 1836: Avis aux propriétaires. Des droits de l'administration sur les arbres plantés le long des grandes routes
- 1836: Du Pavage dans les villes : examen de la question de savoir si l'établissement et l'entretien du pavé dans les villes est une dépense communale ou s'il doit demeurer à la charge des particuliers ?
- 1836: Le nouvel anacharsis français ou promenades dans diverses contrées de la France: suivi d'une histoire agrégée de l'abbaye de la Trappe (under the pen name Gustave Grandpré
- 1838: Des votes négatifs en matière d'élection
- 1840: Traité de la prérogative royale en France et en Angleterre: suivi d'un essai sur le pouvoir des rois à Lacédémone (2 volumes)
- 1840: Mémoire sur les sels
- 1840: Des corps représentatifs du commerce à Nantes
- 1840: Du Partage des landes en Bretagne ...
- 1840: Excursion dans les Pyrénées
- Exposé des institutions politiques, judiciaires, administratives et financières de l'Angleterre

== Sources ==
- Louis Gabriel Michaud, "Biographie universelle, ancienne et moderne", 1843
- François-Xavier de Feller, "Biographie universelle ou Dictionnaire historique des hommes qui se sont fait un nom par leur génie, leurs talents, leurs erreurs ou leurs crimes", 1850
- Jean-Loup Avril, "1000 Bretons: Dictionnaire biographique", 2002
- Prosper Jean Levot, "Biographie bretonne, Volume 2", 1857
- Edmond-Denis De Manne, "Nouveau dictionnaire des ouvrages anonymes et pseudonymes", 1868
