= Eaux-Bonnes =

- Commune
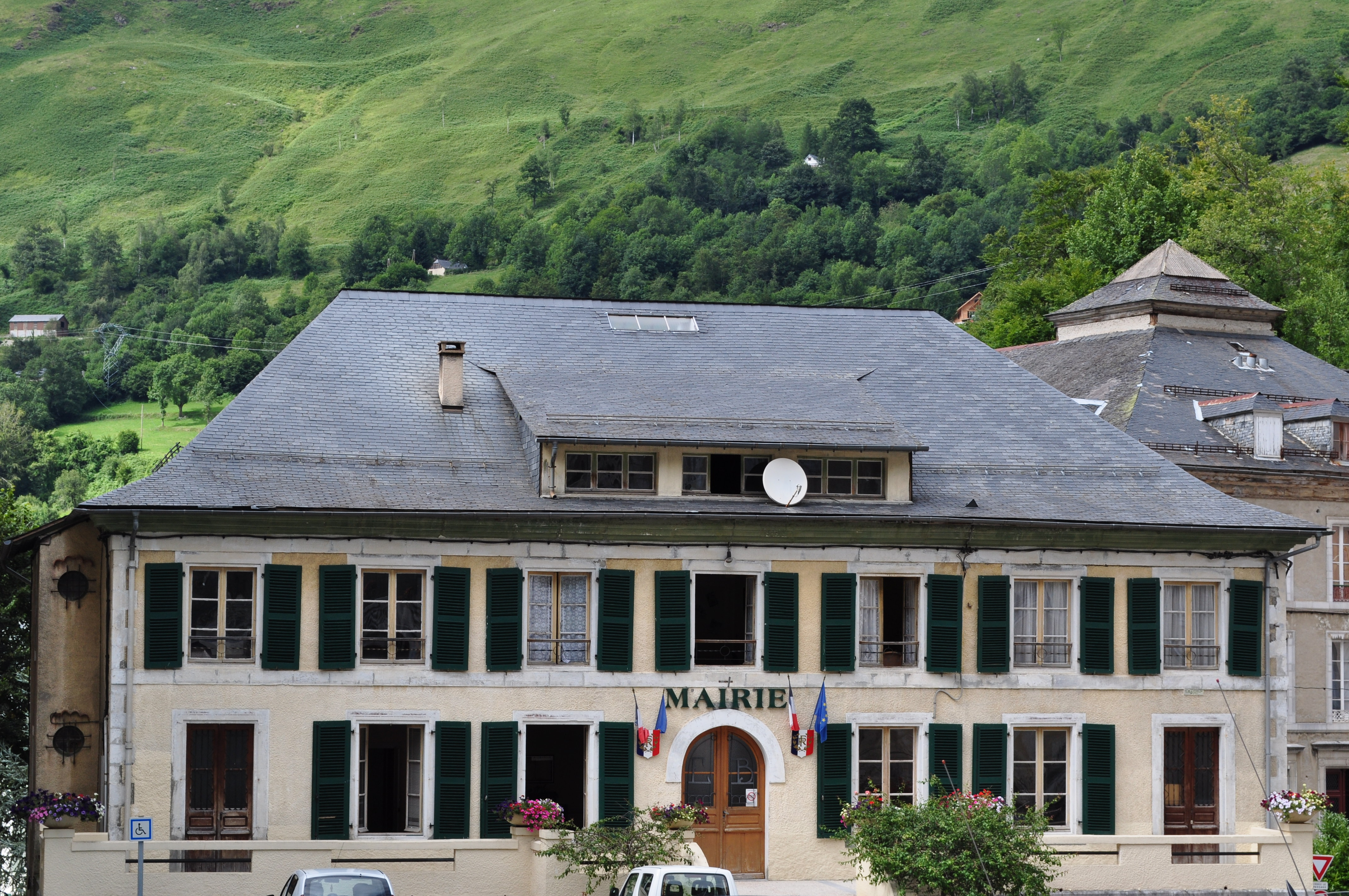
- Town Hall

- Coat of arms
- Location of Eaux-Bonnes
- Location within France Location within Nouvelle-Aquitaine
- Coordinates: 42°58′26″N 0°23′27″W
- Country: France
- Region: Nouvelle-Aquitaine
- Department: Pyrénées-Atlantiques
- Arrondissement: Oloron-Sainte-Marie
- Canton: Oloron-Sainte-Marie-2
- Intercommunality: Vallée d'Ossau

Government
  - Mayor (2020–2026): Jean-Luc Braud
- Area^{1}: 38.52 km^{2} (14.87 sq mi)
- Elevation: 750 m (2,460 ft)
- Highest elevation: 2,619 m (8,593 ft)
- Lowest elevation: 520 m (1,710 ft)
- Population (2023): 215
  - Density: 5.58/km^{2} (14.5/sq mi)
- Demonym(s): Eaux-Bonnais, Eaux-Bonnaises
- Time zone: UTC+01:00 (CET)
  - Summer (DST): UTC+02:00 (CEST)
- INSEE/Postal code: 64204 /64440
- ^{1} French Land Register data, which excludes lakes, ponds, glaciers > 1 km^{2} (0.386 sq mi or 247 acres) and river estuaries.

Eaux-Bonnes (French: [o bɔn], "good waters"; Occitan: Aigas Bonas) is a commune in the Pyrénées-Atlantiques department in south-western France.

== Description ==
Eaux-Bonnes is close to the small town of Laruns. It is situated at a height of 2,460 feet (750 m) at the entrance of a fine gorge, overlooking the confluence of two rivers. The village's waters were first documented in the middle of the 14th century. The Eaux-Chaudes spa is 5 miles (8.0 km) south-west of Eaux-Bonnes, and there is fine mountain scenery in the neighbourhood of both places, the Pic de Ger near Eaux-Bonnes.

The climate which characterizes the town is of "mountain climate", according to the typology of climates of France which then has eight major types of climates in metropolitan France.

Gourette is a winter sports resort located in the commune on the high mountain pass Col d'Aubisque.

== History ==
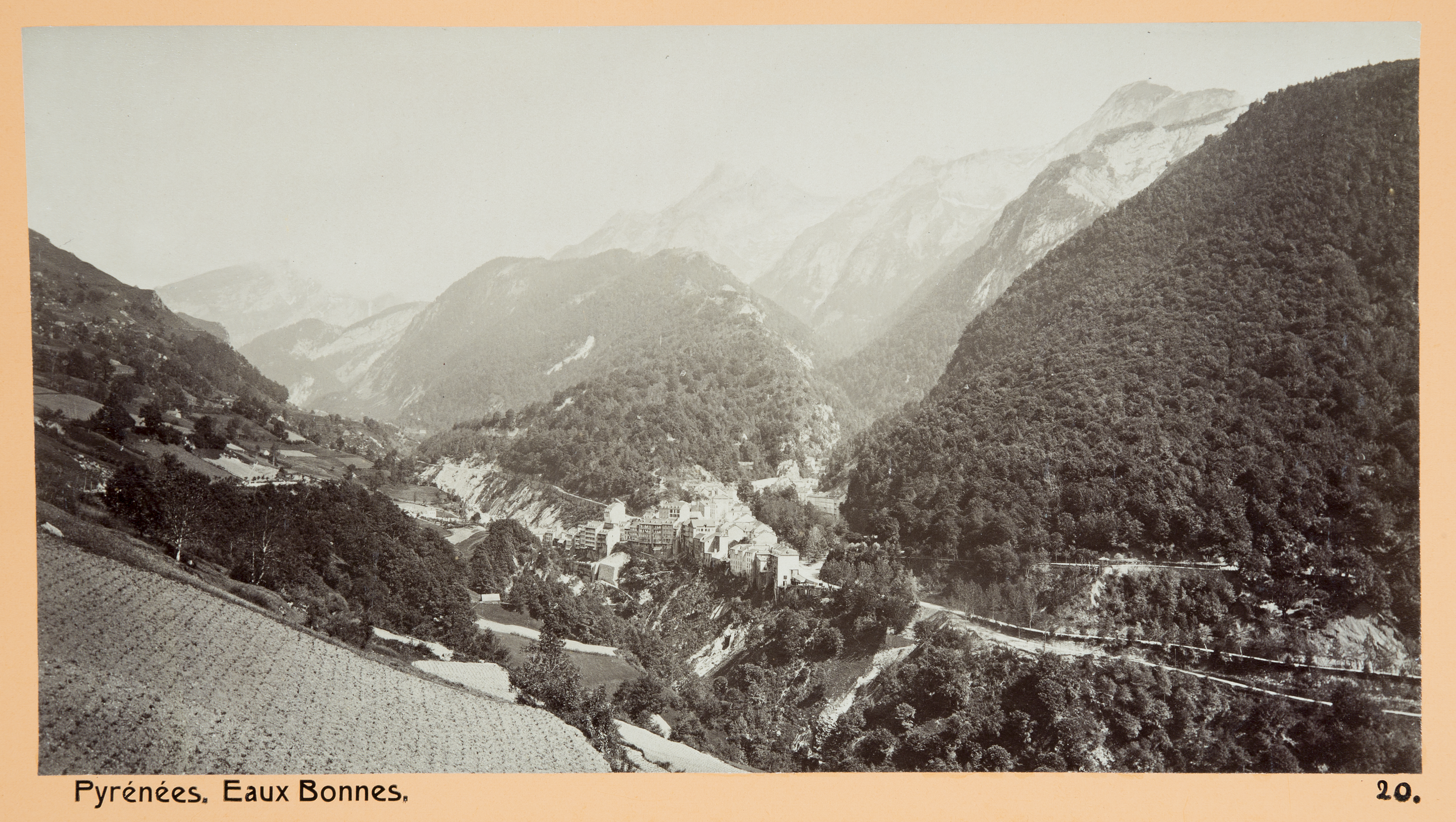
Eaux-Bonnes circa 1886

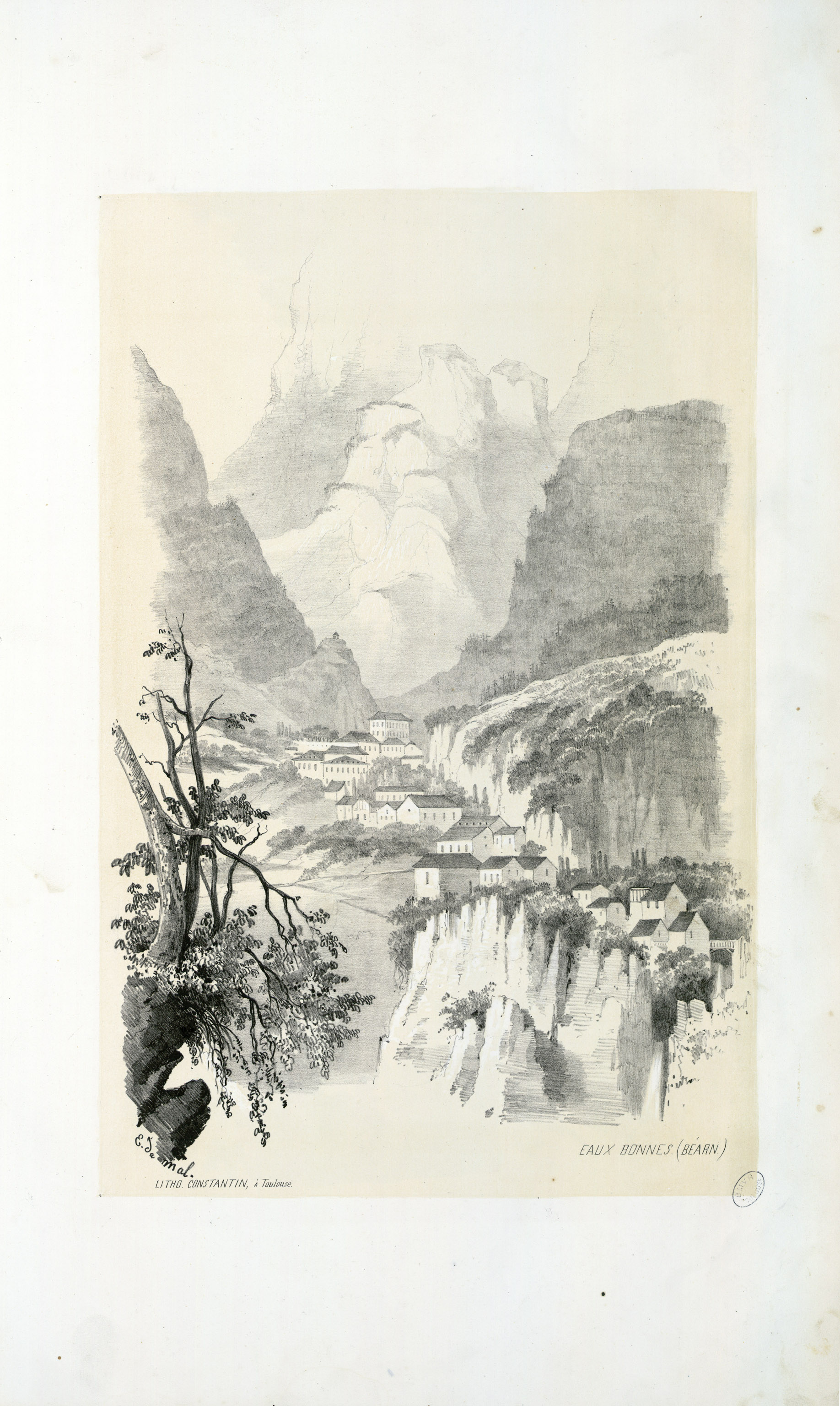
Eaux-Bonnes in 1843, by Eugène de Malbos.

The historian Auguste Lorieux (1796–1842) died in Eaux-Bonnes.

Nearby to the north-west on the Surcou road, is the impressive villa Cockade, the construction of which is detailed in Dornford Yates's novel The House That Berry Built.

== Population ==
Historical population

Year	Pop.	±% p.a.
1793	206	—
1821	259	+0.82%
1846	477	+2.47%
1872	836	+2.18%
1901	768	−0.29%
1926	455	−2.07%
1946	510	+0.57%
1962	392	−1.63%
1968	501	+4.17%

Year	Pop.	±% p.a.
1975	421	−2.45%
1982	526	+3.23%
1990	536	+0.24%
1999	435	−2.29%
2007	425	−0.29%
2012	366	−2.94%
2017	243	−7.86%
2023	215	−2.02%

Source: EHESS (1793-1999) and INSEE

== See also ==
- Aas, a village in Eaux-Bonnes.
- Ossau Valley
- Communes of the Pyrénées-Atlantiques department
