= Aas, Pyrénées-Atlantiques =

Human settlement in France

Coordinates: 42°59′N 0°24′W

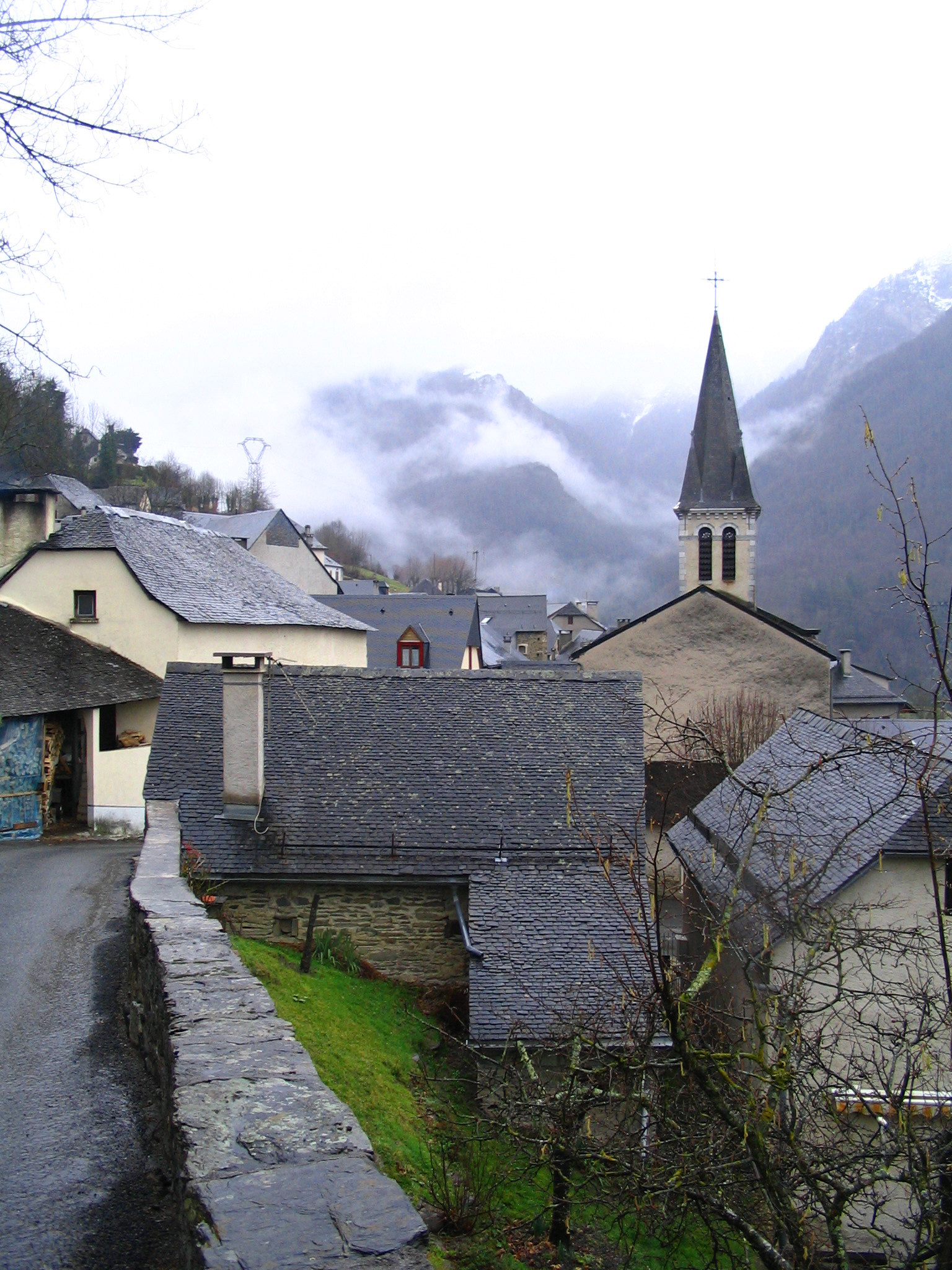

Aas (Occitan: Aas) is a French village of about a hundred inhabitants in the commune of Eaux-Bonnes, Ossau valley, historical province of Haut-Béarn, departement Pyrénées-Atlantiques.

Its shepherds maintained a whistled language until the 20th century. According to Graham Robb, no outsiders knew of the language until a 1959 TV program mentioned it. Whistles were up to 100 decibels, and were used for communication by shepherds in the mountains and by women working in the fields. During the Nazi occupation of World War II, the language was used to ferry refugees across the Spanish borders.
