= Whistled language of Aas =

Whistled speech variation of Occitan, practiced in the Aas village, France

- siular d'Aas
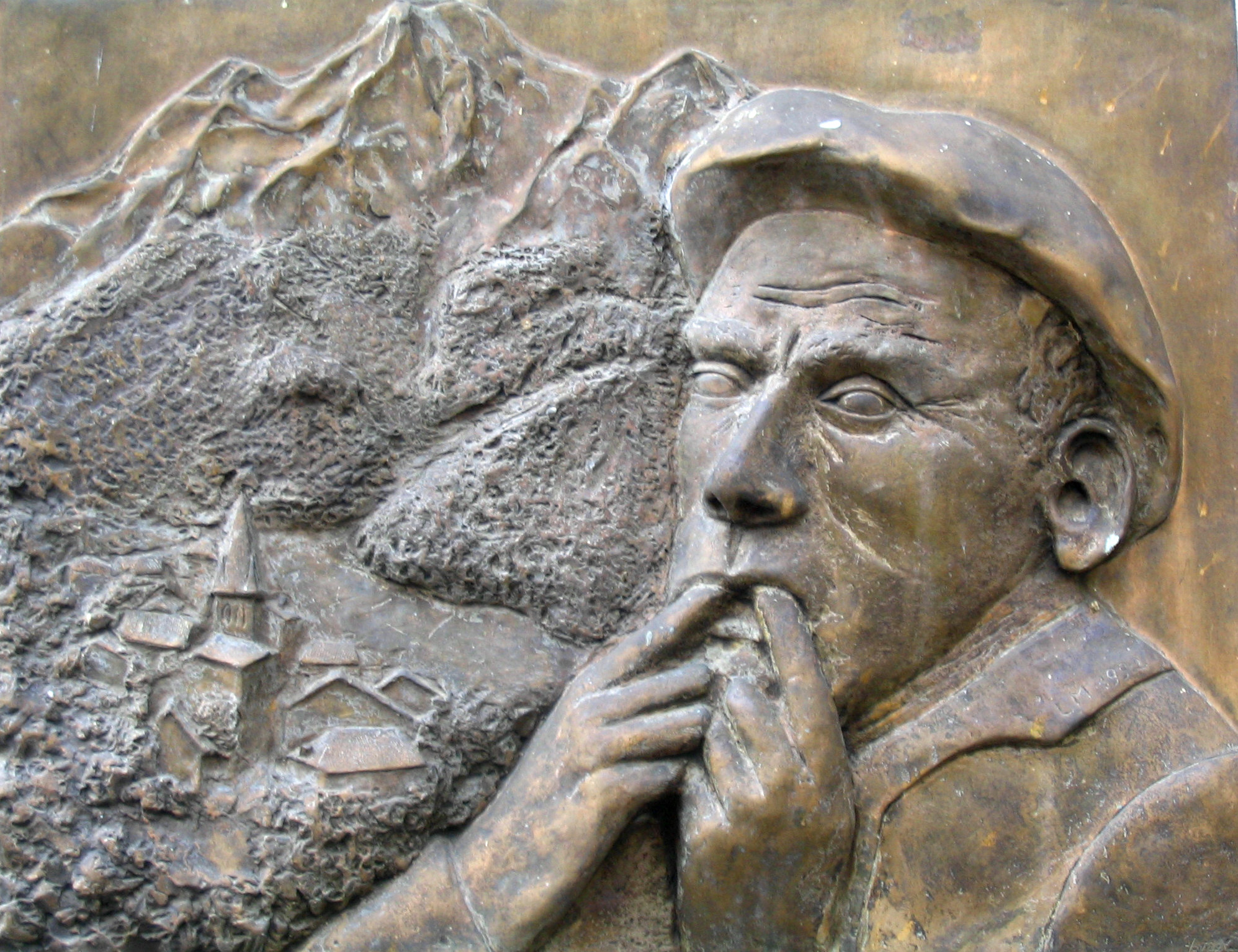
- Plaque on the church in Aas illustrating a person whistling
- Native to: France
- Region: Aas, Pyrénées-Atlantiques
- Extinct: 1999, with the death of Anne Pallas
- Revival: >10 revivalists
- Language family: Indo-European: Italic; Latino-Faliscan; Romance; Italo-Western; Western; Gallo-Romance; Occitano-Romance; Occitan; Gascon; Béarnese; Whistled language of Aas

Language codes
- ISO 639-3: –
- Glottolog: None
- Coordinates: 42°59′N 0°24′W

The whistled language of Aas (in French: langage sifflé d'Aas, occitan sifflé d'Aas; in Occitan: siular d'Aas) is a whistled language used in the Pyrennees village of Aas, located in the Béarn area of southern France. Local pastoral activities and shepherds benefited from long distant communication allowed by whistled and the mountainous topography. Whistled Occitan is based on the local Béarnese dialect of Gascon, itself often regarded as a dialect of Occitan. According to Philippe Biu, it is "a practice known as the whistled language of Aas, but above all it is a technique [allowing] speech to be transposed as whistling".

== History ==
The use of the language was first documented in the 15th century.

The local topography, notably including deep valleys, allows for quality sound transmission, with a usable range of over 2 kilometres (1.2 miles). The inhabitants of the area therefore began using a whistled transposition of the Gascon dialect of the Occitan language as a means of communicating between the pastures and the village, or from one part of a valley to another.

The language was transmitted from generation to generation, however, rural flight and the adoption of new communication techniques caused this transmission to cease.

After being informed of the practice, René-Guy Busnel, acoustician and directeur d'études (university educator) at the École pratique des hautes études, documented the whistled language in 1950. The natural use of the language in the Ossau Valley ceased toward the end of the 20th century as the agricultural lifestyle disappeared along with the passing of the final remaining goatherds who used the language. Anne Pallas, the last historical user of the language, died in 1999.

== Revitalisation ==
The cultural heritage status of the language and regrets over its disappearance brought several local Béarnese language activists to contribute to revitalisation efforts. Participants travelled to La Gomera in the Canary Islands to learn from 'master whistlers' of Silbo Gomero. An association titled Lo siular d'Aas, led by Philippe Biu and containing over ten members, is working to revive the language. The University of Pau and the Adour Region (UPPA) offers a class taught by Philippe Biu. The Lo siular d'Aas association, the regional council, the UPPA and the middle school (collège) in Laruns support the preservation of the language with bilingual classes taught in French and Occitan.

== Documentation ==
Research projects and a digital content repository have been discussed.

Example audio file
'Aas' being whistled in the language

In 2024, audio recordings of the language were released for the first time in open access and under a free license through a collaboration between the University of Toulouse and Wikimedia projects, notably the Lingua Libre project run by Wikimedia France. In the same year, a temporary exhibition titled Siffler le gascon, histoire d'une renaissance (Whistling Gascon, history of a renaissance) took place at Anglet. An interactive map created for the exhibition allowed guests to explore the Occitan area and hear the names of villages in the whistled language.

== Phonology ==
The language is articulated around four vowels (i, e, à, o) and four consonants (ke, ye, che, ge).
