= Pic de Ger =

French summit in the Atlantic Pyrenees

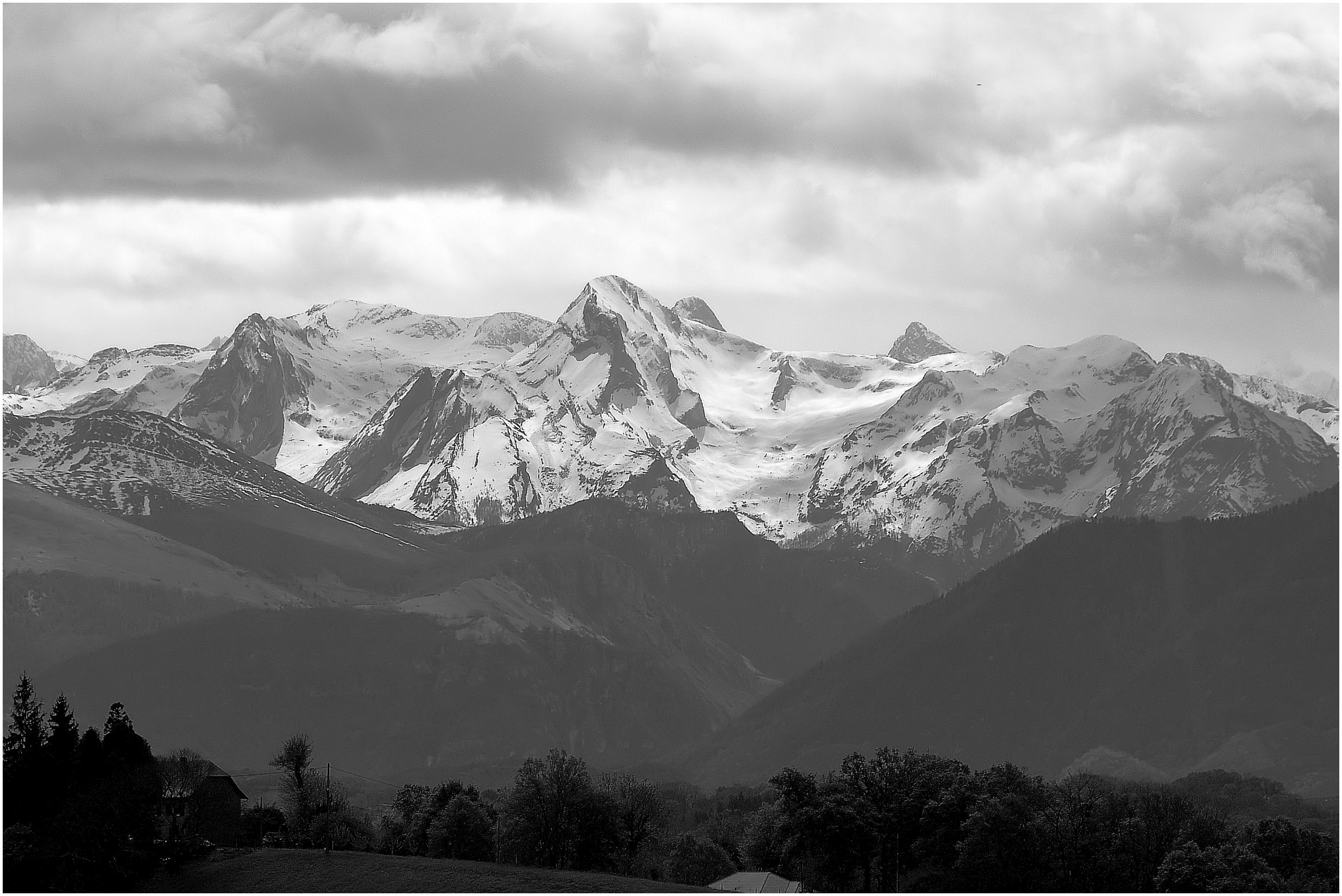
- Vue depuis les coteaux de Cuqueron

Highest point
- Elevation: 2,613 m (8,573 ft)
- Coordinates: 42°56′12″N 0°21′15″E

Geography
- Location within Pyrenees
- Location: Pyrénées-Atlantiques, Aquitaine, France
- Parent range: Pyrénées

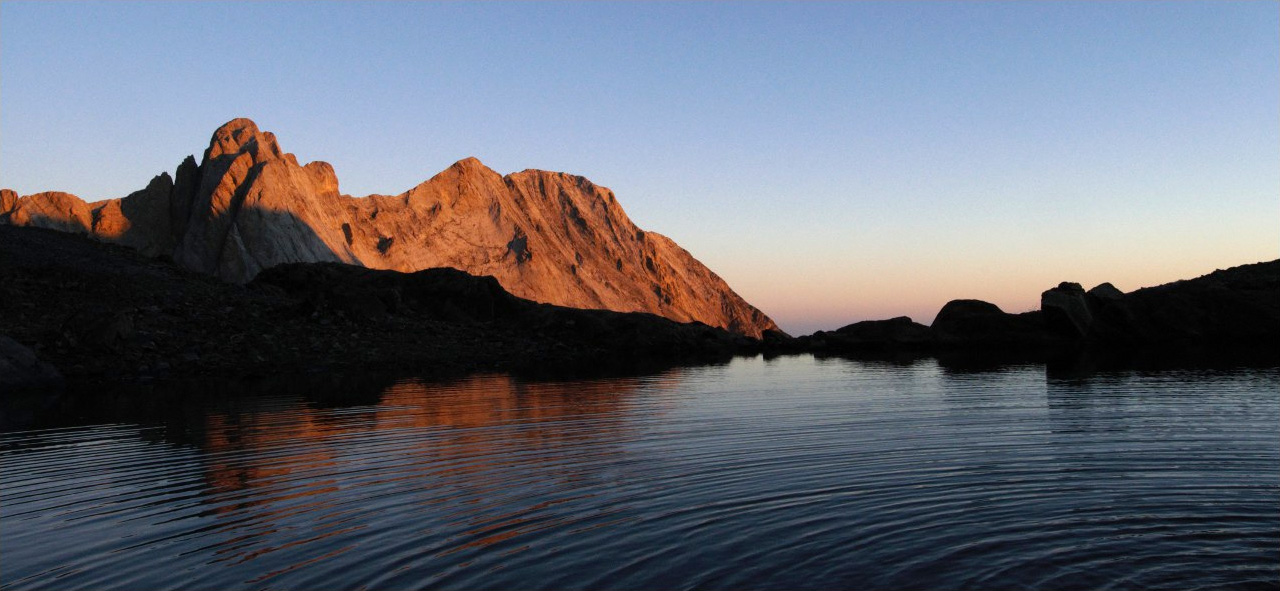
Reflet du Ger dans Cinda-Blanque

The Pic de Ger is a French Pyrenean summit, culminating at 2,613 m (8,573 ft), located in the Ossau Valley in the Béarn province.

== Toponymy ==
The name ger means "mountain meadows" in Gascon.

== Topography ==
It lies between the Col d'Aubisque and the Pic du Midi d'Ossau.

== Access ==
From Laruns, or further up from Eaux-Bonnes or Gourette.

== Legend of Clara "la Dame au Châle" ==
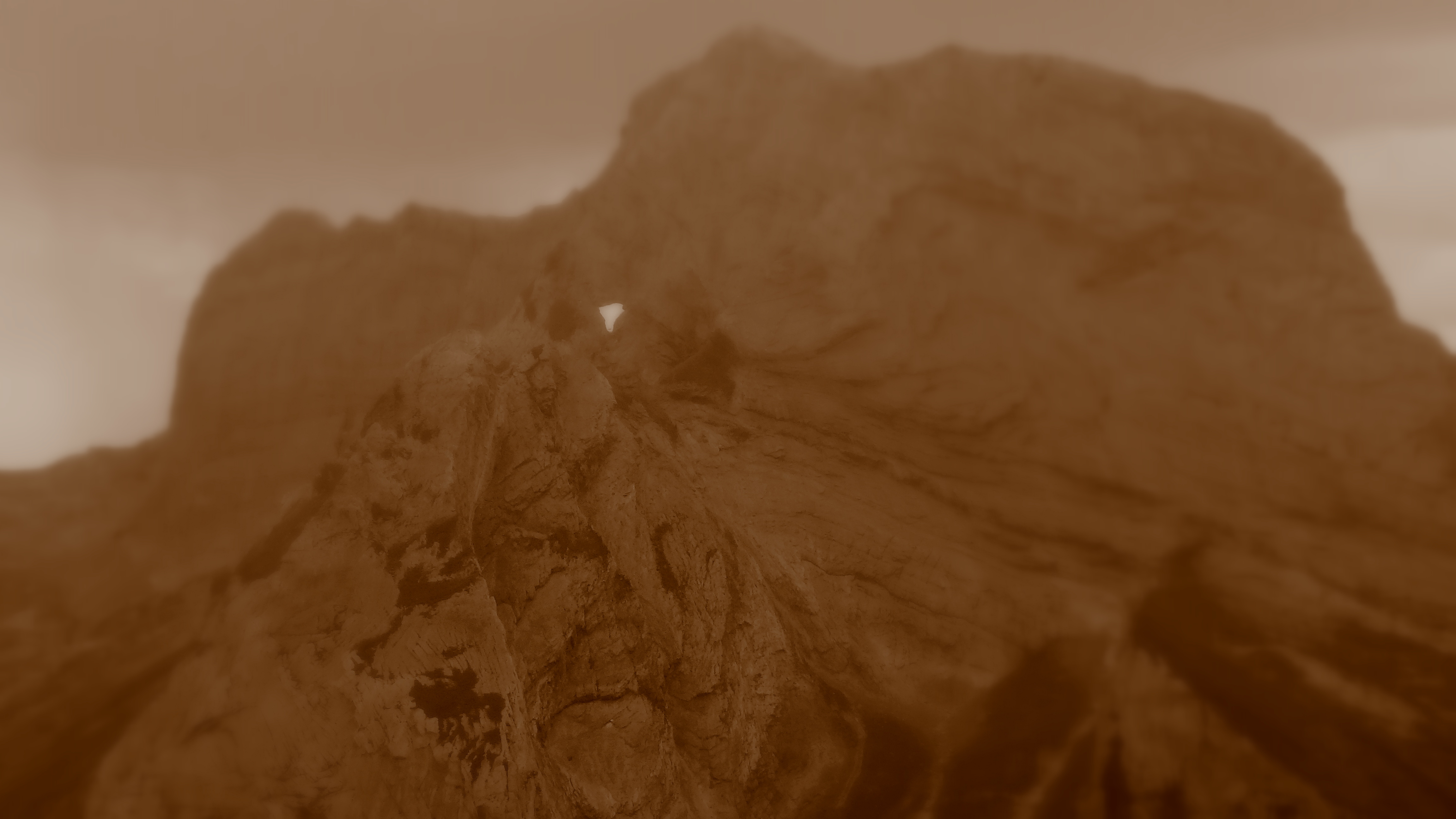
Pic de Ger and la dame au châle

It is told in the Ger and in the Col d'Aubisque, that a very old woman named Clara was taken by surprise above 2,000 m (6,600 ft) by the cold and snowy weather, only wearing a thick shawl with a walking stick. She was surprised by a bear, also in despair. Awestruck, she threw the baton so hard that it pierced the Pic de Ger at around 2,500 m (8,200 ft) high. The frightened bear fled. This moment of local history, surely inspired by an unsourced true tale, is still carved in the rock. In fact, under the summit of the Pic de Ger, the hole still exists, while at the bottom the face of the woman with her shawl and chapped lips.
