= Arthez-d'Asson =

- Commune
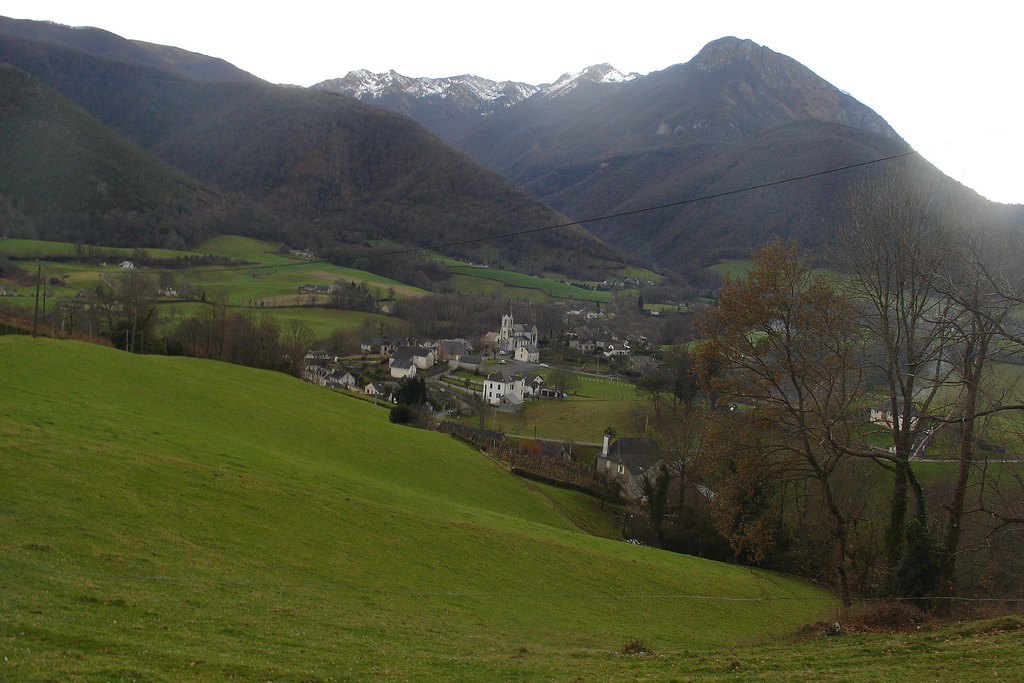
- The Village
- Location of Arthez-d'Asson
- Location within France Location within Nouvelle-Aquitaine
- Coordinates: 43°05′27″N 0°15′03″W
- Country: France
- Region: Nouvelle-Aquitaine
- Department: Pyrénées-Atlantiques
- Arrondissement: Pau
- Canton: Ouzom, Gave et Rives du Neez
- Intercommunality: CC Pays Nay

Government
  - Mayor (2020–2026): Jean-Jacques Laffitte
- Area^{1}: 7.32 km^{2} (2.83 sq mi)
- Elevation: 568 m (1,864 ft)
- Highest elevation: 494 m (1,621 ft)
- Lowest elevation: 329 m (1,079 ft)
- Population (2023): 457
  - Density: 62.4/km^{2} (162/sq mi)
- Time zone: UTC+01:00 (CET)
  - Summer (DST): UTC+02:00 (CEST)
- INSEE/Postal code: 64058 /64800
- ^{1} French Land Register data, which excludes lakes, ponds, glaciers > 1 km^{2} (0.386 sq mi or 247 acres) and river estuaries.

Arthez-d'Asson (French pronunciation: [aʁtɛz dasɔ̃], literally Arthez of Asson; Occitan: Artés d'Asson) is a commune in the Pyrénées-Atlantiques department in the Nouvelle-Aquitaine region of south-western France.

== Geography ==
Arthez-d'Asson is in the Ouzom Valley some 30 km south by south-east of Pau and 35 km east by south-east of Oloron-Sainte-Marie. The commune is almost entirely surrounded by the commune of Asson. Access to the commune is by road D126 which comes from Asson in the north passing through the commune and the village, continuing south up the Valley to Ferrières. The commune is almost entirely farmland although with patches of forest particularly along the river.

The Ouzom River flows through the length of the commune from south to north gathering some tributaries on the right bank, such as the Cau du Hau, the Cau du Gat, the Arriou Sec, and the Cau de la Heche, and continuing north to join the Gave de Pau near Coarraze.The Ruisseau de Thouet forms the north-western border of the commune as it flows north-east to join the Ouzom.

=== Places and Hamlets ===
- Les Aoules
- Arbes
- Arrascles dessus
- Arrecgros
- Arrecous
- Arribarrouy
- Boué
- Canet
- La Cantine
- Chartou
- Chourettes
- Chourrist
- Pé de la Coumette
- Garrenot
- Guilhamet
- Guilhem
- Habout
- Clot du Hour
- Hourna
- Jacob
- Labède
- Lacoue
- Lanot
- Larrabe
- Maupas
- Le Pont du Moulin
- Panan
- Peyré
- La Pine
- Cot de Tisnès
- Tort
- Turounet

== Toponymy ==
The commune name in béarnais is Artés d'Asson. Michel Grosclaude indicated that the name Arthez possibly came from the mediterranean radical arte ("green oak" then "undergrowth"), with the collective basque suffix -etz. He proposed it in the sense of "Vegetation of the undergrowth".

The following table details the origins of the commune name and other names in the commune.

Name	Spelling	Date	Source	Page	Origin	Description
Asson	Assoo	11th century	Raymond	15	Saint-Pé	Village
	Assonium	1100	Raymond	15	Titles of Mifaget	
	Villa quœe vocatur Asso	12th century	Raymond	15	Lescar	
	Assun	13th century	Raymond	15	Fors de Béarn	
	La vegarie d'Asson	1450	Raymond	15	Cour Major	
	Saint Paul d'Asson	1750	Cassini			
	Saint-Martin d'Asson	1790	Raymond	15		
Balirot	Balirot	1863	Raymond	20		Hamlet
Le Bourdalat	Le Bourdalat	1863	Raymond	35		Hamlet
Garrenot	Garrenot	1863	Raymond	67		Hamlet

Sources:

- Raymond: Topographic Dictionary of the Department of Basses-Pyrenees, 1863, on the page numbers indicated in the table. (in French)
- Cassini: Cassini Map from 1750

Origins:

- Saint-Pé: Cartulary of the Abbey of Saint-Pé
- Lescar: Cartulary of Lescar
- Fors de Béarn
- Cour Major: Regulations of the Cour Major

== History ==
Paul Raymond noted on page 14 of his 1863 dictionary that the commune was formed in 1749 by the union of the hamlets of Arthez-deçà and Arthez-delà from the commune of Asson.

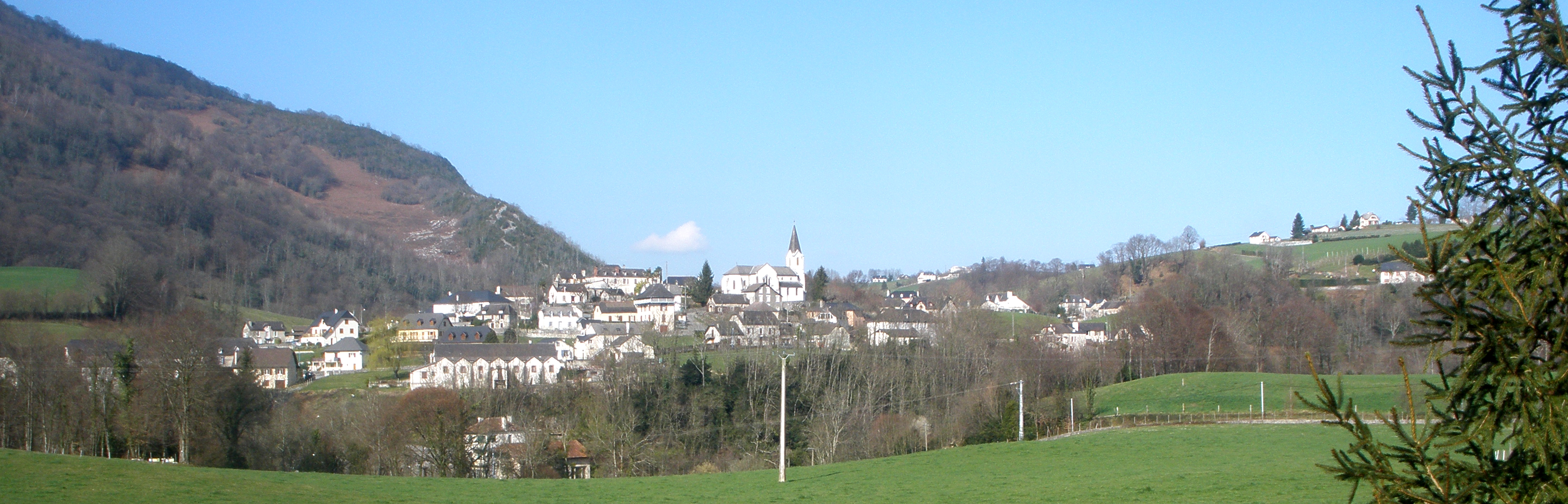
Panoramic view from the right bank of the Ouzom

== Administration ==
List of Successive Mayors

From	To	Name	Party	Position
1802		Charles d'Angosse		Chamberlain of the Emperor
1983	1989	Georges Nabarra		
1995	2008	Michel Dourau		
2008	2026	Jean-Jacques Laffitte		

=== Inter-communality ===
The commune is part of four inter-communal structures:

- the Communauté de communes du Pays de Nay;
- the AEP association of Pays de Nay-Ouest;
- the Energy association of Pyrénées-Atlantiques;
- the inter-communal association for the construction of the CES of Nay;

== Demography ==
The inhabitants of the commune are known as Arthéziens or Arthéziennes in French.

Historical population

Year	Pop.	±% p.a.
1793	1,102	—
1800	977	−1.71%
1806	1,011	+0.57%
1821	1,148	+0.85%
1831	1,372	+1.80%
1836	1,320	−0.77%
1841	1,380	+0.89%
1846	1,313	−0.99%
1851	1,279	−0.52%
1856	1,275	−0.06%
1861	1,220	−0.88%
1866	1,243	+0.37%
1872	1,043	−2.88%
1876	1,075	+0.76%
1881	1,042	−0.62%
1886	1,183	+2.57%
1891	1,137	−0.79%
1896	1,152	+0.26%
1901	1,116	−0.63%

Year	Pop.	±% p.a.
1906	1,162	+0.81%
1911	1,179	+0.29%
1921	893	−2.74%
1926	874	−0.43%
1931	850	−0.56%
1936	785	−1.58%
1946	687	−1.32%
1954	621	−1.25%
1962	581	−0.83%
1968	538	−1.27%
1975	510	−0.76%
1982	478	−0.92%
1990	466	−0.32%
1999	508	+0.96%
2007	502	−0.15%
2012	511	+0.36%
2017	491	−0.80%
2023	457	−1.19%

Source: EHESS and INSEE

== Economy ==
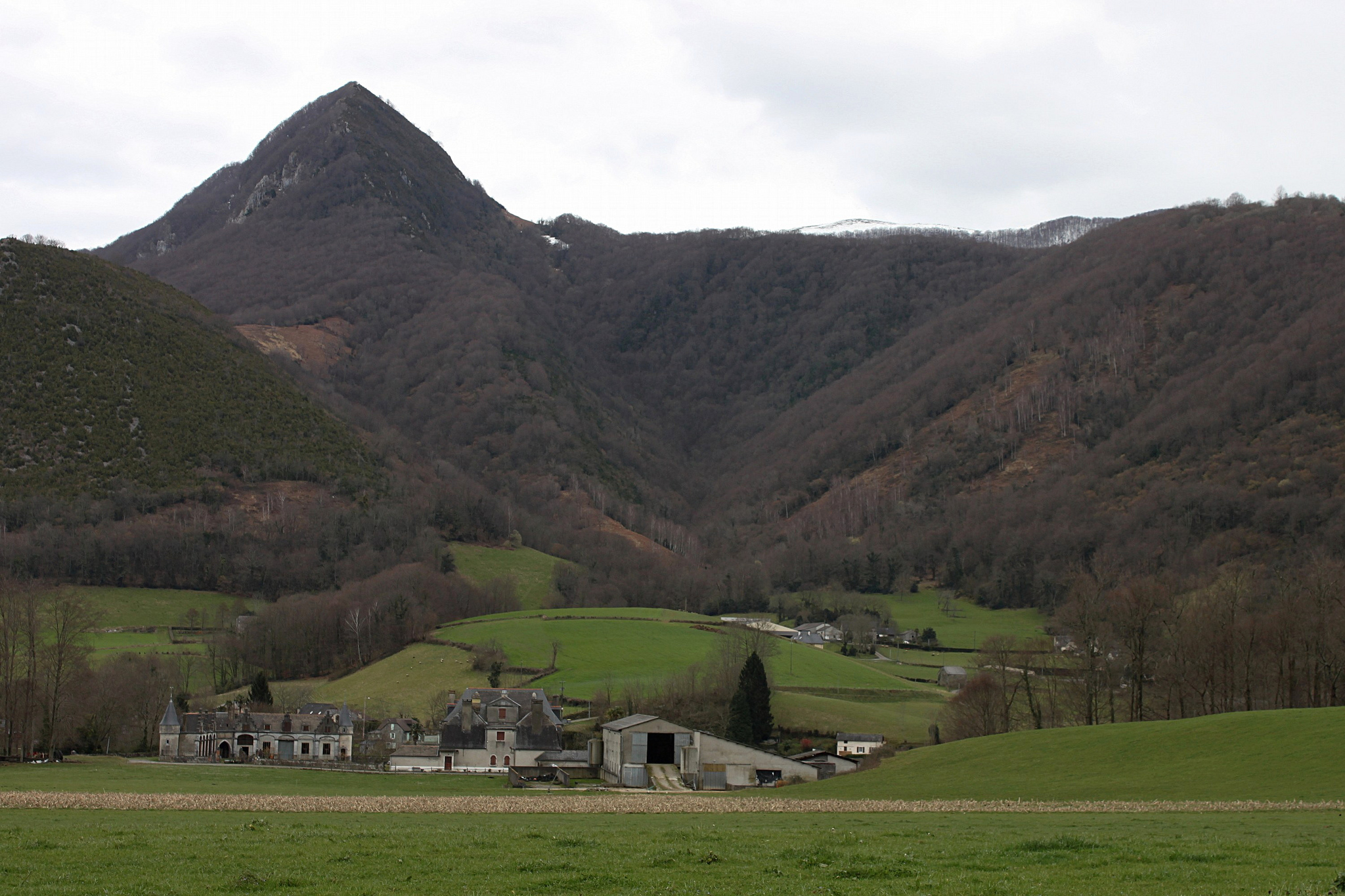
Pasturage at Arthez-d'Asson

The commune is part of the Appellation d'origine contrôlée (AOC) zone of Ossau-iraty.

== Culture and Heritage ==
The béarnais singing group from Arthez-d'Asson Los de l'Ouzom was created during the 1980s.

=== Civil Heritage ===
- There was a railway line in the commune transporting minerals from the Baburet Iron Mine.
- The old Asson Ironworks was built around 1680.

=== Religious heritage ===
The Church of Saint-Paul (1906) is registered as a historical monument.

== Facilities ==
Arthez-d'Asson has a primary school.

== Notable people linked to the commune ==
- Jean-Paul d'Angosse, born in 1732 at Lembeye and died in 1798 at Arthez-d'Asson, was a military man, owner of an ironworks, French politician;
- Armand d'Angosse, born in 1776 at Arthez-d'Asson and died in 1852 at Corbère-Abères, owner of an ironworks, French politician;
- Charles d'Angosse, born in 1774 at Arthez-d'Asson and died in 1835 at Paris, owner of an ironworks, administrator and French politician.
- Jean Espagnolle, born in 1828 at Ferrières and died in 1918 at Arthez-d'Asson, was a churchman, preacher, and an honorary canon;
- Henri Bremond, born in 1865 at Aix-en-Provence and died in 1933 at Arthez-d'Asson, was a churchman, historian, and French literary critic, member of the Académie française.

== See also ==
- Communes of the Pyrénées-Atlantiques department
