= Pyrénées Animal Park =

Zoo in Argelès-Gazost, France

Coordinates: 43.0154°N 0.0977°W

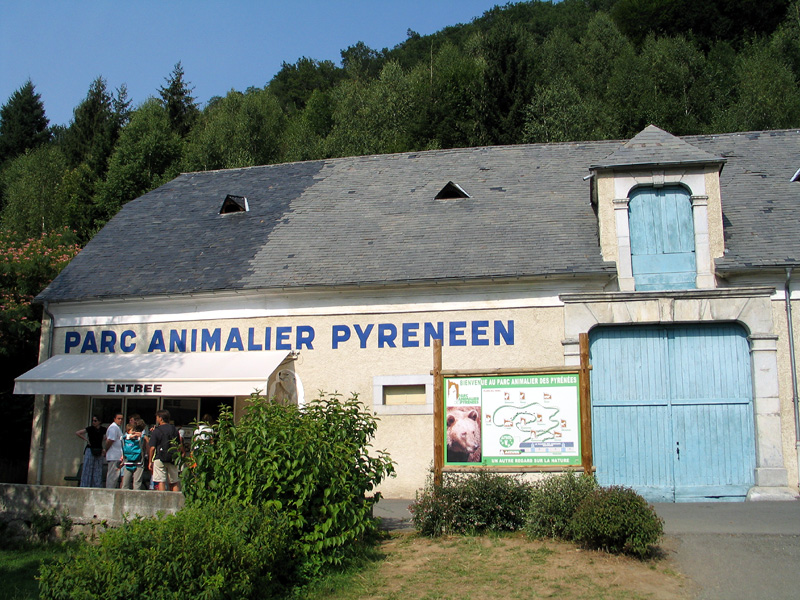
- Interactive map of Pyrénées Animal Park
- Date opened: 1999
- Location: Argelès-Gazost, Hautes-Pyrénées, France

The Pyrénées Animal Park (French: Parc Animalier des Pyrénées), nicknamed The Marmots Hill is located in Argelès-Gazost in the Hautes-Pyrénées, France. It was created in 1999 by Serge Mounard, an individual, on a property operated by his dairy producing family. His idea was to present visitors a number of regional animals in a semi-wild environment. The path, in zigzag in the hills, gave the chance to admire common animals like the squirrel, marmot and otter, but also to approach foxes within a few meters, wolves, ibex, mouflons, isards or brown bears. It was even possible to touch some species, like farm animals (hens, rabbits), a deer, as well as the main parc attraction: marmots.

A pedagogical team would verify the visitors' demeanour, while keeping them informed – along with didactical panels. A Pyrenean map, regularly updated, shows in real time the position of each member of the 25 bears currently living in freedom in the massif. A footprint molding workshop enables visitors to learn how to recognize animal footprints in the wild.

The building at the entrance (an old bigourdan stable from the middle of the 19th century) hosts a museum reconstructing, under thematical tableaus in three oral dimensions the life of wild animals of the northern hemisphere, Europe and Africa. A souvenir shop lies at the exit – with marmot stuffed toys, namely.

== Short list of animals in the park ==
- Marmot
- Deer
- European otter (in a setting which allows the visitor to see them thrive in and out of the water)
- Squirrel
- Brown bear
- Fox
- Wolf
- Isard
- Mouflon
- Lynx
- Ibex
- Giant otter (rarely seen)

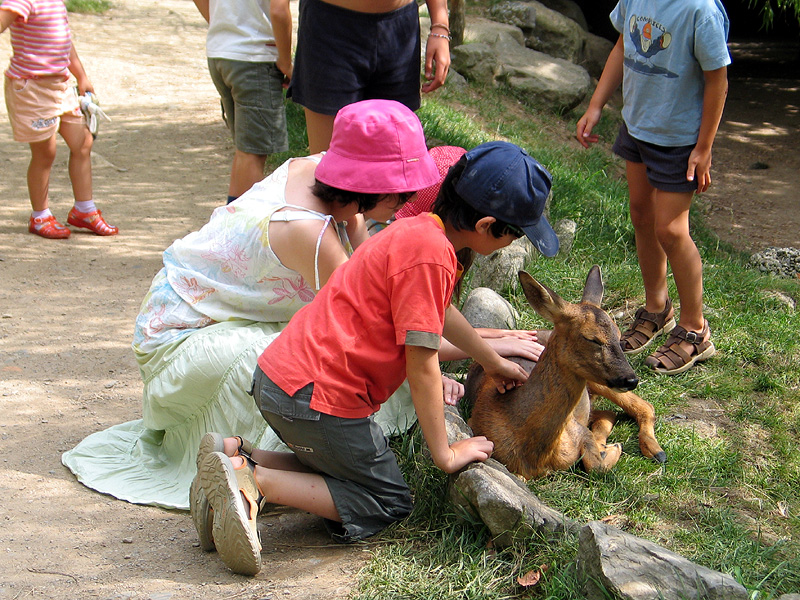
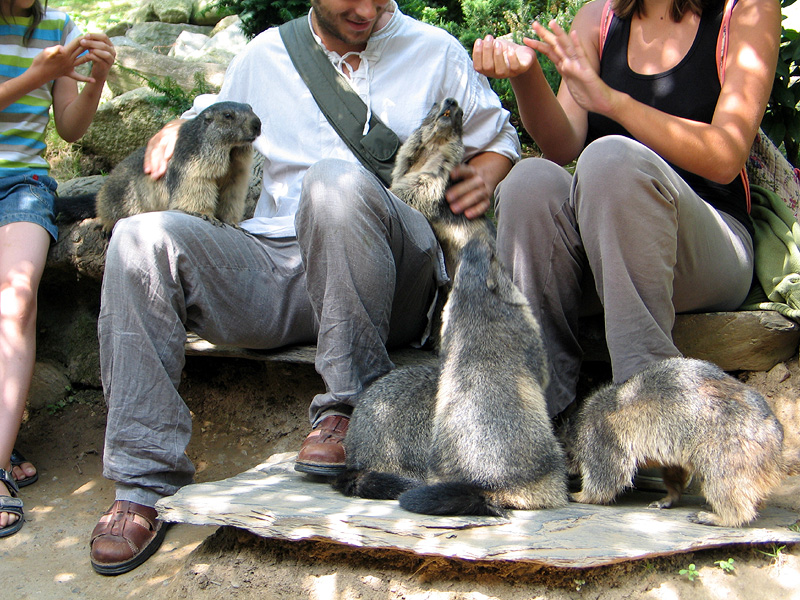

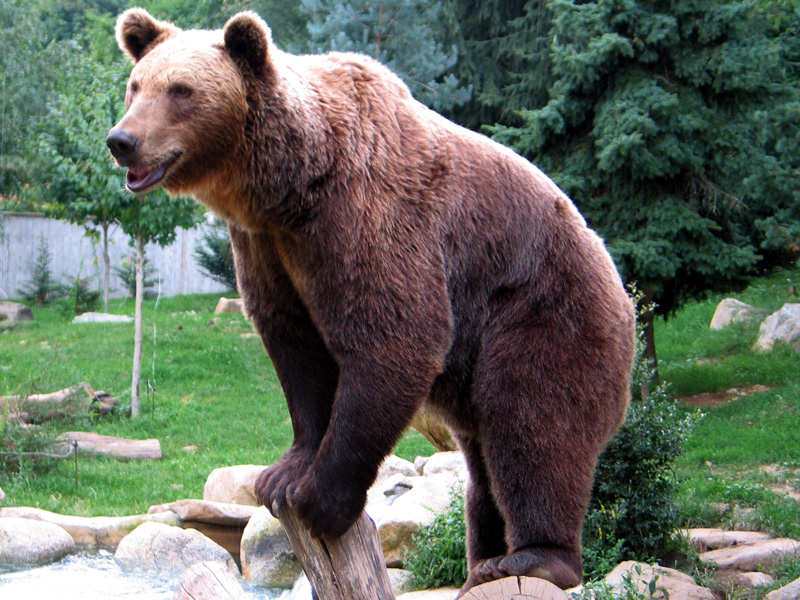
