= Gourette =

Winter sports resort in the French Pyrenees

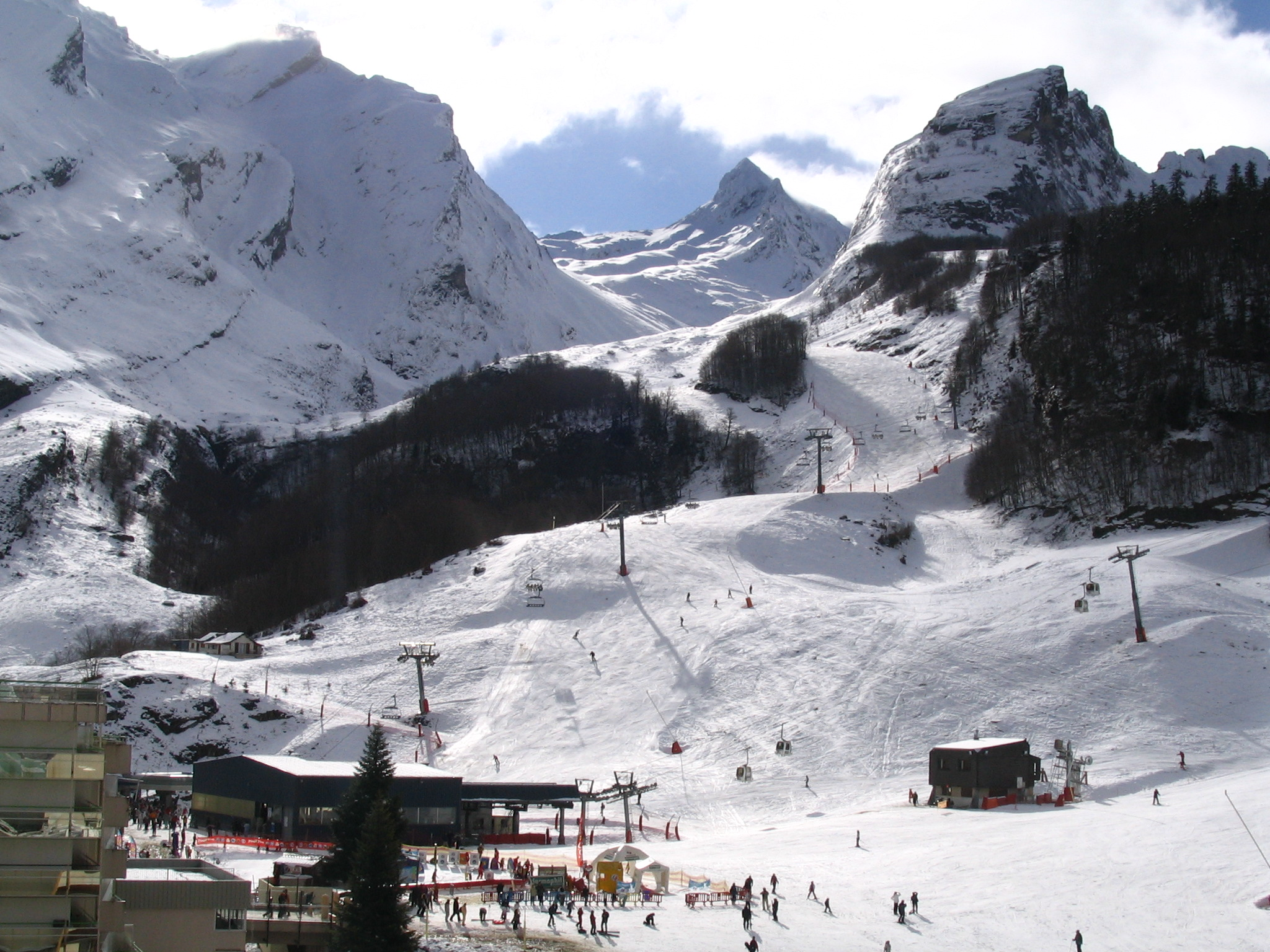
- Gourette in winter

- Location within France Location within Nouvelle-Aquitaine Location within Pyrenees
- Location: Eaux-Bonnes, Pyrénées-Atlantiques, Nouvelle-Aquitaine, France
- Nearest city: Pau
- Coordinates: 42°57′25″N 0°19′55″W
- Top elevation: 2,450 m (8,040 ft)
- Base elevation: 1,350 m (4,430 ft)
- Trails: 36
- Total length: 42 km (26 mi)
- Website: www.gourette.com

Gourette (French: [ɡuʁɛt]; Béarnese: Goreta) is a winter sports resort in the French Pyrenees. It is located in the commune of Eaux-Bonnes in the department of Pyrénées-Atlantiques and the region of Nouvelle-Aquitaine on the D 918 road which passes through the Col d'Aubisque mountain pass. The closest air access is Pau Pyrénées Airport. The resort is at an altitude of 1,400 m (4,600 ft) with a ski area of 140 ha (350 acres) and 42 km (26 mi) of marked slopes. The ski area extends between 1,350 and 2,450 m (4,430 and 8,040 ft) above sea level. Gourette is part of the N'PY group of ski resorts.

== Geography ==
Gourette is located in the high Béarn in the French Pyrenees, in the Valentin Valley which extends east from the Ossau Valley. The Valentin stream has its source above Lake Uzious, a tarn near the France–Spain border, and joins the Gave d'Ossau at Laruns. Gourette is located on the D 918, about 3 km (1.9 mi) south of the Col d'Aubisque on its western side. This is the road through the Col d'Aubisque and the Col du Soulor. The ski area of Artouste is 8 km (5 mi) to the southwest of Gourette.

=== Climate ===
Gourette is one of the few resorts in the Pyrenees to offer a difference in altitude of more than 1,000 m (3,300 ft), having an altitude of between 1,350 and 2,450 m (4,430 and 8,040 ft), which is regularly covered in snow from November to April. The Atlantic climate of this western part of the Pyrenees is very often snowy when the north-westerly winds are blocked by the mountains of the high Pyrenees. While the Spanish Pyrenees, a few kilometres further south, suffer from dry winters, the northern French side is buried by heavy snowfall. Thaws, accompanied by foehns, can erode the surface snow for a few days. However, snowfall usually resumes quickly and the resort regains its winter aspect, even late in the winter season.

== History ==
Gourette is located on the Route thermale des Pyrénées, opened at the instigation of Napoleon III and Empress Eugénie from 1859 to link Eaux-Bonnes and Bagnères-de-Bigorre via the Col d'Aubisque and Col du Soulor.

=== The mining landscape ===
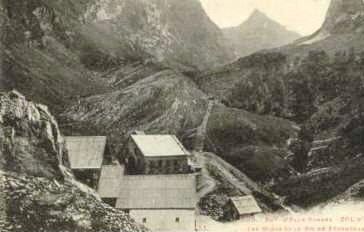
The mines and the elevated railway towards the Pic des Bécottes, circa 1910.

In 1881, the municipal council of Eaux-Bonnes, foreseeing a new source of income for the commune, authorised mining in the mountains above Gourette. The exploitation of the gold and silver ore discovered was entrusted to the Société des Mines d'Arre. During the winter of 1882–83, 33 workers wintered at an altitude of 2,100 m (6,900 ft) while mining. On 18 November 1882, an avalanche swept away their barracks, killing sixteen people, including thirteen Italians. The Arre deposit was abandoned three years later in favour of the Lake Anglas deposit.

In 1890, about a hundred miners were working on mining the various deposits. A railway was built to remove the ore and an elevated railway descended for 3 km (1.9 mi) along the upper Valentin valley to the Cirque de Gourette. About forty tonnes of ore were sorted and crushed every day at the Gourette site, before being transferred to Laruns by wagon. From there, the ore went by rail to Bayonne, England and Spain. During 1888, 3,720 tons of ore were exported, which remained the best year by far. The mines continued to be exploited episodically until 1916.

=== Skiing at Gourette ===
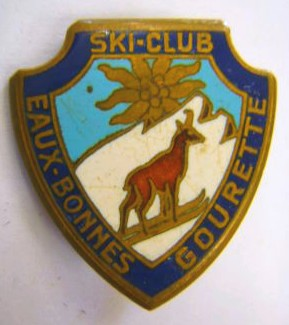
The Eaux-Bonnes Gourette ski club insignia of the 1930s

==== Origins ====
In November 1903, Henri Sallenave, brother of the future mayor of Pau, bought skis from the Manufacture de Saint-Étienne. After a trial on the slopes of the Benou plateau in nearby Bilhères, he climbed the Pic de Ger above Gourette.

The municipality of Eaux-Bonnes saw the development of winter sports as an opportunity. On 15 and 16 February 1908, the first international ski competition in the Pyrenees was organised there. On 20 and 21 February 1909, King Alfonso XIII of Spain attended. In 1910, the commune shared the France ski championship with Cauterets. A ski slope, an ice rink and a ski jumping hill were built for the occasion. (Note: This ski jumping hill no longer exists today. It was the only one in the Pyrenees.)

==== 1930s mountain resort ====
With the road being surfaced in 1930, electricity and telephone began the development of the resort. The first avalanche barriers were built, securing access and the first regular coach lines linked Gourette to Laruns, Pau and even Bordeaux. The opening of the first hotel with central heating was a significant moment. This removed the need for skiers to go to Eaux-Bonnes or Pau for accommodation. The hotel was quickly monopolised by a wealthy Bordeaux clientele who gave the resort a high profile. The Hotel de l'Aubisque, the Edelweiss and the Chalet de l'Amoulat followed.

==== Late twentieth century onwards ====
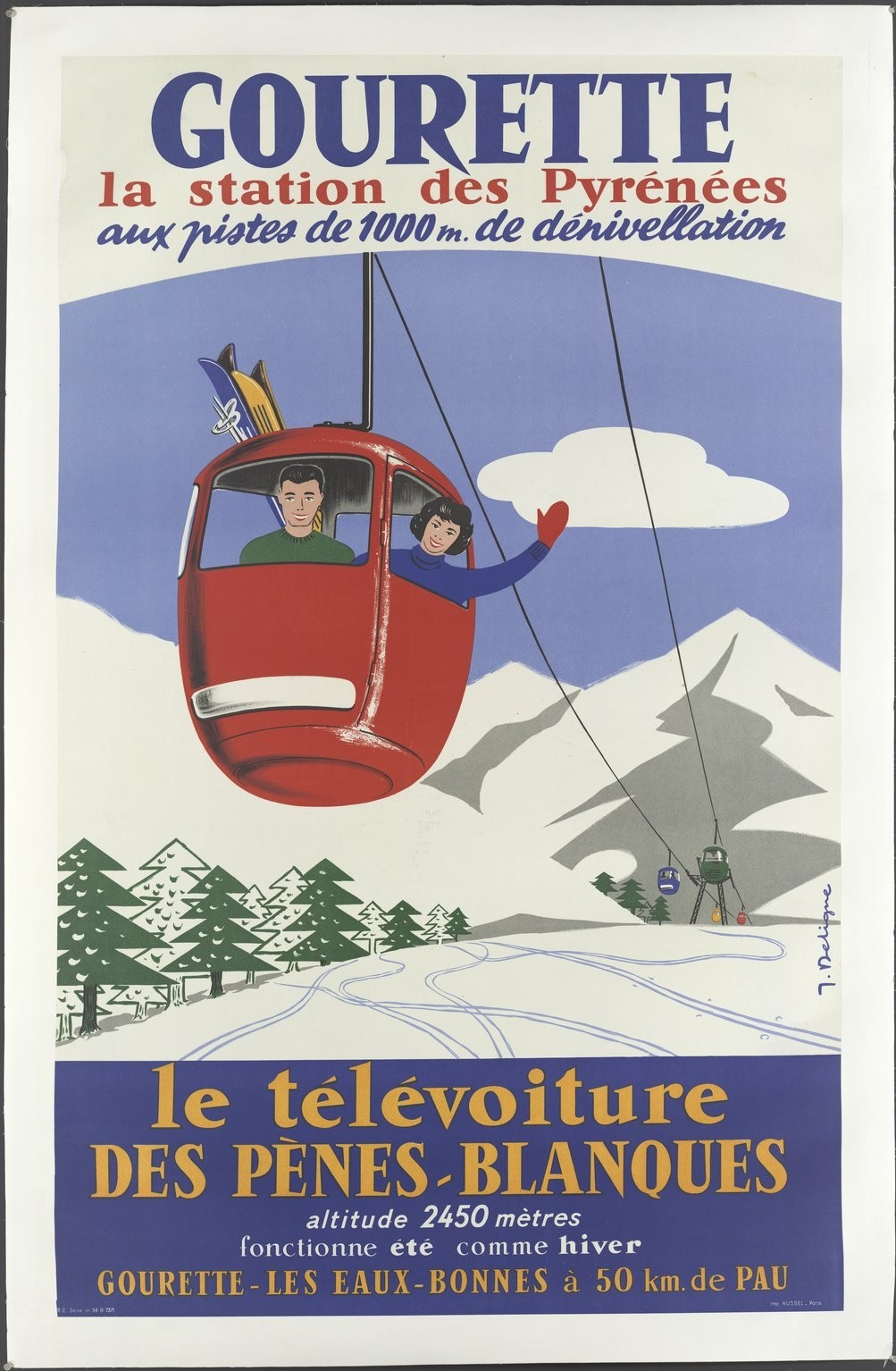
A 1960s advertising poster for Gourette

From the end of the 1960s, the resort was urbanised.

On 1 February 2015, the resort experienced a major avalanche that swept away the departure station of the Fontaines de Cotch ski lift as well as an electric generator. As a result, three-quarters of the resort's lifts were without electricity. The disappearance of this lift, in a general context where there was a sharp fall the number of tourists to Gourette has caused new consideration about the future of the resort and the development of current and new areas, such as the Anglas sector and even the link with the neighbouring resort of Artouste, supported in particular by a local association. In the heart of the village, the resort was also subject to concerns due to its ageing infrastructure. The buildings of the Valentin residences were renovated, while the tourist centre of the resort experienced rapid deterioration due to a lack of maintenance.

==== Planned restructuring ====
To deal with the problems of declining attendance and the ageing of the resort, as well as those linked to climate change, the Pyrénées-Atlantiques department embarked on a restructuring project for Gourette in 2020. This began with the redevelopment and reprofiling of the beginner sector of Bézou, and the dismantling of a gondola lift to open up the panorama of the meeting area at the centre of the resort. The project, which has been increased to €27 million, will restructure the resort by installing a second meeting area at an altitude of between 1,500 and 1,600 m (4,900 and 5,200 ft) in order to take into account the hazards linked to climate change, and thus allow Gourette to continue to operate with little snow. Thus, several lifts were planned to be dismantled to comply with the project, which is scheduled to end in 2025. However, in particular, the dismantling of the Cotch detachable chairlift was not unanimously accepted, as this links Gourette with the top of the resort.

== Sport ==
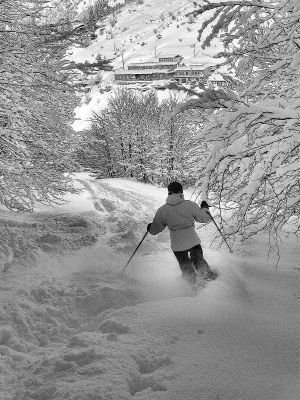
Woodland skiing at Gourette

=== Winter activities ===
In winter, the resort offers one of the largest skiable areas in the Pyrenean chain with thirty marked trails, and extending between 1,350 and 2,450 m (4,430 and 8,040 ft) in altitude, covering about 140 ha (350 acres) of mostly north-facing slopes. The area also hosts snowboarding and snowshoe trails. In 2005 the region spent over 50 million euros to improve its winter resort facilities, including trails, lifts, accommodation and other infrastructure.

==== Skiing ====
The resort is organized into four sectors and a meeting area.

The Pène Blanque sector is at the top of the resort at 2,450 m (8,040 ft) of altitude. The Cotch sector is the second highest sector and was located at 2,124 m (6,969 ft) above sea level before the destruction of the chairlift due to the 2015 avalanche. Since then, it has been located at an altitude of 2,060 m (6,760 ft). The Plateau sector is in a wooded area and located at intermediate altitude in the resort. The sector has a mountain restaurant and a snowpark. This sector is also one of the junction points of most of the ski slopes, receiving those of the Bézou, Cotch and Pène Blanque sectors. The Bézou sector is dedicated to beginners. In addition to beginner and easy slopes, there is a mountain restaurant, a sledging area, and a Nordic skiing circuit linked to the bottom of the resort.

The meeting area and the return slopes are located on the lower part of the resort, in a very wooded area where Nordic skiing and snowshoeing is possible. A beginners' route, "La balade", runs through the woods slightly away from the main routes of the resort. All the sectors of the resort converge on the main meeting area, a wide space leading to the Esplanade du Valentin and the Place Sarrière, in the centre of the resort of Gourette.

=== Summer activities ===
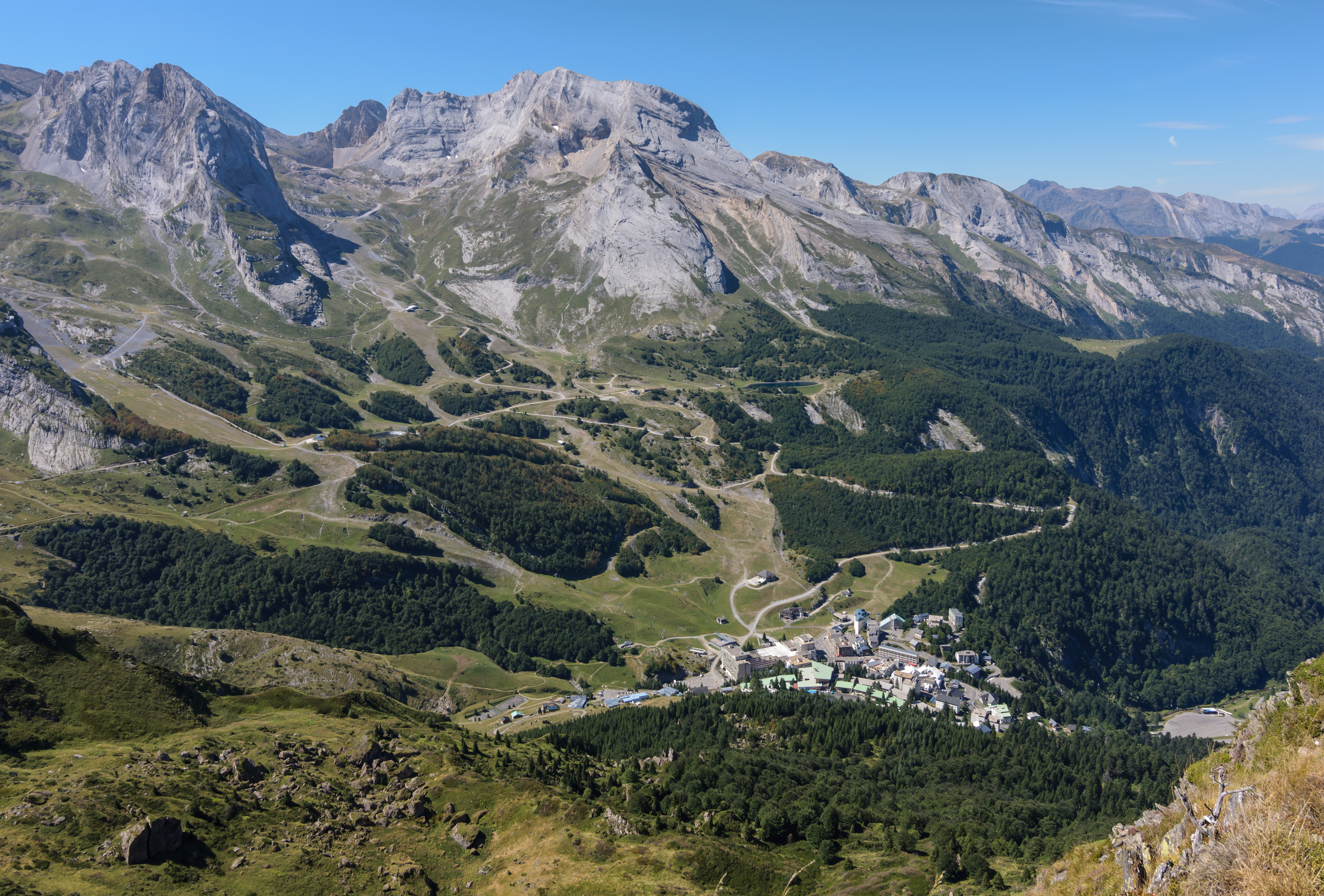
Gourette in summer. As soon as one moves away from the station, the cirque de Gourette is visible in its full extent.

In summer, tourists visit the valley of the Gave d'Ossau and its lakes for sightseeing, hiking, biking, rock climbing, and mountaineering, including the ascent of Pic du Midi d'Ossau (2,884 m (9,462 ft)). The French GR 10 hiking trail, which covers over 800 km (500 mi) from one end of the Pyrenees to the other, passes through the village.

==== Hiking trails ====
From Gourette, short hiking routes go via the GR 10 to Lake Anglas, Lake Uzious, Lake Lavedan, Lakes of Louesque, and the Soussouéou Valley to the south, and to the Col de Tortes, Col d'Aubisque, Col du Soulor, and the Ouzom Valley to the north and east. Other secondary trails lead in the direction of Eaux-Bonnes, or to the ski area leading to the Col d'Anglas via the Lakes of Plaa Ségouné and the Lake Cinda Blanque. The remains of the mining facilities are visible in the Lake Anglas area.

==== Cycling ====
The resort has had many amateur and professional cycling events pass through. Whenever the Tour de France uses the western side of the Col d'Aubisque, either as an ascent or descent, the race passes through Gourette. The road through the Col d'Aubisque, cresting at an altitude of 1,710 m (5,610 ft), has gradients from 7.5 to 10% and is considered a Hors Catégorie climb in Union Cycliste Internationale race classifications. The race first passed through Gourette during the 1910 Tour de France, on a stage from Luchon to Bayonne. The finishes of Stage 16a of the 1971 Tour de France and Stage 16 of the 2007 Tour de France took place at Gourette. The finish of Stage 14 of the 2016 Vuelta a Espana was also hosted by Gourette.
