= Col d'Aubisque =

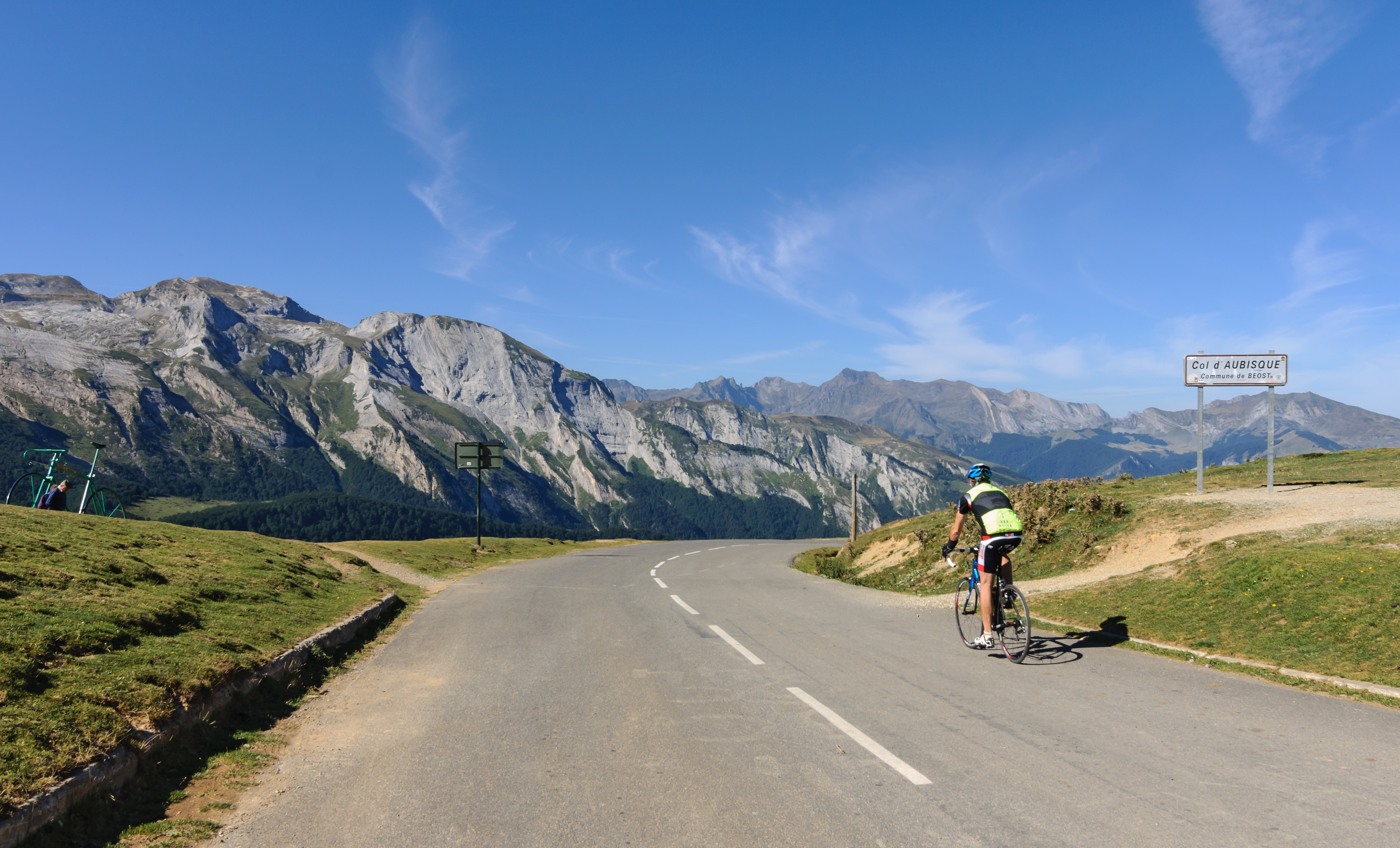
- The Col d'Aubisque, on the road towards Gourette and the Ossau Valley

- Location within Pyrenees
- Elevation: 1,709 m (5,607 ft)
- Traversed by: D918

Third Approach
- Location: Pyrénées-Atlantiques, France
- Range: Pyrenees
- Coordinates: 42°58′36″N 0°20′23″W

The Col d'Aubisque (Occitan: Còth d'Aubisca) (elevation 1,709 m (5,607 ft)) is a mountain pass in the Pyrenees 30 km (19 mi) south of Tarbes and Pau in the department of the Pyrénées-Atlantiques, in the Aquitaine region of France.

The pass is on the northern slopes of the Pic de Ger (2,613 m (8,573 ft)) and connects Laruns, in the valley of the Gave d'Ossau, via Eaux-Bonnes (west) to Argelès-Gazost, in the valley of the Gave de Pau, via the Col du Soulor (east). The road crosses the Cirque du Litor, in the upper part of the Ouzom valley. It is generally closed from December to June.

The pass is the starting point of several excursions and a centre for winter sports. In summer, it is popular with cyclists. It is regularly part of the Tour de France, generally rated an hors catégorie (beyond categorization) climb.

== The col ==
The summit of the col is marked by a commemorative plaque to André Bach (1888–1945), a member of Legion of Honour and President of the Cyclo Club of Béarn (C.C.B.). André Bach was mutilated during World War I, losing his left arm in 1916. In 1943 he was deported to the Buchenwald concentration camp in Germany, and he died in May 1945 at Boulay-Moselle while returning home. The stele was inaugurated on 26 September 1948, and every year is the focus of a memorial ride.

The inscription reads:
André Bach 1888–1945
Officier de la Légion d'honneur
Grand mutilé – Président du C.C.B. – Mort en Déportation
Pour perpétuer son souvenir en ce lieu qu'il aimait tant
Ses amis Les Cyclotouristes du C.C.B. 1948

In English:

"André Bach 1888–1945
Officer of the Honour Legion
Grand mutilated – President of the C.C.B. – Dead from Deportation
To continue his memory in this place he liked so much
His friends the Cyclotouristes du C.C.B.;1948"

== Details of the climb ==
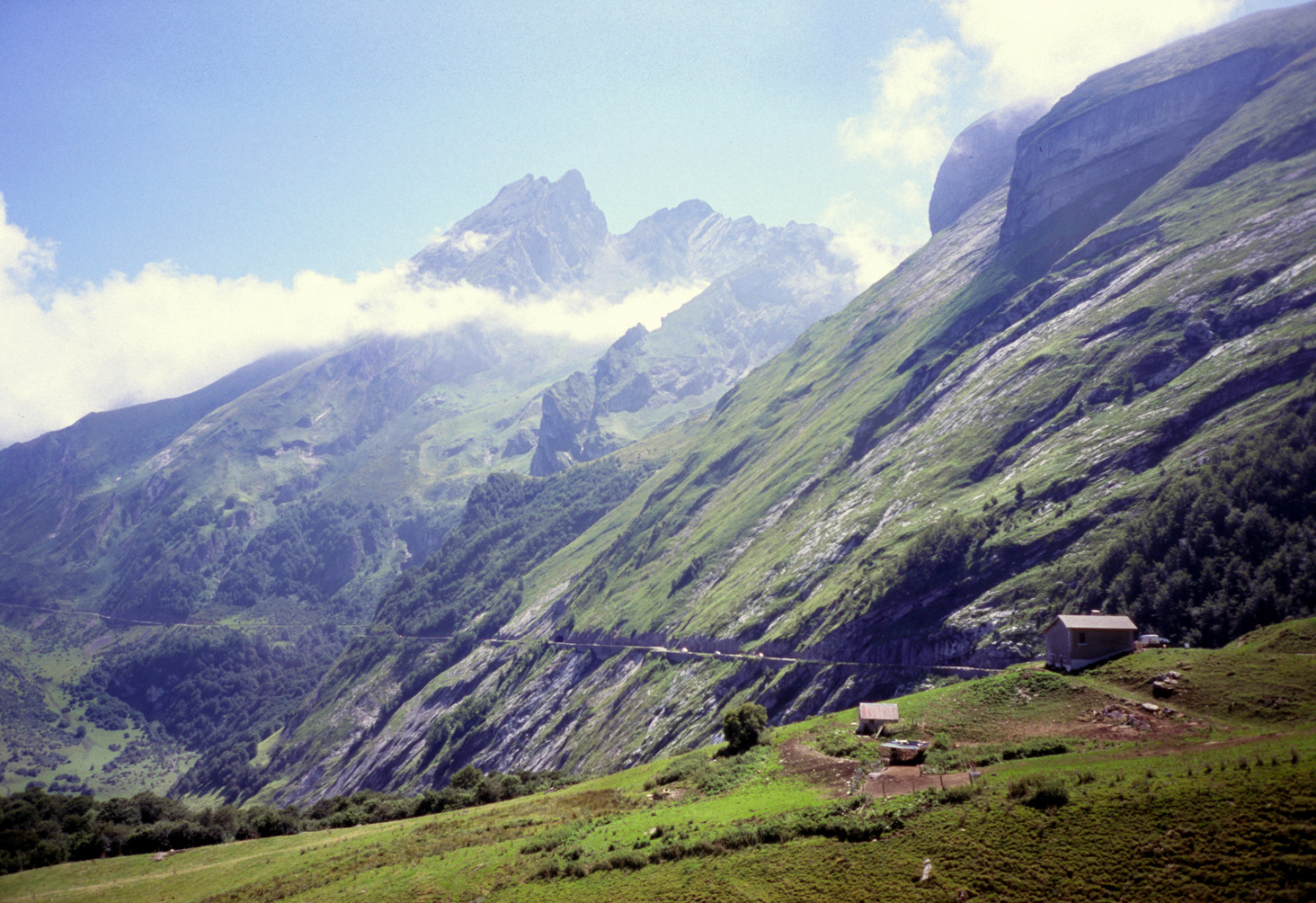
The road from Col d'Aubisque to Soulor

From the west, the climb to the Aubisque starts in Laruns. From there, the Aubisque is 16.6 km (10.3 mi) and rises 1,190 m (3,900 ft), an average gradient of 7.2%. The first few kilometres, to the spa resort of Eaux-Bonnes, are fairly easy. After the Cascade de Valentin comes a section at 13%. From there to the top, the climb is 8.0 km (5.0 mi) at 8% average, passing the ski resort of Gourette at 1,400 m (4,600 ft).

The east side is climbed after the Col du Soulor (1,474 m (4,836 ft)). Starting from Argelès-Gazost, the Soulor is 19.5 km (12.1 mi). It rises 1,019 m (3,343 ft), an average gradient of 5.2%. It gets tougher after Arrens-Marsous with 10% and more. From the Soulor, the climb is 10.6 km (6.6 mi), gaining a further 235 m (771 ft). The road from the Soulor runs along cliffs in the Cirque du Litor, where there are two short, narrow tunnels. From the Cirque du Litor, the climb is 7.5 km (4.7 mi) at 4.6%, a height gain of 350 m (1,150 ft).

Writing in Vélo, Gilbert Duclos-Lassalle said:

The Aubisque is one of those hors catégorie cols that make the legend of the Tour. The climb is in three parts. The first is fairly easy. The road is good and the specialists use 39 × 19 or 53 × 21. Then, at Eaux-Bonnes, you turn left and get to the real climb. This part, as far as Gourette, is a lot more difficult. The hardest part swings between eight and ten per cent from the seventh kilometre until Pont-du-Goua at the ninth kilometre and you need 39 × 21. Then, after 300m of flat in Gourette, a hairpin goes up to the Hôtel des Crêtes Blanches. Riders use 39 × 17 over four kilometres before going into 39 × 16 in the last two kilometres.

== Tour de France ==
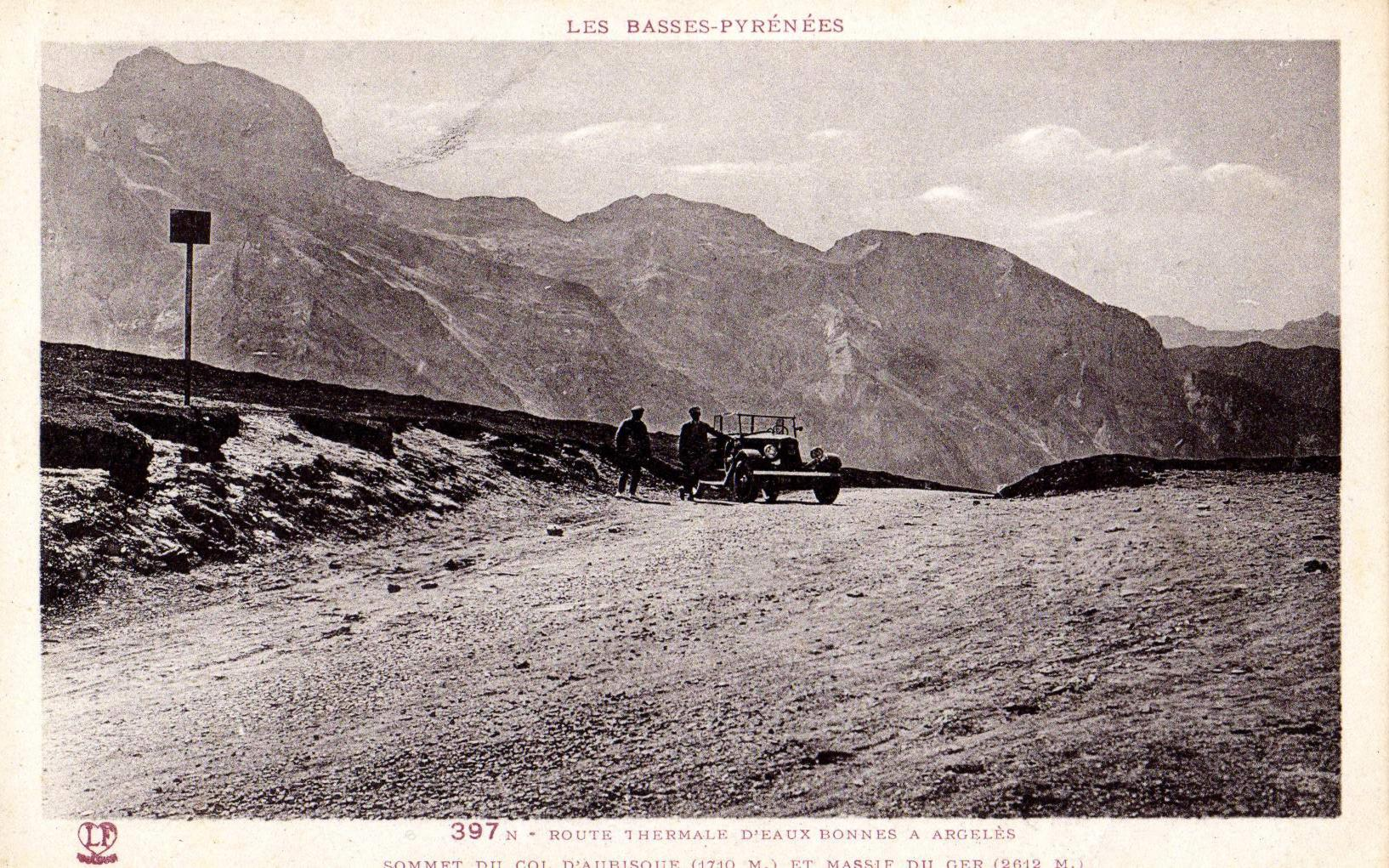
The Aubisque in 1910.

The Col d'Aubisque first appeared in the Tour de France in 1910, crossed by François Lafourcade. It has appeared frequently since then, more than once every two years. It was included at the insistence of Alphone Steinès, a colleague of Henri Desgrange at the Tour de France. Steinès visited the local road engineer (the ingénieur des ponts-et-chaussées) who said: "Take the riders up the Aubisque? You're completely crazy in Paris." Steinès agreed that the Tour would pay 5,000 francs to clear the pass. Desgrange knocked the price down to 2,000.

In 1951, Wim van Est was in the yellow jersey – the first Dutchman to wear it and chasing the leaders towards the Soulor when he slipped on gravel and fell into a ravine. He said:

That first bend was wet, slippery from the snow. And there were sharp stones on the road that the cars had kicked up, and my front wheel hit them and I went over. Well, there was a drop of 20m. They've built a barrier there now but then there was nothing to stop you going over. I fell 20 metres, rolling and rolling and rolling. My feet had come out of the straps, my bike had disappeared, and there was a little flat area, the only one that's there, no bigger than the seat of a chair, and I landed on my backside. A metre left or right and I'd have dropped onto solid stone, six or seven hundred metres down. My ankles were all hurt, my elbows were kaput. I was all bruised and shaken up and I didn't know where I was, but nothing was broken.

The team's manager, Kees Pellenaars, took a tow rope from the Dutch team's car. It was too short to reach van Est and so to it he tied 40 racing tyres, and thus he was pulled out. Van Est said: "It was all the tyres that Pellenaars had for the team. By the time they'd tugged me up, they were all stretched and they wouldn't stay on the wheels any more! Forty tyres! I wanted to get back on my bike and start racing again. But I couldn't. Pellenaars stopped the whole team."

Van Est told journalists: "I had the feeling that I was taking that bend badly but I so much wanted to keep the yellow jersey, so I went flat out and off I flew. A monument spot 50 years later, on 17 July 2001, says: "Here on 17 July 1951 the cyclist Wim van Est fell 70 metres. He survived but lost the yellow jersey." A newspaper advertisement in the Netherlands showed van Est displaying the watch that he'd worn, with the legend: "My heart stopped, but not my Pontiac."

=== Tour de France stage finishes ===
Stage 16 of the 2007 Tour de France finished at the summit of the Aubisque. There has been one previous finish at the summit (in 1985). In 1971, stage 16a finished at Gourette on the western approaches to Aubisque.

Year	Stage	Start of stage	Distance (km)	Category of climb	Stage winner	Yellow jersey
2007	16	Orthez	218.5	HC	Michael Rasmussen (DEN)	Michael Rasmussen (DEN)
1985	18a	Luz-Saint-Sauveur	52.5	1	Stephen Roche (IRL)	Bernard Hinault (FRA)
1971	16a	Bagnères-de-Luchon	145	1	Bernard Labourdette (FRA)	Eddy Merckx (BEL)

Rasmussen won stage 16 in 2007, confirming himself as favourite for victory in Paris, but that evening was sacked by his team and removed from the race.

=== Passages in the Tour de France (since 1947) ===
There have been 47 passages over the summit since 1947, making it the second most visited mountain in the race's history.

Year	Stage	Category	Start	Finish	Leader at the summit
2022	18	HC	Lourdes	Hautacam	Giulio Ciccone (ITA)
2018	19	HC	Lourdes	Laruns	Rafał Majka (POL)
2012	16	HC	Pau	Bagnères-de-Luchon	Thomas Voeckler (FRA)
2011	13	HC	Pau	Lourdes	Jérémy Roy (FRA)
2010	16	HC	Bagnères-de-Luchon	Pau	Christophe Moreau (FRA)
2005	16	HC	Mourenx	Pau	Cadel Evans (AUS)
2002	11	HC	Pau	La Mongie	Laurent Jalabert (FRA)
2000	10	2	Dax	Hautacam	Javier Otxoa (ESP)
1999	16	1	Lannemezan	Pau	Alberto Elli (ITA)
1998	10	HC	Pau	Bagnères-de-Luchon	Cédric Vasseur (FRA)
1996	17	1	Argelès-Gazost	Pamplona	Neil Stephens (AUS)
1995	16	2	Tarbes	Pau	Stage neutralised
1993	17	1	Tarbes	Pau	Claudio Chiappucci (ITA)
1991	13	HC	Jaca	Val-Louron	Guido Winterberg (SUI)
1990	17	HC	Lourdes	Pau	Óscar Vargas (COL)
1989	9	HC	Pau	Cauterets	Miguel Induráin (ESP)
1987	14	HC	Pau	Luz Ardiden	Thierry Claveyrolat (FRA)
1985	18b	HC	Laruns	Pau	Reynel Montoya (COL)
1983	10	HC	Pau	Bagnères-de-Luchon	Lucien Van Impe (BEL)
1982	12	1	Fleurance	Pau	Beat Breu (SUI)
1980	13	HC	Pau	Bagnères-de-Luchon	Maurice Le Guilloux (FRA)
1977	2	1	Auch	Pau	Hennie Kuiper (NED)
1976	15	1	Saint-Lary-Soulan	Pau	Wladimiro Panizza (ITA)
1972	7	1	Bayonne	Pau	Wilfried David (BEL)
1971	16	1	Bagnères-de-Luchon	Gourette	Bernard Labourdette (FRA)
1970	19	1	Bagnères-de-Bigorre	Mourenx	Raymond Delisle (FRA)
1969	17	1	La Mongie	Mourenx	Eddy Merckx (BEL)
1968	12	1	Pau	Saint-Gaudens	Julio Jiménez (ESP)
1967	17	1	Bagnères-de-Luchon	Pau	Jean-Claude Theillière (FRA)
1966	10	1	Bayonne	Pau	Tommaso De Pra (ITA)
1965	9	1	Dax	Bagnères-de-Bigorre	Julio Jiménez (ESP)
1964	16	1	Bagnères-de-Luchon	Pau	Federico Bahamontes (ESP)
1963	10	1	Pau	Bagnères-de-Bigorre	Federico Bahamontes (ESP)
1961	17	1	Bagnères-de-Luchon	Pau	Eddy Pauwels (BEL)
1960	10	1	Mont-de-Marsan	Pau	Graziano Battistini (ITA)
1958	13	1	Dax	Pau	Federico Bahamontes (ESP)
1957	18	1	Saint-Gaudens	Pau	Jean Dotto (FRA)
1956	11	1	Bayonne	Pau	Valentin Huot (FRA)
1955	18	1	Saint-Gaudens	Pau	Charly Gaul (LUX)
1954	11	1	Bayonne	Pau	Federico Bahamontes (ESP)
1953	10	1	Pau	Cauterets	Jesús Loroño (ESP)
1952	18	1	Bagnères-de-Bigorre	Pau	Fausto Coppi (ITA)
1951	13	1	Dax	Tarbes	Raphaël Géminiani (FRA)
1950	11	1	Pau	Saint-Gaudens	Jean Robic (FRA)
1949	11	1	Pau	Bagnères-de-Luchon	Fausto Coppi (ITA)
1948	7	1	Biarritz	Lourdes	Bernard Gauthier (FRA)
1947	15	1	Bagnères-de-Luchon	Pau	Jean Robic (FRA)

== Vuelta a España ==
=== Vuelta a España stage finishes ===
Stage 14 of the 2016 Vuelta a España finished at the summit of the Aubisque.

Year	Stage	Start of stage	Distance (km)	Category of climb	Stage winner	Red jersey
2016	14	Urdax-Dantxarinea	196	Especial	Robert Gesink (NLD)	Nairo Quintana (COL)

== See also ==
- Souvenir Henri Desgrange
