= Julienne David =

French privateer

Julienne David (c. 1773-1843), was a French privateer.

Julienne David participated in the Vendée Revolt on the royalists side and was imprisoned, but managed to escape sentence. After having secured a privateer's letter, she persecuted British ships on the English channel from her base in Nantes.

In 1803, she was imprisoned in England for 8 years. After her release, she returned to France. A street in Nantes is named after her. She is also the subject of a novel.
