= Argelès-Gazost =

- Subprefecture and commune
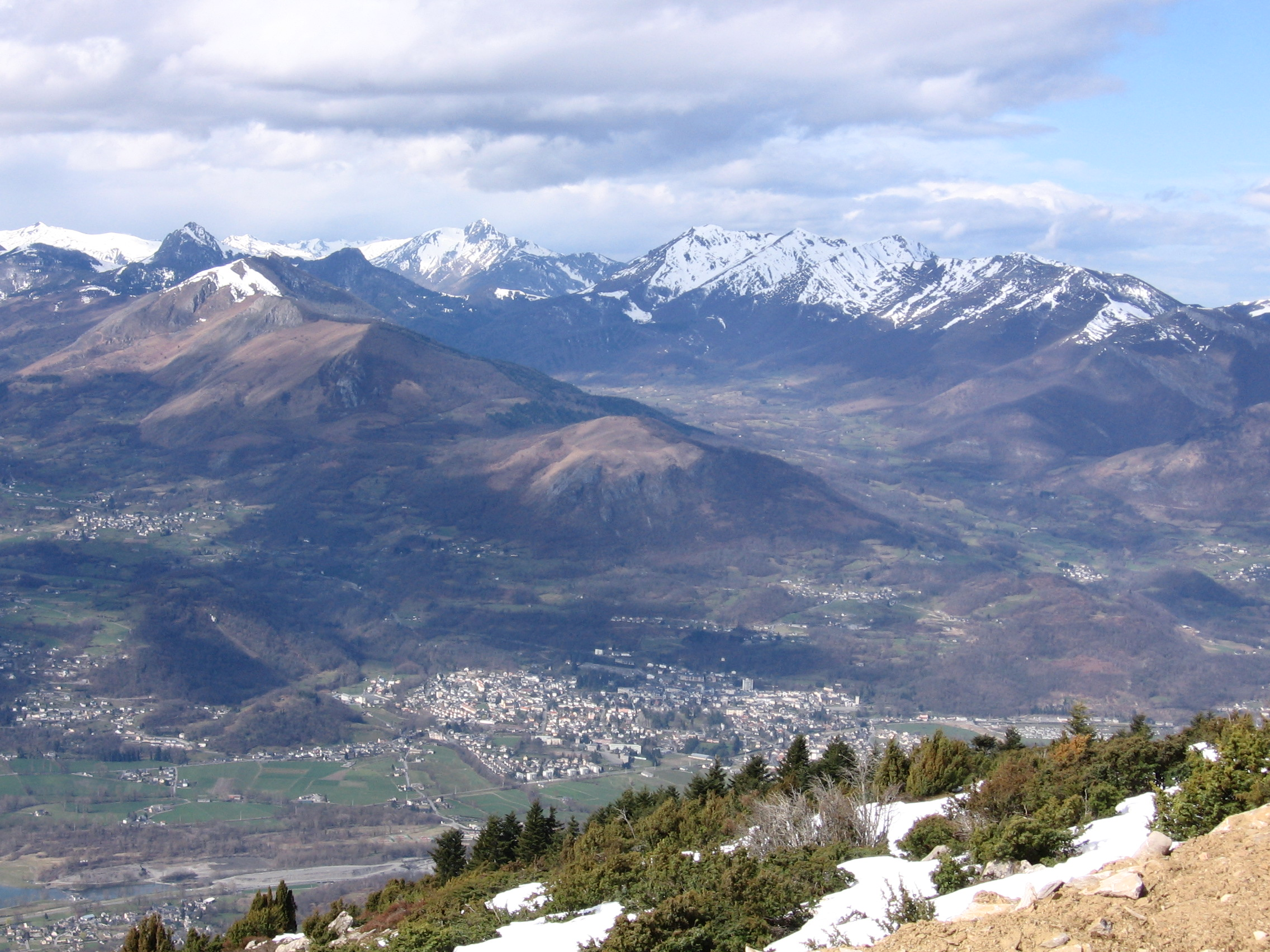
- The view of the village from Hautacam

- Coat of arms
- Location of Argelès-Gazost
- Location within France Location within Occitanie
- Coordinates: 43°00′N 0°06′W
- Country: France
- Region: Occitania
- Department: Hautes-Pyrénées
- Arrondissement: Argelès-Gazost
- Canton: La Vallée des Gaves

Government
  - Mayor (2020–2026): Gaëlle Vallin
- Area^{1}: 3.05 km^{2} (1.18 sq mi)
- Elevation: 460 m (1,510 ft)
- Highest elevation: 600 m (2,000 ft)
- Lowest elevation: 412 m (1,352 ft)
- Population (2023): 2,761
  - Density: 905/km^{2} (2,340/sq mi)
- Time zone: UTC+01:00 (CET)
  - Summer (DST): UTC+02:00 (CEST)
- INSEE/Postal code: 65025 /65400
- ^{1} French Land Register data, which excludes lakes, ponds, glaciers > 1 km^{2} (0.386 sq mi or 247 acres) and river estuaries.

Argelès-Gazost (French pronunciation: [aʁʒəlɛs ɡazɔst]; Occitan: Argelèrs de Gasòst) is a commune and a subprefecture of the Hautes-Pyrénées department in southwestern France.

The Pyrénées Animal Park is located in Argelès-Gazost.

== Population ==
Historical population

Year	Pop.	±% p.a.
1793	775	—
1800	713	−1.18%
1806	831	+2.59%
1821	878	+0.37%
1831	1,357	+4.45%
1836	1,420	+0.91%
1841	1,589	+2.27%
1846	1,684	+1.17%
1851	1,662	−0.26%
1856	1,684	+0.26%
1861	1,686	+0.02%
1866	1,698	+0.14%
1872	1,658	−0.40%
1876	1,743	+1.26%
1881	1,808	+0.73%
1886	1,894	+0.93%
1891	1,733	−1.76%
1896	1,882	+1.66%
1901	1,836	−0.49%

Year	Pop.	±% p.a.
1906	1,737	−1.10%
1911	1,739	+0.02%
1921	1,632	−0.63%
1926	1,669	+0.45%
1931	1,719	+0.59%
1936	2,019	+3.27%
1946	2,317	+1.39%
1954	2,556	+1.23%
1962	3,414	+3.68%
1968	3,629	+1.02%
1975	3,455	−0.70%
1982	3,304	−0.64%
1990	3,229	−0.29%
1999	3,241	+0.04%
2007	3,255	+0.05%
2012	3,069	−1.17%
2017	2,901	−1.12%
2023	2,761	−0.82%

Source: EHESS and INSEE (1968-2023)

== Climate ==
Climate data for Argelès-Gazost (Ayros-Arbouix), elevation 478 m (1,568 ft), (1991–2020 normals, extremes 1982–present)
Month	Jan	Feb	Mar	Apr	May	Jun	Jul	Aug	Sep	Oct	Nov	Dec	Year
Record high °C (°F)	24.0 (75.2)	26.4 (79.5)	27.5 (81.5)	33.0 (91.4)	34.3 (93.7)	39.6 (103.3)	40.0 (104.0)	41.5 (106.7)	36.0 (96.8)	34.6 (94.3)	28.5 (83.3)	27.5 (81.5)	41.5 (106.7)
Mean daily maximum °C (°F)	11.2 (52.2)	11.8 (53.2)	14.9 (58.8)	16.4 (61.5)	20.0 (68.0)	23.3 (73.9)	25.4 (77.7)	25.9 (78.6)	22.8 (73.0)	19.4 (66.9)	14.2 (57.6)	11.7 (53.1)	18.1 (64.6)
Daily mean °C (°F)	6.5 (43.7)	6.9 (44.4)	9.7 (49.5)	11.3 (52.3)	14.8 (58.6)	18.0 (64.4)	20.0 (68.0)	20.3 (68.5)	17.3 (63.1)	14.3 (57.7)	9.5 (49.1)	7.3 (45.1)	13.0 (55.4)
Mean daily minimum °C (°F)	1.9 (35.4)	2.0 (35.6)	4.4 (39.9)	6.2 (43.2)	9.6 (49.3)	12.7 (54.9)	14.7 (58.5)	14.8 (58.6)	11.8 (53.2)	9.2 (48.6)	4.9 (40.8)	2.9 (37.2)	7.9 (46.2)
Record low °C (°F)	−17.5 (0.5)	−13.0 (8.6)	−10.0 (14.0)	−4.2 (24.4)	−1.5 (29.3)	3.0 (37.4)	6.0 (42.8)	4.0 (39.2)	2.0 (35.6)	−2.0 (28.4)	−9.0 (15.8)	−8.0 (17.6)	−17.5 (0.5)
Average precipitation mm (inches)	110.1 (4.33)	90.0 (3.54)	86.3 (3.40)	106.5 (4.19)	103.0 (4.06)	81.9 (3.22)	65.8 (2.59)	60.6 (2.39)	68.4 (2.69)	83.1 (3.27)	137.3 (5.41)	105.2 (4.14)	1,098.2 (43.24)
Average precipitation days (≥ 1.0 mm)	11.6	10.3	10.3	12.9	13.5	10.3	8.1	8.0	8.8	10.0	12.4	11.1	127.2
Source: Meteociel

== See also ==
- Communes of the Hautes-Pyrénées department
