= Arbéost =

- Commune
- Coat of arms
- Location of Arbéost
- Location within France Location within Occitanie
- Coordinates: 42°59′57″N 0°17′03″W
- Country: France
- Region: Occitania
- Department: Hautes-Pyrénées
- Arrondissement: Argelès-Gazost
- Canton: La Vallée des Gaves

Government
  - Mayor (2021–2026): Cyrille Fraize
- Area^{1}: 14.9 km^{2} (5.8 sq mi)
- Elevation: 780 m (2,560 ft)
- Highest elevation: 2,480 m (8,140 ft)
- Lowest elevation: 555 m (1,821 ft)
- Population (2023): 73
  - Density: 4.9/km^{2} (13/sq mi)
- Time zone: UTC+01:00 (CET)
  - Summer (DST): UTC+02:00 (CEST)
- INSEE/Postal code: 65018 /65560
- ^{1} French Land Register data, which excludes lakes, ponds, glaciers > 1 km^{2} (0.386 sq mi or 247 acres) and river estuaries.

Arbéost (French pronunciation: [aʁbeɔst]; Occitan: Arbiost) is a commune in the Hautes-Pyrénées department in southwestern France.

== Geography ==
=== Climate ===
Arbéost has an oceanic climate (Köppen climate classification Cfb). The average annual temperature in Arbéost is 10.2 °C (50.4 °F). The average annual rainfall is 1,411.1 mm (55.56 in) with November as the wettest month. The temperatures are highest on average in August, at around 17.0 °C (62.6 °F), and lowest in January, at around 4.2 °C (39.6 °F). The highest temperature ever recorded in Arbéost was 35.8 °C (96.4 °F) on 27 June 2019; the coldest temperature ever recorded was −14.9 °C (5.2 °F) on 8 February 2012.

Climate data for Arbéost (1991−2020 normals, extremes 2007−present)
Month	Jan	Feb	Mar	Apr	May	Jun	Jul	Aug	Sep	Oct	Nov	Dec	Year
Record high °C (°F)	19.0 (66.2)	23.5 (74.3)	23.2 (73.8)	25.4 (77.7)	31.4 (88.5)	35.8 (96.4)	34.3 (93.7)	34.3 (93.7)	30.7 (87.3)	26.5 (79.7)	24.5 (76.1)	22.9 (73.2)	35.8 (96.4)
Mean daily maximum °C (°F)	8.0 (46.4)	8.7 (47.7)	10.5 (50.9)	13.0 (55.4)	15.5 (59.9)	19.2 (66.6)	21.3 (70.3)	21.4 (70.5)	19.1 (66.4)	16.1 (61.0)	11.5 (52.7)	9.5 (49.1)	14.5 (58.1)
Daily mean °C (°F)	4.2 (39.6)	4.3 (39.7)	6.3 (43.3)	8.8 (47.8)	11.2 (52.2)	14.7 (58.5)	16.8 (62.2)	17.0 (62.6)	14.7 (58.5)	11.8 (53.2)	7.6 (45.7)	5.5 (41.9)	10.2 (50.4)
Mean daily minimum °C (°F)	0.3 (32.5)	0.0 (32.0)	2.0 (35.6)	4.5 (40.1)	7.0 (44.6)	10.2 (50.4)	12.4 (54.3)	12.7 (54.9)	10.3 (50.5)	7.6 (45.7)	3.8 (38.8)	1.5 (34.7)	6.0 (42.8)
Record low °C (°F)	−12.0 (10.4)	−14.9 (5.2)	−9.8 (14.4)	−6.3 (20.7)	−1.5 (29.3)	1.4 (34.5)	4.9 (40.8)	5.5 (41.9)	0.5 (32.9)	−3.1 (26.4)	−7.5 (18.5)	−11.4 (11.5)	−14.9 (5.2)
Average precipitation mm (inches)	155.1 (6.11)	123.1 (4.85)	113.5 (4.47)	125.7 (4.95)	136.3 (5.37)	127.9 (5.04)	101.0 (3.98)	69.1 (2.72)	68.5 (2.70)	97.2 (3.83)	184.5 (7.26)	109.2 (4.30)	1,411.1 (55.56)
Average precipitation days (≥ 1.0 mm)	13.4	11.8	12.9	13.4	14.9	13.5	11.2	10.0	9.6	10.3	13.3	11.3	145.6
Source: Météo-France

== Population ==
Historical population
Year	Pop.	±% p.a.
1968	200	—
1975	164	−2.80%
1982	145	−1.74%
1990	128	−1.55%
1999	121	−0.62%
2007	100	−2.35%
2012	90	−2.09%
2017	85	−1.14%
2023	73	−2.50%
Source: INSEE

== See also ==
- Communes of the Hautes-Pyrénées department
