= Ferrières, Hautes-Pyrénées =

Ferrières
- Commune
- Coat of arms
- Location of Ferrières
- Location within France Location within Occitanie
- Coordinates: 43°00′38″N 0°15′45″W
- Country: France
- Region: Occitania
- Department: Hautes-Pyrénées
- Arrondissement: Argelès-Gazost
- Canton: La Vallée des Gaves
- Intercommunality: Pays de Nay

Government
  - Mayor (2020–2026): Katty Brognoli
- Area^{1}: 16.97 km^{2} (6.55 sq mi)
- Elevation: 550 m (1,800 ft)
- Highest elevation: 1,848 m (6,063 ft)
- Lowest elevation: 453 m (1,486 ft)
- Population (2023): 94
  - Density: 5.5/km^{2} (14/sq mi)
- Time zone: UTC+01:00 (CET)
  - Summer (DST): UTC+02:00 (CEST)
- INSEE/Postal code: 65176 /65560
- ^{1} French Land Register data, which excludes lakes, ponds, glaciers > 1 km^{2} (0.386 sq mi or 247 acres) and river estuaries.

Ferrières (French pronunciation: [fɛʁjɛʁ]; Occitan: Herrèra) is a commune in the Hautes-Pyrénées department in south-western France.

== See also ==
- Communes of the Hautes-Pyrénées department
