= Henri de Gramont, 13th Duke of Gramont =

Henri de Gramont
- Duke of Gramont; Duke of Guiche, Prince of Bidache
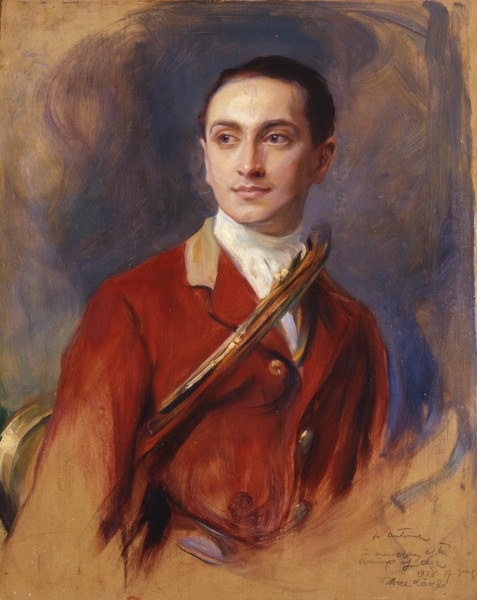
- Portrait of Gramont, by Philip de László, 1928
- Born: Antoine Agénor Henri Armand de Gramont; 17 June 1907; Paris, France
- Died: 12 December 1995 (aged 88); Les Lilas, France
- Spouse: Odile d'Heudicourt de Lenoncourt (m. 1949; died 1994)
- Issue: Antoine de Gramont, 14th Duke of Gramont
- House: Gramont
- Father: Armand de Gramont
- Mother: Élaine Greffulhe

Antoine Agénor Henri Armand de Gramont, 13th Duke of Gramont (17 June 1907 – 12 December 1995), known as the Duke of Guiche from 1925 to 1962, was a French aristocrat and landowner.

== Early life ==
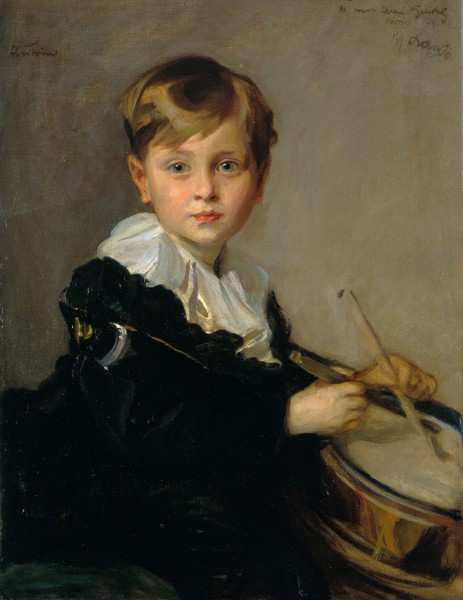
Portrait of Henri as a child, by Philip de László, 1911

Henri was born in 8th arrondissement of Paris on 17 June 1907. He was the eldest son of Armand de Gramont, 12th Duke of Gramont (1879–1962), and the former Countess Élaine Greffulhe. Among his siblings were twins Count Henri-Armand de Gramont and Count Jean Armand de Gramont, Count Charles de Gramont, and Countess Corisande de Gramont. His twin brothers married sisters, Élisabeth and Ghislaine Meunier du Houssoy, daughters of publisher Robert Meunier du Houssoy.

His paternal grandparents were Agénor de Gramont, 11th Duke of Gramont and, his second wife, Baroness Marguerite de Rothschild (a daughter of Baron Mayer Carl von Rothschild, founder of the "Naples" branch of the Rothschild Family). His paternal aunt, Élisabeth de Gramont, was a writer who married the 8th Duke of Clermont-Tonnerre. His maternal grandparents were Count Henry Greffulhe and Princess Élisabeth de Riquet de Caraman-Chimay.

== Career ==
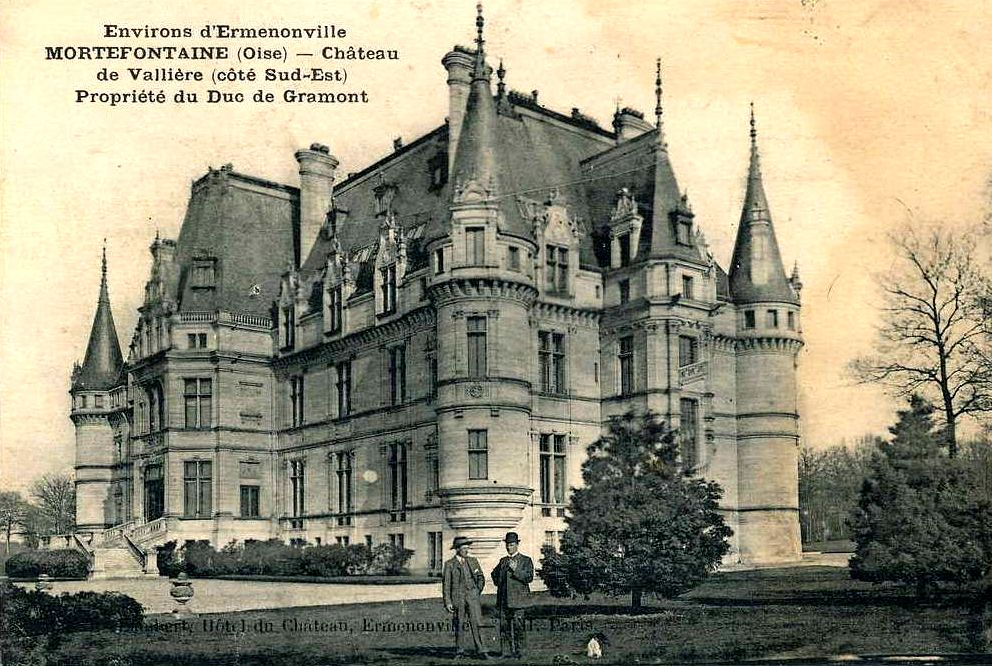
The main façade of the Château de Vallière, with the entrance facing northeast

From 1925 until 1962, as the eldest son of the Gramont family and heir presumptive to the title of Duke of Gramont, he used the courtesy title Duke of Guiche. Upon his father's death in 1962, he became the 13th Duke of Gramont. He was also known as the Prince of Bidache (the principality of Bidache maintained de jure sovereignty from 1570 until 1790 when, by royal edict, the territory of the principality was declared to be a part of France by Louis XVI, although his ancestor, Antoine de Gramont, wasn't ousted until 1793).

Following his father's death, he inherited the Château de Vallière, which had been built by his grandfather in the Grand Parc in Mortefontaine in 1894. Twenty years later, he sold the Château de Vallière and the Grand Parc in 1982 to Emir Mahdi Al Tajir, a billionaire Bahrana-Emirati businessman who served as Minister of Oil and the United Arab Emirates Ambassador to France from 1971 to 1908, while also serving as the United Arab Emirates Ambassador to United Kingdom from 1971 to 1987, where he bought Keir House. The Charlepont stud farm, the Circuit de Mortefontaine site and the woods outside the park remained owned by the Gramont family.

== Personal life ==
On 18 July 1949 at the Cathedral of Saint-Louis des Invalides in Paris, he married Odile Marguerite Marie Marthe Madelene Sublet d'Heudicourt de Lenoncourt (1914–1994), a daughter of Gérard Sublet d'Heudicourt de Lenoncourt and Thérèse Gautier Vignal (a daughter of Count Albert Gautier Vignal). Together, they were the parents of:

- Antoine de Gramont, 14th Duke of Gramont (1951–2014), who was engaged to Lydwine de La Rochefoucauld, daughter Alfred de La Rochefoucauld, Duke de La Roche-Guyon. Before they were able to wed, she was killed while they were visiting Mustang Island in Texas in 1975. He later married Cathérine Françoise Élisabeth Forget, a daughter of Jacques Forget and Madeleine Coulon, in 2003.

The Duke died at Les Lilas, a commune in the northern-eastern suburbs of Paris, on 12 December 1995.

=== Descendants ===
Through his eldest son Antoine, he was a grandfather of Antoine de Gramont, 15th Duke of Gramont (b. 2008).

French nobility
Preceded by Armand Antoine Agénor de Gramont	Duke of Gramont; 1962–1995	Succeeded by Antoine de Gramont
