= Armand de Gramont, 12th Duke of Gramont =

Armand de Gramont
- Duke of Gramont; Duke of Guiche, Prince of Bidache
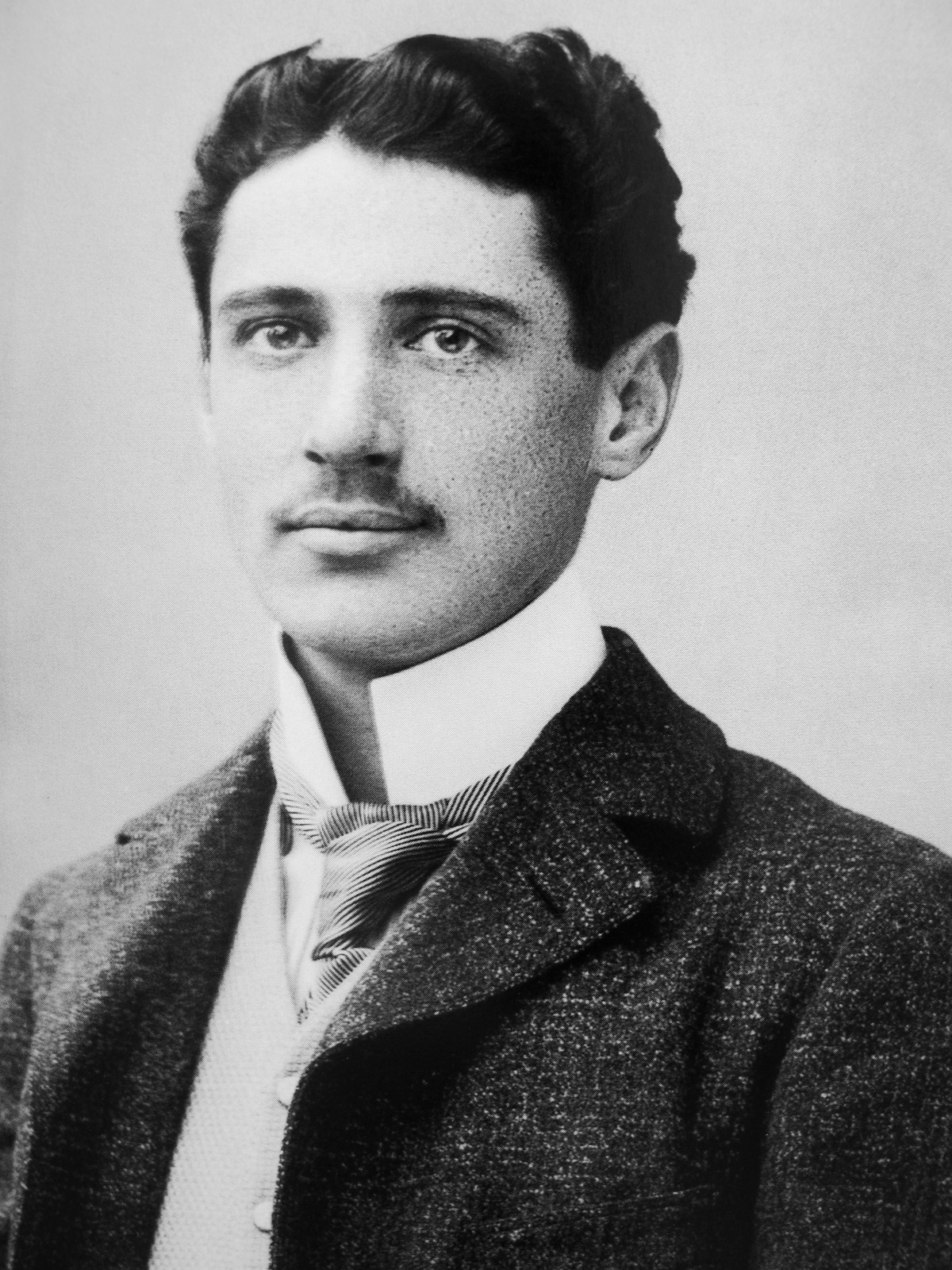
- Photograph of the Duke, by Paul Nadar, 1900
- Born: Armand Antoine Agénor de Gramont; 29 September 1879; Paris
- Died: 2 August 1962 (aged 82); Château de Vallière, Mortefontaine
- Spouse: Élaine Greffulhe (m. 1904; died 1958)
- Issue: Henri de Gramont, 13th Duke of Gramont; Count Henri Armand de Gramont; Count Jean de Gramont; Count Charles de Gramont; Baroness Philipp von Günzburg
- House: Gramont
- Father: Agénor de Gramont, 11th Duke of Gramont
- Mother: Marguerite de Rothschild

Armand Antoine Agénor de Gramont, 12th Duke of Gramont (29 September 1879 – 2 August 1962) was a French nobleman, scientist and industrialist. He was known by the courtesy title of Duke of Guiche until 1925, when he succeeded his father as Duc de Gramont.

== Early life ==
Armand was born in Paris on 29 September 1879. He was the eldest son of Antoine Alfred Agénor de Gramont, 11th Duke of Gramont and, his second wife, Baroness Marguerite de Rothschild. From his father's first marriage to Princess Isabelle de Beauvau-Craon, he had an elder half-sister, Élisabeth de Gramont, a writer who married the 8th Duke of Clermont-Tonnerre, in 1896. After his mother's death in 1905, his father married Princess Maria Ruspoli, with whom he had two more sons.

His paternal grandparents were Agénor de Gramont, 10th Duke of Gramont, and Emma Mary Mackinnon (a daughter of William Alexander Mackinnon, 33rd Chief of the Scottish Clan Mackinnon). His maternal grandparents were Louise von Rothschild and Baron Mayer Carl von Rothschild (founder of the "Naples" branch of the Rothschild Family).

== Career ==
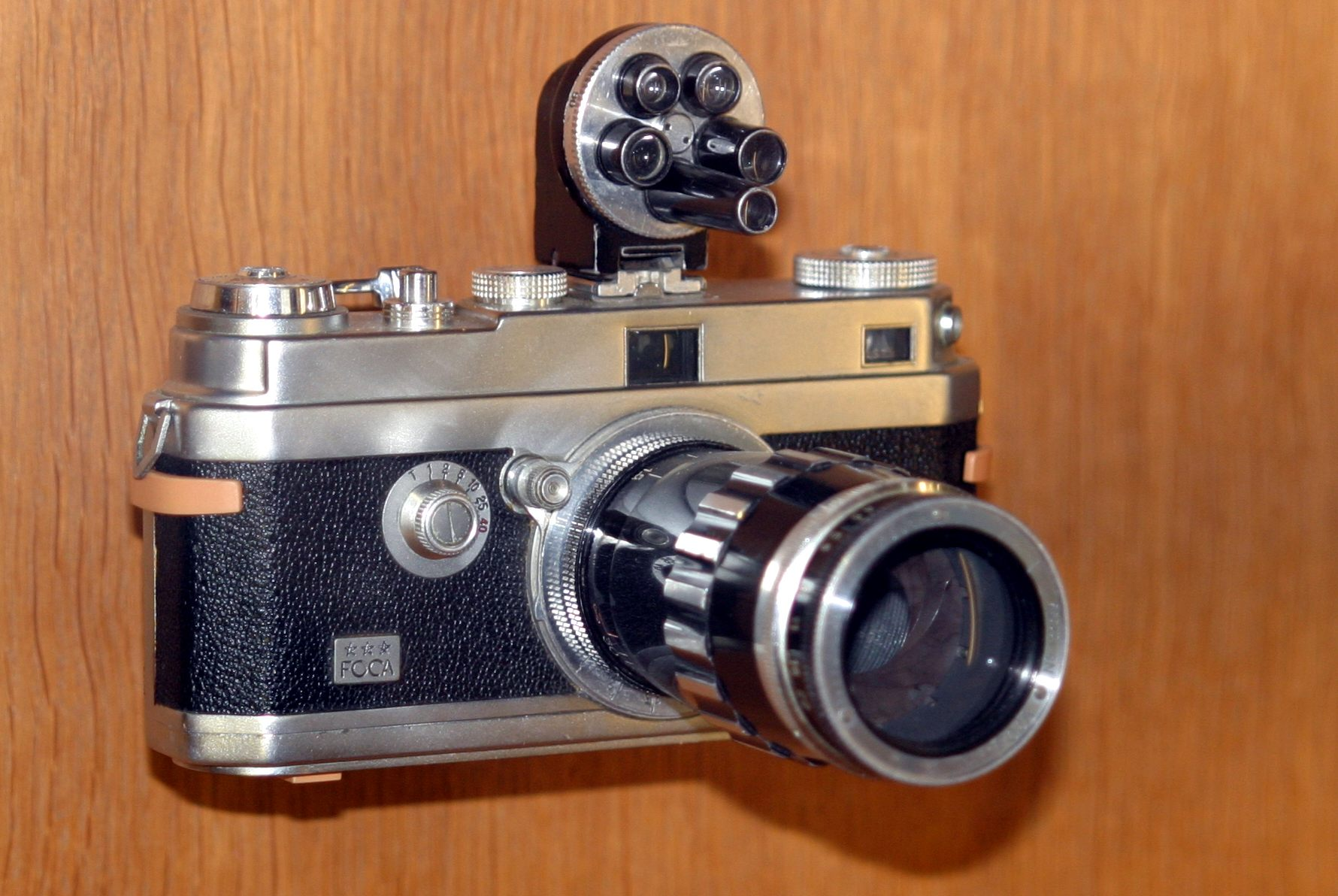
A Foca PF3L with 135 mm lens and universal viewfinder (1945)

In 1908, on the advice of Professor Carlo Bourlet, he established a laboratory for aerodynamic experiments in the garden of a retirement home founded by his parents-in-law in Levallois. In 1911, he defended his thesis for the doctorate in science at the Paris-Saclay Faculty of Sciences, entitled Essai d'aérodynamique du plan, the first thesis devoted to this subject in France. He then won the Fourneyron Prize from the French Academy of Sciences with Gustave Eiffel.

During World War I, Gramont was a motorist interpreter with the British Army Corps, then an aviator in the Technical Section of Aeronautics where he met the scientist Henri Chrétien. In March 1916, the Aviation Manufacturing Service of the Ministry of War asked Gramont to transform his aerodynamics laboratory into a workshop for manufacturing optical devices, particularly collimator sights. He observed the inadequacy of the French Army's equipment in precision optical instruments and the absence of engineers capable of developing them. He then headed a committee in favor of the creation of an institute of applied optics responsible for training a corps of optical engineers. Although the decision in principle was taken by the Government in 1916, the Institute of Theoretical and Applied Optics (SupOptique), which he chaired until his death, did not begin its activities until 1920. His daughter Corisande was a student engineer there.

As an industrialist, with the ambition of competing with German production, he founded in 1919 and managed the company Optique & Précision de Levallois (OPL), which took over from the optical device manufacturing workshop. Its headquarters were located at the same location, 86, Rue Chaptal in Levallois-Perret. The army was its main customer until World War II. In 1938, Armand de Gramont, wanting to diversify OPL's production towards the civilian world, had a factory built at Châteaudun in Eure-et-Loir. The company then produced famous cameras under the Foca brand.

== Personal life ==
Wedding of Élaine and the Duke of Guiche in Paris at the La Madeleine Church in 1904

On 14 November 1904, he married Élaine Greffulhe, the daughter of Count Greffulhe and his wife, Élisabeth de Riquet de Caraman-Chimay (said to be a model for the Duchess of Guermantes in Marcel Proust’s novel, À la recherche du temps perdu). Together, they had five children:

- Antoine Agénor Henri Armand de Gramont, 13th Duke of Gramont (1907–1995), who married Odile Sublet d'Heudicourt de Lenoncourt, a granddaughter of the Marquis d'Heudicourt de Lenoncourt and of Count Albert Gautier Vignal, in 1949.
- Henri Armand Antoine de Gramont (1909–1994), styled Count of Gramont, who married Élisabeth Meunier du Houssoy, a daughter of Robert Meunier du Houssoy, in 1939.
- Jean Armand Antoine de Gramont (1909–1984), styled Count of Gramont, who married Ghislaine Meunier du Houssoy, a daughter of Robert Meunier du Houssoy, in 1941.
- Charles Louis Antoine Armand de Gramont (1911–1976), styled Count of Gramont, who married Shermine Baras.
- Corisande Marguerite Élisabeth de Gramont (1920–1980), who married Count Jean-Louis de Maigret in 1945. They divorced and she married Baron Philipp von Günzburg, son of Baron Pierre von Günzburg, in 1952.

A rare film clip shows Proust (in bowler hat and grey coat) at Gramont's wedding in 1904. Proust’s wedding gift to Gramont was apparently a revolver in a leather case inscribed with verses from the bride’s childhood poems.

The Duke died at his Château de Vallière, in Mortefontaine, north of Paris, on 2 August 1962.

=== Descendants ===
Through his eldest son Henri, he was a grandfather of Antoine de Gramont, 14th Duke of Gramont, himself the father of Antoine, 15th Duke of Gramont.

== Gallery ==
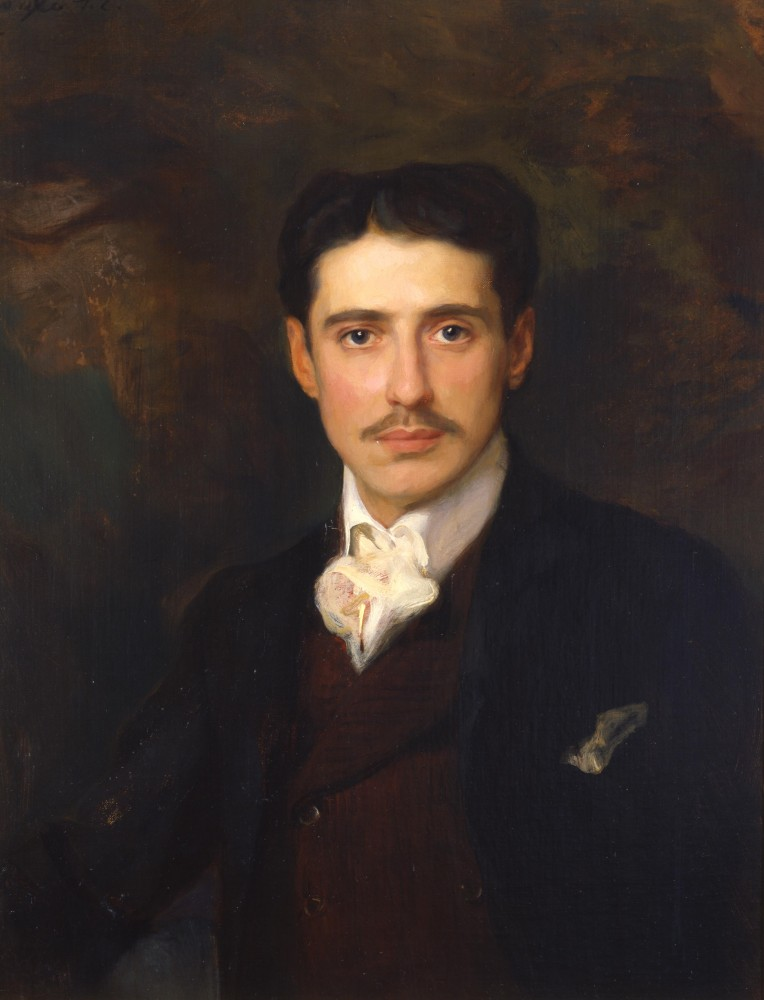
Portrait of the Duke by Philip de László, 1904

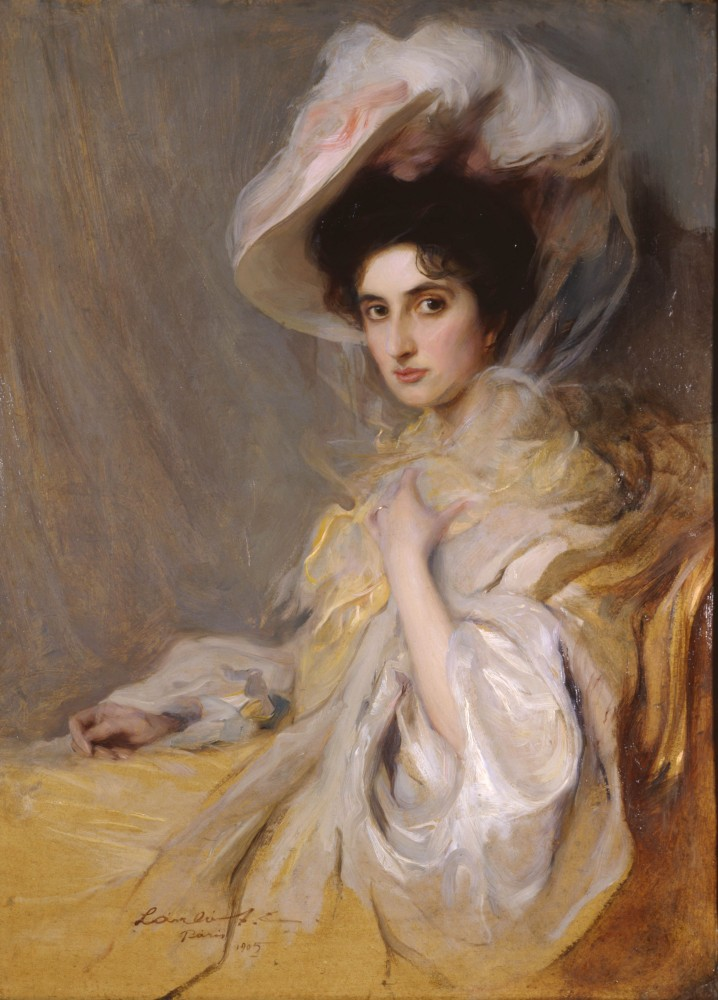
Portrait of his wife, Élaine, by Philip de László, 1905

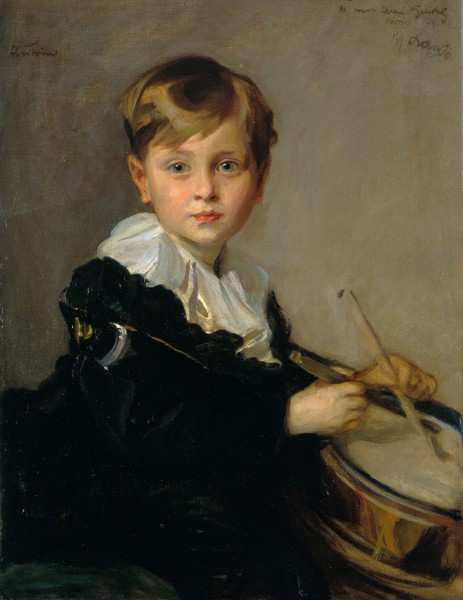
His eldest son, Henri, 1911

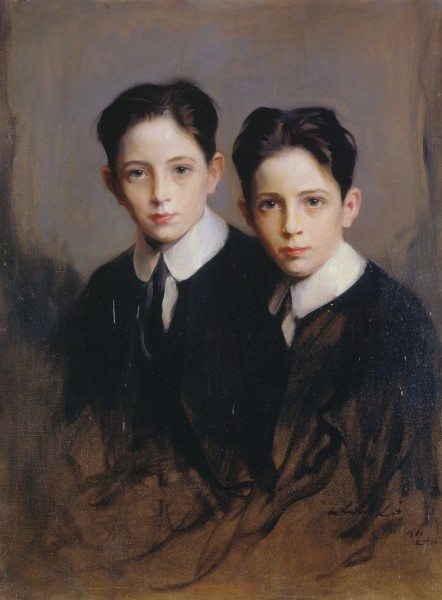
His twin sons, Count Henri and Count Jean, 1921

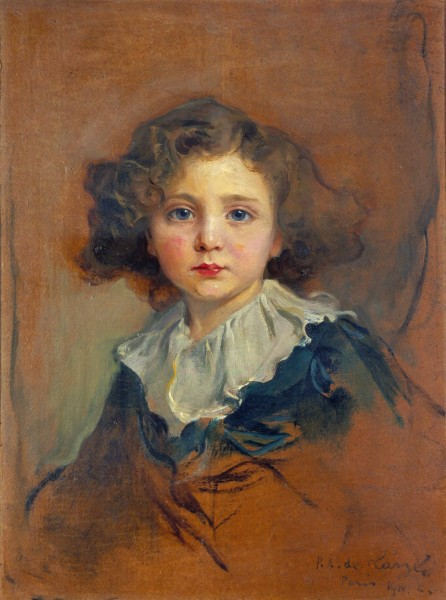
His youngest son, Count Charles, 1914

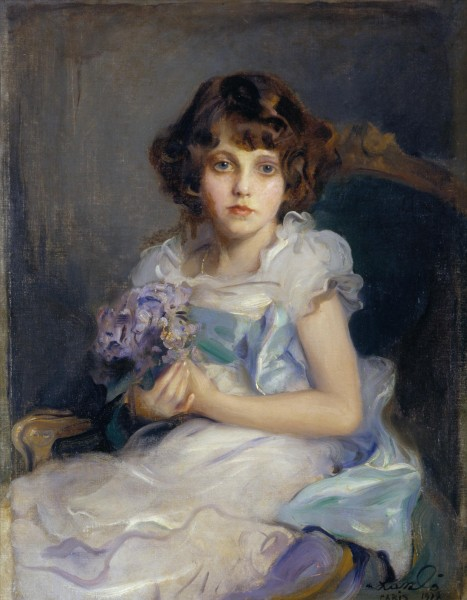
His only daughter, Corisande, 1928

French nobility
Preceded by Antoine Alfred Agénor de Gramont	Duke of Gramont; 1925–1962	Succeeded by Antoine Agénor Henri Armand de Gramont
