= Château de Vallière =

19th-century château in France

Coordinates: 49.123°N 2.612°E

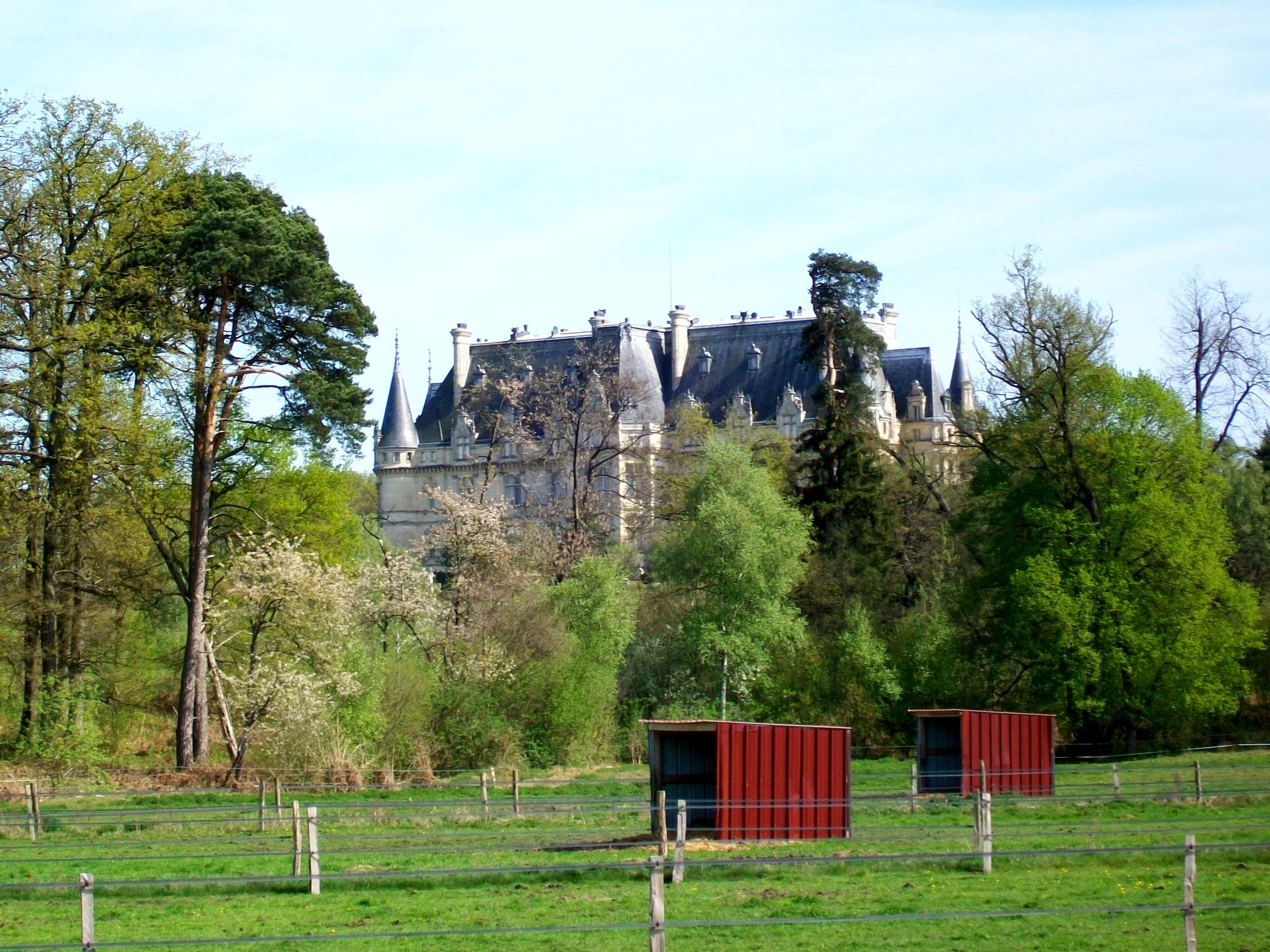
Château de Vallière, 2011

The Château de Vallière is a 19th-century château in Mortefontaine, in the Oise département, in the Hauts-de-France region. The park is partly located in the commune of Fontaine-Chaalis. Built in 1894 in neo-Gothic style for the Duke of Gramont, its facades and roofs are listed in the supplementary inventory of historical monuments by decree of 29 October 1975. The park, located on the edge of the Ermenonville Forest, has been a listed site since 10 April 1961. The château is now owned by the Emirati businessman Mahdi Al Tajir.

== History ==
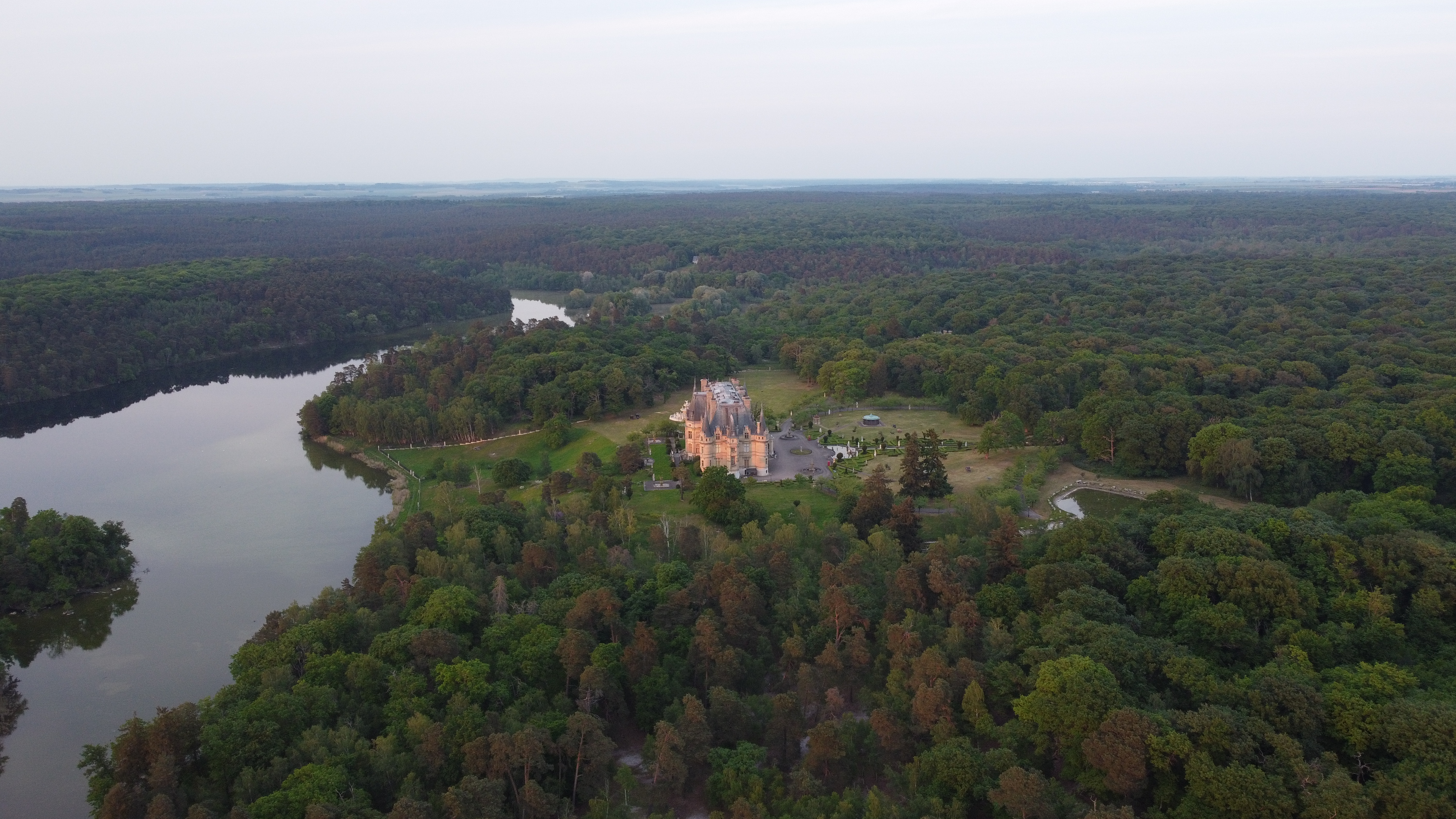
Aerial view from the southwest

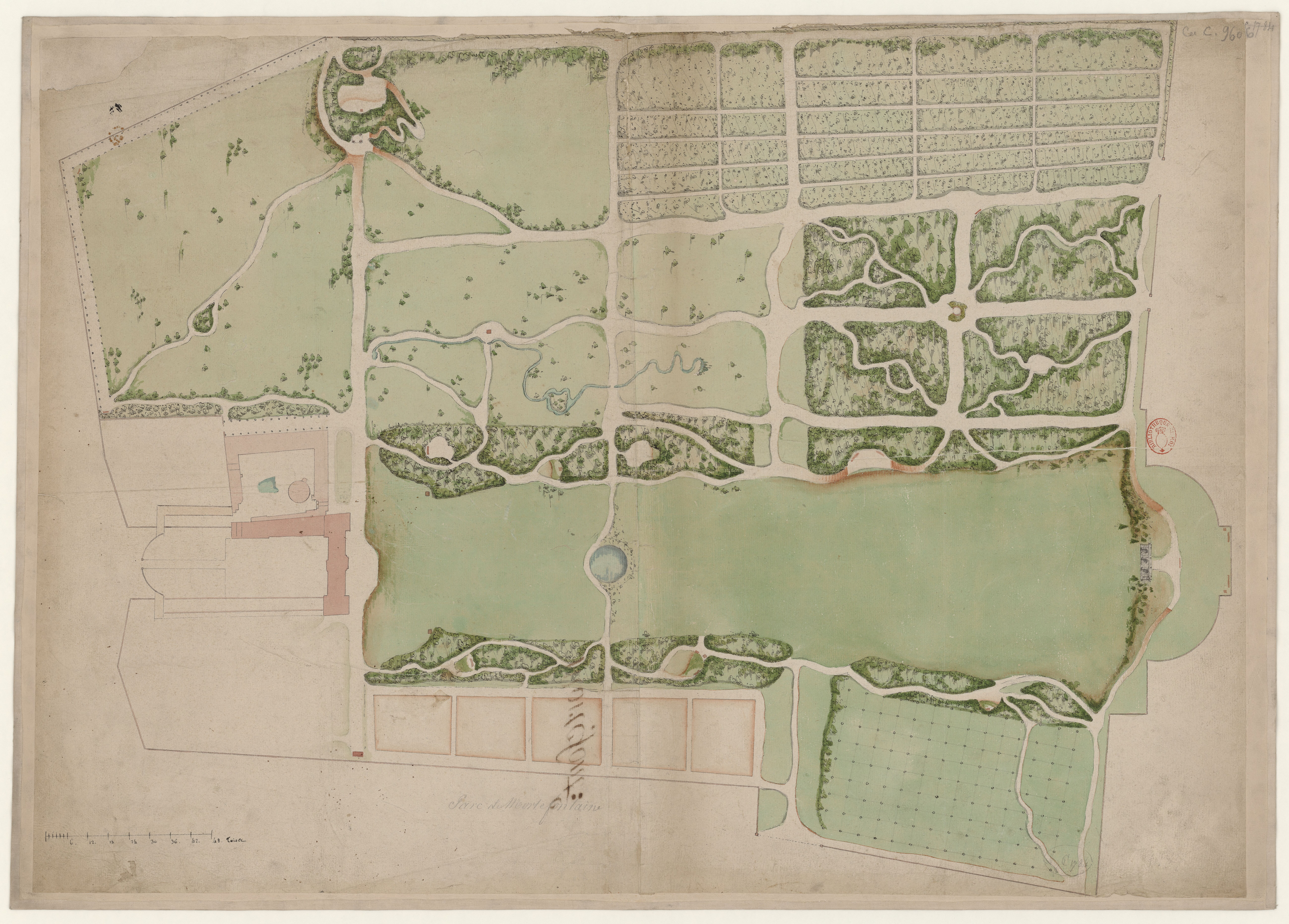
Plan of the Parc de Mortefontaine, 1780

In October 1798, Joseph Bonaparte (the older brother of Napoleon I) acquired the vast Mortefontaine and Montmélian estates, including the Château de Mortefontaine. Bonaparte had the Grand Parc completed between 1808 and 1814, organized around four ponds which were painted by Antoine Watteau and Camille Corot. Before his additions, only the Petit Parc existed, which was not part of the Vallière estate. The Château de Mortefontaine was the site of the signing of the Convention of 1800 (also known as the Treaty of Mortefontaine), a treaty of friendship between France and the United States of America. The preliminaries of the 1802 Peace of Amiens were also negotiated at the château.

Bonaparte, who was the King of Naples from 1806 to 1808 and King of Spain and the Indies from 1808 to 1813, owned the estate until 1814, when he went into exile, bequeathing the Mortefontaine estate to his administrator, Madame de Villeneuve, by a fictitious sale. She rented most of the estate to the Prussian Baron Georg-Arthur von Schickler, who had wanted to purchase it.

=== Prince of Condé ===
In 1829 Louis Henri de Bourbon, the last Prince of Condé, and already owner of the Château de Chantilly, bought the estate. After his death, his mistress Sophie Dawes, Baronne de Feuchères, received the estate as a gift in 1837. Only three years later, her ten-year old goddaughter Sophie Thanaron (the daughter of her sister Charlotte and a retired French officer), inherited the estate following the 1840 death of the Baroness. She married the Prefect of Aisne Henri Corbin (d. 1879). In 1892, the Corbin family sold 3,800 acres (1,500 ha) of land, the largest part of the Mortefontaine and Montmélian estate, to Agénor de Gramont, 11th Duke of Gramont, which became the Vallière estate. The Corbin family kept the Château de Mortefontaine and the woods on the Montmélian hill. Sophie Thanaron Corbin died in 1901. The château and the Petit Parc remained the property of her children until 1928.

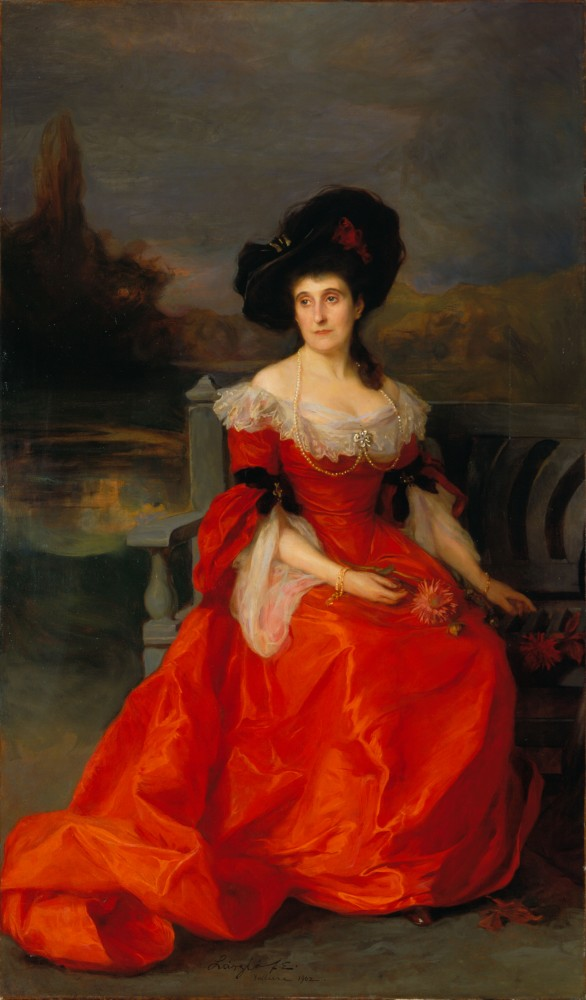
Portrait of Marguerite, Duchess of Gramont, by Philip de László, 1902

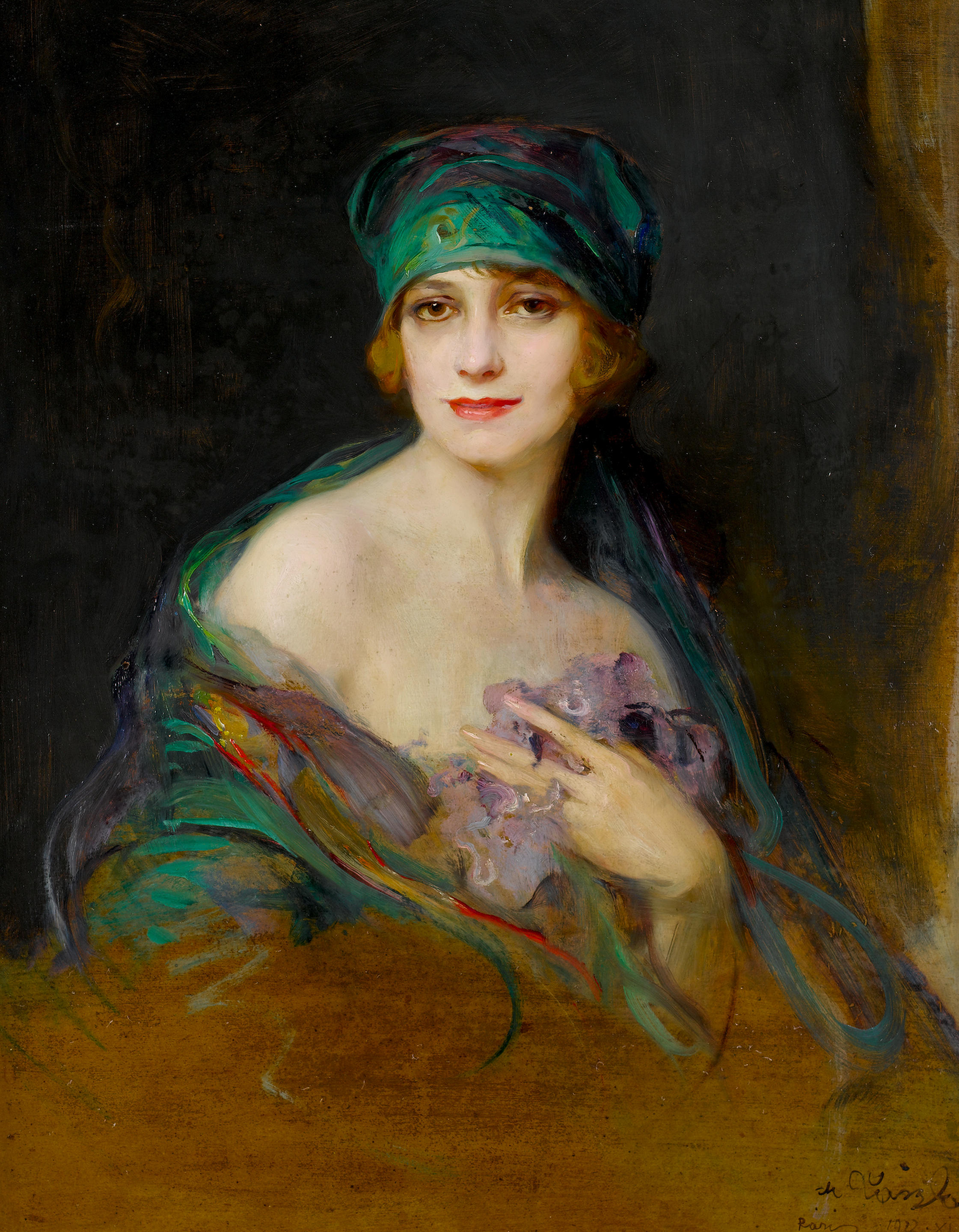
Princess Marie Ruspoli, Duchess de Gramont, also by Philip de László, 1922

=== Dukes of Gramont ===
After acquiring the estate in 1892, the 11th Duke of Gramont had architect Alfred-Philibert Aldrophe build the Château de Vallière in 1894, for his wife, Marguerite, Duchess of Gramont (née Baroness Marguerite de Rothschild; a younger daughter of Baron Mayer Carl von Rothschild, the first Jewish member of the House of Lords of Prussia), in the Grand Parc of the Mortefontaine and Montmélian estate. The château is near Thorn Lake (French: Lac de l'Épine), the largest of the four ponds, and Molton Island.

At Vallière the Duke organized pheasant, duck and deer hunts while the Duchess had plays by Eugène Labiche and tableaux vivants performed. The Duke set up an omnibus service between the station and the château, comprising sixteen grey horses harnessed in groups of five and led by postilions wearing top hats. The Duke and Duchess's eldest son, Armand de Gramont, then Duke of Guiche, married the Countess Élaine Greffulhe at the estate in 1904. The Duke of Guiche's friend, Marcel Proust, dined with the family at Vallière's terrace on 14 July 1904, who noted that he could see the towers of Senlis Cathedral above the ponds and the foliage. After Duchess Marguerite died in 1905, (Note: From the Duke's first marriage to Princess Isabelle de Beauvau-Craon, he was the father of Élisabeth de Gramont (1875–1954), known as the "Red Duchess", who married Philibert, Duke of Clermont-Tonnerre, but had a long-term lesbian relationship with the American writer Natalie Clifford Barney.) the Duke married Princess Maria Ruspoli.

On 2 September 1914 an advance guard of 4 battalions of the 3rd Infantry Division crossed the Ermenonville Forest and slipped, at nightfall, into the park of the Château de Vallière, where they encountered the rearguard of the 56th Reserve Division, composed of the 354th Infantry Regiment and the 69th Battalion of Foot Chasseurs. During the capture of the village of Mortefontaine, the Pomeranians of the 2nd and 9th Grenadiers, two were killed and thirty wounded. The "Battle of Mortefontaine" is considered the closest battle to Paris and the "extreme point of the enemy advance". There is a small monument at the château which honors the memory of soldiers of the 354th Regiment who died for France during the battle.

After his father's death in 1925, Armand de Gramont became the 12th Duke of Gramont. He was succeeded by his son, Henri as the 13th Duke in 1962. In 1982, twenty years later, he sold the Château de Vallière and the Grand Parc outside of the de Gramont family.

=== Present day ===
Today, the Château de Vallière and Vallière Park are owned by Emir Mahdi Al Tajir, a billionaire Bahrana-Emirati businessman who served as Minister of Oil and the United Arab Emirates Ambassador to France from 1971 to 1908, while also serving as the United Arab Emirates Ambassador to United Kingdom from 1971 to 1987, where he bought Keir House. The Charlepont stud farm, the Circuit de Mortefontaine site and the woods outside the park are still owned by the heirs of the de Gramont family, the Cossé-Brissac family. They sold the western sector of the park, to the west and south, to Rousselet.

== Architecture ==
The exterior of the château is conventional yet eclectic, in line with the tastes of the bourgeoisie in the second half of the 19th century. The château has a neo-Gothic silhouette with Renaissance-style façades, bays, roofs and chimneys inspired by the châteaux of the Loire Valley, particularly for the four corner towers of the Château d'Azay-le-Rideau.

The château has exceptionally thick thirteen meter walls. There is a chapel and a theatre inside. It has thirty rooms, each with its own bathroom. The reception rooms are lit by zenithal light from central glass roofs over the terrace. The furniture includes a 17th century tapestry with the Gramont and Guiche coat of arms in the dining room, various family portraits, including by Giovanni Boldini and Philip de László, and cloisonné furniture and objects from the looting of the Old Summer Palace in Beijing.

== Gallery ==
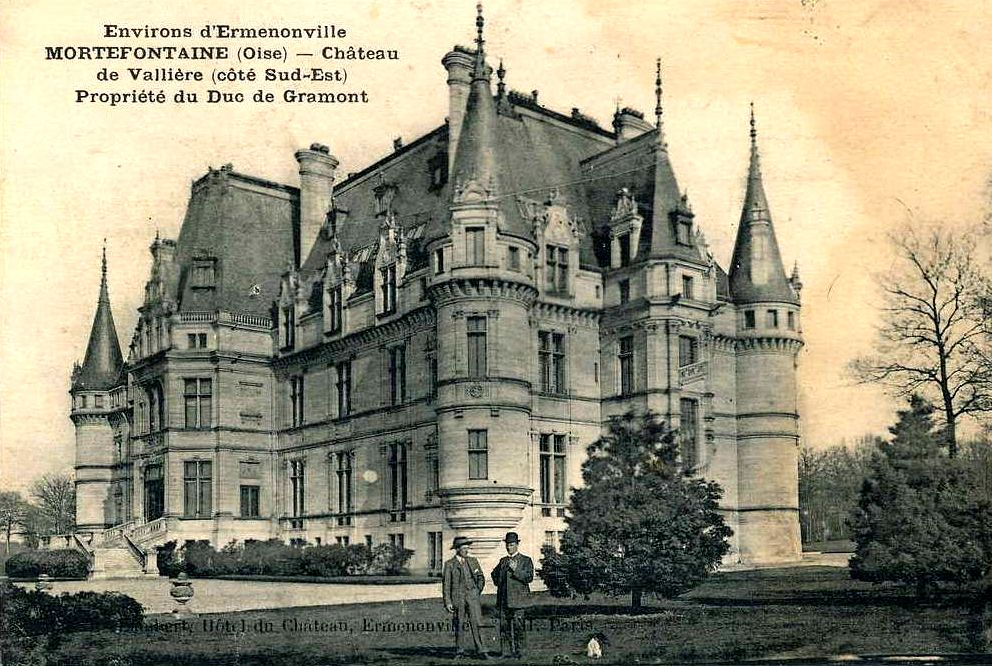
The main façade of the Château de Vallière, with the entrance facing northeast.

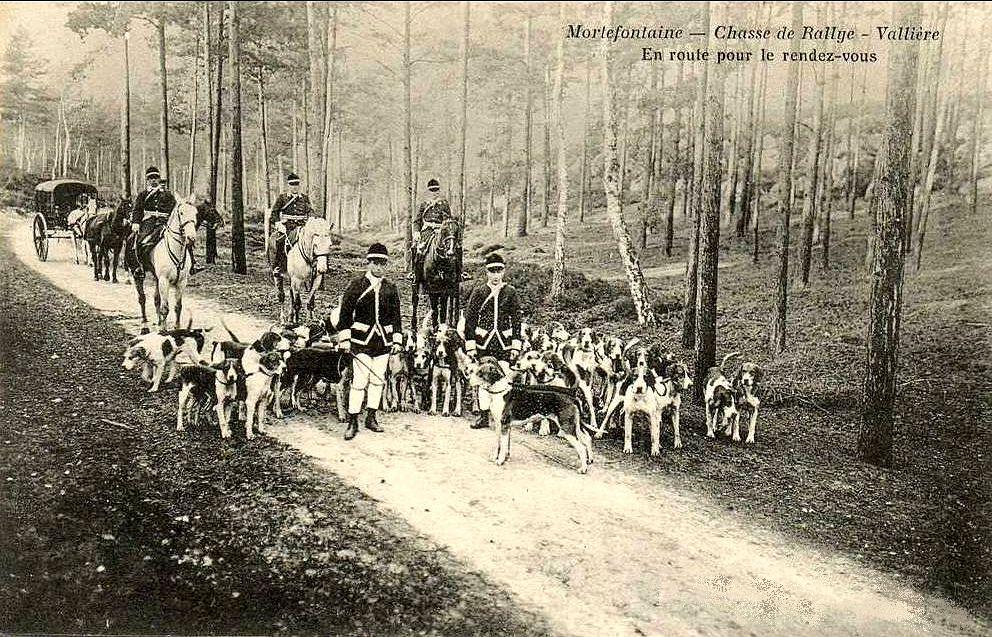
The Vallière estate was primarily used as a hunting ground for its owners.

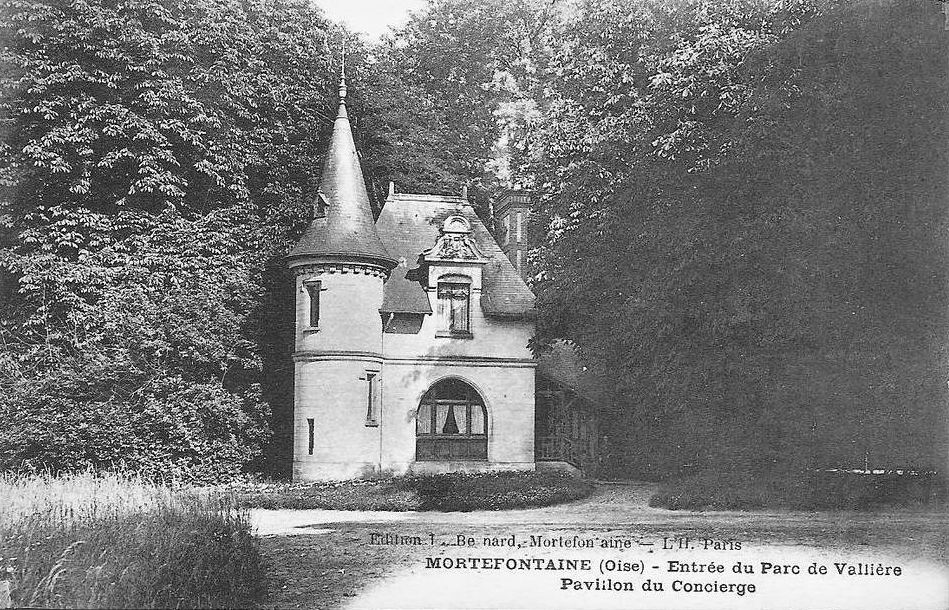
The Hôtel d'Ormesson, the concierge's pavilion near the main gate at the entrance to the Grand Parc.

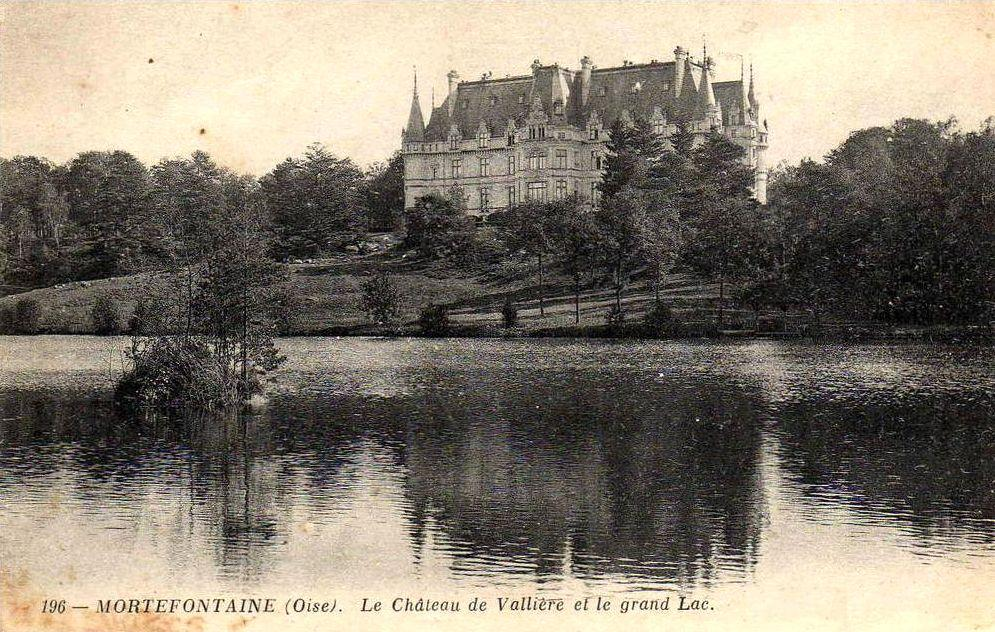
The Château de Vallière with the Épine pond in the foreground.

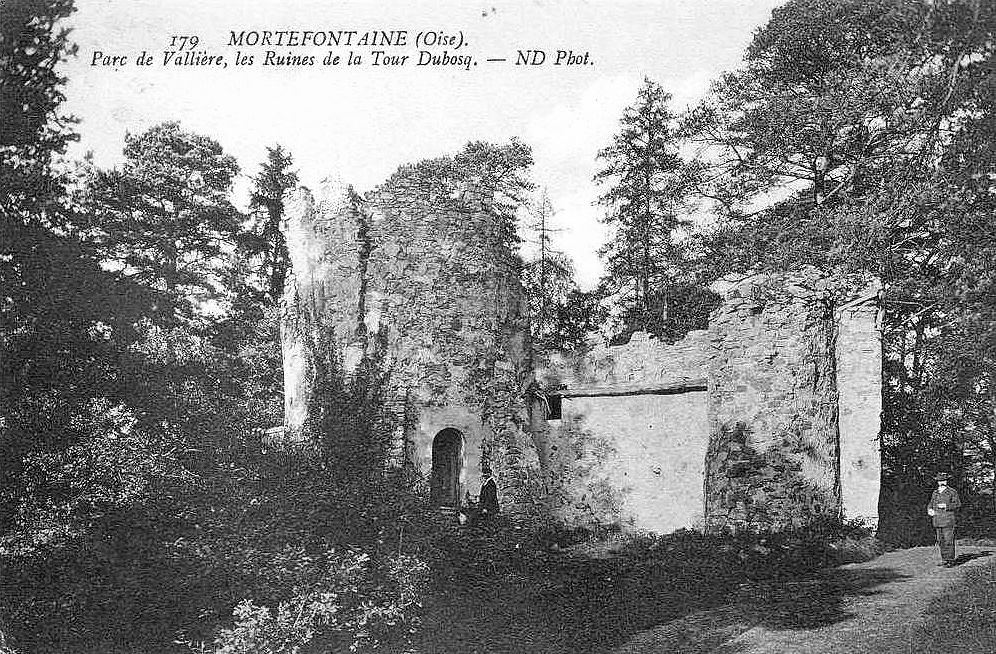
The Dubosq Tower, a false ruin, which serves as a belvedere.

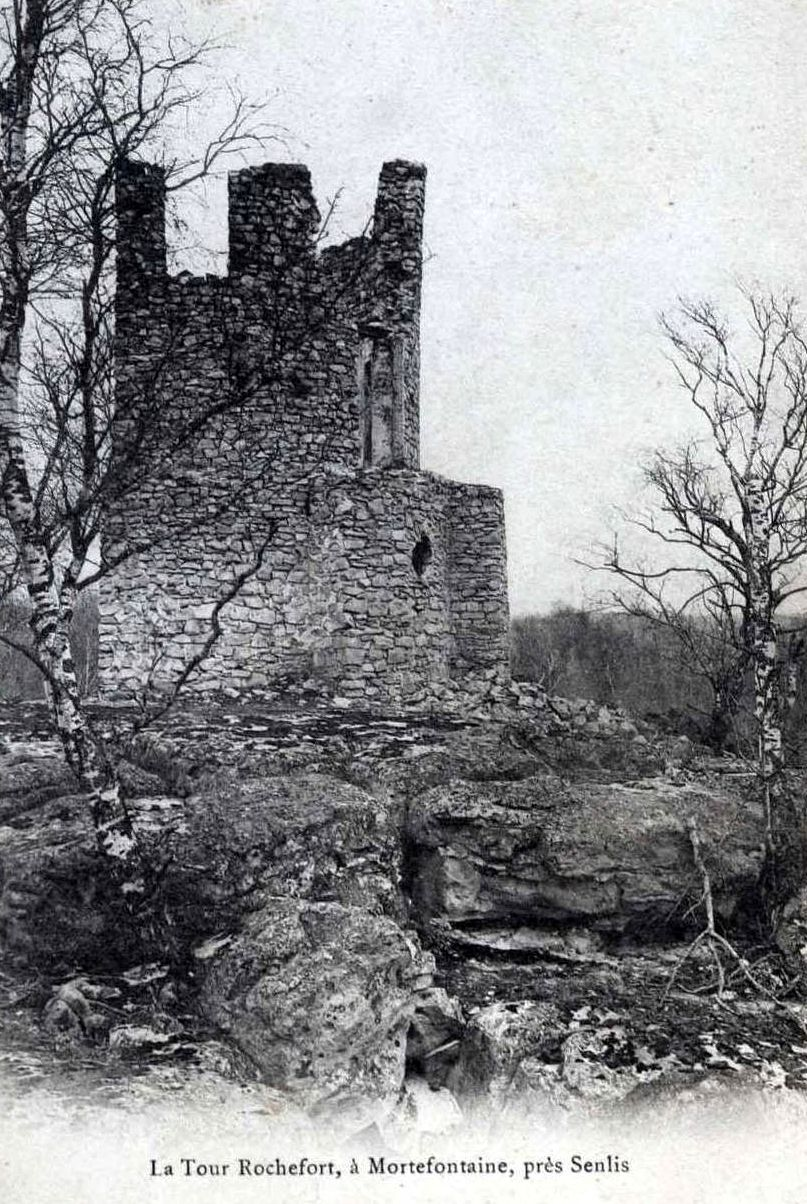
The Rochefort Tower, also a false ruin, on the Vallière estate, outside the current park.

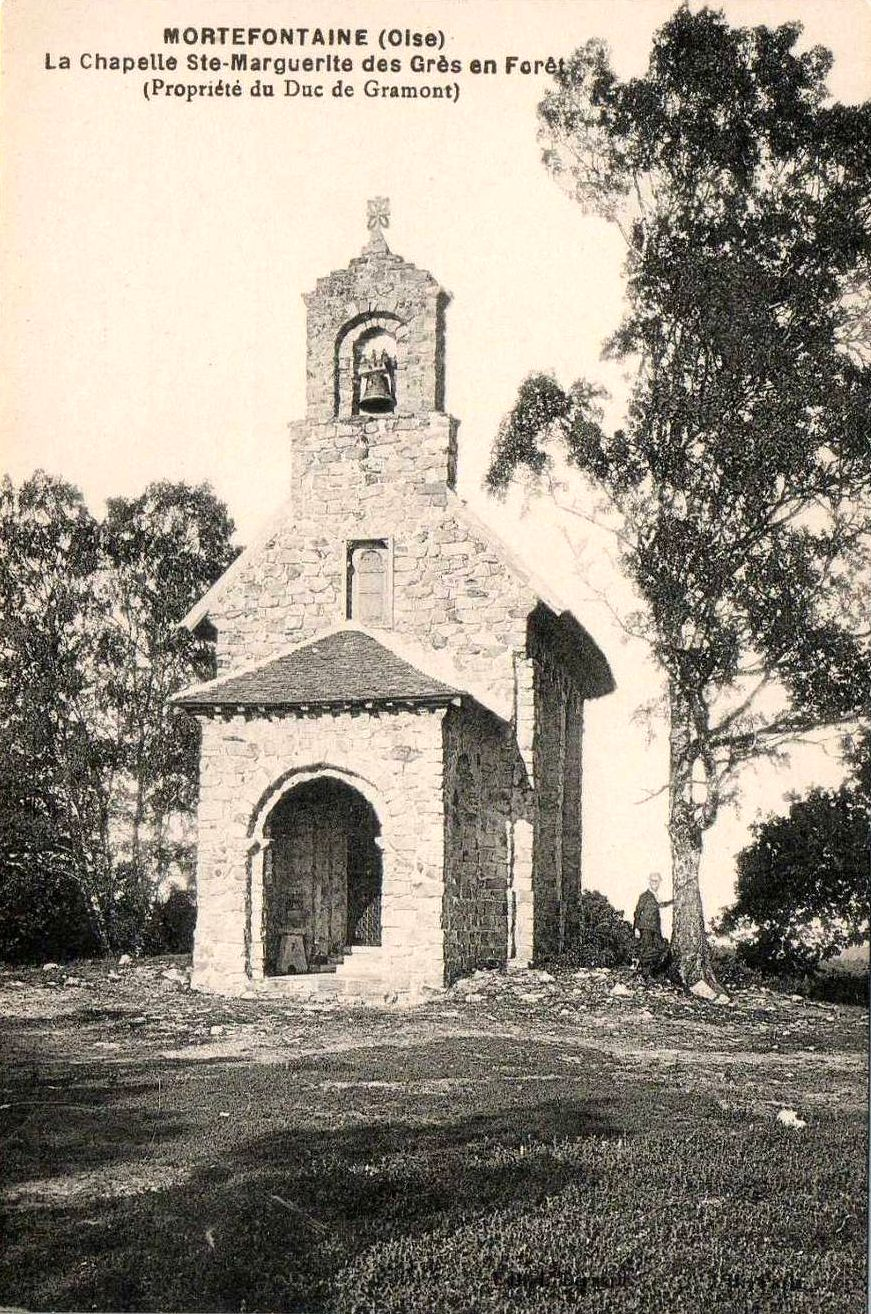
The Sainte-Marguerite-des Grès chapel, c. 1852, which replaced a Romanesque pilgrimage chapel.

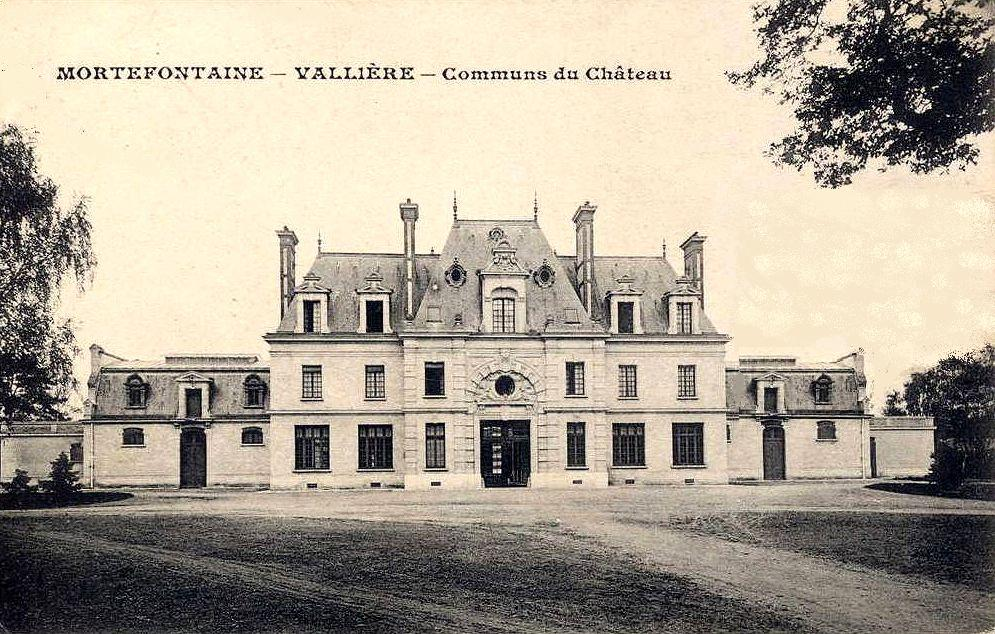
An outbuilding of the château, built for the Duke of Gramont, located 200m to the east of the château.

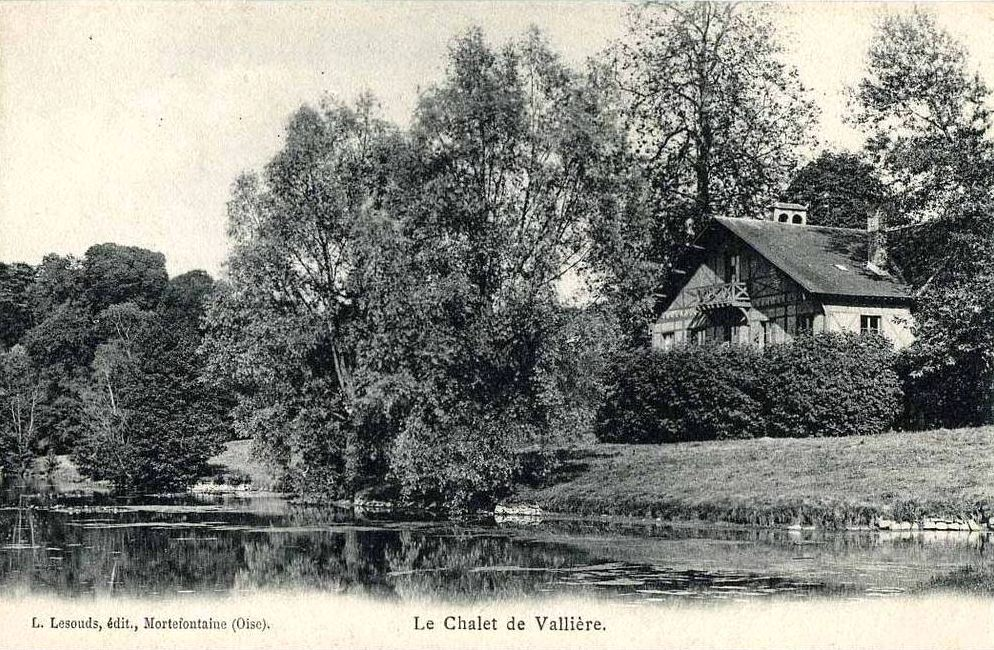
The Salon de Vallière (also known as the Châlet) was built under Bonaparte and is located on a dyke between the Vallière and Épine ponds.

== See also ==
- Rothschild family residences
