= Agénor de Gramont, 11th Duke of Gramont =

Agénor de Gramont
- Duke of Gramont; Duke of Guiche, Prince of Bidache
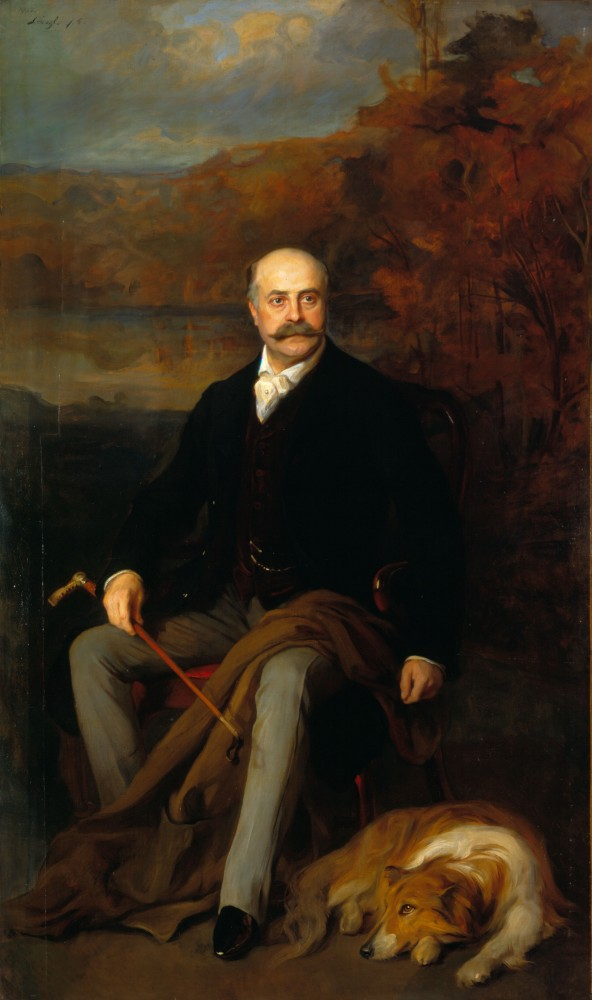
- Portrait of Gramont, by Philip de László, 1902
- Born: Antoine Alfred Agénor de Gramont; 22 September 1851; Paris, France
- Died: 30 January 1925 (aged 73); Paris, France
- Spouse: Princess Isabelle de Beauvau-Craon (m. 1874; died 1875) Baroness Marguerite de Rothschild (m. 1878; died 1905) Princess Maria Ruspoli (m. 1907; died 1925)
- Issue: Élisabeth, Duchess of Clermont-Tonnerre; Armand de Gramont, 12th Duke of Gramont; Corisande, Marquise de Noailles; Louis-René, Count of Gramont; Gabriel, Count of Gramont; Gratien, Count of Gramont
- House: Gramont
- Father: Agénor de Gramont, 10th Duke of Gramont
- Mother: Emma Mary Mackinnon

Antoine Alfred Agénor de Gramont, 11th Duke of Gramont (22 September 1851 – 30 January 1925), known as the Duke of Guiche from 1855 to 1880, was a French aristocrat, soldier and landowner.

== Early life ==
Gramont was born in Paris on 22 September 1851. He was the eldest son of Agénor de Gramont, 10th Duke of Gramont, and Emma Mary Mackinnon (1811–1891), a member of the Scottish nobility. His younger brothers were Armand de Gramont, Duke of Lesparre (who married Hélène Louise Eugénie Duchesne de Gillevoisin), and Antoine Albert de Gramont (who married Jeanne Marie Sabatier).

His paternal grandparents were Héraclius de Gramont, 9th Duke of Gramont and Anna-Quintina-Albertine Grimod, Countess d'Orsay (daughter of Albert Gaspard Grimod, Comte d'Orsay). His maternal grandparents were Emma Mary Palmer (the only daughter and heiress of writer Joseph Palmer of Rush House), and William Alexander Mackinnon, 33rd Chief of the Scottish Clan Mackinnon.

Gramont excelled in mathematics and graduated first from the École spéciale militaire de Saint-Cyr.

== Career ==
After attending the École, he entered the French cavalry and became a Second lieutenant in the 4th Hussars, a regiment in which he served during the Franco-Prussian War of 1870, during which time his father was France's Minister for Foreign Affairs. After France's defeat, his uncle, General Auguste de Gramont, Duke of Lesparre, refused to introduce him to the Jockey-Club de Paris as the son of the Minister of Foreign Affairs, who was blamed for the war of 1870.

From 1855 until 1880, as the eldest of the Gramont family and heir presumptive to the title of Duke of Gramont, he used the courtesy title Duke of Guiche. Upon his father's death in 1880, he became the 11th Duke of Gramont and left the army. He was also known as the Prince of Bidache (the principality of Bidache maintained de jure sovereignty from 1570 until 1790 when, by royal edict, the territory of the principality was declared to be a part of France by Louis XVI, although his ancestor, Antoine de Gramont, wasn't ousted until 1793).

From 1890 to 1895, he was general councilor of the canton of Bidache.

=== Residences ===
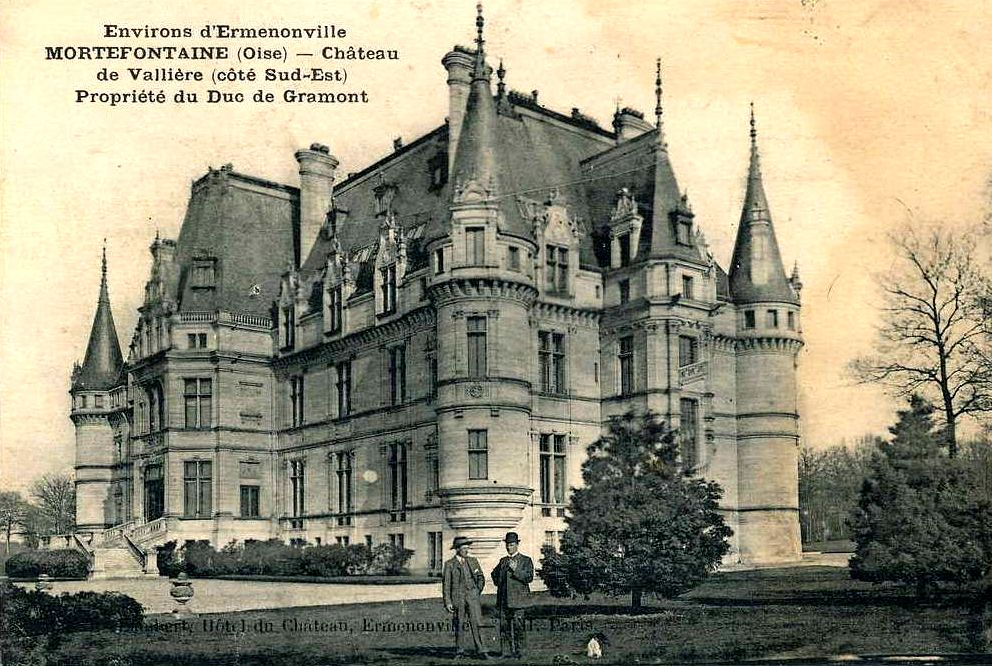
The main façade of the Château de Vallière, with the entrance facing northeast

For a period, he lived in Melun in Seine-et-Marne. In Paris, he lived in an apartment at 1 Rue François-Ier in the 8th arrondissement. In 1887, he acquired a hôtel particulier in the 7th arrondissement of Paris at 17 Rue de Constantine, on the corner of Rue Saint-Dominique near the Prince of Sagan's Hôtel de Monaco). He later had a hôtel particulier on the Rue de Chaillot (today known as the Rue Quentin-Bauchart) at the corner of Avenue des Champs-Élysées (now destroyed). In 1894, the Duke's hôtel in Paris was the site of Consuelo Vanderbilt's debut.

After becoming Duke, he resided at the Château de Mangé, in Verneil-le-Chétif in Sarthe, bequeathed by his father-in-law, the Prince of Beauvau, to his granddaughter, Élisabeth.

Upon marrying his second wife, who had inherited substantial property after the death of her father in 1886, the newly wealthy Duke decided to restore his family's former seat, the Château de Bidach. First, however, he bought the Château de Crénille in Chaumes-en-Brie in 1880, before having the Château de Vallière built in Mortefontaine in 1894 in the Grand Parc of the former the Mortefontaine estate.

== Personal life ==
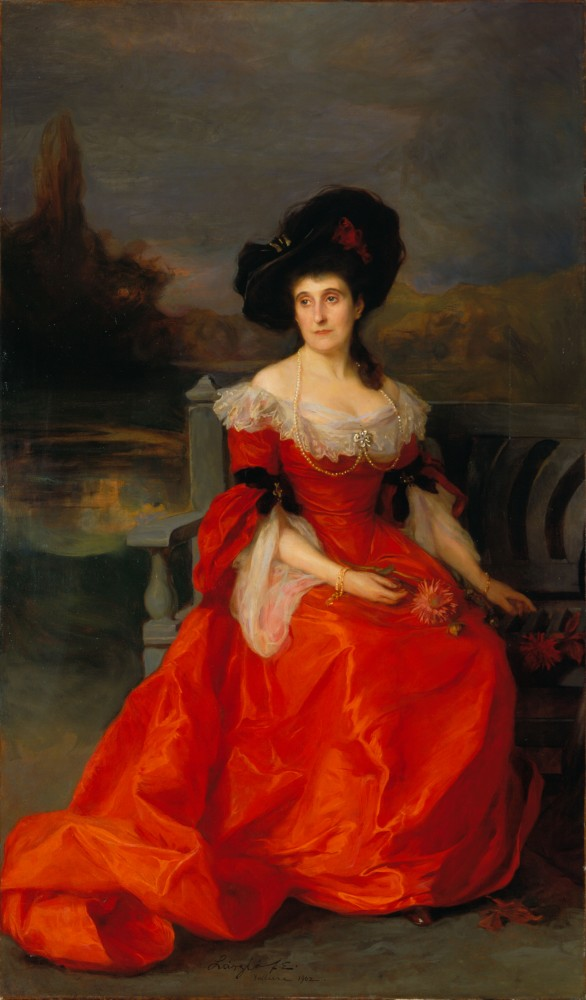
Portrait of his second wife, Baroness Marguerite, by Philip de László, 1902

The Duke was married three times during his lifetime. His first marriage, when he was styled Duke of Guiche, was on 20 April 1874 in Paris to Princess Isabelle Marie Blanche Charlotte Victurnienne de Beauvau-Craon (1852–1875), who reportedly gave up marrying the very rich Count de Gramont d'Aster to marry Agénor. Princess Isabelle was a daughter of Marc de Beauvau, 5th Prince of Beauvau (son of Charles Just de Beauvau, 4th Prince of Beauvau) and, his first wife, Marie d'Aubusson de La Feuillade. While married, they lived apart as the Duke was stationed in Melun and his Duchess lived with her parents in Nancy. She died of puerperal fever a few days after the birth of their only daughter:

- Antonia Corisande Élisabeth "Lily" de Gramont (1875–1954), a writer who married Philibert de Clermont-Tonnerre, 8th Duke of Clermont-Tonnerre, in 1896. They divorced in 1920.

=== Second marriage ===
The Duke remarried on 9 December 1878 in Paris to Marguerite, Countess de Liedekerke (née Baroness Marguerite de Rothschild) (1855–1905), a daughter of Louise von Rothschild and, her cousin, Baron Mayer Carl von Rothschild, founder of the "Naples" branch of the Rothschild Family. Marguerite had been disinherited by her father for converting to Catholicism to marry the Belgian Count de Liedekerke, a Catholic who died shortly thereafter in a hunting accident, but the disinheritance was annulled after her father's death in 1886. Before her death in 1905, they were the parents of three children:

- Antoine Agénor Armand de Gramont, 12th Duke of Gramont (1879–1962), married Countess Élaine Greffulhe, a daughter of Count Henry Greffulhe and Princess Élisabeth de Riquet de Caraman-Chimay, in 1904.
- Corisande Emma Louise Ida de Gramont (1880–1977), who married Hélie de Noailles, Marquis de Noailles, a younger son of Jules de Noailles, 7th Duke of Noailles, in 1901. The resided at the Château de Champlâtreux.
- Louis-René Alexandre de Gramont (1883–1963), styled Count of Gramont, who married Countess Marie Antoinette de Rochechouart de Mortemart, a daughter of Count René Marie Louis de Rochechouart de Mortemart and Elisabeth-Anne Marie Victorine de Riquet de Caraman (a daughter of Maurice de Riquet, 4th Duke of Caraman), in 1916.

=== Third marriage ===
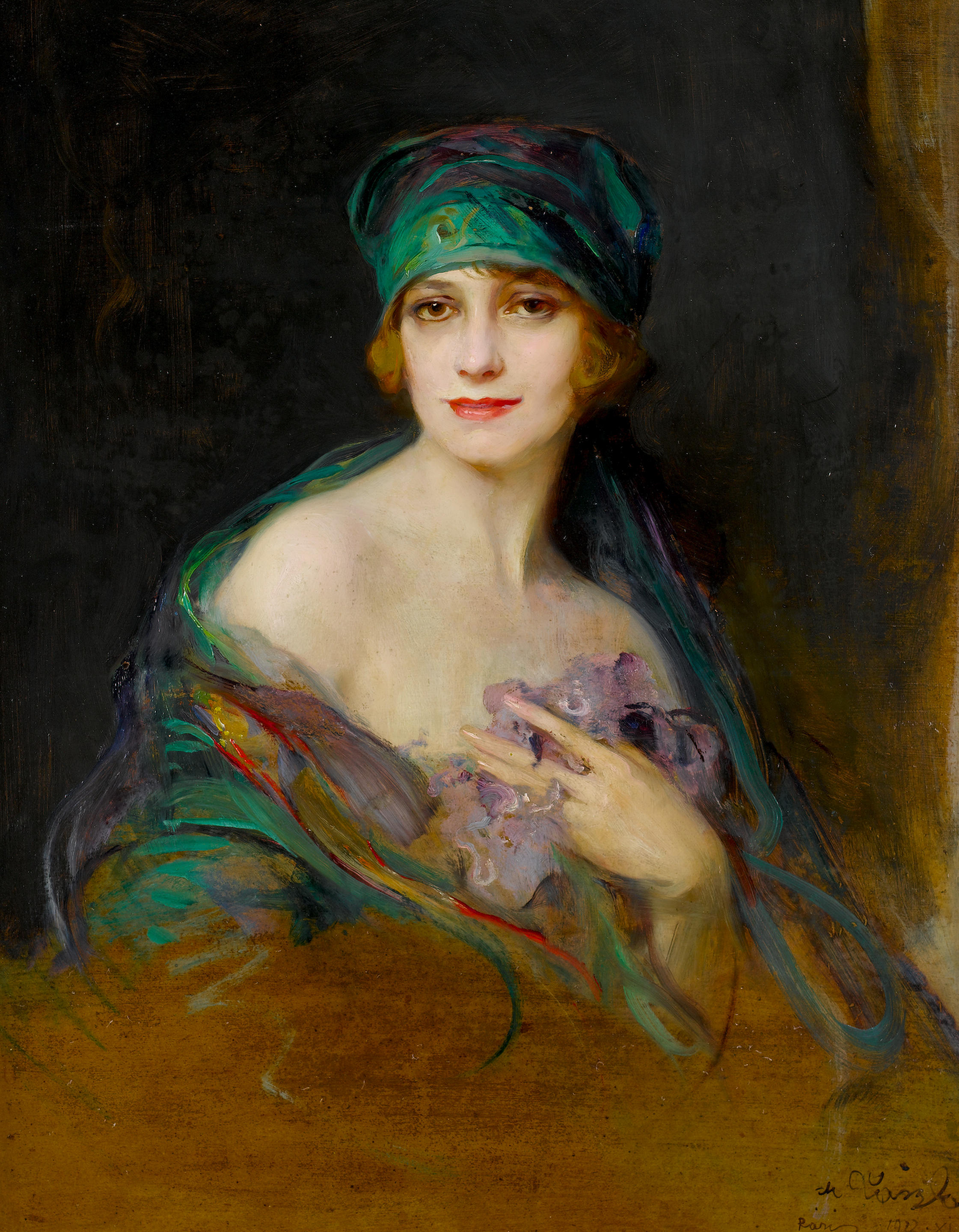
Portrait of his third wife, Princess Marie, also by Philip de László, 1922

Widowed a second time, he remarried in Paris on 31 July 1907 to Princess Maria Ruspoli (1888–1976), a daughter of Don Luigi, Prince Ruspoli, and Donna Clelia Balboni. Before his death in 1925, they were the parents of two children:

- Gabriel Antoine Armand de Gramont (1908–1943), styled Count of Gramont, a diplomat who married Marie-Hélène Negroponte, a daughter of Ioannis Negroponte and Eleni Stathatou and sister to Dimitri Negroponte, in 1931.
- Gratien Louis Antoine de Gramont (b. 1909), styled Count of Gramont.

The Duke died in Paris on 30 January 1925. After his death, his widow married François-Victor Hugo, a great-grandson of writer Victor Hugo, with whom she had a son, Giorgio Hugo (b. c. 1935). She died in Aix-en-Provence on 6 August 1976.

=== Descendants ===
Through his eldest daughter, he was a grandfather of Béatrix de Clermont Tonnerre (who married André Gault) and Diane de Clermont Tonnerre (who married Count Guy de Berlaymont).

Through his daughter Corisande, he was a grandfather of François de Noailles, 9th Duke of Noailles (1905–2009), who married Charlotte de Caumont La Force.

Through his son Gabriel, he was a grandfather of Pulitzer Prize winning writer Ted Morgan (1932–2023), who was born Count Sanche Charles Armand Gabriel de Gramont. He became an American citizen in 1977, renouncing his titles of nobility, and adopting the name, "Ted Morgan", as a U.S. citizen, which is an anagram of "de Gramont".

== Gallery ==
The Duke commissioned a number of portraits by Philip de László, the Anglo-Hungarian painter known for his portraits of royal and aristocratic personages. The Gramont family was considered de László's "greatest friends and patrons in Europe".

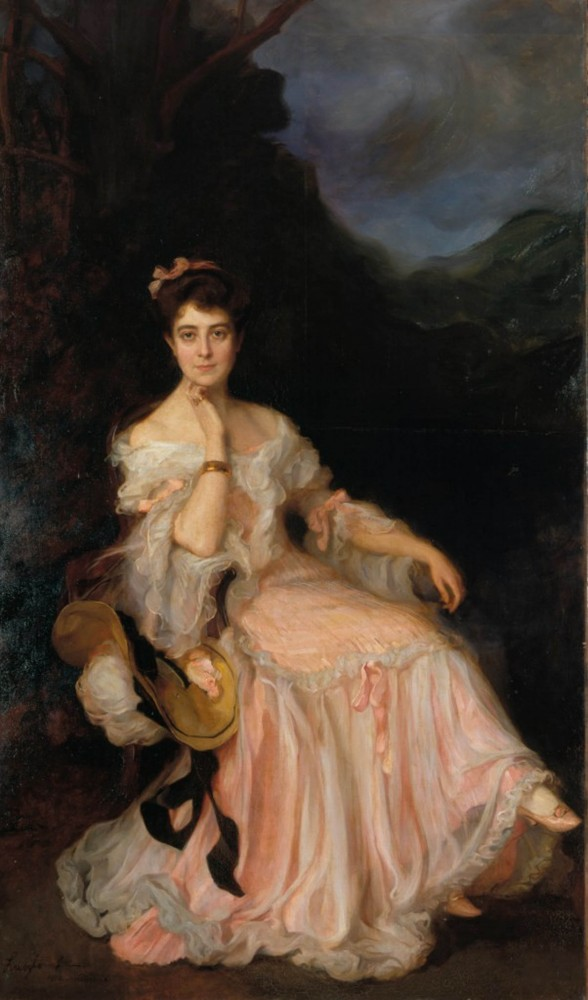
Élisabeth de Gramont, by Philip de László, 1902

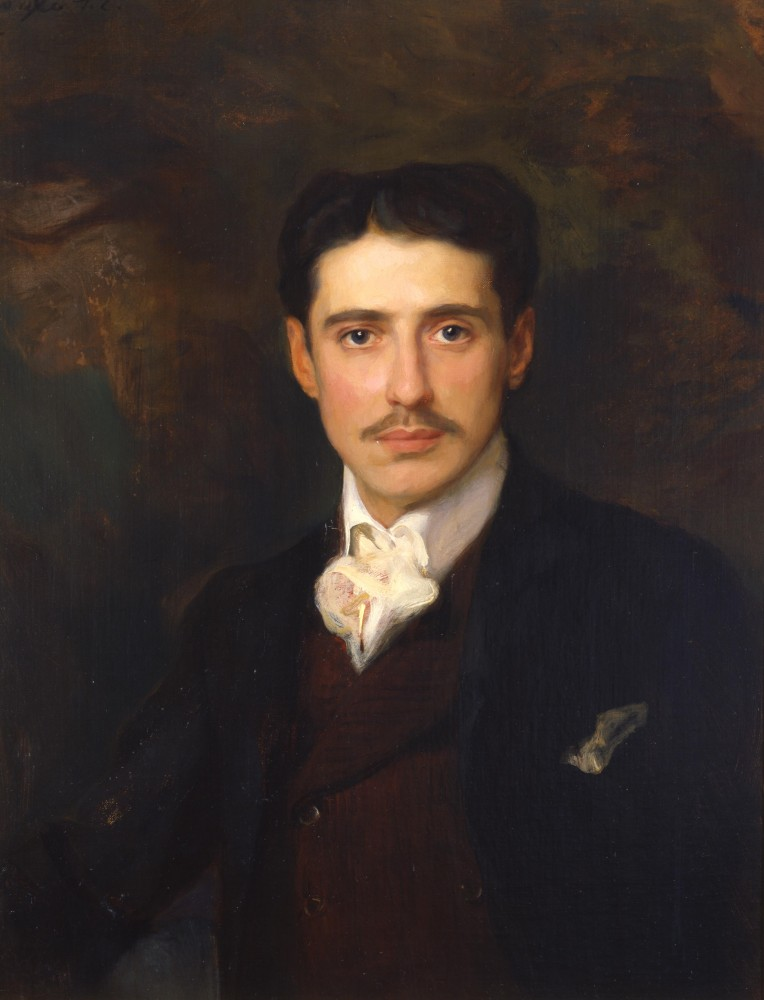
Armand de Gramont, by Philip de László, 1902

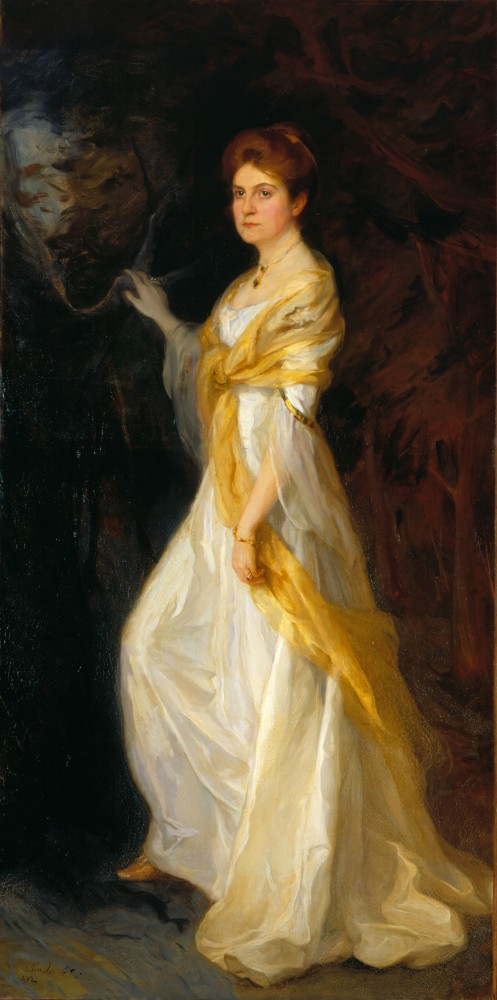
Corisande de Gramont, by Philip de László, 1902

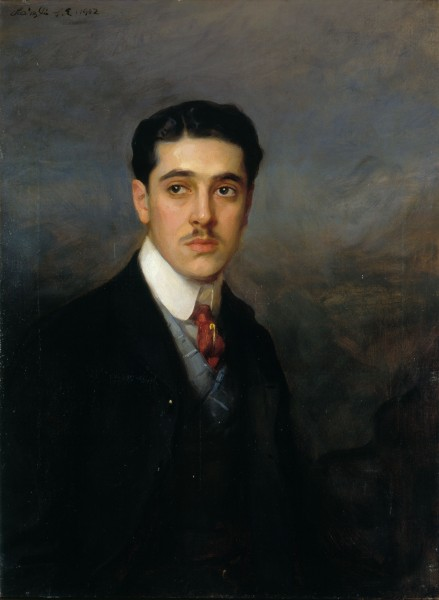
Louis-René de Gramont, by Philip de László, 1902

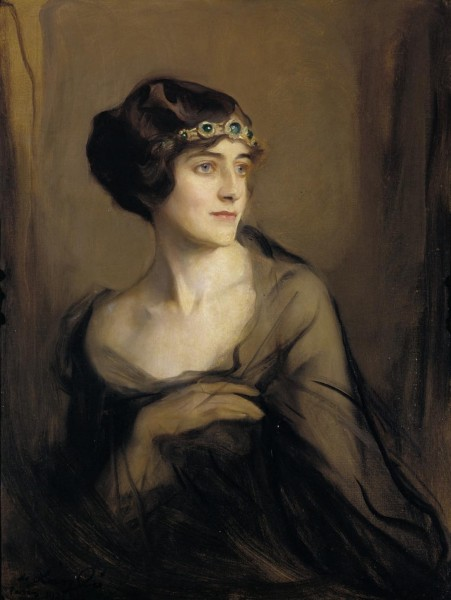
His daughter-in-law, Antoinette de Rochechouart-Mortemart (wife of Louis-René de Gramont), by Philip de László, 1921

French nobility
Preceded by Antoine Alfred Agénor	Duke of Gramont; 1880–1925	Succeeded by Armand Antoine Agénor de Gramont
