= Élaine Greffulhe =

French aristocrat

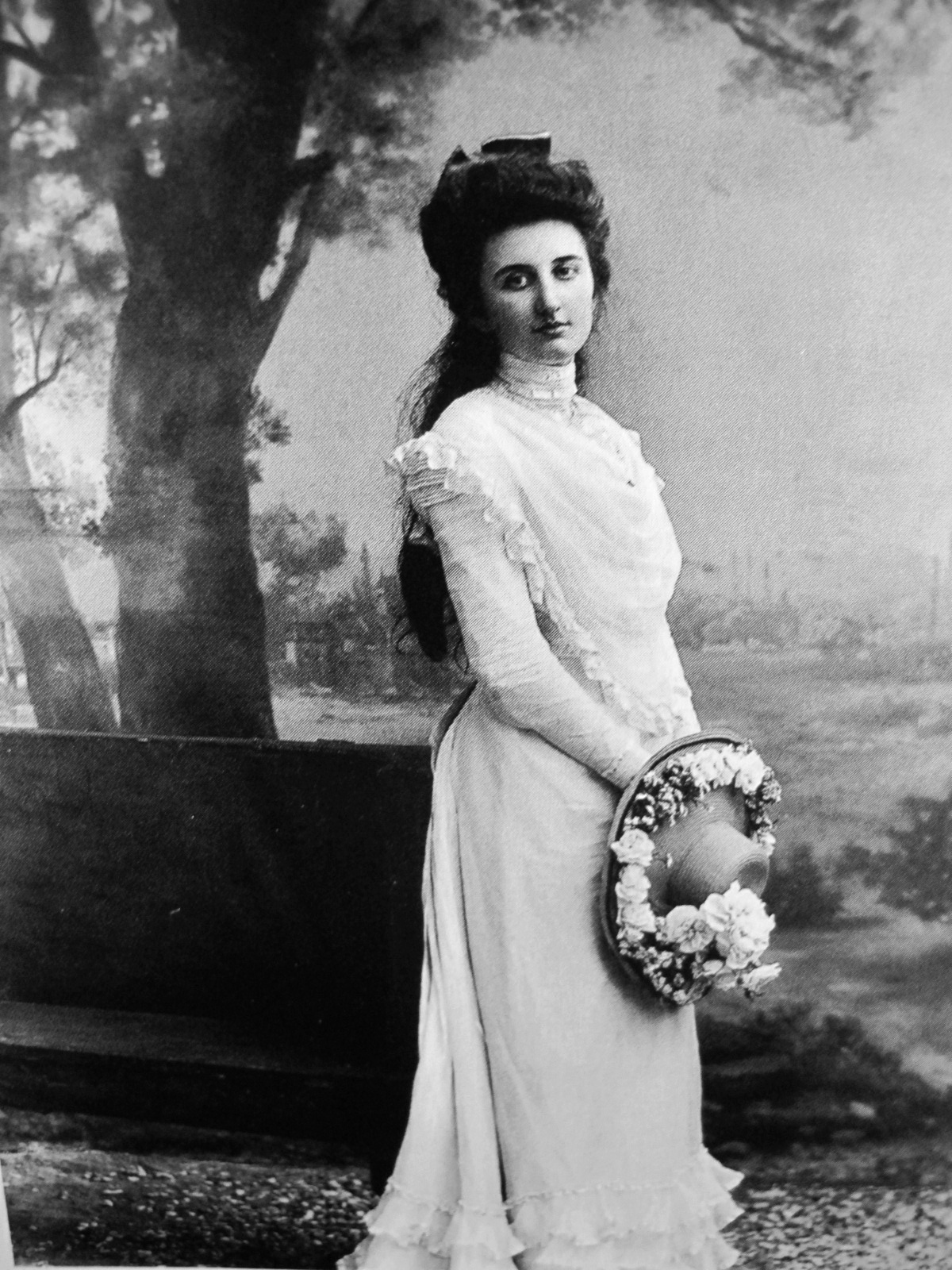
- Photograph taken by Nadar in 1900

Duchess of Gramont
- Tenure: 1925–11 February 1958
- Born: Élaine Marie Joseph Charlotte de Greffulhe; 19 March 1882; Paris, French Third Republic
- Died: 11 February 1958 (aged 75); Paris, France
- Noble family: de Greffulhe
- Spouse: Armand de Gramont
- Issue: Antoine Agénor Henri Armand de Gramont, 13th Duke of Gramont; Comte Jean Armand Antoine de Gramont; Comte Charles Louis Antoine Armand de Gramont; Corisande Marguerite Elisabeth de Gramont
- Father: Henry Greffulhe
- Mother: Élisabeth de Riquet de Caraman-Chimay

Countess Élaine Marie Joseph Charlotte de Greffulhe (19 March 1882 – 11 February 1958), who became the Duchess of Gramont by marriage, was a French aristocrat. She was a descendant of Hortense Mancini through her granddaughter's Pauline Félicité de Mailly son Charles de Vintimille, duc de Luc.

== Early life ==
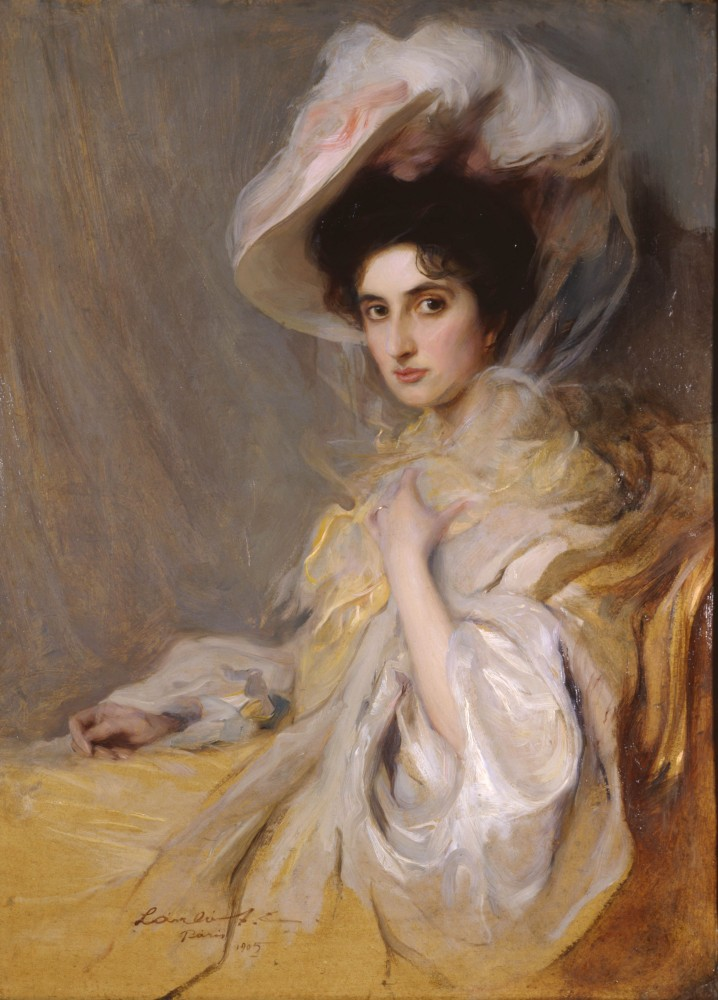
Portrait by Philip de László, 1905

Élaine was born on 19 March 1882 in Paris. She was the daughter, and heiress, of Count Henry Greffulhe and his wife, Élisabeth de Riquet de Caraman-Chimay (said to be a model for the Duchess of Guermantes in Marcel Proust’s novel, À la recherche du temps perdu).

== Personal life ==
In 1904, she married Armand de Gramont, who later became the 12th Duke of Gramont. His parents were Agénor de Gramont, 11th Duke of Gramont and the former Marguerite de Rothschild. A rare film clip may show Proust (in bowler hat and gray coat) at her wedding in 1904. Proust’s wedding gift to the groom was apparently a revolver in a leather case inscribed with verses from her childhood poems. Czar Nicholas II of Russia sent her a gift in honor of their 1904 marriage. Together, Élaine and Armand were the parents of:

- Antoine Agénor Henri Armand de Gramont, 13th Duke of Gramont (1907–1995), who married Odile Marguerite Marie Marthe Madeleine Sublet d'Heudicourt de Lenoncourt.
- Comte Henri Armand Antoine de Gramont (1909–1994), who married Élisabeth Meunier du Houssoy, a daughter of Robert Meunier du Houssoy, in 1939.
- Comte Jean Armand Antoine de Gramont (1909–1994), who married Ghislaine Meunier du Houssoy, also a daughter of Robert Meunier du Houssoy, in 1941.
- Comte Charles Louis Antoine Armand de Gramont (b. 1911), who married Shermine Baras
- Comtesse Corisande Marguerite Elisabeth de Gramont (b. 1920), who married Comte Jean-Louis de Maigret.

Élaine died in Paris on 11 February 1958.
