= Agénor de Gramont, 10th Duke of Gramont =

French politician and diplomat (1819–1880)

Agénor de Gramont
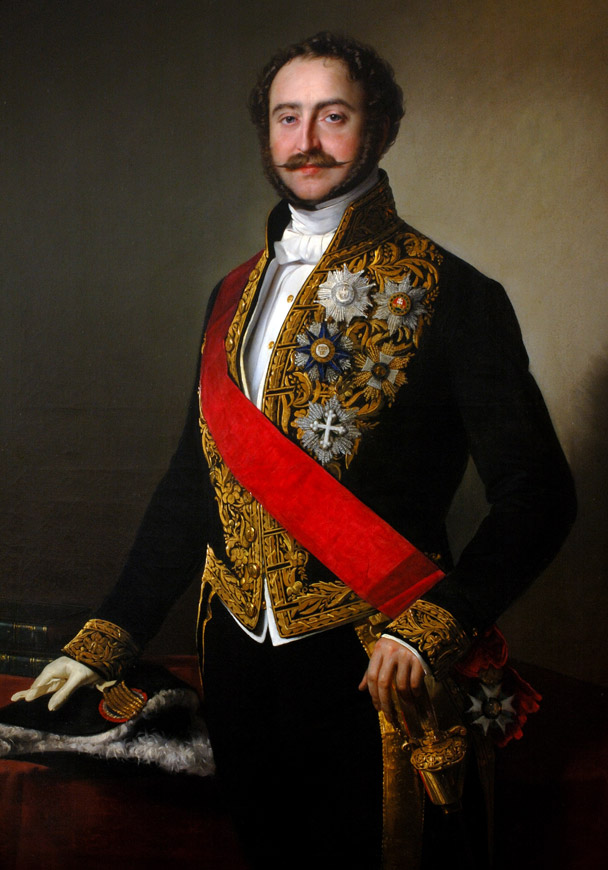
- Portrait of the Duke of Gramont, by Eliseo Sala, 1853

Minister of Foreign Affairs
- In office 1870–1870
- Preceded by: Émile Ollivier
- Succeeded by: Prince de La Tour d'Auvergne

Personal details
- Born: Antoine Alfred Agénor; 14 August 1819 Paris, France
- Died: 17 January 1880 (aged 60)
- Spouse: Emma Mary Mackinnon (m. 1848)
- Relations: Antoine VIII de Gramont (grandfather); Armand de Gramont (grandson)
- Parent(s): Antoine-Geneviève-Héraclius-Agénor de Gramont; Anna-Quintina-Albertine Grimod
- Education: École Polytechnique

Agénor de Gramont, 10th Duke of Gramont (Antoine Alfred Agénor; 14 August 1819 – 17 January 1880) was a French diplomat and statesman who also had the title Prince of Bidache.

== Early life ==
He was born in Paris to one of the most illustrious families of the old noblesse, a cadet branch of the viscounts of Aure, which took its name from the Seignory of Gramont in Navarre. His grandfather, Antoine VIII de Gramont, duc de Gramont (1755–1836), had emigrated during the French Revolution, and his father, Antoine Héraclius Genevieve Agénor (1789–1855), duc de Gramont and de Guiche, fought under the British flag in the Peninsular War, became a lieutenant-general in the French army in 1823, and in 1830 accompanied Charles X of France to Scotland.

The younger generation, however, were Bonapartist in sympathy; Gramont's cousin Antoine Louis Raymond, comte de Gramont (1787–1825), though also the son of an émigré, served with distinction in Napoléon's armies, while Antoine Agénor owed his career to his early friendship for Louis Napoleon.

His maternal grandfather was Albert Gaspard Grimod, his maternal grandmother Eleonore Franchi, Freiin von Franquemont (1771–1833), a natural daughter of duke Charles Eugene of Württemberg and his mistress Anna Eleonora Franchi.

Gramont was educated at the École Polytechnique.

== Career ==
Gramont early gave up the army for diplomacy. It was not, however, until after the coup d'état of 2 December 1851, which made Louis Napoleon supreme in France, that he became conspicuous as a diplomat. He was successively minister plenipotentiary at Cassel and Stuttgart (1852), at Turin (1853), ambassador at Washington DC (1854), Rome (1857) and at Vienna (1861).

In 1854, he was one of the few survivors of the disastrous sinking of the SS Arctic, while on route to Washington DC. De Gramont was observed leaping from the ship into the last lifeboat; he was one of the 85 survivors (61 crewmembers and 24 male passengers). More than 300 people died, including all the women and children on board.

=== Franco-Prussian War ===
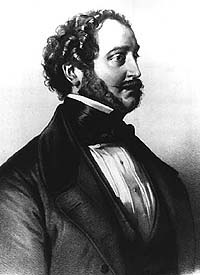
Agénor, duc de Gramont.

On 15 May 1870, he was appointed minister of foreign affairs in the Ollivier cabinet, and was thus largely, though not entirely, responsible for the bungling of the negotiations between France and Prussia arising out of the candidature of Prince Leopold of Hohenzollern-Sigmaringen for the throne of Spain, which led to the disastrous war of 1870-71.

The exact share of Gramont in this responsibility has been the subject of much controversy. The last word may be said to have been uttered by Émile Ollivier himself in his L'Empire libéral (tome xii, 1909, passim). The famous declaration read by Gramont in the Chamber on 6 July, the "threat with the hand on the sword-hilt," as Bismarck called it, was the joint draft of the whole cabinet; the original draft presented by Gramont was judged to be too "elliptical" in its conclusion and not sufficiently vigorous; the reference to a revival of the empire of Charles V was suggested by Ollivier; the paragraph asserting that France would not allow a foreign power to disturb to her own detriment the actual equilibrium of Europe was inserted by the emperor. So far, then, as this declaration is concerned, it is clear that Gramont's responsibility must be shared with his sovereign and his colleagues (Ollivier op. cit. xii. 107; see also the two projets de déclaration given on p. 570).

It is clear, however, that he did not share the "passion" of his colleagues for "peace with honour", clear also that he wholly misread the intentions of the European powers in the event of war. That he reckoned upon the active alliance of Austria was due, according to Ollivier, to the fact that for nine years he had been a persona grata in the aristocratic society of Vienna, where the necessity for revenging the humiliation of 1866 was an article of faith. This confidence made him less disposed than many of his colleagues to make the best of the renunciation of the candidature made, on behalf of his son, by the prince of Hohenzollern-Sigmaringen.

It was Gramont who pointed out to the emperor, on the evening of the 12th, the dubious circumstances of the act of renunciation, and on the same night, without informing Ollivier, despatched to Benedetti at Ems the fatal telegram demanding the king of Prussia's guarantee that the candidature would not be revived. The supreme responsibility for this act must rest with the emperor, "who imposed it by an exercise of personal power on the only one of his ministers who could have lent himself to such a forgetfulness of the safeguards of a parliamentary regime." As for Gramont, he had "no conception of the exigencies of this regime; he remained an ambassador accustomed to obey the orders of his sovereign; in all good faith he had no idea that this was not correct, and that, himself a parliamentary minister, he had associated himself with an act destructive of the authority of parliament." "On his part," adds Ollivier, "it was the result only of obedience, not of warlike premeditation" (op. cit. p. 262). The apology may be taken for what it is worth. To France and to the world Gramont was responsible for the policy which put his country definitely into the wrong in the eyes of Europe, and enabled Bismarck to administer to her the "slap in the face" (soufflet) as Gramont called it in the Chamber by means of the Bismarck-edited "Ems telegram," which was the immediate cause of the French declaration of war on the 19th.

=== Later life ===
After the defeat of Wissembourg (4 August) Gramont resigned his office with the rest of the Ollivier ministry (9 August), and after the revolution of September he went to England, returning after the war to Paris, where he died on 18 January 1880. During his retirement he published various apologies for his policy in 1870, notably La France et la Prusse avant la guerre (Paris, 1872).

== Personal life ==
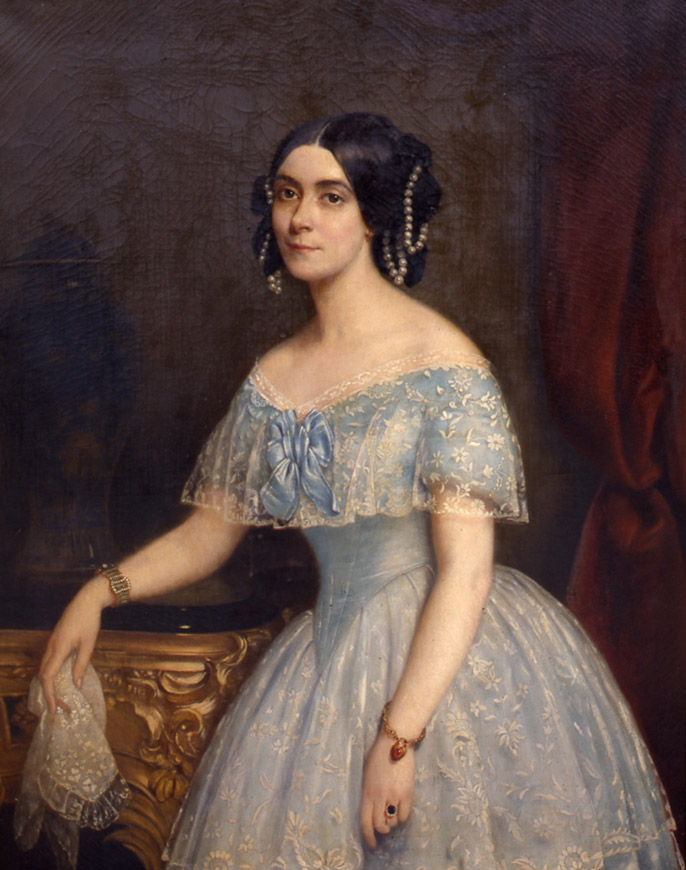
Portrait of his wife Emma Mary Mackinnon, by Jules Laure.

In his youth, Agénor de Gramont was the lover of the actress Rachel, de la Païva, and Marie Duplessis, the famous Lady of the Camellias: this last affair inspired Alexandre Dumas, Jr.’s novel and play, with Agénor de Gramont becoming the character Armand Duval.

His marriage on 27 December 1848 to Emma Mary Mackinnon (1811–1891), daughter of William Alexander Mackinnon, 33rd Chief of the Scottish Clan Mackinnon, produced four children, including:

- Antoine Alfred Agénor de Gramont, 11th Duke of Gramont (1851–1925), who married Marguerite de Rothschild. After her death, he married Maria Ruspoli.
- Armand de Gramont, Duke of Lesparre (1854–1931), who married Hélène Louise Eugénie Duchesne de Gillevoisin.
- Antoine Albert de Gramont (1856–1915), who married Jeanne Marie Sabatier.

He died in Paris on 18 January 1880. His widow died, also in Paris, on 15 November 1891.

French nobility
Preceded by Antoine Geneviève Héraclius Agénor	Duke of Gramont; 1855–1880	Succeeded by Antoine Alfred Agénor
Political offices
Preceded by Émile Ollivier	Minister of Foreign Affairs; 1870	Succeeded by Prince de La Tour d'Auvergne
