= Crouy-sur-Ourcq =

- Commune
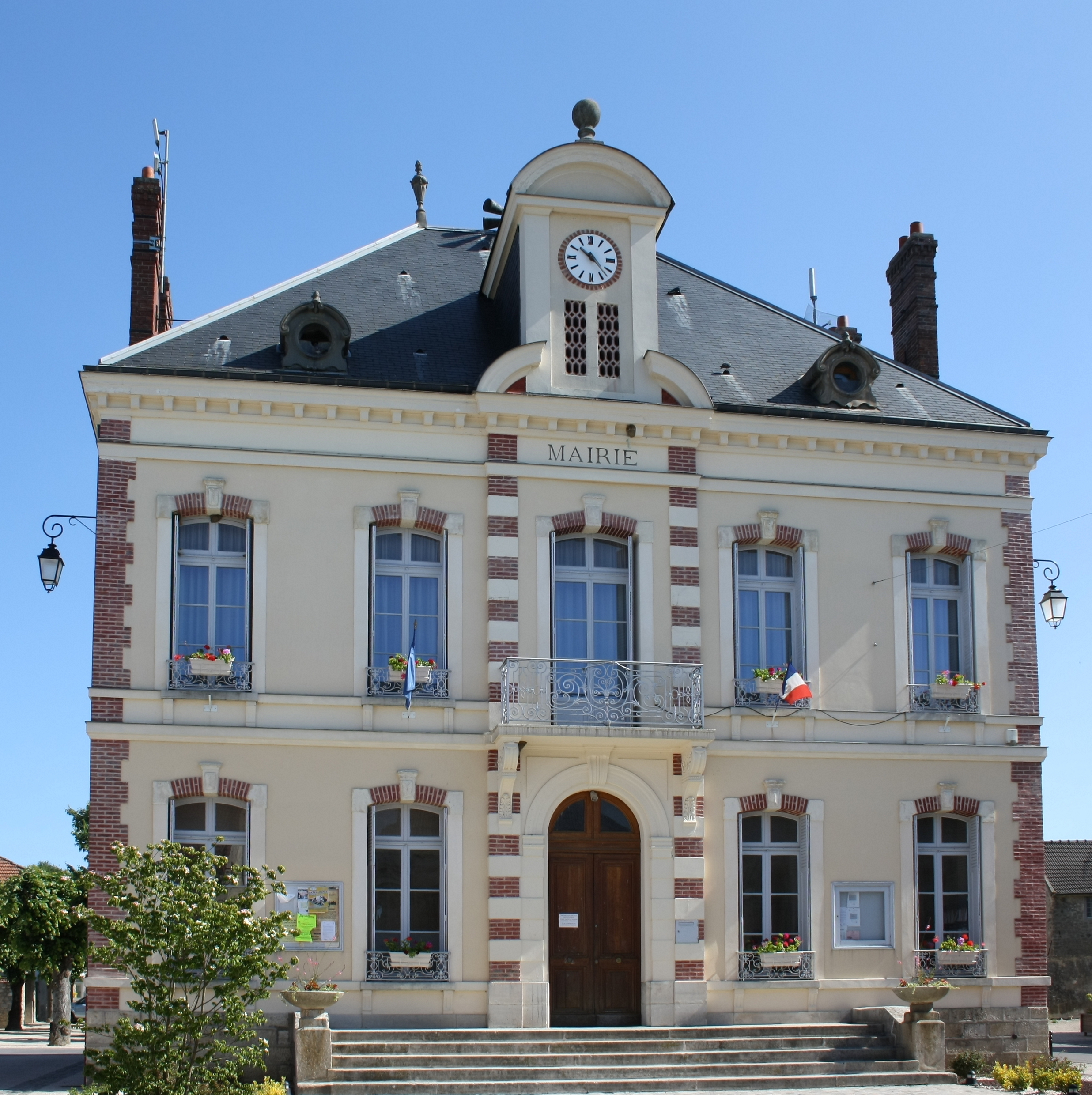
- The town hall in Crouy-sur-Ourcq

- Coat of arms
- Location of Crouy-sur-Ourcq
- Location within France Location within Île-de-France (region)
- Coordinates: 49°05′23″N 3°04′30″E
- Country: France
- Region: Île-de-France
- Department: Seine-et-Marne
- Arrondissement: Meaux
- Canton: La Ferté-sous-Jouarre
- Intercommunality: Pays de l'Ourcq

Government
  - Mayor (2023–2026): Didier Manson
- Area^{1}: 19.42 km^{2} (7.50 sq mi)
- Highest elevation: 165 m (541 ft)
- Lowest elevation: 52 m (171 ft)
- Population (2023): 1,811
  - Density: 93.25/km^{2} (241.5/sq mi)
- Time zone: UTC+01:00 (CET)
  - Summer (DST): UTC+02:00 (CEST)
- INSEE/Postal code: 77148 /77840
- ^{1} French Land Register data, which excludes lakes, ponds, glaciers > 1 km^{2} (0.386 sq mi or 247 acres) and river estuaries.

Crouy-sur-Ourcq (French pronunciation: [kʁui syʁ uʁk], literally Crouy on Ourcq) is a commune in the Seine-et-Marne department in the Île-de-France region in north-central France.

== Demographics ==
Inhabitants of Crouy-sur-Ourcq are called Crouyciens.

== Schools ==
The town has one preschool (école maternelle), one elementary school (école élémentaire), and the junior high school Collège le Champivert.

== See also ==
- Château du Houssoy
- Communes of the Seine-et-Marne department
