= Albert Gautier Vignal =

French-Monegasque nobleman and tycoon (1854–1939)

Comte Albert Gautier Vignal
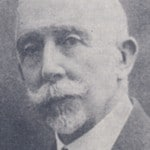
- Born: Albert-Joseph Gautier; 26 May 1854; Nice, France
- Died: 18 October 1939 (aged 85); Lausanne, Switzerland
- Other name: Albert Gauthier
- Spouse(s): Marie Boutau (m. 1883; died 1910) Edith Emma Schiff (m. 1911; died 1939)

Albert-Joseph Gautier Vignal (26 May 1854 – 18 October 1939) was a French-Monegasque nobleman and tycoon who sponsored various sports in the late 19th and early 20th centuries, particularly fencing.

== Early life ==
Gautier was from a French noble family that settled in Monaco in the early 1820s, eventually becoming leading figures in the business. Born on 26 May 1854 in Nice, he was a son of Hélène Sicard (b. 1831) and Paul Gautier (1819–1872), who served as president of the Chamber of Commerce in Nice.

== Career ==
A close friend of the Baron de Coubertin, Gautier founded the Monegasque Olympic Committee in 1907 and, from 1908 until his death, represented Monaco on the International Olympic Committee. He was a leading figure in developing fencing as a competitive sport, and Monaco as a sporting destination. In 1933 he became an honorary member of the International Fencing Federation (FIE).

Outside of sport, he was president of various banks as well as the Nice Electricity Company, and Consul-General for Romania in Nice.

=== Honors and awards ===
In 1895 Gautier was ennobled and created Count Gautier Vignal by Pope Leo XIII in recognition of his dedication to the Holy See. He was also made an Officer of the Legion of Honour in 1935, a Commander of the Order of the Crown of Romania, a Commander of the Swedish Order of Vasa, an Officer of the Order of the Star of Romania and a member of the Order of Polonia Restituta.

== Personal life ==
On 14 May 1883 in Nice, Gautier married Marie Boutau (1857–1910), a daughter of Jean Boutau and Agathe Désirée Perier. Together, they were the parents of:

- Madeleine Gautier Vignal (1884–1971), who married Paul Marie Adolphe de Foras, youngest son of Count Amédée de Foras, the Grand Marshal of the Court of Bulgaria, in 1910. After his death in World War I, she married Viscount Christian de l'Hermite.
- Thérèse Gautier Vignal (1886–1941), who married Gérard Sublet d'Heudicourt de Lenoncourt, a son of Odelric Sublet, Marquis d'Heudicourt de Lenoncourt, and Marguerite de Suremain, in 1908.
- Eugène Louis "Paul" Albert Gautier Vignal (1887–1914), who died fighting for France during World War I.
- Louis Gautier Vignal (1888–1982), a writer who was friends with Marcel Proust.
- Elisabeth Gautier Vignal (1895–1994), who married Alberto Chiesa in 1920.

After the death of his first wife in 1910, he married London born Edith Emma Schiff (1871–1953) on 29 April 1911 in Nice. A sister of Sidney Schiff and Marie Schiff (Baroness de Marwicz), they were children of stockbroker Alfred George Schiff.

The Count Gautier Vignal died on 18 October 1939 at Lausanne, Switzerland.

=== Descendants ===
Through his daughter Thérèse, he was a grandfather of Odile Marguerite Marie Marthe Madelene Sublet d'Heudicourt de Lenoncourt (1914–1994), who married Henri de Gramont, 13th Duke of Gramont in 1949.
