= Robert Meunier du Houssoy =

Robert Émile Meunier du Houssoy (5 July 1888 – 3 March 1968) was a French soldier and publisher who led Hachette.

== Early life ==
Meunier du Houssoy was born on 5 July 1888 in Sucy-en-Brie, a commune in the southeastern suburbs of Paris. He was the only son of Charles Leon Meunier du Houssoy (1849–1937) and Amélie Templier (b. c. 1860). Among his siblings were Madeleine Meunier du Houssoy, who married Henry de Roquemarel, Marquis de Roquemaurel in 1913, and Thérèse Meunier du Houssoy, who married Louis Abel Marie Ehrard Desmousseaux de Givré in 1920.

His paternal grandparents were Alexandre Antoine Meunier du Houssoy and the former Émilie Caroline Favard. Through his sister Madeleine, he was uncle to Count Ithier de Roquemaurel. His maternal grandparents were Émile François Templier and the former Louise Agathe Hachette (eldest surviving daughter of Louis Hachette).

== Career ==
Meunier du Houssoy was chairman and CEO of the publisher Hachette, which had been founded by his great-grandfather in 1826. He became head of the firm after the death of his relative, Louis Hachette, (Note: Louis Hachette (1870–1941), was a grandson of founder Louis Hachette through the elder Hachette's youngest son, George-Jean Hachette (1832–1892), and, therefore, a first cousin of Meunier du Houssoy's mother, Amélie (née Templier) Meunier du Houssoy.) in 1941. He was also director of Hachette workshops. While he was CEO and owner, Hachette distributed twenty-four of Paris' twenty-six newspapers as well as 612 magazines. Librairie Hachette was also "France's largest book publisher" and the company was "France's top publisher of periodicals."

He was awarded the Chevalier of the Legion of Honour and the Croix de guerre for valorous service during World War I, where he was a Lieutenant in the 32nd Infantry and was seriously wounded on 16 June 1917 during the Nivelle offensive at Chemin des Dames.

== Personal life ==
On 11 October 1913 at Boulogne, Meunier de Houssoy was married to Marie Christine Charlotte Octavie Béatrix de Pracomtal (1892–1956), a daughter of Count Rostaing de Pracomtal and Louise Harouard de Suarez d'Aulan (a daughter of Arthur Harouard de Suarez d'Aulan). Together, they were the parents of:

- Élisabeth Meunier de Houssoy (1914–1999), who married Count Henri Armand Antoine de Gramont, second son of Armand de Gramont, 12th Duke of Gramont and Countess Élaine Greffulhe, in 1939.
- Alain Meunier de Houssoy (1916–1930), who died young.
- Nicole Meunier de Houssoy (1917–1918), who died in infancy.
- Ghislaine Meunier de Houssoy (1920–1998), who married Count Jean Armand Antoine de Gramont, twin brother of Count Henri, in 1941.

Meunier du Houssoy died in Paris on 3 March 1968.
