= Duke of Gramont =

French noble title

Dukedom of Gramont
- Creation date: 1643; 1648
- Created by: Louis XIII and Louis XIV (regency of Anne of Austria)
- Peerage: France
- First holder: Antoine II de Gramont-Touloujon, 1st Duke of Gramont
- Present holder: Antoine de Gramont, 15th Duke of Gramont
- Heir apparent: none
- Subsidiary titles: Duke of Guiche; Count of Guiche; Prince of Bidache; Viscount of Aster
- Former seat: Château de Bidache

The title of Duke of Gramont (duc de Gramont) is a French dukedom and former peerage. It was created in 1648 for French Marshal Antoine III de Gramont.

== History ==
The family of Gramont was a Navarrese medieval noble house and owned the chateau of Bidache. They held land in Lower Navarre and in neighbouring Gascony, part of the kingdom of France. As their liege lords, the kings of Navarre, they played an active role in French politics. The last heiress of the house, Claire de Gramont (died in 1534) wed Menaut d'Aure and their son Antoine took the name Gramont rather than d'Aure.

Antoine de Gramont was a leading noblemen in south-west France during the Wars of Religion. At first, a Calvinist and lieutenant general to Queen Jeanne d'Albret, he switched sides to Catholicism and King Charles IX's service. He was created Count of Guiche in 1563. Antoine de Gramont was also the first Gramont to claim sovereignty over the Principality of Bidache. His grandson, also named Antoine de Gramont, viceroy of Navarra, was created Duke of Gramont in 1643.

Another famous member of the ducal house was Philibert de Gramont (1621–1707), younger son of the first Duke.

== Counts of Guiche ==
- 1563–1576 : Antoine I de Gramont (1526–1576)
- 1576–1580 : Philibert de Gramont (1552–1580)
- 1580–1643 : Antoine II de Gramont (1572–1644)

== Duke of Gramont, 1st Creation ==
- 1643–1644 : Antoine II de Gramont (1572–1644). The patent for the creation of the title was not registered in Parliament before his death, so his son had to petition for a new creation.

== Dukes of Gramont, 2nd Creation ==
- 1648–1678 : Antoine III de Gramont-Touloujon, 2nd Duke of Gramont (1604–1678)
- 1678–1720 : Antoine Charles IV de Gramont, 3rd Duke of Gramont (1641–1720)
- 1720–1725 : Antoine V de Gramont, 4th Duke of Gramont (1671–1725)
- 1725–1741 : Antoine VI Louis Armand de Gramont, 5th Duke of Gramont (1688–1741)
- 1741–1745 : Louis I de Gramont, 6th Duke of Gramont (1689–1745)
- 1745–1790 : Antoine VII de Gramont, 7th Duke of Gramont (1722–1801)
- 1815–1836 : Antoine Louis Marie de Gramont, 8th Duke of Gramont (1755–1836)
- 1836–1848; 1852-1855 : Antoine IX Geneviève Héraclius Agénor de Gramont, 9th Duke of Gramont (1789–1855)
- 1855–1880 : Antoine Alfred Agénor de Gramont, 10th Duke of Gramont (1819–1880)
- 1880–1925 : Antoine Alfred Agénor de Gramont, 11th Duke of Gramont (1851–1925)
- 1925–1962 : Antoine Agénor Armand de Gramont, 12th Duke of Gramont (1879–1962)
- 1962–1995 : Antoine Agénor Henri Armand de Gramont, 13th Duke of Gramont (1907–1995)
- 1995–2014 : Antoine Armand Odélric Marie Henri de Gramont, 14th Duke of Gramont (1951–2014)
- 2014– : Antoine de Gramont, 15th Duke of Gramont (b. 2008)

== Dukes of Guiche ==
- 1780–1836 : Antoine Louis Marie de Gramont (1755–1836), nephew of the 7th Duke of Gramont. He received the patent of Duke of Guiche on 16 April 1780 and succeeded his uncle, who died without issue in 1801, under the name and title of Duke of Gramont. Then, the title of Duke of Guiche was borne by the eldest of the Gramont family and heir presumptive to the title of Duke of Gramont.

== Dukes of Lesparre ==
- 1739–1774: Antoine de Gramont, 1st Duke Lesparre (1722–1801), Count of Lescun, then of Lesparre, created 1st Duke Lesparre in 1739, then became 7th Duke of Gramont in 1745.
- 1774–1790: Louis-Antoine de Gramont, 2nd Duke of Lesparre (1746–1790), brevet ducal title in 1774 (he predeceased his father)
- 1820–1877: Auguste de Gramont, 3rd Duke of Lesparre (1820–1877)
- 1877–1931: Armand de Gramont, 4th Duke of Lesparre (1854–1931)
- 1931–1971: Antoine de Gramont-Lesparre, 5th Duke of Lesparre (1889–1971). In 1913, he was authorized by decree to add to his name that of Moncey de Conegliano.
- 1971–1982: Arnaud de Gramont, 6th Duke of Lesparre (1928–1982).
- 1982–: Aimery de Gramont, 7th Duke of Lesparre (b. 1953).
  - Armand de Gramont (b. 1977), son fils.

== Gallery ==
Antoine III coat of arms

Antoine VIII coat of arms

Philibert coat of arms

== See also ==
- Gramont
- Rothschild family
