= Château du Houssoy =

14th–15th century castle in Seine-et-Marne, France

Coordinates: 49°5′29″N 3°3′50″E

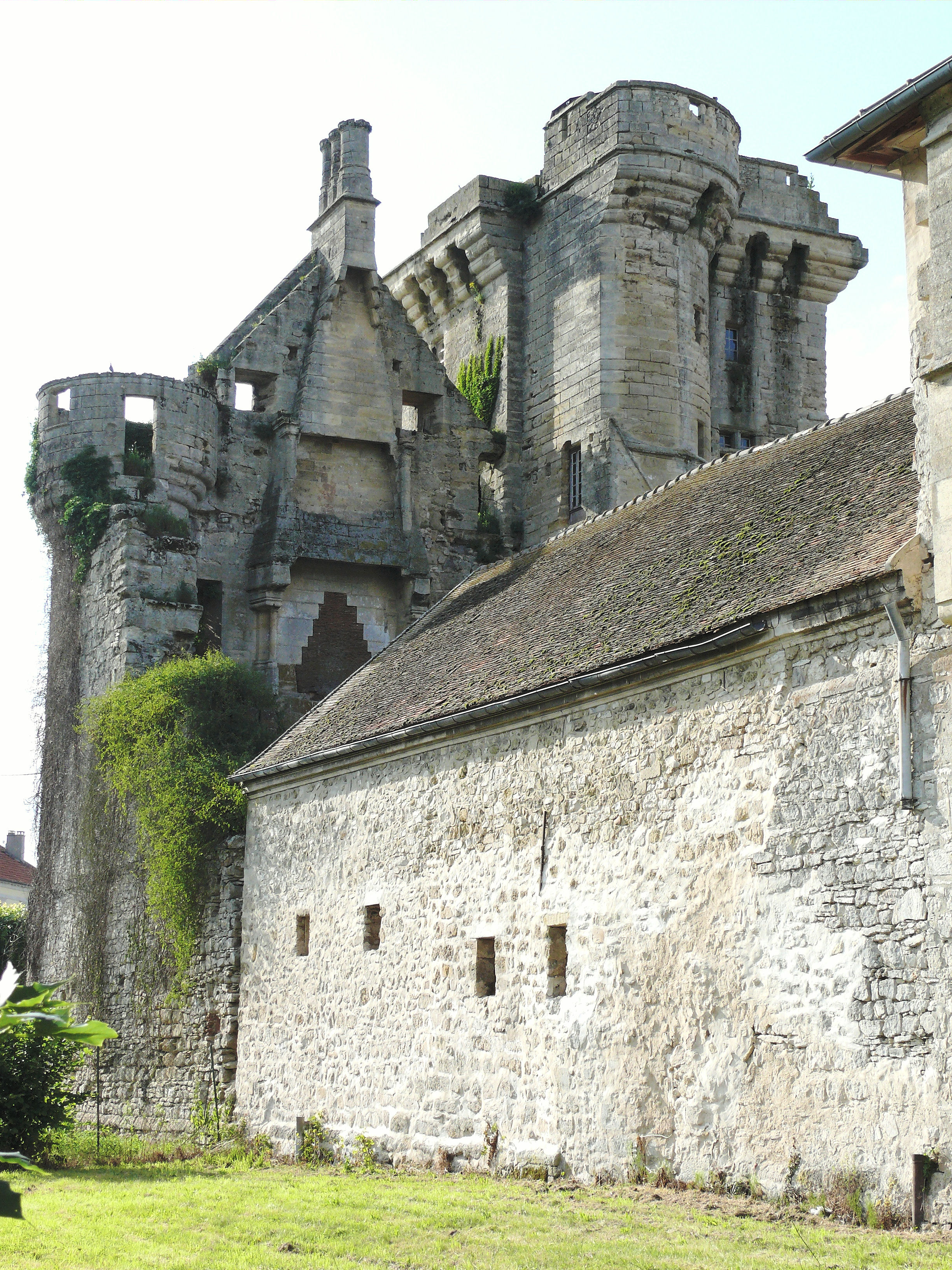
Facade of the Houssoy Castle

The Château du Houssoy is a 14th and 15th century castle in the commune of Crouy-sur-Ourcq in the Seine-et-Marne département of France.

The castle was built during the 14th century by Jean de Sépoix to replace an older structure. The Cossé-Brissac family was among the successive owners. René Potier de Gesvres purchased it in 1665 from Marguerite Payen. Later owners neglected the fief. Only a farm and the square keep remains.

It has been listed since twice as a monument historique by the French Ministry of Culture. One wing furnished with machicolations, extending along the Avenue de la Gare, was listed in 1932. The keep and the gabled wall of the former house, including its chimneys, were added in 1962.

The archives of the château were donated to the Archives départementales de Seine-et-Marne in 2019.

== See also ==
- List of castles in France
