= Henry Greffulhe =

French heir, socialite and politician

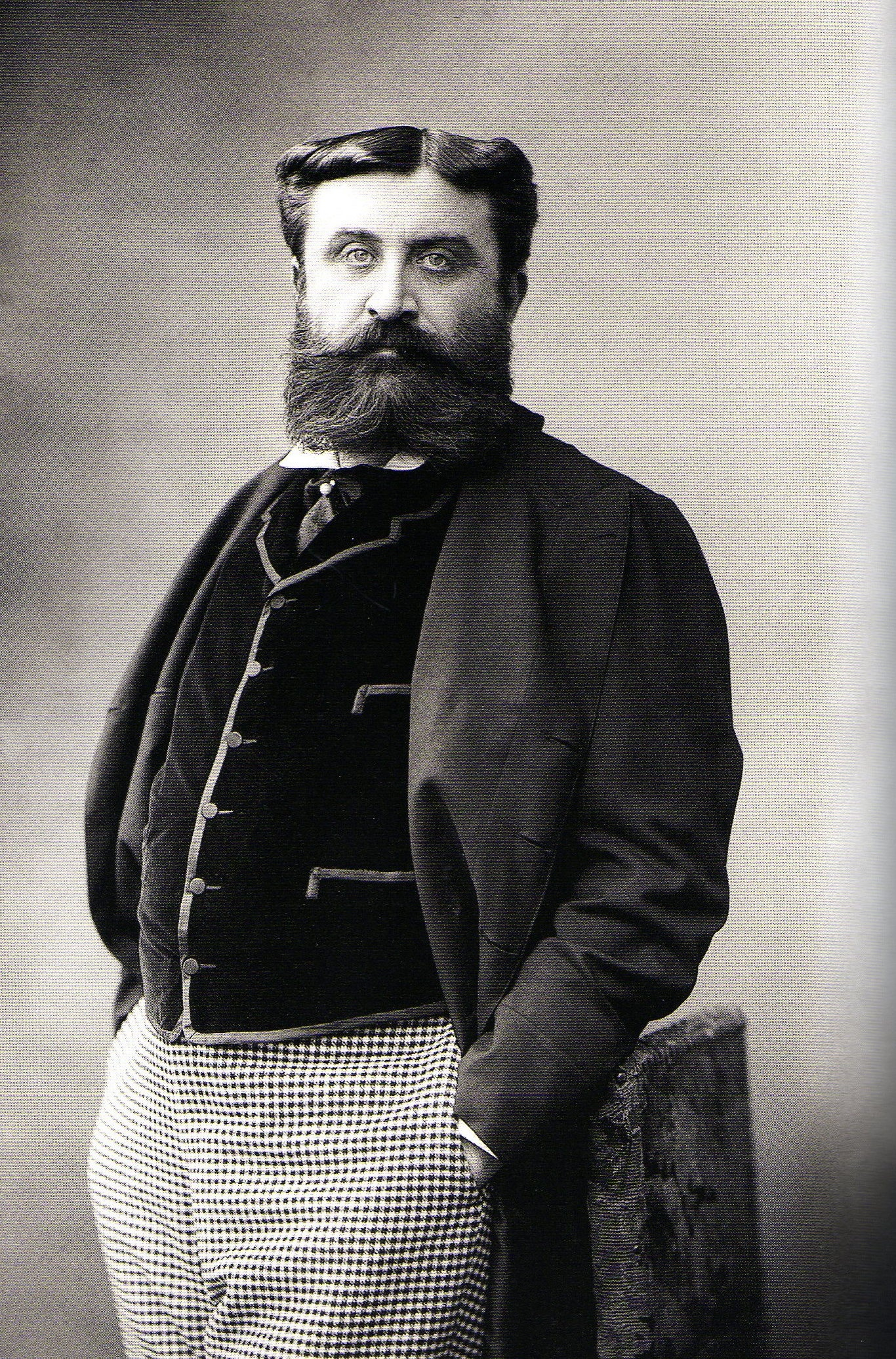
- Photograph taken by Nadar in 1881
- Born: Henry Jules Charles Emmanuel Greffulhe; 25 December 1848
- Died: 31 March 1932 (aged 83)
- Occupation: Politician
- Spouse: Élisabeth de Riquet de Caraman-Chimay (m.1881)
- Children: Élaine Greffulhe
- Parent(s): Louis-Charles Greffuhle; Félicité-Pauline-Marie de la Rochefoucauld d'Estissac

Count Henry Jules Charles Emmanuel Greffulhe (25 December 1848 – 31 March 1932) was a French heir, socialite and politician. He was the son of Louis-Charles Greffulhe and his wife, Félicité-Pauline-Marie de la Rochefoucauld d'Estissac.

He was a personal friend of author Marcel Proust. He has been pointed out as one of the main inspirations for the character of the duc de Guermantes in Proust’s novel, À la recherche du temps perdu.
