= Mayer Carl von Rothschild =

German Jewish banker and politician

Mayer Carl Freiherr von Rothschild
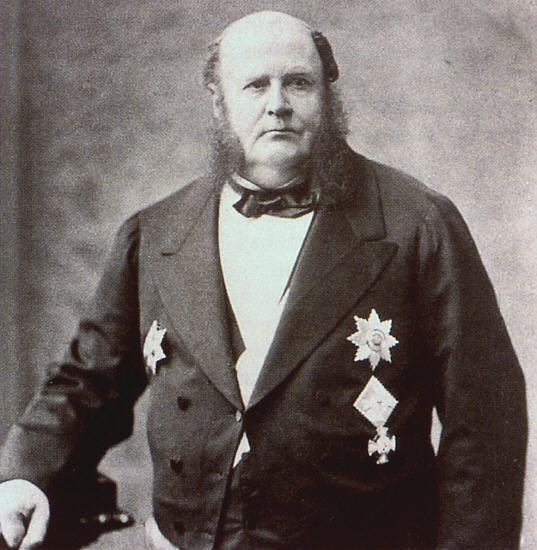
- Mayer Carl von Rothschild, date unknown
- Born: 5 August 1820; Naples
- Died: 16 October 1886 (aged 66)
- Occupation: Banker
- Spouse: Louise von Rothschild
- Children: Adèle von Rothschild; Emma Louise von Rothschild; Thérèse von Rothschild; Hannah Luise von Rothschild; Margaretha Alexandrine von Rothschild; Bertha Clara von Rothschild
- Parent(s): Carl Mayer von Rothschild; Adelheid Herz

Mayer Carl Freiherr von Rothschild (5 August 1820 – 16 October 1886) was a German Jewish banker and politician, as well as scion of the Rothschild family.

== Early life ==
Born in Frankfurt on 5 August 1820. He was a son of Adelheid (née Herz) and Carl Mayer von Rothschild. Among his siblings were Charlotte (wife of Lionel de Rothschild), Adolphe Carl, Wilhelm Carl (1828–1901), and Anselm Alexander Carl, who died young.

He studied law at the University of Göttingen and the University of Berlin.

== Career ==
After studying law, he joined the family banking firm M. A. Rothschild & Söhne in Frankfurt. Following the death of their uncle Amschel Mayer Rothschild, Mayer Carl and his brother Wilhelm Carl von Rothschild became heads of the firm.

In 1854, the firm was made Banker to the Court of Prussia. He was appointed the Duchy of Parma consulship in Frankfurt, Consul of Bavaria and Austrian Consul-General and, in 1866, he took part in a Frankfurt delegation to Berlin to demand a reduction in the contribution to the war effort, was a deputy in the North German Diet, a member of the German Reichstag and took a seat on the Frankfurt city parliament.

In 1871, Rothschild became the first Jewish member of the House of Lords of Prussia.

== Personal life ==
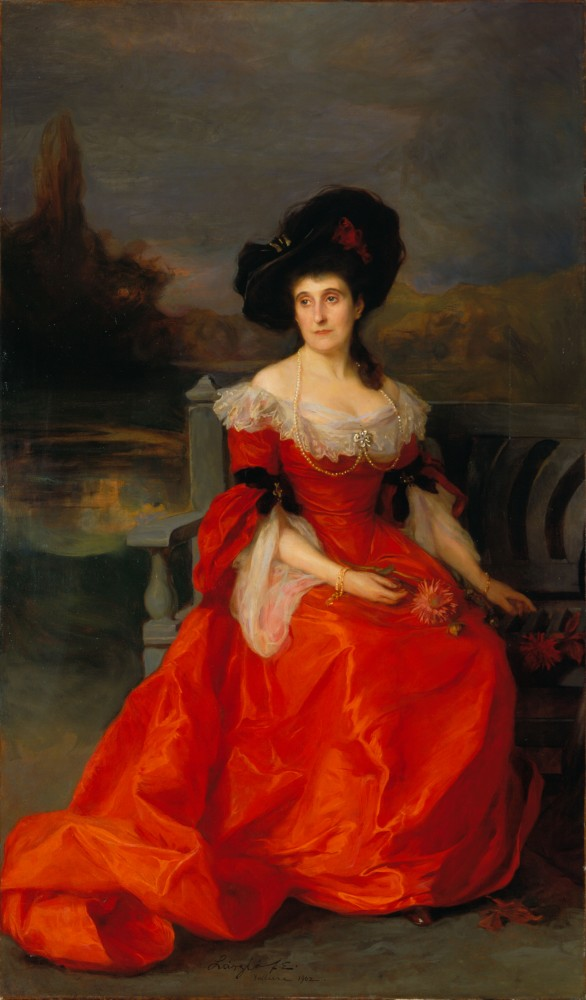
Portrait of his daughter, Marguerite, Duchess of Gramont, by Philip de László, 1902

On 6 April 1842, Rothschild married his cousin Louise von Rothschild at the London synagogue in Duke's Place. Together, the couple had seven daughters:

1. Adèle von Rothschild (1843–1922), married to Salomon James de Rothschild (1835–1864) in 1862.
2. Emma Louise von Rothschild (1844–1935), married to Nathan Mayer Rothschild (1840–1915) in 1867.
3. Clementine Henriette von Rothschild (1845–1865)
4. Thérèse von Rothschild (1847–1931), married to James Edouard de Rothschild (1844–1881) in 1871.
5. Hannah Luise von Rothschild (1850–1892).
6. Marguerite de Rothschild (1855–1905), married to Antoine Alfred Agénor de Gramont, 11th Duke of Gramont (1851–1925), a son of Agenor, 10th Duke of Gramont, in 1878.
7. Bertha Clara von Rothschild (1862–1903), married to Louis Philippe Marie Alexandre Berthier, 3rd Prince of Wagram (1836–1911), a son of Napoléon Alexandre Berthier, 2nd Prince of Wagram, in 1882.

Rothschild died on 16 October 1886.
