= Mortefontaine, Oise =

Mortefontaine
- Commune
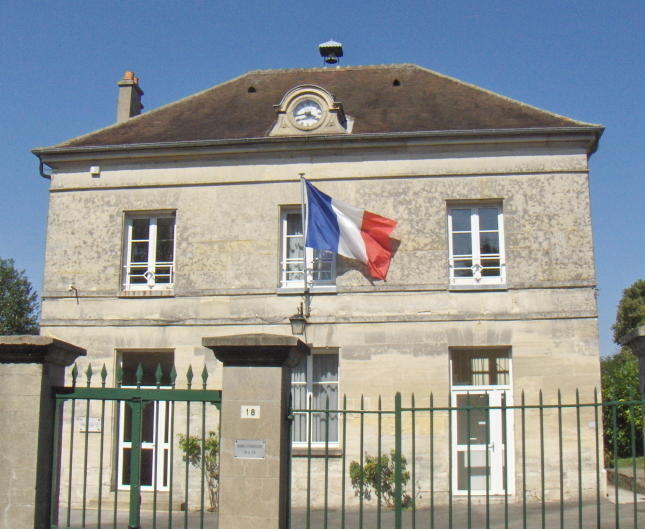
- Town hall

- Coat of arms
- Location of Mortefontaine
- Location within France Location within Hauts-de-France
- Coordinates: 49°06′47″N 2°36′01″E
- Country: France
- Region: Hauts-de-France
- Department: Oise
- Arrondissement: Senlis
- Canton: Senlis
- Intercommunality: CC de l'Aire Cantilienne

Government
  - Mayor (2020–2026): Jacques Fabre
- Area^{1}: 15.29 km^{2} (5.90 sq mi)
- Elevation: 93 m (305 ft)
- Highest elevation: 203 m (666 ft)
- Lowest elevation: 60 m (200 ft)
- Population (2023): 834
  - Density: 54.5/km^{2} (141/sq mi)
- Demonym: Mortifontain
- Time zone: UTC+01:00 (CET)
  - Summer (DST): UTC+02:00 (CEST)
- INSEE/Postal code: 60432 /60128
- Website: www.mortefontaine60.fr
- ^{1} French Land Register data, which excludes lakes, ponds, glaciers > 1 km^{2} (0.386 sq mi or 247 acres) and river estuaries.

Mortefontaine (French pronunciation: [mɔʁt(ə)fɔ̃tɛn]) is a commune in the Oise department in Northern France.

The 17th-century Château de Mortefontaine was bought by Joseph Bonaparte, elder brother of Napoléon Bonaparte, in 1798. The Convention of 1800 (also known as the Treaty of Mortefontaine), a friendship treaty between France and the United States, was signed in the castle. The preliminaries of the 1802 Peace of Amiens were also negotiated there.

== See also ==
- Communes of the Oise department
