= Emanuel, Prince of Solre, 7th Duke of Croÿ =

French soldier (1718–1784)

Emanuel
- Prince de Solre
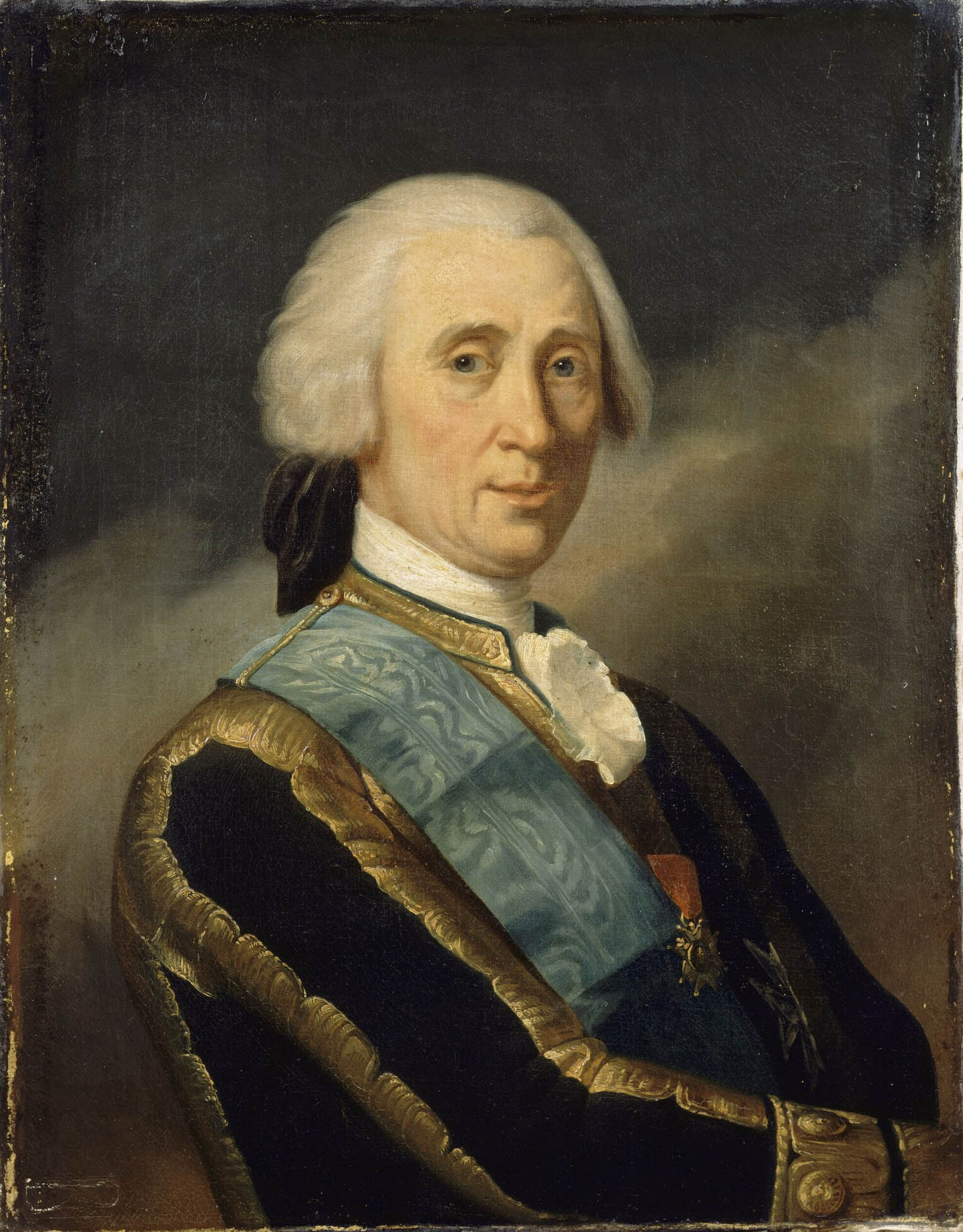
- Croÿ in a painting commissioned by Louis Philippe I in 1835

duc de Croÿ
- Reign: 1767–1784
- Successor: Anne Emmanuel, duc de Croÿ
- Born: 23 June 1718; Condé-sur-l'Escaut
- Died: 30 March 1784 (aged 65); Paris
- Spouse: Angelique d'Harcourt
- Issue: Anne Emmanuel, duc de Croÿ; Adelaide de Croÿ, Princesse de Croÿ-Solre
- House: House of Croÿ
- Father: Philippe-Alexandre-Emmanuel de Croy
- Mother: Marie Marguerite, Comtesse de Millendonk, Marquise du Quesnoy
- Occupation: Marshal of France

Emanuel, duc de Croÿ, Prince de Solre, (23 June 1718 – 30 March 1784) was a French soldier of the 18th century who attained the rank of Marshal of France.

== Biography ==
The only son of Philippe-Alexandre-Emmanuel de Croy, he was born a Prince of the Holy Roman Empire.

He joined the Rosen cavalry regiment as a Cornet on 27 November 1739, and obtained a company there in 1740. He went to Bohemia with this regiment, was present in 1741 at the Capture of Prague, returned to France in 1743, and fought at the Battle of Dettingen in June of the same year.
On 22 August 1743, he was appointed colonel of an infantry regiment bearing his name and was transferred to the Dauphiné army, which defended the borders against the Piedmontese army. He participated in most of the engagements that took place in the following campaign like the Siege of Villafranca (1744).

After this he took command of a regiment in the Army of the Meuse in 1747, under the orders of the Henri François, comte de Ségur, and fought at the Sieges of Mons, Charleroi, Namur and the Battles of Rocoux, where he received a musket shot that pierced his chest, and Lauffeld, where he lost an arm. He was created Brigadier after the battle.

Louis XV said to his father on this occasion :
Men such as your son deserve to be invulnerable.

In 1748, the King granted him the general governorship of the County of Foix, the general lieutenantship of Champagne in the department of Brie, succeeding his father, and created him brigadier general on 23 March 1749. He resigned from his regiment and took the oath for the governorship of the County of Foix upon the death of his father on 11 April 1753.

Appointed supernumerary inspector general of the infantry on 19 November 1756, he went to Corsica where he was commander at Ajaccio until 1 March 1757. Recalled to France, he was employed in the army of Germany and was present at the Battle of Hastenbeck, the Occupation of Hanover and the Battle of Krefeld in 1758. Upon the resignation of the Count of Maillebois on 23 May 1758, he was appointed inspector general of the infantry. On 1 May 1759, again employed in the army of Germany, he fought at the Battle of Minden and rescued a corps of 10,000 men, which the Duke of Brissac believed to be lost. For five hours, they had held their ground against forces three times their size.

After the campaign, he obtained the rank of Lieutenant General on 18 May 1760.
Later, he fought at the Battle of Warburg and Kloster Kampen, where he was wounded by two saber blows to the head and a bayonet wound in the neck, and taken prisoner.
In March 1761, he was released in a prisoner exchange and employed in the army commanded by the Marquis de Castries, where he led the Vaubecourt brigade in 1761. He attacked the Brücker Mühle bridge instead of the Marquis de Castries, who had been wounded.

He became a Knight in the Order of the Holy Spirit in 1767, Governor of the Franche Comté in 1775 and Minister of War in 1780.

After the attempted assassination of King Louis XV by Robert-François Damiens, he was sent to Artois, to investigate and reconstruct the route of the assassin. He was raised to the rank of Marshal of France on 13 June 1783 and he died in Paris on 30 March 1784 at the age of sixty-six.

=== Marriage and children ===
Emmanuel de Croÿ married in 1741 Angélique-Adélaïde d'Harcourt (1719–1744), daughter of François d'Harcourt (Marshal of France). Together they had:

- Adélaïde de Croÿ-Solre (1741–1822), married Joseph Anne Auguste, Duke of Croy-Havré (1744–1839), Duke of Havré, Lord of Tourcoing (1761–1789), Knight of the Golden Fleece.
- Anne Emmanuel, 8th Duke of Croÿ (1743-1803), Grandee of Spain, Field Marshal (1784), Knight of the Holy Spirit (1786), married Auguste Friederike zu Salm-Kyrburg (1747-1822), had issue.
