= Anne Emmanuel de Crussol, Marquis of Amboise =

Anne Emmanuel de Crussol Marquis of Amboise
- Born: 30 May 1726
- Died: 26 July 1794 (aged 68); Paris, French First Republic
- Spouse: Claude Angélique Bersin (m.1747)
- Military career
- Allegiance: Kingdom of France (1740–1792); First French Republic (1792–1793)
- Service years: 1740–1793
- Rank: Lieutenant General
- Conflicts: War of the Austrian Succession; Seven Years' War; War of the First Coalition

Anne Emmanuel François Georges de Crussol, Marquis of Amboise (30 May 1726 – 26 July 1794) was a French nobleman and military officer who was a deputy of the Second Estate at the Estates General of 1789. He was guillotined on the penultimate day of the Reign of Terror during the French Revolution.

== Military career ==
On 8 December 1740, Amboise entered the French Royal Army as a musketeer and saw extensive service in the War of the Austrian Succession, beginning with the 1742 campaign in Flanders. By commission of 1 January 1743, he raised a company in the Royal-Poland cavalry regiment, which he commanded at the recapture of Weissemberg and the lines of the Lautern, at the Haguenau affair on 25 August 1744 and at the siege of Freiburg im Breisgau on 11 October 1744. On 14 December 1744, he obtained the post of second cornet of a company of the light horses of Brittany, and the rank of lieutenant-colonel of cavalry. He was at the Battle of Fontenoy on 11 May 1745, at the sieges of Tournay, Dendermonde, Oudenarde and Ath in 1745. On 1 December 1745, he joined the company of Gendarmes de Berry, and he participated with this unit at the sieges of Mons, Charleroi, Namur and at the Battle of Rocoux on 11 October 1746.

On 20 January 1747, Amboise was second lieutenant of the company of gendarmes of Flanders, with the rank of mestre-de-camp of cavalry. He fought at the Battle of Lauffeld on 2 July 1747 and served at the siege of Maastricht in 1748. On 1 February 1749, he was appointed lieutenant captain of the Berry light horse company, which he commanded in the German army in 1757 during the Seven Years' War. On 3 January 1757, Amboise was made a Knight of Order of Saint Louis. He fought at Sondershausen, the capture of Cassel, the conquest of Hesse and the battle of Lutzelbourg in 1758. He was created brigadier on 10 February 1759, and was made colonel-lieutenant of the Queen's Regiment. On 15 October 1760, he commanded the Queen's Regiment at the Battle of Kloster Kampen, and in the Army of Germany in 1761. He was promoted to Maréchal de camp on 25 July 1762, and Lieutenant General on 1 March 1780.

== French Revolution ==
In March 1789, he was elected deputy by the nobility of the sénéchaussée of Poitiers to the Estates General of 1789. In the National Constituent Assembly he aligned himself with reformists as the French Revolution took hold. He remained a member of the assembly until it was dissolved on 30 September 1791. He was later commissioned by the French First Republic to command a division in the French Revolutionary Army during the War of the First Coalition. In 1793, he became a suspect to the Jacobins. Amboise was arrested, put on trial and guillotined in Paris on 26 July 1794, the day before the fall of Maximilien Robespierre.

== Family ==
Amboise was the son of Jean Emmanuel, Marquis of Amboise and Anne Marthe Louise Maboul de Fors.

On 16 March 1747, he married Claude Angélique Bersin. She was guillotined on 10 May 1794 in Paris with Élisabeth of France, sister of Louis XVI.
