= Charles II François Frédéric de Montmorency-Luxembourg =

French nobleman

Charles II Frédéric de Montmorency-Luxembourg
- Born: 3 December 1702; Paris, France
- Died: 18 May 1764 (aged 61); Paris, France
- Spouse: Madeleine Angélique Neufville de Villeroy (m. 1750; died 1764)
- Relatives: François-Henri de Montmorency, duc de Luxembourg (Grandfather); Charles II Frédéric de Montmorency-Luxembourg (Father)
- Military career
- Allegiance: Kingdom of France
- Branch: House of Montmorency
- Rank: Marshal of France
- Conflicts: War of the Quadruple Alliance
- Awards: Order of the Holy Spirit; Order of Saint Michael

Charles II François Frédéric de Montmorency (December 31, 1702 – May 18, 1764) was a French aristocrat who held a number of titles, including 8th Duke of Piney-Luxembourg, 2nd Duke of Montmorency, Prince of Aigremont and of Tingry, Count of Bouteville, of Lassé, of Dangu and of Luxe.

== Early life ==
He was the son of Charles François Frédéric de Montmorency-Luxembourg and Marie-Gilonne Gillier de Clérembault, daughter of René de Clérembault. His father purchased the duchy of Beaufort from the 5th Duke of Beaufort in 1688 and was created Duke of Beaufort without a peerage that same year. The dukedom of Beaufort was renamed as the dukedom of Montmorency in 1689. His father also succeeded his grandfather, Marshal François-Henri de Montmorency, as Duke of Piney-Luxembourg in 1695.

== Career ==
A Peer of France, he was made a Marshal of France in 1757 and the governor of Normandy in 1762.

He gave refuge to Jean-Jacques Rousseau, the famous French philosopher, at the "Small Castle" at Montmorency during 1759 to 1762 (an area which was owned by Charles Le Brun and Pierre Crozat; was distinguished from another stay of Rousseau in Montmorency: Mont-Louis, previously offered by Mr. Mathas, tax attorney for the Prince of Condé) when he was quarreling with Madame d'Epinay, his protectress.

== Personal life ==
On 9 January 1724, he married Marie-Sophie Colbert (1711–1747), Marquise de Seignelay, Countess of Tancarville and Lady of Gournay, a granddaughter of Jean-Baptiste de Seignelay. Before her death at Rue Neuve-des-Petits-Champs in Paris on 29 October 1747, they had two children:

- Anne-Maurice de Montmorency-Luxembourg (d. 1760), who married Anne Louis Alexandre de Montmorency, Prince of Robecque, Grandee of Spain, in 1745.
- Anne François de Montmorency-Luxembourg (1735–1761), styled Duke of Montmorency, Baron of Jaucourt, Count of Tancarville and Gournay, Marquis of Seignelay.

In 1750, he married Madeleine Angélique Neufville de Villeroy, the wealthy widow of Joseph Marie de Boufflers, Duke of Boufflers. The daughter of Louis Nicolas de Neufville, 3rd Duke of Villeroy, and Marguerite Le Tellier, she served as a Dame du Palais to Queen Marie Leszczyńska at Versailles between 1734 and 1749. From her first marriage, she was the mother of Charles Joseph de Boufflers, who married Marie Anne Philippine Thérèse de Montmorency in 1747 (parents of Amélie de Boufflers).
