= Pragmatic Army =

Historic military force

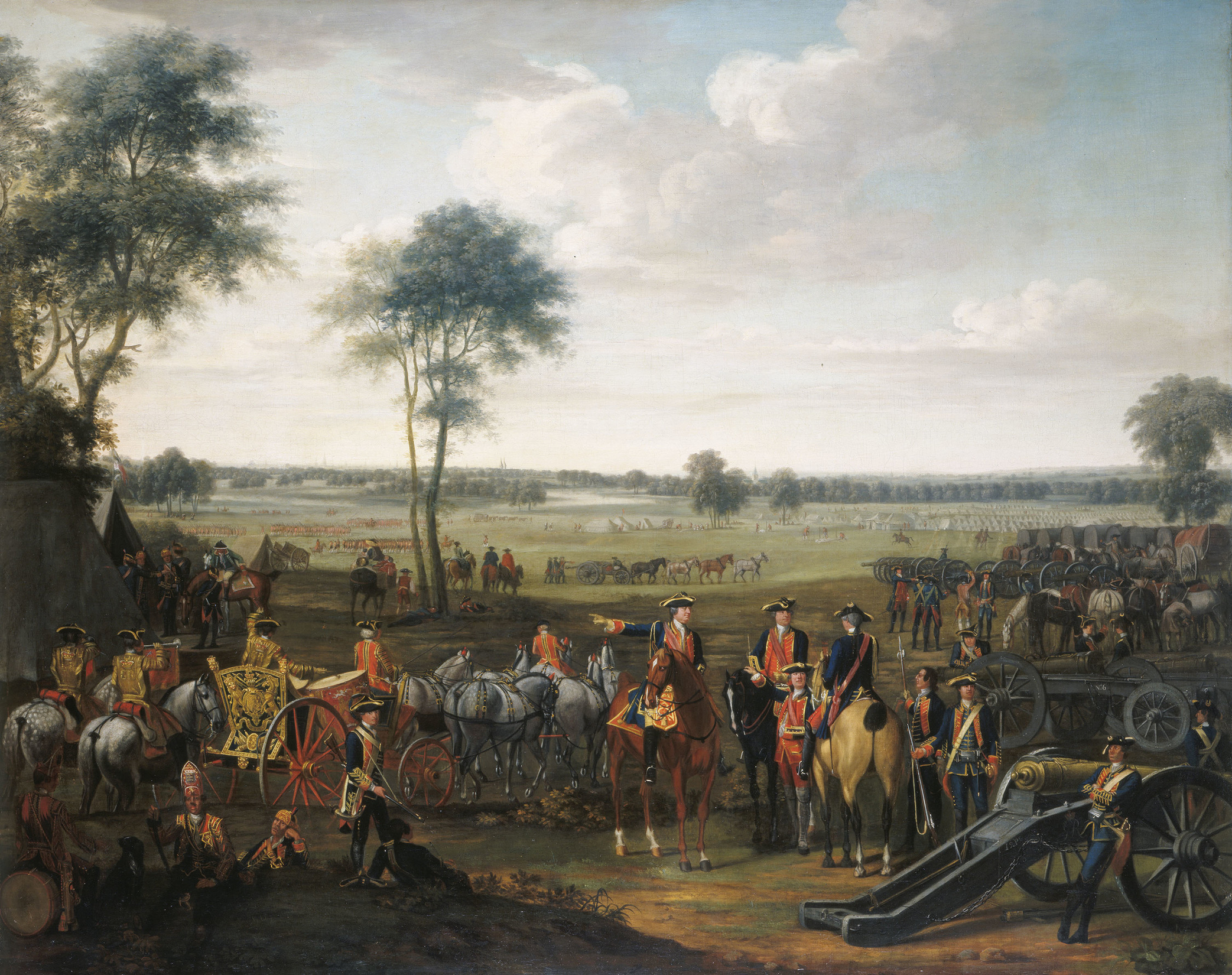
Painting of British Pragmatic Army troops in the Low Countries in 1748

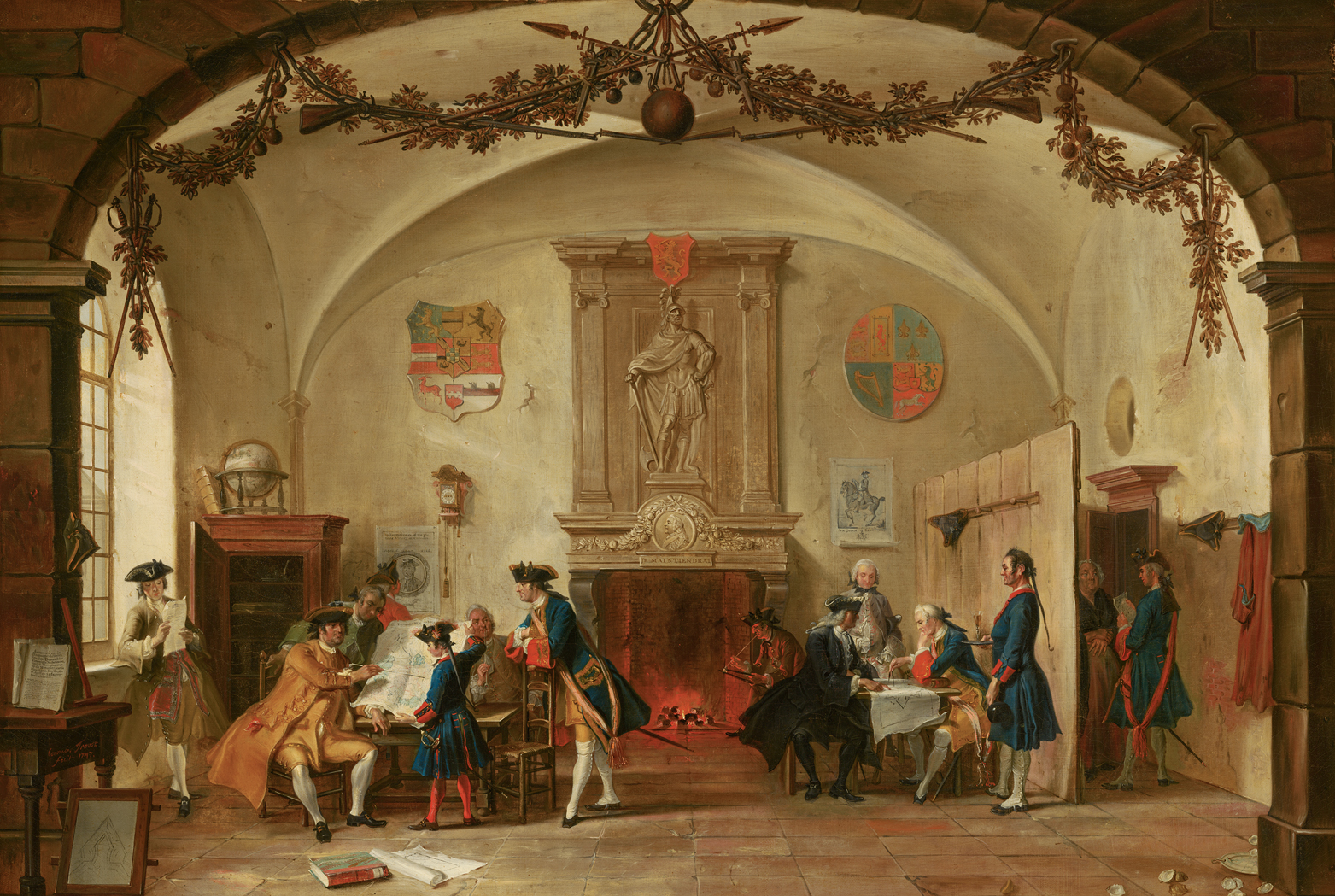
1747 painting of Dutch officers of the Pragmatic Army in a guardroom

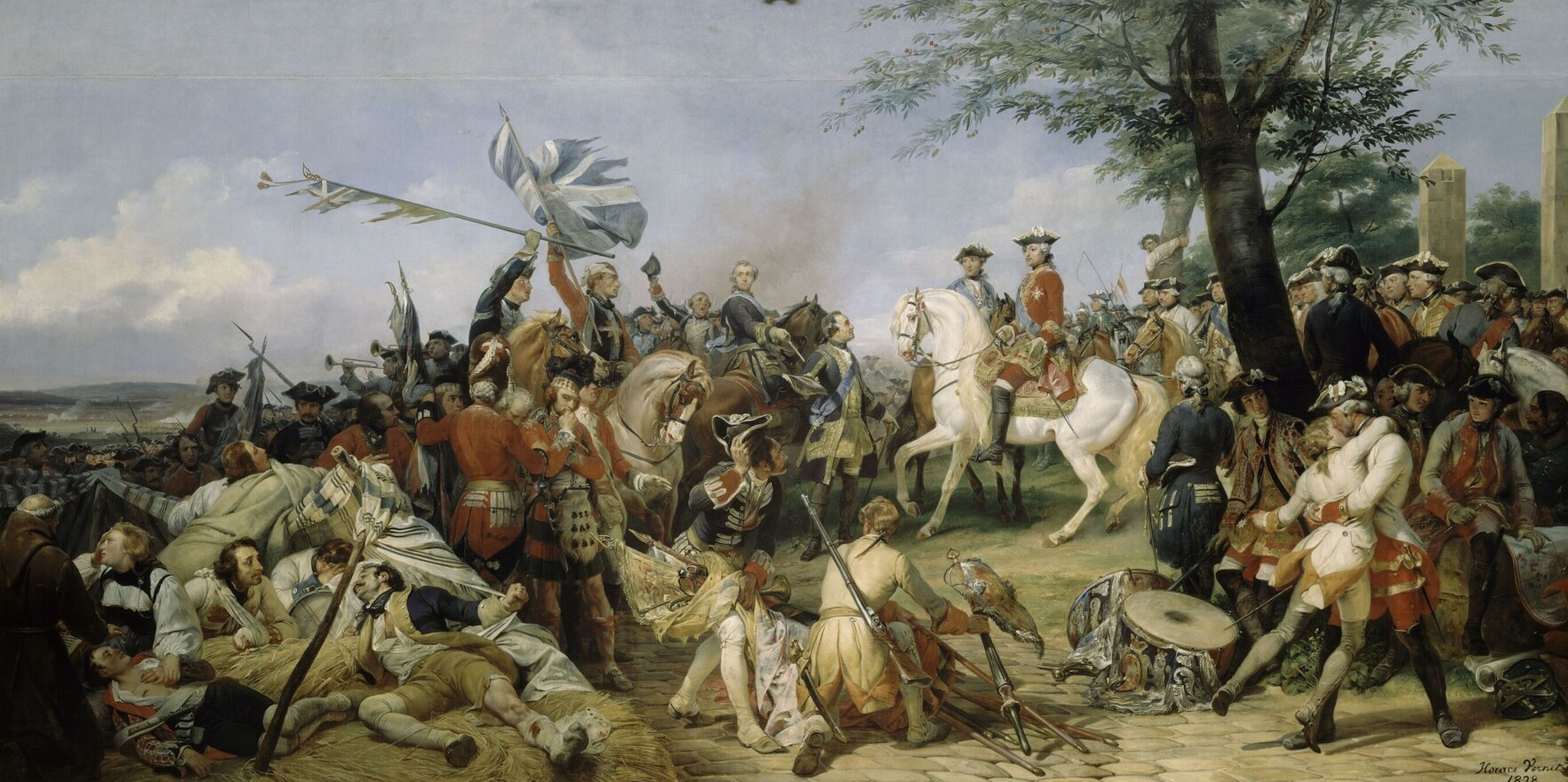
The Battle of Fontenoy, in which the French defeated the Pragmatic Army

The Pragmatic Army (German: Pragmatische Armee, Dutch: Pragmatische leger) was an army which served during the War of the Austrian Succession. It was formed in 1743 by George II, who was both King of Great Britain and Elector of Hanover, and comprised British, Hanoverian, Dutch and Austrian troops. It was designed to uphold the Pragmatic Sanction of 1713 in support of George's ally Maria Theresa of Austria and took its name from this.

When her father Emperor Charles VI died in 1740, Maria Theresa was attacked by several enemies including Frederick the Great of Prussia who seized Silesia. She was then attacked again by a wider coalition led by France. Britain was staunch in backing Maria Theresa, but in his dual role George as Elector of Hanover signed a neutrality with France, a position that caused political controversy in London. Despite his professed neutrality as Elector of Hanover, George agreed to send a large detachment of the Hanoverian Army along with allied Hessian troops in British pay to take part in the war effort. He justified this by saying that they were wholly under British control, and therefore did not violate his agreement with France.

George personally led the Pragmatic Army to victory at the Battle of Dettingen in June 1743, becoming the last serving British monarch to command troops in person. This effectively brought an end to French hopes in Germany where they had been supporting Maria Theresa's rival Charles of Bavaria. Subsequently George's younger son the Duke of Cumberland, assumed command. In response the French planned an invasion of Britain but this proved abortive. The Pragmatic Army's base shifted from the Rhineland to the Austrian Netherlands, modern Belgium. The two armies fought at the Battle of Fontenoy in May 1745. The battle was hard-fought and resulted in heavy casualties on both sides, but ended in French victory.

In summer 1745 the British Jacobites launched an uprising in Scotland which enjoyed considerable success, with troops under the Jacobite heir Charles Edward Stuart crossing into England and reaching as far south as Derby. The threat to the homeland led large detachments of the Pragmatic Army to be withdrawn to Britain. Although Cumberland led pro-Hanoverian forces to victory at the Battle of Culloden, the French under Maurice de Saxe were able to take advantage of his absence to besiege Brussels and then followed this up by taking Ghent, Mons and Namur.

The Pragmatic army suffered a loss at the Battle of Rocoux (October 1746) and then again following the return of Cumberland and British reinforcements at the Battle of Lauffeld (July 1747). France had seized control of much of the Austrian Netherlands, but was suffering from war exhaustion and strung by naval and colonial defeats and took part in covert talks with Britain in Breda to end the war. At the Treaty of Aix-la-Chapelle in 1748 France agreed to evacuate all the occupied territory of Belgium, in exchange for Britain handing back the captured Canadian stronghold of Louisbourg.

In 1757 during the Seven Years' War British and allied German forces again battled the French following the Invasion of Hanover.

== Bibliography ==
- Black, Jeremey. America Or Europe?: British Foreign Policy, 1739-63. Routledge, 2002.
- Brumwell, Stephen. Paths of Glory: The Life and Death of General James Wolfe.
- Clodfelter, Micheal. Warfare and Armed Conflicts. McFarland, 2017. A & C Black, 2006.
- Falkner, James. The Battle of Fontenoy 1745: Saxe against Cumberland in the War of the Austrian Succession. Pen and Sword, 2019.
- Ingrao, Charles W. The Habsburg Monarchy, 1618-1815. Cambridge University Press, 2000.
- McNally, Michael . Dettingen 1743: Miracle on the Main. Bloomsbury Publishing, 2020.
- Thompson, Andrew C. George II: King and Elector. Yale University Press, 2011.
- Van Lennep, Jacob (1880). "22". De geschiedenis van Nederland, aan het Nederlandsche Volk verteld. Deel 3 [The history of the Netherlands, told to the Dutch nation.] (in Dutch). Vol. 3. Leiden.
