= Siege of Namur =

The siege of Namur can refer to a number of sieges of the city of Namur in Belgium:

- Siege of Namur (1577) - John of Austria takes the citadel by surprise
- Siege of Namur (1692) by the French (under Louis XIV and Vauban)
- Siege of Namur (1695) by the Allies (Dutch, English, and Brandenburgers)
- Siege of Namur (1746) by the French, during the War of the Austrian Succession
- Siege of Namur (1792) by the French, during the War of the First Coalition
- Siege of Namur (1914) by the Germans, during World War I

== See also ==
- Fortified Position of Namur
