= Battle of Brussels =

The Battle of Brussels may refer to a number of historical events including:

- Bombardment of Brussels (1695), during the Nine Years' War
- Siege of Brussels (1746), during the War of the Austrian Succession
