= Siege of Mons =

Siege of Mons may refer to:

- Siege of Mons (1572), during the Eighty Years' War
- Siege of Mons (1691), during the Nine Years' War
- Siege of Mons (1709), during the War of the Spanish Succession
- Siege of Mons (1746), during the War of the Austrian Succession
