= Joseph Marie de Boufflers =

French nobleman and military officer

Joseph Marie de Boufflers Duke of Boufflers
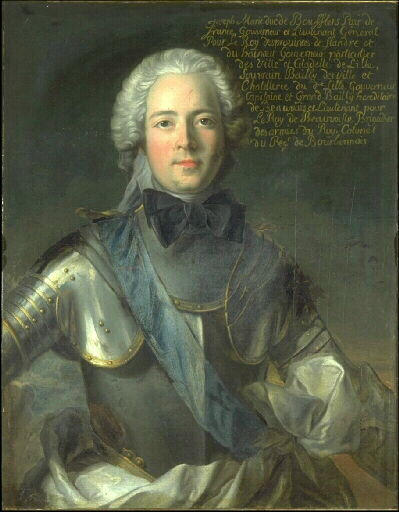
- Portrait of the duke by Jean-Marc Nattier
- Born: 22 May 1706
- Died: 2 July 1747 (aged 41); Genoa, Republic of Genoa
- Spouse: Madeleine Angélique Neufville (m. 1721)
- Children: Charles Joseph Marie de Boufflers
- Relatives: Louis-François de Boufflers (father); Catherine Charlotte de Gramont (mother); Amélie de Boufflers (granddaughter)
- Military career
- Allegiance: Kingdom of France
- Service years: 1720–1747
- Rank: Lieutenant General
- Conflicts: War of the Polish Succession; War of the Austrian Succession
- Awards: Knight of the Order of the Holy Spirit

Joseph Marie de Boufflers, 2nd Duke of Boufflers (22 May 1706 – 2 July 1747) was a French nobleman and senior military officer.

== Early life ==
Joseph Marie was the third, but only surviving, son of Louis-François de Boufflers and Catherine Charlotte de Gramont, daughter of Antoine Charles de Gramont, 3rd Duke of Gramont. His father was a marshal of France who was made a peer of France as Duke of Boufflers in 1708.

Following the death of his elder brother, on 22 March 1711 he assumed the title Comte de Boufflers and on 28 March 1711 he was made colonel of his late brother's infantry regiment, despite being only five years old. On 22 August 1711, Joseph Marie inherited his father's title and estates. He also assumed his father's positions as governor of Flanders and Hainut, Lille, and Beauvais.

== Military career ==
On 1 December 1720 he was made colonel of the Régiment de Beaufort, which from May 1721 was renamed Régiment de Boufflers. On 1 July, Joseph Marie received the Régiment de Bourbonnais, for which he gave up the regiment of his name.

He served Louis XV in the War of the Polish Succession and was present at the Siege of Kehl in October 1733, the attack on Ettlingen Line in May 1734 and the Siege of Philippsburg from May to July 1734. On 1 August 1734 he was promoted to brigadier. On 1 January 1740, he was promoted to maréchal de camp, after which he relinquished command of the Régiment de Bourbonnais.

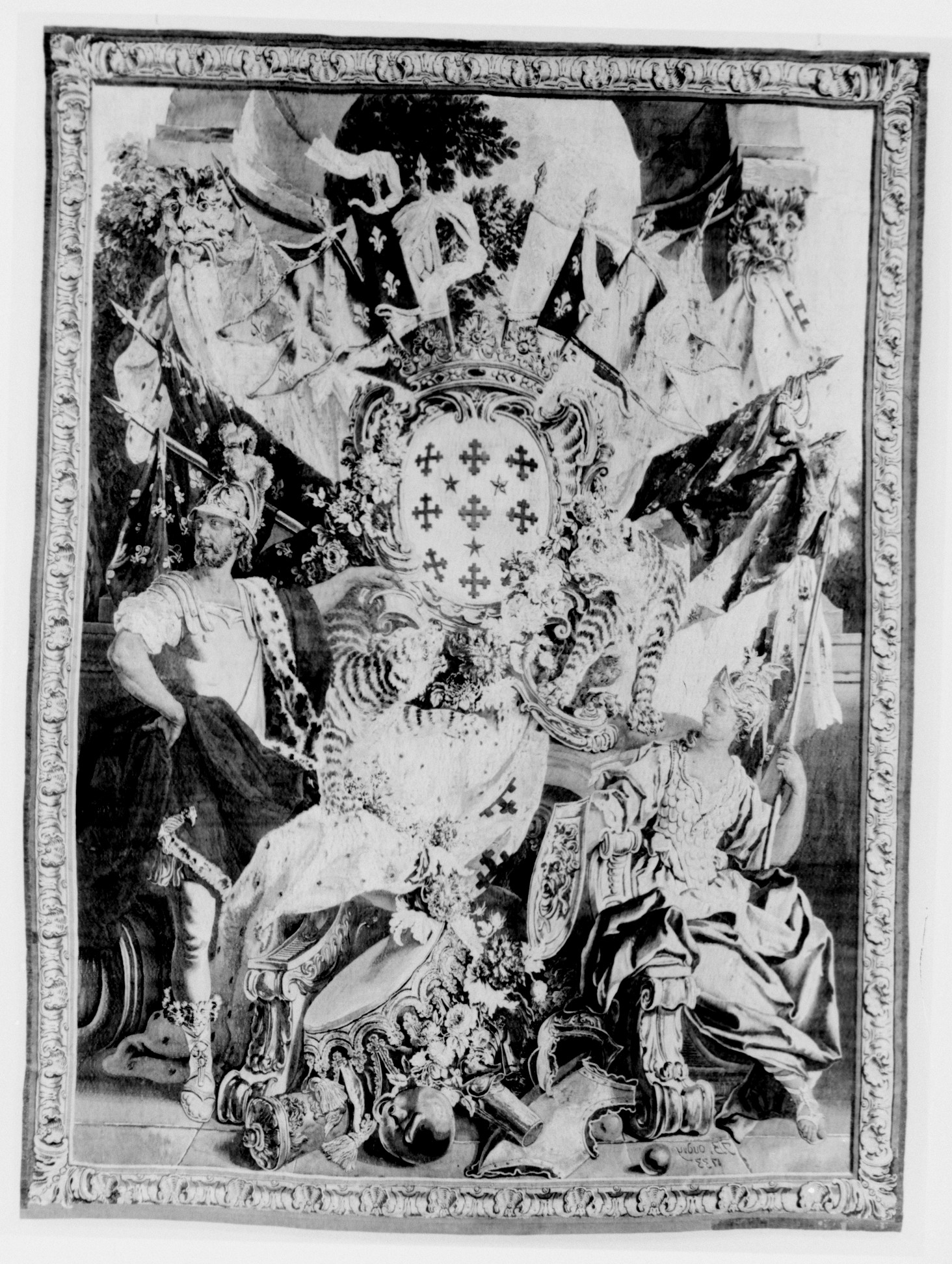
Arms of Joseph Marie, Duke of Boufflers

He fought in the War of the Austrian Succession and was seconded to the army of the Electorate of Bavaria. He was present at the Battle of Prague in November 1741 and the Battle of Sahay in May 1742. Joseph Marie took part in the subsequent defence of Prague and in the French retreat in December 1741.

On 1 January 1743 Joseph Marie was made a knight of the Order of the Holy Spirit; he was later painted by Jean-Marc Nattier wearing the sash of the order. On 1 May 1743 he was assigned to the Army of the Rhine under Marshal Noailles and was wounded on 27 June 1743 at the Battle of Dettingen. In 1744 he was appointed a lieutenant general in the French Royal Army, in which capacity he took part in the siege of Veurne. Later that year he accompanied the king to Alsace and during his stay in Metz as his aide-de-camp. He remained in the role during the siege of Tournai and the subsequent Battle of Fontenoy in May 1745. In 1746 he was again employed in the Army of Flanders as the king's aide-de-camp. He received a separate command and served under Louis François, Prince of Conti at the siege of Mons from 1 June 1746, after which he returned to the king. He later fought at the Battle of Rocoux in October 1746.

Joseph Marie was assigned to the Italian Army as commander of the French troops in the Republic of Genoa in their fight against the Kingdom of Sardinia. He reached the city on 1 May 1747, but died of smallpox on 2 July. He was buried in Genoa.

== Marriage and children ==
On 15 September 1721 he married Madeleine Angélique Neufville, with whom he had two children:

- Joséphine Eulalie de Boufflers (1727–1742), died unmarried aged 14.
- Charles Joseph Marie de Boufflers (1731–1751), 3rd Duke of Boufflers from 1747. He married Marie Anne Philippine de Montmorency-Logny, with whom he had Amélie de Boufflers.

In the second half of the 1730s – and probably until the duke's death in 1747 – the Duke and the Duchesse of Boufflers rented the Hôtel Chanac de Pompadour and made it their residence in Paris. Depending on the source, the Duchess may have purchased the property after her husband's death in 1747.

French nobility
| Preceded by Louis-François de Boufflers | Duke of Boufflers; 1711–1747 | Succeeded by Charles Joseph de Boufflers |
