= Amélie de Boufflers =

French noblewoman guillotined during the French Revolution

Marie-Amélie de Boufflers
- Duchesse de Lauzun, Duchesse de Biron
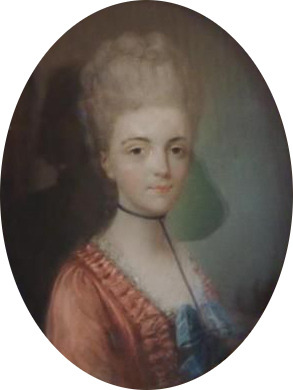
- Amélie de Boufflers
- Born: 5 May 1751; Paris, Kingdom of France
- Died: 27 June 1794 (aged 43); Paris, French First Republic
- Buried: Picpus Cemetery, Paris
- Spouse: Armand Louis de Gontaut (m. 1766)
- Father: Charles-Joseph de Boufflers, duc de Boufflers
- Mother: Marie Anne Philippine de Montmorency-Logny

Marie-Amélie de Boufflers, duchesse de Lauzun (5 May 1751 – 27 June 1794) was a French noblewoman and heiress who was one of the influential princesses combinées at the court of Louis XVI. She was imprisoned and guillotined during the Reign of Terror.

== Early life ==
De Boufflers was born in Paris, the only daughter of Charles-Joseph de Boufflers, last duke of Boufflers, and Marie Anne Philippine de Montmorency-Logny. Her mother was a Dame du Palais to Marie Leszczyńska, while her paternal grandfather was the senior army officer Joseph Marie de Boufflers. De Boufflers was the heiress of her very wealthy paternal grandmother Madeleine Angélique Neufville de Villeroy, who helped to raise her at the Château de Montmorency following her father's premature death.

At the age of ten, she was introduced by her grandmother to Jean-Jacques Rousseau, who recorded the encounter in Confessions and described the young girl as "...a charming person. She really had a face, a sweetness, a virginal shyness. Nothing more amiable and more interesting than her face, nothing more tender and more chaste than the sentiments which she inspired".

== Marriage and court life ==
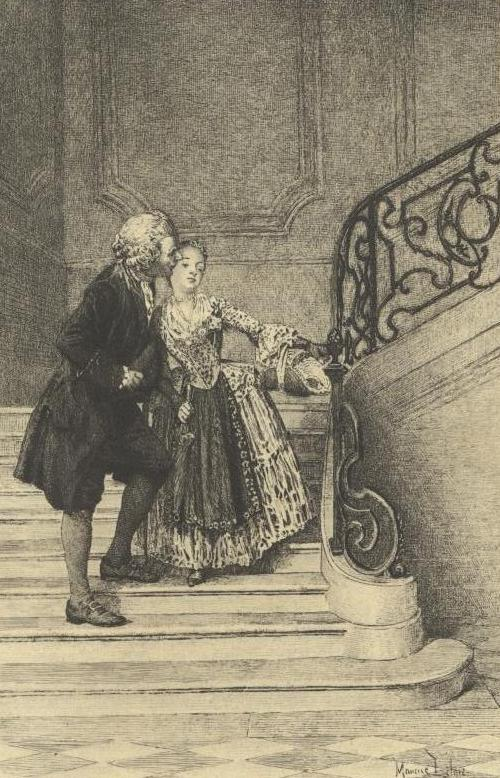
A depiction of Jean-Jacques Rousseau meeting the young Amélie de Boufflers at Château de Montmorency

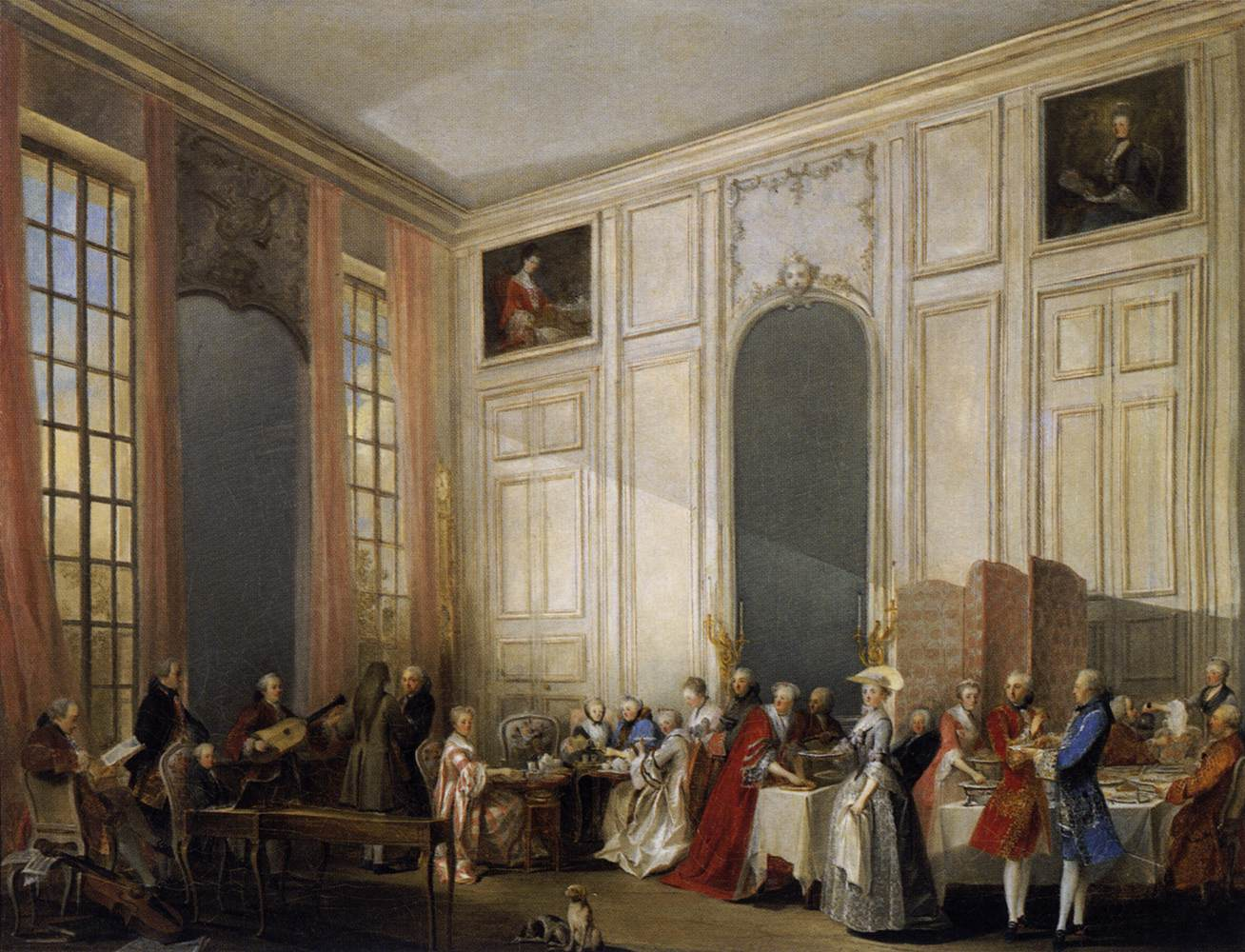
The Duchess of Lauzun depicted alongside other members of the court of Louis XVI in a painting by Michel-Barthélémy Ollivier (1766)

On 4 February 1766, at the age of just 14, she married Armand Louis de Gontaut, Duke of Lauzun at the Hôtel de Luxembourg. The marriage was a failure; after only a few months of marriage, Lauzun had left his wife to pursue other women and the couple never had any children.

Despite the public failure of her marriage, the new Duchess of Lauzun became known throughout French high society for her intelligence, prettiness and charmingly shy manners. She was befriended by Béatrix de Choiseul-Stainville, while her enormous personal wealth ensured that she became a leader of high fashion, particularly the Pouf style. De Boufflers followed the Encyclopédistes and, like other princesses combinées, was known at court for her discretion and intellectual insight as a salonnière. Her rooms at Versailles contained a collection of rare books and manuscripts. From 1788, she held the additional title Duchess of Biron following her husband's elevation to the dukedom and lived at the Hôtel Biron in Paris.

== French Revolution and death ==
Owing to her intimate association with the royal court, de Boufflers became a subject of suspicion after the French Revolution in 1789. She escaped to England for her safety, arriving on 4 November 1789 and being received by Queen Charlotte. In 1791–1792 she spent several months in Lausanne. In England she lived with the Princess of Hénin, wife of Charles-Alexandre de Hénin-Liétard d'Alsace.

The duchess, however, returned to Paris in August 1792 after the Insurrection of 10 August 1792 out of fear that her extensive property would be confiscated by the revolutionary authorities. She was immediately arrested, but soon released owing to the influence and intercession of her husband, who had supported the revolution from its inception. However, following his resignation in disgrace from the French Revolutionary Army and arrest in 1793, de Boufflers was arrested a second time in October 1793 during the Reign of Terror. The Duke of Lauzun was executed in December 1793. After being condemned by Antoine Quentin Fouquier-Tinville alongside the dowager duchesse de Biron, de Boufflers was sentenced to death by the Revolutionary Tribunal. She was guillotined at the Barrière du Trône on 27 June 1794, on the same day as the execution of Anne de Noailles, before being buried in a mass grave of nobles in the Picpus Cemetery.
