= Princesses combinées =

Group of French aristocrats during the reign of Louis XVI

Les princesses combinées ("the combined princesses") was a group of French aristocrats during the reign of Louis XVI. Some authors named two, three or four members of the coterie. They were:

- Adelaïde-Felicité-Henriette Guinot de Mauconseil, princess of Hénin (1750–1820?)
- Anne Louise Marie de Beauvau, princess of Poix
- Marie Amélie de Boufflers, Duchess of Lauzun (1766) then duchess of Biron (1788) (1751–1794)
- Marie-Hedwige de Hesse-Rheinfels-Rotenbourg, princess of Bouillon (1748–1801)
- Diane Adelaide de Damas d'Antigny, countess of Simiane.

They were close friends since childhood. They followed Rousseau, Voltaire and the Encyclopedistes, supported each other and were discreet in their love affairs, contrasting with other ladies of the court. Their social circle included the De Lameth brothers, the duke of Guines and Henriette-Lucy, Marquise de La Tour du Pin Gouvernet.
