= Catherine-Charlotte de Boufflers =

French court official

Catherine Charlotte de Gramont
- Duchess of Boufflers
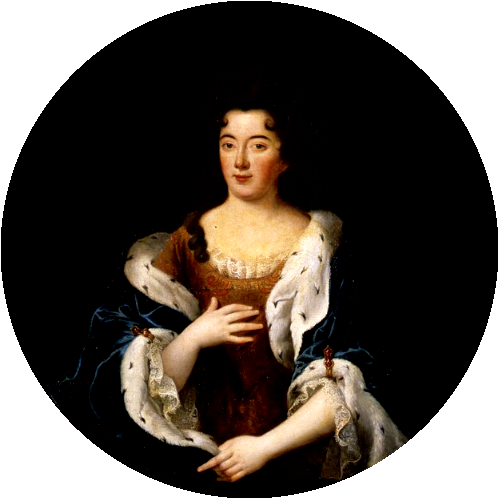
- Full name: Catherine Charlotte de Gramont
- Born: 1670
- Died: 1739 (aged 68–69)
- Spouse: Louis François de Boufflers, 1st Duke of Boufflers (17 December 1693)
- Issue: Joseph Marie, 2nd Duke of Boufflers
- Father: Antoine Charles IV de Gramont
- Mother: Marie Charlotte de Castelnau
- Occupation: Premier lady-in-waiting to Queen Marie of France 1725–1735

Catherine Charlotte de Gramont (1670–1739) was a French court official, foremost known as the Marechale de Boufflers. She served as Première dame d'honneur to the queen of France, Marie Leszczyńska, the wife of King Louis XV, from 1725 until 1735.

== Life ==
Catherine-Charlotte was the daughter of Antoine Charles IV de Gramont and Marie Charlotte de Castelnau, and married duke Louis-François de Boufflers in 1693.

In 1725, she was appointed to the office of Première dame d'honneur to the new queen of France, and as such was responsible for the female courtiers, controlling the budget, purchases, annual account and staff list, the daily routine and presentations to the queen.

Catherine-Charlotte de Boufflers was described as a person known for her strict morals, and her appointment was considered suitable by the king because of her many virtues. Despite the efforts of André-Hercule de Fleury, most of the other office holders to the Queen's Household were appointed because of their rank and loyalty to prime minister Duke de Bourbon and his mistress Madame de Prie, and as such had a reputation of decadence about them as associated with the infamous 'Decadence of the Regency'. Because of the former and contemporary love affairs of many of the other ladies-in-waiting of the queen, such as Amable-Gabrielle de Villars, Catherine-Charlotte de Boufflers was nicknamed as 'Madame Pataclin' after the manager of the Pitié-Salpêtrière Hospital, where women were imprisoned for alleged sexual offences.

She resigned in 1735. She is mentioned in the memoirs of the time.

== Children ==
1. Joseph Marie de Boufflers, 2nd Duke of Boufflers (22 May 1706 – 2 July 1747) had children.

Court offices
Preceded by Anne-Armande de Crequy	Première dame d'honneur to the Queen of France; 1725–1735	Succeeded by Marie Brûlart
