= Madeleine Angélique de Neufville =

French noblewoman, courtier and salonnière

- Duchess of Piney-Luxembourg
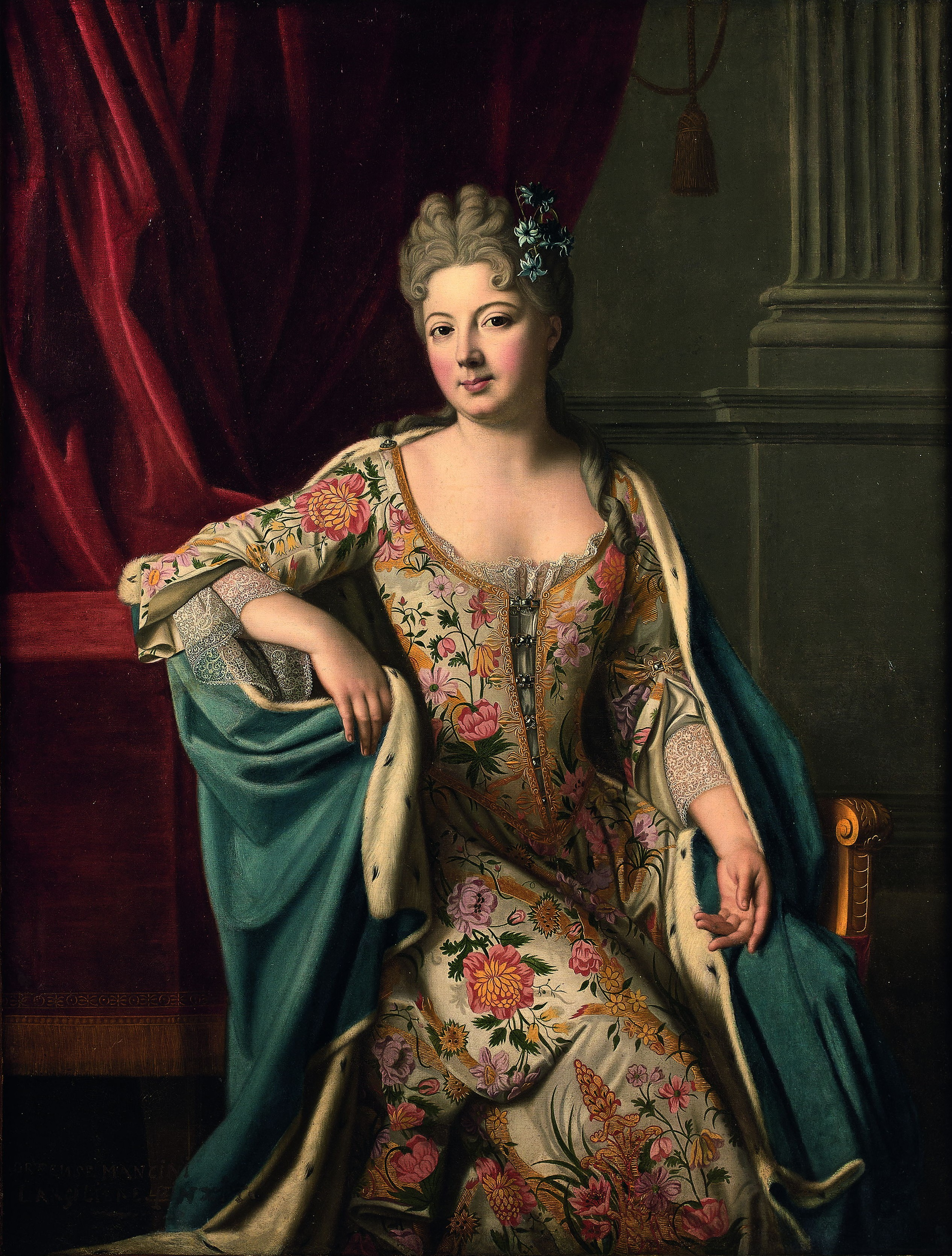
- Portrait of the Maréchale of Luxembourg, 18th century
- Full name: Madeleine Angélique de Neufville
- Other titles: Duchess of Boufflers; Countess of Bouteville, of Lassé, of Dangu and of Luxe
- Born: October 1, 1707; Paris, Kingdom of France
- Died: January 24, 1787 (aged 79); Paris, Kingdom of France
- Noble family: Neufville de Villeroy (by birth); Montmorency (by marriage) de Boufflers (by marriage)
- Spouses: Joseph Marie de Boufflers, Duke of Boufflers (m. 1721; died 1747) Charles II François Frédéric de Montmorency-Luxembourg (m. 1750; died 1765)
- Issue: Charles Joseph de Boufflers Amélie de Boufflers
- Father: Louis Nicolas de Neufville, 3rd Duke of Villeroy
- Mother: Marguerite Le Tellier

Madeleine Angélique de Neufville (1 October 1707‍–‍24 January 1787), known as duchesse de Boufflers from 1721 and as la maréchale de Luxembourg from 1750, was a French noblewoman, courtier and salonnière.

== Biography ==
Madeleine Angélique de Neufville was the daughter of Louis Nicolas de Neufville de Villeroy, 3rd Duke of Villeroy and Marguerite Le Tellier. In 1722, at the age of 15, she married her first husband Joseph Marie de Boufflers, Duke of Boufflers. Their only son, Charles Joseph de Boufflers, married Marie Anne Philippine Thérèse de Montmorency in 1747; their daughter was Amélie de Boufflers.

Between 1734 and 1749 she served as a Dame du Palais to Marie Leszczyńska at Versailles. Villeroy's first husband died in 1747, at which point she purchased the impressive hôtel particulier Hôtel de Besenval. In 1750, she married Charles II François Frédéric de Montmorency-Luxembourg, a Marshal of France and owner of Château de Montmorency. During Villeroy's residence at the chateau she allowed it to become a refuge for Jean-Jacques Rousseau.

Following the death of the Marshal-Duke of Luxembourg in 1764, Villeroy opened her Paris house to the great noble, artistic and literary names of the city, using her enormous fortune from her two marriages to become a major patron of the arts. She died in 1787.
