= Jacques de Mauvisière de Castelnau =

French soldier (1620–1658)

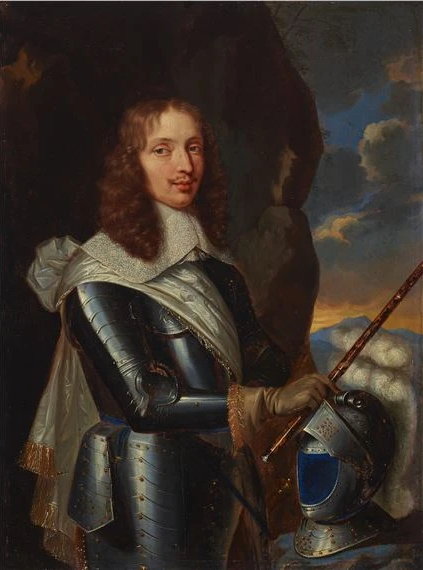
- Born: 1620
- Died: 15 July 1658 (aged 37–38)
- Father: Jacques de Castelnau de La Mauvissière
- Mother: Charlotte Rouxel de Medavy
- Military career
- Allegiance: Kingdom of France
- Rank: Marshal of France
- Wars: Thirty Years' War; Franco-Spanish War; Anglo-Spanish War

Jacques de Castelnau-Bochetel (1620-1658), Marquis de Castelnau, was a 17th-century French aristocrat and soldier. He distinguished himself during the Thirty Years' War as lieutenant general of the King's Armies in Flanders and was elevated to the dignity of Marshal of France 3 weeks before his death.

== Biography ==
Jacques de Castelnau-Bochetel was the third son of Jacques de Castelnau de La Mauvissière and Charlotte Rouxel de Medavy, and grandson of the military, diplomat and memorialist Michel de Castelnau de La Mauvissière.
After the death of his two older brothers, he became the heir to the seigneury of Breuilhamenon.

=== Military career ===
Jacques de Castelnau-Bochetel entered the Army at the age of 14. He fought against the Spanish in the and distinguished himself in 1636 during the Sieges of Corbie and La Capelle, where he was taken prisoner and imprisoned in the citadel of Cambrai from where he escaped.

Wounded in 1638 and again in 1639, he distinguished himself during the Siege of Arras (1640), where he acquired a reputation as a brave and experienced soldier. Cardinal Mazarin entrusted him with the command of the Régiment de Bretagne to serve in Germany under the orders of Louis, Grand Condé. In 1644, he carried out two heroic actions during the Battle of Freiburg.

After the Battle of Nördlingen (1645), he was promoted to maréchal de camp for having taken the village of Alerheim. Back in Flanders in 1646, it was he who led the assault during the siege of Mardyck, and during that of Dunkirk. The King appointed him governor of Brest in 1648. In 1651, he was promoted to lieutenant general, and received the prestigious Order of the Holy Spirit.

In 1658, he commanded the left wing of the French Army, assisted by an English contingent, during the Battle of the Dunes on 14 June. He took Fort Léon from the Spaniards and began consolidation works there to maintain it. It was during an inspection of these works on 16 June 1658, that he was hit by a musket ball which could not be removed. Learning of this injury, the King made him Marshal of France on 20 June 1658. Castelnau could not enjoy this supreme honor for long, since he died of his wound on 15 July 1658. He was only 38 years old.

His body was transported to Bourges where he was buried in the church of the Jacobins.
de Castelnau is remembered with a buste in the Galerie des Batailles in the Palace of Versailles.

=== Marriage and children ===
He married in March 1642 Marie Girard de l'Espinay, they had three children:

- Marie-Madeleine, who died at the age of 12
- Michel, marquis de Castelnau, who took part in the Franco-Dutch War and was mortally wounded in 1672 near Ameide
- Marie-Charlotte, who married Antoine Charles IV de Gramont.

== Sources ==
- Anselm de Guibours : Ange de Sainte-Rosalie: Histoire généalogique et chronologique de la Maison Royale de France, des Pairs, grands officiers de la Couronne. Band 8. 3rd Edition. Libraires associéz, Paris 1733, Page 588.
- Le Marquisat de Castelnau
