= Rocourt, Liège =

Section of Liège, Belgium

Rocourt Rôcou (Walloon)
- Sub-municipality of Liège
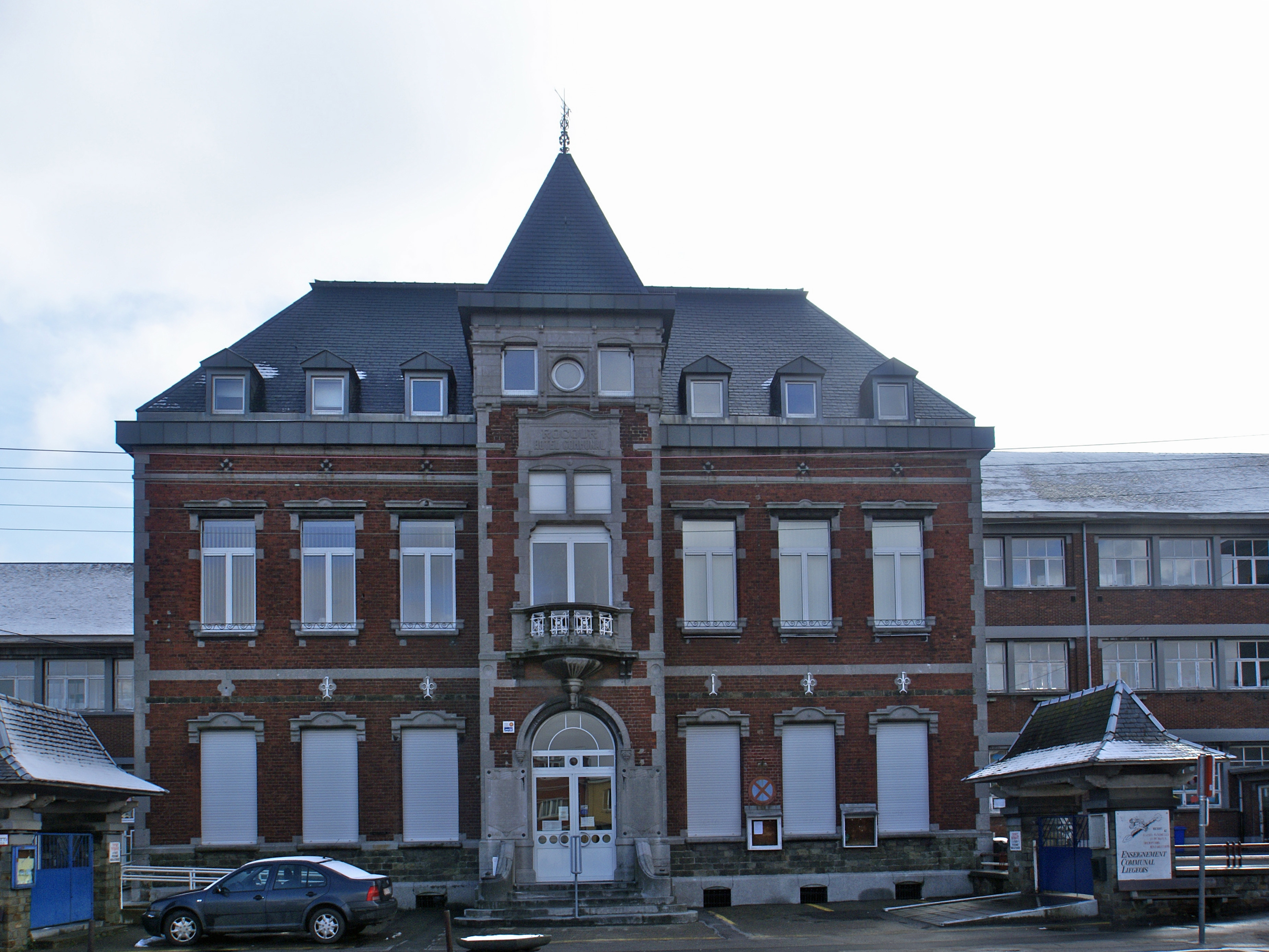
- Former town hall

- Location in Liège
- Interactive map of Rocourt
- Location within Belgium Location within Liège Province
- Coordinates: 50°40′34″N 5°32′47″E
- Country: Belgium
- Community: French Community
- Region: Wallonia
- Province: Liège
- Arrondissement: Liège
- Municipality: Liège

Area
  - Total: 4.28 km^{2} (1.65 sq mi)

Population (2020-01-01)
  - Total: 7,029
  - Density: 1,640/km^{2} (4,250/sq mi)
- Postal codes: 4000
- Area codes: 04

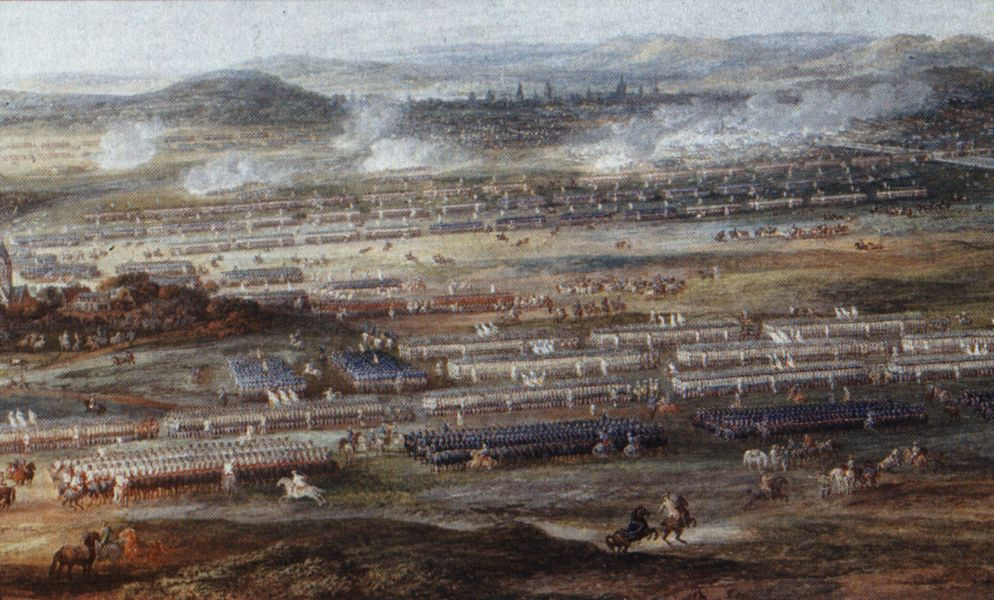
Battle of Rocoux in 1746.

Rocourt (French pronunciation: [ʁɔkuʁ]; Walloon: Rôcou) is a sub-municipality of the city of Liège located in the province of Liège, Wallonia, Belgium. It was a separate municipality until 1977. On 1 January 1977, it was merged into Liège.

Formerly known as Rocoux or Roucoux, it was the site of the battle of Rocoux in 1746, during the War of the Austrian Succession. It is now known for its maternity hospital, one of the biggest in Belgium, where a few famous people were born, such as Justine Henin, Marie Gillain and David Goffin. Rocourt also hosted the stadium of RFC Liège from 1921 until 1995. The football club has played in new stadium in Rocourt since 2015.

At 50°39'42"N 5°34'0"E, there was a mediumwave transmitter of RTBF, which worked on 1233 kHz with a power of 5 kW.
