= Siege of Namur (1746) =

Siege in the War of the Austrian Succession

- Part of War of the Austrian Succession
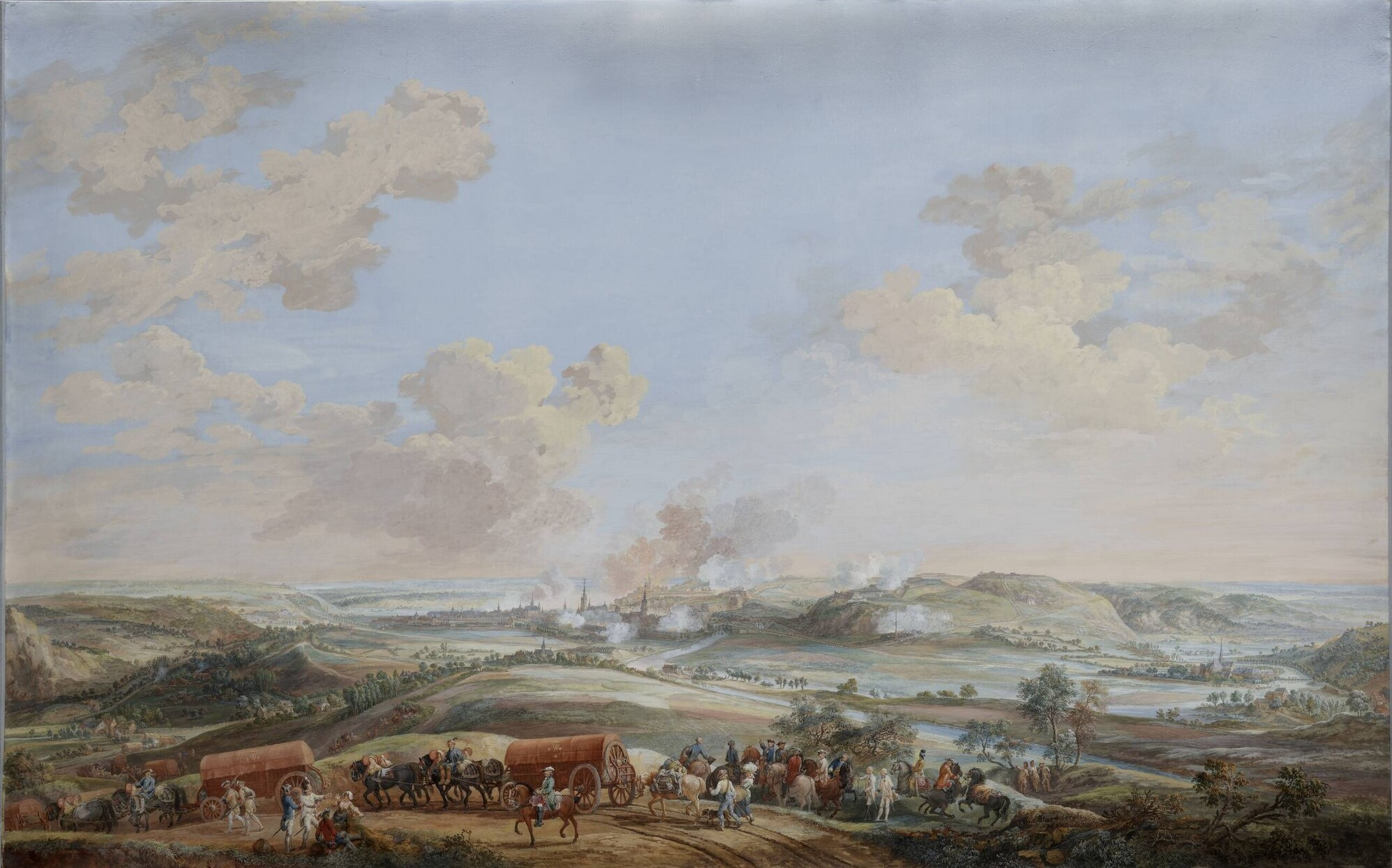
- Siege of the castles of Namur by the Count of Clermont, from 24 to 30 September 1746 by Louis-Nicolas van Blarenberghe, 1782
Date	12–30 September 1746
Location	Namur, Austrian Netherlands 50°28′00″N 4°52′00″E
Result	French victory

Belligerents
France	Dutch Republic

Commanders and leaders
(Kingdom of France) Maurice de Saxe (Kingdom of France) Count of Clermont	(Dutch Republic) Benjamin Crommelin

Strength
100,000	7,000

Casualties and losses
112 killed 369 wounded	7,000 prisoner or killed

The siege of Namur took place between 6 and 30 September 1746, during the War of the Austrian Succession. A French army under the command of Marshal Maurice de Saxe took Namur from its Dutch garrison after a three-week siege.

== Prelude ==
The 1745 campaign had ended with the conquest of Brussels by the French. The 1746 campaign got off to a late start. Despite having 200,000 men in the Austrian Netherlands, the French Supreme commander Marshal Maurice de Saxe decided to avoid a new major battle. The reason was that his troops were dispersed, occupying fortresses and towns across the Austrian Netherlands, and furthermore, the King had given his ambitious kinsman, the Prince of Conti, command over a part of the army.

Therefore, Maurice of Saxe decided to secure more territory, while avoiding major engagements. His objectives were the fortresses of Mons, Charleroi, Namur, and also Maastricht if there was enough time left before winter. The task of conquering Mons and Charleroi was given to the Prince of Conti, and concluded successfully on 23 July (Mons) and 2 August (Charleroi).

Meanwhile, Maurice de Saxe maneuvered his army east to besiege Namur. He gave the command of the siege itself to the Count of Clermont, while himself covered the siege troops with the main army, against the Allied relief army.

== Siege ==
Work on the siege trenches began in the night of 12-13 September, while the artillery bombarded the fortress.

The fortress garrison consisted of twelve Dutch and two Austrian battalions, a total of 7,000 men. They were under the command of Count Colyar, who left the fortress already on 13 September due to his advanced age and health problems and handed over command to General Benjamin Crommelin.

The city itself was attacked at the Porte de Saint-Nicolas. The French established two batteries opposite the advanced forts Saint-Antoine and Espinois. On the night of 18–19 September, the besiegers had already taken control of the outer works; only Fort Coquelet and the Jambes bridgehead were still in the hands of the besieged. At daybreak, the garrison left Fort Jambes, blowing up three arches of the bridge over the Meuse behind them.

On 18 September at 07:00, Fort Coquelet also surrendered with 300 prisoners being taken, and at 11:00, the town followed.

The French now began to attack the fortress proper above the town, where the remaining garrison had retreated. Batteries of siege guns were positioned opposite the citadel, the Terre Neuve outpost and Fort Orange (called Fort Willjam on the map). Fire was opened on the afternoon of 24 September. A shell exploded the Dutch powder magazine, destroying numerous buildings, including the church of Saint-Pierre.

By the end of September, artillery had breached the walls of Fort Orange and the citadel, and preparations were being made for the final attack. Before this happened, the besieged raised the white flag at 18:00 on 30 September. The garrison was taken prisoner of war.

== Aftermath ==
With winter approaching, Maurice de Saxe planned to move his troops into their winter quarters, but then he was informed that the main Allied army was camped in a vulnerable position between Liège, the Meuse and the Jeker rivers. He decided to attack the enemy army with all available forces, which led to the Battle of Roucoux on 11 October 1746.

The French evacuated Namur two years later after the signing of the Treaty of Aix-la-Chapelle (1748).

== Sources ==
- Browning, Reed. The War of the Austrian Succession. Alan Sutton Publishing, 1994.
- Painting by Louis Nicolas Van Blarenberghe in the Louvre Museum
- Royal Collection Trust : military map : Encampments at Namur, 1746
