= The Outer Harbor of Brest =

1777 painting by Henri Joseph van Blarenberghe

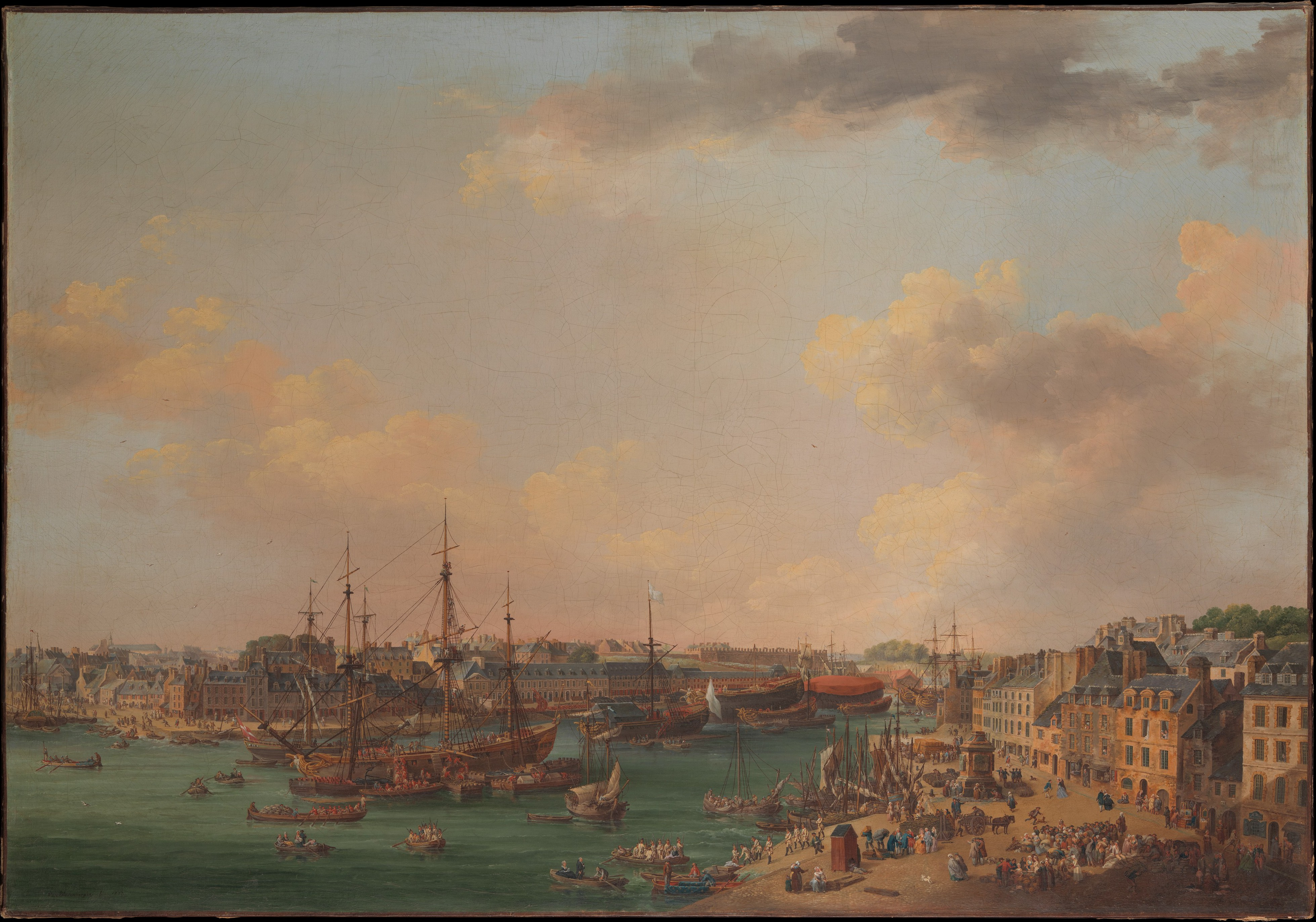
- Artist: Henri Joseph van Blarenberghe
- Year: 1777
- Medium: Oil on canvas
- Subject: Brest, France
- Dimensions: 74.3 cm × 107 cm (29.3 in × 42 in)
- Location: Metropolitan Museum of Art; New York City

The Outer Harbor of Brest is an 18th-century painting by Flemish artist Henri Joseph van Blarenberghe, a member of the influential Blarenberghe family of painters. Done in oil on canvas, the work depicts naval activity in the French port of Brest. The work is one of 6 paintings van Blarenberghe produced at the behest of the French government.

== History ==
In the 1750s, the French government commissioned Flemish painter Henri Joseph van Blarenberghe to produce a number of paintings concerning various ports in France. However, the project ended before the artist was able to produce a work concerning the port of Brest in Brittany. A decade later, van Blarenberghe and his son (Nicolas van Blarenberghe) were tasked by the French secretary of state for the navy to produce a set of works depicting Brest, which had recently been rebuilt; the secretary hoped that van Blarenberghe's works would show the French king the successful rebuilding of the French naval station in the port city. In total, six studies were produced by the van Blarneberghe's, one of which is Outer Harbor.
