= Château de Montmorency (Val-d'Oise) =

Coordinates: 48.9816°N 2.31896°E

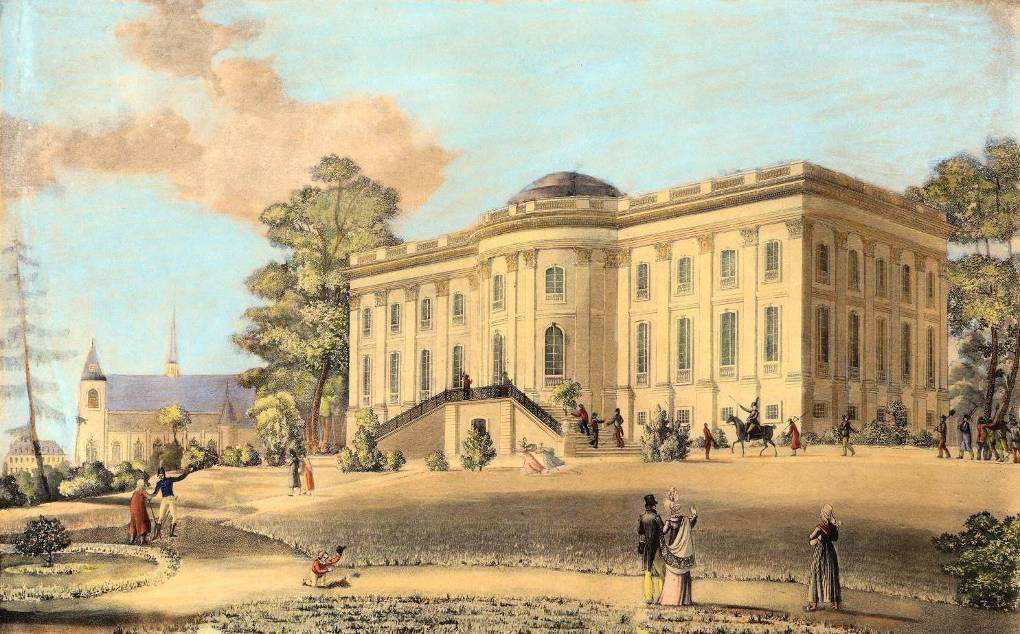
Crozat's Château de Montmorency

The Château de Montmorency was an 18th-century mansion in Montmorency, Val-d'Oise of which today only a few vestiges remain.

== History ==
In 1670, Charles Le Brun, the first painter to King Louis XIV, acquired some land on which he built his country house, later called the "petit château" (small house).

Following Le Brun's death in 1690, the property was bought in 1702 by the financier and art collector Pierre Crozat who had his own magnificent "grand château" (large house) built within the park to a design by the architect Jean-Sylvain Cartaud.

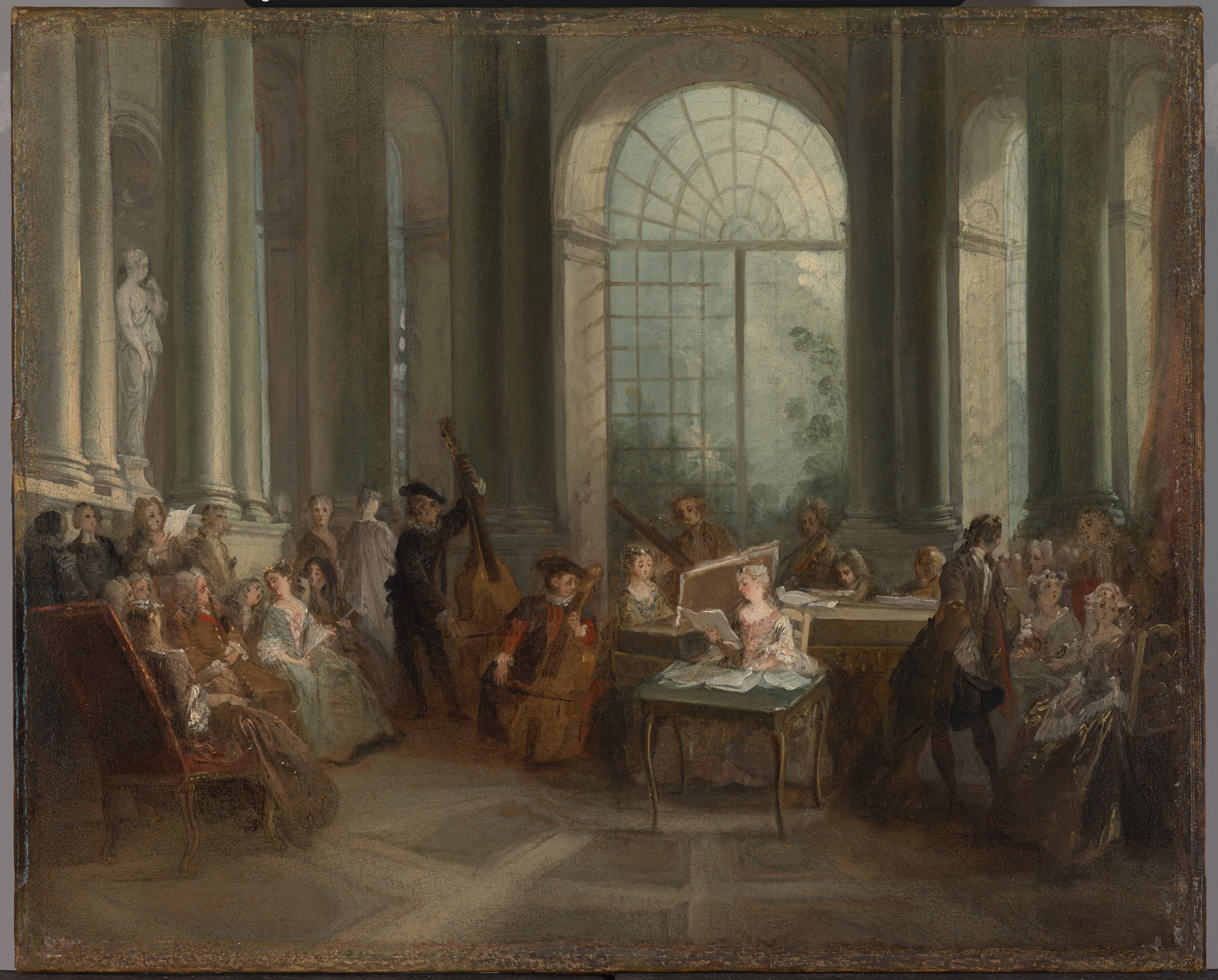
Concert in the Oval Salon of Pierre Crozat's Château de Montmorency (c. 1720–1724) by Nicolas Lancret

He turned his country seat into the centre of social gatherings which inspired Crozat's protégé Antoine Watteau for some of his paintings.

Crozat had an Orangery built by Gilles-Marie Oppenordt which survives today as the town's music conservatory.

== Description ==
Crozat's grand château contained a chapel decorated in 1715-16 by Pierre Le Gros the Younger and paintings by Charles de La Fosse. The building was demolished in 1817.

From 1759 to 1762, the French philosopher Jean-Jacques Rousseau resided here under the protection of Charles II François Frédéric de Montmorency-Luxembourg and Madeleine Angélique Neufville.
