= Sampson Staniforth =

English Wesleyan Methodist preacher

Sampson Staniforth (December 1720 – 1799) was an English Methodist preacher and soldier.

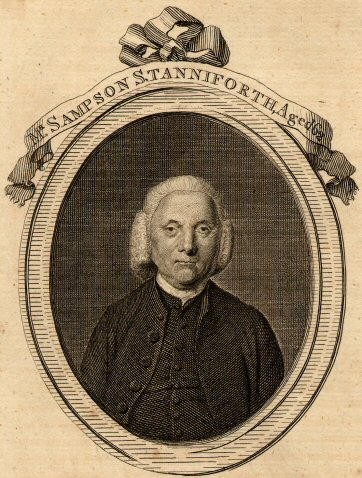
Sampson Staniforth

== Biography ==
Staniforth was born in December 1720 in Sheffield, England. His father, Samuel, was a cutler in the city. He enlisted in the army in 1739, serving during the War of the Austrian Succession. He served in Flanders and was said to have been introduced to one of John Haime's converts. Following the Battle of Fontenoy, he returned to England in 1745. He was stationed in Deptford and witnessed John Wesley preach in London.

In 1748, Staniforth left the army, building a preaching house in 1757. In 1764 he was ordained by the Greek Bishop Erasmus of Arcadia, however he did not use his credentials. In 1771 following encouragement from John Wesley, he established another preaching house in Rotherhithe.

He died in Deptford in 1799.
