= Antoine Charles de Gramont, 3rd Duke of Gramont =

French diplomat

Antoine Charles de Gramont
- 3rd Duke of Gramont
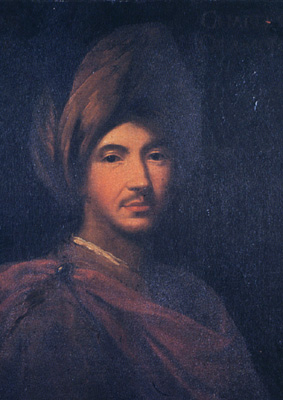
- Full name: Antoine Charles
- Born: 1641
- Died: 25 October 1720 (aged 79)
- Spouses: Marie Charlotte de Castelnau; Anne Baillet de La Cour
- Issue: Catherine-Charlotte de Boufflers
- Father: Antoine de Gramont, Duke of Gramont
- Mother: Françoise Marguerite du Plessis

Antoine Charles de Gramont, 3rd Duke of Gramont (1641 - 25 October 1720) was a French nobleman comte de Guiche, comte de Louvigny, Souverain de Bidache who served as a diplomat. His senior title was Duke of Gramont.

== Early life ==
He was the youngest son of Antoine III de Gramont and Françoise-Marguerite du Plessis de Chivré (d. 2 May 1689), Cardinal Richelieu's niece.

== Biography ==
He distinguished himself in the King's armies during the campaign against Holland in 1672 and during the Siege of Besançon (1674) in the Franco-Dutch War. Later he was Ambassador extraordinary in Spain, Viceroy of Navarre and Béarn, and governor of Bayonne.
He was a Knight of the King's order and Knight of the Golden Fleece.

== Personal life ==
In 1668 he married Marie Charlotte de Castelnau (1648 – 29 January 1694), daughter of Marshal Castelnau.
They had two children :

- Catherine-Charlotte de Boufflers (c. 1670–1739), lady-in-waiting, married Louis François, duc de Boufflers
- Antoine V de Gramont (1672–1725), 4th Duke of Gramont.

After his wife died, he married Anne Baillet de La Cour (1665-1737) in 1710. They had one child:

- NN de Gramont (b. 1704 - d. before 1720)

== Ancestors ==
Ancestors of Antoine Charles de Gramont, 3rd Duke of Gramont

16. Antoine de Gramont, Count of Guiche
8. Philibert de Gramont, Count of Guiche
17. Hélène de Clermont
4. Antoine, Duke de Gramont
18. Paul d'Andoins, Baron of Andoins, Count of Louvigny
9. Diane d'Andoins
19. Anne Marguerite de Cauna
2. Antoine, Duke de Gramont
20. Géraud de Roquelaure, Lord of Roquelaure
10. Antoine de Roquelaure
21. Catherine de Bezolles
5. Louise de Roquelaure
22. Jacques Claude d'Ornesan, Lord of Auradé
11. Catherine d'Ornesan
23. Brunette de Cornil, Dame de Moulin d'Armac
1. Antoine de Gramont, Comte de Louvigny
24. Jacques de Chivré, seigneur du Plessis
12. François de Chivré, seigneur du Plessis
25. Jeanne Le Hesnault, Dame de Bouillé
6. Hector de Chivré, seigneur du Plessis
26. François de la Porte, Lord of Boissier
13. Léonore de la Porte
27. Madeleine Charles
3. Françoise Marguerite du Plessis de Chivré
28. François de Connan, Lord of Coulon and Rabastan
14. Nicolas de Connan, Lord of Rabastan
29. Jeanne Hennequin du Perray
7. Marie de Connan
30. Charles d'O, Lord of Vérigny
15. Anne d'O
31. Jacqueline Girard

== See also ==
- Gramont

French nobility
Preceded by Antoine III	Duke of Gramont; 1678–1720	Succeeded by Antoine V
