= Siege of Brussels =

1746 siege

- Part of War of the Austrian Succession
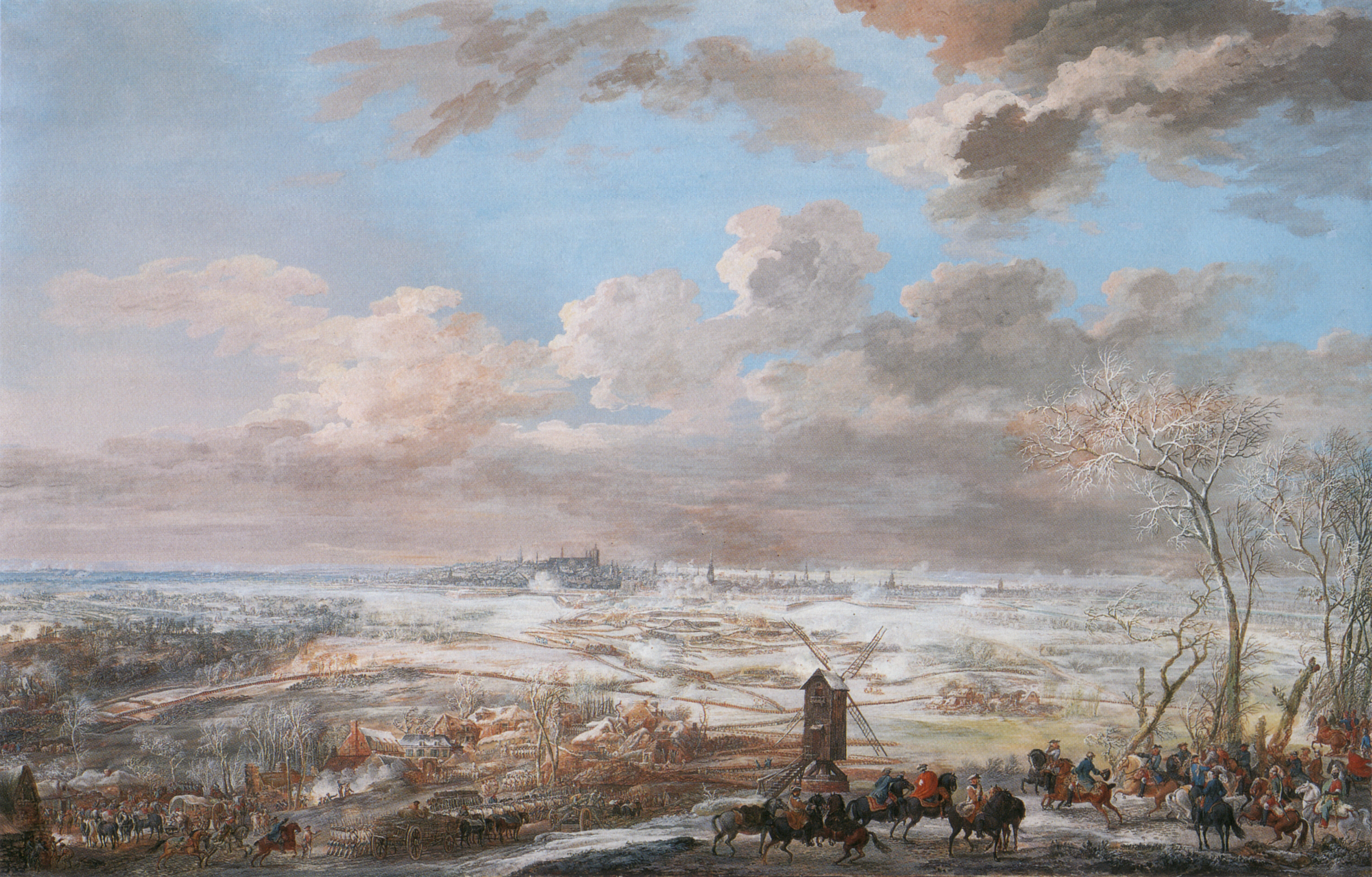
- Painting of the battle by Louis-Nicolas van Blarenberghe
Date	January – February 1746
Location	Brussels, Austrian Netherlands
Result	French victory

Belligerents
France	Austria

Commanders and leaders
(Kingdom of France) Maurice de Saxe	(Habsburg monarchy) Count Kaunitz (Habsburg monarchy) Count Eugène de Lannoy de la Motterie

Strength
22,000	12,000

The siege of Brussels took place between January and February 1746 during the War of the Austrian Succession. A French army under the overall command of Maurice de Saxe, in a bold and innovative winter campaign besieged and captured the city of Brussels, which was then the capital of the Austrian Netherlands, from its Austrian garrison.

The French were boosted by the fact that a large part of the Allied army was forced to return to Britain where a Jacobite Rising of 1745 had broken out and Bonnie Prince Charlie had won a stunning victory at the Battle of Prestonpans. This left very few troops to actively oppose the French forces. After the French made two breaches in the walls of Brussels, the Austrian defenders were compelled to surrender on 22 February in a siege that lasted just three weeks.

The governor of the Austrian Netherlands, Count Kaunitz, was forced to withdraw his administration north to Antwerp. The siege severely damaged his view of Austria's allies, principally Britain and the Dutch Republic, who he considered had done virtually nothing to protect Brussels from the French. A decade later Kaunitz would be one of the architects of the Franco-Austrian Alliance in which Austria abandoned its former alliance with Britain and joined with its traditional enemy France.

The French followed up the capture of Brussels by taking other key cities and fortresses in the Austrian Netherlands including Mons and Namur. Brussels remained under French occupation until it was returned to Austria by the 1748 Treaty of Aix-la-Chapelle along with the rest of the Austrian Netherlands, although it was January 1749 before the French finally evacuated the city.
