= Battle of Rocoux =

1746 battle during the War of the Austrian Succession

- Part of the War of the Austrian Succession
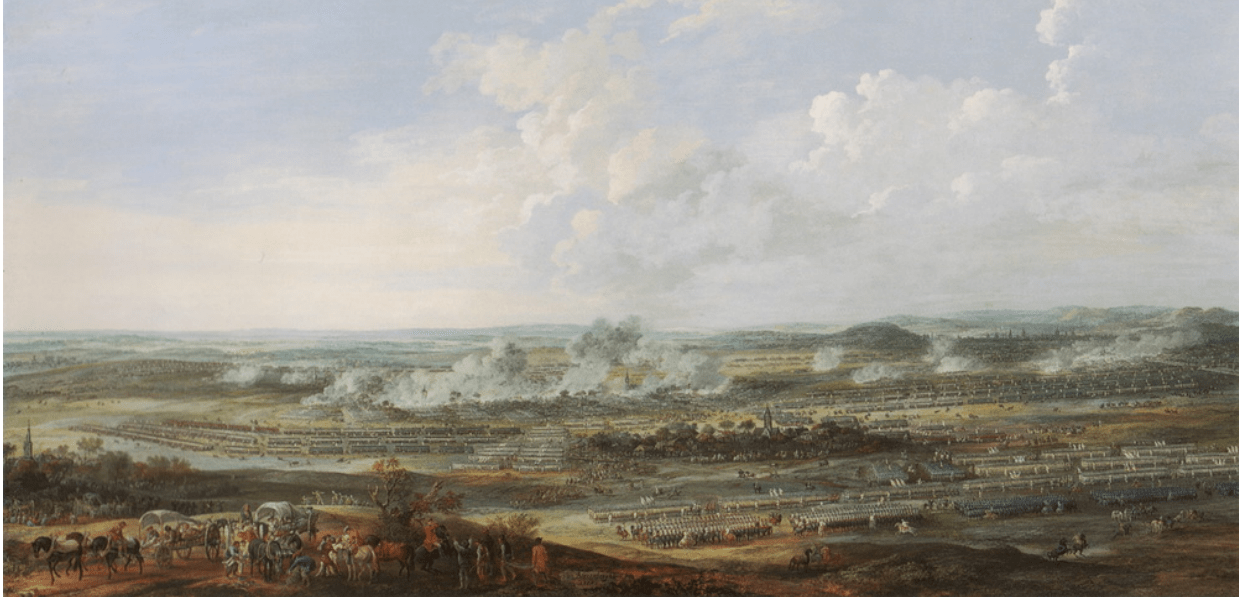
- Battle of Roucoux, 1746 by Louis-Nicolas van Blarenberghe, 1784
Date	11 October 1746
Location	Rocourt, Prince-Bishopric of Liège, Austrian Netherlands
Result	French victory

Belligerents
France	Austria; Great Britain (Province of Hanover) Hanover; Dutch Republic

Commanders and leaders
(Kingdom of France) Maurice de Saxe (Kingdom of France) Clermont-Tonnerre (Kingdom of France) Count Lowendahl (Kingdom of France) de Contades	(Habsburg monarchy) Charles of Lorraine (Habsburg monarchy) József Batthyány (Kingdom of Great Britain) Earl Ligonier (Dutch Republic) Prince Waldeck (Province of Hanover) Ludwig von Zastrow

Strength
100,000 to 120,000	70,000 to 100,000

Casualties and losses
3,000 to 4,000 dead or wounded	8,000–10,000 dead, wounded, or captured

The Battle of Rocoux took place on 11 October 1746 during the War of the Austrian Succession, near Rocourt, Liège in Belgium. It was fought between a French army under Marshal Saxe and a combined British, Dutch, German and Austrian force led by Charles of Lorraine, Earl Ligonier and Prince Waldeck.

Despite a series of victories in Flanders, by 1746 France was struggling to finance the war, and opened bilateral peace negotiations with Britain at the Congress of Breda in August. While Rocoux confirmed French control of the Austrian Netherlands, Saxe failed to achieve a decisive victory, and the two armies went into winter quarters to prepare for a new campaign in 1747.

== Background ==
When the War of the Austrian Succession began in 1740, Britain was still fighting the War of Jenkins' Ear with Spain; from 1739 to 1742, the main area of operations was in the Caribbean. British and Dutch troops initially fought as part of the Pragmatic Army; it was not until March 1744 that France formally declared war on Britain, while the Dutch Republic officially remained neutral until 1747.

French victory at Fontenoy in April 1745 was followed by the capture of the key ports of Ostend, Ghent and Nieuwpoort, while the Jacobite rising of 1745 forced the British to transfer troops to Scotland. In early 1746, the French took Leuven, Brussels and Antwerp, but they were close to financial collapse, prompting Foreign Minister d'Argenson to open peace talks.

The British still hoped to retrieve their position, and in April, Ligonier assumed command of British and Hanoverian troops for a new offensive in the Austrian Netherlands. However, Austria had acquired these territories in 1713 largely by default, and had little interest in fighting to regain them, while Dutch trade was badly affected by the war. These factors played an important role in the 1746 campaign.

== Battle ==
The Austrian Netherlands and Southern Dutch Republic; key locations 1746–1748

Often referred to as Flanders, the Austrian Netherlands was a compact area 160 kilometres wide, the highest point only 100 metres above sea level, and dominated by canals and rivers. Until the 19th century, commercial and military goods were largely transported by water and wars in this theatre generally fought for control of rivers such as the Lys, Sambre and Meuse.

In mid-July, the Pragmatic Army prepared to defend Namur; leaving the Prince de Conti to finish with Charleroi, Saxe cut their supply lines, forcing them to retreat. By late September, Namur had fallen and the Allies moved to protect Liège, the next town on the Meuse. Most estimates of the numbers suggest between 70,000 and 75,000 Allied troops faced a French force of 110,000 to 120,000.

Anchored on the left by the Liège suburbs, the Allied line ran through Rocoux to the River Jeker; the Dutch under Waldeck held the left, the British and Germans (Note: Primarily consisting of Hanoverian and Hessian troops) in the centre and the Austrians, who formed the largest part of the army, on the right. The Allied position was divided by several rivers and deep ravines, making the movement of troops across it almost impossible; in the ensuing battle, this meant the Austrians played little part in the heavy fighting which took place on the Allied left and centre.

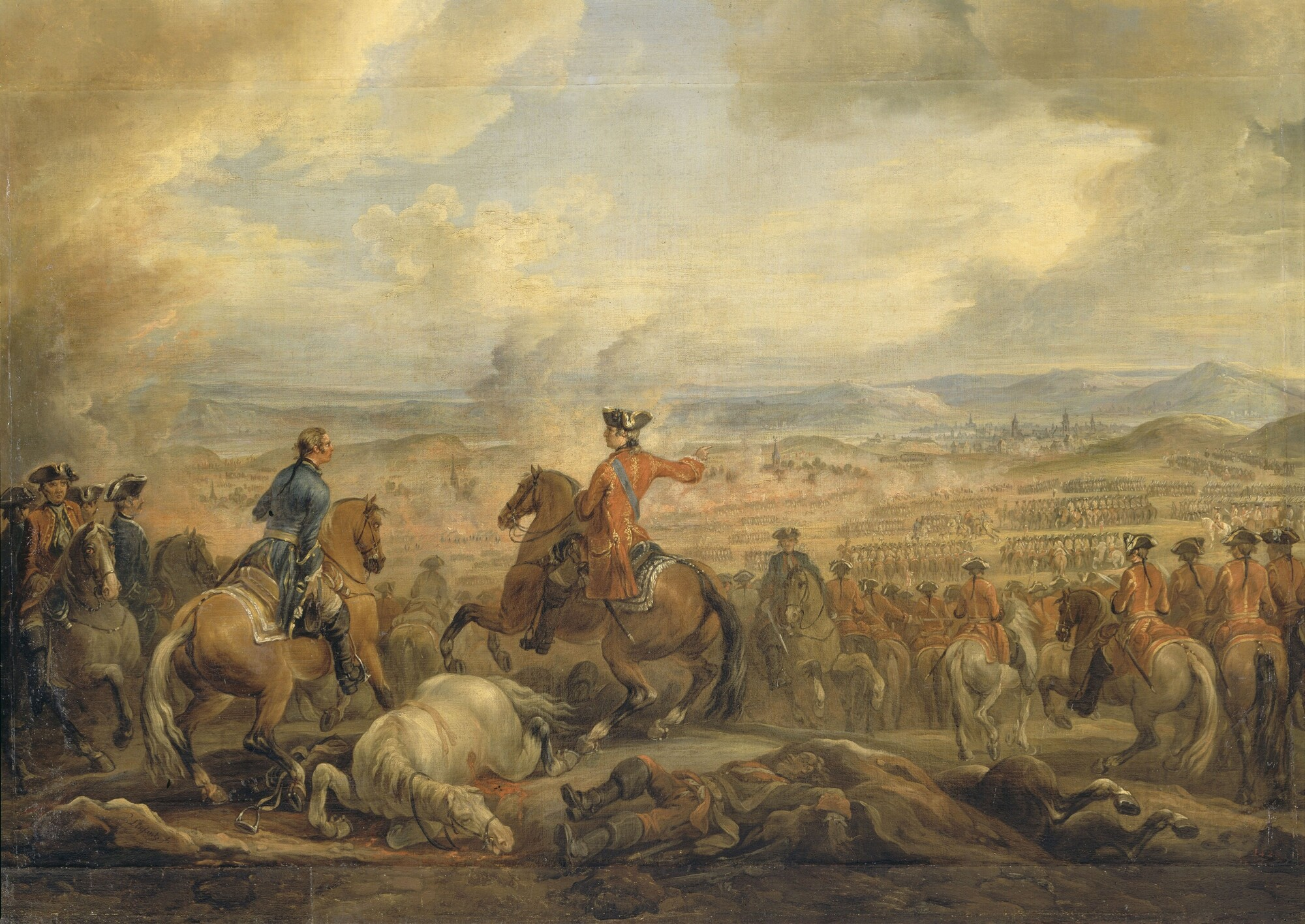
Battle of Rocoux, by Pierre-Nicolas Lenfant

French cavalry made contact with the Austrian outposts around 18:00 on 10 October, then halted for the night, and camped outside Liège. Knowing they were substantially outnumbered, Charles of Lorraine ordered the baggage train across the Meuse to allow an orderly retreat, and Ligonier's troops fortified the villages of Rocoux, Varoux and Liers. Saxe decided to attack the Allied left and centre, leaving a small screening force to pin down the Austrians on the right.

A night of heavy rain was followed by thick mist and so the French did not begin the battle until the weather cleared around 10:00 am, when their artillery opened fire on the British and Dutch positions. At the same time, two columns led by Clermont-Tonnerre and Lowendahl prepared a frontal attack. After the Liège authorities opened the town gates, a third column under de Contades moved through the town and outflanked Waldeck, who re-aligned his troops to face this threat. Completing these movements delayed the main French assault until 15:00 and the Dutch put up strong resistance, particularly around the village of Ance, which they finally lost after two hours of heavy fighting. (Note: British officer Jean-Louis Ligonier about the Dutch: "...Attack'd our army yesterday by our left flank, where after a long resistance the Hollanders behaving extreamly well, were however forc'd by numbers") (Note: Extract of a Letter from a Dutch Officer, Relating to the Action near Liege. "The affair that we had yesterday with the French begun in the evening. The fire which the enemy made upon us from their mask'd batteries, and otherwise, was one of the most terrible ever seen, and it look'd as if hell had opened her mouth to swallow us up. As I was of the rear-guard, and among the hindmost of my troop, in retiring from the field of battle, 'tis a miracle I escaped. As the stragglers come in, we hope to make some abatement in the number said to be lost.") Counter-attacks by the Dutch cavalry eventually allowed their infantry to pull back in good order. Waldeck took up a new position behind the road to Tongeren which he hoped to retain. The order in which his troops had been withdrawn gave him some cause for confidence.

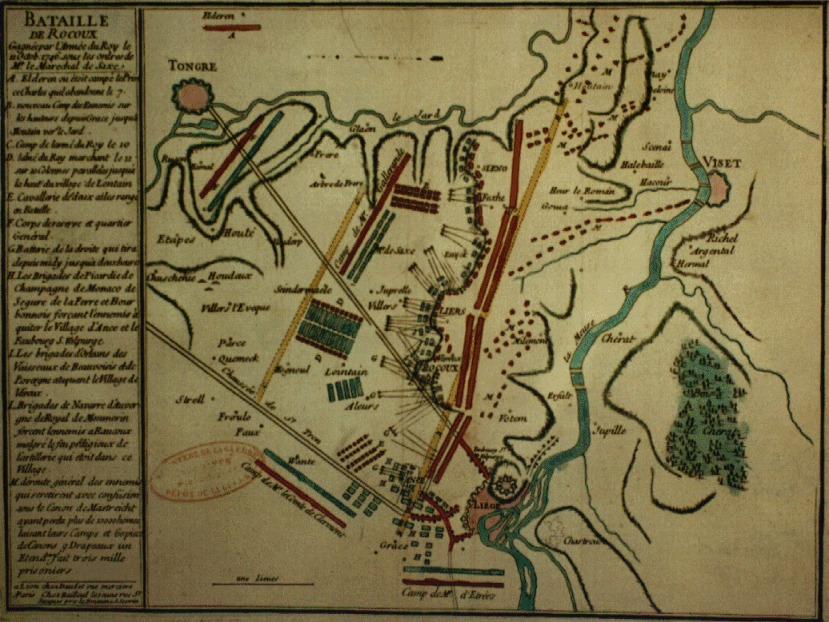
Battle of Rocoux

A second French attack was made against the British-German troops in the centre, who were driven out of their fortified positions in Rocoux and Vercoux, before regrouping further back. (Note: A letter from Sampson Staniforth, a soldier in Graham's Foot reads; "We marched a mile forward into little parks and orchards, a village being between us and our army: here we remained about three hours, while their right wing was engaged with the Dutch, the cannon playing every where all this time. But we were all endued with strength and courage from God, so that the fear of death was taken away from us. And when the French came upon us, and overpowered us, we were troubled at our regiment's giving way, and would have stood our ground, and called to the rest to stop and face the enemy, but to no purpose. In the retreat we were broke; yet after we had retreated about a mile, we rallied twice and fired again. We marched a good part of the night and the next day, about four o'clock, we came to this camp.") Although Von Zastrow retained Liers, British and German infantry withdrew towards the Meuse, covered by the Austrians, who had not been directly engaged. Now that Waldeck was in danger of being cut off from the right wing, he too had to decide to retreat and abandoned his new positions. George II later criticised Charles of Lorraine for allegedly failing to support the British and Dutch, but Ligonier said he had acted in accordance with the plan agreed by the Allied leadership the night before.

Saxe decided it was too late in the day to continue the attack, allowing his opponents to retreat with little interference. The British, Germans and Dutch crossed the Meuse on three Pontoon bridges, while the Austrians withdrew over the Jeker, before heading for Maastricht. Estimates of casualties vary, French losses being around 3,000 to 4,000 killed or wounded, those of the Allies between 8,000 and 10,000, including 3,000 prisoners.

== Aftermath ==
Although Rocoux led to the capture of Liège, and opened the way for an attack on the Dutch Republic, a well-organised retreat conducted by the Allies prevented Saxe from achieving a decisive victory. Led by the Marquis de Puisieux, France began bilateral negotiations with Britain at Breda in August 1746. These proceeded slowly, since the British envoy Lord Sandwich was under instructions to delay, hoping their position in Flanders would improve. In the January 1747 Hague Convention, Britain agreed to fund Austrian and Sardinian forces in Italy, and an Allied army of 140,000 in Flanders, increasing to 192,000 in 1748.

However, by late 1746, Austrian forces had expelled Spanish Bourbon troops from Northern Italy and neither France nor Spain could afford to continue funding their campaign. With the removal of this threat, Maria Theresa of Austria wanted peace to restructure her administration and allegedly used her British subsidies to pay for infrastructure projects in Vienna. Hoping to retrieve the position in Flanders, the Duke of Newcastle persuaded his allies to make another attempt, which ended with defeat at Lauffeld in July 1747.

== Sources ==
- Bodart, Gaston (1908). Militär-historisches Kriegs-Lexikon (1618–1905).
- Bosscha, Johannes (1838). Neêrlands heldendaden te land, van de vroegste tijden af tot in onze dagen (in Dutch). Suringar.
- Castex, Jean-Claude (2012). Dictionnaire des batailles franco-anglaises de la Guerre de Succession d'Autriche (in French). Phare-Ouest. ISBN 978-2921668064.
- Childs, John (1991). The Nine Years' War and the British Army, 1688–1697: The Operations in the Low Countries (2013 ed.). Manchester University Press. ISBN 978-0719089961.
- Goodman, Paul R (Spring 2020). "The Battle of Rocoux, 11 October 1746; Three Other Rank Accounts". Journal of the Society for Army Historical Research. 98 (392): 24–32. JSTOR 27024825.
- Hochedlinger, Michael (2003). Austria's Wars of Emergence, 1683-1797. Routledge. ISBN 978-0582290846.
- Lambotte, Miguel (2000). La bataille de Rocourt: 1746 (in French). éditions du Céfal.
- Lindsay, JO (1957). International Relations in The New Cambridge Modern History: Volume 7, The Old Regime, 1713–1763. Cambridge University Press. ISBN 978-0521045452.
- Nimwegen, Olaf van (2002). De Republiek der Verenigde Nederlanden als grote mogendheid: Buitenlandse politiek en oorlogvoering in de eerste helft van de achttiende eeuw en in het bijzonder tijdens de Oostenrijkse Successieoorlog (1740–1748) (in Dutch). De Bataafsche Leeuw. ISBN 978-9067075404.
- Périni, Hardÿ de (1896). Batailles françaises; Volume VI (in French). Ernest Flammarion.
- Rodger, NAM (1993). The Insatiable Earl: A Life of John Montagu, Fourth Earl of Sandwich, 1718-1792. Harper Collins. ISBN 978-0099526391.
- Scott, Hamish (2015). The Birth of a Great Power System, 1740-1815. Routledge. ISBN 978-1138134232.
- Skrine, Francis H (1905). Fontenoy and Great Britain's Share in the War of the Austrian Succession 1741—1748 (2022 ed.). Legare Street Press. ISBN 978-1016209458.
- Smollett, Tobias (1796). History of England, from the Revolution to the Death of George II: Volume III. T Capel.
- Wood, Stephen (2004). "Ligonier, John [formerly Jean-Louis de Ligonier], Earl Ligonier". Oxford Dictionary of National Biography (online ed.). Oxford University Press. doi:10.1093/ref:odnb/16693. (Subscription, Wikipedia Library access or UK public library membership required.)
- "Battle of Rocoux". Britishbattles.com.
- "British Journals: Letters on the Battle of Rocoux, 1746". Kabinettskriege. 2 April 2015.
- White, Jon (1962). Marshal of France: The Life and Times of Maurice de Saxe (2011 ed.). Literary Licensing. ISBN 978-1258033590.
