= Siege of Mons (1746) =

Siege during the War of the Austrian Succession

- Part of the War of the Austrian Succession
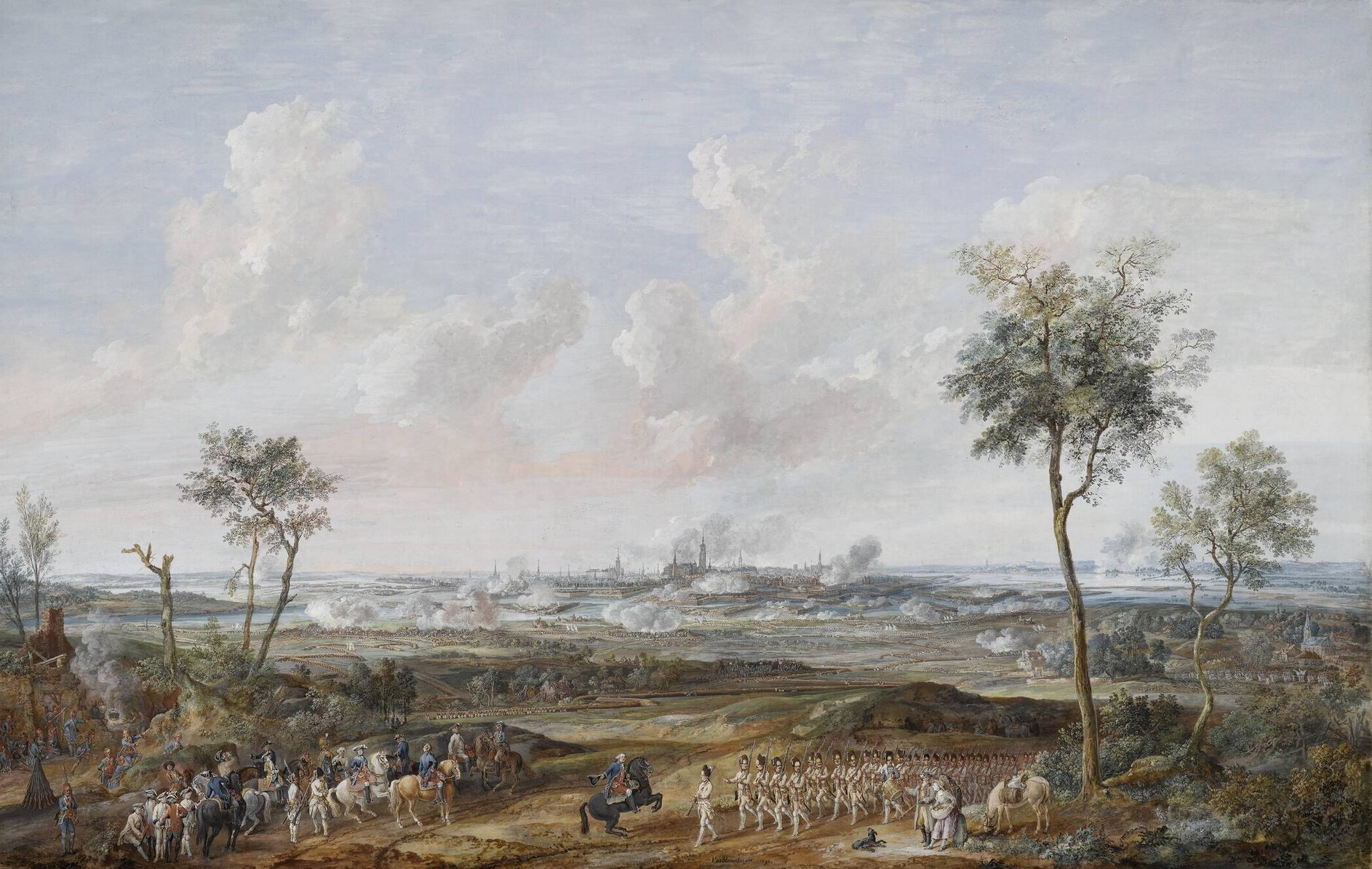
- Siege of Mons by Louis-Nicolas van Blarenberghe, 1790
Date	7 June – 23 July 1746
Location	Mons, Austrian Netherlands (present-day Belgium)
Result	French victory

Belligerents
France	Austria; Dutch Republic

Commanders and leaders
(Kingdom of France) Prince of Conti; (Kingdom of France) Duke of Boufflers; (Kingdom of France) Count of Estrées	Count of Nava

Strength
One corps around 12,000 – 15,000 troops	Twelve battalions around 6,000 – 7,000 troops

The siege of Mons took place from 7 June to 23 July 1746 during the War of the Austrian Succession. The town of Mons, then part of the Austrian Netherlands, was besieged by a French army corps commanded by Louis François, Prince of Conti. The Austrian and Dutch defenders surrendered the town of Mons on 10 July, while the citadel fell to the French on 23 July.

== Background ==
Following the capture of Brussels by Marshal Maurice de Saxe in February 1746, a council of war was held in the city to determine the next French course of action. Against the advice of Saxe, King Louis XV endorsed the plan of the Prince of Conti to continue operations by taking the towns of Mons and Charleroi. Saxe had advocated for open battle with the Austrians, rather than siege warfare.

== Siege ==
Mons was defended by twelve battalions, at least half of which were Dutch. Conti, who arrived outside the town on 7 June, directed Joseph Marie de Boufflers and the Count of Estrées to lead the French siege force. The trench in front of Mons was opened during the night of 24 to 25 June. On the 10 July, a double attack, one at the Porte de Berthamont and one at the Porte de Nimy, forced the surrender of the town to Conti. The citadel (the fort-annex of Saint-Ghislain) was not included in the capitulation of the town. The siege continued until the citadel succumbed to French attacks on 23 July.
