= Blarenberghe =

Dynasty of painters from Flanders

Van Blarenberghe was the name of a dynasty of painters, originally from French Flanders (Lille), but some of the most famous descendants also lived in Paris, France. They were all descendants from Joris van Blarenberghe (1612–1670).

The first two painters were Hendrick van Blarenberghe (1646–1712) and his son Jacques-Guillaume van Blarenberghe (1679–1742). Their style was still heavily influenced by the Flemish Baroque style. Jacques-Guillaume had two painting sons, Louis-Nicolas van Blarenberghe (15 July 1716 – 1 May 1794) and Henri Désiré van Blarenberghe (1734–1812).

Louis-Nicolas had a son who was also a painter and with whom he often collaborated: Henri-Joseph van Blarenberghe (24 November 1750 – 1 December 1826). Together with his father they stayed at the Palace of Versailles, where they worked as miniaturists for the high society of their day. They were especially famous for their paintings on snuff boxes. Louis-Nicolas also worked as official campaign painter of the French court, following the French army as a war reporter. Two of his daughters, Catherine-Henriette and Isabelle, were chamber maids to the children of the French kings.

Louis-Nicolas created miniature gouaches for two snuffboxes commissioned by the duke of Choiseul:

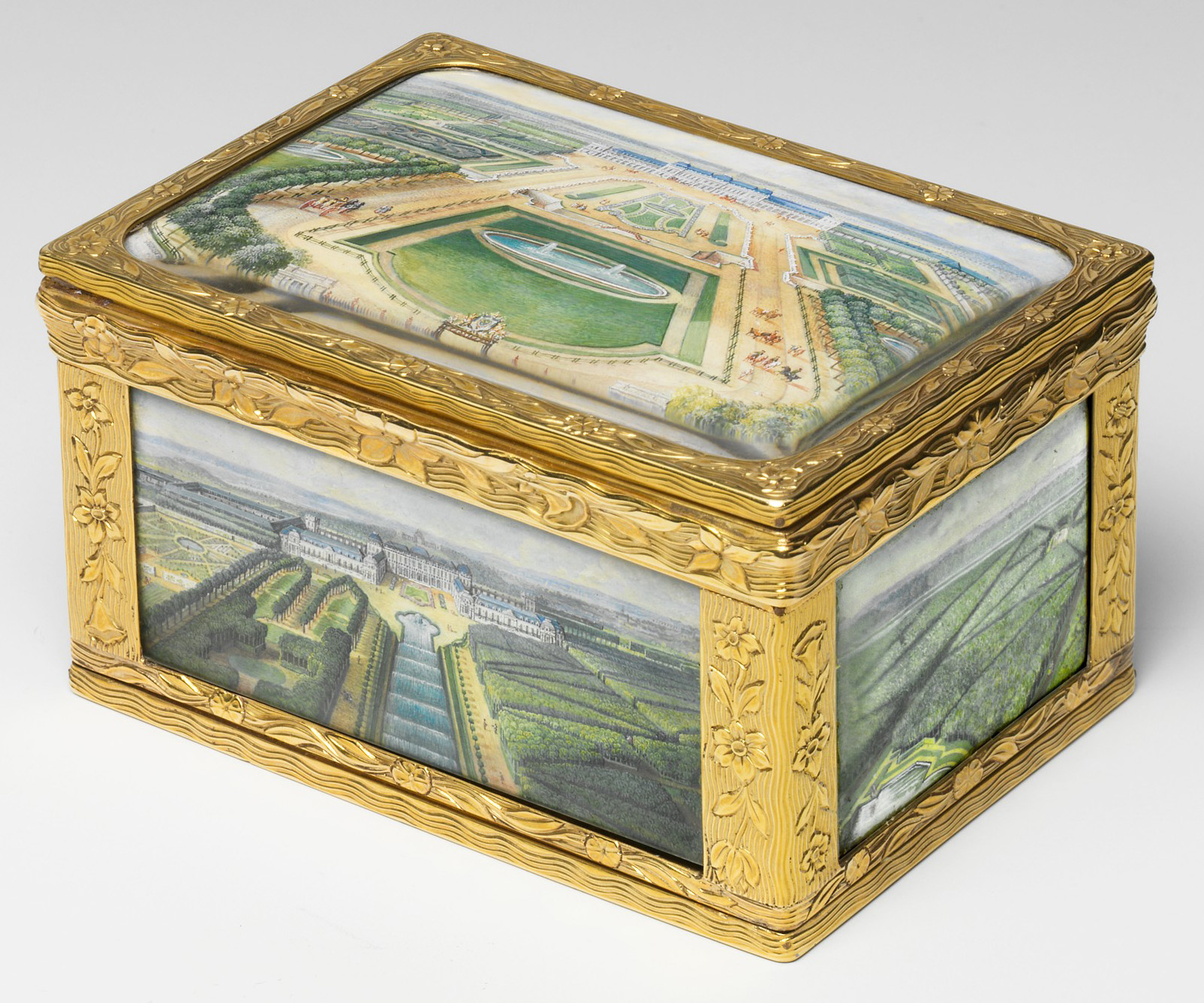
6 exterior views of the duke's Château de Chanteloup

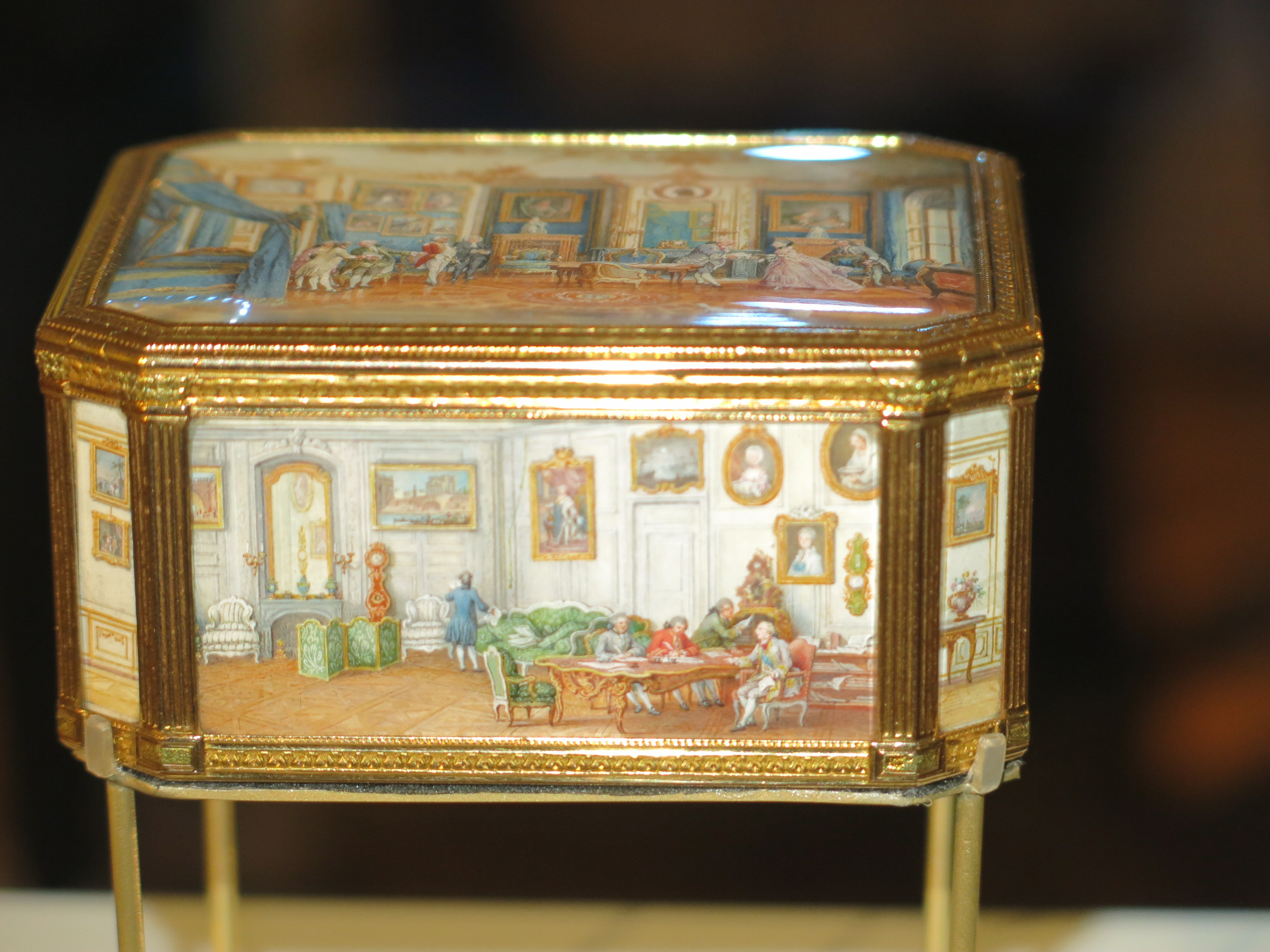
5 interior views of the duke's apartments, and one of the Louvre

The works of Louis-Nicolas and Henri-Joseph were collected in profusion in the 19th century by the Rothschild family. There is a collection of their work on public display at Waddesdon Manor. An enormous collection of Blarenberghe art was sold in the Mentmore Towers sale of 1977.

Henri-Joseph painted, besides the miniatures, mainly panoramic paintings, often in gouache. The subjects were, as with his father, often military, and also included the French revolution. He was the drawing teacher of the French princes, and founder and first conservator of the Palais des Beaux-Arts de Lille.

== Gallery ==
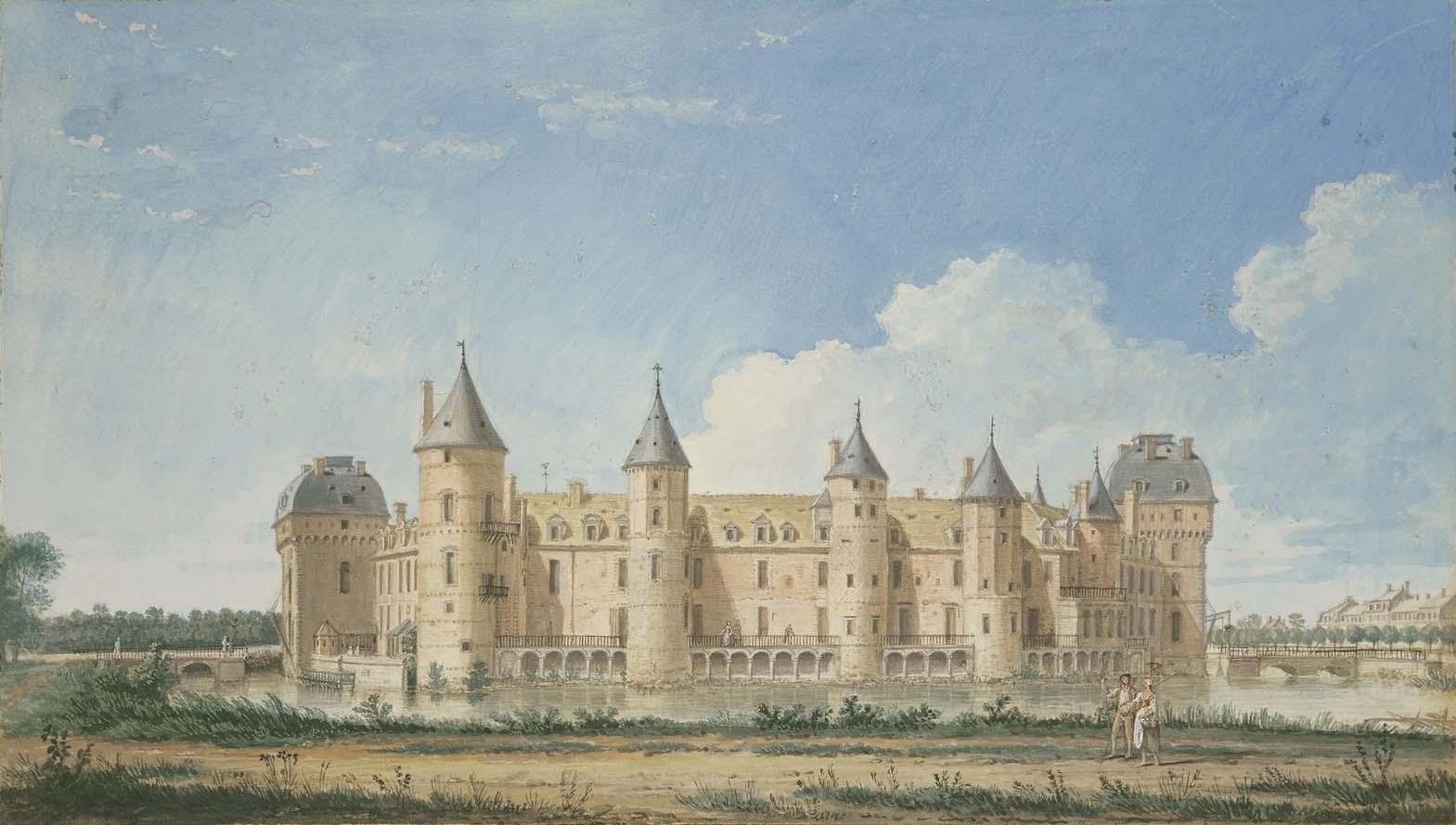
View of La Ferté-Vidame castle, before 1750. Gouache on paper.

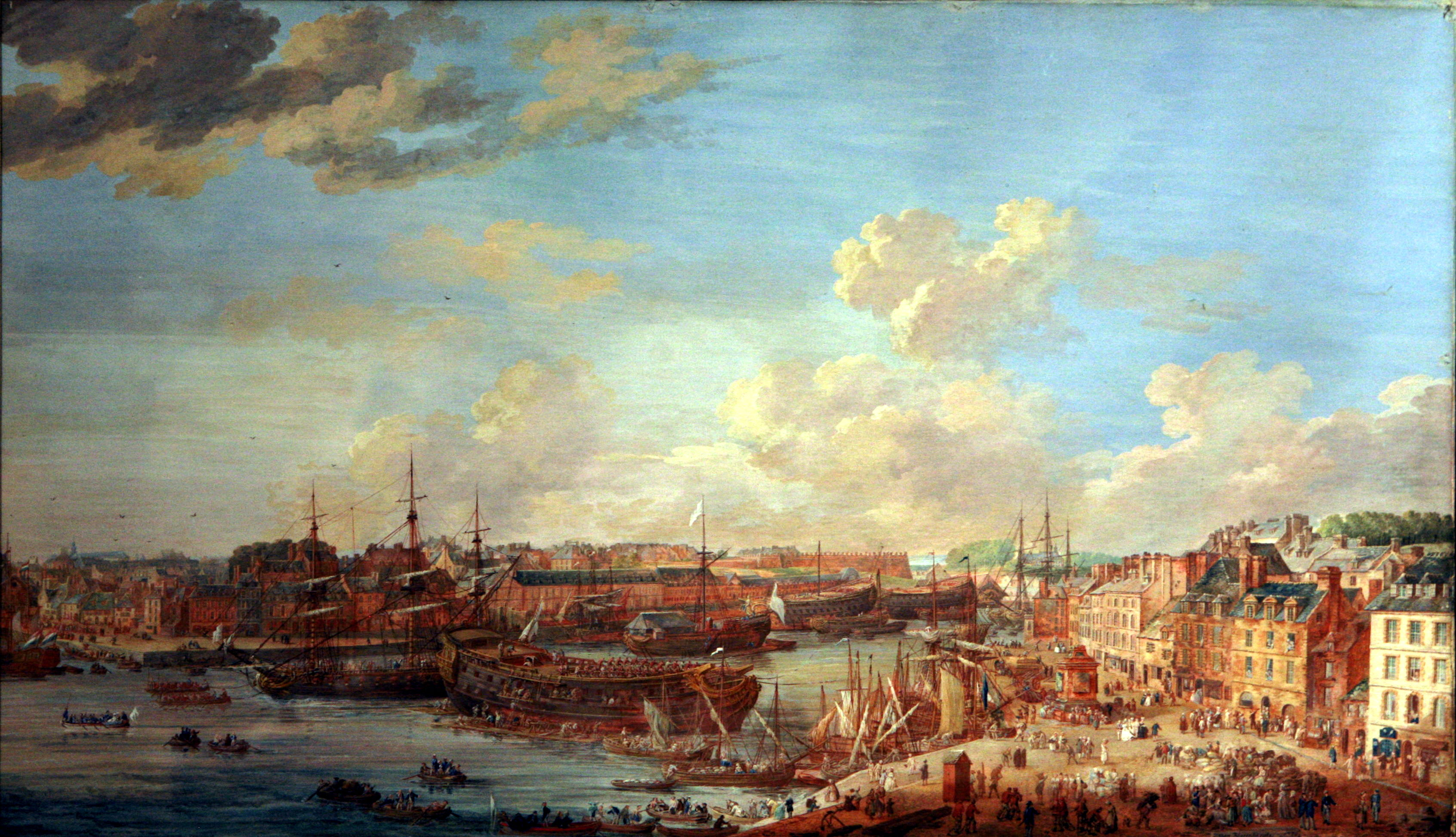
Brest harbour, with a ship having her rigging installed. The painting, titled The Outer Harbor of Brest, is in the collection of the Metropolitan Museum of Art.

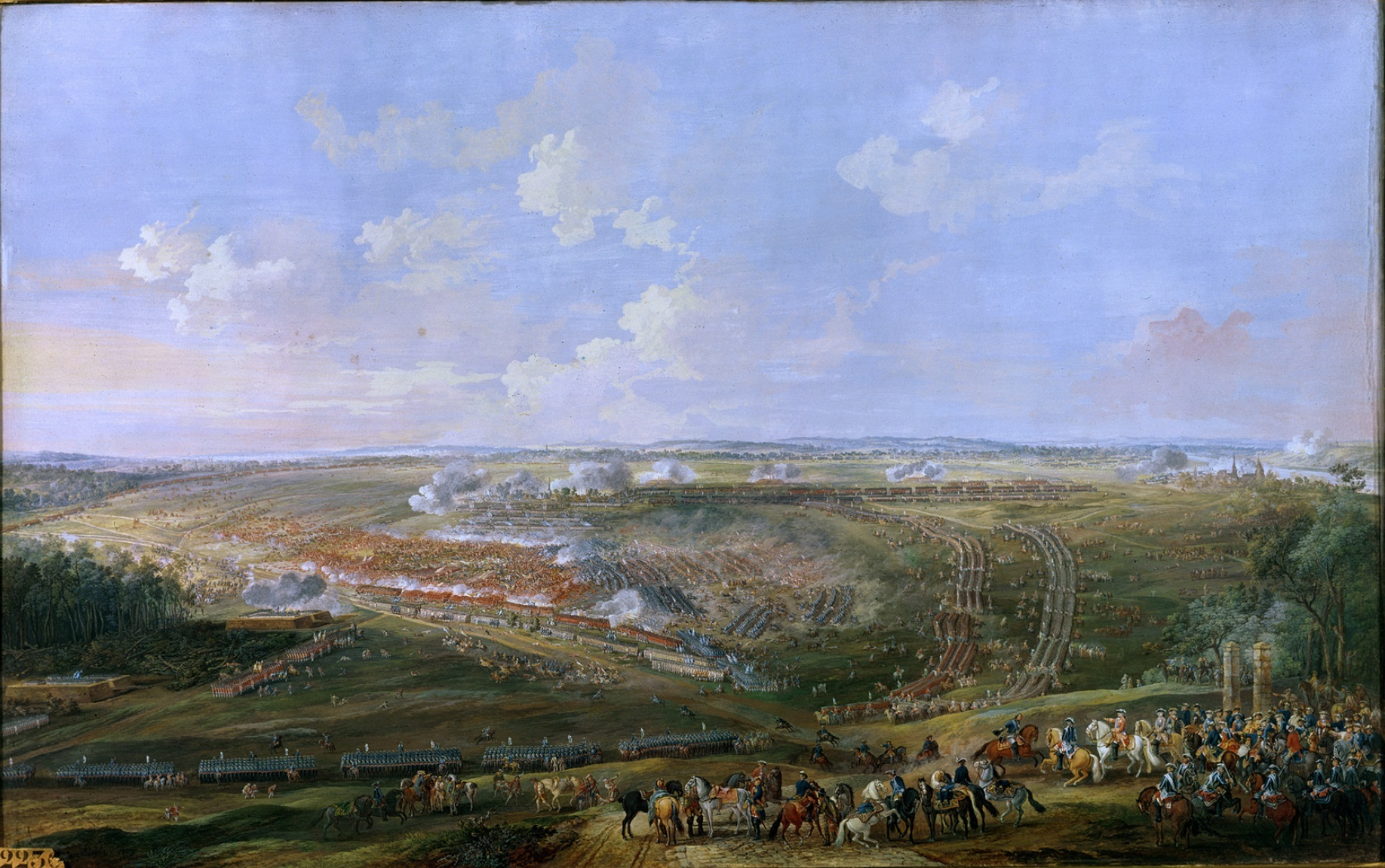
Battle of Fontenoy by Louis-Nicolas van Blarenberghe
