= Colonel General (France) =

Honorary French military office (16th–19th centuries)

A Colonel General was an officer of the French army during the Ancien Régime, the French Revolution, the Napoleonic era and the Bourbon Restoration.

== History ==
The positions were not military ranks, but rather offices of the crown. The position was first created under François I. The Colonels General served directly below the Marshals of France, and they were divided by their branch of service. By the end of the Ancien Régime, the Colonels General were:

- Colonel General of the Infantry (Colonel général de l'infanterie)
- Colonel General of the Cavalry (Colonel général de la cavalerie)
- Colonel General of the Dragoons (Colonel général des dragons)
- Colonel General of the Hussars (Colonel général des hussards)
- Colonel General of the Cent-Suisses and Grisons (Colonel général des Suisses et Grisons)
- Colonel General of the Gardes Françaises (Colonel général des Gardes françaises)

Judging the position of Colonel General of the Infantry to be too powerful, Louis XIV suppressed the position in 1661 and only appointed Colonels General of honorific branches like the Colonel General of the Dragoons (created in 1668), the Colonel General of the Cent-Suisses and Grisons, who oversaw the Swiss regiments of the Maison du Roi, and the Colonel of the Gardes Françaises. The position was reinstated under Louis XV.

Most of these offices were eliminated at the time of the French Revolution, during which there was a Colonel General of the National Guard, but they were reinstated by Napoleon I. Under the Bourbon Restoration, certain titles were accorded to members of the royal family. After 1830, the position was eliminated.

== Colonels General of the Ancien Régime ==
=== Infantry ===
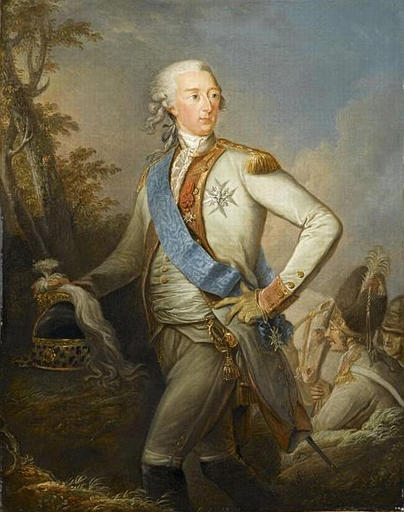
Louis Joseph, Prince of Condé in the uniform of Colonel General of the Infantry

- 1546 : Jean de Taix
- ???? : Charles de Cossé-Brissac
- 1547 : Gaspard de Coligny, Admiral of France
- 1555 : François de Coligny, seigneur d'Andelot
- 1558 : Blaise de Montluc, Marshal of France
- 1560 : Charles de La Rochefoucauld, seigneur de Randan
- 1562 : Sébastien de Luxembourg, duc de Penthièvre
- ???? : Timoléon de Cossé-Brissac
- 1569–1581 : Philippe Strozzi, seigneur d'Épernay and de Bressuire
- 1581–1642 : Jean Louis de Nogaret de La Valette, duc d'Épernon
- 1642–1661 : Bernard de Nogaret de La Valette d'Épernon
- 1721–1730 : Louis d'Orléans, Duke of Orléans
- 1780–1790 : Louis Joseph de Bourbon, Prince of Condé

=== Cavalry ===
- 1548–1549 : Charles de Cossé, Count of Brissac
- 1549 : Claude de Lorraine, duc d'Aumale
- 1558 : Jacques, Duke of Nemours
- 1569–1571 : François de Lorraine, duc de Guise
- 1571–1572 : Charles de Montmorency-Damville, Admiral of France
- 1572–1574 : Guillaume de Montmorency, seigneur de Thuré
- 1574–1585 : Jacques, Duke of Nemours
- 1585–1586 : Charles, Duke of Aumale
- 1586–1588 : Jean-François, maréchal de La Guiche
- 1588–1589 : Charles de Valois, comte d'Auvergne
- 1589–1595 : duc des Ursins
- 1595–1604 : Charles de Valois, comte d'Auvergne
- 1604–1616 : Jacques, Duke of Nemours
- 1616–1618 : Charles de Valois, duc d'Angoulême
- 1618–1618 : François de Valois, comte d'Alès
- 1618–1626 : Henri, Duke of Rohan
- 1626–1643 : Louis de Valois, comte d'Alès
- 1643–1653 : Louis Emmanuel de Valois, duc d'Angoulême
- 1653–1657 : Louis de Lorraine, duc de Joyeuse
- 1657–1675 : Henri de la Tour d'Auvergne-Bouillon, vicomte de Turenne
- 1675–1705 : Frédéric Maurice de La Tour d'Auvergne
- 1705–1740 : Henri Louis de La Tour d'Auvergne
- 1740–1759 : Godefroy Charles Henri de La Tour d'Auvergne
- 1759–1790 : Armand Louis de Béthune

=== Dragoons ===
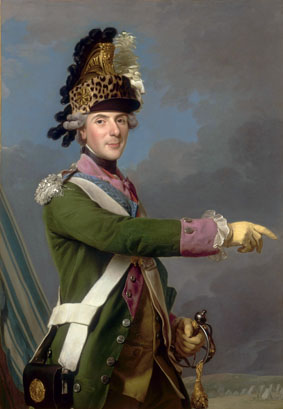
Louis, Dauphin of France in the uniform of Colonel General of the Dragoons (1765)

- 1668–1672 : Antonin Nompar de Caumont, duc de Lauzun
- 1672–1678 : Nicolas d'Argouges, marquis de Rannes
- 1678–1692 : Louis François de Boufflers, Marshal of France
- 1692–1703 : René de Froulay, comte de Tessé, Marshal of France, général des Galères
- 1703–1704 : Antoine V de Gramont, Marshal of France, colonel général des Gardes Françaises
- 1704–1734 : François de Franquetot de Coigny, Marshal of France
- 1734–1748 : Jean Antoine François de Franquetot, duc de Coigny, killed in a duel
- 1748–1754 : François de Franquetot de Coigny, Marshal of France
- 1754–1771 : Marie Charles Louis d'Albert, duc de Chevreuse and de Luynes
- 1771–1783 : François-Henri de Franquetot de Coigny
- 1783–1790 : Louis Joseph Charles Amable d'Albert, duc de Chevreuse and de Luynes

=== Hussars ===
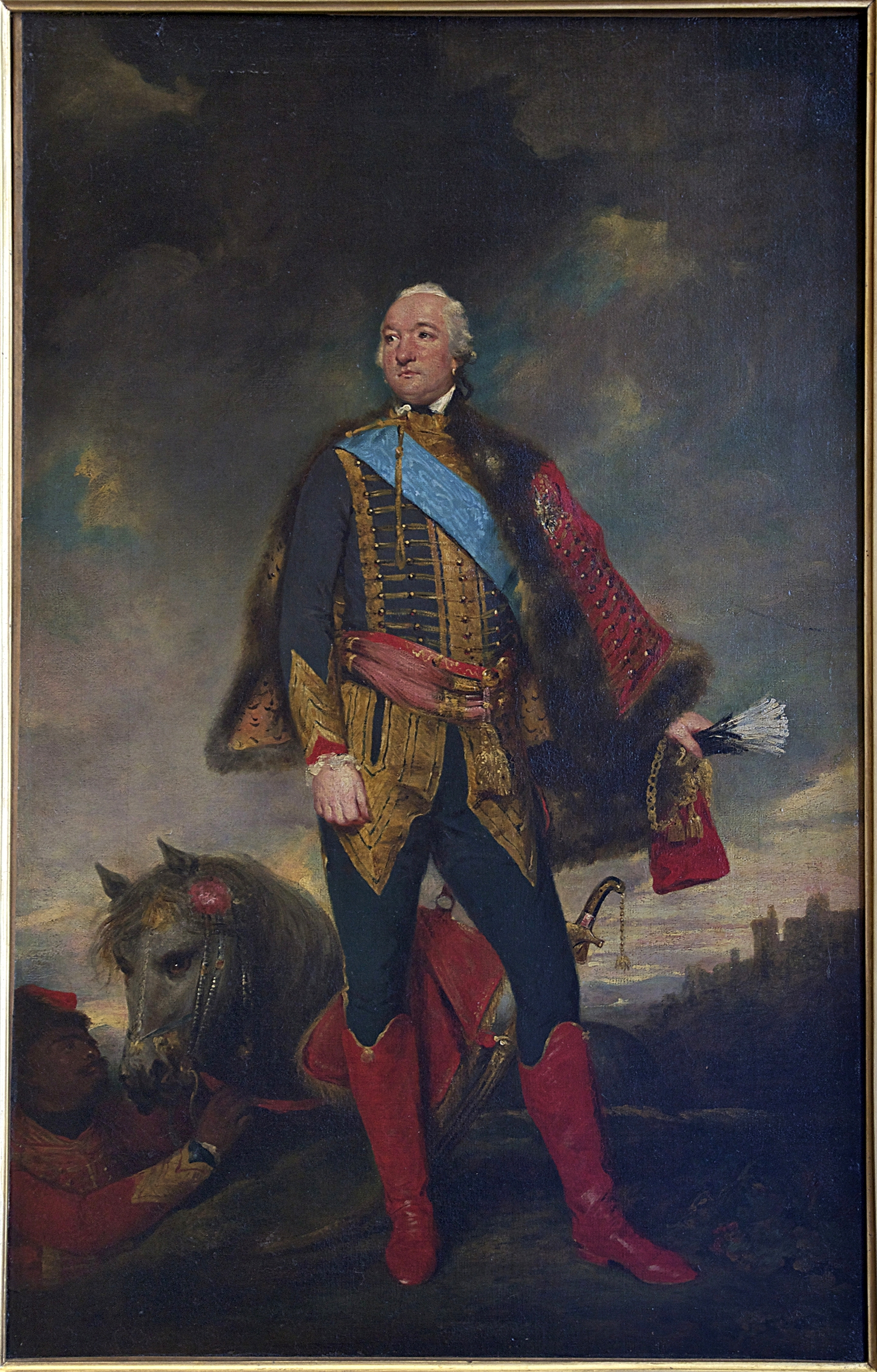
Louis Philippe II, Duke of Orléans in the uniform of Colonel General of the Hussars (c. 1779)

- 1778–1790 : Louis Philippe II, Duke of Orléans

=== Cent-Suisses et Grisons ===
- 1568–1596 : Charles de Montmorency-Damville, Admiral of France
- 1596–1605 : Nicolas de Harlay, seigneur de Sancy
- 1605–1614 : Henri, duc de Rohan
- 1614–1632 : François de Bassompierre, Marshal of France
- 1632–1642 : César, marquis de Coislin
- 1642–1643 : marquis de La Châtre
- 1643–1647 : François de Bassompierre, Marshal of France
- 1647–1657 : Charles de Schomberg, Marshal of France
- 1657–1674 : Eugene Maurice, Count of Soissons
- 1674–1710 : Louis Auguste, Duke of Maine
- 1710–1755 : Louis Auguste, Prince of Dombes
- 1755–1762 : Louis Charles, Count of Eu
- 1762–1771 : Étienne François de Choiseul-Stainville, duc de Choiseul
- 1771–1790 : Charles Philippe, Count of Artois, brother of Louis XVI

=== Gardes-Françaises ===
- 1661–1671 : Antoine, duc de Gramont
- 1672–1692 : François d'Aubusson de La Feuillade
- 1692–1704 : Louis François, duc de Boufflers
- 1704–1717 : Antoine de Gramont, duc de Guiche
- 1717–1741 : Louis Antoine Armand, duc de Gramont
- 1741–1745 : Louis, duc de Gramont
- 1745–1788 : Louis Antoine de Gontaut, duc de Biron

== Colonels General of the Revolution ==
- National Guard: Gilbert du Motier, Marquis de Lafayette

== Colonels General of the Napoleonic era ==
- Carabiniers à Cheval: Louis Bonaparte, king of Holland and Constable of the Empire
- Chasseurs à cheval: Auguste Frédéric Louis Viesse de Marmont, then Emmanuel de Grouchy
- Chasseurs à Pied of the Imperial Guard: Jean-de-Dieu Soult, Duc de Dalmatie
- Cuirassiers: Laurent, comte Gouvion-Saint-Cyr, then Augustin, comte Belliard
- Dragoons: Louis, comte Baraguey d'Hilliers, then Étienne-Marie-Antoine Champion, comte de Nansouty (1813-1814)
- Imperial Guard: Edouard Adolphe Casimir Joseph Mortier, then Louis Gabriel Suchet
- Grenadiers à pied of the Imperial Guard: Louis Nicolas Davout
- Hussars: Jean Andoche Junot
- Suisses: Jean Lannes, duc de Montebello, then Louis-Alexandre Berthier, Vice-Constable of the Empire,

== Colonels General of the Restoration ==
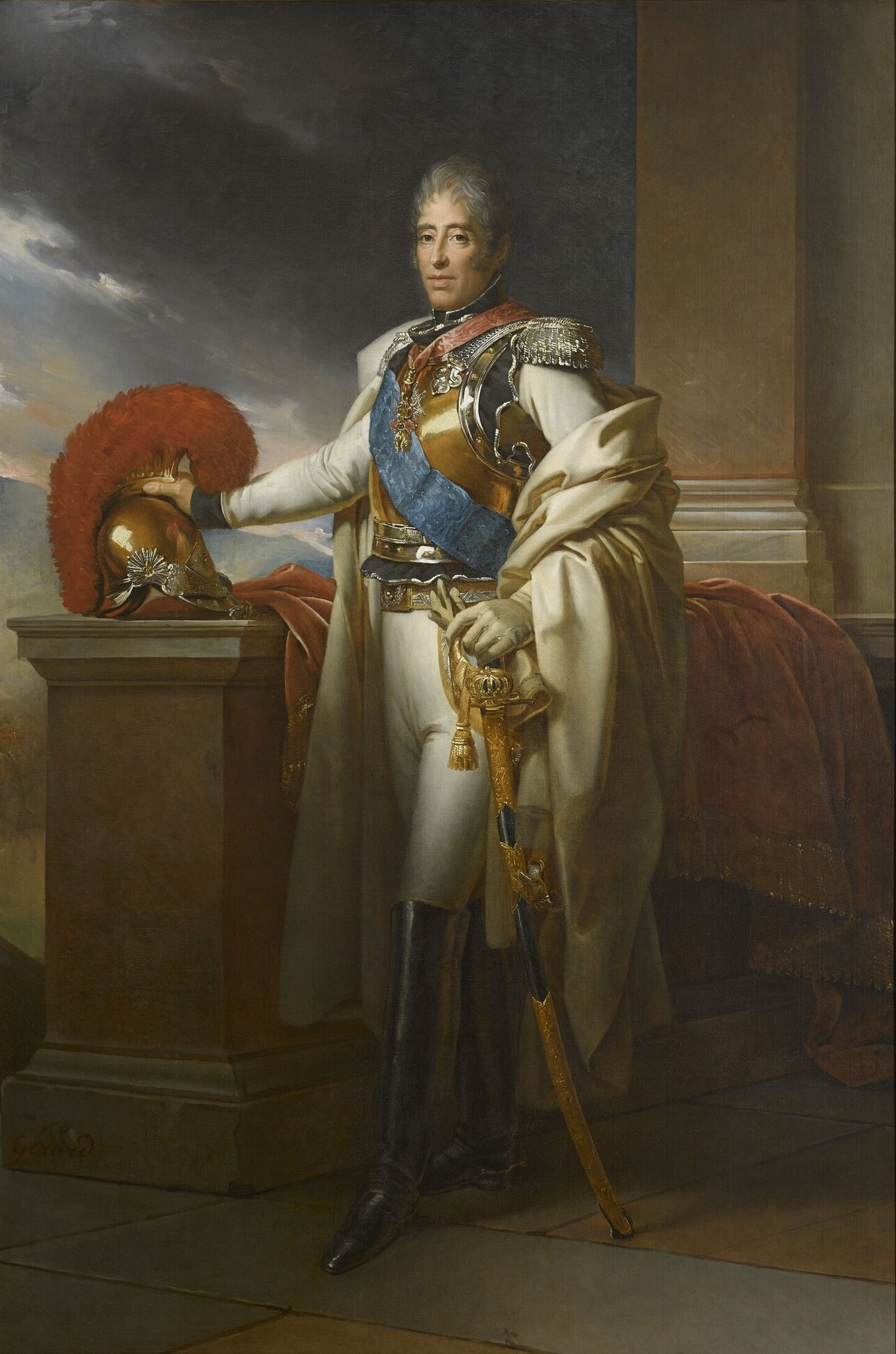
Charles Phillipe, Count of Artois in the uniform of Colonel General of the Carabiniers (c. 1815)

- Royal Carabiniers: Louis Antoine, Duke of Angoulême, eldest son of Charles X
- Chevaux-légers-lanciers: Charles Ferdinand, Duke of Berry, younger son of Charles X
- Cuirassiers: Louis Antoine, Duke of Angoulême
- Garde Nationale: Charles Philippe, Count of Artois, brother of Louis XVIII
- Suisses: Henri, grandson of Charles X
- Hussars: Louis Philippe, Duke of Orléans

== See also ==
- Great Officers of the Crown of France

== Sources ==
- Laun, Henri Van (1879). The French Revolutionary Epoch: Being a History of France from the Beginning of the First French Revolution to the End of the Second Empire. D. Appleton.
