= Duke of Lauzun =

French peerage created in 1692

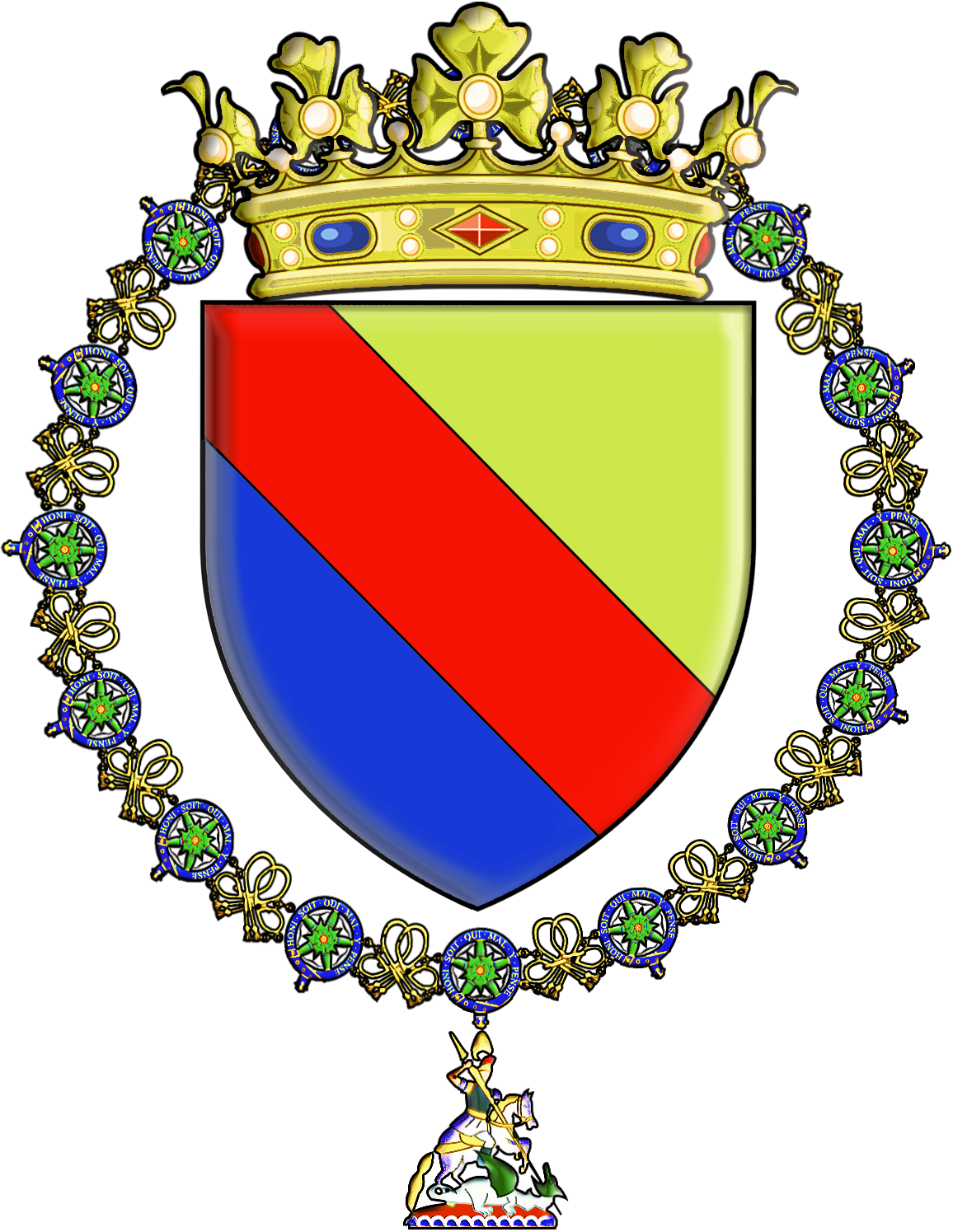
- Coat od arms of Antonin-Nompar de Caumont, Duke of Lauzun
- Creation date: 1692
- First holder: Antoine Nompar de Caumont
- Last holder: Armand Louis de Gontaut
- Extinction date: 1793

The Duke of Lauzun was a French noble title, in particular, a French peerage created in 1692 for Antoine Nompar de Caumont under influence of Mary of Modena. All Dukes of Lauzun were Marshals of France or renowned generals.

== Dukes of Lauzun ==
1. Antoine Nompar de Caumont (1632–1723)
2. Charles Armand de Gontaut (1663–1756), husband of Marie Antoinette De Bautru de Nogent, daughter of Antoine's only sister Diane Charlotte
3. Louis Antoine de Gontaut (1700–1788), son
4. Armand Louis de Gontaut (1747–1793), nephew
