= Armand Louis de Gontaut =

French soldier and politician

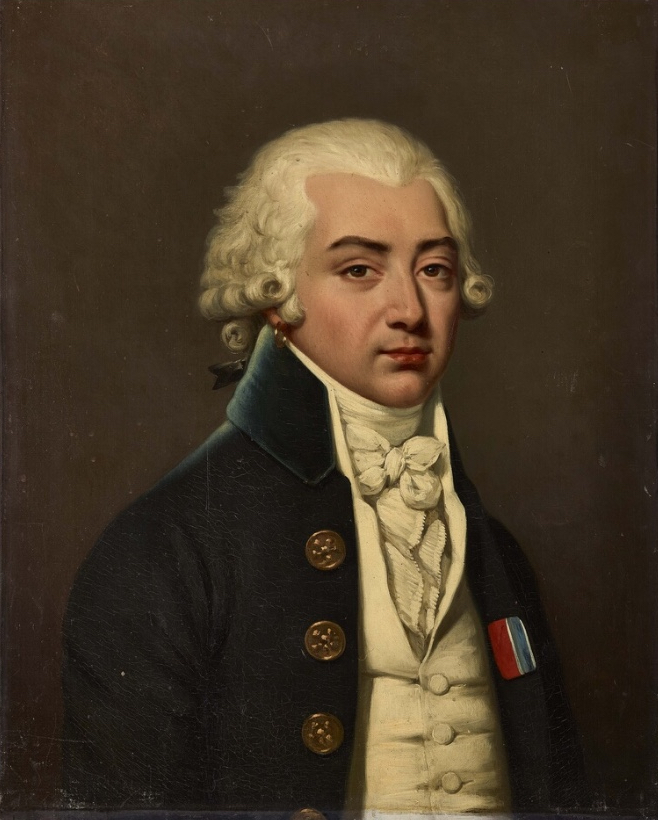
- Armand Louis de Gontaut, duc de Lauzun, and duc de Biron
- Born: 13 April 1747; Paris, Kingdom of France
- Died: 31 December 1793 (aged 46) Paris, French First Republic
- Allegiance: Kingdom of France; Kingdom of France; French First Republic
- Branch: Army
- Awards: Order of Cincinnati; Order of St. Louis

Armand Louis de Gontaut (French pronunciation: [aʁmɑ̃ lwi də ɡɔ̃to]), duc de Lauzun, later duc de Biron, and usually referred to by historians of the French Revolution simply as Biron (13 April 1747 – 31 December 1793), was a French soldier and politician, known for the part he played in the American War of Independence and the French Revolutionary Wars. In 1773, he was Grand second warden of Grand Orient de France.

== Biography ==
=== Early life ===
Born in Paris to Charles Antoine de Gontaut de Biron (8 October 1708 – 25 Octobre 1798) and his wife Antoinette-Eustachie née Crozat du Châtel (25 October 1727 – 16 April 1747), daughter of Louis François Crozat (1691–1750), granddaughter of banker Antoine Crozat, the first proprietary owner of French Louisiana, from 1712 to 1717. Armand Louis bore the title of Duc de Lauzun, which had passed, on the death of Antoine Nompar de Caumont, duc de Lauzun (1633–1723), to his niece, the wife of Charles Armand de Gontaut, duc de Biron (1663–1756). It was strongly rumored at the time that duc de Biron's actual father was Étienne François, duc de Choiseul, his mother's lover and close friend of his father.

In 1788, he succeeded to the duchy of Biron on the death of his uncle, Louis Antoine de Gontaut, duc de Biron (1700–1788). On 4 February 1766 he married Amélie de Boufflers (5 May 1751 – guillotined on 27 June 1794), only daughter of Charles-Joseph de Boufflers (1731–1751) and Mary Anne Philippine de Montmorency Logny (1732–1797). He lived apart from his wife, had no children (legitimate, at least), even though his wife was a young woman described as a paragon of gentle, virginal shyness; a combination of shrewdness and simplicity. Similarly the Duke was a popular companion and house guest.

He served in the guards as early as 1761, and in 1767 made the expedition of Corsica as aide-de-camp of de Chanvelin. On 29 June 1769, he was made chevalier of the order of Saint Louis. Traveling throughout Europe, engaging in idle frivolity, and – according to his Memoirs – various love affairs, he wasted his fortune, which in 1777 forced him to transfer his estates to Henri Louis, Prince of Guéméné (grand chamberlain and captain lieutenant of the gendarmes of the king's ordinary guard), upon the payment of an annuity of 80,000 livres. The prince, however, became bankrupt and the annuity was reduced more than half. Around that time he attracted attention by an essay on the military defenses of Great Britain and its colonies (État de défense d’Angleterre et de toutes ses possessions dans les quatres parties du monde), leading to his appointment to a command against the British in 1779, in which he had some success. That in turn lead to his being sent with some ships under the command of Louis-Philippe de Rigaud, Marquis de Vaudreuil on an expedition to Senegal and other coast possessions of the British, de Veudreuil capturing Senegal in January 1779, shortly before sailing to North America in aid of Rochambeau in 1780. Though the fortress at Cape Blanc he seized on 30 January 1779 was recaptured directly after his departure during the same year, de Vaudreuil was awarded the Grand Cross of St. Louis in 1789, whereas Lauzun received the title of colonel of hussars, and became proprietory [sic?] colonel of a foreign regiment named after him. Appointed brigadier on the first of March, 1780, Lauzun decided to take part in the War of American Independence.

=== American Revolution service ===
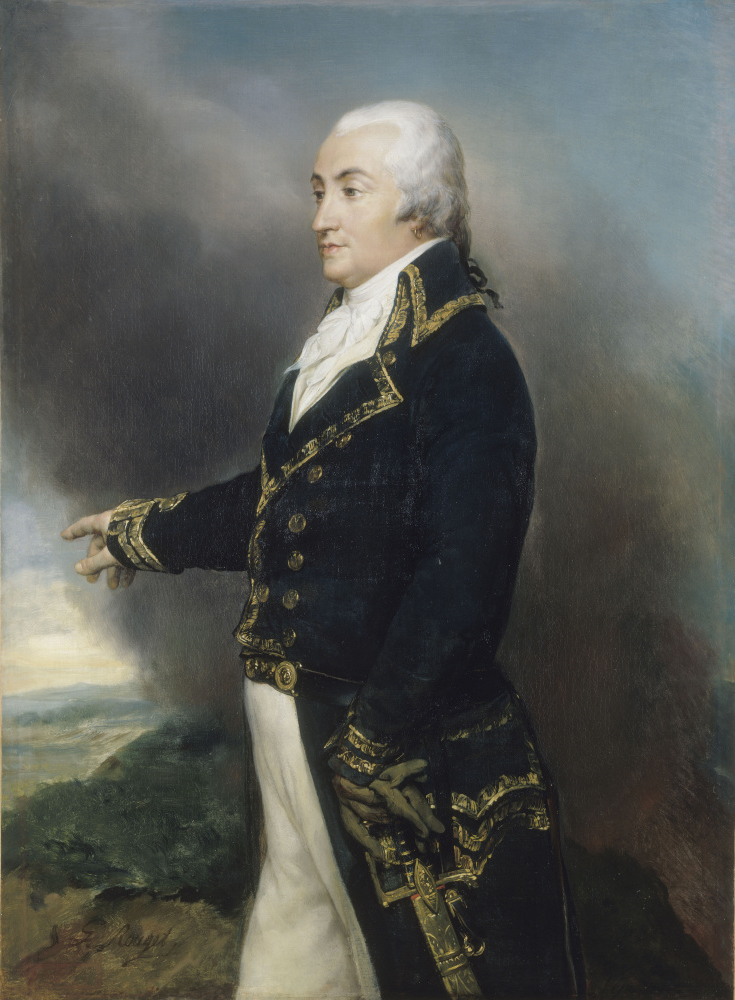
Armand Louis de Gontaut

Following his appointment to a command against the British in 1779, commanding the troops that captured Fort St Louis, in Senegal, from the British, Lauzun raised an army of volunteer hussars and infantry, subsequently known as Lauzun's Legion, for service in North America. He arrived with 600 of his men in Rhode Island; the remainder were in France, prevented from leaving. Despite having only a portion of his force, he engaged in several active skirmishes, including one near Gloucester, Virginia on 4 October 1781.

In 1781, he took an important part in the American War of Independence by being the advance party of the main French army of Rochambeau sent to reinforce General George Washington at the Siege of Yorktown in 1781. Lauzun's Legion left their winter quarters in Lebanon, Connecticut on 9 June 1781 and marched south through Connecticut known as the Washington-Rochambeau Revolutionary Route. Their main function was to be an advance party but also to remain ten to fifteen miles south of the main army to protect the flank against any British troops located in the many Loyalist towns in lower Fairfield County. While in Connecticut, the French made camps in Middletown, Wallingford, North Haven, Ripton and North Stratford. They arrived at North Stratford, now Nichols on 28 June and stayed for two days. From the hilltop in North Stratford, now Abraham Nichols Park, one could easily see for seventy miles past Long Island Sound to New York and beyond. The French used this time to conduct reconnaissance on British ships in New York harbor.

De Lauzun received the order to sail for France on 11 March 1783. On 24 October 1781, after the Siege of Yorktown, Surveillante, under Villeneuve Cillart, brought Lauzun to France to bring the news of the victory. She arrived at Brest on 15 November. Lauzun had a hero's welcome and was made maréchal de camp.

On the death of his uncle, Louis Antoine de Gontaut, in 1788, he took the title of the duke de Biron. In 1789 he was returned as deputy to the States General by the noblesse of Quercy and attached himself to the revolutionary cause. He entered the party of the duke Philippe d'Orléans and later was accused of being the confidant and his secret agent. He several times mounted the tribune to exculpate him and in the proceedings of the Chatelet, relative to the crimes of 5 and 6 October 1789, he was accused of having appeared with him in the midst of the assassins.

=== French Revolution service ===
In 1789, he was returned as deputy to the Estates-General by the noblesse of the seneschalty of Quercy, and affiliated with the Revolutionary cause. In 1791, he was sent by the National Constituent Assembly to receive the oath of the army of Flanders, and was subsequently appointed to its command. In July 1792 he was named commander of the Army of the Rhine, with the duty of watching the movements of the Habsburg monarchy troops.

In May 1793, he was transferred to the command of the French Revolutionary Army on the La Rochelle front, the Army of the Coasts of La Rochelle, operating against the Vendéan insurgency against the Reign of Terror. He gained several successes, among them the capture of Saumur and the victory of Parthenay (Bataille de Parthenay), but the insubordination of his troops and the suspicions of his political supervisors made his position intolerable and he sent in his resignation, ending his command on 16 July 1793.

=== Execution ===
He was accused by the notorious Jean-Baptiste Carrier of incivisme ("lack of civic virtue", the equivalent of treason under the Reign of Terror) and undue leniency to the insurgents, deprived of his command (July). The public prosecutor Antoine Quentin Fouquier-Tinville accused him of "having conspired against the unity and indivisibility of the Republic and the tranquility of the interior and exterior security of the French Empire and betraying the interests of the Republic ("conspiré contre l'unité et l'indivisibilité de la République et la tranquillité de la sûreté intérieure et extérieure de l'Empire français et trahir les intérêts de la République en abusant de sa qualité"). Imprisoned in the Abbaye, sentenced to death by the Revolutionary Tribunal and guillotined. His wife, Amélie de Boufflers, was herself executed on 27 June 1794.

== Works ==
His Memoires, which come down to 1783, were published under his name in 1822 (and reprinted in a new edition of 1858), and letters were published in 1865, said to have been written by him in 1789 to friends in the country, describing the Estates-General. An English translation of his memoirs was published in 1928.

== Legacy ==
- An American warship was named after Armand Louis de Gontaut: USS Duc de Lauzun.
- P Street Bridge, a bridge over Rock Creek Park in Washington, D.C., was renamed Lauzun's Legion Bridge in 2006.
- The Duc de Lauzun, was portrayed in the book, Mistress of the Revolution by Catherine Delors. He also is portrayed as the main character in the play Fortuna by Marina Tsvetaeva.
