= Lauzun's Legion Bridge =

Bridge in Washington, DC

Lauzun's Legion Bridge P Street Bridge
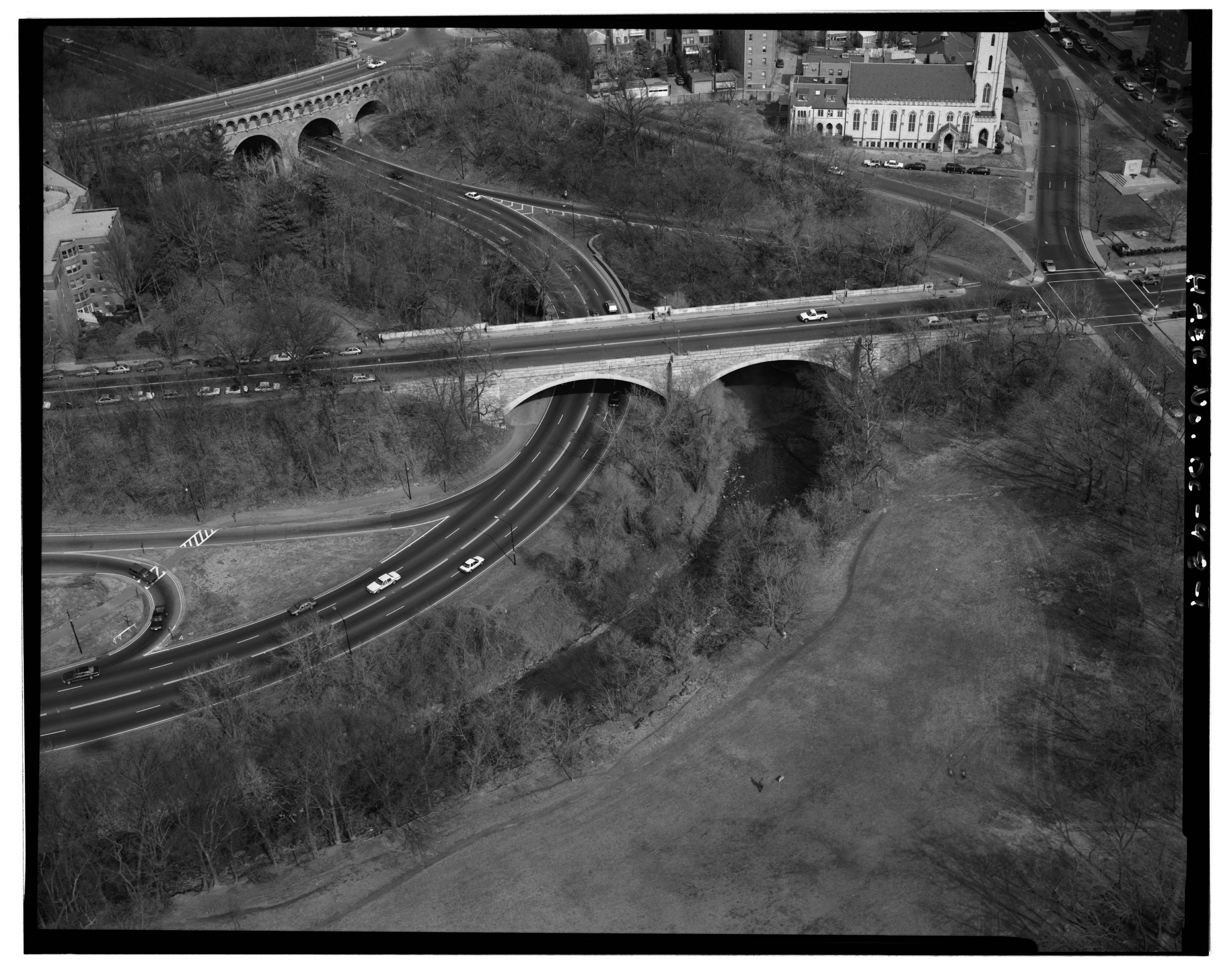
- P Street Bridge, with Dumbarton Bridge in the background
- Coordinates: 38°54′35″N 77°03′01″W
- Carries: P Street NW, pedestrians
- Crosses: Rock Creek and Rock Creek and Potomac Parkway
- Locale: Georgetown and Dupont Circle, Washington, D.C.
- Official name: Lauzun's Legion Bridge

Characteristics
- Design: Double elliptical arch bridge
- Material: Concrete faced with multi-colored ashlar and smooth granite
- Total length: 336 feet (102.4 m)

History
- Designer: Albert Harris
- Constructed by: Pecora-Gaskill Engineering and Construction Corporation
- Opened: July 1935
- Rebuilt: 2003–2004

Location
- Interactive map of Lauzun's Legion Bridge

The P Street Bridge or Lauzun's Legion Bridge is a 336-foot (102 m) concrete arch bridge that conveys P Street across Rock Creek and Rock Creek Park between the Georgetown and Dupont Circle neighborhoods of Northwest Washington, D.C. Built in 1935, it replaced an older iron truss bridge.

== History ==
The location of the bridge was long used as a ford over Rock Creek, connecting the town of Georgetown to points east. During the American Revolution, the Baltimore Light Dragoons and French units led by the Marquis de Lafayette, Count Rochambeau and Armand Louis de Gontaut, Duc de Lauzun crossed here.

The first bridge at the site was a wooden covered bridge built in 1855. It was replaced in 1871 by an iron truss bridge, which was rebuilt in 1893 to carry streetcars operated by the Metropolitan Railroad.

=== Current bridge ===
The current bridge was built in 1935.

The bridge was closed for a $3.5 million reconstruction in 2003, the first since its completion, and reopened on July 15, 2004.

=== Renaming ===
In June 2006, the Dupont Circle Advisory Neighborhood Commission (2B) discussed a proposal to give the bridge a ceremonial designation to commemorate the 225th anniversary of the end of the American Revolutionary War. On October 14, 2006, the P Street Bridge was ceremonially renamed Lauzun's Legion Bridge for Lauzun's Legion (French: Volontaires-etrangers de Lauzun), a specially constructed unit that was formed on March 5, 1780, from various detachments of the French Army and Navy commanded by Duc de Lauzun at the Siege of Yorktown. The ceremony was attended by French Ambassador Jean-David Levitte, Jacques Bossiere, and representatives of the D.C. Daughters of the American Revolution and D.C. Children of the American Revolution.

== See also ==
- List of bridges documented by the Historic American Engineering Record in Washington, D.C.
