= Arnaud de Gramont =

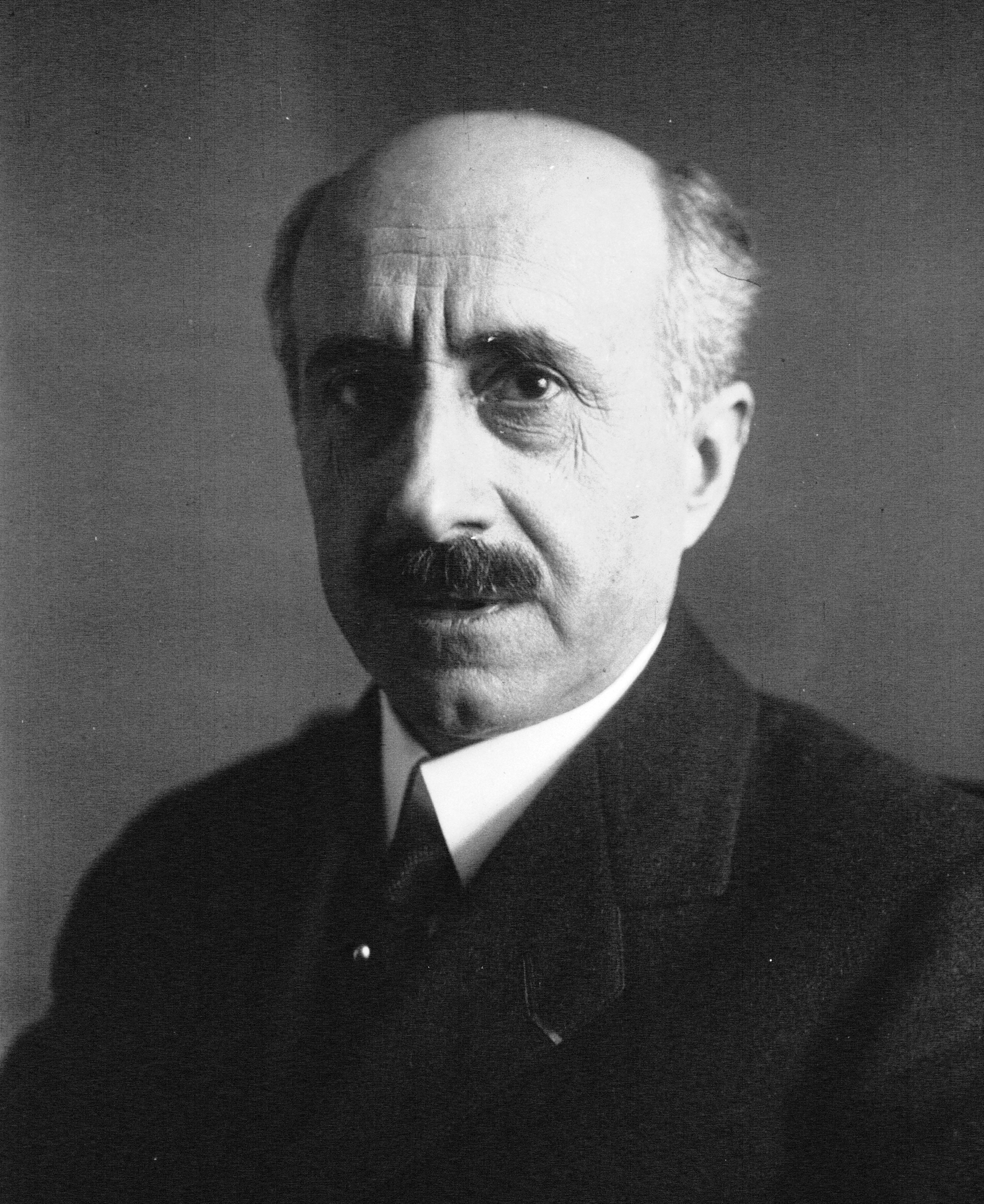
Portrait c. 1913

Count Antoine Alfred Arnaud Xavier Louis de Gramont (21 April 1861 – 31 October 1923) was a French aristocrat with an interest in minerals, geology, and was a pioneer of spectroscopy. He conducted studies on pyroelectricity and dissociation spectroscopy in which he used an electric spark going through a mineral sample as a source to examine spectra.

== Life and work ==
Gramont came from an aristocratic Paris family. He was the grandson of Françoise, duchesse de Praslin. Françoise was found murdered. Her husband, Charles de Choiseul, Duke of Praslin was believed guilty for her death and committed suicide while awaiting trial. These events in 1847 contributed to the French Revolution of 1848. Gramont took an interest in minerals, initially examining their synthesis (including the synthesis of boracite and datolite) and then examining pyroelectricity in scolecite along with Georges Friedel.

From 1894 he began to experiment in spectroscopy and developed a direct approach to analysis of minerals using an induction coil to generate sparks within which a sample was placed. He was able to remove the spectral lines caused by the metal of the electrodes by removing the condenser. Using photography, he also extended spectroscopy into the UV region. He developed the technique further using capillary tubes of samples fused with salts.

He also examined approaches to quantitative estimation of chemicals using the brightness of the spectra. Most of his findings were published in French in the Comptes rendus hebdomadaires des séances de l’Académie des sciences. His last work was on spectroscopy which he was working on along with Paul-Émile Lecoq de Boisbaudran. He died suddenly after a short illness.

== Personal life ==
He married Anne-Marie Brincart, the daughter of baron Brincart and the granddaughter of Ernest Duboys d'Angers.

On 2 December 1911 in Pau, his daughter Diane de Gramont married Mino Álvares Pereira de Mello, 9th Duke of Cadaval, the Head of the 3rd branch of the House of Bragance, a grandson of countess Zilerie dal Verme, née Lucchesi Palli, the daughter of Marie-Caroline of Bourbon-Two Sicilies, Duchess of Berry.
