= 5th Hussar Regiment (France) =

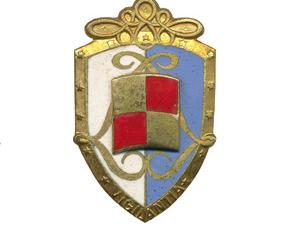
- Regimental Badge
- Active: 1783–1992
- Country: France
- Branch: French Army
- Type: Light cavalry
- Role: Conventional warfare Maneuver warfare Raiding; Reconnaissance; Shock attack
- Size: Regiment
- Garrison/HQ: Laon 1980. Couvron 1984.
- Nicknames: Légion de Lauzun (1780) de Lauzun (1783)
- Motto: Perit sed in armis (they die arms in hand)
- March: Eugènie
- Anniversaries: 24 June 1859 (Solférino); Saint George
- Engagements: American Revolutionary War; French Revolutionary Wars; Napoleonic Wars; Mexico Expedition; First World War
- Decorations: Croix de guerre 1914-1918 with palm Médaille d'or de la Ville de Milan
- Battle honours: Valmy 1792; Iéna 1806; La Moskova 1812; Solferino 1859; Puebla 1863; Lorraine 1914; Champagne 1915; La Marne 1918

Commanders
- Notable commanders: Duc de Lauzun

The 5th Hussar Regiment (5e régiment de hussards or 5e RH) was a French Hussar regiment.

== Formation under the Ancien Régime ==
The 5th Hussar Regiment was formed under the Ancien Régime. It was the last regiment created under the monarchy. It particularly distinguished itself during the American Revolutionary War.

- 1 September 1778: Creation of the Navy's foreign volunteer corps, mainly composed of eight mixed legions to participate in the war against Great Britain. It was created by the naval minister Gabriel de Sartine, and 'propriétaire' status had been granted to Armand Louis de Gontaut, duc de Lauzun. The corps comprised three legions, each consisting of four companies of grenadiers, chasseurs and fusiliers, plus artillery, cavalry and pioneer detachments. As with other 18th century "legions" the intention was to create a miniature army which could campaign as a single entity. As indicated by the title, the corps was recruited primarily from German, Polish and Irish mercenaries. As the Volontaires Etrangers de la Marine, the new corps saw active service in Senegal in December 1778 as well as in the West Indies.
- 5 March 1780: The 2^{e} Légion des Volontaires Étrangers de la Marine changed its name to be the 2^{e} Légion des Volontaires Étrangers de Lauzun, or the Légion de Lauzun. This unit was present in the United States of America from July 1780 to May 1783.
- When in early 1781 the Expédition Particulière was being organized, most of the 1778 organization had been deployed to overseas posts. What remained in France, under the duc de Lauzun, was reconstituted as the Volontaires-étrangers de Lauzun, and was part of Rochambeau's expedition.
- 14 September 1783: The unit became known as the Régiment de Hussards de Lauzun.

== Lauzun's Legion ==
Lauzun's Legion was made up of infantry, cavalry, and artillery components and were recruited largely from foreign mercenaries. They were posted to Senegal and the West Indies, then served in the American War for Independence. The corps' principal engagements were at White Plains in 1781 and at the Siege of Yorktown in 1781.

=== The American War of Independence ===
The Legion arrived in America and Rochambeau sent Brigadier General Marquis de Choisy with Lauzun's Legion in July 1780, as they marched from Rhode Island to Head of Elk, Maryland. They traveled by water to Alexandria, Virginia and marched to Glouster Courthouse. They spent the winter in Lebanon, Connecticut.

The legion stayed in the United States in Hampton, Virginia, then in Charlotte Court House, Virginia; they were moved to New York in July 1782. They returned to France in May 1783.

==== In Connecticut ====
In December 1780, two dozen Hussar horsemen deserted and fled from their winter quarters in Lebanon into the woods to the south. The Legion itself may have wintered in Trumbull, Connecticut, according to Huldah Hawley, who said that she cooked for the French for fear that they would kill her because her husband was a known Tory. Lauzun's Legion encamped in Abraham Nichols Park in Trumbull from 28 to 30 June 1781. An advance party was ordered to protect the exposed flank of the main army and stayed 10 to 15 miles (16 to 24 km) ahead of the main French army while encamped in Newtown. The army was marching in the Washington–Rochambeau Revolutionary Route south to reinforce American troops under the command of General George Washington at the Siege of Yorktown. French coins have been found near the site of their camp in Abraham Nichols Park.

==== At Yorktown ====
The Legion was at Gloucester, Virginia during the siege of Yorktown. On 4 October 1781, the Legion skirmished at Gloucester with the British Legion, a Loyalist cavalry unit led by Colonel Banastre Tarleton. Tarleton was unhorsed, and Lauzun's Legion drove their opponents back to British lines before being ordered to withdraw by the Marquis de Choisy. The Legion suffered three enlisted men killed and two officers and eleven enlisted men wounded. 50 members of Tarleton's unit were killed or wounded, including Tarleton himself.

==== After the battle ====
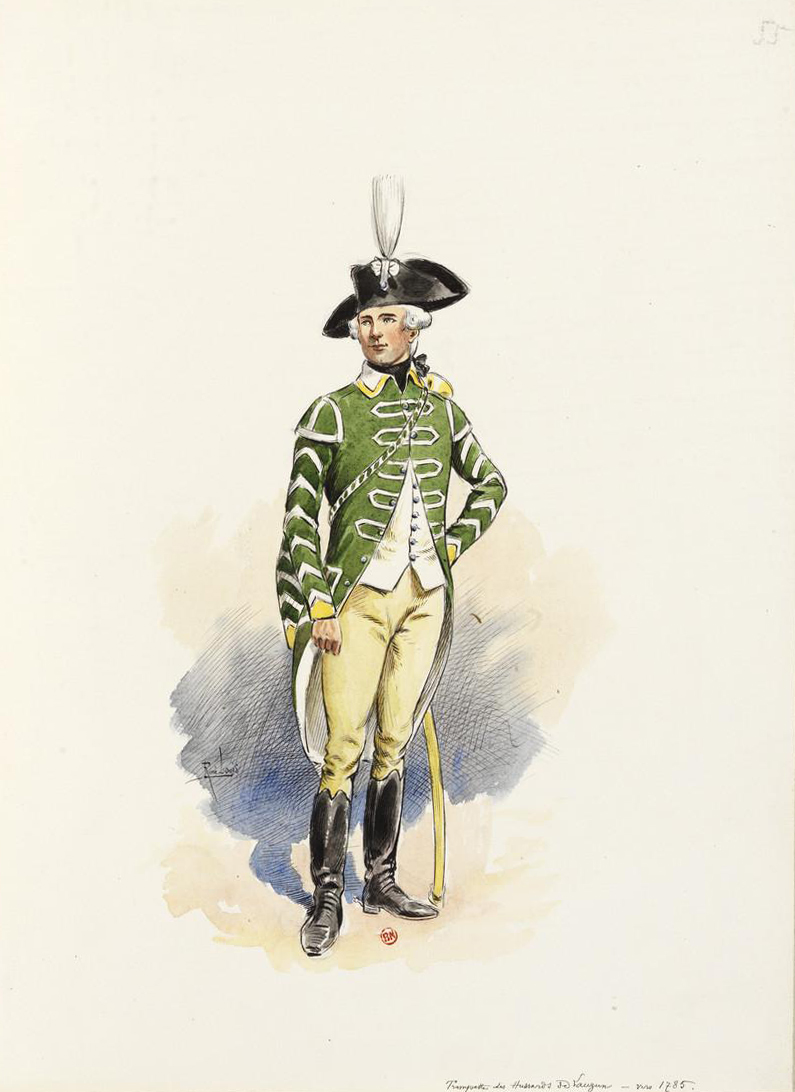
Illustration of a Lauzun's Legion trumpeter in c. 1785

In December 1782, the Legion moved to Wilmington, Delaware where their cash payroll was stolen but recovered. On 9 May 1783 the Legion embarked from Wilmington on la Goire, la Danaë, l"Astree, l'Active, and Le St. James, arriving at Brest, France around 11 June. On 5 October 1783 the Legion's two artillery companies left Baltimore on the Duc de Lauzun and the Pintade; they arrived in Brest on 10 November.

== West Indies ==
When the Legion transferred to America, it left behind its two fusilier companies. These companies transferred to the West Indies. In January–February 1782 they accompanied French naval Captain Armand Guy Simon de Coëtnempren, Comte de Kersaint, with his 32-gun flagship Iphigénie and four lesser ships to Demerara, where they met with little opposition. The detachments from the Regiment Armagnac and the Legion launched an assault against the British garrison compelling Governor Robert Kinston and his army detachment from the 28th Regiment of Foot to surrender. As a result, Essequebo and Berbice also surrendered to the French on 1 and 5 February.

== Return to France ==
The Régiment des Hussards de Lauzun, number 6 (a regular hussar regiment), was officially created on 14 September 1783 in Hennebont, when the Légion de Lauzun des États-Unis returned. Lauzun remained its proprietor until the French Revolution started.

== The French Revolutionary Wars ==
When the revolutionary government declared war on Austria, the regiment fell completely apart as the majority of its officers deserted and handed the regiment's funds, supplies, and records over to the enemy. Subsequent restructuring included:

- 1 January 1791: All regiments were renamed by their type and numbered by their seniority. The unit became 6th Hussar Regiment.
- June 1793: The unit was renamed the 5th Hussar Regiment by Decree of 4 June 1793 after the majority of the soldiers moved to the 4th Hussar Regiment.

== The Napoleonic Wars ==
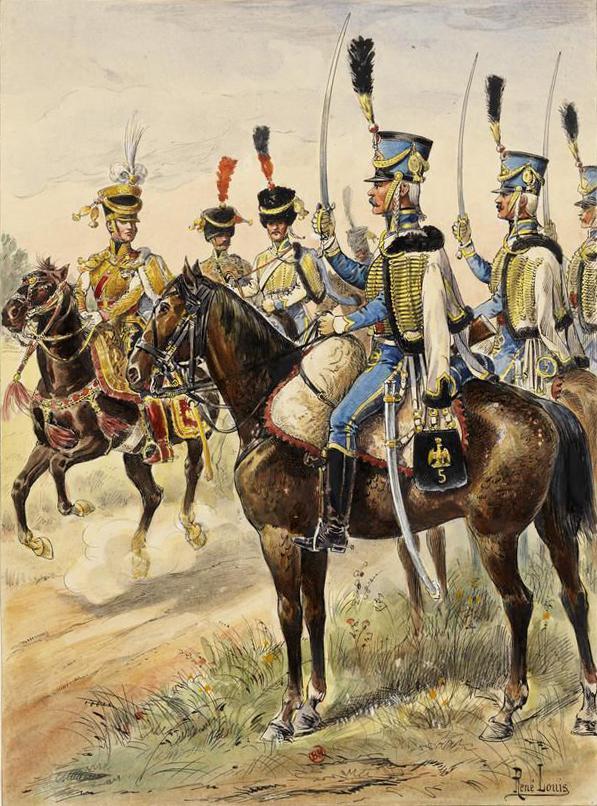
5th Hussar in 1808.

- During the Revolutionary and Napoleonic wars the regiment served in numerous battles, most notably: 1792: Valmy and Jemmapes.(As 6th Regiment of Hussars); 1800: Mosskirch, Biberach, Kirchberg and Hohenlinden; 1805: Austerlitz; 1806: Jena; 1807: Eylau and Konigsberg; 1809: Eckmuhl and Wagram; 1812: Borodino, Moskawa, and Berezina; 1813: Bautzen, Leipzig, and Hanau; 1814: Arcis-sur-Aube; 1815: Ligny, Waterloo, and Versailles, with Battle Honours for Jemmapes, Jena, Eckmuhl, La Moskowa, and Hanau.
- 12 May 1814: The 5th Hussar Regiment became the Régiment des Hussards d'Angoulême
- 22 April 1815: The regiment became again the 5th Hussar Regiment
- 30 November 1815: The 5th Hussar Regiment was dissolved and recreated under the name of the Régiment des Hussards du Bas Rhin

== The 19th Century ==
- 1825: Renamed again to the 5th Regiment of Hussars
- Involved in the French intervention in Mexico

== Twentieth Century ==
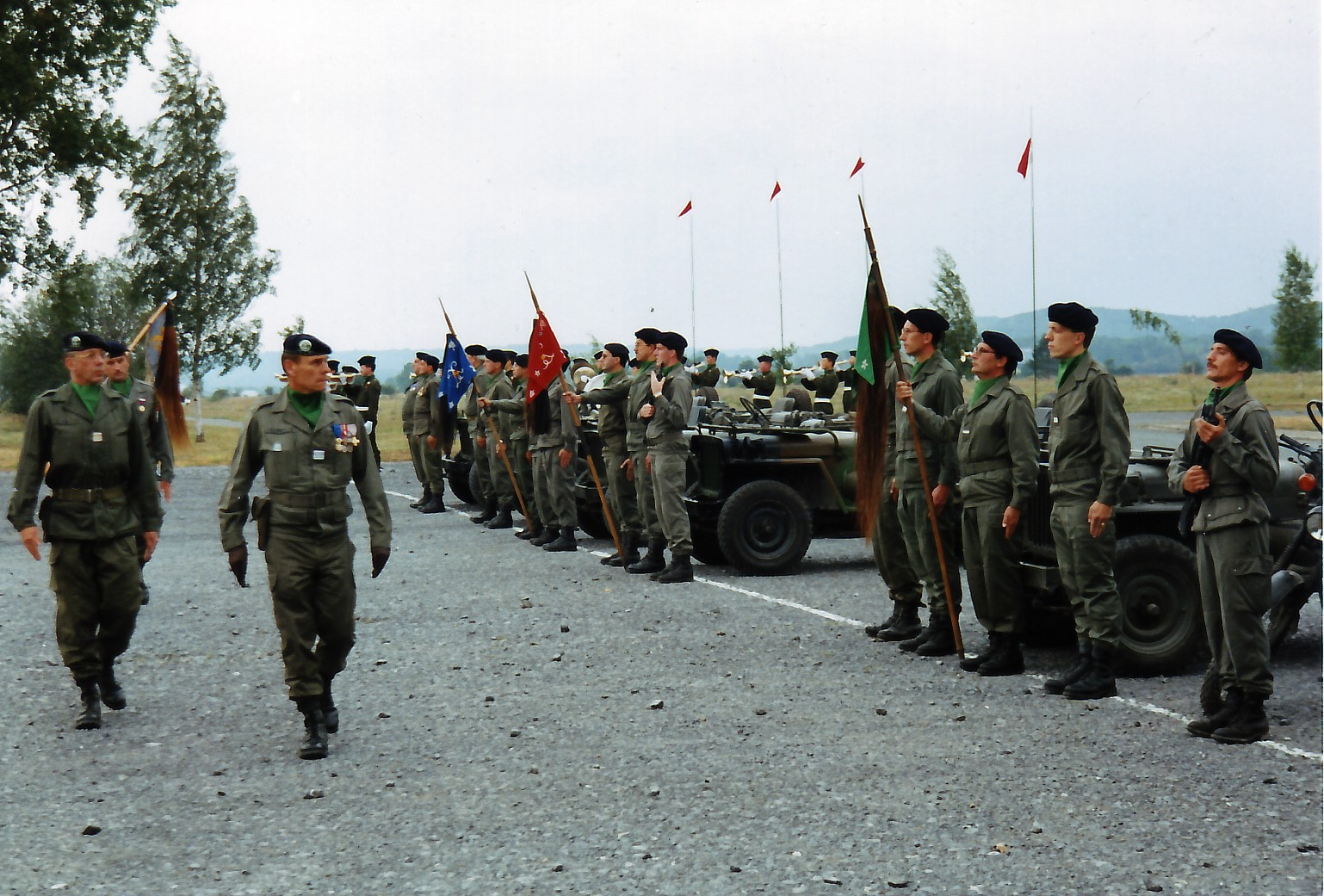
The 1st, 2nd, and 3rd Squadrons of the 5th Hussars, Laon-Couvron, September 1991, reviewed by Colonel d'Evry.

- 1921: Dissolved
- April 1, 1951: Reconstituted at Koblenz (Quartier [barracks] Dejean) under the command of Colonel Louis Bernard. The regiment is equipped with M24 Chaffee tanks
- From August 1951 garrisoned at Fritzlar (Lasalle barracks). The regiment was subsequently re-equipped with AMX-13s
- 1976: Transformed into the 3rd Dragoon Regiment
- 1980: Recreated as the Reserve Regiment of the 5th Hussar Regiment
- On January 1, 1986, the three squadrons of the 5th Hussars, equipped with AMLs, were placed at the disposal of the three divisional combined arms regiments (RIAD) of the 1st Military Region: the 54th Inter-Divisional Regiment (8th Infantry Regiment of Soissons), the 239th Inter-Divisional Regiment (39th Infantry Regiment of Rouen) and the 243rd RIAD (43rd Infantry Regiment of Lille). The training of the three squadrons and the regimental standard remain entrusted to the 2nd Dragoon Regiment at Laon-Couvron.
- The traditions of the 5th Hussars are ensured by Decision No. 0537/DEF/EMAT/MO/MOB of March 20, 1987:
- 1st Squadron/5th RH: 54th RIAD
- 2nd Squadron/5th RH: 239th RIAD
- 3rd Squadron/5th RH: 243rd RIAD

In June 2006, the Dupont Circle Advisory Neighborhood Commission (2B) discussed a proposal to give the P Street Bridge in Washington DC a ceremonial designation to commemorate the 225th anniversary of the end of the American Revolutionary War. On October 14, 2006, the P Street Bridge was ceremonially renamed Lauzun's Legion Bridge for Lauzun's Legion (French: Volontaires-etrangers de Lauzun), commanded by Duc de Lauzun at the Siege of Yorktown. The ceremony was attended by French Ambassador Jean-David Levitte, Jacques Bossiere, and representatives of the D.C. Daughters of the American Revolution and D.C. Children of the American Revolution.

== See also ==
- Armand Louis de Gontaut
