= Gramont family =

French noble family

Coat of arms of Gramont family

The House of Gramont is the name of an old French noble family, whose name is connected to the castle of Gramont (Agramont in Spanish) Basque province of Lower Navarre, France.

== Notable members ==
- Antoine III de Gramont (1604–1678), Military officer and diplomat, with the title Maréchal de France (1641).
- Catherine-Charlotte de Gramont (1639–1678), princesse de Monaco and mistress of Louis XIV, daughter of the previous.
- Guy Armand de Gramont, Comte de Guiche (1637-1673), notable adventurer and playboy. Openly bisexual, he was a lover of Prince Philippe of France, and (allegedly) of Philippe's wife, Henrietta of England. Son of first, brother of second.
- Antoine V de Gramont (1671–1725), duc de Gramont (also named duc de Guiche), Maréchal de France (1724), grandson of the first.
- Louis of Gramont (1689–1745), defeated in the Battle of Dettingen and killed in the Battle of Fontenoy, son of Antoine V.
- Eugénie de Gramont (1788–1846), religious figure, granddaughter of Antoine Adrien, comte de Gramont (1726–1762).
- Antoine-Geneviève-Héraclius-Agénor de Gramont (1789–1854), duc de Gramont, court figure with close relations to the Bourbons, great-great-grandson of Antoine V.
- Agénor de Gramont, 10th Duke of Gramont (1819–1880), duke of Gramont and prince of Bidache, French diplomat and statesman, son of the previous.
- Agénor de Gramont, 11th Duke of Gramont (1851–1925), duke of Gramont and prince of Bidache, French soldier, son of the previous.
- Antoine Alfred Arnaud Xavier Louis de Gramont (1861–1923), Count, French spectroscopist
- Élisabeth de Gramont (1875–1954), Duchess of Clermont-Tonnerre, French writer
- Armand de Gramont, 12th Duke of Gramont (1879–1962), duke of Gramont, French nobleman, scientist and industrialist, brother of previous.
- Louis de Gramont (1854–1912), son of Ferdinand, French dramatist and librettist.
- Louis-René Alexandre de Gramont (1883–1963), comte de Gramont, son of Agénor de Gramont (1851–1925), Commandeur de la Légion d'honneur and Croix de guerre 1914–1918.
- Henri de Gramont, 13th Duke of Gramont (1907–1995), duke of Gramont, French nobleman.
- Gabriel Antoine Armand, Comte de Gramont (1908–1943), a hero of the French Resistance, grandson of Agénor de Gramont (1819–1880) duc de Gramont and prince de Bidache.
- Philipppe Agénor Marie Antoine de Gramont (1917–1940) son of Louis-René de Gramont, comte de Gramont, Chevalier de la Légion d'honneur.
- Marguerite Corisande Alexandrine Marie de Gramont (1920–1998) baronne Philippe de Gunzbourg, daughter of comte de Gramont, Officier of Légion d'honneur and Croix de guerre.
- René Armand Antoine de Gramont (1927–2004) son of Louis-René de Gramont, comte de Gramont.
- François Marie Louis Antoine de Gramont (1931–1955) son of Louis-René de Gramont, comte de Gramont.
- Sanche de Gramont (1932–2023), son of the previous, gave up his titles and became a naturalized citizen of the United States under the name Ted Morgan.
- Arnaud François Louis Victurnien de Gramont (1960 - ) son of comte René de Gramont (1927–2004), photographer.

== Gallery ==
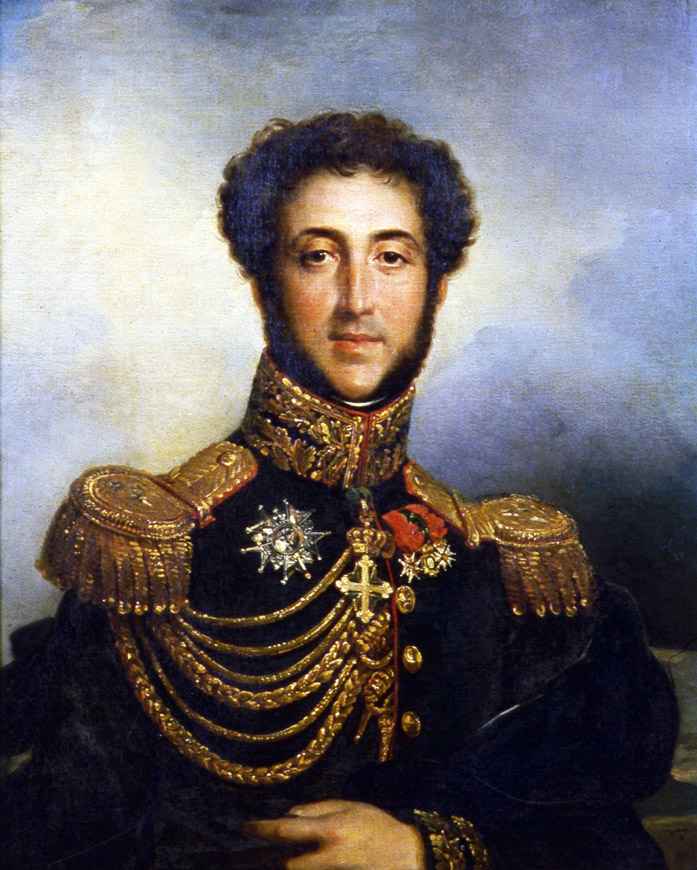
Héraclius de Gramont, 9th Duke of Gramont, by François Gérard, between 1810 and 1855

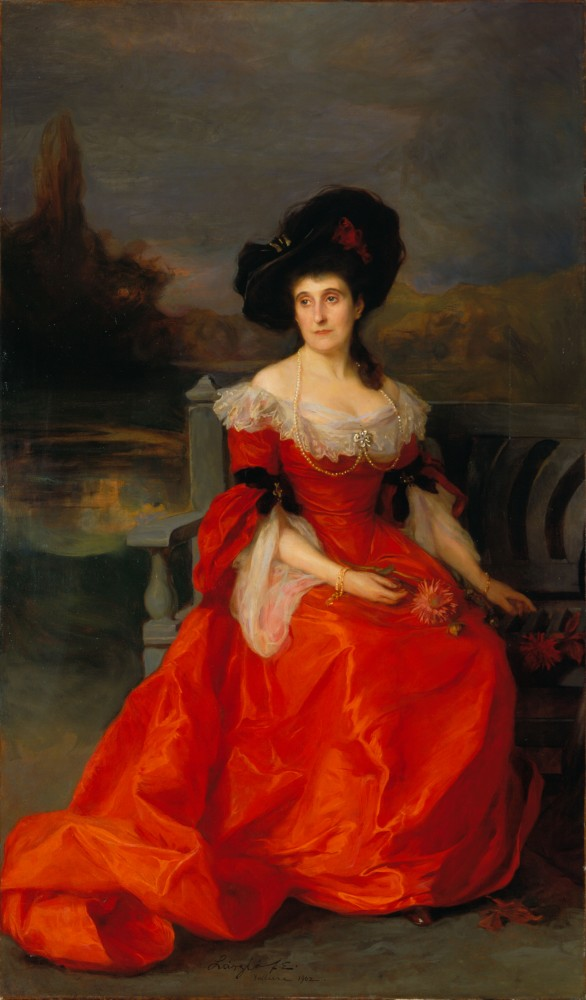
Marguerite de Rothschild (second wife of the 11th Duke of Gramont), by Philip de László, 1902

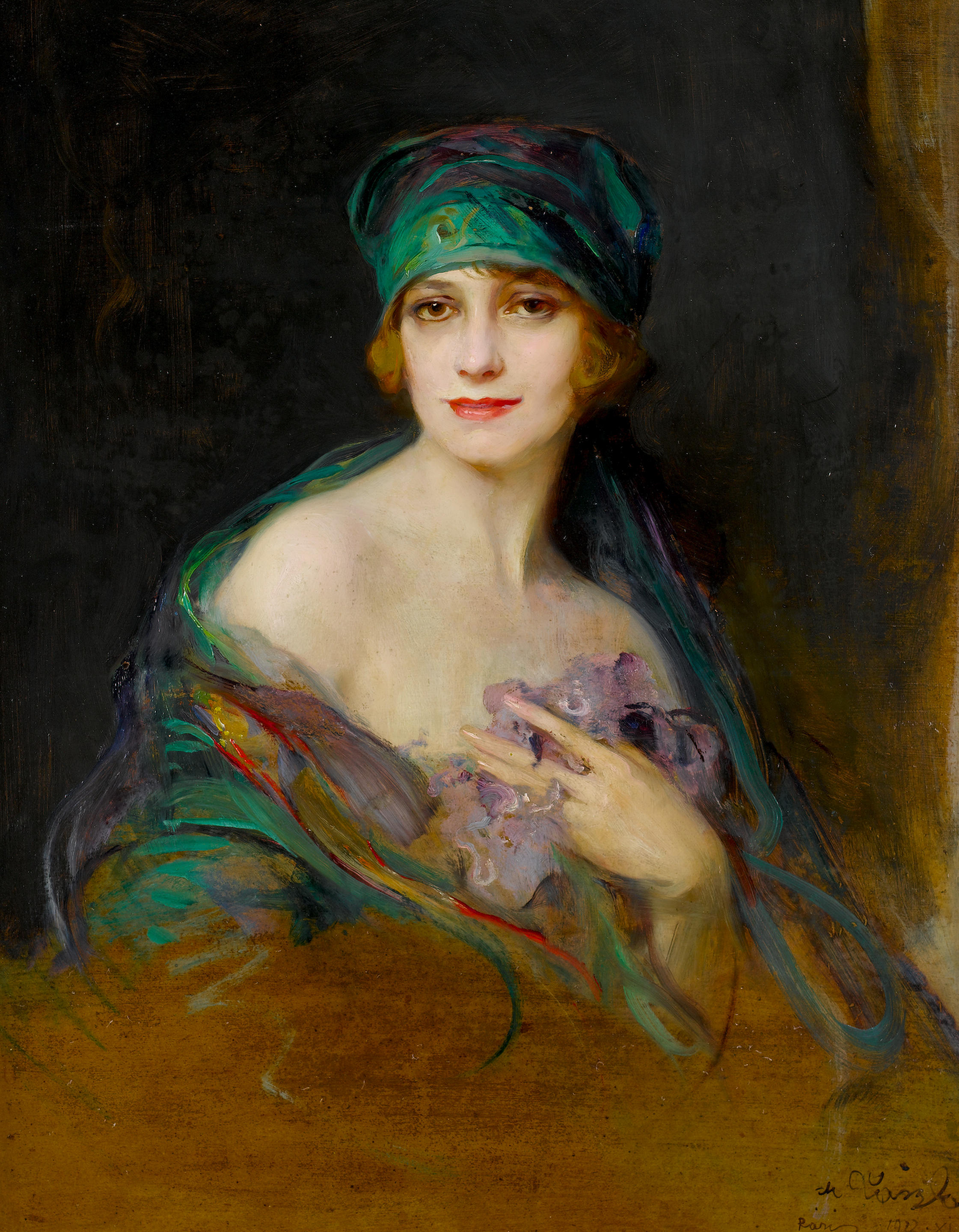
Princess Marie Ruspoli (third wife of the 11th Duke of Gramont), by Philip de László, 1922

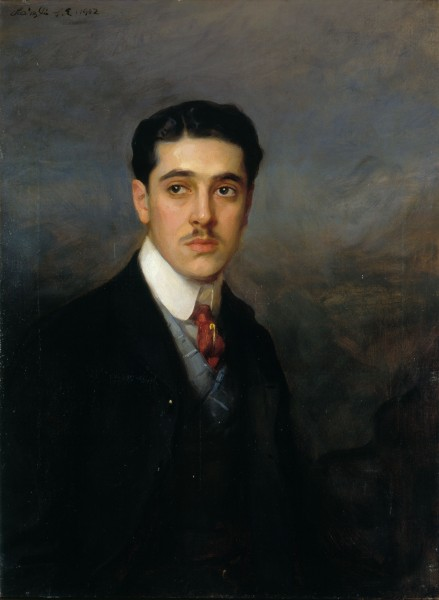
Louis-René de Gramont, 12th Duke of Gramont, by Philip de László, 1902

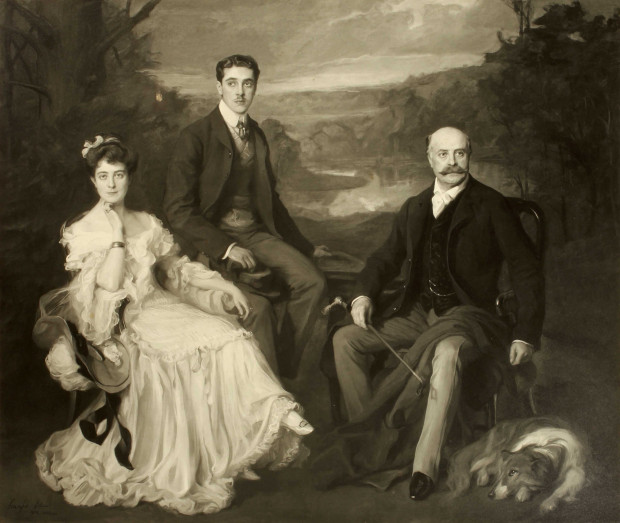
Duchess Elisabeth de Clermont-Tonnerre, Count Louis-René de Gramont, and Duke Agénor de Gramont, by Philip de László, 1902

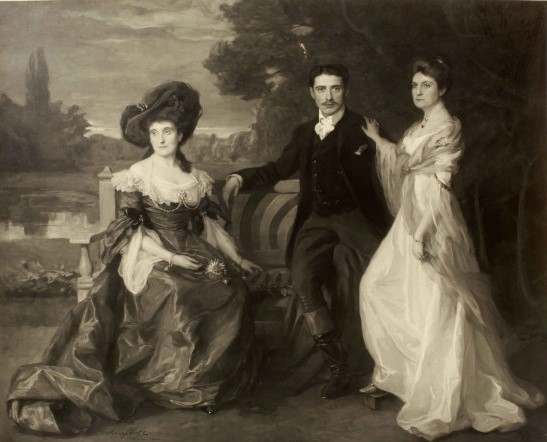
Duchess Marguerite de Gramont, Armand, Duke of Guiche, and Corisande de Gramont, by Philip de László, 1902

== See also ==
- Duc de Gramont

== Bibliography ==
- Jean de Jaurgain and Raymond Ritter, La maison de Gramont 1040-1967, Les amis du musée pyrénéen, Tarbes (two volumes) (in French)
- Lewis, Warren Hamilton (1958), Assault on Olympus - The rise of the House of Gramont between 1604 and 1678, New York: Harcourt, Brace & Co
