= Élisabeth de Gramont =

French writer (1875-1954)

- Duchess of Clermont-Tonnerre
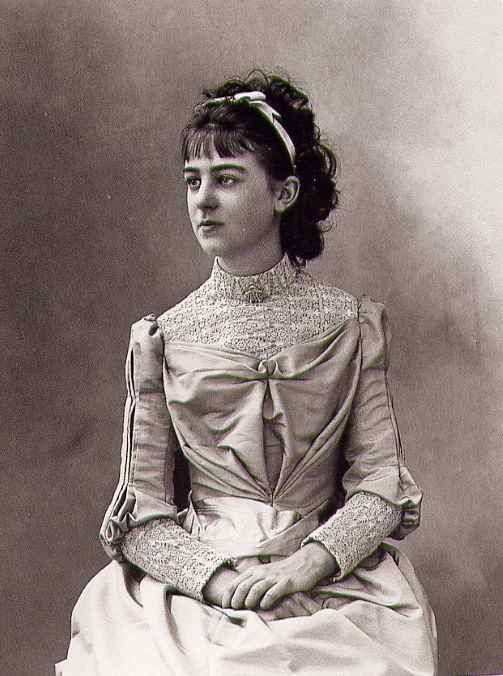
- Photograph of Elisabeth de Gramont by Nadar
- Born: Antonia Corisande Élisabeth de Gramont; 23 April 1875; Nancy, French Third Republic
- Died: 6 December 1954 (aged 79); Paris, France
- Buried: Ancy-le-Franc
- Noble family: de Gramont
- Spouses: Philibert, Duke of Clermont-Tonnerre (m. 1896; div. 1920)
- Issue: Béatrix de Clermont Tonnerre; Diane de Clermont Tonnerre
- Father: Agénor de Gramont, 11th Duke of Gramont
- Mother: Princesse Isabelle de Beauvau-Craon
- Occupation: Author

Antoinette Corisande Élisabeth, Duchess of Clermont-Tonnerre (née de Gramont; 23 April 1875 – 6 December 1954) was a French writer of the early 20th century, best known for her long-term lesbian relationship with Natalie Clifford Barney, an American writer. Élisabeth de Gramont had grown up among the highest aristocracy; when she was a child, according to Janet Flanner, "peasants on her farm... begged her not to clean her shoes before entering their houses". She looked back on this lost world of wealth and privilege with little regret, and became known as the "red duchess" for her support of socialism and feminism.

She was a close friend, and sometimes critic of writer Marcel Proust, whom she first met in 1903.

== Early life ==
Antonia Corisande Élisabeth de Gramont was born on 23 April 1875 in Nancy, France. Called "Lily", she was the daughter of Agénor de Gramont, 11th Duke of Gramont, and his first wife, née Princesse Isabelle de Beauvau-Craon. Her mother died giving birth to her. Her father soon married again to the wealthy Marguerite de Rothschild.

Gramont was educated for her class. She later participated in Popular Front parades, and supported politicians of the left.

== Personal life ==
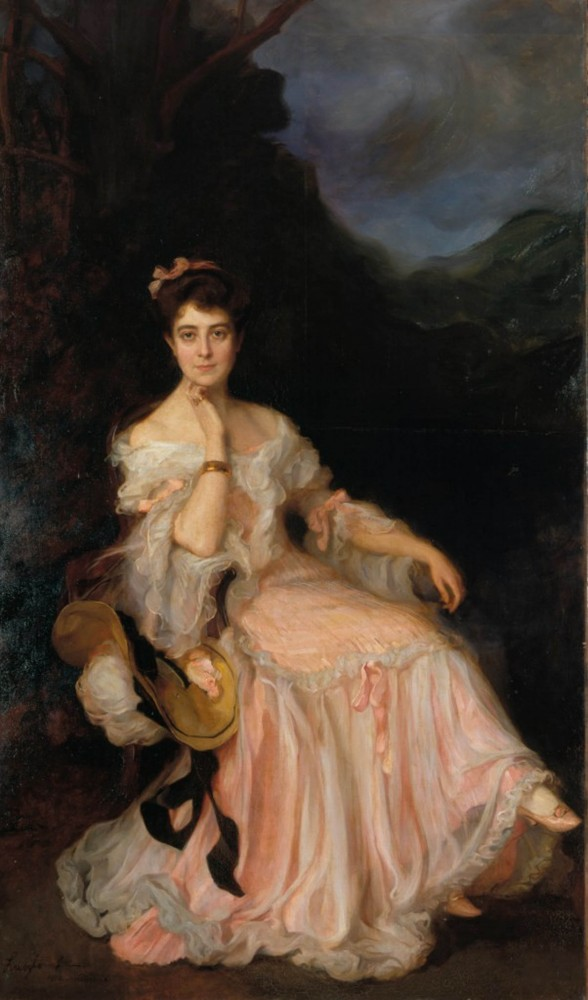
Portrait of the Duchess, by Philip de László, 1902

In 1896, Élisabeth married Aimé François Philibert, 8th Duke of Clermont-Tonnerre (1871–1940), a son of Gaspard Aimé Charles Roger, 7th Duke of Clermont-Tonnerre and Françoise Béatrix de Moustier. He owned several estates, including the Château de Glisolles in the Eure department. Before their divorce in 1920, they had two daughters together:

- Antonia Béatrix Corisande de Clermont Tonnerre (1897–1930), who suffered from tuberculosis; she eloped with the Duke's secretary, André Gault in 1921. They divorced in 1924.
- Isabelle Gabrielle Diane de Clermont Tonnerre (1902–1950), who married Count Guy Ghislain de Berlaymont, in 1924.

In 1921, she sued the Duke alleging that he "wrongfully appropriated many valuable works of art and detained for his own uses 3,500,000 francs of her money."

She died in Paris on 6 December 1954, outliving her former husband and both daughters, and is buried at Ancy-le-Franc, near the family Château de Clermont-Tonnerre.

=== Natalie Barney ===
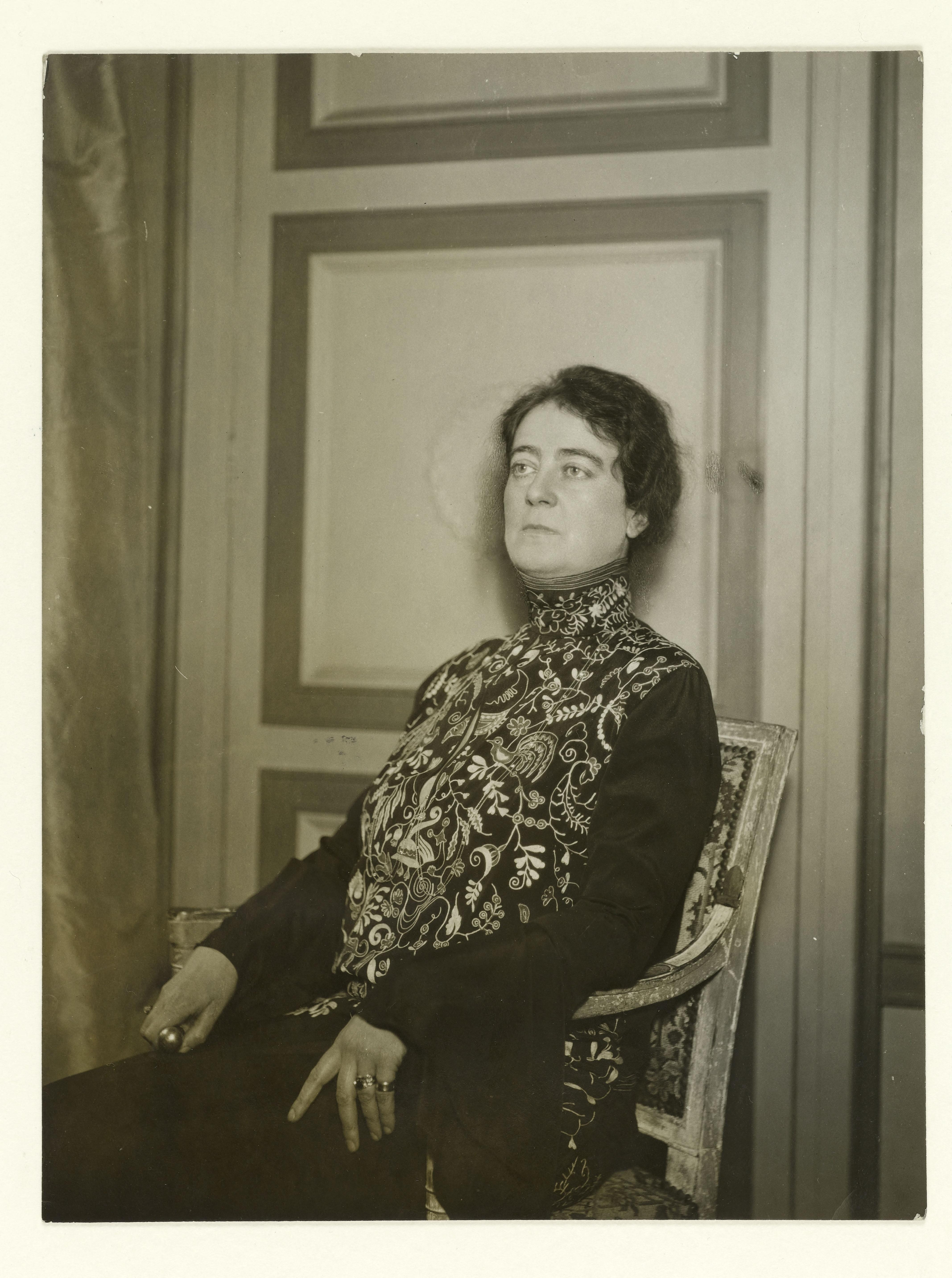
Photograph of the Duchess, by Thérèse Bonney, 1924

American writer Natalie Barney and Duchess de Clermont-Tonnerre first met in the spring of 1909; they became lovers on 1 May 1910, a date that they celebrated as their anniversary. Although neither was faithful to the other sexually, they were devoted to one another for their entire lives. Elisabeth's husband is said to have been violent and tyrannical.

The Duchess accepted Barney's ways—perhaps reluctantly at first—and went out of her way to be gracious to Barney's other lovers. For example, the Duchess always included Romaine Brooks when she invited Barney to vacation in the country. Brooks and Barney developed a strong relationship about 1916, and both de Gramont and Brooks had to live with Barney's infidelity. But the three women eventually formed a kind of trio and were devoted to one another for the rest of their lives.

On 20 June 1918 Barney and De Gramont filed an "unofficial" but, at least to them, binding "marriage contract". The contract stated, in part;

"After nine years of life together, joys and worries shared, and affairs confessed. For the survival of the bond that we believe-and wish to believe-is unbreakable, since at its lowest level of reciprocal emotionalism that is the conclusion reached. The union, sorely tried by the passing years, failed doubly the faithfulness test in its sixth year, showing us that adultery is inevitable in these relationships where there is no prejudice, no religion other than feelings, no laws other than desire, incapable of vain sacrifices that seem to be the negation of life..."

In essence, the contract was to bind them together, at least in their own minds, but did not require them to being only with one another sexually. The contract was honored by both until the Duchess' death in 1954.

== Bibliography ==
- Almanach des bonnes chances de France, 1930
- Le Diable chez la marquise, Littéraires, ca; 1938
- Autour de Saint-James, Du Pavois (publishers), 1945
- Barbey d'Aurevilly, Grasset, 1946
- La Famille des Clermont-Tonnerre, Fasquelle, 1950
- La Femme et la robe, La Palatine, Paris, Geneva, 1952
- Le Comte d'Orsay et Lady Blessington, 1955
- Marcel Proust, Flammarion, 1948
- Mémoires d'Élisabeth de Gramont, Grasset, 1929
- Souvenirs du monde de 1890 à 1940

== Sources ==
Diana Souhami (2007). Wild Girls: Paris, Sappho, and Art: The Lives and Loves of Natalie Barney and Romaine Brooks. Macmillan. ISBN 978-0-312-36660-5.
