= Antoine de Gramont, 4th Duke of Gramont =

Marshal of France (1672–1725)

Antoine de Gramont
- 4th Duke of Gramont
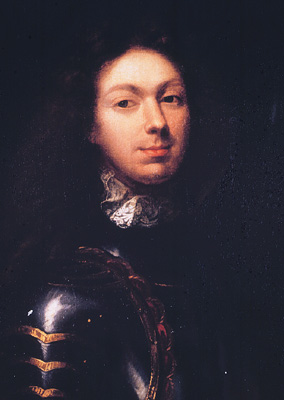
- Undated portrait of Antoine de Gramont.
- Born: January 1672
- Died: 16 September 1725 (aged 53)
- Spouse: Marie Christine de Noailles
- Issue: Louis de Gramont, 6th Duke of Gramont
- Parents: Antoine Charles IV de Gramont
- Mother: Marie Charlotte de Castelnau
- Occupation: Marshal of France

Antoine de Gramont, 4th Duke of Gramont (January 1672 – 16 September 1725), Duke of Guiche, was a Marshal of France.

== Early life ==
French military figure and member of the House of Gramont, he was the oldest child of Antoine Charles IV de Gramont and Marie Charlotte de Castelnau (1648 – 29 January 1694), daughter of Marshal Castelnau.

== Biography ==
At the age of thirteen, he became a musketeer and by 1687 he had become head of his regiment. He participated in the Siege of Philippsburg (1688) and the Battle of Landen (1693). He was made brigadier in 1694 and served in Flanders.

In 1696, he was serving under Marshal Catinat and Marshal Boufflers, and was himself made a marshal (of Flanders) and Colonel General of Dragoons in 1702. In 1704, he made lieutenant of the royal arms and, on 26 October 1704, Colonel General of the French guards. He became envoy to Philip V of Spain in 1705. He was wounded at the Battle of Malplaquet (1709).

In 1712, he became Lieutenant General of Bayonne and Lieutenant General and Governor of Navarre and Béarn. In 1715, he became Counselor of Regents and War and in 1720, acquired the title of Duke of Gramont. In 1724, he became Marshal of France. He died a year later, evidently in his palace.

== Personal life ==
He had married Marie Christine de Noailles (1672-1748), daughter of Anne Jules de Noailles, 2nd Duke of Noailles and his wife, Marie Françoise de Bournonville (1654-1748). They had 5 children :

- Antoine VI de Gramont (1688-1741), lieutenant-general, no surviving sons.
- Louis de Gramont, 6th Duke of Gramont (1689-1745), colonel-general, had male issue.
- Marie-Adélaïde de Gramont (1700-1740), married François Armand de Gontaut, son of Charles Armand de Gontaut, Duke of Biron.
- Catherine-Charlotte-Thérèse de Gramont (1707-1755), married Philippe-Alexandre, prince de Bournonville (died 1727) and Jacques Louis de Rouvroy, son of Louis de Rouvroy, duc de Saint-Simon.
- Louis François de Gramont (1708-1714).

== Notes ==
French nobility
Preceded by Antoine IV	Duke of Gramont; 1720–1725	Succeeded by Antoine VI
