= Louis Antoine de Gontaut, 6th Duke of Biron =

French military leader

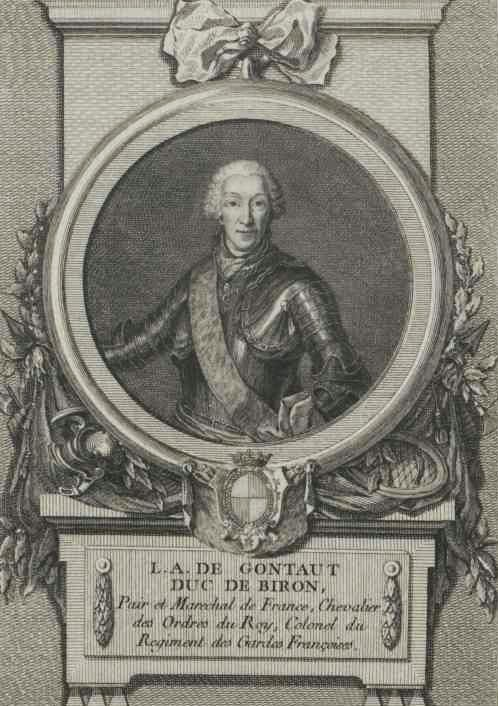

Louis Antoine de Gontaut, 6th Duke of Biron (1700–1788) was Duke of Biron and a French military leader who served with distinction under Louis XV, and was made a Marshal of France in 1757.

== Biography ==
He was the fourth son of Charles Armand de Gontaut, Duke of Biron, and Marie Antoinette, Duchess of Lauzun. He joined the army as an adolescent. During the War of the Polish Succession, he fought in Italy (Siege of Pizzighettone, attack on the Milan castle, Tortona, Battle of San Pietro and the Battle of Guastalla).

In the War of the Austrian Succession, he participated in 1741 in the invasion of Moravia and the Siege of Prague (1742), where he was badly wounded. After his return to France, he fought in the Battle of Dettingen (1743) and the Sieges of Menin, Furnes, Ypres and Fribourg (1744).
In 1745, during the Battle of Fontenoy, he became a hero, when he took over the command of a regiment of Gardes Françaises after its commander, Louis de Gramont, had been killed, and saved the difficult situation the regiment was in.

Again employed in the Army of Flanders on 1 April 1746, he commanded the reserve at the Battle of Rocoux on 11 October. Lieutenant General at the Battle of Lauffeld on 2 July 1747, he led the final attack, and had a horse killed under him. He became Marshal of France in 1757 at the beginning of the Seven Years' War, in which he didn't take part any more.

Biron was very popular amongst his soldiers. It is said that some of his men risked their lives to save his, when in 1770 Biron was caught in a stampede caused by fireworks.

In 1753, he bought the Hôtel Biron from Anne, Duchess of Maine, which still can be visited today as it houses the Musée Rodin. After his death, the title of Duc de Biron passed to his nephew Armand Louis de Gontaut.
