= Charles Armand de Gontaut, Duke of Biron =

French military leader

The Marshal-Duke of Biron
- 2nd Duke of Biron
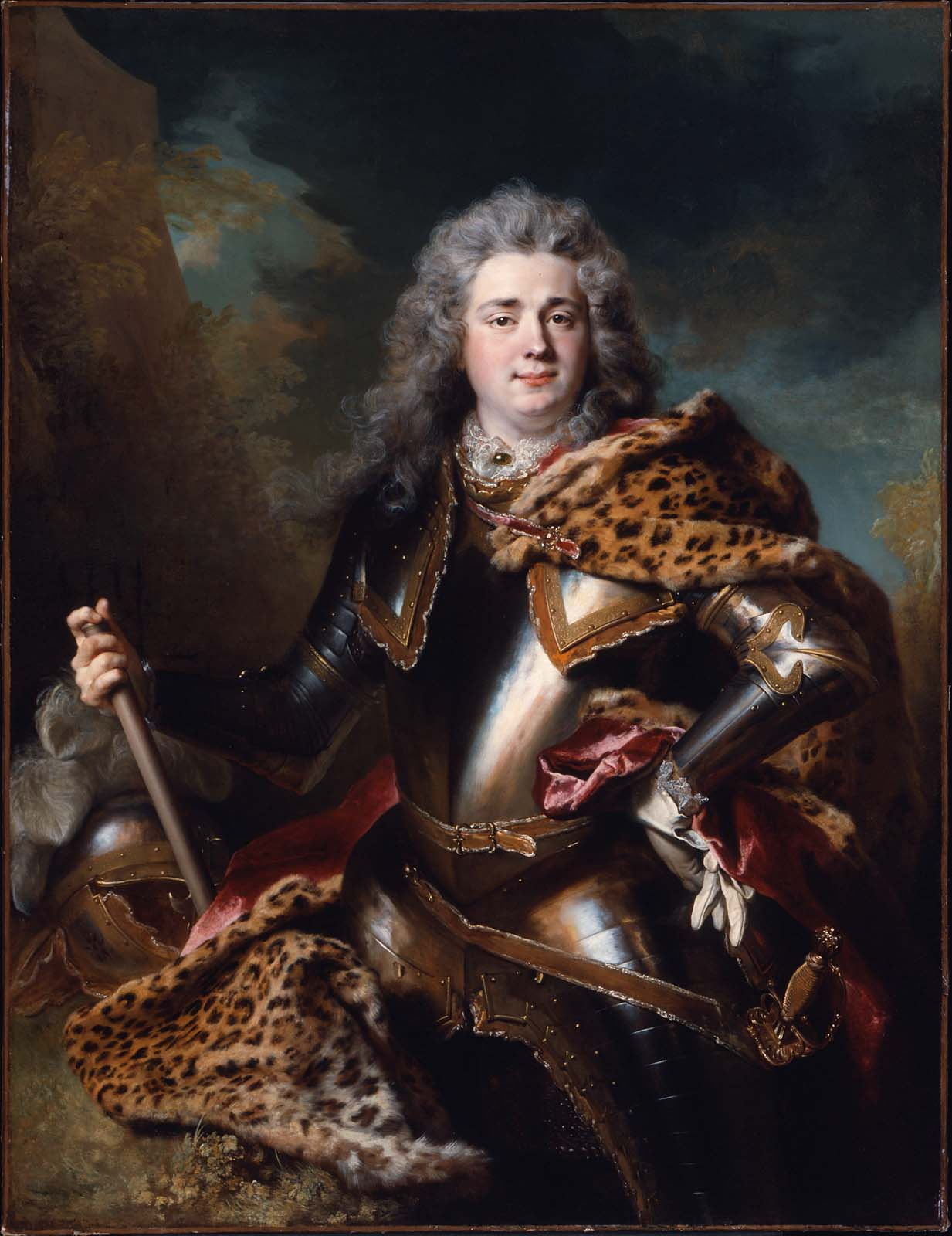
- circa 1714 portrait of Charles Armand by Nicolas de Largillière (Boston Museum of Fine Arts).
- Full name: Charles Armand de Gontaut
- Born: 5 August 1663
- Died: 23 July 1756 (aged 92)
- Spouse: Marie Antoinette de Caumont (1686)
- Issue: Louis Antoine de Gontaut, 3rd Duke of Biron; Charles Antoine, 4th Duke of Biron; Geneviève, Duchess of Gramont; Judith Charlotte, Countess of Bonneval
- Father: François de Gontaut, Marquis of Biron
- Mother: Élisabeth de Cossé

Charles Armand de Gontaut, 2nd Duke of Biron (5 August 1663 – 23 July 1756), great-grandson of Armand de Gontaut-Biron, was a French military leader who served with distinction under Louis XIV and Louis XV, and was made a Marshal of France by the latter.

== Biography ==
Born in a noble family, he was the great-grandson of Armand de Gontaut, Baron of Biron, Marshal of France.
He fought in the Nine Years' War, in Italy, Germany and Ireland. He also participated in the Battle of Neerwinden (1693) in Flanders.

During the War of the Spanish Succession, he fought in Flanders between 1703 and 1708. He commanded the French vanguard at the Battle of Oudenaarde (1708), and noticed the first manoeuvre of deviation by Marlborough. Nevertheless, opposed on his lines by numerical superior forces, he was unable to change the course of events that were to happen and was taken prisoner.
Released in 1712, he was wounded at the Siege of Landau (1713) and became commander of this city after its capture. He would remain Governor of Landau until 1747.

=== Marriage and children ===
He married Marie-Antoinette, duchesse de Lauzun and niece of Antoine Nompar de Caumont, duc de Lauzun.

They had 14 children among whom were

1. Louis Antoine de Gontaut (1700–1788), Marshal of France.
2. Charles Antoine (1708–1800), Duc de Biron and father of the memoirist Armand Louis de Gontaut, duc de Biron 1747–1793.
3. Madeleine Françoise d’Usson de Bonnac married to Jean-Louis d'Usson.
4. Judith Charlotte married Claude Alexandre de Bonneval.
5. Geneviève, married Louis duc de Gramont, son of Antoine V de Gramont.

He died at age 92. When he died, his wife, ten of his 14 children, twelve of 32 grandchildren and eight of his 47 great-grandchildren had died before him. All his grandchildren and 24 great-grandchildren were born in his lifetime.
