= Antonin Nompar de Caumont, 1st Duke of Lauzun =

French courtier and soldier

Antonin Nompar de Caumont
- 1st Duke of Lauzun
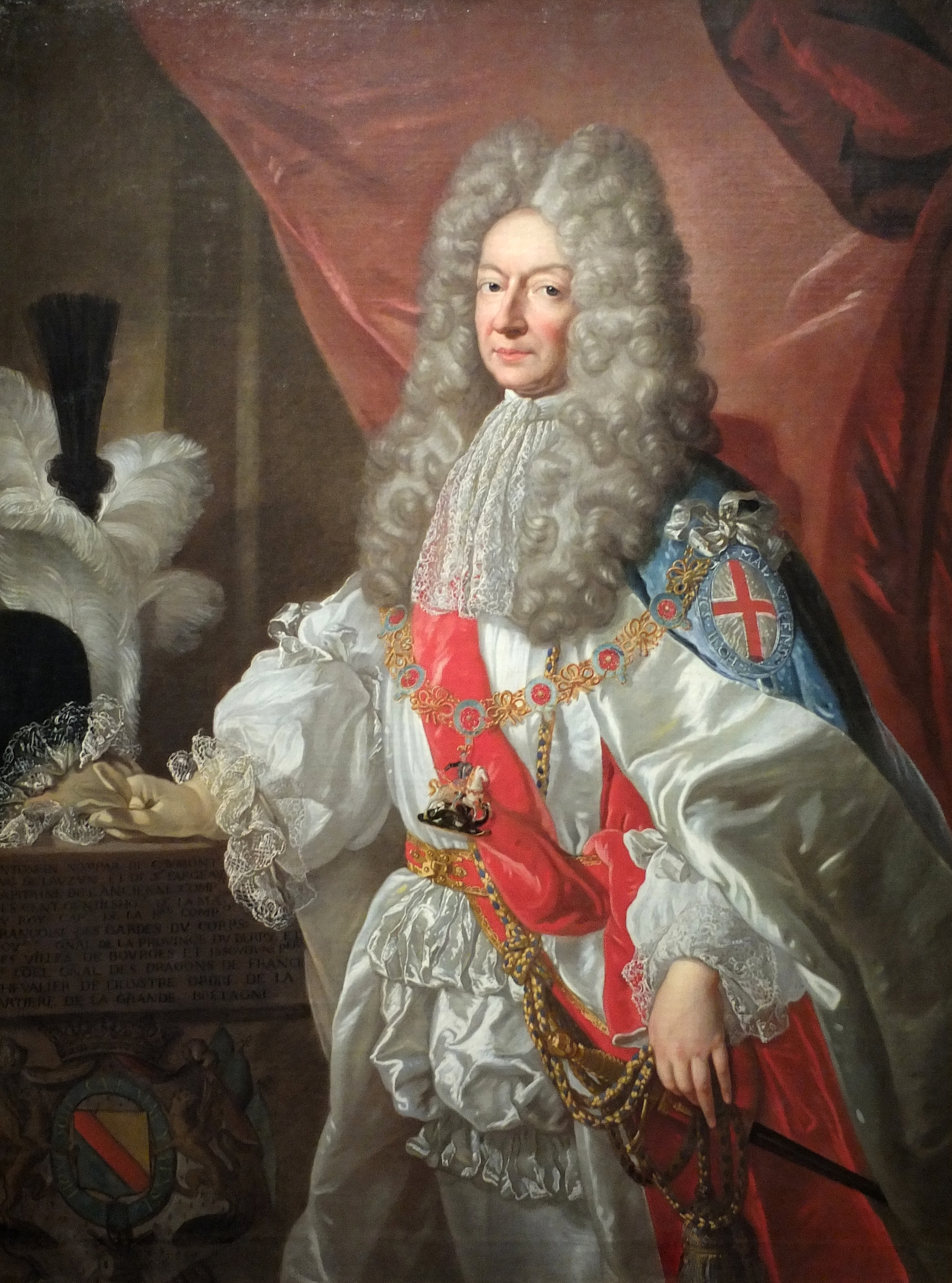
- Portrait by Alexis Simon Belle, 1700
- Full name: Antonin Nompar de Caumont
- Other titles: Count of Puyguilhem
- Born: 1632; Lauzun, France
- Died: 19 November 1723 (aged 90); France
- Spouses: La Grande Mademoiselle (secret); Geneviève Marie de Durfort
- Issue: None
- Father: Gabriel de Caumont, Count of Lauzun
- Mother: Charlotte de Caumont

Antonin Nompar de Caumont, 1st Duke of Lauzun (French pronunciation: [ɑ̃tɔnɛ̃ nɔ̃paʁ də komɔ̃ dyk də lozœ̃], 1632 – 19 November 1723) was a French courtier and soldier. He was the only love interest of the "greatest heiress in Europe," Anne Marie Louise d'Orléans, Duchess of Montpensier, cousin of Louis XIV.

He is often noted for his command of a French expeditionary Brigade which served alongside the Jacobite Irish Army during the Williamite War. After defeat at the Battle of the Boyne in July 1690 his brigade retreated to Galway where it was evacuated to France. Nonetheless, he remained an influential figure at the Jacobite court in exile, particularly with Mary of Modena.

== Biography ==
He was the son of Gabriel de Caumont, Count of Lauzun (1590-1660), and his wife, Charlotte de Caumont de La Force (1606-1689), daughter of Henri Nompar de Caumont, Duke of La Force, both members of an old French nobility. He was brought up with the children of his relative, the maréchal-duc Antoine III de Gramont. One daughter, Catherine Charlotte, afterwards princess of Monaco by marriage to Louis I, Prince of Monaco, was the object of the one passion of Lauzun's life.

He entered the army, and served under Turenne, also his kinsman, and in 1655 succeeded his father as commander of the cent gentilshommes de la maison de roi. Then known as the comte de Puyguilhem (or Péguilin, as contemporaries simplified his name), he rose rapidly in Louis XIV's favour, became colonel of the royal regiment of dragoons, and was gazetted maréchal de camp. He and Madame de Monaco belonged to the côterie of the young Duchess of Orléans. His rough wit and skill in practical jokes pleased Louis XIV, but his jealousy and violence were the causes of his undoing. He prevented a meeting between Louis XIV and Madame de Monaco, and jealousy in that matter, rather than hostility to Louise de La Vallière, led him to promote Madame de Montespan's intrigues with the king. He asked that lady to secure for him the post of grand-master of the artillery, and on Louis's refusal to give him the appointment, he turned his back on the king, broke his sword and swore that never again would he serve a monarch who had broken his word. The result was a short sojourn in the Bastille, but he soon returned to his function as court buffoon.

Meanwhile, Anne, Duchess of Montpensier (La Grande Mademoiselle) had fallen in love with the little man, whose ugliness seems to have exercised a certain fascination over many women. He naturally encouraged one of the greatest heiresses in Europe, and the wedding was fixed for 21 December 1670. Then, on the 18th, Louis sent for his cousin and forbade the marriage. Madame de Montespan had never forgiven Lauzun's fury when she failed to procure the grand-mastership of the artillery, and now, with Louvois, secured his arrest to the Bastille on 25 November 1671. Two days later, he was removed to Pignerol, where excessive precautions were taken to ensure that he was firmly held. He was eventually allowed to meet another prisoner, Fouquet, but before that time he managed to find a way through the chimney into Fouquet's room, and on another occasion succeeded in reaching the courtyard in safety. Another fellow-prisoner, from communication with whom he was supposed to be rigorously excluded, was Eustache Dauger (see Man in the Iron Mask), who occasionally served as valet to Fouquet.

In his reports to his superiors in Paris, the prison governor, Bénigne Dauvergne de Saint-Mars, tells how Lauzun displayed evidence of deranged behaviour at this time: his cell was in constant disarray and he grew his beard to the point that it gave him a wild appearance. An attempted escape was foiled when, on emerging from his tunnel, he came across a maid who raised the alarm.

It was now intimated to Mademoiselle that Lauzun's restoration to liberty depended on her immediate settlement of the principality of Dombes, the county of Eu and the duchy of Aumale – three properties assigned by her to Lauzun – on Louis Auguste de Bourbon, Duke of Maine, eldest legitimised son of Louis XIV and Madame de Montespan. She gave way, but Lauzun, even after ten years of imprisonment, refused to sign the documents, when he was brought to Bourbon for the purpose. A short term of imprisonment at Chalon-sur-Saône made him change his mind, but when he was set free Louis XIV was still set against the marriage, which is supposed to have taken place secretly.

Married or not, Lauzun was openly courting Nicolas Fouquet's daughter, whom he had seen at Pignerol. He was to be restored to his place at court, and to marry Mademoiselle Fouquet, who, however, became Duchess d'Uzès in 1683.

In 1685 Lauzun went to England to seek his fortune under James II, whom he had served as Duke of York in Flanders. He rapidly gained great influence at the English court. In 1688 he was again in England, and arranged the journey into exile of Mary of Modena and the infant prince, whom he accompanied to Calais, where he received strict instructions from Louis to bring them "on any pretext" to Vincennes.

In the late autumn of 1689 he was put in command of the expedition fitted out at Brest for service in Ireland, and he sailed in the following year. Lauzun was honest, a quality not too common in James II's officials in Ireland, but had no experience of the field, and he blindly followed Richard Talbot, Earl of Tyrconnel. After the battle of the Boyne they fled to Limerick, and thence to the west, leaving Patrick Sarsfield to show a brave front. In September they sailed for France, and on their arrival at Versailles Lauzun found that his failure had destroyed any prospect of a return of Louis XIV's favour. In 1692, under the influence of Mary of Modena he was created Duke of Lauzun.

Mademoiselle died in 1693, and two years later Lauzun married Geneviève Marie de Durfort (1680-1729), a child of fourteen, daughter of the Guy Aldonce de Durfort, Duke de Lorges. Queen Mary, through whose interest Lauzun secured his dukedom, retained her faith in him, and it was he who in 1715, more than a quarter of a century after the flight from Whitehall, brought her the news of the Battle of Sheriffmuir. After his death, the dukedom of Lauzun fell to his niece's husband, Charles Armand de Gontaut.

See the letters of Madame de Sévigné and the memoirs of Saint-Simon, who was Lauzun's wife's brother-in-law.
