= Louis de Gramont, 6th Duke of Gramont =

French general (1689–1745)

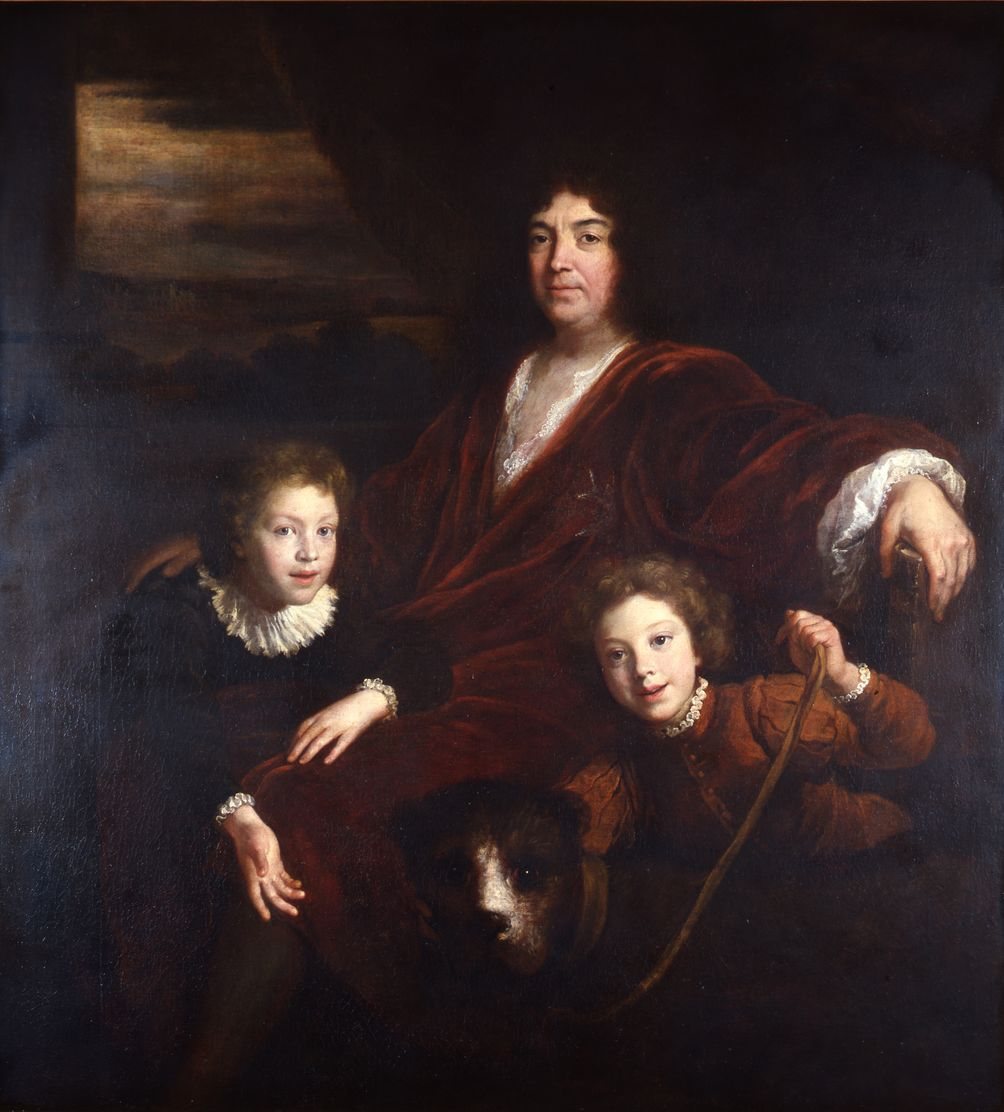
Louis and his two sons: Antoine VII and Antoine Adrien

Louis de Gramont, 6th Duke of Gramont (29 May 1689 – Battle of Fontenoy, 11 May 1745) was Duke of Gramont and a French general in the War of Austrian Succession.

== Biography ==
Louis was the son of Marshal of France Antoine V de Gramont and Marie-Christine de Noailles (1672–1748), daughter of Marshal of France Anne-Jules, 2nd duc de Noailles. He became Duke of Gramont after the death of his elder brother Antoine VI in 1741.

Louis is best known for his role in the Battle of Dettingen, when his uncle Adrien-Maurice, 3rd duc de Noailles had manoeuvered the British and Austrians into a trap, exposed to the French artillery from the other side of the Main. Louis was at the head of a blocking force of some 28,000 troops and was ordered to prevent an allied breakout. Instead he launched an all-out attack, which forced the French artillery to stop firing and with the attack spent and the French out of their defenses, the allies' counter-attack drove Gramont's force across and into the river, opening the road to Hanau and out of the trap. He was killed at the Battle of Fontenoy in 1745.

== Personal life ==
On 11 March 1720 Louis married Geneviève de Gontaut (1696–1756), daughter of Marshal of France Charles-Armand de Gontaut, duc de Biron (1663–1756), and had three children :

- Marie-Chrétienne-Christine de Gramont (1721–1790), married Yves Marie de Récourt de Licques, comte de Rupelmonde.
- Antoine VII de Gramont (1722–1801), no surviving male issue.
- Antoine-Adrien-Charles de Gramont (1726–1762)

== Sources ==
- Butler, Rohan d'Olier (1980). Choiseul. Vol. 1. Clarendon Press. ISBN 0-19-822509-1.
- Kybett, Susan Maclean (2021). Bonnie Prince Charlie: A Biography. Taylor & Francis. ISBN 9781000442298.
- Orr, Clarissa Campbell, ed. (2004). Queenship in Europe 1660-1815: The Role of the Consort. Cambridge University Press. ISBN 9780521814225.

French nobility
Preceded by Antoine VI	Duke of Gramont; 1741–1745	Succeeded by Antoine VII
