= Abeken =

Abeken is a surname. Notable people with the surname include:

- Bernhard Rudolf Abeken (1780–1866), German philologist and literature historian
- Heinrich Abeken (1809–1872), German theologian and Prussian diplomat
- Hermann Abeken (1820–1854), German political writer and statistician
- Wilhelm Ludwig Abeken (1813–1843), German archaeologist
