= Diplomatic cable =

Confidential diplomatic message exchanged between embassies or consulates

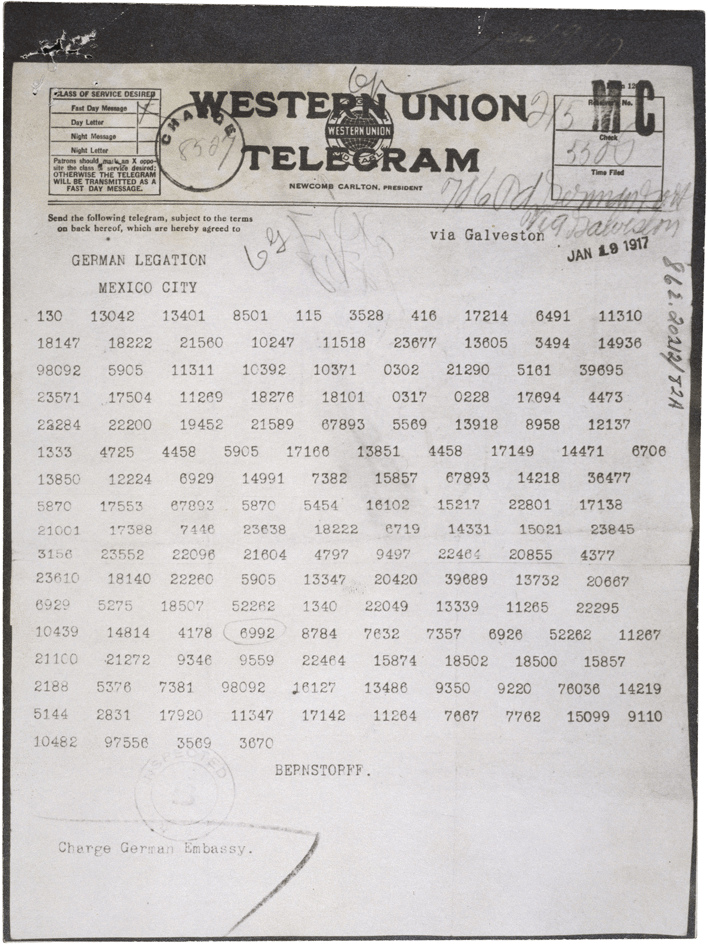
The Zimmermann telegram, a coded diplomatic cable sent on 16 January 1917, from the Foreign Secretary of the German Empire, Arthur Zimmermann, to the German ambassador in Mexico, Heinrich von Eckardt

A diplomatic cable, also known as a diplomatic telegram (DipTel) or embassy cable, is a confidential text-based message exchanged between a diplomatic mission, like an embassy or a consulate, and the foreign ministry of its parent country. A diplomatic cable is a type of dispatch. Other dispatches may be sent as physical documents in a diplomatic bag.

The term cable derives from the time when the medium for such communications was telegraphs travelling along international submarine communications cables, though over time they have progressed into other formats and pathways. The term cablegram is also sometimes used. Due to the importance and sensitive nature of the subject matter, diplomatic cables are protected by the most elaborate security precautions to prevent unfettered access by the public or unauthorized interception by foreign governments. Generally digital in format, they are always encrypted, frequently by unbreakable one time pad ciphers using key material distributed using diplomatic couriers.

== History ==
Samuel Morse sent the first official U.S. telegraph message from Washington to Baltimore on 24 May 1844. European foreign ministries initially used telegraphy in the early 1850s, but it didn't become an important tool of U.S. diplomacy until an effective transatlantic cable was completed. The first transatlantic message went out on 16 August 1858 but the cable failed after about three weeks. A long-lasting one was pulled on 27 July 1866 and the State Department set up its own telegraph office that same year.

On 23-24 November 1866, William Seward sent the department's first encrypted transatlantic cable, from Washington to Paris, demanding Napoleon III to withdraw French troops from Mexico.

A telegram from the Prussian king's retreat at Bad Ems to Bismarck reported a meeting with the French ambassador Vincent Benedetti. Before releasing the report to the newspapers, Bismarck edited it in a way that would provoke the French. France later declared war on 19 July 1870.

On 17 December 1895, President Cleveland delivered an address to Congress that many read as a threat of war with Britain if it refused to accept Venezuela's demands. Britain and Venezuela agreed in 1897 to submit the dispute to arbitration, and in October 1899 a tribunal in Paris fixed the boundary in October 1899, giving most of the disputed land to Britain.

Until the Cold War, telegrams traveled over commercial cable lines and were sent in code. Arthur Zimmermann sent his message to Mexico on 16 January 1917 and the British intercepted and decoded it the next day, in which they passed it to the U.S. State Department about a month later. It appeared in the American press on 1 March and then the U.S. declared war on Germany on 6 April.

== Examples ==
=== The Long Telegram ===
The Long Telegram was an 8,000 word cable sent on 22 February 1946 by George F. Kennan, then the chargé d'affaires at the U.S. embassy in Moscow, to the Secretary of State. It's considered the most famous cable in American diplomatic history. It analyzed Soviet motives and foreign policy, which then developed the United States policy of containment.

The State Department had asked George F. Kennan to explain why the Soviet Union opposed the new World Bank and International Monetary Fund. He wrote an essay analyzing the methods and ideologies of Soviet communism and discussing how the United States should respond. According to Princeton's account, both the State and Treasury departments asked Kennan about Stalin's perceived hostile behavior. Kennan's reply gave a general analysis of Soviet Policy and to propose how the U.S. might respond. Kennan used his reply to submit the first draft of what became the containment strategy. Later, he said that the way the policy was carried out had differed from what he intended.

In July 1947, "The Sources of Soviet Conduct" was published. Kennan's article appeared in the July 1947 Issue of Foreign Affairs, under a pseudonym "X". This is where the term "containment" had first appeared in public. It developed on the ideas in the Long Telegram. Arthur Krock quickly exposed Kennan as the author of the "X" article, yet he didn't acknowledge authorship until 1951.

=== The Novikov telegram ===
The Marshall Plan, an economic aid program that Novikov interpreted as part of a strategy of American expansion.

The Novikov telegram was an analysis of post-war U.S. foreign policy written by Nikolai Novikov, the Soviet ambassador to the United States. It was sent to Vyacheslav Molotov in 27 September 1946. Novikov wrote that U.S. foreign policy, "which reflects the imperialist tendencies of American monopolistic capital, is characterized in the postwar period by a striving for world supremacy". According to him, the military, industry, science and diplomacy were all working toward that goal. He also argued that American leaders expected their main rivals to be weakened or possibly crushed, which would leave the U.S. as the most powerful country. In addition, he claimed that the U.S. sought control over China, strengthened forces in Germany, was supported by Britain and tried to limit Soviet influence near USSR's borders.

=== The Ems Dispatch ===
The Ems Dispatch was a telegram from Heinrich Abeken, who was an aide to Prussia's King Wilhelm I, reported the king's encounter with the French ambassador Vincent Benedetti. Bismarck edited it before releasing it to the press, in which it was perceived as if the king and the ambassador had insulted each other. France declared war on 19 July 1870. Bismarck had denied adding to the text and said he only shortened it, although historians, such as Theodore S. Hamerow, Erich Eyck and A.J.P. Taylor read the editing as intentional to make war inevitable.

=== WikiLeaks "Cablegate" ===
Cablegate was the release of 251,287 U.S. diplomatic cables by WikiLeaks. They span from 1966 to 2010 and came from 274 embassies, consulates and missions all over the world. Publication began on 28 November 2010. The leaker was Chelsea Manning, a former U.S. Army intelligence analyst. Manning was convincted in 2013 on Espionage Act counts and was sentenced to 35 years. President Barack Obama mitigated the sentence and she was released on 17 May 2017.

Among all 251,287 cables, none were classified as top-secret, and only around 15,000 were classified as secret. Most were considered less sensitive.

Representative Peter King said WikiLeaks displayed a danger to U.S. national security and Franco Frattini—the former foreign minister of Italy—called the release the "September 11 of world diplomacy".

== Security ==
The State Department's first encoded transatlantic telegram in 1866, came with a warning from John Bigelow. He believed the department's existing code wasn't secret anymore and prompted a new cipher. Additionally, encoding made cables more expensive, since it multiplied the word count by five and the transmission cost by ten.

Systems can fail through misuse or cryptanalysis. Dutch codebreakers—such as Capitain Nyweide and Lieutenant Vis—broke four American diplomatic codes between June and December 1918. The Soviet's one-time-pad system was theoretically unbreakable, but reuse of some pages during World War II let U.S. analysts recover parts of their traffic. The Zimmermann Telegram was intercepted and decoded by the British intelligence on 17 January 1917.

Modern cables can be encrypted using cryptographic methods. The State Department's correspondence handbook defines "Encrypted For Transmission Only" (EFTO) as a classification used in "Sensitive But Unclassified, No Foreign" (SBU NOFORN) telegrams.

Diplomatic pouches, such as the Dikko affair remain inviolable under international law.

== See also ==
- Airgram
- Telegram
- United States diplomatic cables leak – Cablegate by WikiLeaks
