= Causes of the Franco-Prussian War =

Causes of 1870–1871 war

Map of the North German Confederation (red), the Southern German States (orange) and Alsace-Lorraine (tan).

The causes of the Franco-Prussian War are deeply rooted in the events surrounding German unification. In the aftermath of the Austro-Prussian War (1866), Prussia had annexed numerous ethnically German territories and formed the North German Confederation with other German territories. Prussia then turned its attention towards the south of Germany, where it sought to expand its influence.

France was strongly opposed to the annexation of the southern German states (Bavaria, Wurttemberg, Baden and Hesse-Darmstadt) by the North German Confederation, which would have created too powerful a country next to its border. In Prussia, a war against France was deemed necessary to arouse German nationalism in those states in order to allow the unification of most German states (excluding the ethnically German lands of the Austrian Empire) into a great German Empire. This aim was epitomized by Prussian Chancellor Otto von Bismarck's quote: "I knew that a Franco-Prussian War must take place before a united Germany was formed." Bismarck also knew that France should be the aggressor in the conflict to bring the Southern German States to side with Prussia, hence giving Germans numerical superiority.

The immediate cause of the war resided in the candidacy of a Prussian prince to the throne of Spain – France feared encirclement by an alliance between Prussia and Spain. The Hohenzollern prince's candidacy was withdrawn under French diplomatic pressure, but Otto von Bismarck goaded the French into declaring war by altering a dispatch sent by William I. Releasing the Ems Dispatch to the public, Bismarck made it sound as if the king had treated the French envoy in a demeaning fashion. Six days later, France declared war on Prussia and the Southern German States immediately sided with Prussia.

French Emperor Napoleon III and Prime Minister Émile Ollivier's eagerness to relieve France from internal political convulsions also contributed to France's declaration of war on Prussia.

In a book published in connection with a symposium held on the 150th anniversary of the Franco-Prussian War in 2020, Nicolas Bourguinat and Gilles Vogt, co-organisers of the symposium, point out that most French historians now cast into doubt the three-point official version regarding the causes of the war that has dominated French historiography for a long time: 1) that Bismark needed a war to bring Southern Germany behind Prussia in order to complete German unification; 2) that Bismarck lured France into a trap in connection with a candidacy to the Spanish throne; 3) that the French government, pressured by public opinion and convinced of its military superiority, fell head-on into the trap. The authors stress that with the benefit of hindsight it is now difficult to support the thesis that the Hohenzollern candidacy had been a ploy destined to draw France into an armed conflict. Regardless of what might have been Bismarck’s ulterior motives with respect to the Hohenzollern candidacy, Paris, intent on war, had decided early on to use that candidacy as a casus belli.

== European wars and the balance of power: 1865–1866 ==
In October 1865, Napoleon III, ruler of France, met with Prussian Prime Minister Otto von Bismarck in Biarritz, France. It was there that the two men struck a deal— France would not get involved in any future actions between Prussia and Austria or ally herself with Austria if Prussia somehow won the war and did not allow Italy to claim Venetia. When Austria and Prussia met in May 1866, Bismarck honored the agreement made in Biarritz the previous year and refused to allow Austria to have Venetia. Austria then attempted to guarantee Italy Venetia if they remained neutral, but the two nations were unable to agree on a suitable arrangement as an alliance formed earlier in the year bound Italy to Prussia. Napoleon III then committed a serious blunder by agreeing with Austria in a secret treaty to remain neutral in an Austrian-Prussian conflict in exchange for France acquiring Venetia plus the establishment of a neutral (i.e., French-leaning) state west of the Rhine; this violated the agreement Napoleon had made with Bismarck.

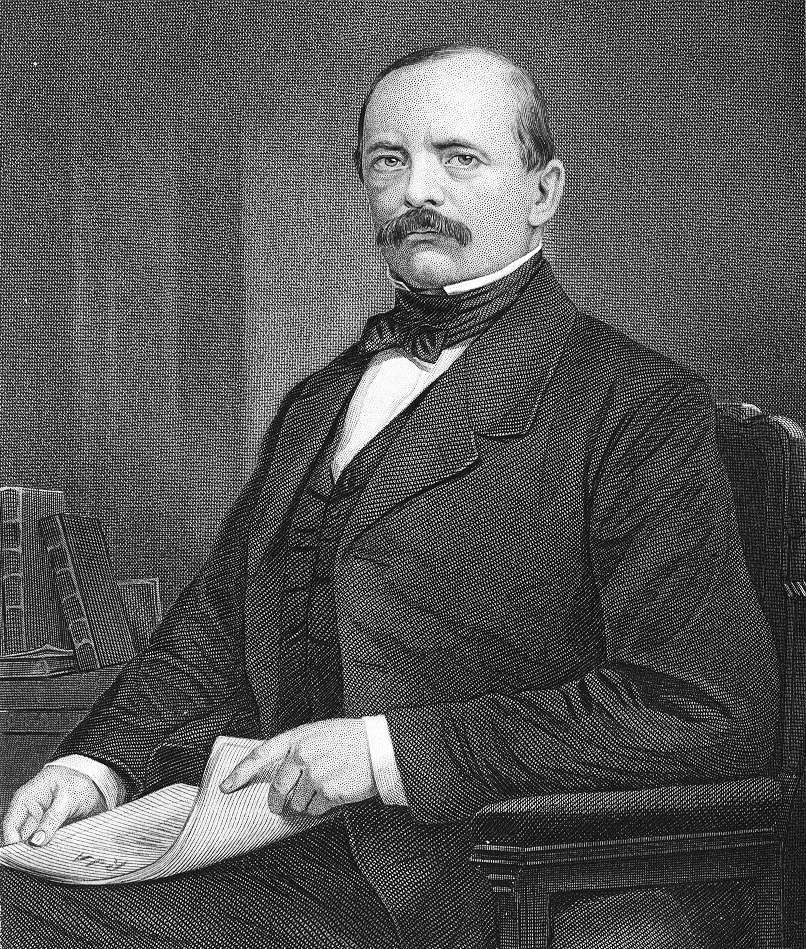
Otto von Bismarck, Chancellor of Prussia

After Prussia emerged victorious over the Austrian army at the Battle of Königgrätz (also known as Sadowa or Sadová) in the Austro-Prussian War of 1866, negotiations were being held between Austria and Prussia in July and August of that year. It was during that period that Napoleon III first discovered that a bladder stone was causing him great pains, created from gonorrheal infection. His condition was so bad during those negotiations that he was forced to retire to Vichy to recuperate, removing himself from Paris. Although the emperor favored neutrality as to not upset events, certain members of his circle thought it was an unwise move, considering the opportunity to prevent Prussia from becoming too strong. One of these men, foreign minister Édouard Drouyn de Lhuys, convinced the emperor to plant 80,000 men on the eastern border to convince Wilhelm I to maintain the balance of power in Europe. Despite this important victory, de Lhuys was subverted by several other ministers, and Napoleon III changed his mind, reverting to a position of neutrality. This change of heart would end up causing de Lhuys to ultimately lose his position. Napoleon III's wife Empress Eugénie, who took an active part throughout his rule, referred to this time much later as "the critical date, the Empire's fatal date; it was during these months of July and August that our fate was sealed! Of all that period, there is not a single fact, not a single detail that has not remained in my mind."

Franz Joseph of Austria accepted Bismarck's terms under the Peace of Prague. Using this to his advantage, Bismarck declared the German Confederation of 1815 null and void, and created a new network of states under Prussian control. Frankfurt-am-Main, Hannover, Hesse-Kassel (or Hesse-Cassel), Holstein, Nassau, and Schleswig were annexed outright while Hesse-Darmstadt, Mecklenburg, Saxony, the Thuringian duchies, as well as the cities of Bremen, Hamburg, and Lübeck were combined into a new North German Confederation that governed nominally and was actually controlled by Prussia herself.

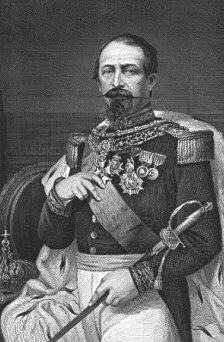
Napoleon III, Emperor of the French

Bismarck was approached soon after the end of the war by Napoleon III's ambassador to Prussia, Vincent Benedetti. Benedetti brought with him a secret proposal by Napoleon III that France would approve of Bismarck's acquisition of the northern German states if Prussia remained neutral while France annexed Belgium and Luxembourg. France had earlier guaranteed the independence of Belgium in the Treaty of London in 1839 as an "independent and perpetually neutral state", making the proposal a tacit agreement to break their promise. Bismarck was very surprised since he had already gained a powerful position in Europe by the armistice, and called Napoleon III's request among others later "like 'an innkeeper's bill' or a waiter asking for 'a tip'." He asked Benedetti to provide the proposal in writing, and the ambassador obliged his request. This document was to be important to Bismarck later on, to great effect.

The true views of Napoleon III on the subject of the balance of power in Europe can be found in a state circular handed to every diplomatic representative for France. In this paper dated September 1, 1866, the emperor saw the future of Europe after the Peace of Prague in this manner:

"Policy should rise superior to the narrow and mean prejudices of a former age. The Emperor does not believe that the greatness of a country depends upon the weakness of the nations which surround it, and he sees a true equilibrium only in the satisfied aspirations of the nations of Europe. In this, he is faithful to old convictions and to the traditions of his race. Napoleon I foresaw the changes which are now taking place on the continent of Europe. He had sown the seeds of new nationalities: in the Peninsula, when he created the Kingdom of Italy; and in Germany, when he abolished two hundred and fifty three separate states."

== Domestic agenda in France and Prussia ==
=== French prestige and politics ===
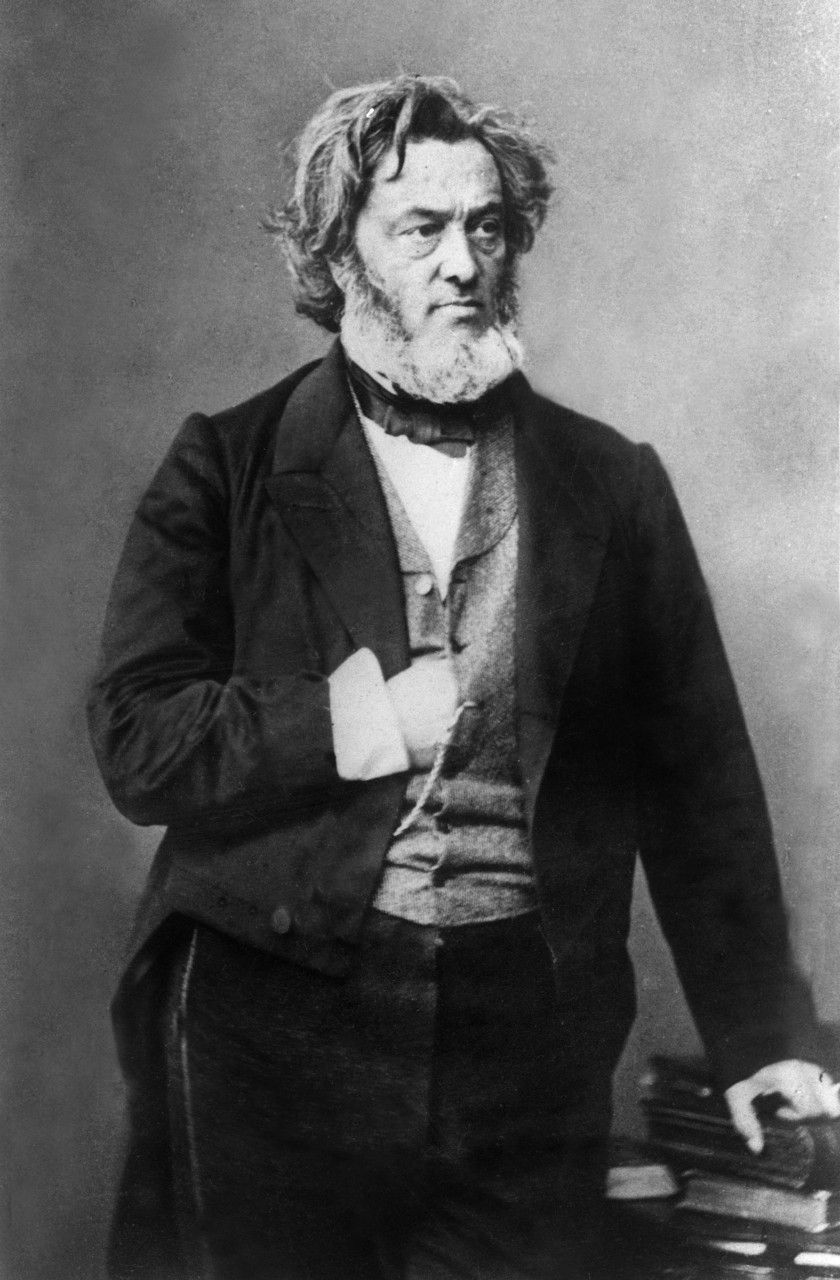
Jules Favre of the Second Republic in 1865

France's position in Europe was now in danger of being overshadowed by the emergence of a powerful Prussia, and France looked increasingly flat-footed following Bismarck's successes. In addition, French ruler Napoleon III was on increasingly shaky ground in domestic politics. Having successfully overthrown the Second Republic and established the Bonapartist Second Empire, Napoleon III was confronted with ever more virulent demands for democratic reform from leading republicans such as Jules Favre, along with constant rumours of impending revolution. In addition, French aspirations in Mexico had suffered a final defeat with the execution of the Austrian-born, French puppet Emperor Maximilian I of Mexico in 1867.

The French imperial government now looked to a diplomatic success to stifle demands for a return to either a republic or a Bourbon monarchy. A war with Prussia and resulting territorial gains in the Rhineland and later Luxembourg and Belgium seemed the best hope to unite the French nation behind the Bonapartist dynasty. With the resulting prestige from a successful war, Napoleon III could then safely suppress any lingering republican or revolutionary sentiment behind reactionary nationalism and return France to the center of European politics.

=== Bismarck and German nationalism ===
Prussia in turn was also beset with problems. While revolutionary fervour was far more muted than in France, Prussia had in 1866 acquired millions of new citizens as a result of the Austro-Prussian War, which was also a civil war among German states. The remaining German kingdoms and principalities maintained a steadfastly parochial attitude towards Prussia and German unification. The German princes insisted upon their independence and balked at any attempt to create a federal state that would be dominated by Berlin. Their suspicions were heightened by Prussia's quick victory and subsequent annexations. Before the war, only some Germans, inspired by the recent unification of Italy, accepted and supported what the princes began to realise, that Germany must unite in order to preserve the fruit of an eventual victory.

Bismarck had an entirely different view after the war in 1866: he was interested only in strengthening Prussia through the eyes of a staunch realist. Uniting Germany appeared immaterial to him unless it improved Prussia's position. Bismarck had mentioned before the war the possibility of ceding territory along the Rhine to France, and Napoleon III, urged by his representatives in France, used these casual references by Bismarck to press for more of the territory that Prussia had received from Austria. These discussions, leaked by Bismarck to the German states in the south, turned former enemies into allies almost overnight, receiving not only written guarantees but armies that would be under the control of Prussia.

== Alliances and diplomacy ==
=== German states ===
Diplomatically and militarily, Napoleon III looked for support from Austria, Denmark, Bavaria, Baden, and Württemberg, as all had recently lost wars against Prussia. However, Napoleon III failed to secure revanchist alliances from these states. Denmark had twice fought Prussia during the First and Second Wars of Schleswig (a victory in the 1848–50, and a defeat in 1864 against a confederation of North German states and Austria under the leadership of Prussia), and was unwilling to confront Prussia again. As part of the settlement of the Austro-Prussian War in 1866, secret treaties of mutual defense were signed between Prussia and Bavaria, Baden, and Württemberg. What made them especially significant was that not only were they secret, giving Napoleon III a false sense of security, but Bismarck had used Napoleon III's earlier demand of territory along the Rhine to drive the southern German states into his arms. By these treaties, Prussia would defend all of the southern German states with its military power as long as their states joined the Northern Confederation in defense of Prussia. It was a bargain that would gravely threaten the French empereur and his designs on restoring French pride.

=== Austria and Italy ===
The Austrian Chancellor Friedrich Ferdinand von Beust was "impatient to take his revenge on Bismarck for Sadowa." As a preliminary step, the Ausgleich with Hungary was "rapidly concluded." Beust "persuaded Francis Joseph to accept Magyar demands which he had till then rejected.". However, Austria would not support France unless Italy was part of the alliance. Victor Emmanuel II and the Italian government wanted to support France, but Italian public opinion was bitterly opposed so long as Napoleon III kept a French garrison in Rome protecting Pope Pius IX, thereby denying Italy the possession of its capital (Rome had been declared capital of Italy in March 1861, when the first Italian Parliament had met in Turin). Napoleon III made various proposals for resolving the Roman Question, but Pius IX rejected them all. Despite his previous support for Italian unification, Napoleon did not wish to press the issue for fear of angering Catholics in France. Raffaele De Cesare, an Italian journalist, political scientist, and author, noted that:

The alliance, proposed two years before 1870, between France, Italy, and Austria, was never concluded because Napoleon III [...] would never consent to the occupation of Rome by Italy. [...] He wished Austria to avenge Sadowa, either by taking part in a military action, or by preventing South Germany from making common cause with Prussia. [...] If he could insure, through Austrian aid, the neutrality of the South German States in a war against Prussia, he considered himself sure of defeating the Prussian army, and thus would remain arbiter of the European situation. But when the war suddenly broke out, before anything was concluded, the first unexpected French defeats overthrew all previsions, and raised difficulties for Austria and Italy which prevented them from making common cause with France. Wörth and Sedan followed each other too closely. The Roman question was the stone tied to Napoleon's feet — that dragged him into the abyss. He never forgot, even in August 1870, a month before Sedan, that he was a sovereign of a Catholic country, that he had been made Emperor, and was supported by the votes of the conservatives and the influence of the clergy; and that it was his supreme duty not to abandon the Pontiff. [...] For twenty years Napoleon III had been the true sovereign of Rome, where he had many friends and relations [...] Without him the temporal power would never have been reconstituted, nor, being reconstituted, would have endured.

Another reason why Beust's desired revanche against Prussia did not materialize was that, in 1870, the Hungarian Prime Minister Gyula Andrássy was "vigorously opposed."

=== Russia ===
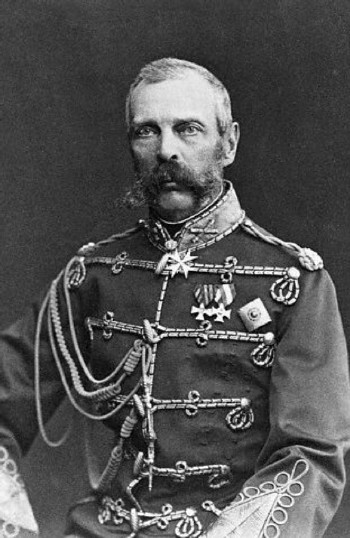
Tsar Alexander II of Russia

In addition to the problems facing Napoleon III in obtaining potential allies, Bismarck worked feverishly to isolate France from the other European powers. Since 1863, Bismarck had made efforts to cultivate Russia, co-operating, amongst other things, in dealing with Polish insurgents. This important move gained for Bismarck the neutrality of Russia if Prussia went to war, and it also prevented Austria from taking sides with France as Austria fully supported the Poles. When Alexander II came to France on an official visit in 1867, he was at the receiving end of an unsuccessful assassination attempt by Polish-born Anton Berezovski while riding with Napoleon III and the Empress Eugenie. Tsar Alexander was very offended that not only the French courts had given Berezovski imprisonment instead of death but also the French press had sided with the Pole rather than Alexander. This experience forever shattered his views of France and saw in the reaction his visit had received why his father had despised the French.

In 1868, he held discussions with the Prussians, intending to counter a possible Austrian alliance with Napoleon III by Franz Joseph. If German forces were, for any reason, bogged down in the west, then Prussia's eastern and southern flanks would have been highly vulnerable. With his usual skill, Bismarck moved carefully to sidestep the nightmare. The Russian government even went so far as to promise to send an army of 100,000 men against the Austrians if Austria joined France in a war against Prussia. Whilst at Ems in the crucial summer of 1870 Wilhelm I and Bismarck had meetings with Tsar Alexander, also present in the spa town Alexander, though not naturally pro-German, became very comfortable with Prussian suggestions.

Bismarck also had talks at Ems with Alexander Gorchakov, the Russian Foreign Minister, and was assured in mid-July, days before the French declaration of war, that the agreement of 1868 still held: in the event of Austrian mobilisation, the Russians confirmed that they would send 300,000 troops into Galicia. Bismarck now had all he wanted: a counter to Austria and the assurance of a one-front war.

=== United Kingdom ===
Bismarck then made Benedetti's earlier draft public to The Times in London that demanded Belgium and Luxembourg as the price for remaining neutral during the Austro-Prussian War. Sensitive to the threat of a major power controlling the strategically significant Low Countries and the English Channel coastline, the United Kingdom government in particular took a decidedly cool attitude to these French demands, and the British people were disturbed by this subversive attempt at going back on Napoleon III's word. Therefore, Britain as a nation did nothing to aid France. The Prime Minister, William Gladstone, expressed his thoughts on the matter to Queen Victoria by writing to her that "Your majesty will, in common with the world, have been shocked and startled." Though it had enjoyed some time as the leading power of continental Europe, the French Empire found itself dangerously isolated.

== Monarchial crises ==
=== Luxembourg Crisis ===
Map showing the location of Luxembourg within modern Europe

The king of the Netherlands, William III, was under a personal union with Luxembourg that guaranteed its sovereignty. Napoleon III had taken note that the king had amassed certain personal debts that would make a sale of Luxembourg to France possible. However, Luxembourg lies astride one of the principal invasion routes an army would use to invade either France or Germany from the other. The city of Luxembourg's fortifications were considered "the Gibraltar of the North" and neither side could tolerate the other controlling such a strategic location.

The pressure on Bismarck to object not only came from his monarch William I, but from Chief of Staff of the Prussian army Helmuth von Moltke. Moltke had additional reason to object: he desired war with France, stating flatly, "Nothing could be more welcome to us than to have now the war that we must have." Bismarck balked at such talk about war. He refused to actually engage France on the basis that he firmly believed that Prussia would gain a far more decisive advantage by merely opposing the sale and that Napoleon III could be thwarted due to his fear of war with Prussia.

Assuming that Bismarck would not object, the French government was shocked to learn that instead Bismarck, Prussia and the North German Confederation were threatening war should the sale be completed. Napoleon III had let precious months peel away in trying to complete the transaction, allowing Bismarck time to rally support to Prussia's objection. To mediate the dispute, the United Kingdom hosted the London Conference (1867) attended by all European great powers. It confirmed Luxembourg's independence from the Netherlands and guaranteed its independence from all other powers. War appeared to have been averted, at the cost of thwarting French desires.

=== Spanish throne ===
The Spanish throne had been vacant since the revolution of September 1868, and the Spanish offered the throne to the German prince Leopold of Hohenzollern-Sigmaringen, a Catholic as well as a distant cousin of King Wilhelm of Prussia. Leopold and Wilhelm I were both uninterested, but the wily Bismarck was acutely interested, as it was an opportunity to once again best Napoleon III. Bismarck persuaded Leopold's father to accept the offer for his nation, and it was accepted instead by Leopold himself in June 1870.

=== The Hohenzollern crisis and the Ems Dispatch ===
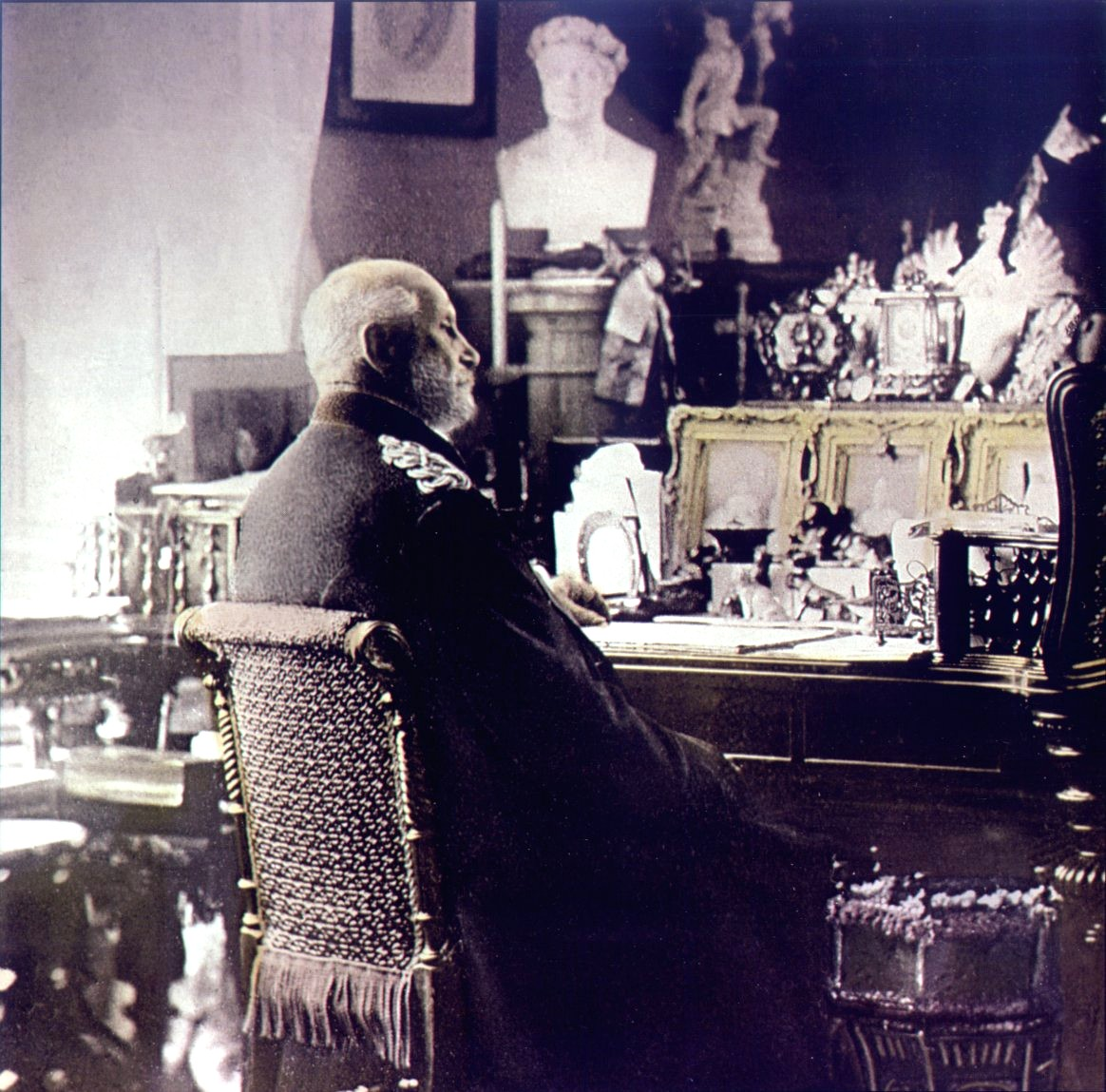
Wilhelm I of Germany at his desk

On 2 July 1870, "Marshall Prim [who held power in Spain] announced in Madrid that the Spanish government had offered the crown of Spain to Prince Leopold of Hohenzollern." Fearing that a Hohenzollern king in Prussia and another one in Spain would put France into a two-front situation, France this time was determined to stand up to the expansion of Prussian influence. Napoleon III at this time was suffering the most unbearable pain from his kidney stones, and the Empress Eugénie was essentially charged with countering the designs of Prussia. She had a vital interest in the crisis as she was of Spanish blood and a member of the royal line. The secretary of foreign affairs, Duc Antoine de Gramont, was directed by the Empress to be the principal instrument by which France would press for war should Leopold ascend the throne. Gramont delivered a speech in front of the Chambre législative, proclaiming that "We shall know how to fulfill our duty without hesitation and without weakness." The fatal mistake would soon come as a result of Gramont's inexperience, for he counted on alliances that only existed in his mind.

On 13 July 1870, thus on the eve of the French national holiday Bastille Day, King Wilhelm I of Prussia, who was on vacation in the spa town of Ems, was stopped by Count Vincent Benedetti, the French ambassador to Prussia since 1864. Benedetti had been instructed by Gramont to present the French demand that the king should guarantee that he would never again permit the candidacy of a Hohenzollern prince to the Spanish throne. Following this direct confrontation, which had bypassed diplomatic protocols, King Wilhelm informed his secretary H. Abeken who sent a lengthy telegraph message to Berlin reporting this event with the French ambassador. Bismarck shortened the internal memo into a press release which was perceived "like a red tag to the bull" for the French government. The dispatch was edited as follows (with only the words set in bold published):

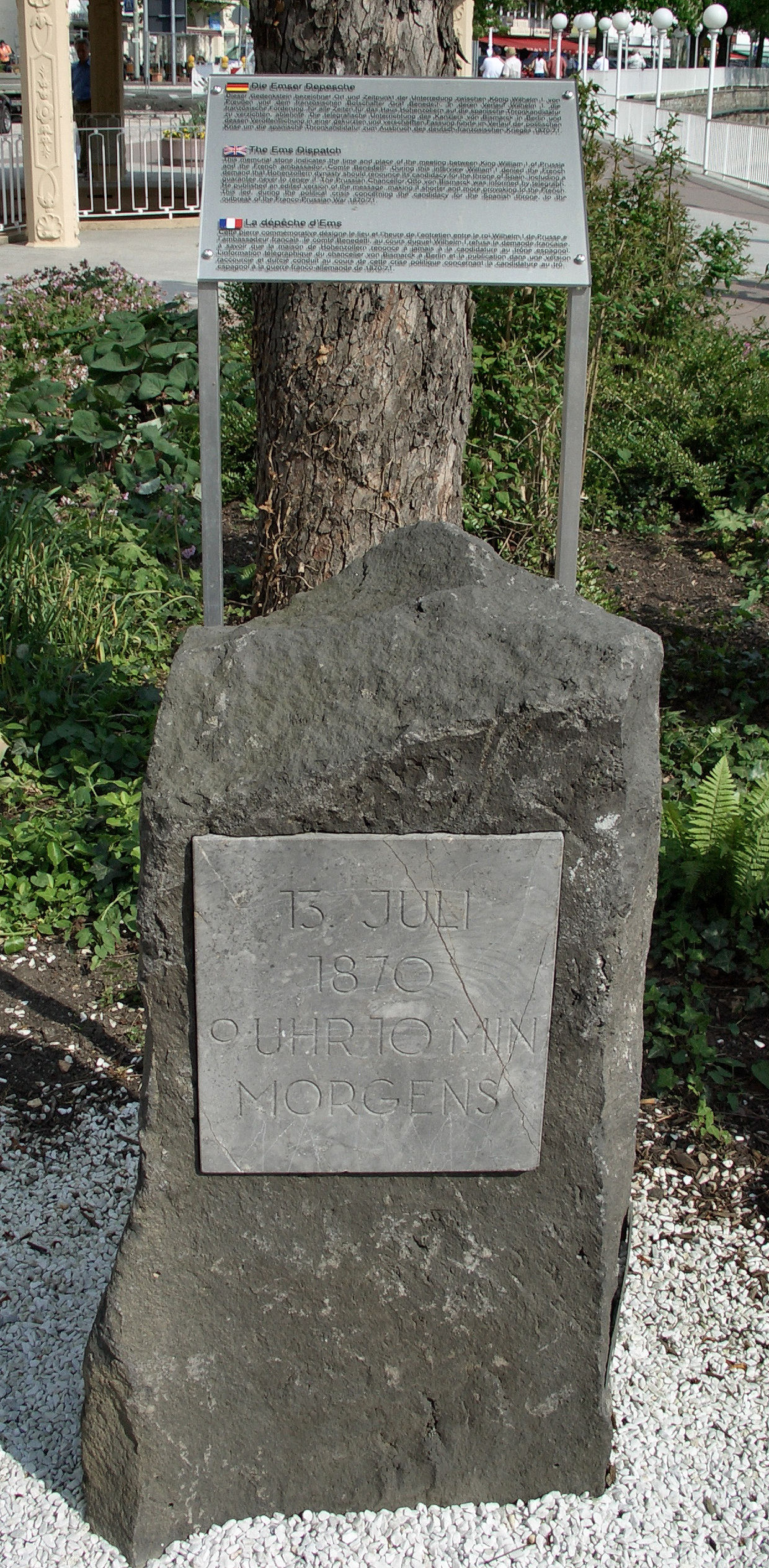
Memorial stone to the Ems Dispatch in Bad Ems

Count Benedetti spoke to me on the promenade, in order to demand from me, finally in a very importunate manner, that I should authorize him to telegraph at once that I bound myself for all future time never again to give my consent if the Hohenzollerns should renew their candidature. I refused at last somewhat sternly, as it is neither right nor possible to undertake engagements of this kind à tout jamais. Naturally I told him that I had as yet received no news, and as he was earlier informed about Paris and Madrid than myself, he could clearly see that my government once more had no hand in the matter. His Majesty has since received a letter from the Prince. His Majesty having told Count Benedetti that he was awaiting news from the Prince, has decided with reference to the above demand, upon the representation of Count Eulenburg and myself, not to receive Count Benedetti again, but only to let him be informed through an aide-de-camp that his Majesty had now received from the Prince confirmation of the news which Benedetti had already received from Paris, and had nothing further to say to the ambassador. His Majesty leaves it to your Excellency whether Benedetti's fresh demand and its rejection should not be at once communicated both to our ambassadors and to the press.

This dispatch made the encounter more heated than it really was. Known as the Ems Dispatch, it was released to the press in the evening of July 13, in time to be printed in the French national holiday issue newspapers, translated by Havas to French with additional liberties or false friend errors, especially the German Adjutant who was a high rank aide-de-camp, not a low rank adjutant. It gave the French the impression that King Wilhelm I had insulted the French Count Benedetti, and the Prussian people the impression that the Count had insulted the King. It succeeded in both of its aims- Gramont called it "a blow in the face of France", and the members of the French legislative body spoke of taking "immediate steps to safeguard the interests, the security, and the honor of France."

Ambassador Benedetti had telegraphed to Paris, but his view was not given to the international press. He arrived in Paris on the 15th, when the public opinion was already formed and French forces were mobilized.

On 19 July 1870 "Le Sourd, the French Chargé d'Affaires, delivered Napoleon's declaration of war at the Foreign Office" in Berlin. According to the secret treaties signed with Prussia, and in response to popular opinion, Bavaria (which at the time had a border with France), Baden, and Württemberg mobilised their armies and joined the war against France.

=== European public reaction ===
At the outbreak of the war, European public opinion heavily favored the Germans. For example, many Italians attempted to sign up as volunteers at the Prussian embassy in Florence, and a Prussian diplomat visited Giuseppe Garibaldi in Caprera. After the fall of Napoleon III following the Battle of Sedan, Bismarck's demand for the return of Alsace caused a dramatic shift in that sentiment, which was best exemplified by the reaction of Garibaldi soon after the revolution in Paris, who told the Movimento of Genoa on 7 September 1870, "Yesterday I said to you: war to the death to Bonaparte. Today I say to you: rescue the French Republic by every means."

== See also ==
- French–German enmity
