= Guillaume Schnaebelé =

French police officer (1831–1900)

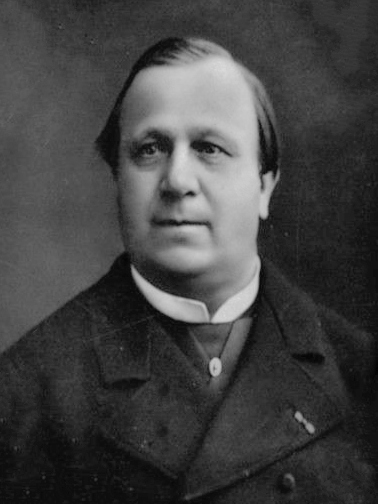
Guillaume Schnaebelé

Guillaume Schnaebelé or Wilhelm Schnäbele (1831 – 5 December 1900) was a French official from Alsace, best known for being arrested by Germans in the April 1887 Schnaebele incident (or Affair) which nearly led to war between France and Germany.

Who caused the incident and why remains speculative, but it has been suggested that German Chancellor Otto von Bismarck was its instigator, for a number of possible reasons: inciting France into starting a war, gauging the extent of French support for Boulangism, or creating tensions with France to force the renewal of a Russian-German alliance of neutrality that was under debate at the Russian court.

Others see it as simply a series of unintended consequences, notable for the role played by France's General Georges Ernest Boulanger. This and a number of other incidents involving General Boulanger are elements of what is known as the Boulanger Affair, a series of embarrassments for the newly formed government of the French Third Republic that some consider to have nearly led to a coup d'état.

== Biography ==
Guillaume Schnaebelé or Wilhelm Schnäbele was an Alsatian born in 1831 in Eckbolsheim, near Strasbourg. After the Franco-Prussian War and Germany's subsequent annexation of Alsace in 1871, he emigrated to France, probably altering the spelling of his name accordingly. He had served in the war and was appointed Knight of the Legion of Honor. After the incident of 1887 he was moved to a post at Laon. He died on 5 December 1900 in Nancy, France.

== Schnaebele Affair ==
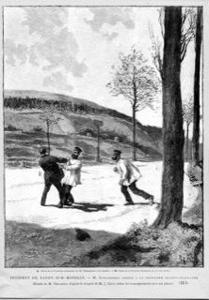
Illustration: Schnaebelé being grabbed at the border by two German secret policemen in disguise.

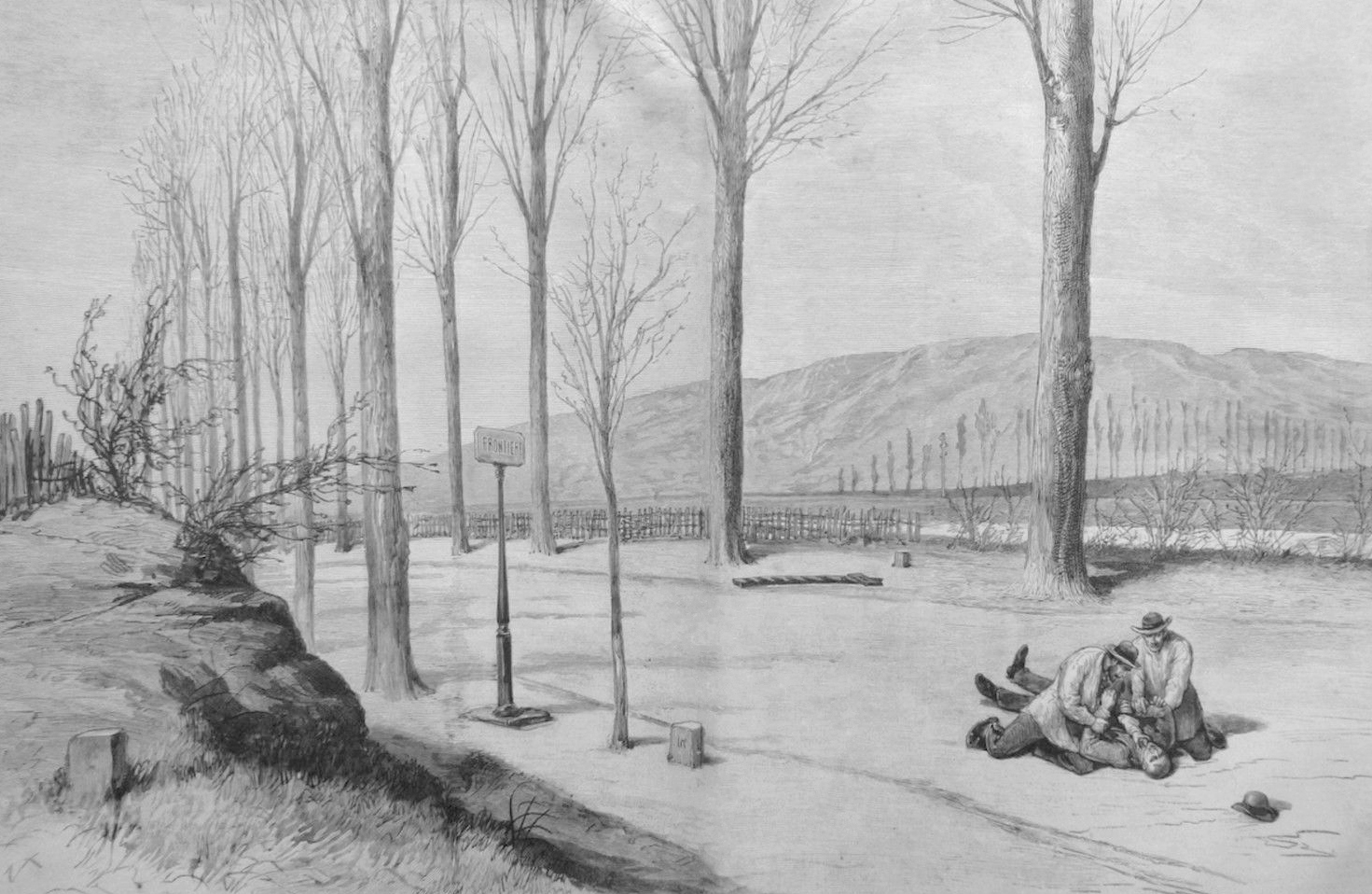
Illustration: Schnaebelé is dragged by his assailants to the German side of the border. Note the three border stones and two poles, marking where the road crosses the French and German "Frontière" (sign). The railroad embankment to the left.

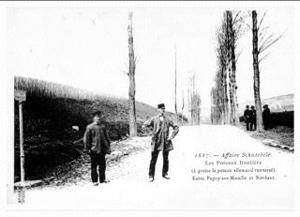
Photograph taken soon after, standing on the road with backs to the railway embankment

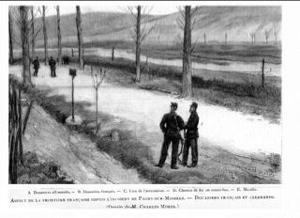
Illustration: After the incident, French customs officials looking at German officials across the border.

On 21 April 1887 the French Havas news agency published a dispatch to the effect that Schnaebelé, a mid-level and obscure French police inspector, had been arrested by two agents of the German secret police on the Franco-German frontier near Pagny-sur-Moselle as he was on his way to Ars an der Mosel (now Ars-sur-Moselle) for a meeting with the German police inspector there, at the latter's request. A dispute followed as to whether the arrest had taken place on French or German territory (see "Account of incident" below); but regardless, the French claimed that under the circumstances Schnaebelé was entitled to immunity even if on German territory since he had been invited to a conference by German officials. The reason given by the German authorities for the arrest was that in a previous inquiry into charges of treasonable practices against a number of Alsatians, evidence had been produced that Schnaebelé had been involved in transmitting to Paris information as to German fortresses, furnished by Alsatians in the pay of the French Government, and that an order had been issued to arrest him if ever he should be found on German soil. In other words, the Germans believed Schnaebelé to be a spy.

Within a week of his arrest, on 28 April, Schnaebelé was released by order of the German Emperor, William I. In a dispatch of the same date to the French ambassador at Berlin, Bismarck explained that, although the German Government considered, in view of the proofs of guilt, the arrest to be fully justified, it was deemed expedient to release Schnaebelé on the ground that business meetings between frontier officials "must always be regarded as protected by a mutually-assured safe conduct." Thus ended the Schnaebelé incident.

The week-long incident, between 21 and 28 April, generated such threatening and provocative language from both sides as to cause serious concern of war. A large section of the German press demanded that Germany make no concession. In France, the Cabinet voted 6 to 5 against an ultimatum demanding the release of Schnaebelé with an apology, which would almost certainly have meant war, as had happened with the Ems Dispatch in 1870. The proposed ultimatum had been put forward by French war hawk and Minister of War Georges Ernest Boulanger, who also brought in a bill to mobilise an army corps.

After Schnaebelé's release and Bismarck's letter, many in the French public thought Bismarck backed down because he was afraid of Boulanger, which increased Boulanger's rising star as a national hero and bolstered his image as a "Revenger" for France against Germany. However, he was, in truth, an embarrassment to the Republican government, who knew well that the French army was no better off than in 1870, when Germany quickly defeated it in the Franco-Prussian War. Boulanger's antagonism against Germany during the week-long crisis was indeed a danger to the Republic. For this and other reasons, on 7 July 1887 Boulanger was released as Minister of War and dispatched by the government to a provincial post to be hopefully forgotten, but not before admiring throngs tried to stop his train from leaving Paris: loyal to his military orders, he was smuggled out in a switch engine.

=== Cause ===
The reasons for the arrest and release of Schnaebelé have never been entirely explained, but there are theories, both contemporary and modern.

Contemporary theorists include Elie de Cyon, who asserted that Bismarck brought about the incident intentionally (for reasons explained below); that Czar Alexander III, made apprehensive for the peace of Europe, wrote an autographic letter to William I in regard to the matter, and that the Kaiser, going over the head of his chancellor Bismarck, ordered the release of Schnaebelé. Several French politicians at the time suspected the incident of being a calculated experiment by Bismarck to gauge the depth of the anti-German feeling in France, a means of testing, by an incident, which could be closed at any time by a mere apology, without any shock to German national dignity, whether Boulanger had a sufficient following in public opinion to make Boulangism a real danger to peace. In Germany, the incident occurred during a time when Bismarck was trying to force a new and very expensive military law through the Reichstag, and it has occasionally been speculated that it was necessary to inflame the menace of war to justify these new taxes. However, the Army Bill was passed on 11 March, three weeks before Schnaebelé crossed the border.

Bismarck might have been trying to agitate conflict with France before Germany's treaty of neutrality with Russia expired that year (signed in 1881 and renewed in 1884) – Germany knew from experience that it could not afford a war with France without a neutral or allied Russia. Russia would only remain neutral if the responsibility for war was cast on the French, as happened in 1870. When the French government stood its ground and presented an irrefutable case, failing to throw the responsibility on the French, Bismarck knew, from previous experience, that he could not count on Russia's neutrality if conflict came, and he had to back down: Schnaebelé was therefore set free. Related to the Russians, Bismarck may have wanted to create a strained situation with France, to counteract the Panslavist party in Russia, which, at the time, was lobbying the cabinet of the Russian Emperor not to renew the Russian-German alliance.

Modern (1989) research suggests a simpler explanation. Schnaebelé was, in fact, engaged in espionage, working under the express request of Boulanger. However, Schnaebelé had been invited onto German territory by his German counterpart, which was a guarantee of safe-conduct, and thus his arrest, whilst on German territory, was legally irregular, which is why Bismarck agreed to his release. Bismarck had backed down, exclusively, because of the circumstances surrounding the arrest.

=== Account ===
According to one account, the incident occurred as follows: It was a cool day and Schnaebelé was wearing a coat and top hat. He walked briskly on the road leading from Nancy (France) to Metz (then in Lothringen, German Empire). The road is deserted. To his left are two French brothers working in a vineyard. To his right are a number of German railroad workers out of sight, but within earshot. Gautsch, his German colleague of Ars an der Mosel who he is supposed to meet, is not in sight. Schnaebelé wonders if Gautsch has reneged on the meeting. Schnaebelé is waiting impatiently, a few steps from the German side. Suddenly, a man in a gray blouse appears from the German side, hails Schnaebelé, then rushes at him, trying to lead him into Germany. Schnaebelé successfully resists but then a second man in a gray blouse appears. Returning a few steps into French territory, Schnaebelé exclaims (in German): "What do you want from me? I'm Guillaume Schnaebele Commissioner Special Pagny. I am here at home! This is the border." His two attackers do not listen and continue to grapple him across the border. The two French farmers do not intervene, but the six German rail workers on hearing the cries for help come into view. But what they see deters action: the two assailants remove their blouses and are shown to be wearing uniforms of the German police. Everything is then perfectly clear. They handcuff Schnaebelé by the wrist and lead him on foot to the village of Novéant and then by train to Metz. There he is thrown into prison and held incommunicado.

== Legacy ==
In 2005, as part of the arrival of the TGV to Pagny-sur-Moselle, a bridge was named for Schnaebelé.

== See also ==
- Ems Dispatch
- Venlo Incident
- Eston Kohver
