= Ida, Countess von Hahn-Hahn =

German author (1805–1880)

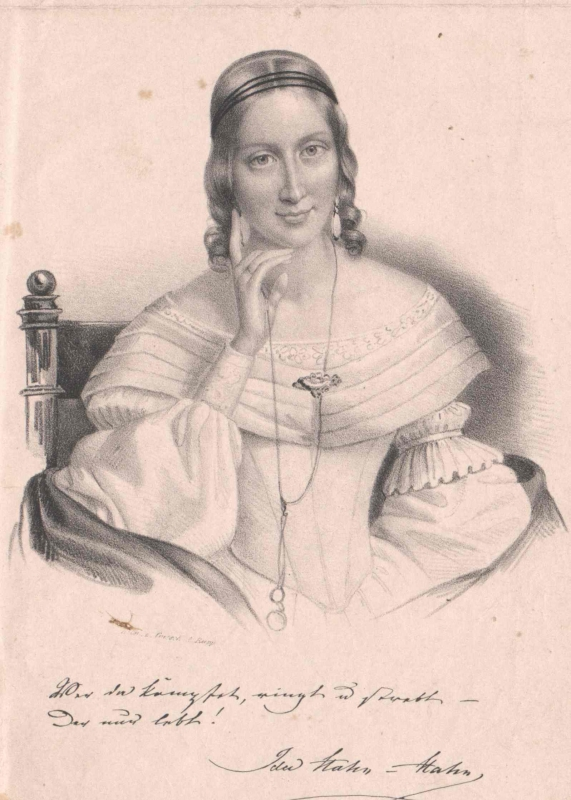
- Born: 22 June 1805; Tressow
- Died: 12 January 1880 (aged 74); Mainz
- Occupation: Writer
- Writing career
- Language: German language

Countess Ida von Hahn-Hahn (German: Ida Gräfin von Hahn-Hahn; 22 June 1805 – 12 January 1880) was a German author from a wealthy family who lost their fortune because of her father's eccentric spending. She defied convention by living with Adolf von Bystram unmarried for 21 years. Her writings about the German aristocracy were greatly favored by the general public of her time. Ida von Hahn-Hahn often wrote about the tragedies of the soul and was influenced by the French novelist George Sand. She "was an indefatigable campaigner for the emancipation of women" and her writings include many strong female characters.

== Biography ==
She was born at Tressow, in the duchy of Mecklenburg-Schwerin. She was the daughter of Count Karl von Hahn (1782 – 21 May 1857 Altona) of the von Hahn family, who was well known for his enthusiasm for stage productions, upon which he squandered a large portion of his fortune. In his old age, he was obliged to support himself by managing a provincial company and died in poverty.

In 1826, Ida married her wealthy cousin Friedrich Wilhelm Adolph Graf von Hahn, which gave her the doubled name. With him she had an extremely unhappy life, and in 1829 her husband's irregularities led to a divorce. She spent the years after her divorce ignoring social norms by traveling and living with Baron Adolf von Bystram. Bystram encouraged her to write about their travels across Europe and the Near East.

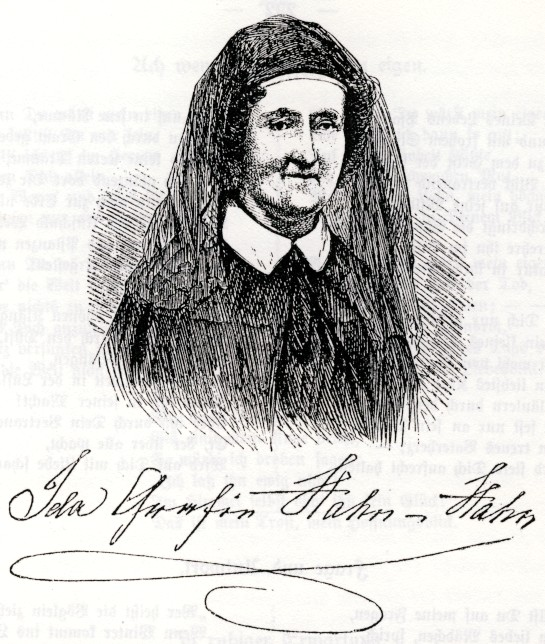
Ida, Countess von Hahn-Hahn

In 1847, the author drew upon herself the merciless ridicule of Fanny Lewald, who "attacked her as a self-indulgent aristocrat indifferent to the plight of the poor." After the revolutions of 1848 and the death of Adolf von Bystram in 1849, she embraced the Roman Catholic religion in 1850, after having opened the Bible on some day in 1849 and seeing this passage: "Arise, be enlightened O Jerusalem, for thy light is come, and the glory of the Lord is risen upon there." The countess Ida even visited the Prince Bishop Diepenbrock, of whom she asked whether or not she could be absorbed into the Catholic Church. Hahn-Hahn justified her step in a polemical work entitled Von Babylon nach Jerusalem (1851), which elicited a vigorous reply from Heinrich Abeken, and from several others as well.

In November 1852, she retired into the convent Du Bon Pasteur at Angers, which she however soon left, taking up residence in Mainz as a "layperson in a convent she had co-founded for "fallen" girls." She would die there (at Mainz) in 1880. Hahn-Hahn devoted herself to the reformation of outcasts of her own sex, and wrote several works, among which are: Bilder aus der Geschichte der Kirche (3 vols., 1856–'64); Peregrina (1864); and Eudoxia (1868).

== Writings ==
For many years, her novels were the most popular works of fiction in aristocratic circles; many of her later publications, however, passed unnoticed as mere religious manifestoes. Ulrich and Gräfin Faustine, both published in 1841, mark the culmination of her power; but Sigismund Forster (1843), Cecil (1844), Sibylle (1846) and Maria Regina (1860) also obtained considerable popularity. For several years, the countess continued to produce novels bearing a certain subjective resemblance to those of George Sand, but less hostile to social institutions, and dealing almost exclusively with aristocratic society.

Her collected works, Gesammelte Werke, with an introduction by Otto von Schaching, were published in two series, 45 volumes in all (Regensburg, 1903–1904).

=== Gräfin Faustine ===
Gräfin Faustine or Countess Faustine travels to the Orient and ends up in "a cloister to expiate her sins". Countess Faustine is a female Don Joan set in a world of adultery.

=== Catholic writings ===
After converting to Roman Catholicism, Hahn-Hahn began writing to encourage conversions to the Catholic Church.

== Publications ==
Countess von Hahn-Hahn's published works as cited by An Encyclopedia of Continental Women Writers. All publications listed below are in German.

- Gedichte [Poems]. Leipzig: F.A. Brockhaus. 1835. OCLC 830964717.
- Neue Gedichte [New Poems]. Leipzig: F.A. Brockhaus. 1836. OCLC 798547950.
- Lieder und gedichte [Songs and Poems]. Berlin: E.S. Mittler. 1837. OCLC 719396206.
- Aus der Gesellschaft [From the Realm of Society]. Berlin: Duncker und Humblot. 1838. OCLC 797992748.
- Gräfin Faustine [Countess Faustine]. Berlin: A. Duncker. 1841. OCLC 609507620. (reprinted as Gräfin Faustine. Berlin: ContumaxHofenberg. 2015. ISBN 9783843047944. OCLC 965667777.)
- Ulrich. Berlin: Alexander Duncker. 1841. OCLC 609507610.
- Cecil. Berlin: A. Duncker. 1844. OCLC 618805297.
- Ilda Schönholm. Berlin: A. Duncker. 1845. OCLC 956664438.
- Hahn-Hahn, Ida Gräfin von (1846). "Sibylle". Prose Nonfiction. Berlin: Duncker. OCLC 251462570. (reprinted as Sibylle. Altenmünster: Jazzybee Verlag. 2012. ISBN 9783849626914. OCLC 863904223.)
- Hahn-Hahn, Ida Gräfin von (1851). "Von Babylon nach Jerusalem; Aus Jerusalem" [From Babylon to Jerusalem]. Prose Fiction. Arnheim: J. Witz. OCLC 867632676. (reprinted as Hahn, Ida (2015). Von Babylon nach Jerusalem. Berlin: ContumaxHofenberg. ISBN 9783843095587. OCLC 968230511.)
- Gesammelte Schriften [Collected Works]. Berlin: Verlag von Alexander Duncker. 1851. OCLC 60461235. Her Protestant works in 21 volumes.
- Die Liebhaber des Kreuzes [The Lover of the Cross]. Arnheim: Witz. 1852. OCLC 913875457.
- Hahn-Hahn, Ida Gräfin von (1860). Maria Regina [Queen Mary]. Mainz: Kirchheim. ISBN 3628396859. OCLC 265435995. ; (reprinted as Maria Regina. Altenmünster: Jazzybee Verlag. 2012. ISBN 9783849626891. OCLC 863904242.)
- Peregrin. Mainz: Kirchheim. 1864. OCLC 1070998044. (reprinted as Peregrin. Berlin: ContumaxHofenberg. 2015. ISBN 9783843095563. OCLC 965701014.)
- Die Glöcknerstochter [The Bell-ringer's Daughters]. Mainz: F. Kirchheim. 1871. OCLC 6179803.
- Vergib uns unsere Schuld [Forgive Us Our Trespasses]. Mainz: Fr. Kirchheim. 1874. hdl:2027/njp.32101066417153. OCLC 706865101.
- Wahl und Führung [Choice and Leading]. Mainz: Verlag von F. Kirchheim. 1878. OCLC 830983824.
- Gesammelte Werke [Collected Works]. Regensburg: Habbel. 1903. OCLC 73105349. Her Catholic works in 45 volumes.
