= Vincent, Count Benedetti =

French diplomat (1817–1900)

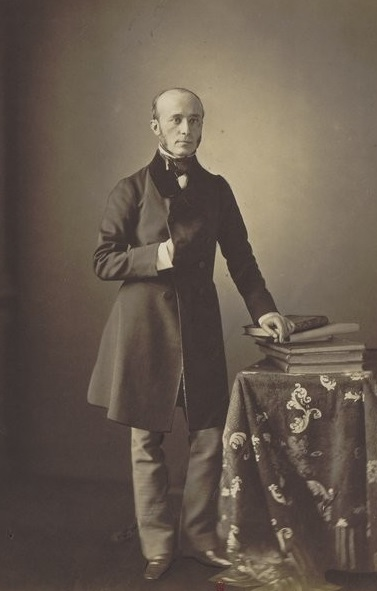
- Portrait in 1856

French Ambassador to Prussia
- In office 1864–1870

Personal details
- Born: Vincent Benedetti; 29 April 1817 Bastia, Corsica, France
- Died: 28 March 1900 (aged 82) Paris, France

Vincent, Count Benedetti (29 April 1817 – 28 March 1900) was a French diplomat. He is probably best known as one of the central figures in the instigation of the Franco-Prussian War through his role in the Ems Dispatch.

== Life and career ==
Benedetti was born to a family of Greek origin at Bastia, on the island of Corsica. In 1840, he entered the service of the French foreign office and was appointed to a post under the Marquis de la Valette, who was consul-general at Cairo. He spent eight years in Egypt, being appointed consul in 1845. Whilst in Egypt, Benedetti met and eventually married a Greek slave woman who was a survivor of the Massacre of Chios. In 1848, he was made consul at Palermo, and in 1851, he accompanied the marquis, who had been appointed ambassador at Constantinople, as first secretary.

For fifteen months during the progress of the Crimean War, Benedetti acted as chargé d'affaires. In the second volume of his essays, he gives some recollections of his experiences in the East, including an account of Mehemet Ali, and a (not very friendly) sketch of Lord Stratford de Redcliffe. In 1855, after refusing the post of minister at Tehran, he was employed in the foreign office at Paris, and acted as secretary to the congress at Paris (1855–1856). During the next few years, he was chiefly occupied with Italian affairs, in which he was much interested, and Cavour said of him that he was an Italian at heart. He was chosen in 1861 to be the first envoy of France to the king of Italy, but he resigned his post the next year on the retirement of Édouard de Thouvenel, who had been his patron, when the anti-Italian party began to gain the ascendancy at Paris. In 1864, he was appointed ambassador at the court of Prussia.

Benedetti remained in Berlin until the outbreak of the Franco-Prussian War in 1870, and during these years, he played an important part in the diplomatic history of Europe. His position was a difficult one, for Napoleon III did not keep him fully informed as to the course of French policy. In 1866, the Austro-Prussian War broke out, and during the critical weeks which followed the attempt of Napoleon to intervene between Prussia and Austria, he accompanied the Prussian headquarters in the advance on Vienna. During a visit to Vienna, he helped to arrange the preliminaries of the armistice signed at Nikolsburg.

Following the end of the Austro-Prussian War, Benedetti was instructed to present to Bismarck the French demands for "compensation" for France's neutrality during the Austro-Prussian War - Prussian agreement for a French annexation of Belgium and Luxembourg. In August, after his return to Berlin, as a result of his discussions with Bismarck, a draft treaty was drawn up, in which Prussia promised France her support in the annexation of Belgium. This treaty was never concluded, but the draft, which was in Benedetti's handwriting, was kept by Bismarck and, in 1870, a few days after the outbreak of the war, was published by him in The Times.

During 1867, Benedetti was much occupied with the affair of Luxembourg, in which France attempted to purchase Luxembourg from the Netherlands. There was an immediate uproar in Germany from pan-German nationalists, and the pre-eminent German power (Prussia) seemed poised to declare war on France over the issue. The French government however was thwarted by the subsequent Conference of London, which confirmed the independence of Luxembourg, along with a guarantee of Luxembourg's independence by all European Great Powers.

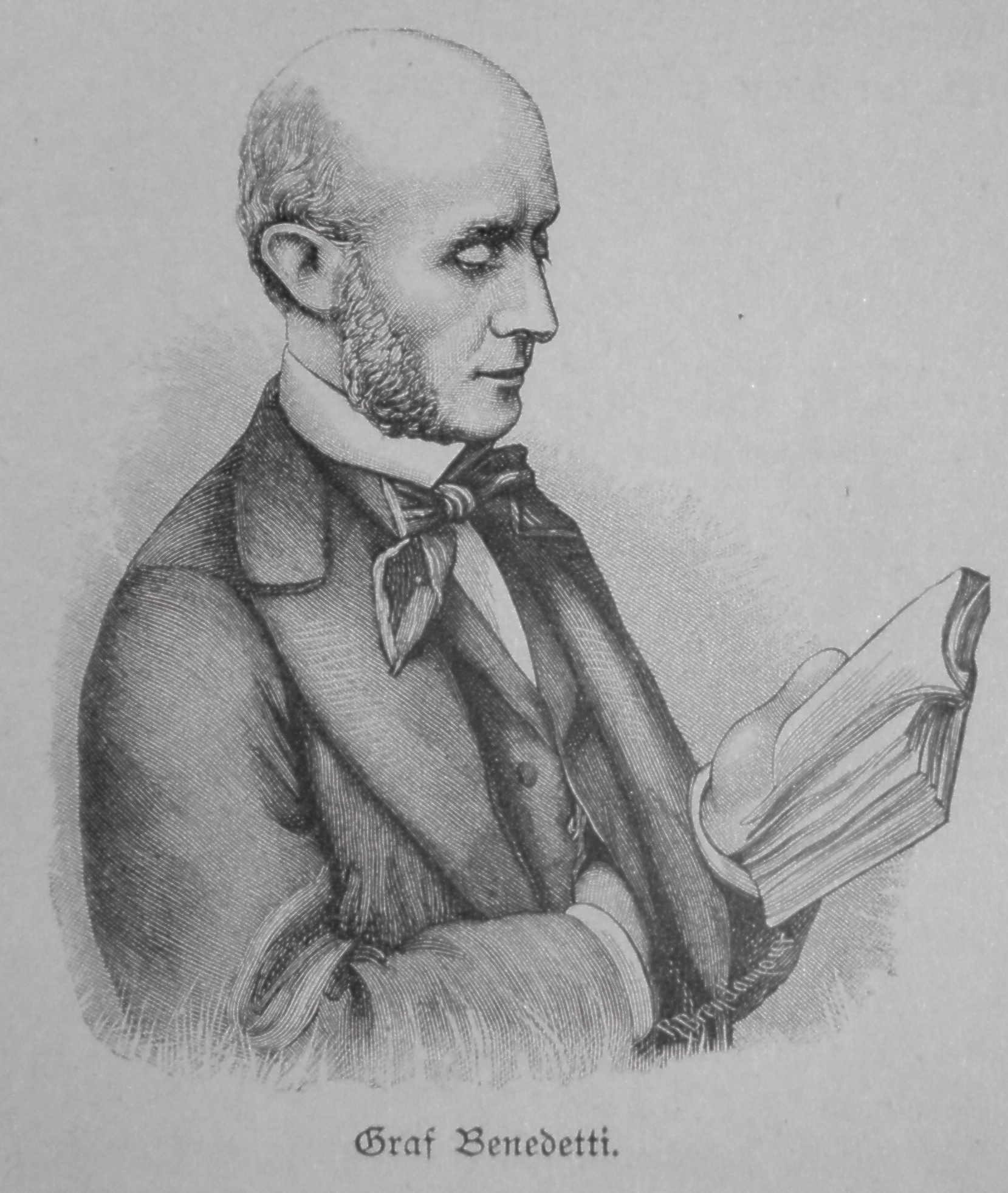
Benedetti in 1895–96

In July 1870, when the candidature of the prince of Hohenzollern for the throne of Spain became known, Benedetti was instructed by the duc de Gramont to present to the king of Prussia, who was then at Bad Ems, the French demands, that the king should order the prince to withdraw, and afterwards that the king should promise that the candidature would never be renewed. This last demand Benedetti submitted to the king in informal meetings on the promenade at Ems, and Bismarck's publication of the conversations gave the impression that Benedetti had approached the king in an undiplomatic way and that the king had reacted evenly inappropriately. The emotions stirred up by the incident and Bismarck's publication paved the way to the Franco-Prussian War which followed. Benedetti was severely attacked in his own country for his conduct as ambassador, and the duc de Gramont attempted to throw upon him the blame for the failures of French diplomacy.

Benedetti answered the charges brought against him in a book, Ma Mission en Prusse (Paris, 1871), which still remains one of the most valuable authorities for the study of Bismarck's diplomacy. In this, Benedetti successfully defends himself, and shows that he had kept his government well informed; he had even warned them a year before as to the proposed Hohenzollern candidature. Even if he had been outwitted by Bismarck in the matter of the treaty of 1866, the policy of the treaty was not his, but was that of E. Drouyn de Lhuys. The idea of the annexation of Wallonia, Belgium, to France had been suggested to him first by Bismarck; and the use to which Bismarck put the draft was not one which he could be expected to anticipate, for he had carried on the negotiations in good faith.

After the fall of the Empire, Benedetti retired to Corsica. He lived to see his defence confirmed by later publications, which threw more light on the secret history of the times. He published in 1895 a volume of Essais diplomatiques, containing a full account of his mission to Ems, written in 1873; and in 1897 a second series dealing with the Eastern question. He died on 28 March 1900, while on a visit to Paris. He received the title of Count from Napoleon.
