= Ems dispatch =

Telegram sent by Prussian king Wilhelm I to Otto Von Bismarck

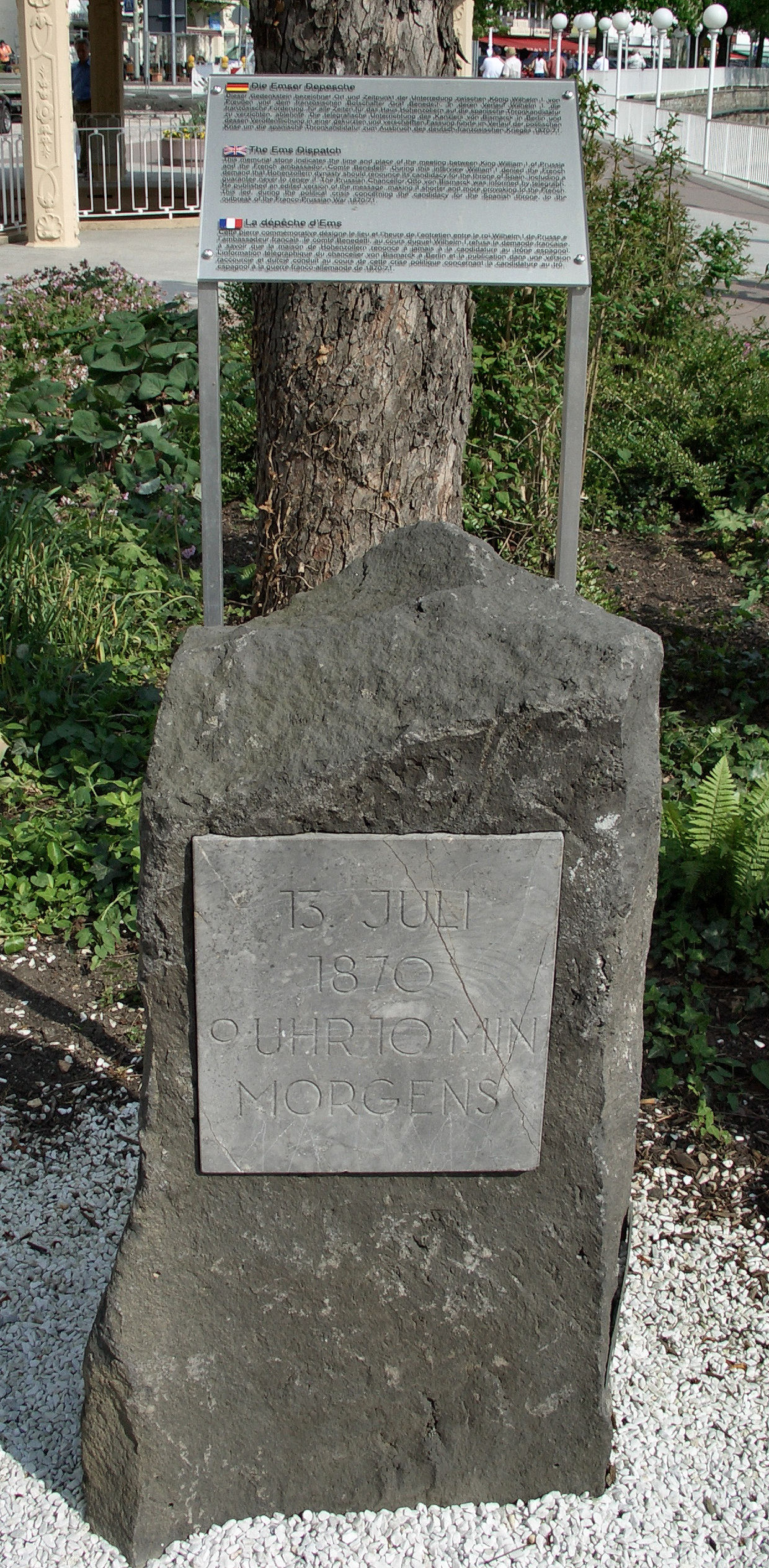
Memorial stone to the Ems dispatch in Bad Ems

The Ems dispatch (French: Dépêche d'Ems, German: Emser Depesche), sometimes called the Ems telegram, was published on 13 July 1870; it incited the Second French Empire to declare war on the Kingdom of Prussia on 19 July 1870, starting the Franco-Prussian War. The actual dispatch was an internal telegram sent by Heinrich Abeken from Prussian King Wilhelm I's vacationing site at Ems to Otto von Bismarck in Berlin, describing demands made by the French ambassador concerning the Spanish succession. Bismarck, the chancellor of the North German Confederation, released a statement to the press, stirring up emotions in both France and Germany.

The name referred to Bad Ems, a resort spa east of Koblenz on the Lahn river, then in Hesse-Nassau, a new possession of Prussia.

== Background ==
The Austro-Prussian War, from 16 June to 23 August 1866, which involved south and north German states on both sides as well as the emerging Italy, increased Prussia's power. Austria was defeated in the key Battle of Königgrätz (or Sadowa) on 3 July 1866. The preliminary Peace of Nikolsburg, 26 July, was followed by the Peace of Prague, 23 August. Bismarck thus managed to expel Austria from the German Confederation, to set up and dominate the North German Confederation (north of the Main) and to secure Prussian territorial gains. Hanover, Schleswig-Holstein, Nassau and Hesse-Cassel, and Frankfurt were incorporated into Prussia, whose territory expanded thus by nearly a quarter and its population by more than 4 million to roughly 24 million, which was still less than France's 38 million. France did not take part in the war, which was brief but altered the European balance of power, and did not gain territories or prestige. French demands for a revanche pour Sadova ("revenge for Sadowa") took root.

In early 1870, the German Prince Leopold, of the Catholic branch of Hohenzollern-Sigmaringen, (Note: The Hohenzollerns originated from Schwaben. Although strictly speaking, the Sigmaringens, who remained in Schwaben, were the senior branch of the Hohenzollerns, the Brandenburg branch enjoyed much greater status throughout its history.) had been offered the vacant Spanish throne. French Emperor Napoleon III and his government voiced concern over a possible Spanish alliance with the Protestant House of Hohenzollern, which ruled the Kingdom of Prussia, protested against the offer and hinted at war. Following the protests by France, Leopold had withdrawn his acceptance on 11 July 1870, which was already considered a diplomatic defeat for Prussia. The French were still not satisfied and demanded further commitments, especially a guarantee by the Prussian king that no member of any branch of his Hohenzollern family would ever be a candidate for the Spanish throne.

== Incident ==
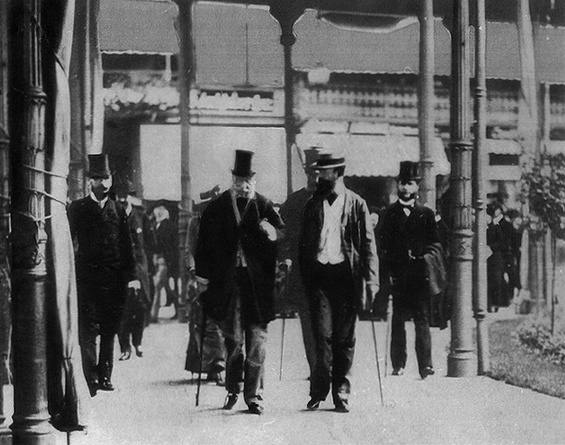
Wilhelm I of Prussia on vacation in spa town of Ems. On a stroll like this he was approached by the French ambassador

On 13 July 1870, King Wilhelm I of Prussia, on his morning stroll in the park of Ems, was stopped by Count Vincent Benedetti, the French ambassador to Prussia since 1864. Benedetti had been instructed by his superior, Foreign Minister Agenor, duc de Gramont, to present the French demand that the king should guarantee that he would never again permit the candidacy of a Hohenzollern prince to the Spanish throne. In addition, the Prussian envoy in Paris, Baron von Werther, was asked for King Wilhelm to send a letter to Napoleon III that would amount to a personal apology for the matter. The meeting was informal and took place on the promenade of the Kursaal with the King's entourage at a discreet distance. Politely and in a friendly manner, "with the courtesy that never failed him", the King refused to bind himself to any course of action into the indefinite future. After their exchange, "the two departed coolly."

Heinrich Abeken, Privy Legation Councillor of the North German Confederation's Foreign Office, wrote an account of the event for Otto von Bismarck in Berlin. Wilhelm described Benedetti as "annoyingly persistent". The King asked Bismarck to release an account of the events.

Bismarck had full liberty to inform the press in a suitable way; it was not his task to publish Abeken's original report. Bismarck decided to use some of Abeken's wording for his own press release. He removed Wilhelm's conciliatory phrases and emphasised the real issue. The French had made certain demands under threat of war, and Wilhelm had refused them. That was a clear statement of the facts.

Certainly, Bismarck's text, released on the evening of the same day to the media and foreign embassies, gave the impression both that Benedetti was rather more demanding and that the King was exceedingly abrupt. It was designed to give the French the impression that the King had insulted Benedetti; likewise, the Germans interpreted the modified dispatch as Benedetti insulting the King.

Bismarck had viewed the worsening relations with France with open satisfaction. If war had to come, then better sooner than later. His press release, he assured his friends, "would have the effect of a red rag on the Gallic [French] bull." The document was then to be presented as the cause of the war.

== Text ==
=== Abeken's message ===
His Majesty the King writes to me:

Count Benedetti intercepted me on the promenade to demand of me, finally in a very importunate manner, that I should authorize him to telegraph at once that I bound myself in perpetuity never again to give my consent if the Hohenzollerns renewed their candidature.

I rejected this demand somewhat sternly [ German: "etwas ernst" ], as it is neither right nor possible to undertake commitments of this kind à tout jamais.

Naturally, I told him that I had not yet received any news and that since he had been earlier informed concerning Paris and Madrid than I was, he must surely see that my government was not involved in the matter.

His Majesty later received a message from the Duke.

As His Majesty had told Count Benedetti that he was expecting news from the Duke, he personally, in view of the above-mentioned importunity, upon the advice of Count Eulenburg and myself, decided not to receive Count Benedetti any more, but merely to have him informed by an adjutant: that His Majesty had now received from the Duke confirmation of the news which Benedetti had already had from Paris and had nothing further to say to the ambassador.

His Majesty suggests to Your Excellency, that Benedetti's new demand and its rejection might well be communicated both to our ambassadors and to the Press.

=== Bismarck's communiqué ===
After the news of the renunciation of the Prince von Hohenzollern had been communicated to the Imperial French government by the Royal Spanish government, the French Ambassador in Ems made a further demand on His Majesty the King that he should authorize him to telegraph to Paris that His Majesty the King undertook for all time never again to give his assent should the Hohenzollerns once more take up their candidature.

His Majesty the King thereupon refused to receive the Ambassador again and had the latter informed by the Adjutant of the day that His Majesty had no further communication to make to the Ambassador.

=== French translation ===
The French translation by the agency Havas did not translate the German word Adjutant, which refers to a high-ranking aide de camp, but in French, it describes only a non-commissioned officer (adjudant), which implied that the King had deliberately insulted the ambassador by not choosing an officer to carry the message to him. That was the version printed by most newspapers the following day, which happened to be July 14 (Bastille Day), setting the tone, letting the French believe that the king had insulted their ambassador before the latter could tell his story.

== Aftermath ==
France's mistaken attitude of its own position carried matters far beyond what was necessary, and France mobilized. Further improper translations and misinterpretations of the dispatch in the press made excited crowds in Paris demand war, just as Bismarck had anticipated. The Ems dispatch had also rallied German national feeling. It was no longer Prussia alone; South German particularism was now cast aside.

For the French declaration of war the dispatch and the message to the press was rather irrelevant. Napoléon had already decided to go to war to stabilize his regime and keep its dominant position in Europe. This intention did not depend on Bismarck's action. France went to war because it believed that it would win. Contrary to popular belief, Bismarck did not prepare everything long before (he himself had contributed to that myth). As a good politician, he tried to keep several options open; when the opportunity showed up, he published the message to the press with the intention to stir up the emotions.

Benedetti, the messenger for the Duc de Gramont's demands for pointless guarantees (the Hohenzollern-Sigmaringen family had withdrawn Prince Leopold's candidature on 11 July 1870 with Wilhelm's "entire and unreserved approval"), became an unseen bit-player; his own dispatches to Paris no longer mattered. In the legislative chamber, by an overwhelming majority, the votes for war credits were passed. France declared war on 19 July 1870, starting the Franco-Prussian War. Following the French defeat in 1871, the Duc de Gramont attempted to throw the blame for the failures of French diplomacy on Benedetti, who published his version of the events in his defence in Ma mission en Prusse (Paris, 1871).

== See also ==
- Alvensleben Convention
- Schnaebele incident
- German Unification

== Sources ==
- Howard, Michael (1988) [originally published in 1961 by Routledge]. The Franco-Prussian War (illustrated ed.). Psychology Press. ISBN 978-0415027878.
- Koch, H.W. (1978). A History of Prussia (1st ed.). Abingdon-on-Thames: Routledge. ISBN 978-0582481909.
