= Airgram =

US diplomatic message sent by diplomatic bag

An airgram (abbr. agam or agram) is a US diplomatic term for a message sent by courier via the diplomatic bag instead of by telegram.

The words "AIR" and "GRAM" separated by a mark which resembles an elongated "V" is a trademarked design used on envelopes and referred to as an AirGram. This product is primarily used in quick turn around direct mail to express a sense of urgency to the mail recipient. It was first used for this purpose in 1992.
