= Hermann Abeken =

German political writer and statistician

Hermann Abeken (27 June 1820 – 27 April 1854) was a German political writer and statistician. He was the third son of Bernhard Rudolf Abeken.

Abelen was born in Osnabrück in the Kingdom of Hanover. He worked as merchant in New York City, but returned to Europe due to a chest affliction. A friend of his brother Friedrich, the young Count of Görz-Schliz, urged him to begin his law studies in Göttingen and Berlin. Beginning in autumn 1846 he began to write, influenced by his stay in the United States and statistical news.

In the summer of 1848 he was assigned head of the newly inaugurated statistical bureau at the Ministry of Stüve in Hannover. Abelen wrote for the daily press, where he supported the political decisions and goals of the Ministry. He died in Hannover in 1854.

== Publications ==
- Amerikanische Negersklaverei und Emancipation, 1847
- Die Republik in Nordamerika und der Plan einer demokratisch-republikanischen Verfassung für Deutschland, 1848
- 1789. 1848. Mirabeau über das königliche Veto, 1848
- Zur Statistik des Königreichs Hannover, booklets 1–3, 1850-1853
- Der Eintritt der Türkei in die europäische Politik des 18. Jahrhunderts, 1856, published after his death by Carl Bertram Stüve.

== Sources ==
- Allgemeine Deutsche Biographie - online version at Wikisource
