= Wilhelm Ludwig Abeken =

German archaeologist (1813–1843)

- Born: April 30, 1813; Osnabrück, Germany
- Died: January 29, 1843 (aged 29); Munich, Kingdom of Bavaria
- Occupation: Archaeologist
- Known for: Mittelitalien vor den Zeiten der römischen Herrschaft, nach den Denkmälern (1843)

Wilhelm Ludwig Abeken (30 April 1813 – 29 January 1843) was a German archaeologist.

He was born in Osnabrück, the eldest son of Bernhard Rudolf Abeken.

Abeken learned archeology under Eduard Gerhard himself. In 1836, he went to Rome to study the Italy of the pre-Roman times. He collected materials for a mythology of Italy and a monography on the Capitol. However, only his work Mittelitalien vor den Zeiten der römischen Herrschaft, nach den Denkmälern (1843) was ever finished. A fever forced him to return to Munich, where he died at the age of 29.

== Sources ==
- Allgemeine Deutsche Biographie - online version at Wikisource
