= London Conference of 1867 =

The conference of the six Great Powers (which for the first time included Italy) which met in London in May 1867, to settle the political order of northern Europe after the disruption of the German Confederation in 1866, is known as the London Conference of 1867. It resulted in the Treaty of London on 11 May 1867. The immediate occasion of the conference was the necessity of settling the status of the Grand Duchy of Luxemburg, which, after the downfall of Napoleon, had been added to the dominions of the King of the Netherlands as a separate and independent state and made a member of the German Confederation. Notwithstanding the dissolution of the Confederation, Luxembourg continued to be occupied by Prussian troops, the French government insisting upon the removal of these troops and threatening war to enforce the demand, resulting in the Luxembourg Crisis.

The conference was called to avert the new danger to the peace of Europe, and it solved the problem by the statesmanlike device of placing the grand duchy under the collective guarantee of the Great Powers as a permanently neutralized territory. The conference is notable for its clear recognition of the principle of neutralization and of the rights of a neutralized state, as well as the obligations incurred by the Powers joining in the collective guarantee.

In an individual guarantee, such as that guaranteeing the neutrality of Belgium, powers that signed the treaty would be bound individually to defend a nation's neutrality regardless of the actions of the other signatories. In a collective guarantee, such as this treaty with Luxembourg, the major signatories would act in concert or would not be required to act at all. The distinction between individual and collective guarantee resulted in some confusion when the Germans invaded both Belgium and Luxembourg in August 1914. Since Germany inherited Prussia's 1867 commitment to a collective guarantee, by invading Luxembourg it rendered impossible any joint action in defense of Luxembourg's neutrality. Britain was therefore not required to intervene to defend Luxembourg. However, since Belgium was individually guaranteed by the major powers (including Britain), the British government felt obliged to defend its neutrality against German invasion.
