= Heinrich Abeken =

German theologian (1809–1872)

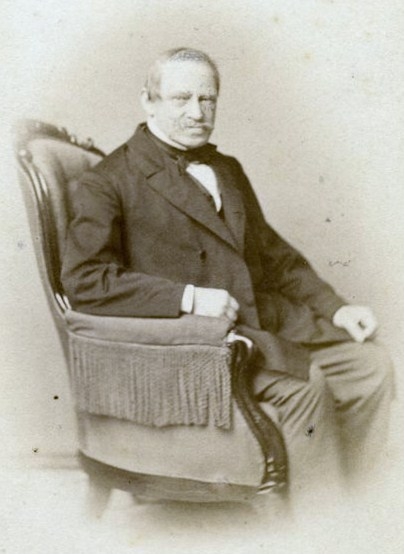
- Born: 19 August 1809; Osnabrück, Germany
- Died: 8 August 1872 (aged 62)
- Education: University of Berlin
- Occupation: German Theologian

Heinrich Abeken (19 August 1809 – 8 August 1872) was a German theologian and Prussian Privy Legation Councillor in the Ministry of Foreign Affairs in Berlin.

== Early life ==
Abeken was born and raised in the city of Osnabrück as a son of a merchant, he was incited to a higher education by the example of his uncle Bernhard Rudolf Abeken. After finishing the college in Osnabrück, he moved in 1827 to visit the University of Berlin to study theology. He combined philosophical and philological studies and was interested in art and modern literature.

== Career ==
In 1831, Abeken acquired a licenciate of theology. At the end of the year he visited Rome, and was welcomed in the house of Christian Karl Josias, Freiherr von Bunsen. Abeken participated in Bunsen's works, namely an evangelical prayer and hymn-book. In 1834 he became chaplain to the Prussian embassy in Rome. He married his first wife, who died soon thereafter. Bunsen left Rome in 1838 and Abeken followed soon thereafter to Germany. In 1841, he was sent to England to help in founding a German-English missionary bishopric in Jerusalem. In the same year, he was sent by Frederick William IV of Prussia to Egypt and Ethiopia, where he joined an expedition led by professor Karl Richard Lepsius. In 1845 and 1846 he returned via Jerusalem and Rome to Germany. He became Legation Councillor in Berlin, later Council Referee at the Ministry of Foreign Affairs.

In 1848 he received an appointment in the Prussian ministry for foreign affairs, and in 1853, he was promoted to be privy councillor of legation (Geheimer Legationsrath). Abeken remained in charge for more than twenty years of Prussian politics, assisting Otto Theodor Freiherr von Manteuffel and Chancellor Otto von Bismarck. The latter was so much pleased with Abeken's work that officials started to call Abeken "the quill [i.e., the scribe] of Bismarck." Abeken married again in 1866; his second wife was Hedwig von Olfers, daughter of the general director of the royal museums, Privy Councilor von Olfers.

He was much employed by Bismarck in the writing of official despatches, and stood high in the favour of King William, whom he often accompanied on his journeys as representative of the foreign office. He was present with the king during the campaigns of 1866 and 1870–71. In 1851, he published anonymously Babylon und Jerusalem, a scathing criticism of the views of Ida, Countess von Hahn-Hahn.

During the war against Austria in 1866 as well as in the wars against France in 1870 and 1871, Abeken stayed in the Prussian headquarters. A major part of the dispatches of the time have been written by him, especially the Ems Dispatch of 13 July 1870. Unfortunately his health was damaged by the endeavours of these travels, and he died after an illness of several months. Emperor Wilhelm I described Abeken in a condolence letter to his widow: "One of my most reliable advisors, standing on my side in the most decisive moments; his loss is irreplaceable to me; In him his fatherland has lost one of the most noble and most loyal men and officials".

Despite his engagement in politics, Abeken never lost his interest in theology and continued to publish and speak in this sector during all of his life. He was interested in art and archeology, and was sponsor of the Archeological Institute of Rome and member of the Archeological Society of Rome. He founded a Circle of Friends of the Greek Literature in Berlin and was member of the prize commission for the royal Schiller-Prize. (Note: See Heinrich Abeken, ein schlichtes Leben in bewegter Zeit (Berlin, 1898), by his widow, Hedwig. This is valuable by reason of the letters written from the Prussian headquarters. An English translation by Mrs. Charles Edward Barrett-Lennard and M. W. Hoper was published in 1911 under the title Bismarck's Pen: The Life of Heinrich Abeken.)

== Publications ==
- A letter to the Reverend E. B. Pusey in reference to certain charges against the German Church, (1842)
- Babylon und Jerusalem (1851), letter to Countess Ida Hahn-Hahn
- Der Gottesdienst der alten Kirche (1853)
- Das religiöse Leben des Islam (1854)
- biography of Bunsen in the Jahrbuch zum Conversationslexikon (Leipzig, Brockhaus), Unsere Zeit (1861)
- Wolfgang Frischbier, Heinrich Abeken 1809–1872. Eine Biographie Paderborn: Ferdinand Schöningh, 2008 (Otto-von-Bismarck-Stiftung. Wissenschaftliche Reihe, 9).
