= Bernhard Rudolf Abeken =

German philologist and literature historian

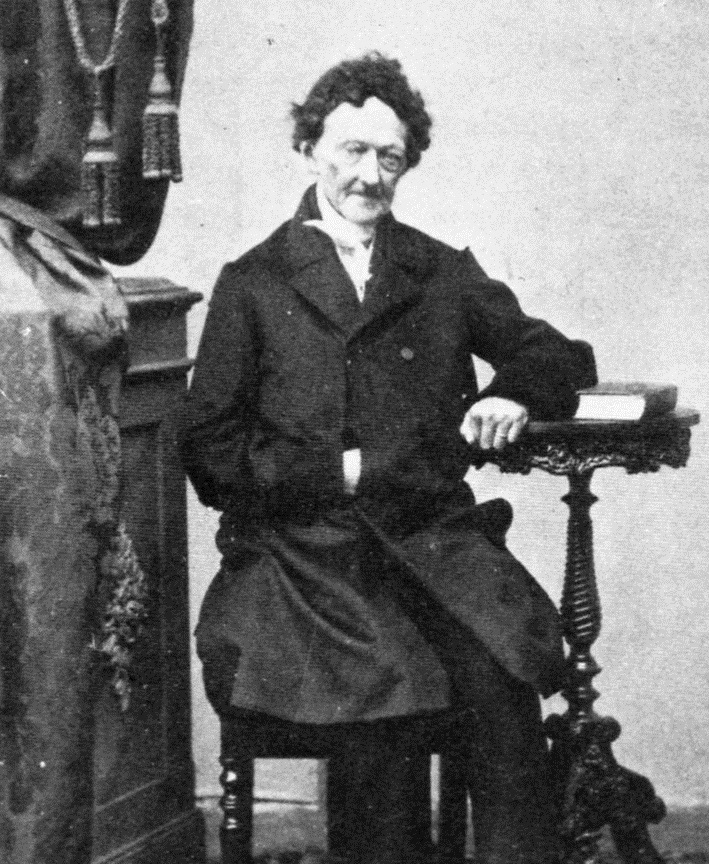
Image of Bernhard Rudolf Abeken

Bernhard Rudolf Abeken (1 December 1780 – 24 February 1866) was a German philologist and literature historian.

== Life ==
Abeken was born in Osnabrück. His father was a Catholic merchant, who was much religious for his family. Thus, Bernhard Abeken, who was an avid reader since being five years old, started reading religious and historical literature.

After finishing college in 1799, Abeken went to the University of Jena to study theology, and also began with philosophy and general studies. While in Jena, he often visited the house of Johann Jakob Griesbach where he had the opportunity to meet with famous German poets. This led him soon to abandon his initial career aspiration and to engage in newer literature and general education. In 1802, he became teacher in the house of minister von der Recke, in Berlin. There, Abeken studied further science and arts. In 1808 he went to Weimar to educate Schiller's children. In Jena, Berlin, Weimar, and Rudolstadt, these were Abeken's most active years within intellectual circles.

In 1810 he became vice headmaster at the college of Rudolstadt. Five years later, he answered the call to the college of Osnabrück, also as its vice headmaster, there to start a series of reforms. In 1841 he became headmaster. Abeken retired in 1863, but nevertheless continued to teach about Sophocles and Cicero till his death in 1866.

Bernhard is the father of two famous sons, Hermann Abelen and Wilhelm Ludwig Abelen.

== Works ==
Bernhard Abeken studied the history of literature, specially when reviewing.

Abeken held lectures on Dante Alighieri, in Rudolstadt (1814–1815) and Berlin (1808). He disliked seeking allegories in the Divine Comedy, instead looking for more ethical and religious interpretations.

- Beiträge zum Studium der göttlichen Comödie Dante's, 1826.
- Cicero in seinen Briefen, 1835
- Ein Stück aus Goethe's Leben, 1848
- Goethe in den Jahren 1771–75, 1861
- editor of the complete edition of the works of Justus Möser, 1842–43

== Sources ==
- Allgemeine Deutsche Biographie - online version at Wikisource
