= Étienne François de Choiseul, Duke of Choiseul =

French Royal Army officer, diplomat and statesman (1719–1785)

The Most High and Most Potent Lord Étienne-François de Choiseul
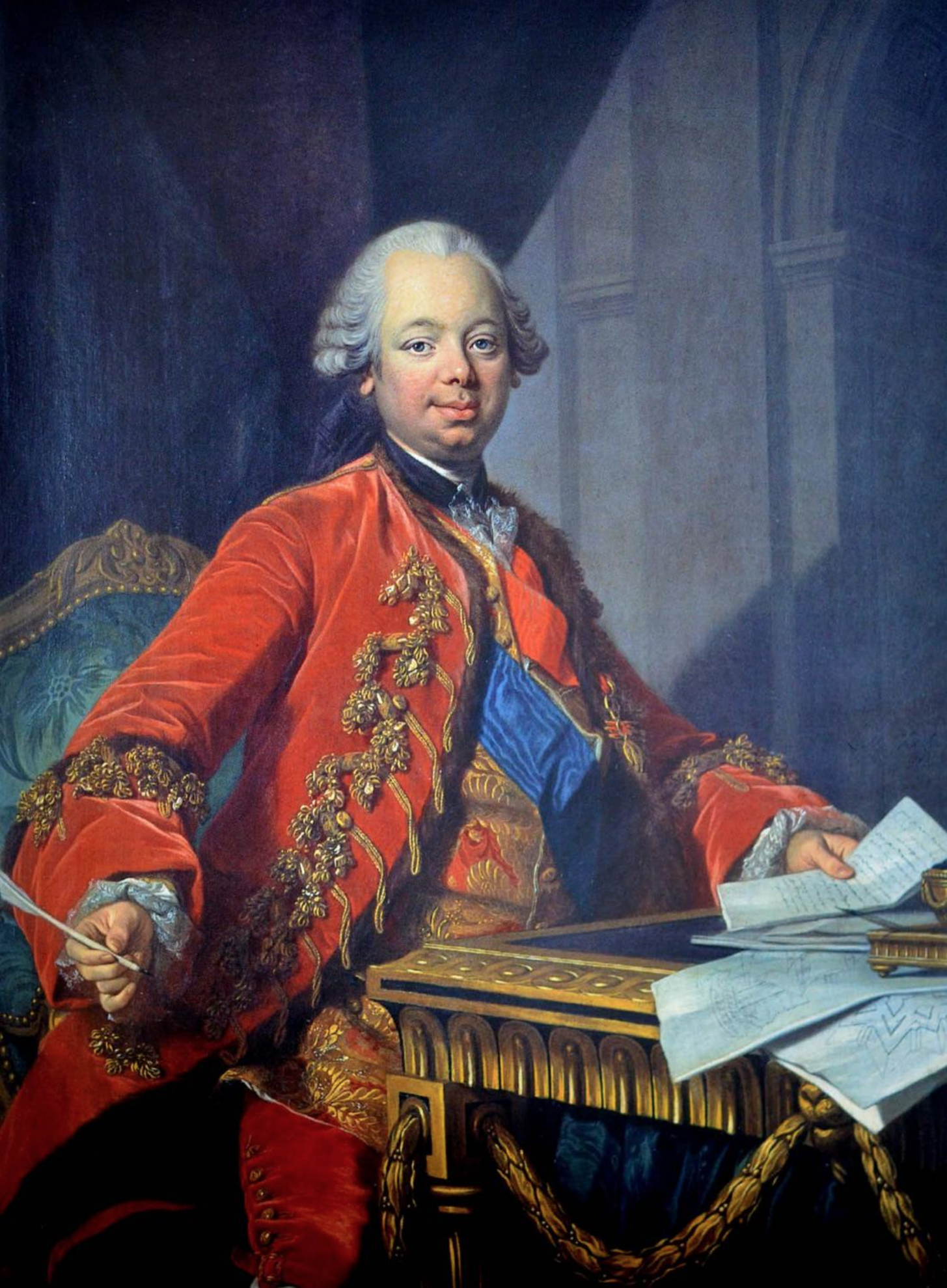
- Portrait by Louis-Michel van Loo, 1763

First Minister of State
- In office 3 December 1758 – 24 December 1770
- Monarch: Louis XV
- Preceded by: André-Hercule de Fleury (1743)
- Succeeded by: René Nicolas Charles Augustin de Maupeou

Secretary of State for Foreign Affairs of France
- In office 3 December 1758 – 13 October 1761
- Monarch: Louis XV
- First Minister of State: Himself
- Preceded by: François-Joachim de Pierre de Bernis
- Succeeded by: César Gabriel de Choiseul
- In office 10 April 1766 – 24 December 1770
- Monarch: Louis XV
- First Minister of State: Himself
- Preceded by: César Gabriel de Choiseul
- Succeeded by: Louis Phélypeaux

Secretary of State for War of France
- In office 27 January 1761 – 24 December 1770
- Monarch: Louis XV
- First Minister of State: Himself
- Preceded by: Charles Louis Auguste Fouquet
- Succeeded by: Louis Phélypeaux

Secretary of State for the Navy of France
- In office 15 October 1761 – 10 April 1766
- Monarch: Louis XV
- First Minister of State: Himself
- Preceded by: Nicolas René Berryer
- Succeeded by: Nicolas René Berryer

Ambassador of the Kingdom of France to the Archduchy of Austria
- In office 1757–1758
- Monarch: Louis XV
- Secretary of State for Foreign Affairs: François-Joachim de Pierre de Bernis
- Preceded by: Louis Charles César Le Tellier
- Succeeded by: César Gabriel de Choiseul

Personal details
- Born: 28 June 1719 Nancy, Duchy of Lorraine
- Died: 8 May 1785 (aged 65) Paris, Ile-de-France, France
- Awards: Order of the Holy Spirit; Order of the Golden Fleece
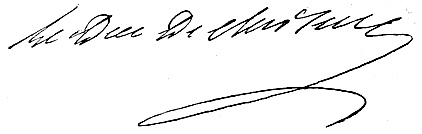
- Signature

Military service
- Allegiance: France
- Branch/service: French Royal Army
- Years of service: 1740–1770
- Rank: Lieutenant general
- Battles/wars: Russo-Turkish War; War of the Austrian Succession; Seven Years' War

Lieutenant-General Étienne François de Choiseul, Duke of Choiseul, KOHS, OGF (French: [etjɛn fʁɑ̃swa də ʃwazœl]; 28 June 1719 – 8 May 1785) was a French Royal Army officer, diplomat and statesman. From 1758 to 1761 and again from 1766 to 1770, he served as Foreign Minister of France and had a strong influence on France's global strategy throughout the period. Choiseul is closely associated with France's defeat in the Seven Years' War and subsequent efforts to rebuild French prestige.

== Biography ==
=== Rise ===
The eldest son of François Joseph de Choiseul, marquis de Stainville (1700–1770), Étienne François was born in Nancy, the capital of the Duchy of Lorraine where his father was one of the leading advisors to the Duke of Lorraine who ruled an independent French-speaking state with close cultural and political links with France. At birth, he bore the title of comte de Stainville. In 1737, Francis Stephen of Lorraine (the future Holy Roman Emperor Francis I) was pressured into giving up Lorraine and becoming ruler of Tuscany in Italy. Realising that continued loyalty to the House of Lorraine would limit his opportunities, Étienne François transferred his allegiance to France.

After gaining experience during the Austro-Turkish War, the comte de Stainville entered the French army, and during the War of the Austrian Succession served in Bohemia (1741) and in Italy (1744), where he distinguished himself at the Battle of Coni. He was also present at the Battle of Dettingen in Germany and carried news of the French defeat there to Paris. He had been appalled by what he had witnessed of the French forces at Dettingen, particularly what he later described as their "indifference and ignorance", and his experiences motivated his later reforms of the French military, where Pierre Victor, Baron de Besenval, played a key role.

From 1745 to 1748, he was with the army in the Low Countries and was present at the sieges of Mons, Charleroi and Maastricht. He attained the rank of lieutenant-general and, in 1750, married Louise Honorine Crozat, daughter of Louis François Crozat, marquis du Châtel (died 1750), who brought her husband her share of the large fortune of her grandfather Antoine Crozat as well as his brother Pierre's grand Hôtel Crozat on the rue de Richelieu, and proved a most devoted wife.

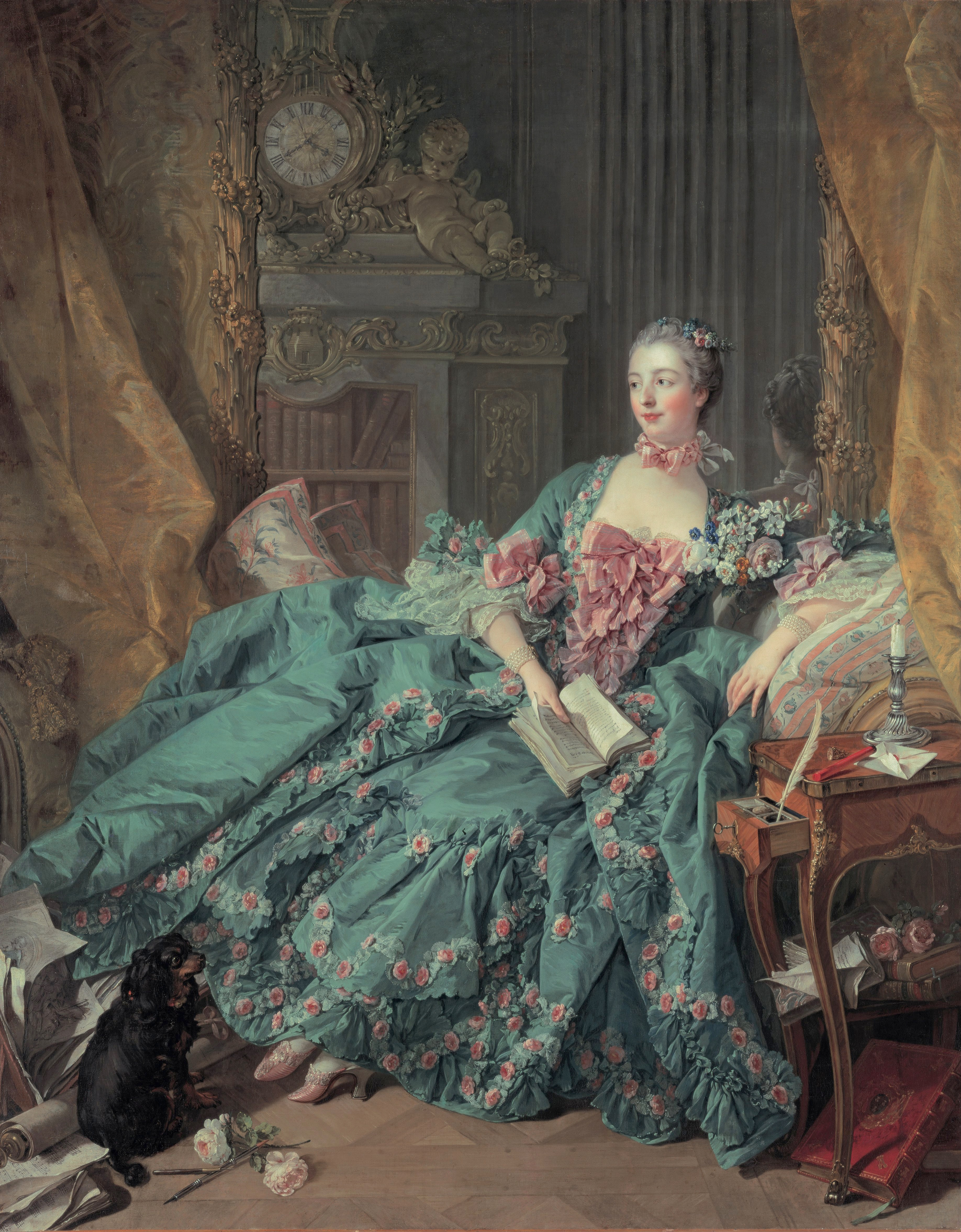
Choiseul rose to power in part through the patronage of Madame de Pompadour.

Choiseul gained the favour of Madame de Pompadour by procuring for her letters that King Louis XV had written to his cousin's wife, Charlotte-Rosalie de Romanet, comtesse de Choiseul-Baupré, with whom the king had formerly had an intrigue; and after a short time as bailli of the Vosges, he was given the appointment of ambassador to Rome in 1753, where he was entrusted with the negotiations concerning the disturbances called forth by the papal bull Unigenitus. He acquitted himself skillfully in this task, and, in 1757, his patroness obtained his transfer to Vienna, where he was instructed to cement the new alliance between France and Austria. He was one of the principal authors of the Second Treaty of Versailles, signed in May 1757, which pledged the two states to a combined war in Germany against Prussia.

=== Chief minister ===
==== Seven Years' War ====
His success in Vienna opened the way to a larger career in 1758, when he supplanted Cardinal de Bernis as minister for foreign affairs and so largely had the direction of French foreign and military policy during the Seven Years' War. In 1759, he planned an ambitious invasion of Britain which was halted by French naval defeats at the Battle of Lagos and the Battle of Quiberon Bay. His other major plan to achieve victory in 1759 was an attack on Hanover, which was thwarted by the French defeat at the Battle of Minden. Between 1759 and 1762, further French moves into Germany were unsuccessful, including the Battle of Villinghausen.

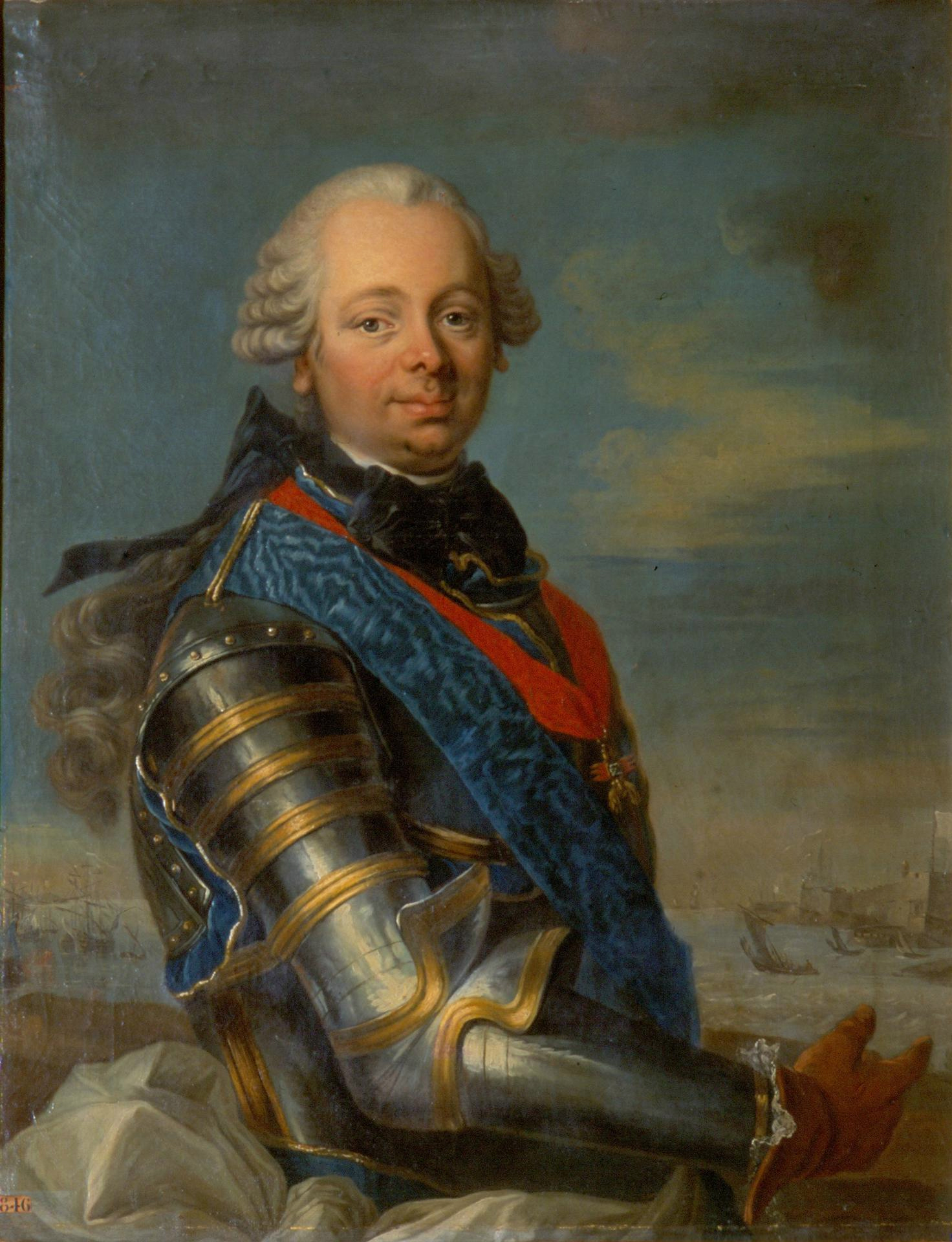
Duke of Choiseul, depicted wearing armor and the Order of the Holy Spirit (blue) and the Order of the Golden Fleece (red, Spain n°756), second half of 18th century

He was then made a peer of France and created duc de Choiseul. Although from 1761 to 1766, his cousin César Gabriel de Choiseul, duc de Praslin, was minister for foreign affairs, Choiseul continued to control the policy of France until 1770 and held most of the other important offices of state at the time. As author of the Pacte de Famille, he sought to retrieve the disastrous results of the alliance with Austria by an alliance with the Spanish House of Bourbon, but his action came too late. His vigorous policy in other departments of state was not, however, fruitless.

Coming to power during the demoralization after the defeats of Rossbach and Krefeld, by boldness and energy he reformed and strengthened both army and navy, and, although too late to prevent the loss of Canada and India, he developed French colonies in the Antilles and San Domingo. His management of home affairs in general satisfied the philosophes. He allowed the Encyclopédie to be published and brought about the banishment of the Jesuits and the temporary abolition of the order by Pope Clement XIV.

==== Rebuilding French power ====
In the years following the 1763 Treaty of Paris, Choiseul attempted to rebuild the French military. Alarmed by the British victory in the Seven Years' War and the upset in the European balance of power that followed, he tried to secure continued Spanish support for a future war of revenge against Britain and drew up a number of plans for an invasion of Britain. In an effort to compensate for French territorial losses, he added Corsica and Lorraine to the crown of France. He directed the French conquest of Corsica. He also oversaw a failed scheme to settle Guiana at Kourou.

By the late 1760s Choiseul was concerned by the growing strength of Russia around the Baltic Sea fearing that Britain was behind it. He believed they were planning a "northern league" against France. To counter this he hoped to depose or severely weaken the power of Catherine the Great by encouraging the Ottoman Empire to attack Russia.

However, Choiseul's fall was caused by his action against the Jesuits and by his support of their opponent La Chalotais, and of the provincial parlements. After the death of Madame de Pompadour in 1764, his enemies, incorporating the King's new mistress, Madame du Barry, in their plots, and the chancellor Maupeou, were too strong for him. He had supported his sister Béatrix de Choiseul-Stainville, in her attempt to succeed Madame de Pompadour as the king's mistress, which placed him in opposition to Madame du Barry. In an attempt to boost the Austrian alliance, Choiseul was an advocate of the marriage between the Dauphin, the future Louis XVI, and the archduchess Marie Antoinette, a daughter of the Holy Roman Empress Maria Theresa and the Emperor Francis I. Choiseul considered the marriage a personal triumph and believed it would cement his position of power.

In 1770, a dispute between Britain and Spain over the Falkland Islands threatened to flare into open warfare. As part of his long-term strategy to overturn what he perceived as British hegemony, Choiseul strongly supported Spain and mobilised the French military in preparation for war. Louis XV, who sought peace after the wars that had dominated much of his reign, was angry when he discovered that. At the height of the Falkland Crisis in 1770, Choiseul was dismissed and ordered to retire to his country estate, the Château de Chanteloup. The crisis was then settled peacefully by Britain and Spain.

=== Retirement ===
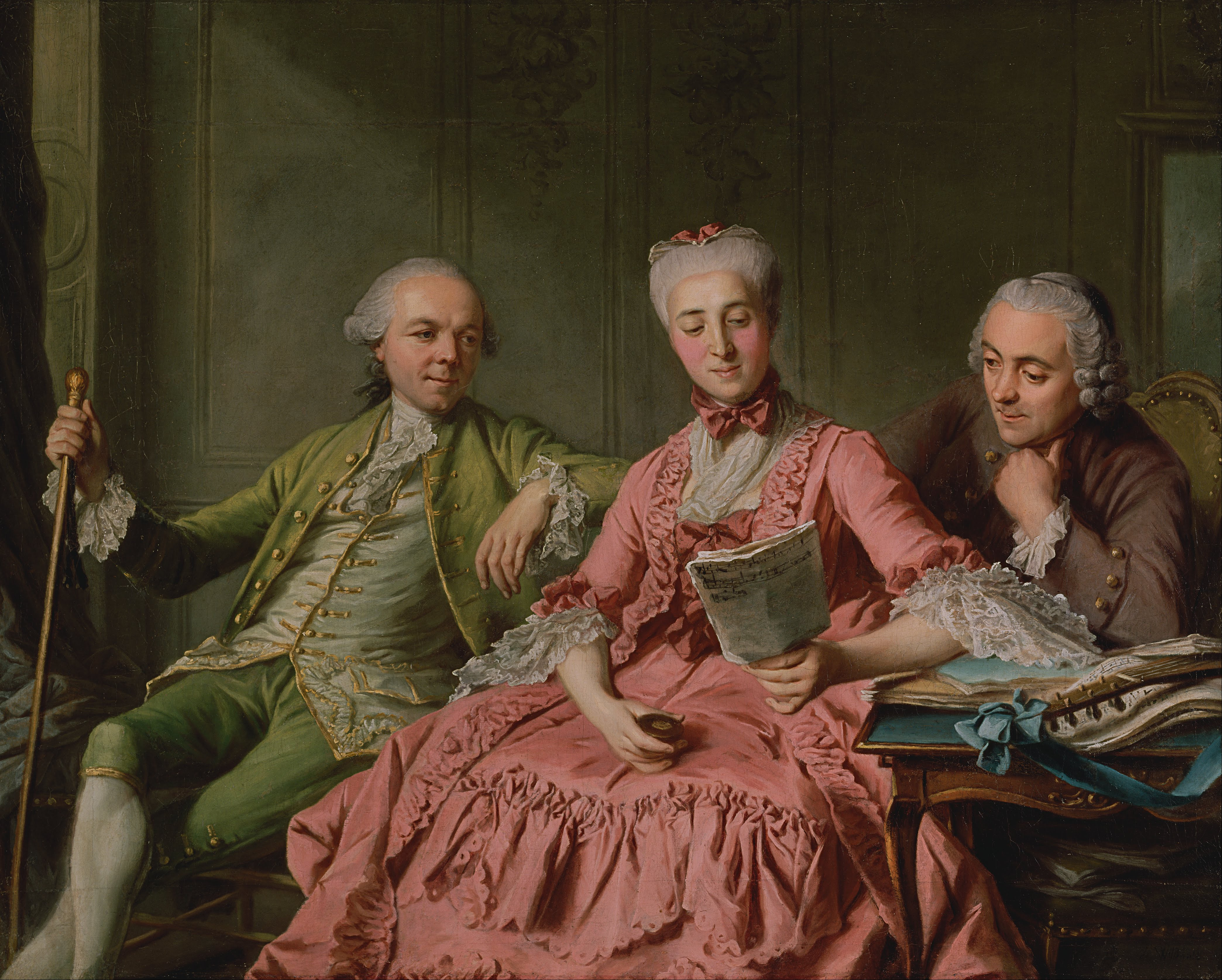
Duc de Choiseul, Madame de Brionne and Abbé Barthélemy (1775)

The intrigues against him had, however, increased his popularity, which was already great, and, during his retirement, which lasted until 1774, he lived in the greatest affluence and was visited by many eminent figures. He was succeeded as chief minister of France by Emmanuel-Armand de Richelieu, duc d'Aiguillon whose foreign policy was similar to that of Choiseul. D'Aiguillon favoured a more absolute monarchy than Choiseul did, and was strongly connected to the faction grouped around Madame Du Barry. Choiseul enjoyed widespread popularity and many people came to bid him farewell, as a gesture of support, as he prepared to leave Paris for his Chanteloup estate. In 1771, he participated in the unsuccessful attempt to arrange a secret marriage between the king and Albertine-Elisabeth Pater in order to depose Madame du Barry.

Greatly to Choiseul's disappointment, Louis XVI did not restore him to his former position although the king allowed him to come back to Paris in 1774. Choiseul died in his private residence, the Hôtel Delaunay, in Paris, on 8 May 1785 and was buried in Chanteloup. He left a huge accumulation of debts, which was scrupulously discharged by his widow. Choiseul's widow, a woman "in whom industrious malice could not find an imperfection", lived in retirement until her death, on 3 December 1801.

== Assessment ==
Choiseul possessed both ability and diligence, and though lacking in tenacity, he showed foresight and liberality in his direction of affairs. In appearance he was a short, ill-featured man, with a ruddy countenance and a sturdy frame. His Mémoires were written during his exile in Chanteloup, and are merely detached notes upon different questions.

English writer Horace Walpole, in his Memoirs, gives a vivid description of the duke's character, accuses him of having caused the Russo-Turkish War (1768–1774), as a revenge on Tsarina Catherine II and says of his foreign policy: "he would project and determine the ruin of a country, but could not meditate a little mischief or a narrow benefit.... He dissipated the nation's wealth and his own; but did not repair the latter by plunder of the former". In reference to Choiseul's private life, Walpole asserts that "gallantry without delicacy was his constant pursuit".

== Art collection ==
Choiseul was interested in music, theatre, and art. He created one of the most important collections of paintings in France and was a generous patron of many French artists. The items in his collection are known with some accuracy because of two important visual records: first, a snuffbox, often referred to as the 'Choiseul box', with five miniature paintings (1770–1771) by Louis-Nicolas van Blarenberghe, depicting the interior of his Paris residence, the Hôtel de Choiseul on the Rue de Richelieu; and second, a 1771 catalog of his collection with engravings created by Pierre-François Basan.

Choiseul's collection of paintings mainly consisted of Dutch, Flemish, and French pictures, and included eight works by Rembrandt (for example, the Finding of Moses, Philadelphia Museum of Art), Jacob van Ruisdael's Shore at Egmond aan Zee (National Gallery, London), Gerard ter Borch's Woman Playing a Theorbo to Two Men (National Gallery, London), Philips Wouwerman's Stag Hunt (Hermitage Museum, St. Petersburg), Claude Lorrain's Mercury and Io (National Gallery, Dublin), Louis Le Nain's Forge (Louvre, Paris), Jean-Baptiste Greuze's Girl with a Dog (Upton House, Warwickshire) and Sacrifice to Love (Wallace Collection, London), Joseph Vernet's Rock Arch (Musée des Beaux-Arts, Nîmes), Hubert Robert's Egyptian Palace by the Sea (Musée des Beaux-Arts, Dunkirk) and Joseph-Marie Vien's Greek Girl at the Bath (Museo de Arte, Ponce).

Choiseul also owned a large number of engraved views of France (including works by Claude Chastillon, Israel Silvestre, Albert Flamen, and Reinier Nooms) and one of the most famous pieces of French furniture of the 18th century, a desk later owned by Talleyrand, Franz von Wolff-Metternich, and Edmond Adolphe de Rothschild, that has been attributed to the ébéniste Antoine Gaudreau and the bronze-chaser Jacques Caffieri.

== Commemoration and popular culture ==
Choiseul Island, the largest island of the Solomon Islands is named after him.

Choiseul Sound, a major inlet on East Falkland is named after him.

Choiseul appears in the 1934 film Madame du Barry where he is played by Henry O'Neill.

Choiseul appears in the 2006 film Marie Antoinette, directed by Sofia Coppola, where he is played by Jean-Christophe Bouvet.

== Sources ==
- Anonymous (1996). "Choiseul(-Stainville), Étienne-François, Duc de", vol. 7, pp. 193–195, in The Dictionary of Art (34 vols.), edited by Jane Turner. New York: Grove. ISBN 9781884446009. Also at Oxford Art Online, subscription required.
- Basan, Pierre-François (1771). Recueil d'estampes gravées d'après les tableaux du Cabinet de Monseigneur le duc de Choiseul. Paris: Pierre-François Basan.
- Black, Jeremy (1999). From Louis XIV to Napoleon: The Fate of a Great Power. London: Routledge. ISBN 978-1857289343.
- Blaufarb, Rafe (2002). The French Army, 1750–1820: Careers, Talent, Merit. Manchester: Manchester University Press. ISBN 978-0719062629.
- Dull, Jonathan R. (2005). The French Navy and the Seven Years' War. Lincoln: University of Nebraska. ISBN 978-0803260245.
- Murphy, Orville T. (1982). Charles Gravier, Comte de Vergennes: French Diplomacy in the Age of Revolution, 1719–1787. Albany: State University of New York Press. ISBN 978-0873954822.
- Lever, Evelyne (2000). Marie Antionette: The Last Queen of France. New York: St. Martin's Griffin. ISBN 978-0274864997.
- Pons, Bruno (1996). Waddesdon Manor : architecture and panelling. London: Published for the Waddesdon Trust by Philip Wilson Publishers Ltd. ISBN 0-85667-437-0. OCLC 40492856.
- Soltau, Roger H. (1909). The Duke de Choiseul. Oxford: B.H. Blackwell.
- Watson, F. J. B. (1966). "Choiseul Boxes", pp. 141–158, reprint from Eighteenth Century Gold Boxes of Europe, edited by A. Kenneth Snowman. Boston Book and Art Shop. ISBN 9780571068005.

Attribution:

Political offices
Preceded by François-Joachim de Pierre de Bernis	Secretary of State for Foreign Affairs; 1758–1761	Succeeded by César Gabriel de Choiseul, duc de Praslin
Preceded by Charles Louis Auguste Fouquet de Belle-Isle	Secretary of State for War; 1761–1770	Succeeded by Louis François, marquis de Monteynard
Preceded by Nicolas René Berryer	Secretary of State for the Navy; 1761–1766	Succeeded by César Gabriel de Choiseul, duc de Praslin
Preceded by César Gabriel de Choiseul, duc de Praslin	Secretary of State for Foreign Affairs; 1766–1770	Succeeded by Louis Phélypeaux, duc de La Vrillière
