= Hôtel Crozat =

Parisian hôtel particulier

Coordinates: 48.87092°N 2.33873°E

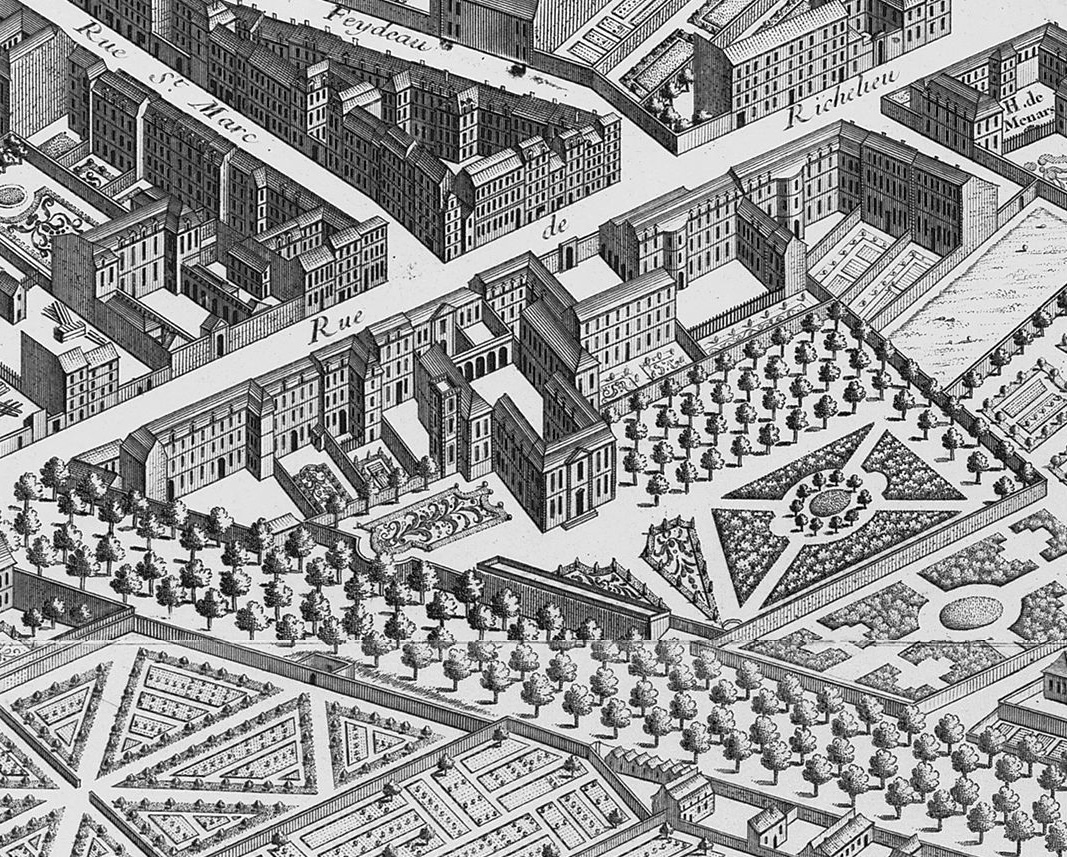
The Hôtel Crozat on the 1739 Turgot map of Paris

The Hôtel Crozat, later the Hôtel de Choiseul, was a Parisian hôtel particulier, constructed in 1704 to the designs of the French architect Jean-Sylvain Cartaud for the rich banker and art collector Pierre Crozat. It was located on the west side of the rue de Richelieu, south of its intersection with the Grand Boulevard (near today's 91 and 93 rue de Richelieu, between the rue d'Amboise and the rue Saint-Marc in the 2nd arrondissement of Paris). The Duke of Choiseul acquired the hôtel in 1750. It was demolished in 1780, the property subdivided, and a theatre, the Salle Favart, constructed in the former garden.

== Description ==
The street facade was of modest width, but the property widened considerably toward the rear. A forecourt preceded the entry court with the typical U-shaped plan of flanking wings and a central corps de logis at the western end. The house received plentiful light, since it projected into the garden with three exterior facades providing garden views to the north, west, and south.

The painter Jean-Antoine Watteau, whom Crozat generously supported, created four oval paintings depicting the Seasons for the dining room. Charles de La Fosse, who lived in the hôtel as a guest of Crozat's and died there in 1716, painted the vaulted ceiling with La Naissance de Minerve (The Birth of Minerva). As Crozat's house guest in 1715–16, the sculptor Pierre Le Gros the Younger decorated the cabinet in the hôtel as well as the chapel in Crozat's magnificent country retreat, the Château de Montmorency.

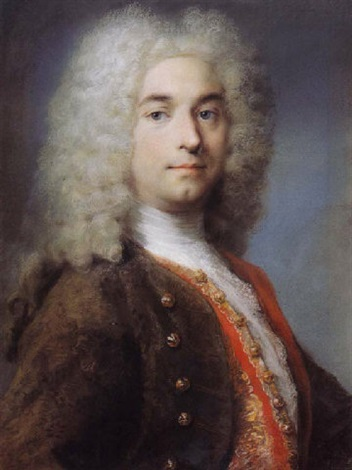
Possible portrait of Pierre Crozat by Rosalba Carriera

The artist Rosalba Carriera, whom Crozat met in Venice in 1715 during a trip to Italy, was a guest at the house in 1721.

The gallery on the west side of the main floor of the corps de logis had mirrors reflecting the garden like the Galerie des Glaces at Versailles. A fruit garden ran along the boulevard at the north, and there was a kitchen garden (jardin potager) on the other side of the boulevard, which Crozat at great expense had connected to the formal garden with a subterranean passage.

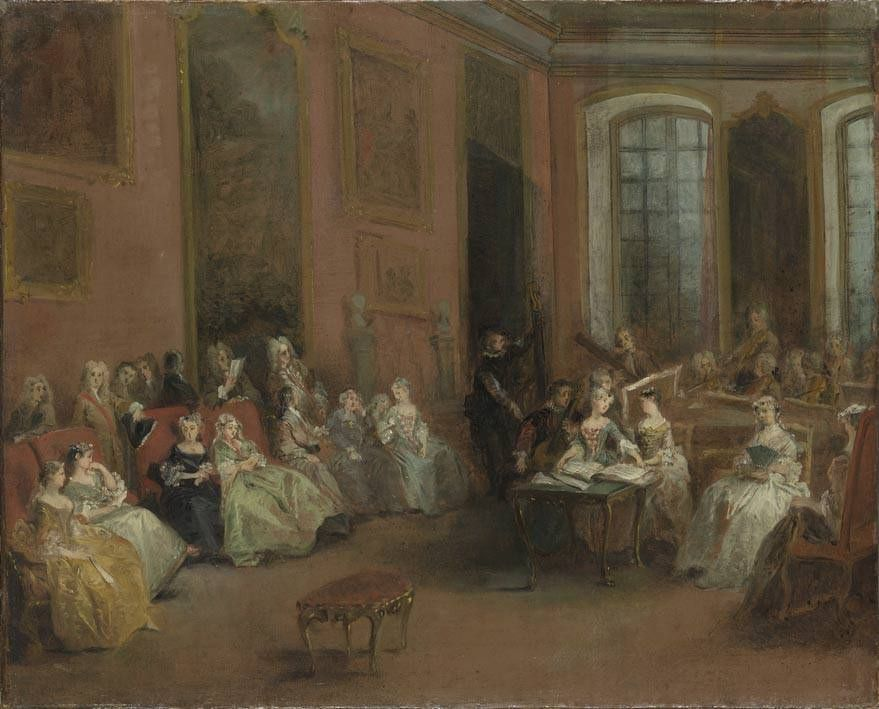
Concert in the Hôtel Crozat, c. 1720, painting by Nicolas Lancret (Alte Pinakothek, Munich)

Crozat's interest in the arts included music, and he held frequent concerts in his Paris home and in Montmorency. The artist Nicolas Lancret created an oil-on-canvas sketch of one of these famous concerts, held around 1720 in the Grande Galerie overlooking the garden. The performers included a female singer and ten male musicians, playing harpsichord, bassoon, six violins, double bass, and cello.

== Choiseul ==
Étienne François, duc de Choiseul, acquired the hôtel by his marriage in 1750 to Louise-Honorine Crozat, daughter of Louis-François Crozat, marquis du Châtel. Choiseul made numerous enhancements to the house until it became one of the most sumptuous in Paris. The interior was depicted by the miniaturist Louis-Nicolas Van Blarenberghe on the famous Choiseul snuffbox (c. 1770–1771). The walls were covered with rather simple wood panelling, most of which was installed under the Crozats, and the parquet floors were made from exotic woods. His hôtel housed a large collection of important paintings, consisting mainly of Dutch, Flemish, and French pictures, including eight works by Rembrandt. Italian paintings inherited by his wife from her father were displayed in the Grand Gallery at their country estate, the Château de Chanteloup.

== Miniatures from the Choiseul snuffbox ==
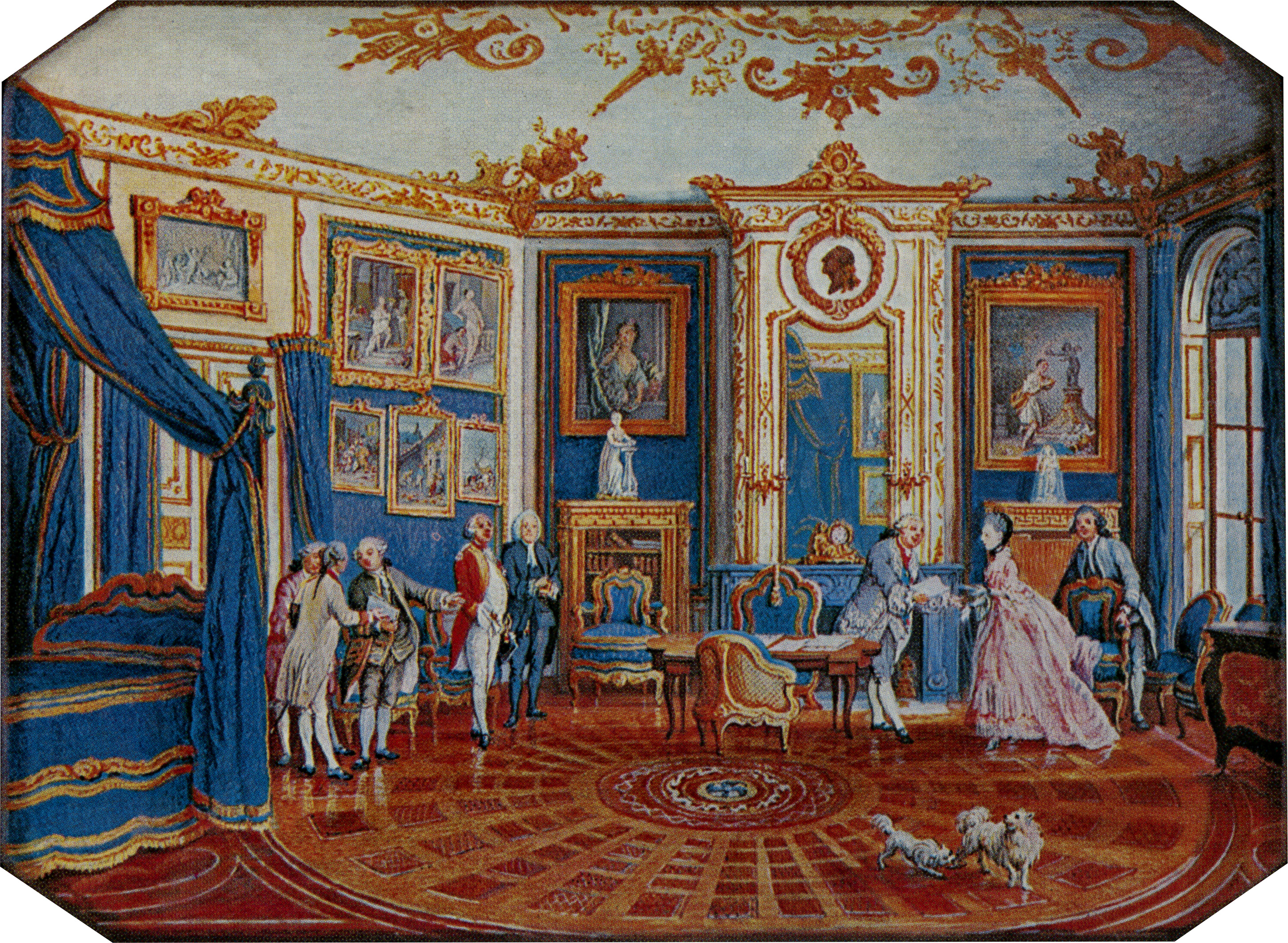
Bedchamber (snuffbox top)

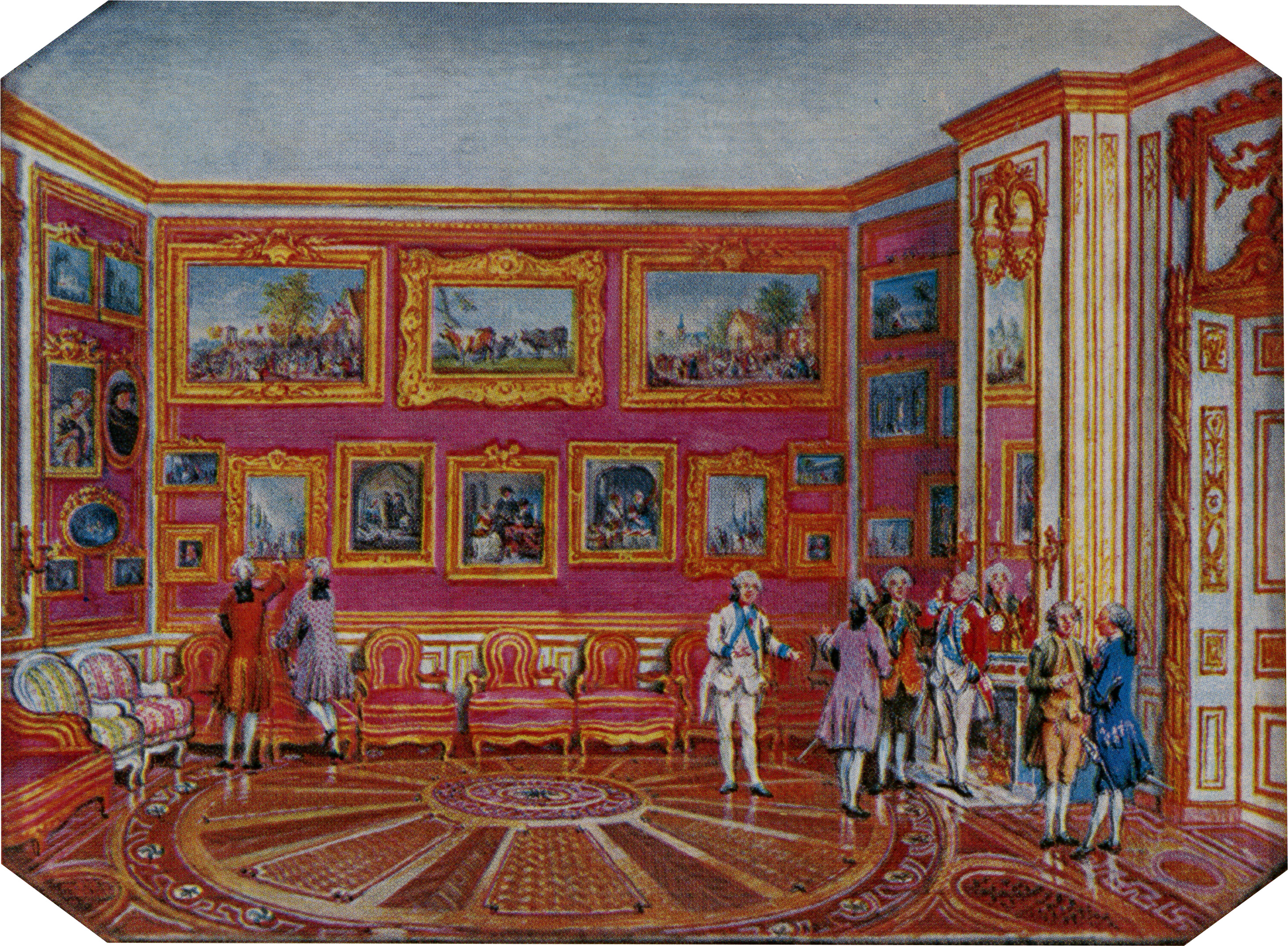
Premier Cabinet (snuffbox bottom)

== Salle Favart ==
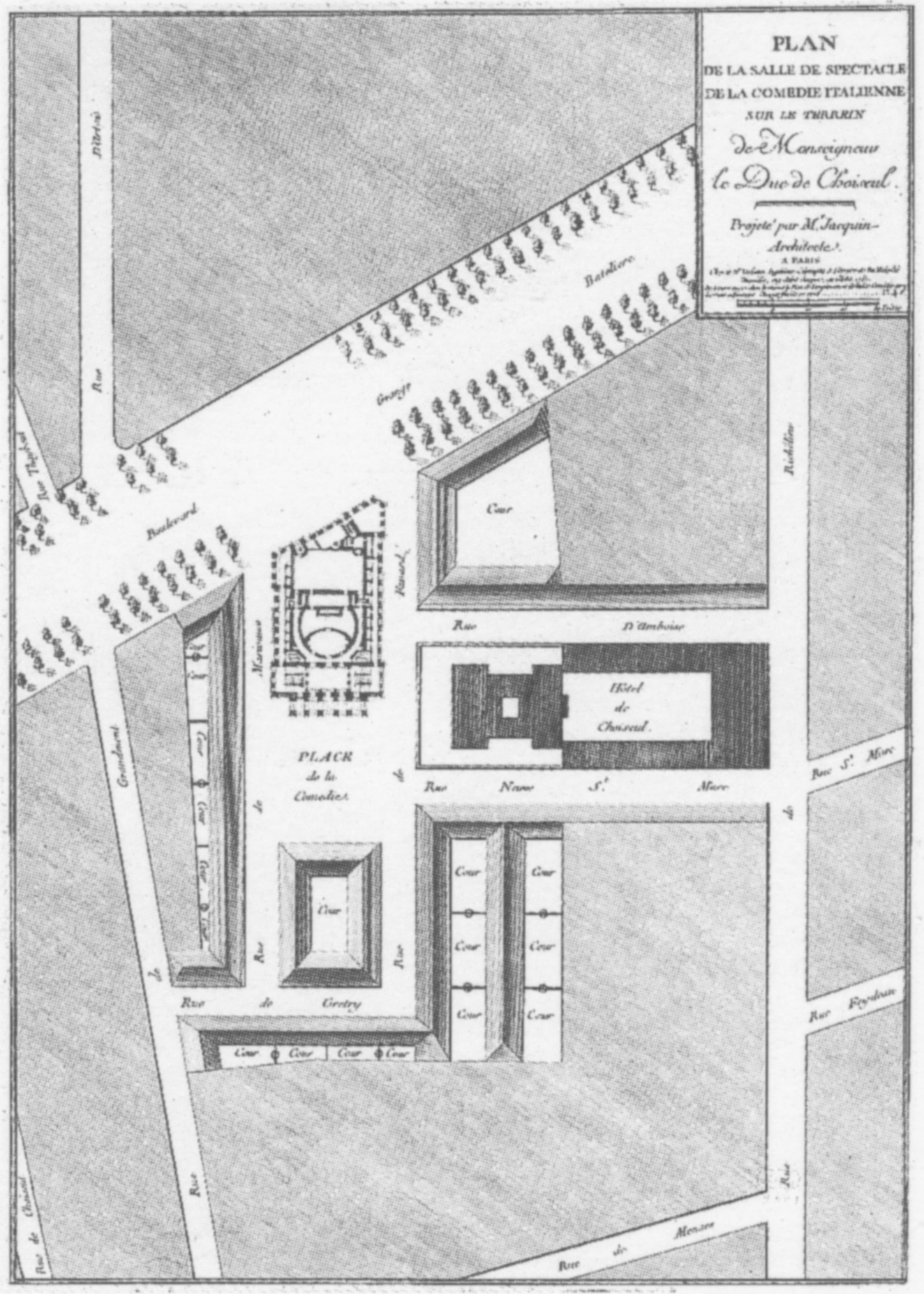
Site plan for a project by Jacquin (1781, unexecuted) for the theatre of the Opéra-Comique, now the site of the Salle Favart, showing the Hôtel de Choiseul between the rue d'Amboise on the north and the rue Neuve St. Marc on the south and a new wing closing off the former entrance court with an avant-corps facing the courtyard to its east

Around 1780, disgraced and in financial difficulty, Choiseul decided with the help of his banker friend, Jean-Joseph de Laborde, to subdivide his property for development. The garden, reaching the boulevard to the north and bordered on the south by the hôtel of the Duchess of Gramont Béatrix de Choiseul-Stainville, became the site of the Opéra-Comique's first Salle Favart, which opened in 1783.

== Bibliography ==
- Anonymous (1996). "Choiseul(-Stainville), Étienne-François, Duc de", vol. 7, pp. 193–195, in The Dictionary of Art (34 vols.), edited by Jane Turner. New York: Grove. ISBN 9781884446009. Also at Oxford Art Online, subscription required.
- Baetjer, Katharine, editor (2009). Watteau, Music, and Theater, to accompany the exhibition held 22 September to 29 November 2009. New York: The Metropolitan Museum of Art. ISBN 9780300155075.
- Chisholm, Hugh, editor (1911). "Choiseul, Étienne François", vol. 6, p. 261, in Encyclopædia Britannica, 11th edition. Cambridge, England: University Press.
- Fournier, Édouard (1855). Paris démoli, 2nd edition. Paris: Auguste Aubry. Copy at Google Books.
- Gallet, Michel (1995). Les Architectes parisiens du XVIIIe siècle. Paris: Mengès. ISBN 9782856203705.
- Hautecœur, Louis (1950). Histoire de L'Architecture classique en France. Tome III. Première moitié du XVIII^{e} Siècle. Le style Louis XV: Paris: A. et J. Picard. OCLC 1072135678.
- Leclair, Anne (1996). "Crozat family", vol. 8. pp. 208–210, in The Dictionary of Art (34 vols.), edited by Jane Turner. New York: Grove. ISBN 9781884446009. Also at Oxford Art Online, subscription required.
- Pons, Bruno (1996). Waddesdon Manor: Architecture and Panelling. London: Philip Wilson. ISBN 9780856674372.
- Watson, F. J. B. (1966). "Choiseul Boxes", pp. 141–158, reprint from Eighteenth Century Gold Boxes of Europe, edited by A. Kenneth Snowman. Boston Book and Art Shop. ISBN 9780571068005.
- Wild, Nicole ([1989]). Dictionnaire des théâtres parisiens au XIXe siècle: les théâtres et la musique. Paris: Aux Amateurs de livres. ISBN 9780828825863. ISBN 9782905053800 (paperback).View formats and editions at WorldCat.
