= Crozat =

Crozat (English: /kroʊˈzɑː/, French: [kʁoza]) is a French surname. Notable people with the surname include:

- Antoine Crozat (1655–1738), French merchant, the first proprietary owner of French Louisiana
- Pierre Crozat (1661–1740), French art collector
