= Louise Honorine Crozat =

- Duchess of Choiseul
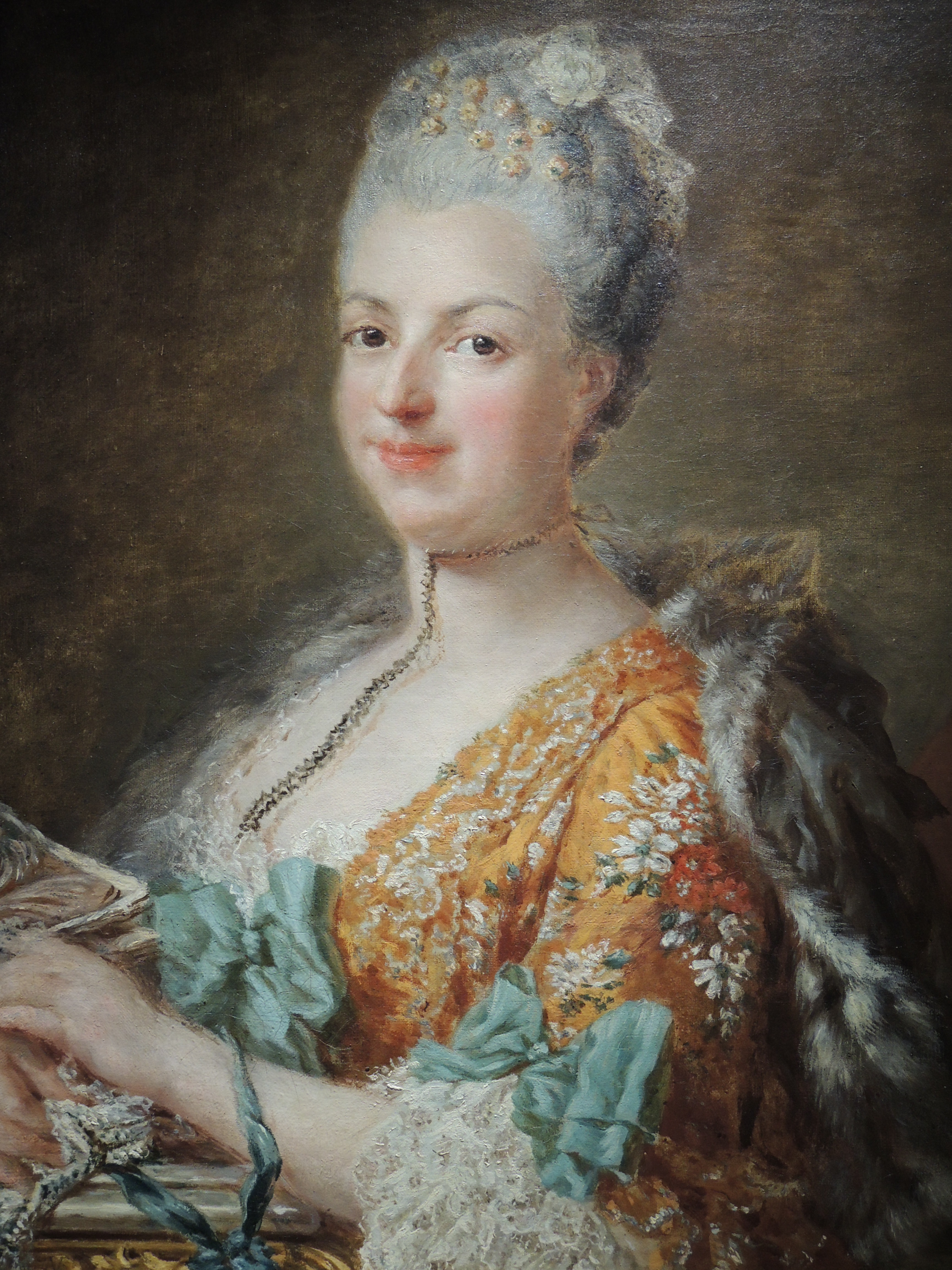
- Portrait by Anna Dorothea Therbusch
- Full name: Louise Honorine Crozat
- Born: 1734 hôtel du Châtel, Rue de Richelieu, Paris, France
- Died: 1801 (aged 64); Rue Saint-Dominique, Paris
- Buried: Cimetière des Ursulines, Amboise
- Noble family: Choiseul
- Spouse: Étienne François, duc de Choiseul (m. 1750; d. 1785)
- Father: Louis François Crozat, 2nd Marquis of Châtel
- Mother: Marie Thérèse Catherine de Gouffier

Louise Honorine Crozat (1734–1801) was the duchess of Choiseul as the wife of Étienne François. She was the heiress of the grand fortune left by her grandfather Antoine Crozat.

== Life ==
Louise Honorine Crozat was the daughter of Louis François Crozart—the son of proprietary owner Antoine Crozat. At the age of 12, Louise-Honorine was betrothed to Étienne François, and the two married in 1750. The marriage was described as a happy one, despite Étienne's many liaisons.

Louise Honorine was described as being tender-hearted and dignified, and as a devoted wife. Her kind demeanor caused Horace Walpole to claim:

"The most perfect being of either sex. Nothing that I ever saw anywhere was like the Duchess of Choiseul, who has more parts, reason and agreeableness than I ever met in such a delicate little creature. You would take her for the Queen of an Allegory."

During the French Revolution, Louise Honorine was held captive in 1794, awaiting her death by guillotine in the Conciergerie; before her execution, however, the party of Robespierre fell and she was then let free. She would later die in 1801, aged 66–67, outliving her husband, whom had died in 1785, by nearly 16 years.

She was buried in the Cimetière d'Amboise, in France.
