= Nicolas René Berryer =

French politician (1703–1762)

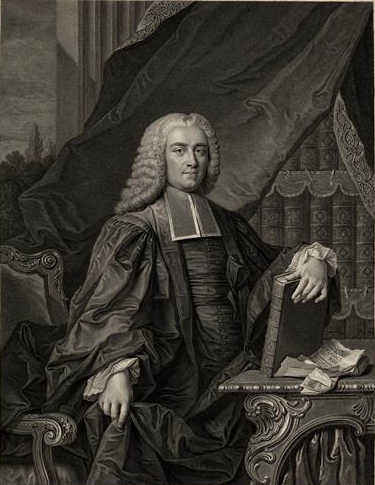
Portrait of Berryer

Nicolas René Berryer, comte de La Ferrière (4 March 1703 – 15 August 1762) was a French politician who served as Secretary of State for the Navy from 1758 to 1761.

== Life ==
Nicolas René Berryer was the son of Nicolas Berryer, procureur général to the Grand Conseil, and Élisabeth Nicole Ursule d'Arnollet de Lochefontaine. Initially "avocat général aux requêtes de l'hôtel", in 1728 he became "avocat général des brevets" then, in 1731, "conseiller à la cinquième chambre des enquêtes du Parlement de Paris".

In 1738, he married a rich heiress, the daughter of the fermier général, Catherine Madeleine Jorts de Fribois : beautiful, likeable and witty, she contributed to her husband's advancement. In 1739, he became maître des requêtes then président of the Grand Conseil before being named intendant of Poitou (1743–1747).

A friend of Madame de Pompadour, it was she who had him named lieutenant général de police when she became "maîtresse en titre" to Louis XV. He held this role from May 1747 to October 1757. Charged with protecting the relations between the king and de Pompadour, he created a "cabinet noir" (black cabinet), in order to keep postal correspondence between their enemies under surveillance. To this cabinet has been attributed the disgrace of several enemies of madame de Pompadour, notably the comte de Maurepas and the comte d'Argenson. On the other hand, he revealed himself unable to identify the authors of heinous libels against de Pompadour.

According to Tocqueville, Berryer was "a hard, haughty, cruel man, with much ignorance and even more presumption and stubbornness" ("un homme dur, hautain, grossier, avec beaucoup d'ignorance et encore plus de présomption et d'entêtement"). His brutality won him the hatred of the people of Paris. One day, when he was summoned to parliament by the first-president, Berryer reported back that he could not cross Paris, for the mob had sworn to kill him and eat his heart.

On 1 November 1758, while still under the protection of Madame de Pompadour, and with the support of Choiseul and the marshal of Belle Isle, he was named secretary of state to the Navy. Delegating the planning of the landing in England to the secretary of state for war, he devoted himself to reforming the administration. He was instrumental in blocking the plans of Belle-Isle, his former patron, to launch an invasion of the Channel Islands. With his customary brutality, he strove to repress the abuses that he believed he saw in the administration of Canada. He worked to set up a court of enquiry that would have been competent to rule on the accusations of fraud and price increases made against his department, and in this way to punish the concessionnaires, implicated in the embezzlements and other irregularities in Canada.

On 13 October 1761, Louis XV replaced Berryer with Choiseul and, to keep him in royal service, named him garde des sceaux of France, a role he occupied until 15 September 1762.

He had only one child, a daughter called Marie Élisabeth Berryer, who married Chrétien François de Lamoignon de Basville (garde des sceaux from 1787) on 4 September 1758.

== Bibliography ==
- McLynn, Frank. 1759: The Year Britain Became Master of the World. Pimlico, 2005
