= Self-Portrait on an Easel =

Painting by Annibale Carracci

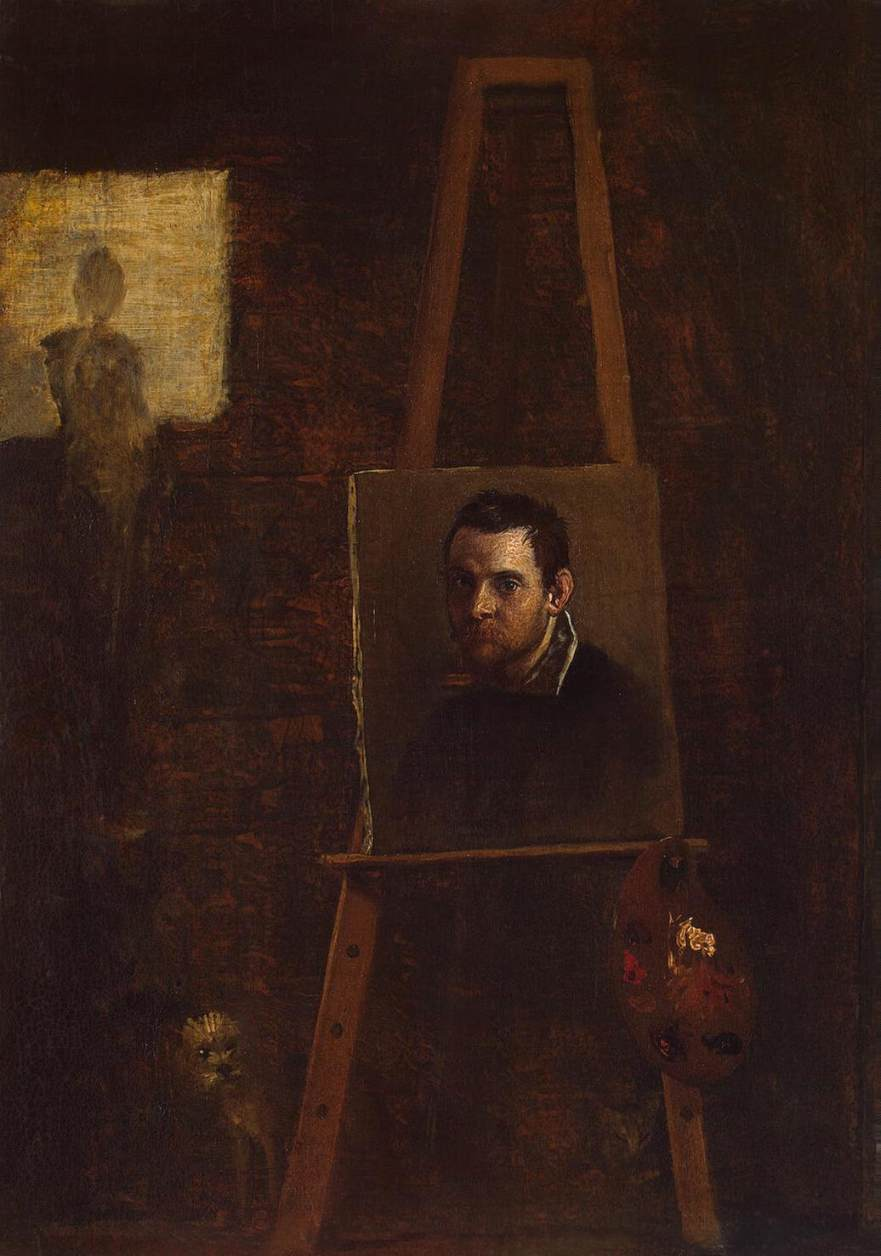
Self-portrait at the Easel (1603–1604) by Annibale Carracci

Self-Portrait on an Easel is a 1603–1604 oil on panel painting by the Italian artist Annibale Carracci, now displayed in Room 231 of the New Hermitage Building of the Hermitage Museum in Saint Petersburg (inv. GE-148). The portrait from the work was repeated for an autograph self-portrait now in the Uffizi, whilst a 1595 version of the Hermitage work is also in the Uffizi.

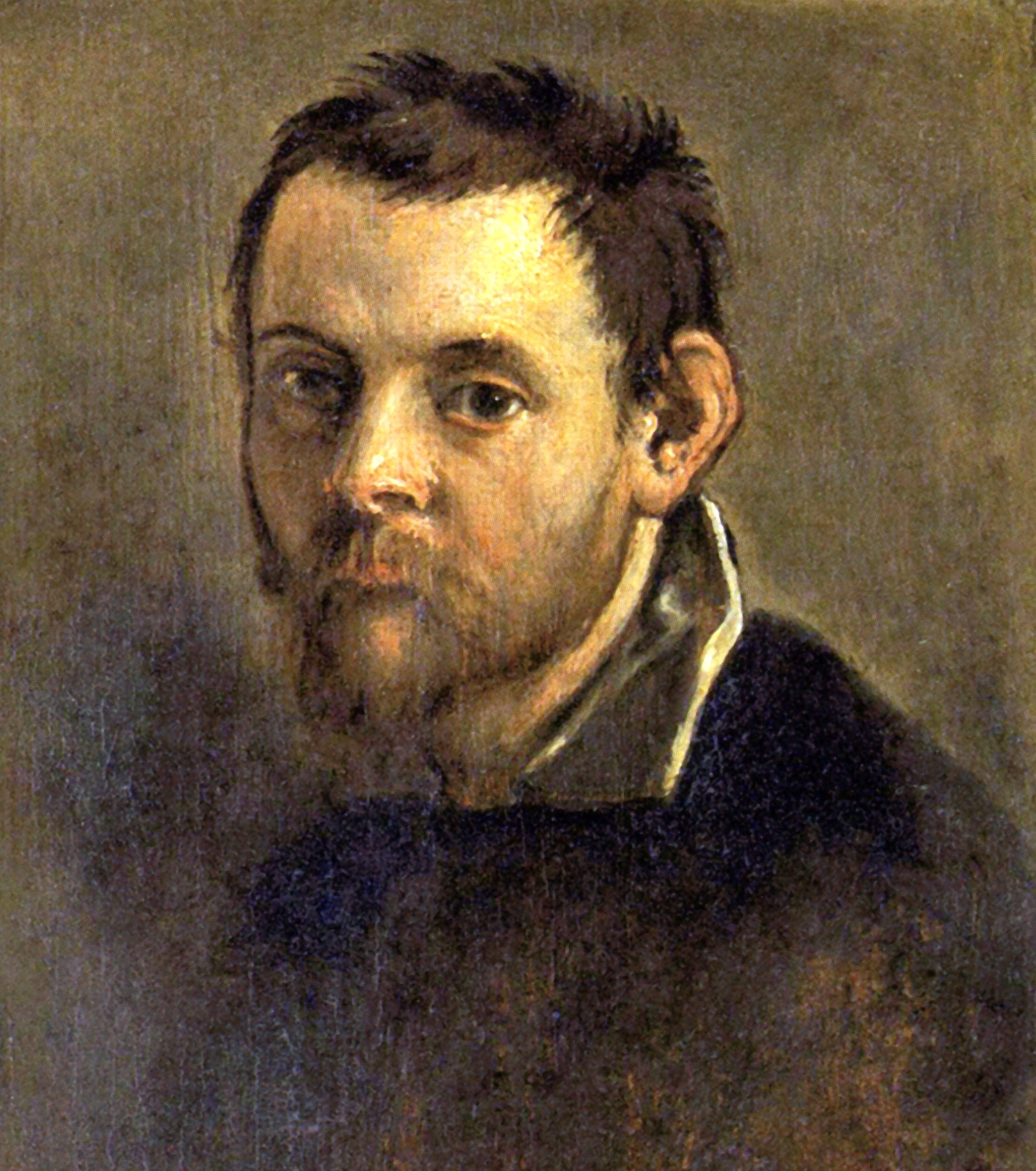
The Uffizi work

It shows a self-portrait of the artist resting on an easel, with a palette hanging from the easel, a dog and a cat behind the easel's legs and a woman's silhouette in front of a window at the top left hand corner. An initial underdrawing for the work is visible to the naked eye, showing that the original intention was for the portrait to occupy the whole panel. A sketch for the work (ca. 1603–1605, Royal Collection, Windsor Castle) shows that option for the work as well as that used in the final version, though the painting made several amendments to the background planned in the second half of the drawing.

The Hermitage Museum's 1958 catalogue dated the work to the 1590s, whilst Denis Mahon argued for around 1595 and others for around 1604. During its loan to Italy in 2006 the Hermitage and Uffizi experts carried out a joint study, comparing the work to the Uffizi self-portrait and arriving at a conclusive date of 1603–1604 (the same as the Windsor drawing).

The work's early history is unclear, though it was inventoried as being in the Crozat collection in 1740, with a misattribution to Tintoretto that was corrected by the time of another inventory in 1755. It was acquired by Catherine II of Russia in 1772, placing it in its present home.
