= Encyclopedia of Aesthetics =

Art encyclopedia by Oxford University Press

Encyclopedia of Aesthetics, published in 1998 by Oxford University Press, is an encyclopedia that covers philosophical, historical, sociological, and biographical aspects of Art and Aesthetics worldwide. The second edition (2014) is now available online as part of Oxford Art Online.

== Information ==
Many prominent aesthetics scholars contributed. The encyclopedia aimed to provide "a genealogy of aesthetics sufficient to integrate its philosophical and cultural roles, and that it contributes to a discursive public sphere in which multiple perspectives are articulated, dialogue fostered, and common ground constructed."

The Encyclopedia of Aesthetics is considered to be the first reference work to survey artistic theory and art history from classical philosophy to contemporary critical theory, featuring over 600 articles that focus on many topics of art history including painting, sculpture, and the artistic and cultural aesthetics of world nations.

The only comparable work is 25 years older: The Dictionary of the History of Ideas: Studies of Selected Pivotal Ideas (New York, NY: Scribner, 1973–74), which had articles on aesthetics and other key topics, written from an interdisciplinary approach. There are other contemporary works that deal with the aesthetics universe, but "from within their respective disciplinary frameworks"; they are: The Dictionary of Art (New York, NY: Grove's Dictionaries, 1996) and Routledge Encyclopedia of Philosophy (London, England: Routledge, 1998).

The Encyclopedia was written from a comparative perspective, with the traditions of non western societies in view, and re-thought the critical assumptions of western aesthetics. Examples of such perspective are the entries: grotesque; Black Aesthetic, African Aesthetics, Caribbean Aesthetics, Chinese Aesthetics, Indian Aesthetics, Japanese Aesthetics, Islamic Aesthetics, Latin American Aesthetics; Tribal art; Jokes, Camp, Play; Anti-art, Situationist Aesthetics; Gay Aesthetics, Lesbian Aesthetics; Law and Art, Moral Rights of Arts, Cultural Property, Obscenity, Politics and Aesthetics, Morality and Aesthetics. The longest entry, 35 pages, is for Immanuel Kant.
