= Antoine Crozat, 1st Marquis of Châtel =

French financier (c. 1655–1738)

Antoine Crozat,
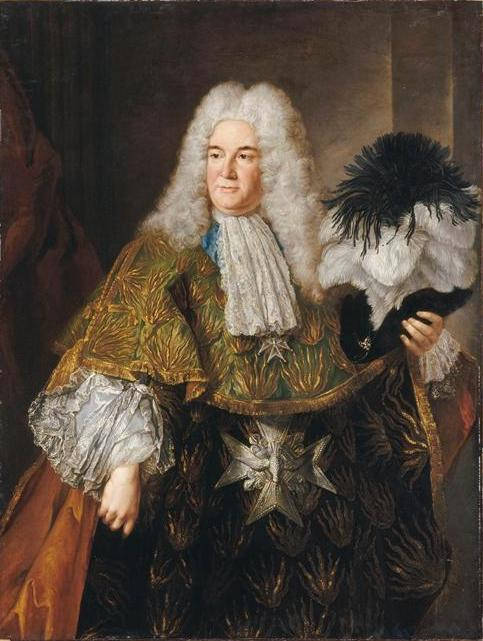
- Antoine Crozat, marquis du Châtel
- Born: 1655
- Died: 7 June 1738 (aged 82–83)
- Occupation: Owner of French Louisiana

Antoine Crozat, 1st Marquis of Châtel (English: /kroʊˈzɑː/ kroh-ZAH, French: [ɑ̃twan kʁoza]; c. 1655 – 7 June 1738), French founder of an immense fortune, was the first proprietary owner of French Louisiana, from 1712 to 1717.

== Career ==
Antoine Crozat and his brother Pierre Crozat were born in Toulouse, France, the sons of a wealthy banking family. They moved to Paris around 1700 and rose from obscurity to become two of the wealthiest financiers of France. By way of lending money to the government, Antoine was ennobled as the Marquis du Châtel, a title he transmitted to his eldest son Louis-François. He became a financial counselor to Louis XIV. He invested in the Guinea Company and the Asiento Company, two lucrative overseas franchises involved in the slave trade. The king eventually offered him a 15‑year trade monopoly in Louisiana. Crozat's term running and influencing Louisiana was quite unpopular with the settlers, and Crozat ceded the monopoly only 5 years into the 15-year term. As Crozat left, he claimed that tobacco could be grown in Louisiana. The monopoly was transferred to the Scottish economist and businessman John Law in 1717 under a group called the Company of the West (Compagnie d'Occident).

== Personal life ==
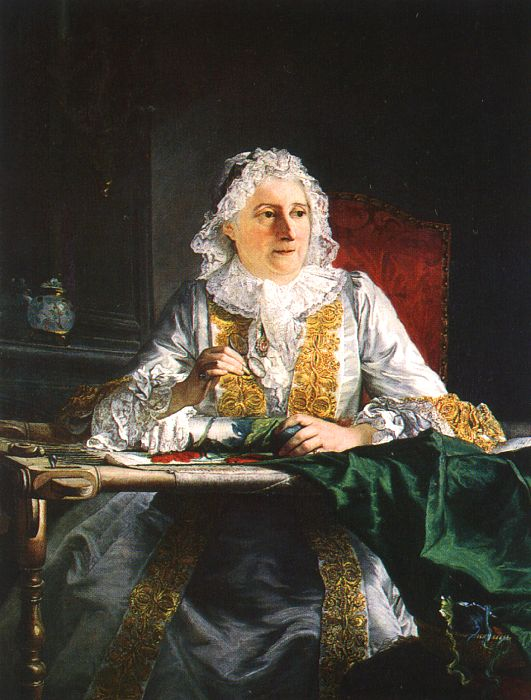
Portrait of Mme Crozat by Joseph Aved (exhibited at the Salon of 1741), Montpellier, Musée Fabre

In 1690 Antoine Crozat married Marguerite Legendre (1670–1742). They had four children.

1. Louis François Crozat, 2nd Marquis of Châtel (1691–1750), who inherited his uncle Pierre's collection of paintings and his hôtel in the Rue de Richelieu
2. Marie Anne Crozat (1695–1729), who married the Count of Évreux, Louis Henri de La Tour d'Auvergne, son of Godefroy Maurice de La Tour d'Auvergne and Marie Anne Mancini
3. Joseph Antoine Crozat, Marquis of Thugny (1696–1751)
4. Louis Antoine Crozat, Baron of Thiers (1699–1770), whose collection of paintings, inherited from his eldest brother Louis-François and his other brother Joseph-Antoine (mostly Dutch pictures), was purchased after his death for the collection of Catherine II of Russia, through Denis Diderot. Most now hang in the Hermitage Museum in Saint Petersburg, although a few were sold in the 1920s and 1930s by the Soviet authorities for hard currency, including a dozen purchased by Andrew Mellon, now in the National Gallery of Art in Washington, DC.

In 1708 Antoine Crozat built a notable hôtel particulier on the Place Vendôme to the designs of the architect Pierre Bullet. It became part of the Hôtel Ritz Paris in 1910.

== Bibliography ==
- Gady, Alexandre (2008). Les Hôtels particuliers de Paris du Moyen Âge à la Belle Époque. Paris: Parigramme. ISBN 9782840962137.
- Leclair, Anne (1996). "Crozat family", vol. 8. pp. 208–210, in The Dictionary of Art (34 vols.), edited by Jane Turner. New York: Grove. ISBN 9781884446009. Also at Oxford Art Online, subscription required.
