= Grove Art Online =

Online art encyclopedia; part of Oxford Art Online

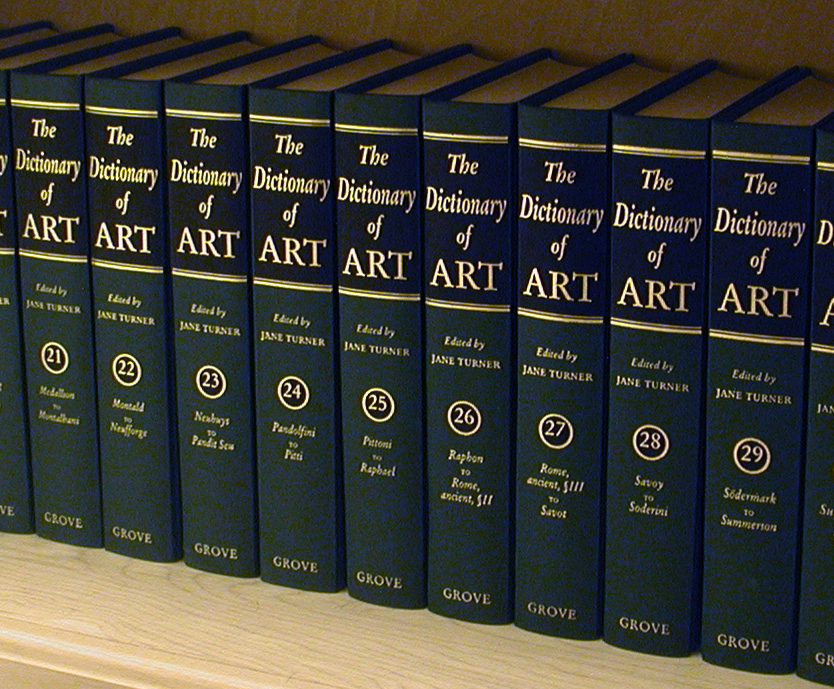
The Dictionary of Art

Grove Art Online is the online edition of The Dictionary of Art, often referred to as the Grove Dictionary of Art, and part of Oxford Art Online, an internet gateway to online art reference publications of Oxford University Press, which also includes the online version of the Benezit Dictionary of Artists. It is a large encyclopedia of art, previously a 34-volume printed encyclopedia first published by Grove in 1996 and reprinted with minor corrections in 1998. A new edition was published in 2003 by Oxford University Press.

== Scope ==
Written by 6,700 experts from around the world, its 32,600 pages cover over 45,000 topics about art, artists, art critics, art collectors, or anything else connected to the world of art. According to The New York Times Book Review it is the "most ambitious art-publishing venture of the late 20th century". Almost half the content covers non-Western subjects, and contributors hail from 120 countries. Topics range from Julia Margaret Cameron to Shoji Hamada, Korea to Timbuktu, the Enlightenment to Marxism, and Yoruba masks to Abstract Expressionism. Entries include bibliographies and a vast number of images.

== Print editions ==
The dictionary is still available in a standard hardcover edition, though the leather-bound version appears to be out of print.

Various smaller specialized redactions have been published, such as The Grove Encyclopedia of Decorative Arts, (Editor, Gordon Campbell, OUP 2006, ISBN 0195189485), The Grove Dictionary of Materials and Techniques in Art (OUP 2008, ISBN 978-0-19-531391-8), From David to Ingres: Early 19th-Century French Artists (Grove Dictionary of Art) and so on.

The Grove Dictionary of Art is published by Oxford University Press, who acquired it from Macmillan Publishers in 2003.

== Online edition ==
The Dictionary of Art was first offered online on 12 November 1998 by Grove Dictionaries (New York) under the title The Grove Dictionary of Art Online. The online version is now published by Oxford University Press, is updated three times a year, is available by subscription and includes some extra content. In the UK, many public libraries offer it free to their online users using their library membership number and a PIN to log in. An umbrella site, Oxford Art Online, also includes the Benezit Dictionary of Artists and other art reference works: The Oxford Companion to Western Art, the Encyclopedia of Aesthetics, and The Concise Oxford Dictionary of Art Terms.

== See also ==
- The New Grove Dictionary of Music and Musicians

== References and sources ==
Sources

- Jane Turner (Editor). The Dictionary of Art. 1996. ISBN 1-884446-00-0
