= Pierre Crozat =

French financier, art patron and collector (1665–1740)

- Pierre Crozat
- Born: 14 March 1665; Toulouse, France
- Died: 23 May 1740 (aged 75); Paris, France
- Occupations: Banker, art collector and patron

Pierre Crozat (Note: English: /kroʊˈzɑː/ kroh-ZAH, French: [pjɛʁ kʁoza]) (14 March 1665 – 23 May 1740) was a French financier, art patron and collector at the center of a broad circle of cognoscenti; he was the brother of Antoine Crozat.

== Biography ==
The brothers Crozat were born in Toulouse, Languedoc, France, the sons of a wealthy banking family. They moved to Paris around 1700 and rose from obscurity to become two of the wealthiest financiers of France. Pierre was known as Crozat le pauvre, to distinguish him from his even-wealthier brother.

Pierre Crozat was one of the most prominent French financiers and collectors, becoming the treasurer to the king in Paris in 1704, when he built the Hôtel Crozat on the rue de Richelieu and his magnificent country retreat, the Château de Montmorency.

From 1714 until the purchase was finally concluded in 1721, he worked as agent and negotiator for the Regent, Philippe II, Duke of Orléans, on the purchase in Rome of the art collection of Queen Christina of Sweden for the Orleans Collection. His friend, the sculptor Pierre Le Gros the Younger who was living in Rome, acted as a go-between in the negotiations until his death in 1719.

== Patron of the arts ==
Charles de La Fosse, who lived in Crozat's Parisian hôtel as his guest and died there in 1716, painted the vaulted ceiling there with La Naissance de Minerve (The Birth of Minerva) and delivered several paintings for Montmorency. As Crozat's house guest in 1715–16, Le Gros decorated a cabinet in the hôtel as well as the chapel in Montmorency. Antoine Watteau, of whom Crozat was the principal patron, painted a cycle of the Four Seasons for his Parisian dining room.

== Collector ==
Crozat began gradually to acquire a notable collection of paintings, old master drawings, and objets d'art, sometimes referred to as the "Cabinet Crozat". His collection of old master drawings was already one of the most important in France at the beginning of the 18th century. Among his paintings was Annibale Carracci's Self-Portrait on an Easel.

Between 1729 and 1742, a finely-illustrated, two-volume work was published, known as the "Recueil Crozat", including reproductive prints of some of the finest paintings and drawings in French collections. Many of his old master drawings, catalogued by Pierre-Jean Mariette, one of the four acknowledged expert connoisseurs in Paris, were dispersed at auction in Paris in 1741. That occasion was termed by Michael Jaffé as "the greatest public sale of drawings held in the dix-huitième."

Most of Crozat's treasures were inherited by his nephews, Louis François (d. 1750), Joseph Antoine (d. 1750), and Louis Antoine (d. 1770), who added to the collection. The works of art were dispersed after the nephews' deaths. Louis Antoine Crozat's collection was bought in 1772, through Denis Diderot and Vasiliy Rudanovsky, by Catherine II of Russia and went to the Hermitage Museum in Saint Petersburg.

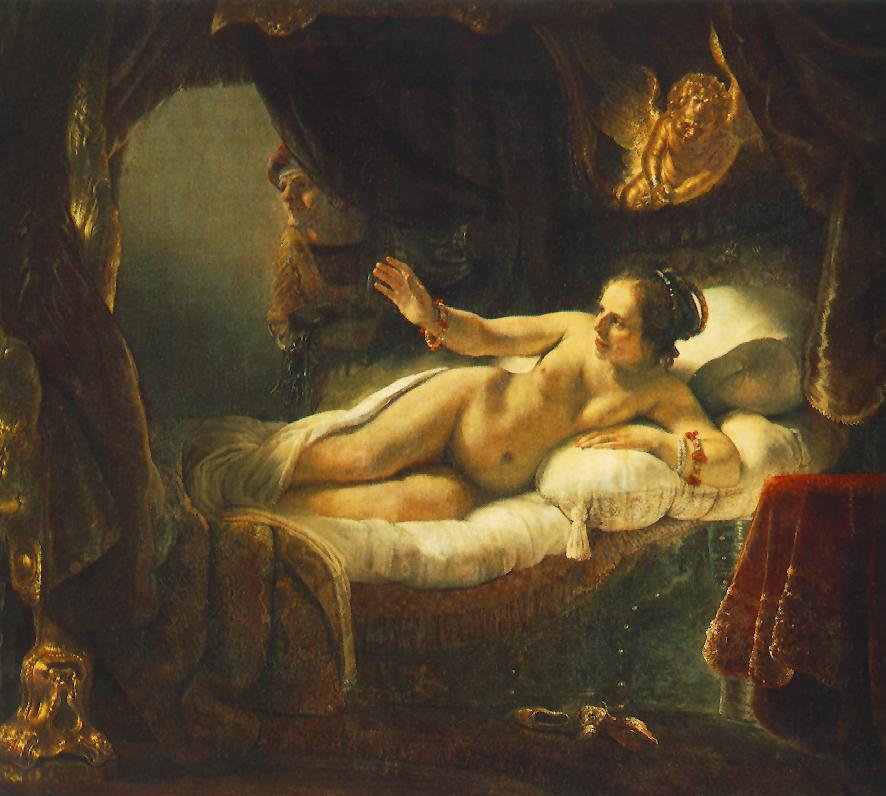
Rembrandt's painting Danae from Crozat's collection

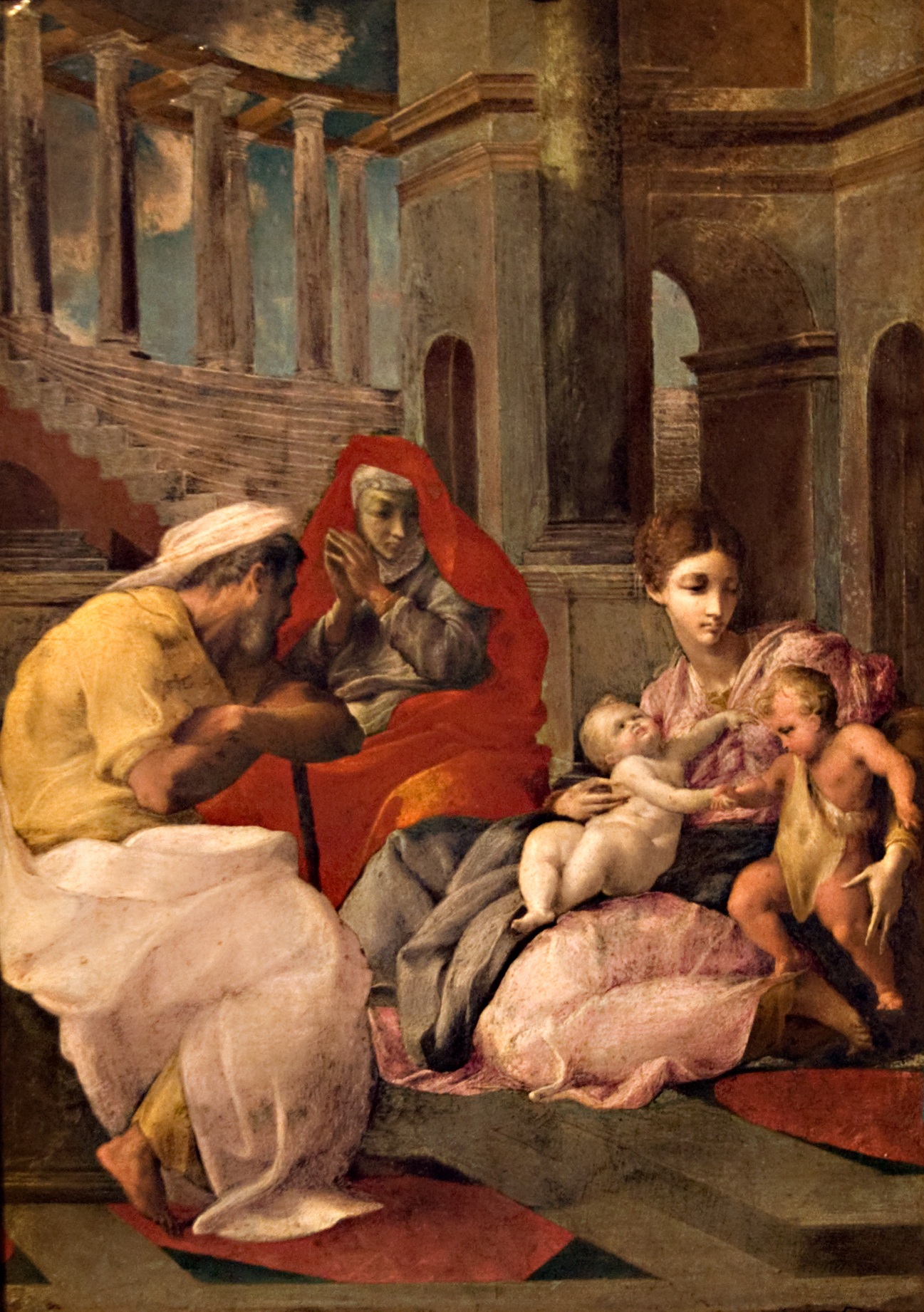
Primaticcio's Holy Family was purchased for Catherine (Hermitage Museum)

== See also ==
- Category:Crozat collection
