= 18th-century French art =

18th-century French art was dominated by the Baroque, Rococo and neoclassical movements.

== History ==
In France, the death of Louis XIV in September 1715 led to a period of licentious freedom commonly called the Régence. The heir to Louis XIV, his great-grandson Louis XV, was only 5 years old; for the next seven years France was ruled by the regent Philippe II, Duke of Orléans. Versailles was abandoned from 1715 to 1722. Painting turned toward "fêtes galantes", theater settings and the female nude. Painters from this period include Antoine Watteau, Nicolas Lancret, and François Boucher.

The Louis XV style of decoration (although already apparent at the end of the last reign) was lighter: pastels and wood panels, smaller rooms, less gilding and fewer brocades; shells and garlands and occasional Chinese subjects predominated. Rooms were more intimate. After the return to Versailles, many of the baroque rooms of Louis XIV were redesigned. The official etiquette was also simplified and the notion of privacy was expanded: the king himself retreated from the official bed at night and conversed in private with his mistress.

The latter half of the 18th century continued to see French preeminence in Europe, particularly through the arts and sciences, and the French language was the lingua franca of the European courts. The French academic system continued to produce artists, but some, like Jean-Honoré Fragonard and Jean-Baptiste-Siméon Chardin, explored new and increasingly impressionist styles of painting with thick brushwork. Although the hierarchy of genres continued to be respected officially, genre painting, landscape, portrait and still life were extremely fashionable.

The writer Denis Diderot wrote a number of times on the annual Salons of the Académie of painting and sculpture and his comments and criticisms are a vital document on the arts of this period.

One of Diderot's favorite painters was Jean-Baptiste Greuze. Although often considered kitsch by today's standards, his paintings of domestic scenes reveal the importance of Sentimentalism in the European arts of the period (as also seen in the works of Jean-Jacques Rousseau and Samuel Richardson.)

One also finds in this period a kind of Pre-romanticism. Hubert Robert's images of ruins, inspired by Italian capriccio paintings, are typical in this respect. So too the change from the rational and geometrical French garden (of André Le Nôtre) to the English garden, which emphasized (artificially) wild and irrational nature. One also finds in some of these gardens curious ruins of temples called follies.

The middle of the 18th century saw a turn to Neoclassicism in France, that is to say a conscious use of Greek and Roman forms and iconography. In painting, the greatest representative of this style is Jacques-Louis David who, mirroring the profiles of Greek vases, emphasized the use of the profile; his subject matter often involved classical history (the death of Socrates, Brutus). The dignity and subject matter of his paintings were greatly inspired by Nicolas Poussin in the 17th century.

The Louis XVI style of furniture (once again already present in the previous reign) tended toward circles and ovals in chair backs; chair legs were grooved; Greek inspired iconography was used as decoration.

== Neoclassicism ==
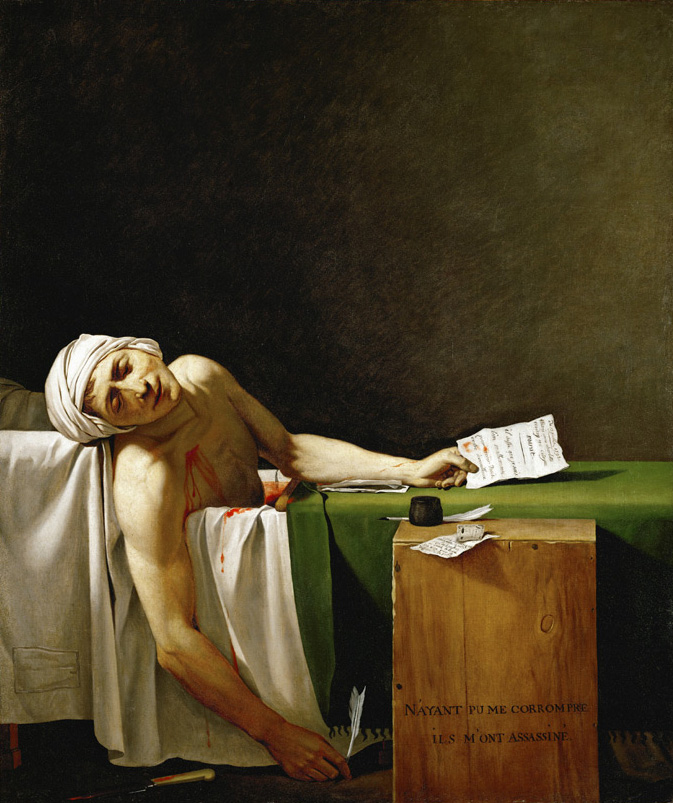
The Death of Marat by Jacques-Louis David (1793)

French neoclassicism would greatly contribute to the monumentalism of the French Revolution, as typified in the structures La Madeleine church (begun in 1763 and finished in 1840) which is in the form of a Greek temple and the mammoth Panthéon (1764–1812) which today houses the tombs of great Frenchmen. The rationalism and simplicity of classical architecture was seen — in the Age of Enlightenment — as the antithesis of the backward-looking Gothic.

The Greek and Roman subject matters were also often chosen to promote the values of republicanism. One also finds paintings glorifying the heroes and martyrs of the French revolution, such as David's painting of the assassination of Jean-Paul Marat.

Jean Auguste Dominique Ingres, a student of David's who was also influenced by Raphael and John Flaxman, would maintain the precision of David's style, while also exploring other mythological (Oedipus and the sphinx, Jupiter and Thetis) and oriental (the Odalesques) subjects in the spirit of Romanticism.

== See also ==
- Neoclassicism in France
- French neoclassical theatre
- List of French artists of the eighteenth century
- Louis XVI style
- Louis XV furniture
- Louis XVI furniture
- Wallace Collection, a free national gallery in London, one of the best places in the UK to see examples of French visual and decorative arts of the Rococo and neoclassical periods.
