= Oxford Art Online =

Gateway to Oxford University Press art history

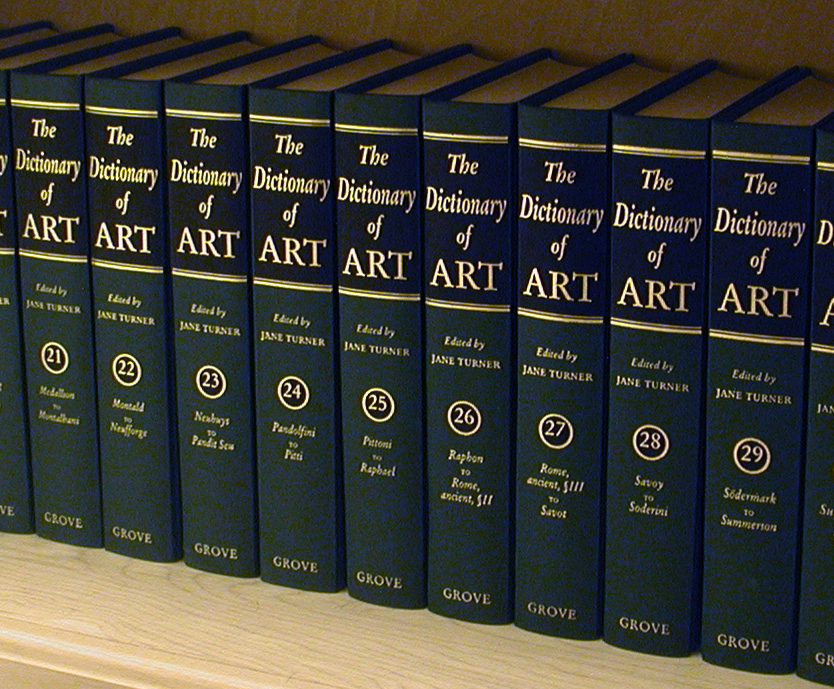
Several volumes of The Dictionary of Art published by Grove Dictionaries, New York, 1998 reprint

Oxford Art Online is an Oxford University Press online gateway into art research, which was launched in 2008. It provides access to several online art reference works, including Grove Art Online (originally published in 1996 in a print version, The Dictionary of Art), the online version of the Benezit Dictionary of Artists, and The Oxford Companion to Western Art. It also provides access to other Oxford art reference works, including the Encyclopedia of Aesthetics (2nd edition), and The Concise Oxford Dictionary of Art Terms. The site was updated on 1 December 2017 to enhance page design, search tools, linking, and media capabilities.
