= Oloron-Sainte-Marie =

Subprefecture of Pyrénées-Atlantiques, Nouvelle-Aquitaine

Oloron-Sainte-Marie Auloron e Senta Maria (Occitan)
- Subprefecture and commune
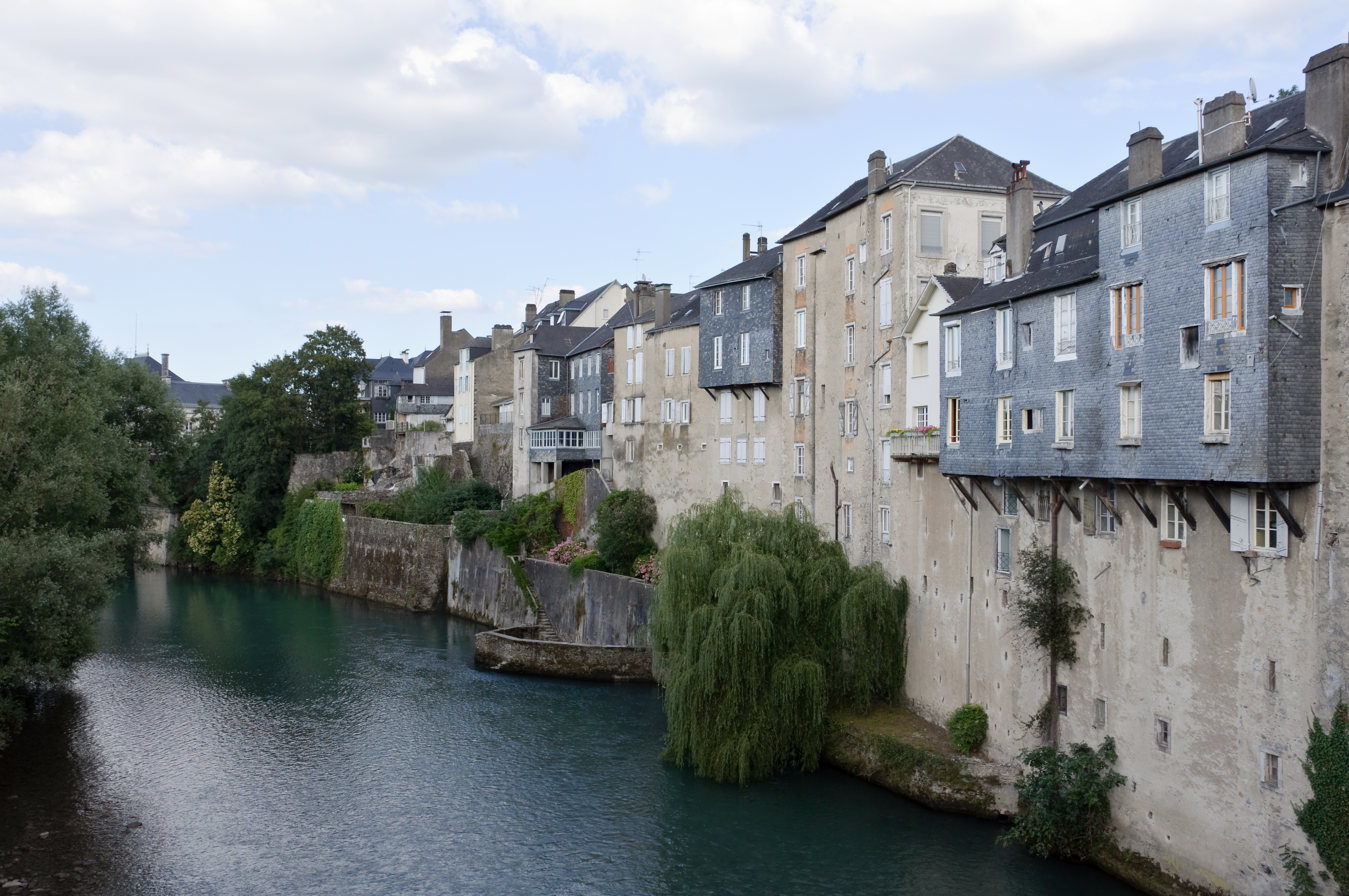
- Houses along the 'gave d'Aspe', before its junction with the 'gave d'Ossau' to make the 'gave d'Oloron'

- Coat of arms
- Location of Oloron-Sainte-Marie
- Location within France Location within Nouvelle-Aquitaine
- Coordinates: 43°11′41″N 0°36′20″W
- Country: France
- Region: Nouvelle-Aquitaine
- Department: Pyrénées-Atlantiques
- Arrondissement: Oloron-Sainte-Marie
- Canton: Oloron-Sainte-Marie-1 and 2
- Intercommunality: Haut Béarn

Government
  - Mayor (2020–2026): Bernard Uthurry
- Area^{1}: 68.31 km^{2} (26.37 sq mi)
- Elevation: 220 m (720 ft)
- Highest elevation: 1,280 m (4,200 ft)
- Lowest elevation: 194 m (636 ft)
- Population (2023): 10,684
  - Density: 156.4/km^{2} (405.1/sq mi)
- Time zone: UTC+01:00 (CET)
  - Summer (DST): UTC+02:00 (CEST)
- INSEE/Postal code: 64422 /64400
- ^{1} French Land Register data, which excludes lakes, ponds, glaciers > 1 km^{2} (0.386 sq mi or 247 acres) and river estuaries.

Oloron-Sainte-Marie (French pronunciation: [ɔlɔʁɔ̃ sɛ̃t maʁi]; Occitan: Auloron e Senta Maria; Basque: Oloroe-Donamaria) is a commune in the southwestern French department of Pyrénées-Atlantiques.

== History ==
The town was founded by the Romans in the 1st century, then known as Illoronensium. Situated on the Roman way between the important towns of Dax and Zaragoza, its position was strategic. Today known as Saint-Grat, Gratus of Oloron became in 506 the first known archbishop of the Ancient Diocese of Oloron then known as "Iluro".

The history of the town during the Migration Period is little known. In 1080, the viscount Centule V, Viscount of Béarn built the new city of "Oloron" (medieval version of the Roman name Iluro) on the opposite side of the river from the diocese center. Centule V restored the Roman walls and founded the strong city of Oloron that was to be used as a base to retake Aragon held by the Moors. The Oloron Cathedral was built at the beginning of the 12th century. The viscountal town of Oloron and the episcopal town of Sainte-Marie were then rivals, but Oloron strove on its textile industry and commerce with neighbouring Spain. Sainte-Marie became economically dependent upon Oloron.

The 18th century was the beginning of revival for Sainte-Marie as the end of French Wars of Religion allowed for restorations and new religious constructions in the town: cathedral, seminary, church Saint-Pierre. Moreover, the continued boom of commerce with Spain accelerated the construction of better communication and transportation routes to Oloron and Sainte-Marie.

With the French Revolution, Oloron lost its diocese to Bayonne but gained administrative importance by becoming one of the sous-préfectures of the new Republic. In 1858, the regent Empress Eugénie imposed the reunification of the towns of Oloron and Sainte-Marie.

== Geography ==
=== Location ===
Situated at the feet of the Pyrénées, 50 km from the Spanish border and 100 km from the Atlantic ocean, Oloron-Sainte-Marie is at the confluence of two torrents (gaves), the Gave d'Aspe and the Gave d'Ossau, that merge to form the Gave d'Oloron. Capital of the Haut-Béarn, Oloron-Sainte-Marie is also at the point of origin of the three Haut-Béarn valleys : the Aspe Valley, the Ossau Valley and the Barétous Valley.

Neighboring communes: Esquiule, Moumour, Ledeuix, Estos, Cardesse, Monein, Goès, Précilhon, Escout, Herrère, Ogeu-les-Bains, Buziet, Arudy, Escot, Asasp-Arros, Lurbe-Saint-Christau, Eysus, Gurmençon, Bidos, Agnos, Ance and Féas.

=== Climate ===
The town has an oceanic climate, with mild and humid winters and cool or moderately warm summers. Rain is quite abundant (above 900 mm per year) and is mostly concentrated during cold season.

== Population ==
Historical population
Year	Pop.	±% p.a.
1968	13,028	—
1975	12,332	−0.78%
1982	11,513	−0.98%
1990	11,067	−0.49%
1999	10,992	−0.08%
2007	11,141	+0.17%
2012	10,678	−0.85%
2017	10,684	+0.01%
2023	10,684	+0.00%
Source: INSEE

== Economy ==
The Oloron economy is dominated by two well known manufacturing businesses:

* Lindt & Sprüngli have a chocolate factory in Oloron.
* Safran Landing Systems have a plant in the adjacent commune of Bidos which manufactures landing gear for aircraft.

Oloron is also famous, among hat enthusiasts, as the capital of the basque beret, although the beret business has fallen victim to the widespread collapse of the European textile business as well as changing fashions. Today only one beret business survives in Oloron. This is the Béatex company which employs approximately 80 people.

The area also benefits from an active agriculture sector, involving animal rearing and general agriculture as well as maize production. It is also part of the AOC defined districts entitled to produce the ewes' cheese, Ossau-Iraty.

== Transport ==
The Pau–Canfranc railway passes through Oloron. Oloron railway station is served by TER Aquitaine, which operate eight trains per day to Pau and six to Bedous.

Public transport in the town is provided by a company called La Navette, which operate three bus routes.

Oloron - Herrère Aérodrome is an aerodrome five kilometers southeast of Oloron. It is predominantly used for light aviation and leisure.

== Culture and heritage ==
=== Language ===
The local vernacular language is the Béarnese dialect, a dialect of Gascon language. One of the eight primary schools of Oloron is a Calandreta, a French/ Béarnese bilingual school.

The demonym corresponding to Oloron-Sainte-Marie is Oloronais.

=== Architectural and historical landmarks ===
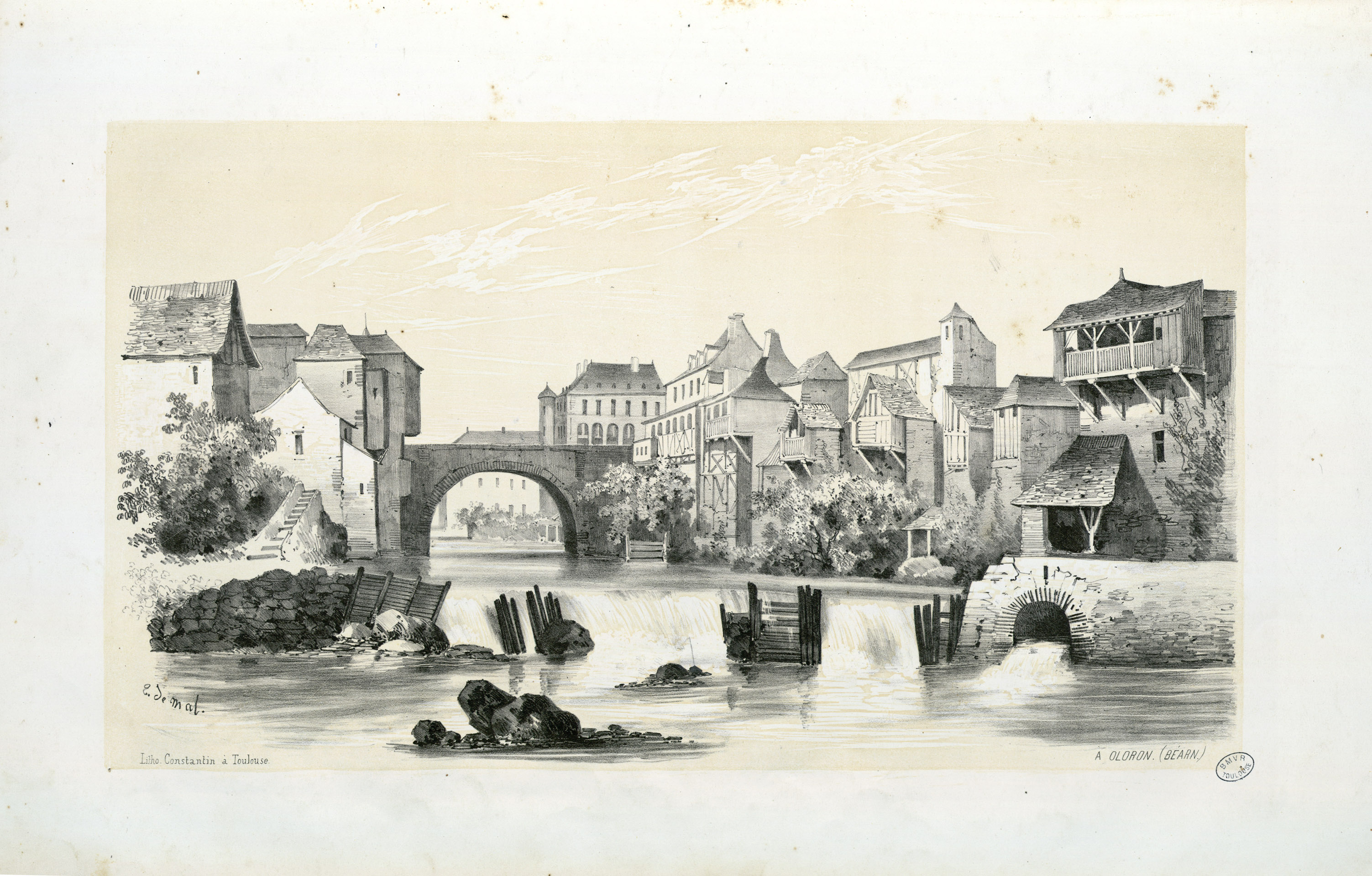
Oloron in 1843, by Eugène de Malbos

The town received the label French Towns and Lands of Art and History in November 2006.

Oloron's architectural and historical landmarks:

- the 13th-century Tour de Grède
- the former town hall and prison, classified in 1987 among as Monument historique
- the fortified walls
- the 16th-century Legugnon castle
- the 17th-century building in the rue Pomone, classified in 1943 as Monument historique
- the Parc Pommé
- the "Maison du Patrimoine"
- the Médiathèque public library that was awarded the Équerre d'Argent architectural award in 2010 (architect: Pascale Guédot).
- the Oloron Cathedral
- the Sainte Marie church
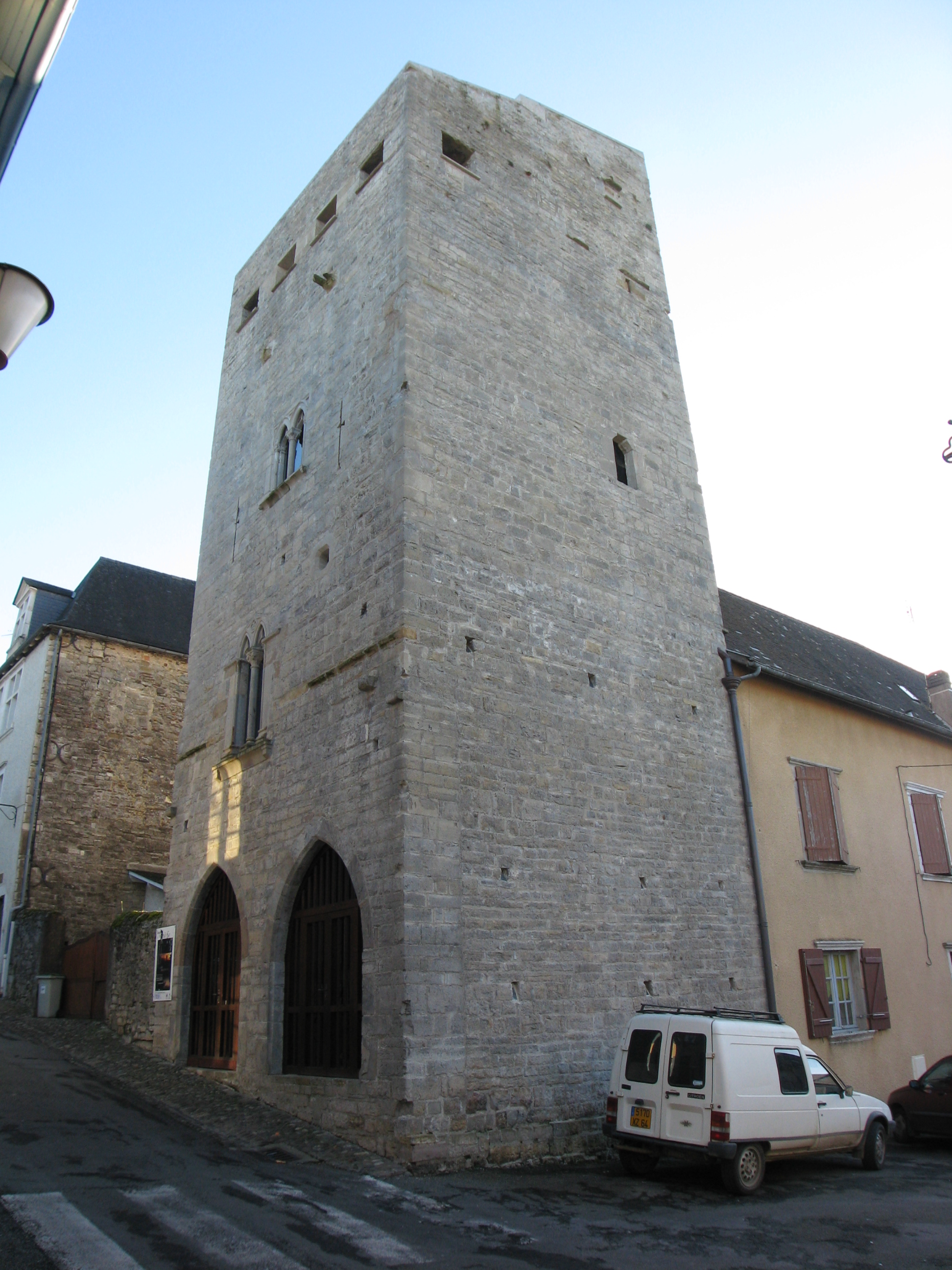
Tour de Grède

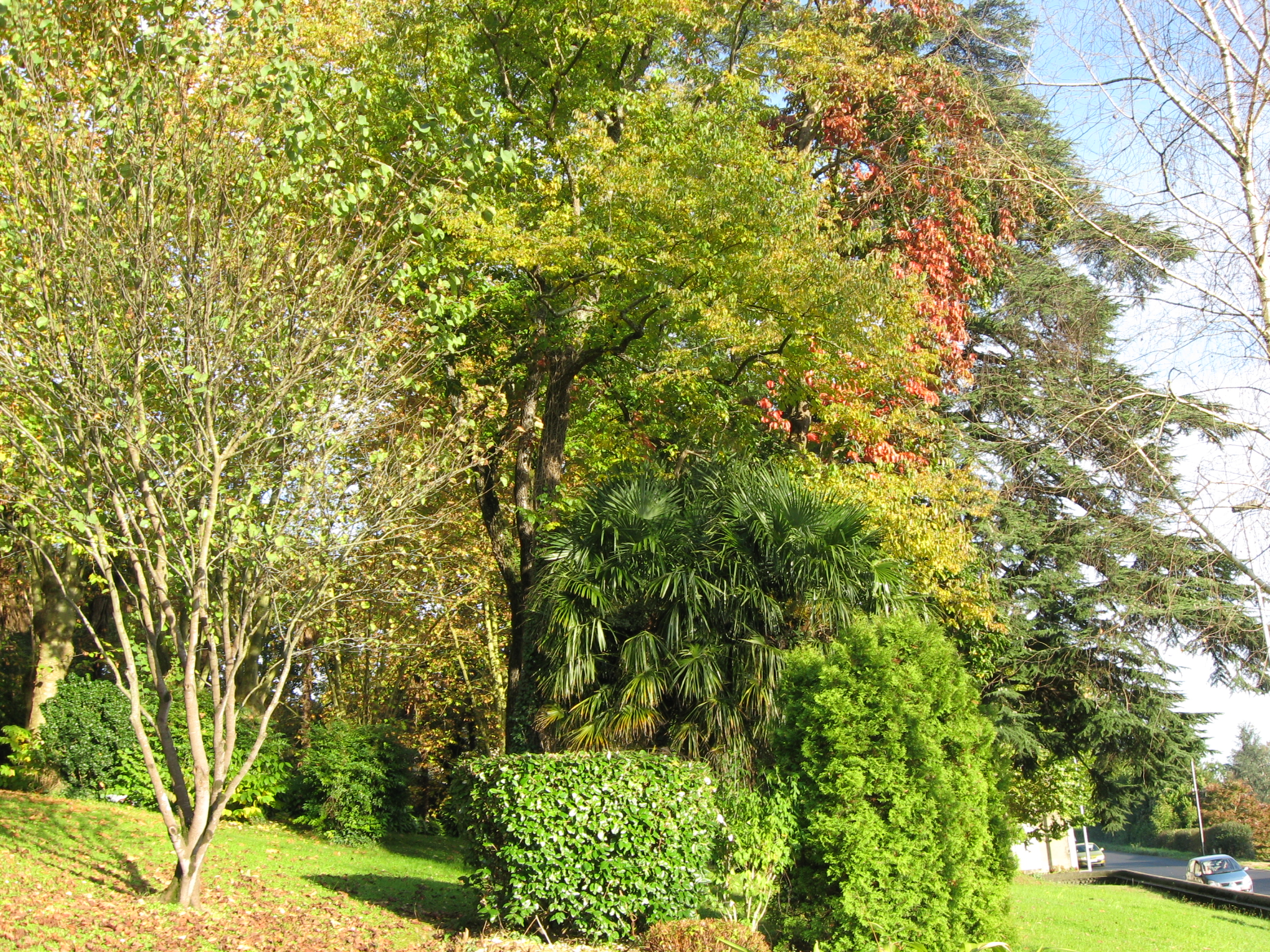
Parc Pommé

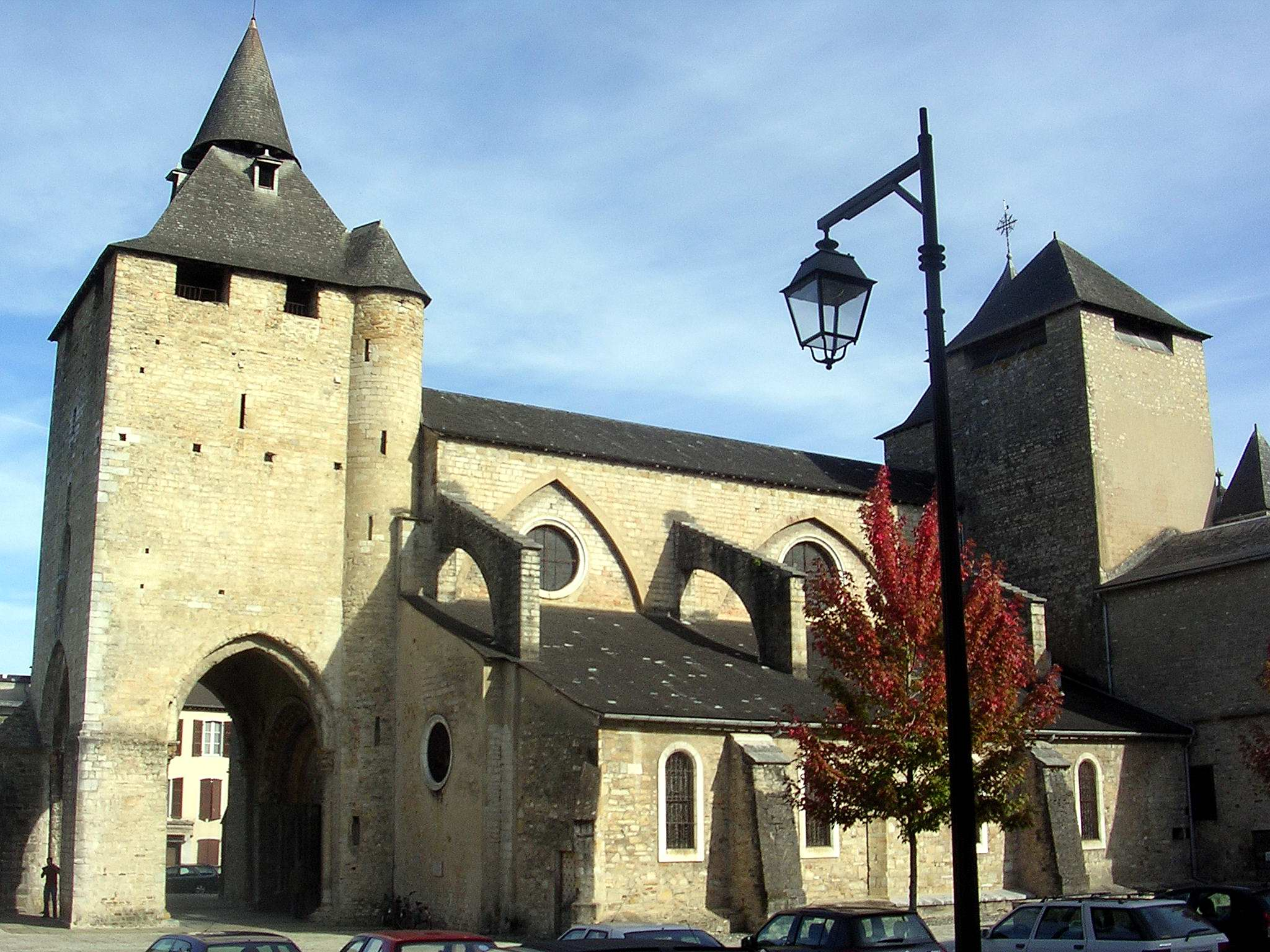
Cathedral Sainte Marie

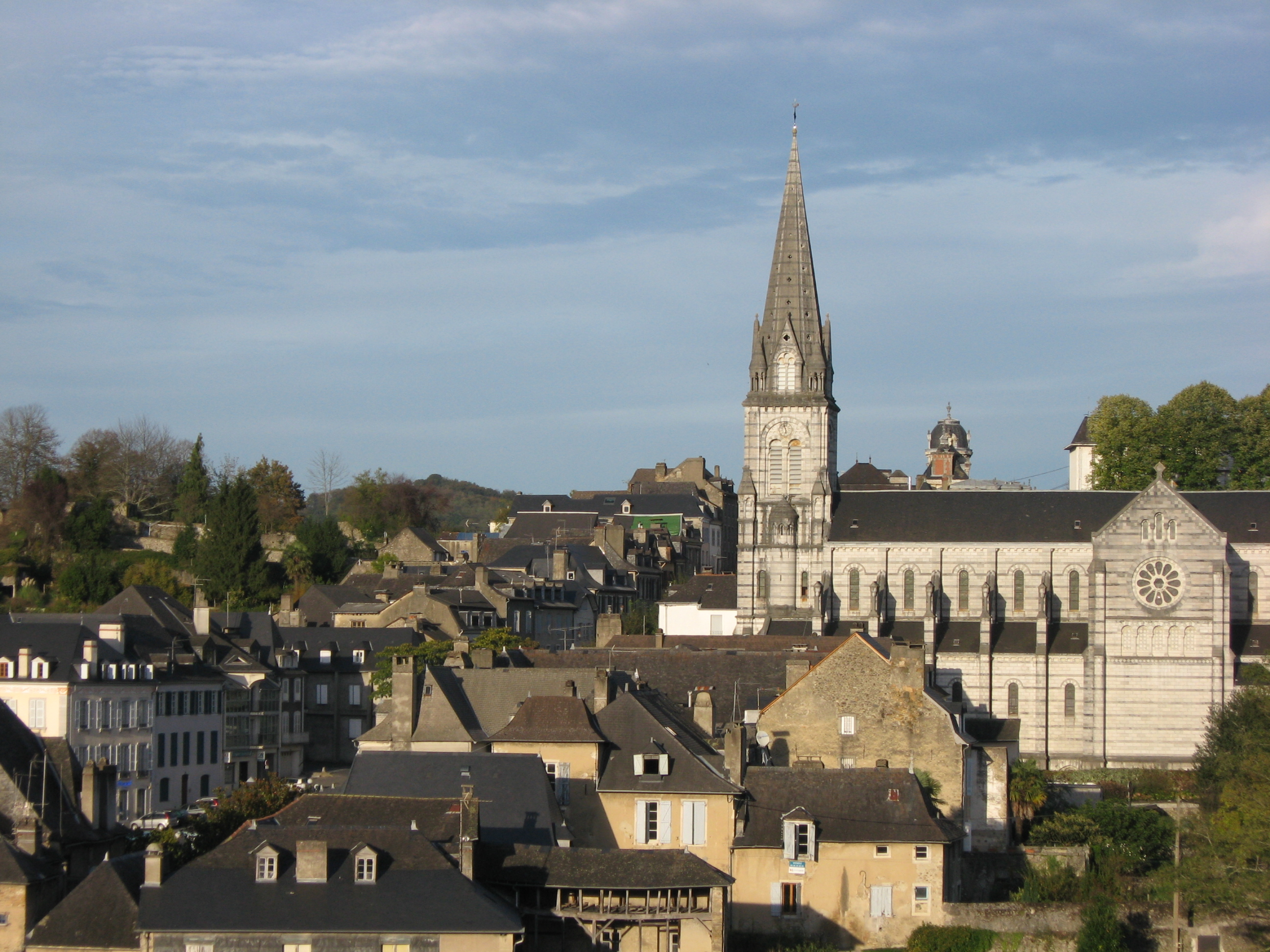
Eglise Notre Dame

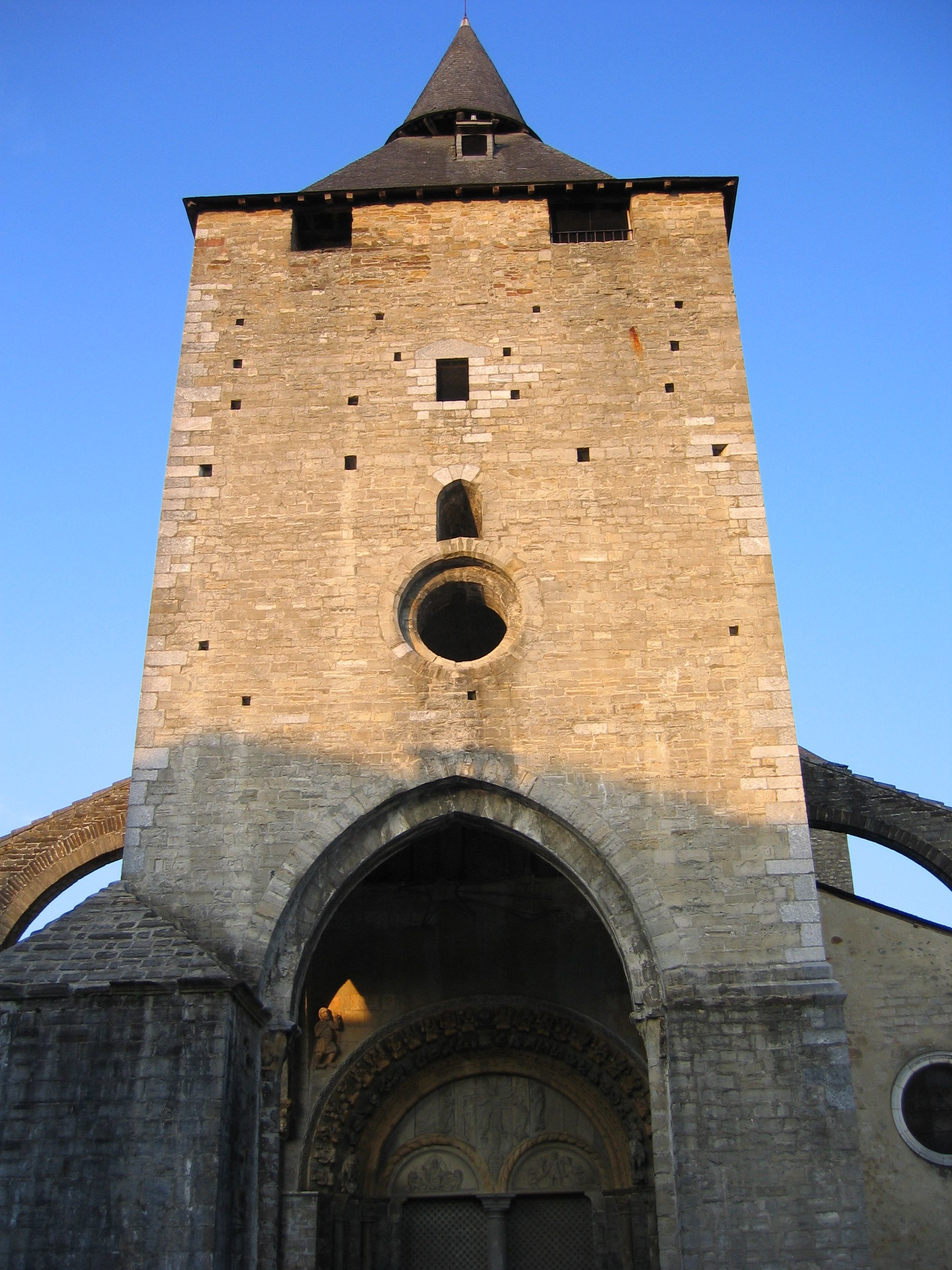
Cathedral Sainte Marie

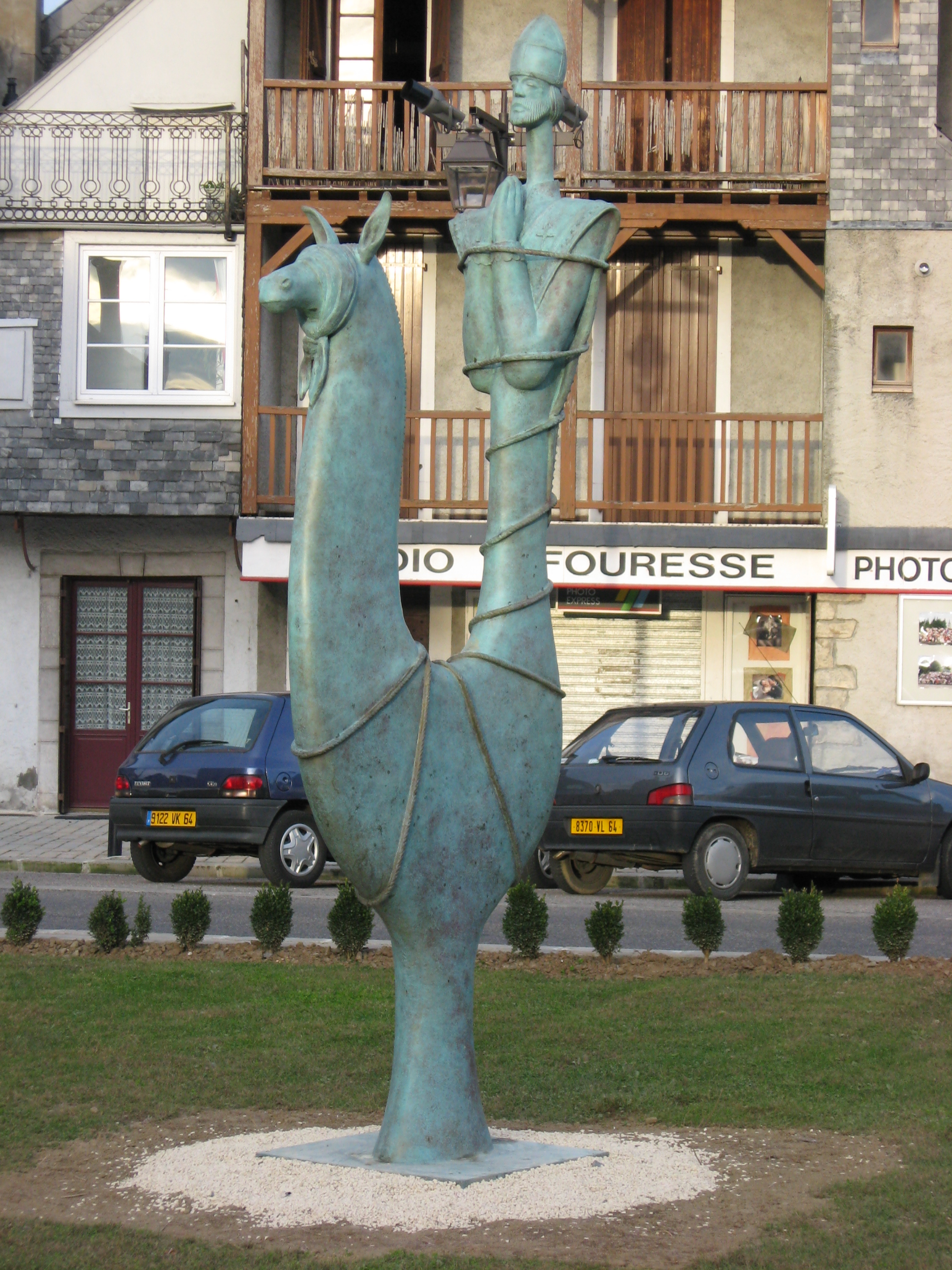
Saint Great

Media related to Oloron-Sainte-Marie at Wikimedia Commons

=== Cultural life ===
Oloron is home to a number of festivals :

- the jazz festival Des Rives & Notes on the first weekend of July,
- the "Amateur web film festival", organised every spring season to showcase the best short films published on the internet,
- the "Book without borders" fair held on the second weekend of June.

Oloron-Sainte-Marie has a theatre and concert venue (espace Pierre Jéliote).

=== Gastronomy ===
The town is renowned for its hearty vegetables, beans and meat soup, the garbure, for the Ossau-Iraty cheese, and for a delicacy invented by a local baker in 1925, the pastry "le Russe".

== Notable people ==
Oloron-Sainte-Marie was the birthplace of:

- Louis Barthou (1862–1934), politician of the Third Republic
- Jean-Jacques Caux (Cataline) (1830–1922), explorer of the Canadian West
- Suzanne Honoré (1909-2000), archivist at the National Library of France
- Ketty Lapeyrette (1884–1960), opera singer
- Camille Lopez (born 1989), rugby player

== Climate ==
Climate data for Oloron-Sainte-Marie (1981–2010 normals, extremes 1964–2012)
Month	Jan	Feb	Mar	Apr	May	Jun	Jul	Aug	Sep	Oct	Nov	Dec	Year
Record high °C (°F)	26.0 (78.8)	27.8 (82.0)	29.6 (85.3)	32.2 (90.0)	35.8 (96.4)	38.4 (101.1)	39.5 (103.1)	40.6 (105.1)	38.0 (100.4)	34.5 (94.1)	29.3 (84.7)	27.0 (80.6)	40.6 (105.1)
Mean daily maximum °C (°F)	11.9 (53.4)	13.0 (55.4)	15.7 (60.3)	17.3 (63.1)	20.9 (69.6)	24.0 (75.2)	26.1 (79.0)	26.3 (79.3)	24.1 (75.4)	20.4 (68.7)	15.2 (59.4)	12.5 (54.5)	19.0 (66.2)
Daily mean °C (°F)	6.9 (44.4)	7.6 (45.7)	10.0 (50.0)	11.7 (53.1)	15.4 (59.7)	18.5 (65.3)	20.6 (69.1)	20.7 (69.3)	18.2 (64.8)	14.8 (58.6)	10.1 (50.2)	7.6 (45.7)	13.5 (56.3)
Mean daily minimum °C (°F)	1.9 (35.4)	2.2 (36.0)	4.4 (39.9)	6.1 (43.0)	9.9 (49.8)	13.1 (55.6)	15.2 (59.4)	15.1 (59.2)	12.3 (54.1)	9.3 (48.7)	5.0 (41.0)	2.7 (36.9)	8.1 (46.6)
Record low °C (°F)	−16.0 (3.2)	−11.3 (11.7)	−9.2 (15.4)	−2.5 (27.5)	0.8 (33.4)	2.6 (36.7)	7.3 (45.1)	4.9 (40.8)	2.3 (36.1)	−2.5 (27.5)	−9.3 (15.3)	−10.1 (13.8)	−16.0 (3.2)
Average precipitation mm (inches)	122.6 (4.83)	103.3 (4.07)	106.7 (4.20)	138.0 (5.43)	123.7 (4.87)	101.6 (4.00)	82.3 (3.24)	93.1 (3.67)	96.6 (3.80)	117.7 (4.63)	137.4 (5.41)	118.2 (4.65)	1,341.2 (52.80)
Average precipitation days (≥ 1.0 mm)	12.1	11.0	11.5	14.0	13.6	11.0	9.0	9.8	9.4	12.0	11.6	11.7	136.7
Source: Meteociel

== See also ==
- Oloron Cathedral
- Gave d'Oloron
- Gave d'Ossau
- Gave d'Aspe
- Ancient Diocese of Oloron
- Communes of the Pyrénées-Atlantiques department
