= Canton of Laruns =

Coordinates: 43°08′22″N 0°25′07″W

Laruns
- Former canton
- Interactive map of Laruns
- Country: France
- Region: Nouvelle-Aquitaine
- Department: Pyrénées-Atlantiques
- No. of communes: {{{nbcomm}}}
- Disbanded: 2015
- Area: 432 km^{2} (167 sq mi)
- Population (2012): 2,990
  - Density: 6.92/km^{2} (17.9/sq mi)

The canton of Laruns is a former canton located in the arrondissement of Oloron-Sainte-Marie, in the département of Pyrénées-Atlantiques, in the Aquitaine région of France. It was disbanded following the French canton reorganisation which came into effect in March 2015. It consisted of 8 communes, which joined the canton of Oloron-Sainte-Marie-2 in 2015.

== Communes ==
The communes of the canton of Laruns were:

- Aste-Béon
- Béost
- Bielle
- Bilhères
- Eaux-Bonnes
- Gère-Bélesten
- Laruns
- Louvie-Soubiron
