= Poey =

Poey may refer to:

- Felipe Poey
- Oscar Poey Bonachea
- Poey-de-Lescar
- Poey-d'Oloron
