= Lac d'Isabe =

Lake in France

- Location within Pyrenees
- Location: Pyrénées, Pyrénées-Atlantiques
- Coordinates: 42°55′52″N 0°30′0″W
- Basin countries: France
- Surface area: 0.073 km^{2} (0.028 sq mi)
- Max. depth: 25 m (82 ft)
- Surface elevation: 1,925 m (6,316 ft)

Lac d'Isabe is a lake in Pyrénées, Pyrénées-Atlantiques, France. At an elevation of 1,925 m, its surface area is 0.073 km^{2}.

Lac d'Isabe is in the commune of Laruns, in Ossau Valley.
