= Néez =

Néez is the name of two tributaries of the Gave de Pau:

- Néez (Pyrénées-Atlantiques) (also Néez de Gan), in the Pyrénées-Atlantiques department
- Néez (Hautes-Pyrénées) (also Néez de Saint-Créac), in the Hautes-Pyrénées department
