= Lasseubetat =

- Commune
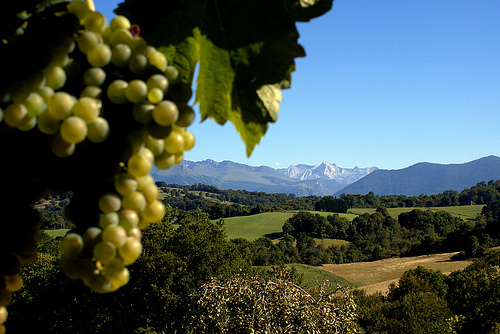
- Jurançon vineyard and landscape
- Location of Lasseubetat
- Location within France Location within Nouvelle-Aquitaine
- Coordinates: 43°10′19″N 0°27′27″W
- Country: France
- Region: Nouvelle-Aquitaine
- Department: Pyrénées-Atlantiques
- Arrondissement: Oloron-Sainte-Marie
- Canton: Oloron-Sainte-Marie-2

Government
  - Mayor (2020–2026): Christine Cabon
- Area^{1}: 7.06 km^{2} (2.73 sq mi)
- Elevation: 377 m (1,237 ft)
- Highest elevation: 445 m (1,460 ft)
- Lowest elevation: 198 m (650 ft)
- Population (2023): 188
  - Density: 26.6/km^{2} (69.0/sq mi)
- Time zone: UTC+01:00 (CET)
  - Summer (DST): UTC+02:00 (CEST)
- INSEE/Postal code: 64325 /64290
- ^{1} French Land Register data, which excludes lakes, ponds, glaciers > 1 km^{2} (0.386 sq mi or 247 acres) and river estuaries.

Lasseubetat (French pronunciation: [lasœbta]; Occitan: La Sauvetat) is a commune in the Pyrénées-Atlantiques department and Nouvelle-Aquitaine region of south-western France.

== See also ==
- Communes of the Pyrénées-Atlantiques department
