= Bescat =

- Commune
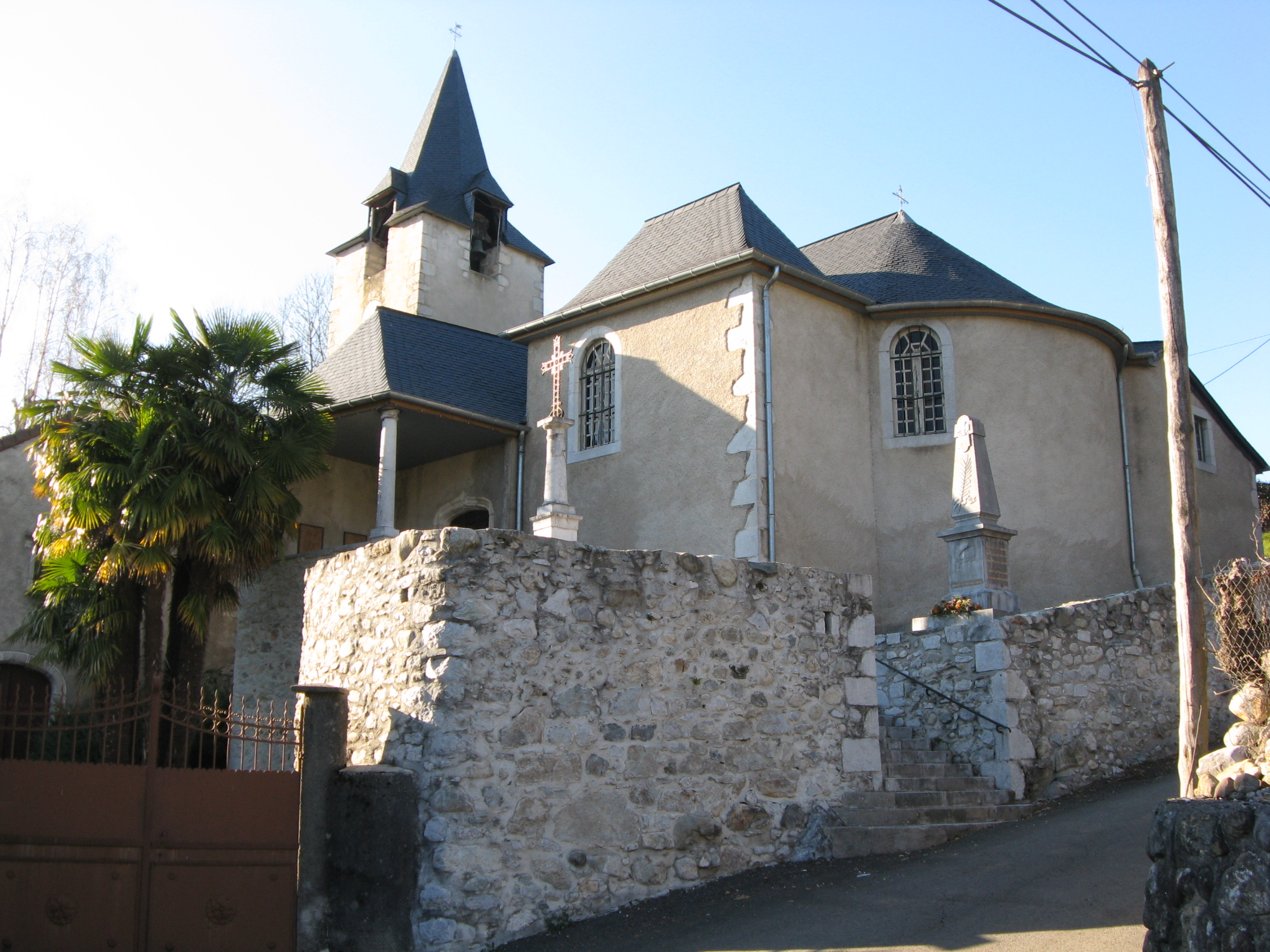
- The church of Saint Lizier, in Bescat
- Location of Bescat
- Location within France Location within Nouvelle-Aquitaine
- Coordinates: 43°07′33″N 0°25′34″W
- Country: France
- Region: Nouvelle-Aquitaine
- Department: Pyrénées-Atlantiques
- Arrondissement: Oloron-Sainte-Marie
- Canton: Oloron-Sainte-Marie-2
- Intercommunality: Vallée d'Ossau

Government
  - Mayor (2020–2026): Jean-Louis Barban
- Area^{1}: 6.81 km^{2} (2.63 sq mi)
- Elevation: 459 m (1,506 ft)
- Highest elevation: 569 m (1,867 ft)
- Lowest elevation: 335 m (1,099 ft)
- Population (2023): 255
  - Density: 37.4/km^{2} (97.0/sq mi)
- Time zone: UTC+01:00 (CET)
  - Summer (DST): UTC+02:00 (CEST)
- INSEE/Postal code: 64116 /64260
- ^{1} French Land Register data, which excludes lakes, ponds, glaciers > 1 km^{2} (0.386 sq mi or 247 acres) and river estuaries.

Bescat (French pronunciation: [bɛskat]) is a commune of the Pyrénées-Atlantiques department in southwestern France.

== See also ==
- Ossau Valley
- Communes of the Pyrénées-Atlantiques department
