= Verdets =

- Commune
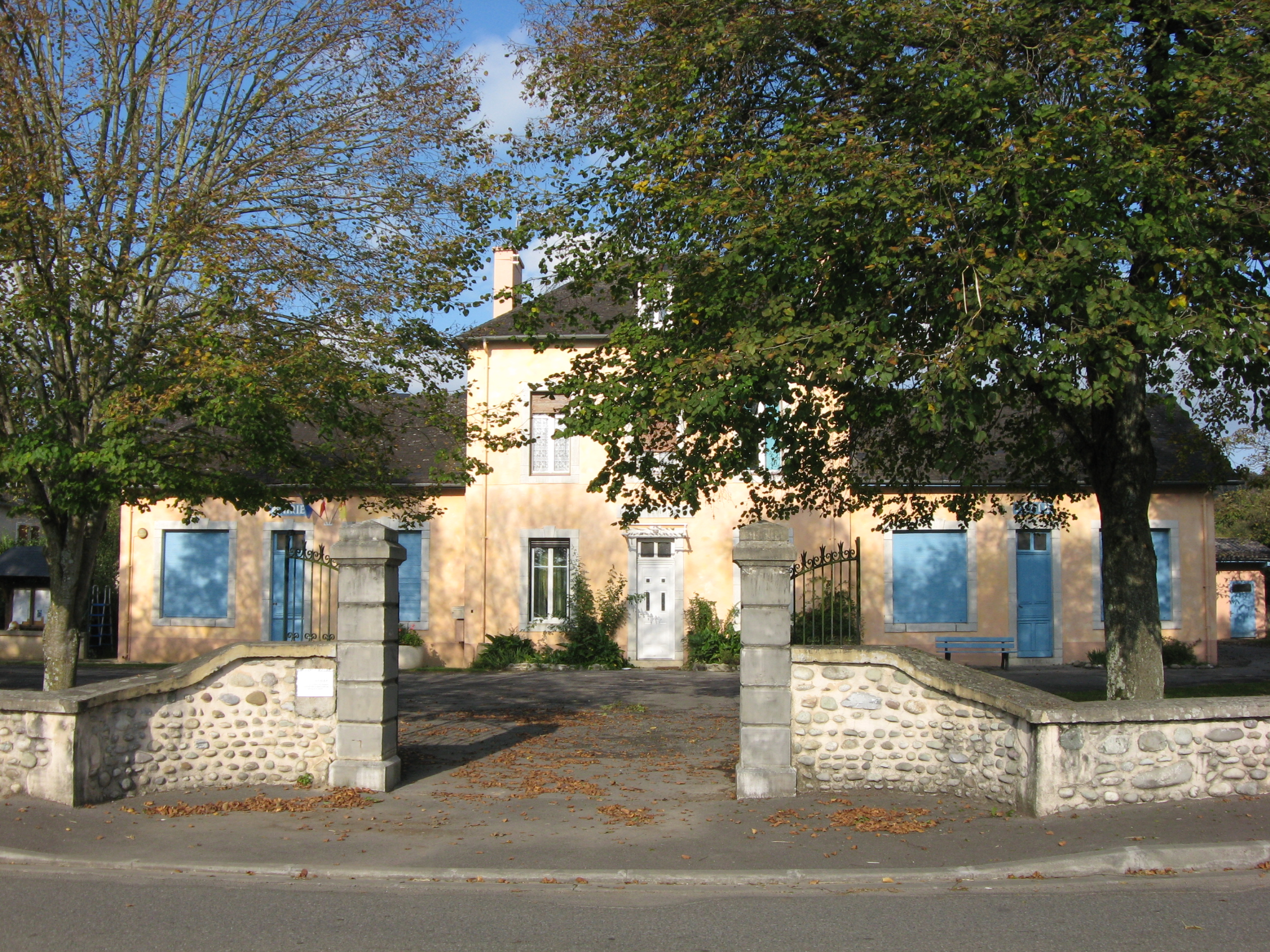
- Town hall and school
- Location of Verdets
- Location within France Location within Nouvelle-Aquitaine
- Coordinates: 43°13′36″N 0°38′37″W
- Country: France
- Region: Nouvelle-Aquitaine
- Department: Pyrénées-Atlantiques
- Arrondissement: Oloron-Sainte-Marie
- Canton: Oloron-Sainte-Marie-2
- Intercommunality: Haut Béarn

Government
  - Mayor (2020–2026): Christophe Guéry
- Area^{1}: 5.62 km^{2} (2.17 sq mi)
- Elevation: 200 m (660 ft)
- Highest elevation: 250 m (820 ft)
- Lowest elevation: 177 m (581 ft)
- Population (2023): 300
  - Density: 53/km^{2} (140/sq mi)
- Time zone: UTC+01:00 (CET)
  - Summer (DST): UTC+02:00 (CEST)
- INSEE/Postal code: 64551 /64400
- ^{1} French Land Register data, which excludes lakes, ponds, glaciers > 1 km^{2} (0.386 sq mi or 247 acres) and river estuaries.

Verdets (French pronunciation: [vɛʁdɛts]; Gascon: Berdets) is a commune in the Pyrénées-Atlantiques department and Nouvelle-Aquitaine region of south-western France.

== See also ==
- Communes of the Pyrénées-Atlantiques department
