= Suzanne Honoré =

French librarian and historian (1909-2000)

- Born: Suzanne Duvergé; July 13, 1909; Oloron-Sainte-Marie
- Died: March 17, 2000 (aged 90); Paris
- Education: École Nationale des Chartes (1932)
- Occupations: Librarian, archivist
- Employer: National Library of France (1943-1978)
- Spouse: Pierre-Henri-Félix Honoré
- Children: 3
- Awards: Commander of the Ordre des Palmes Académiques; Ordre national du Mérite; Legion of Honor; Officer of the Legion of Honor

Suzanne Honoré (1909-2000) was a French librarian, archivist and historian for decades at the National Library of France. She was also known as Suzanne Duvergé. She was conferred with honorific awards in recognition of her input to librarianship. These awards were: Commander of the Order of Academic Palms, Ordre national du Mérite, Legion of Honor, Officer of the Legion of Honor in 1958, 1960, and 1976 respectively.

== Biography ==
Honoré was born July 13, 1909, in Oloron-Sainte-Marie (Pyrénées-Atlantiques) as Suzanne Duvergé, and died on March 17, 2000, in Paris. She was married to a sculptor, Pierre-Henri-Félix Honoré. She had three children.

=== Education ===
Honoré obtained a degree in history and geography in 1928. She enrolled in the École Nationale des chartes and graduated in 1932 as an archivist palaeographer.

=== Career ===
In 1936, Honoré joined the National Library of France as a volunteer, then in 1943 she was fully employed as a staff of the National Library of France. She eventually became a titular librarian. Honoré had much knowledge of the National Library and cataloging, which gave her the opportunity to create the first community star ever to appear in the catalog “Schneider et Cie”.

Honoré for many years was in charge of a course on printed archives at the internship international archives organized by the Archives Directorate of France. She was also appointed chief curator in 1963 and was mandated to head the international exchange department. She created the first authority file in France, which was for stars of private communities.

From 1967 to 1979, Honoré was director of the entries department of the National Library of France. However, in 1971, she was appointed member of the brand new Commission for the coordination of administrative documentation created under the Prime Minister, and she worked within the publications committee of this commission. While in this position, she started the computerization of the Bibliography of France. Honoré understood the importance of shared cataloging, which made her involved with the curator at the University Library of Grenoble, Marc Chauveine on the Machine Readable Cataloging (MARC) formats. Honoré's involvement gave birth to the first French machine readable catalog, then to Intermarc and Unimarc. After working extensively at the National Library of France, she retired in 1978.

== Recognition ==
Due to Honoré's impact on librarianship, she was recognized and conferred with honorific awards.

- Commandeur of the Ordre des Palmes Académiques in 1958
- Ordre national du Mérite in 1960
- Legion of Honor in 1960
- Officer of the Legion of Honor in 1976
