= Saucède =

- Commune
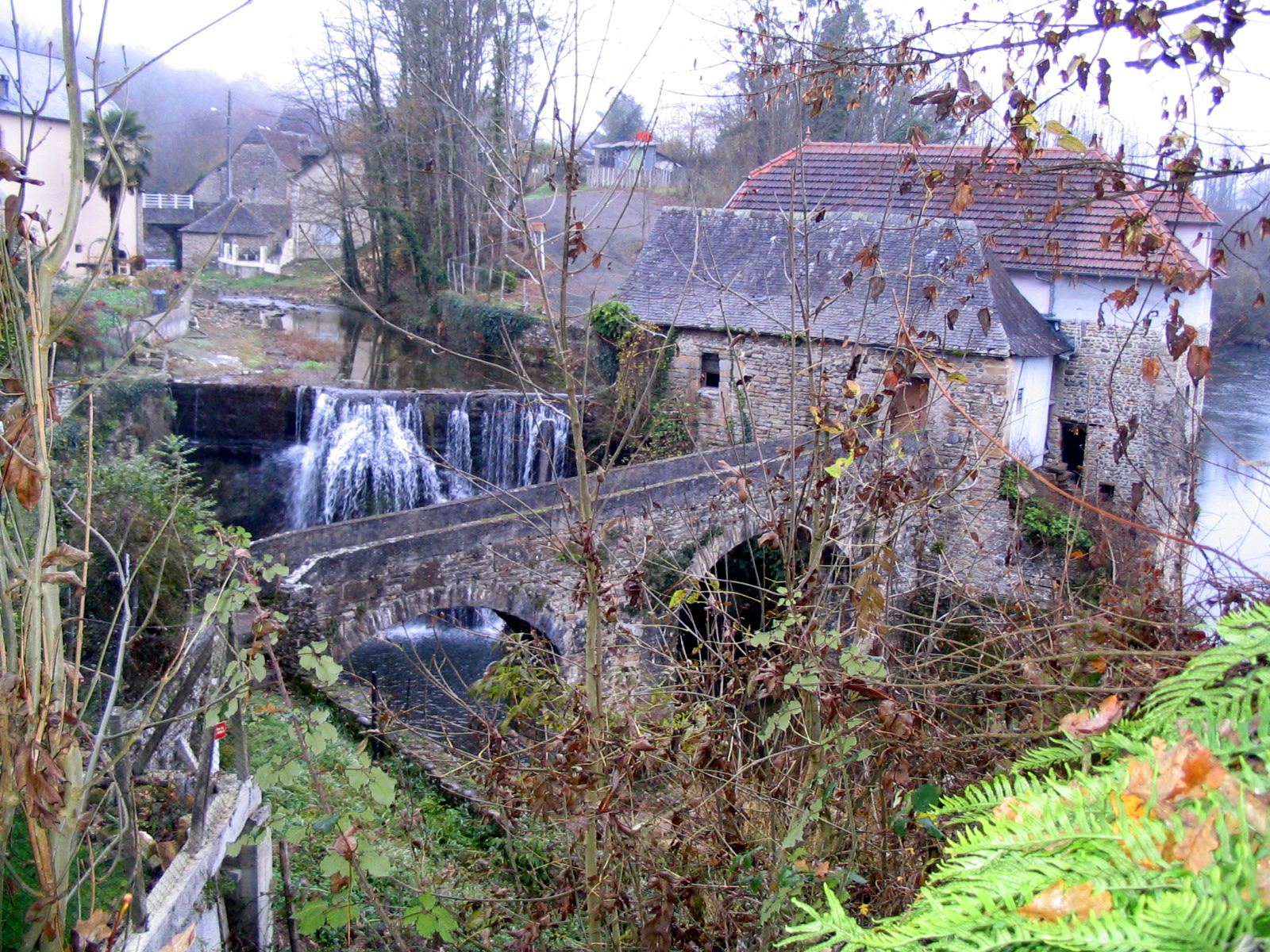
- The mill of Saucède
- Location of Saucède
- Location within France Location within Nouvelle-Aquitaine
- Coordinates: 43°16′12″N 0°41′02″W
- Country: France
- Region: Nouvelle-Aquitaine
- Department: Pyrénées-Atlantiques
- Arrondissement: Oloron-Sainte-Marie
- Canton: Oloron-Sainte-Marie-2

Government
  - Mayor (2020–2026): Martine Mirande
- Area^{1}: 7.10 km^{2} (2.74 sq mi)
- Elevation: 205 m (673 ft)
- Highest elevation: 266 m (873 ft)
- Lowest elevation: 153 m (502 ft)
- Population (2023): 125
  - Density: 17.6/km^{2} (45.6/sq mi)
- Time zone: UTC+01:00 (CET)
  - Summer (DST): UTC+02:00 (CEST)
- INSEE/Postal code: 64508 /64400
- ^{1} French Land Register data, which excludes lakes, ponds, glaciers > 1 km^{2} (0.386 sq mi or 247 acres) and river estuaries.

Saucède (French pronunciation: [sosɛd]; Occitan: Sauceda) is a commune in the Pyrénées-Atlantiques department in south-western France.

== See also ==
- Communes of the Pyrénées-Atlantiques department
