= Estialescq =

- Commune
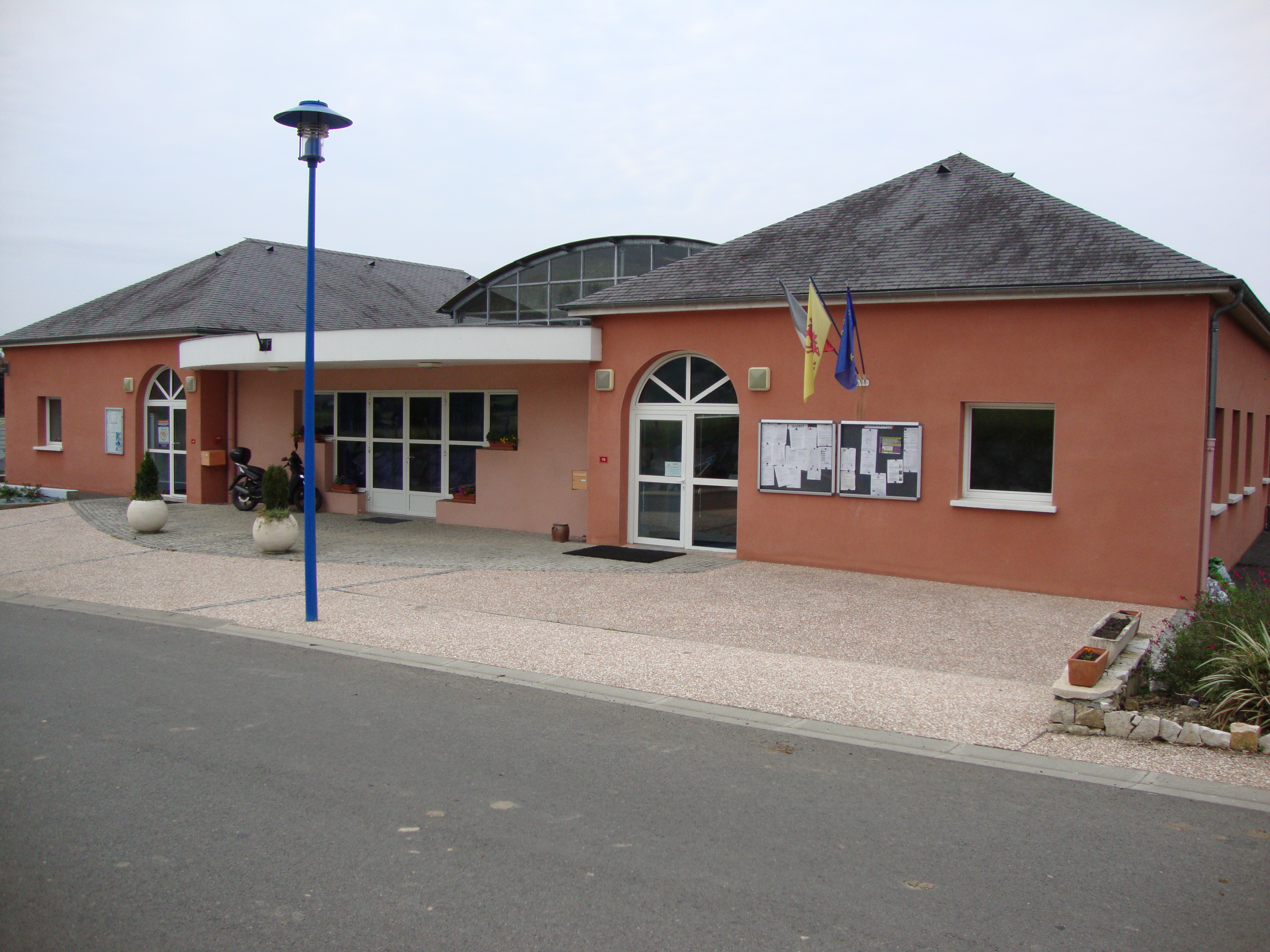
- Town Hall
- Location of Estialescq
- Location within France Location within Nouvelle-Aquitaine
- Coordinates: 43°13′15″N 0°33′03″W
- Country: France
- Region: Nouvelle-Aquitaine
- Department: Pyrénées-Atlantiques
- Arrondissement: Oloron-Sainte-Marie
- Canton: Oloron-Sainte-Marie-2
- Intercommunality: Haut Béarn

Government
  - Mayor (2020–2026): Suzanne Sage
- Area^{1}: 5.14 km^{2} (1.98 sq mi)
- Elevation: 285 m (935 ft)
- Highest elevation: 365 m (1,198 ft)
- Lowest elevation: 244 m (801 ft)
- Population (2023): 257
  - Density: 50.0/km^{2} (129/sq mi)
- Time zone: UTC+01:00 (CET)
  - Summer (DST): UTC+02:00 (CEST)
- INSEE/Postal code: 64219 /64290
- ^{1} French Land Register data, which excludes lakes, ponds, glaciers > 1 km^{2} (0.386 sq mi or 247 acres) and river estuaries.

Estialescq (French pronunciation: [ɛstjalɛsk]; Occitan: Estialesc) is a commune in the Pyrénées-Atlantiques department in south-western France.

== See also ==
- Communes of the Pyrénées-Atlantiques department
