= Néez (Pyrénées-Atlantiques) =

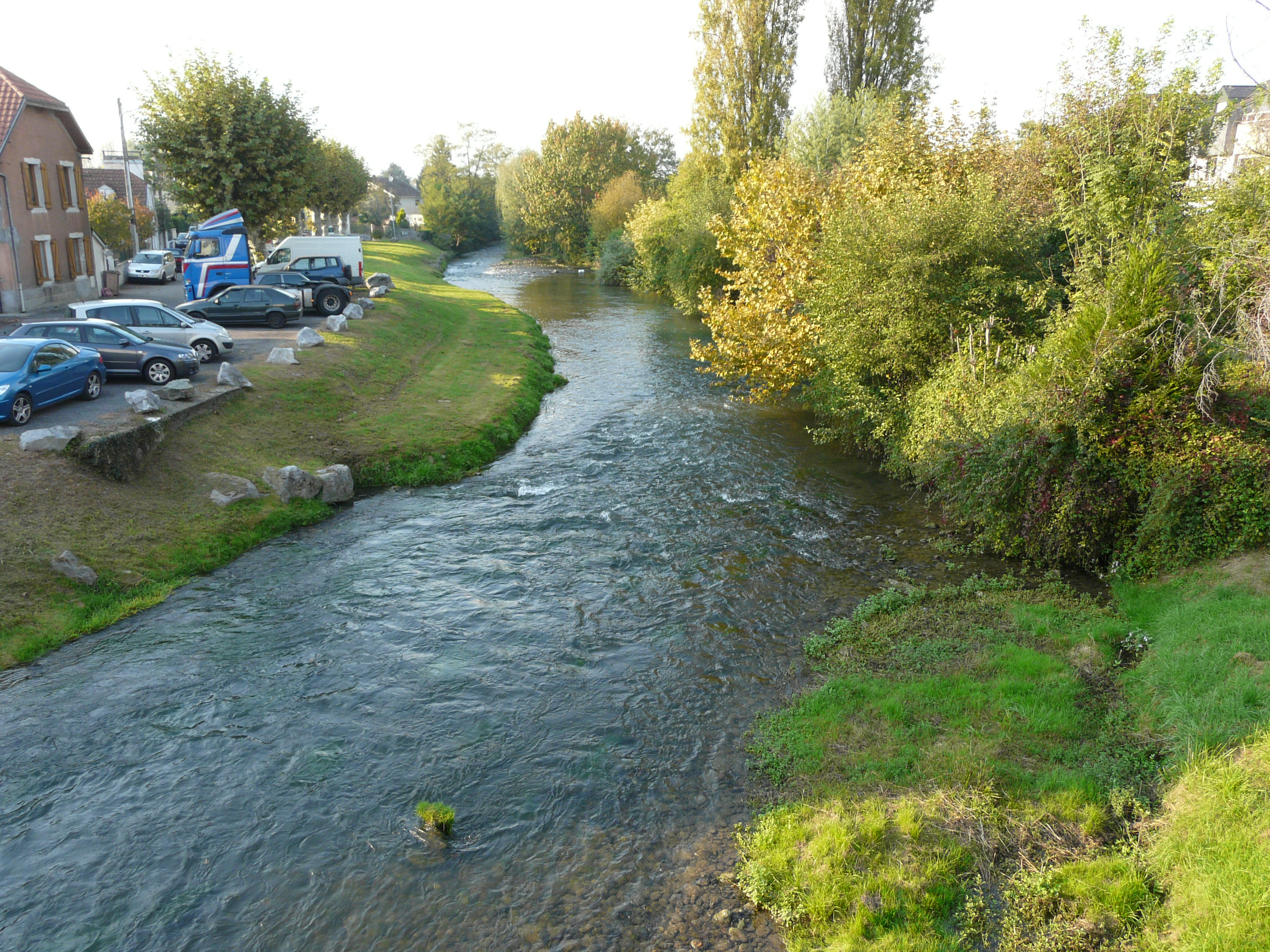

- Location within France Location within Nouvelle-Aquitaine

Location
- Country: France

Physical characteristics
- Source
  - location: South of Pau
- Mouth
  - location: Gave de Pau
  - coordinates: 43°17′34″N 0°24′29″W
- Length: 26 km (16 mi)

Basin features
- Progression: Gave de Pau→ Gaves réunis→ Adour→ Atlantic Ocean

The Néez of Gan (also: Nez) is a left tributary of the Gave de Pau, in Béarn (Pyrénées-Atlantiques), in the Southwest of France. It flows into the Gave downstream from Pau. It is 26.1 km (16.2 mi) long.

== Name ==
The Néez (a.k.a. Nez, Néès, Neys...) shares its name with another tributary, the Néez of Saint-Créac, in the south of Lourdes.

This name is a variant of the Pyrenean hydronym Léez (alternation l / n).

== Geography ==
The Néez rises on the territory of Rébénacq; it is fed by the brook of Houndarnas, a small brook flowing from the slopes of Sévignacq, and by several resurgences of the gave d'Ossau in the south of the village.

The Néez flows north into the Gave de Pau in Jurançon.

== Départements and towns ==
- Pyrénées-Atlantiques: Rébénacq, Gan, Bosdarros et Jurançon.
