= Escou =

- Commune
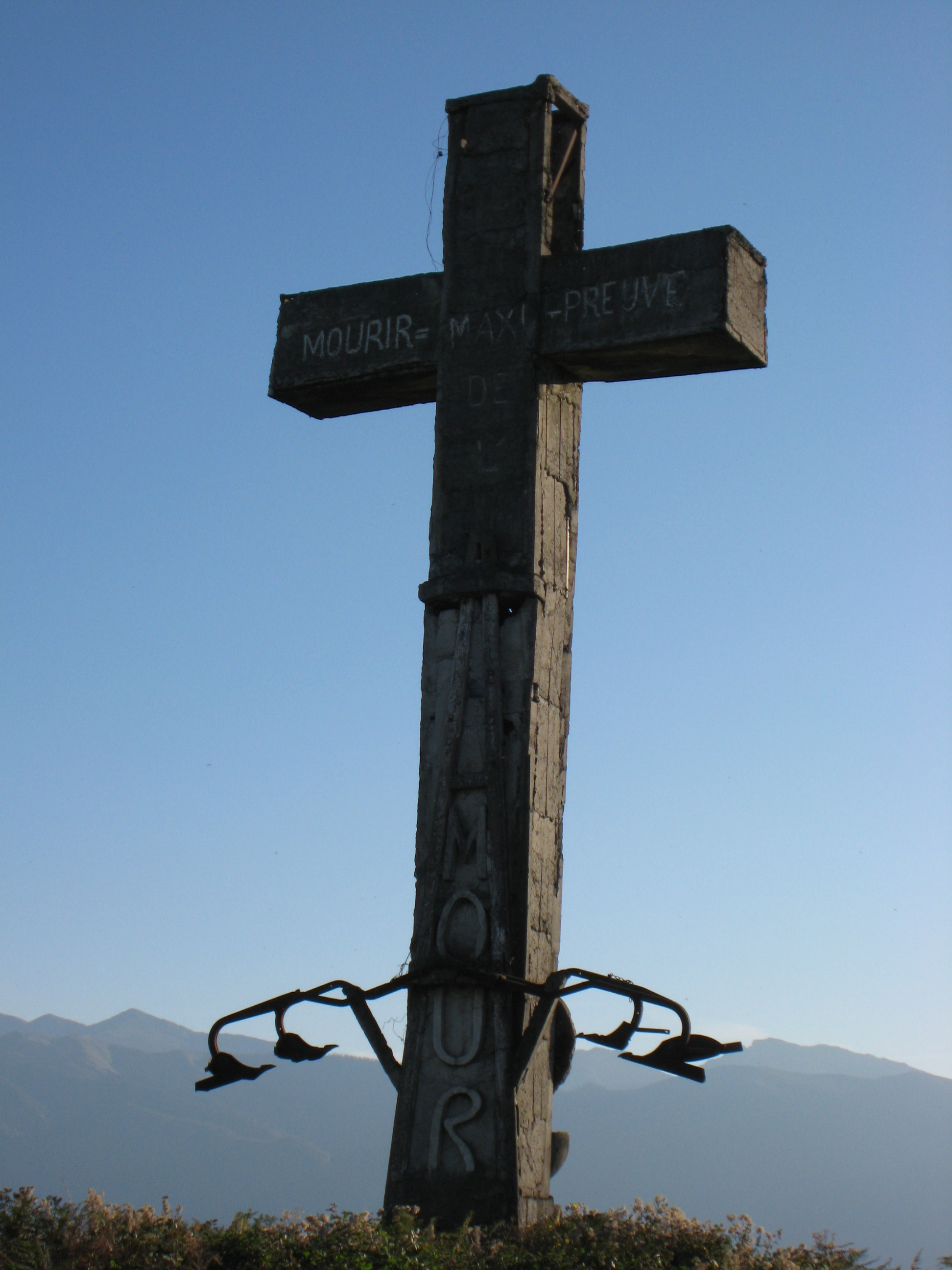
- The cross of Escou
- Location of Escou
- Location within France Location within Nouvelle-Aquitaine
- Coordinates: 43°11′00″N 0°32′07″W
- Country: France
- Region: Nouvelle-Aquitaine
- Department: Pyrénées-Atlantiques
- Arrondissement: Oloron-Sainte-Marie
- Canton: Oloron-Sainte-Marie-2
- Intercommunality: Haut Béarn

Government
  - Mayor (2020–2026): Jean Casabonne
- Area^{1}: 6.19 km^{2} (2.39 sq mi)
- Elevation: 299 m (981 ft)
- Highest elevation: 416 m (1,365 ft)
- Lowest elevation: 271 m (889 ft)
- Population (2023): 429
  - Density: 69.3/km^{2} (179/sq mi)
- Time zone: UTC+01:00 (CET)
  - Summer (DST): UTC+02:00 (CEST)
- INSEE/Postal code: 64207 /64870
- ^{1} French Land Register data, which excludes lakes, ponds, glaciers > 1 km^{2} (0.386 sq mi or 247 acres) and river estuaries.

Escou (French pronunciation: [ɛsku]; Occitan: Escor) is a commune in the Pyrénées-Atlantiques department in south-western France.

== See also ==
- Communes of the Pyrénées-Atlantiques department
