= Escout =

- Commune
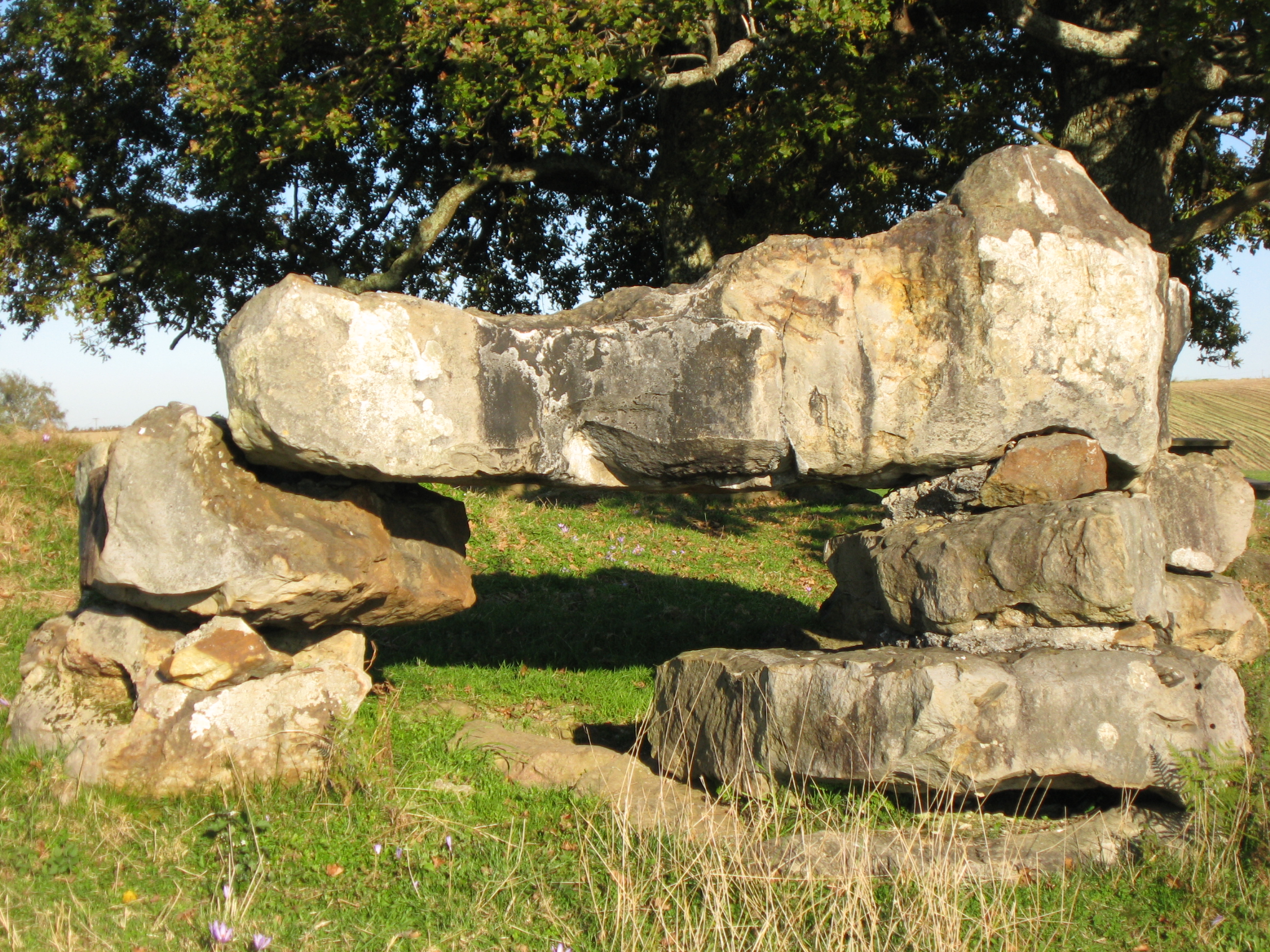
- The dolmen of Escout
- Location of Escout
- Location within France Location within Nouvelle-Aquitaine
- Coordinates: 43°11′23″N 0°33′00″W
- Country: France
- Region: Nouvelle-Aquitaine
- Department: Pyrénées-Atlantiques
- Arrondissement: Oloron-Sainte-Marie
- Canton: Oloron-Sainte-Marie-2
- Intercommunality: Haut Béarn

Government
  - Mayor (2020–2026): Sylvie Betat
- Area^{1}: 9.52 km^{2} (3.68 sq mi)
- Elevation: 275 m (902 ft)
- Highest elevation: 397 m (1,302 ft)
- Lowest elevation: 234 m (768 ft)
- Population (2023): 423
  - Density: 44.4/km^{2} (115/sq mi)
- Time zone: UTC+01:00 (CET)
  - Summer (DST): UTC+02:00 (CEST)
- INSEE/Postal code: 64209 /64870
- ^{1} French Land Register data, which excludes lakes, ponds, glaciers > 1 km^{2} (0.386 sq mi or 247 acres) and river estuaries.

Escout (French pronunciation: [ɛskut]; Occitan: Escot) is a commune in the Pyrénées-Atlantiques department in south-western France.

== See also ==
- Communes of the Pyrénées-Atlantiques department
