= Précilhon =

- Commune
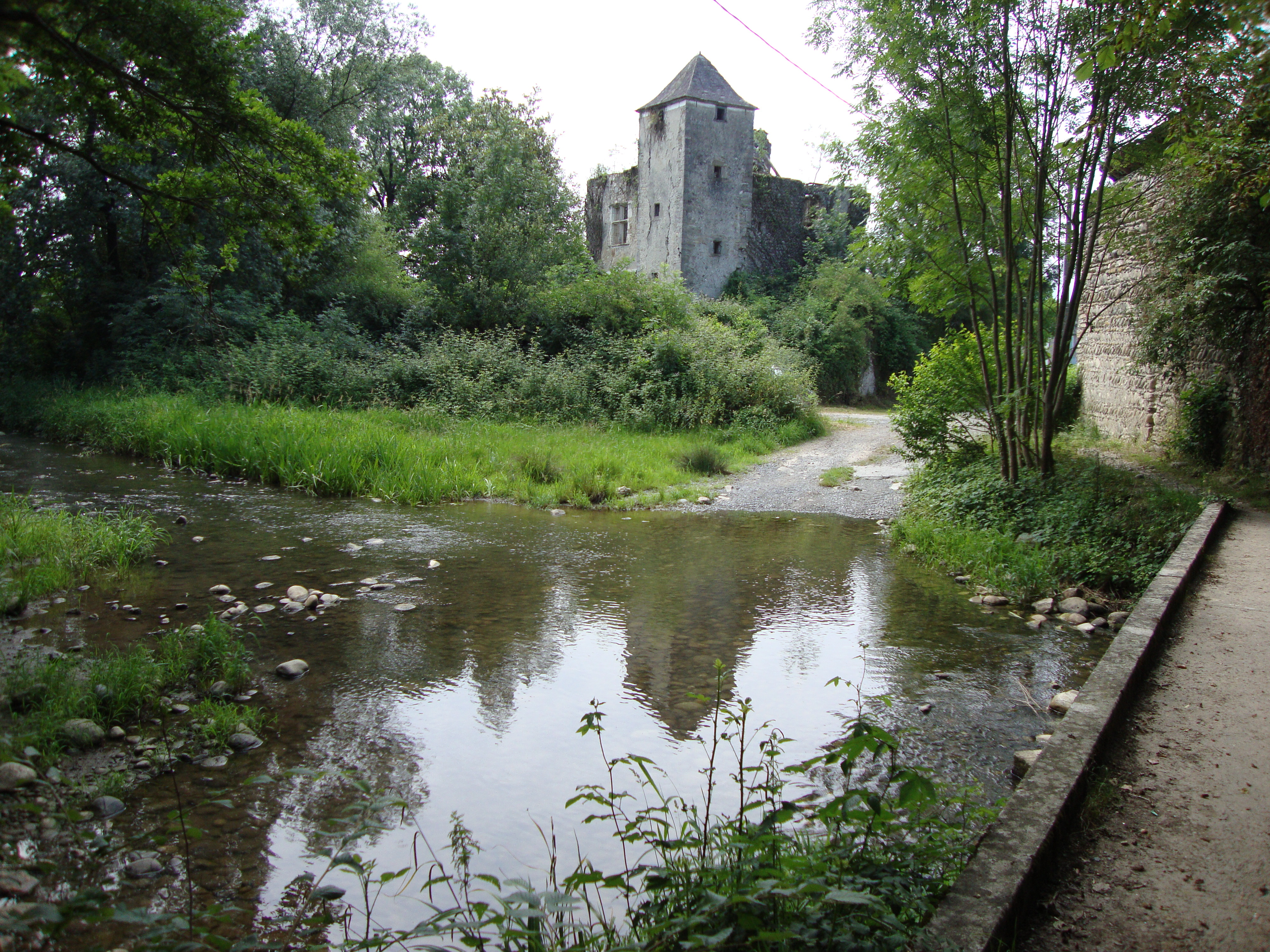
- The chateau and the Escou
- Location of Précilhon
- Location within France Location within Nouvelle-Aquitaine
- Coordinates: 43°11′46″N 0°34′41″W
- Country: France
- Region: Nouvelle-Aquitaine
- Department: Pyrénées-Atlantiques
- Arrondissement: Oloron-Sainte-Marie
- Canton: Oloron-Sainte-Marie-2

Government
  - Mayor (2020–2026): Nicolas Loustau-Chartez
- Area^{1}: 6.39 km^{2} (2.47 sq mi)
- Elevation: 282 m (925 ft)
- Highest elevation: 350 m (1,150 ft)
- Lowest elevation: 235 m (771 ft)
- Population (2023): 409
  - Density: 64.0/km^{2} (166/sq mi)
- Time zone: UTC+01:00 (CET)
  - Summer (DST): UTC+02:00 (CEST)
- INSEE/Postal code: 64460 /64400
- ^{1} French Land Register data, which excludes lakes, ponds, glaciers > 1 km^{2} (0.386 sq mi or 247 acres) and river estuaries.

Précilhon (French pronunciation: [pʁesijɔ̃]; Occitan: Precilhon) is a commune in the Pyrénées-Atlantiques department in south-western France.

== See also ==
- Communes of the Pyrénées-Atlantiques department
