= Ledeuix =

- Commune
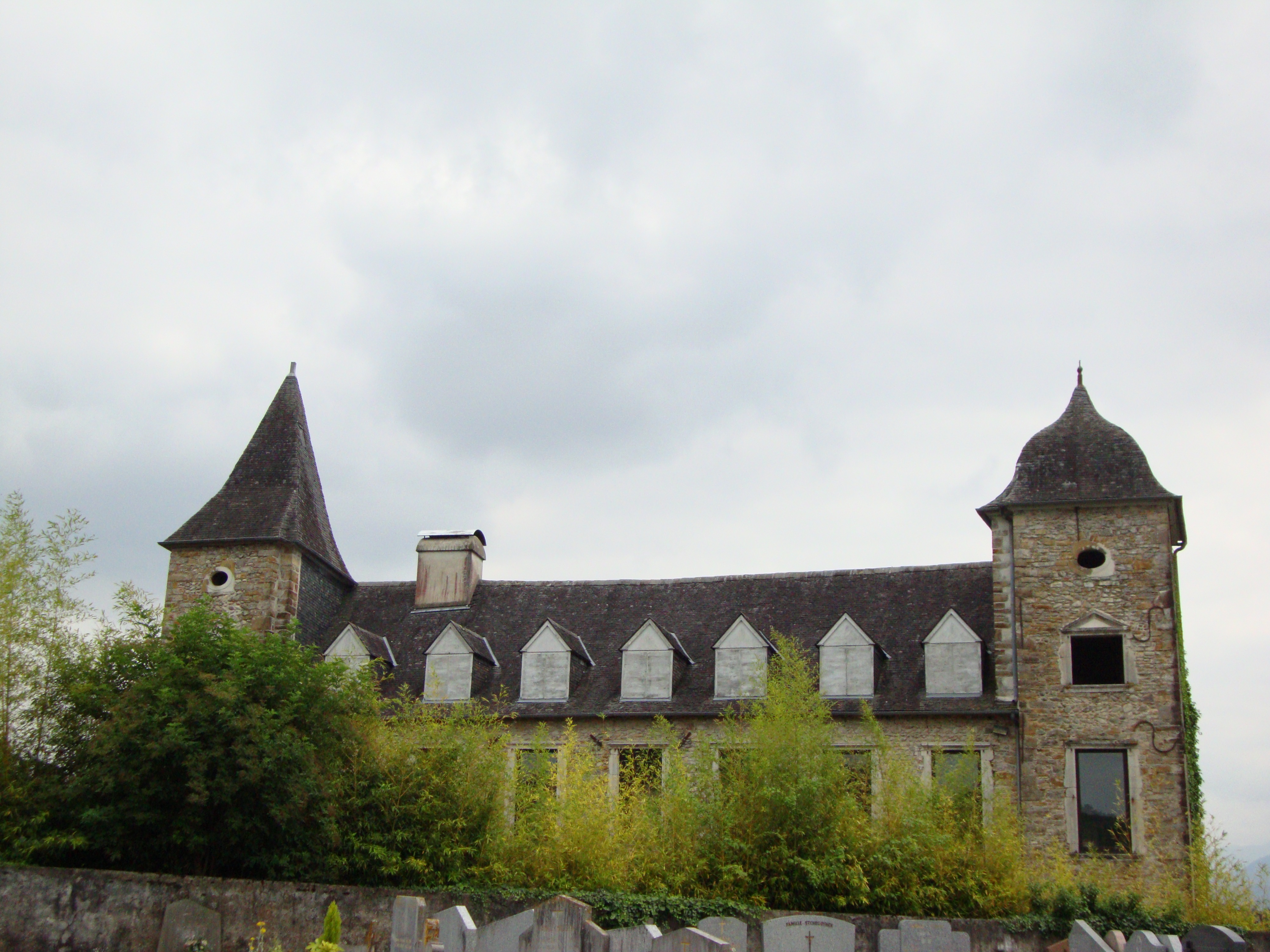
- The chateau of Ledeuix
- Location of Ledeuix
- Location within France Location within Nouvelle-Aquitaine
- Coordinates: 43°13′02″N 0°37′10″W
- Country: France
- Region: Nouvelle-Aquitaine
- Department: Pyrénées-Atlantiques
- Arrondissement: Oloron-Sainte-Marie
- Canton: Oloron-Sainte-Marie-2
- Intercommunality: Haut Béarn

Government
  - Mayor (2020–2026): Bernard Aurisset
- Area^{1}: 13.52 km^{2} (5.22 sq mi)
- Elevation: 263 m (863 ft)
- Highest elevation: 341 m (1,119 ft)
- Lowest elevation: 185 m (607 ft)
- Population (2023): 1,029
  - Density: 76.11/km^{2} (197.1/sq mi)
- Time zone: UTC+01:00 (CET)
  - Summer (DST): UTC+02:00 (CEST)
- INSEE/Postal code: 64328 /64400
- ^{1} French Land Register data, which excludes lakes, ponds, glaciers > 1 km^{2} (0.386 sq mi or 247 acres) and river estuaries.

Ledeuix (French pronunciation: [lədøʃ] or [ledøʃ]; also Lédeuix; Occitan: Laduish) is a commune in the Pyrénées-Atlantiques department in south-western France.

== See also ==
- Communes of the Pyrénées-Atlantiques department
