= Herrère =

- Commune
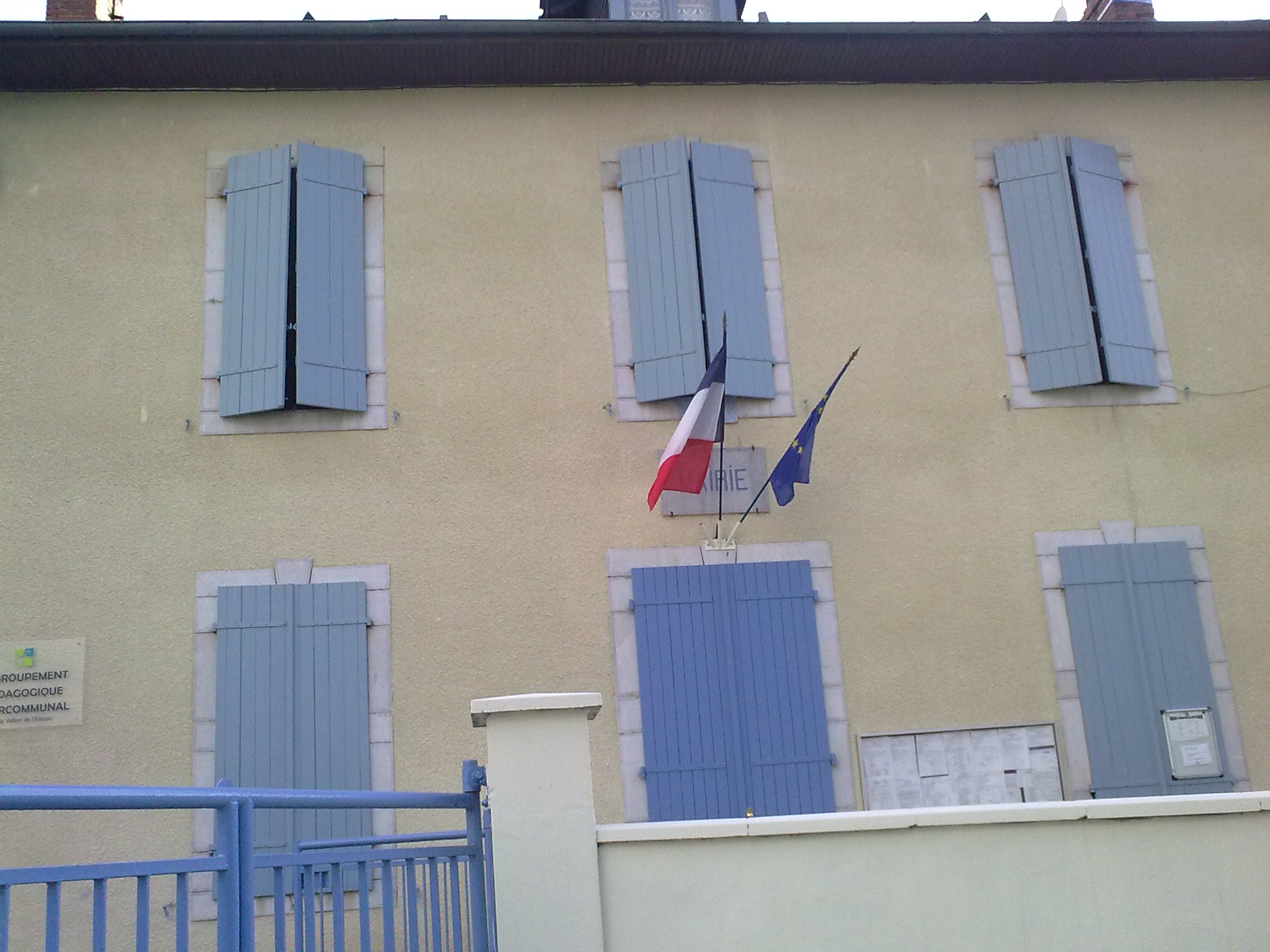
- The town hall of Herrère
- Location of Herrère
- Location within France Location within Nouvelle-Aquitaine
- Coordinates: 43°10′11″N 0°32′19″W
- Country: France
- Region: Nouvelle-Aquitaine
- Department: Pyrénées-Atlantiques
- Arrondissement: Oloron-Sainte-Marie
- Canton: Oloron-Sainte-Marie-2
- Intercommunality: Haut Béarn

Government
  - Mayor (2020–2026): Catherine Garcès
- Area^{1}: 8.93 km^{2} (3.45 sq mi)
- Elevation: 298 m (978 ft)
- Highest elevation: 342 m (1,122 ft)
- Lowest elevation: 234 m (768 ft)
- Population (2023): 397
  - Density: 44.5/km^{2} (115/sq mi)
- Time zone: UTC+01:00 (CET)
  - Summer (DST): UTC+02:00 (CEST)
- INSEE/Postal code: 64261 /64680
- ^{1} French Land Register data, which excludes lakes, ponds, glaciers > 1 km^{2} (0.386 sq mi or 247 acres) and river estuaries.

Herrère (French pronunciation: [ɛʁɛʁ]; Occitan: Herrèra) is a commune in the Pyrénées-Atlantiques department in south-western France.

== See also ==
- Communes of the Pyrénées-Atlantiques department
