= Eysus =

- Commune
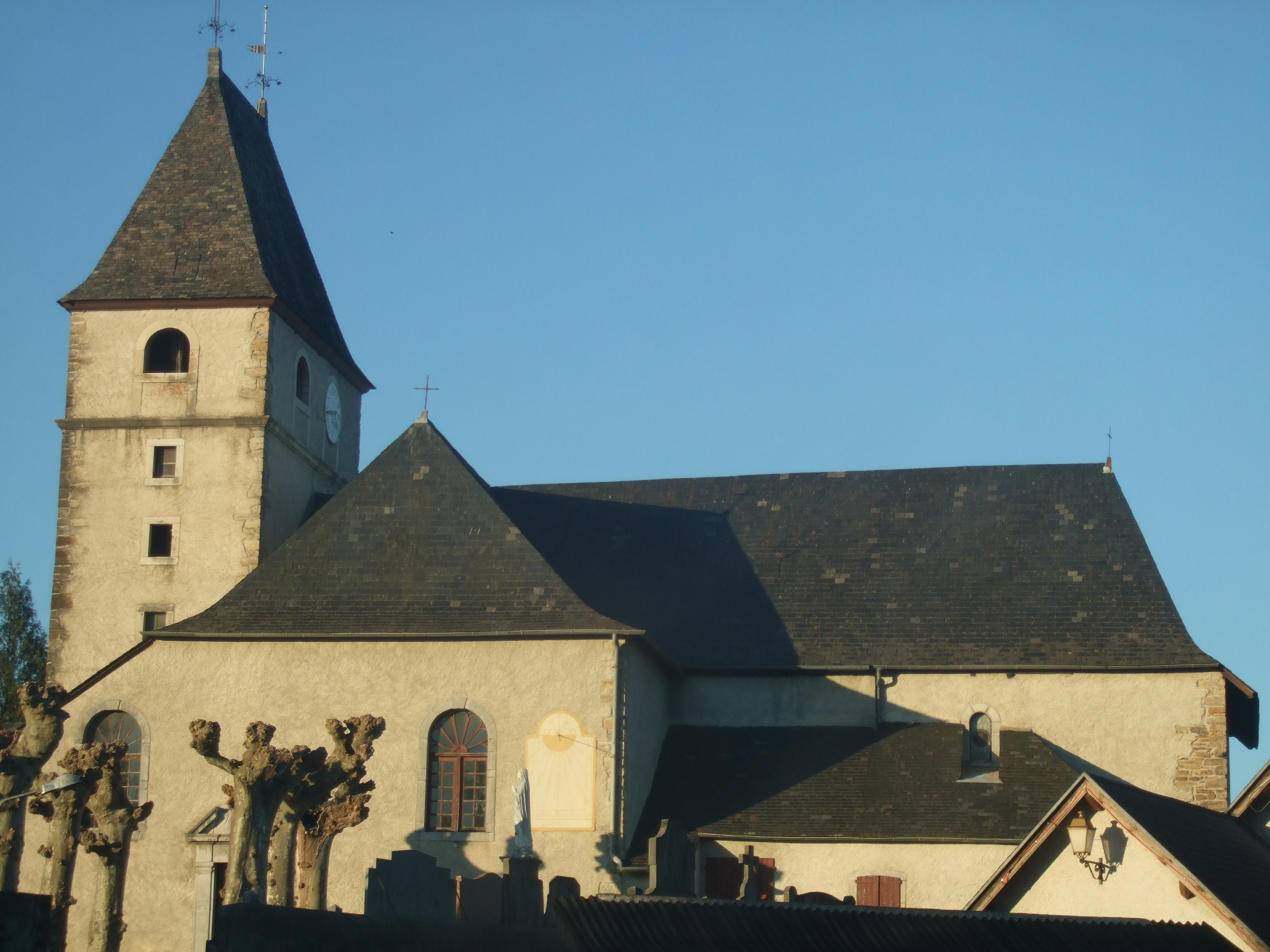
- The church of Eysus
- Location of Eysus
- Location within France Location within Nouvelle-Aquitaine
- Coordinates: 43°08′24″N 0°35′14″W
- Country: France
- Region: Nouvelle-Aquitaine
- Department: Pyrénées-Atlantiques
- Arrondissement: Oloron-Sainte-Marie
- Canton: Oloron-Sainte-Marie-1
- Intercommunality: Haut Béarn

Government
  - Mayor (2020–2026): Marie Echepare
- Area^{1}: 6.72 km^{2} (2.59 sq mi)
- Elevation: 302 m (991 ft)
- Highest elevation: 416 m (1,365 ft)
- Lowest elevation: 236 m (774 ft)
- Population (2023): 625
  - Density: 93.0/km^{2} (241/sq mi)
- Time zone: UTC+01:00 (CET)
  - Summer (DST): UTC+02:00 (CEST)
- INSEE/Postal code: 64224 /64400
- ^{1} French Land Register data, which excludes lakes, ponds, glaciers > 1 km^{2} (0.386 sq mi or 247 acres) and river estuaries.

Eysus (French pronunciation: [ɛizys]; Occitan: Eisús) is a commune in the Pyrénées-Atlantiques department in south-western France.

== See also ==
- Communes of the Pyrénées-Atlantiques department
