= Poey-d'Oloron =

- Commune
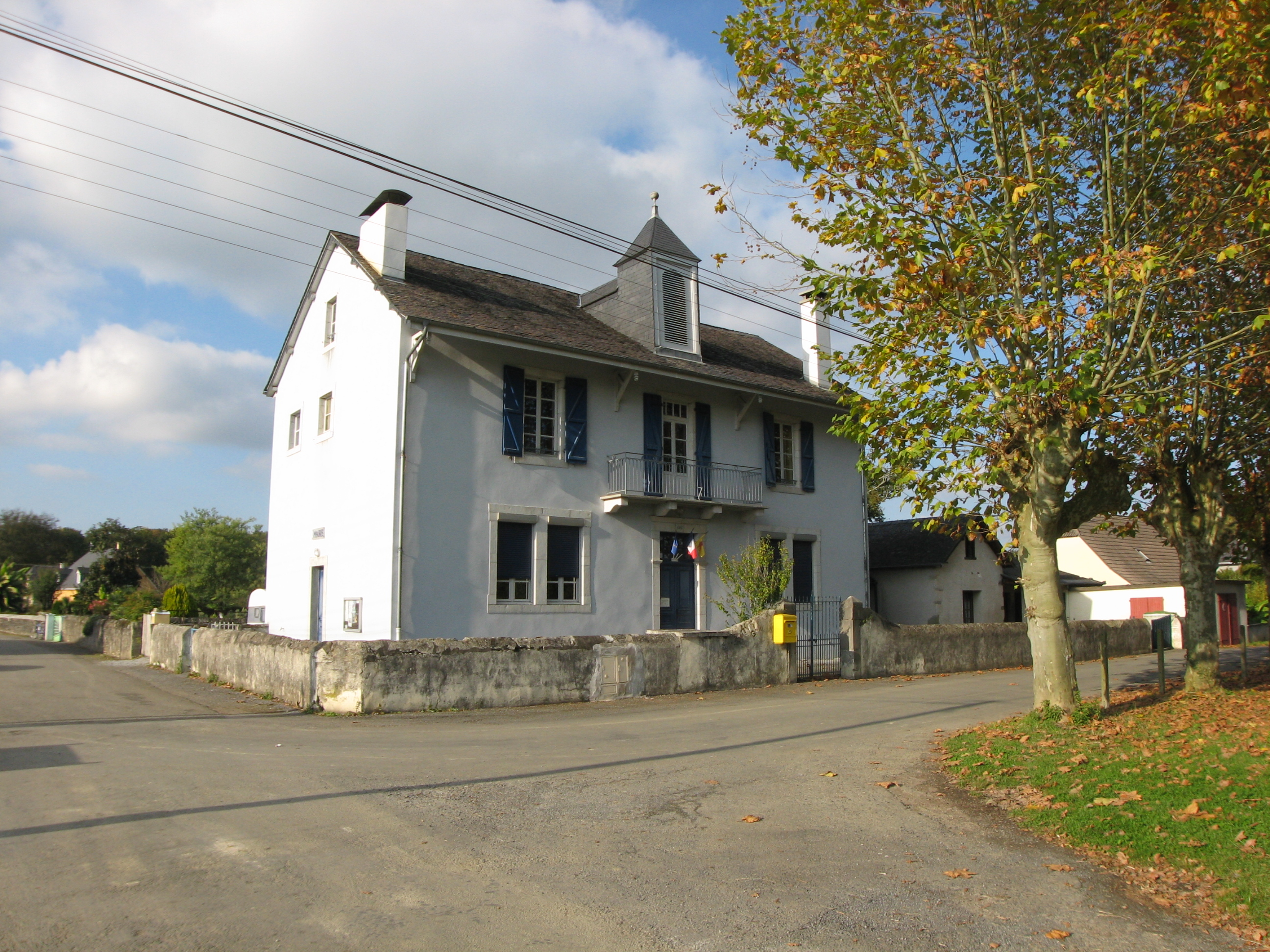
- The town hall of Poey-d'Oloron
- Location of Poey-d'Oloron
- Location within France Location within Nouvelle-Aquitaine
- Coordinates: 43°14′53″N 0°39′42″W
- Country: France
- Region: Nouvelle-Aquitaine
- Department: Pyrénées-Atlantiques
- Arrondissement: Oloron-Sainte-Marie
- Canton: Oloron-Sainte-Marie-2
- Intercommunality: Haut Béarn

Government
  - Mayor (2020–2026): Élisabeth Miqueu
- Area^{1}: 4.79 km^{2} (1.85 sq mi)
- Elevation: 220 m (720 ft)
- Highest elevation: 254 m (833 ft)
- Lowest elevation: 160 m (520 ft)
- Population (2023): 163
  - Density: 34.0/km^{2} (88.1/sq mi)
- Time zone: UTC+01:00 (CET)
  - Summer (DST): UTC+02:00 (CEST)
- INSEE/Postal code: 64449 /64400
- ^{1} French Land Register data, which excludes lakes, ponds, glaciers > 1 km^{2} (0.386 sq mi or 247 acres) and river estuaries.

Poey-d'Oloron (French pronunciation: [pɔɛ dɔlɔʁɔ̃]) is a commune in the Pyrénées-Atlantiques department in south-western France.

== See also ==
- Communes of the Pyrénées-Atlantiques department
