= Goès =

- Commune
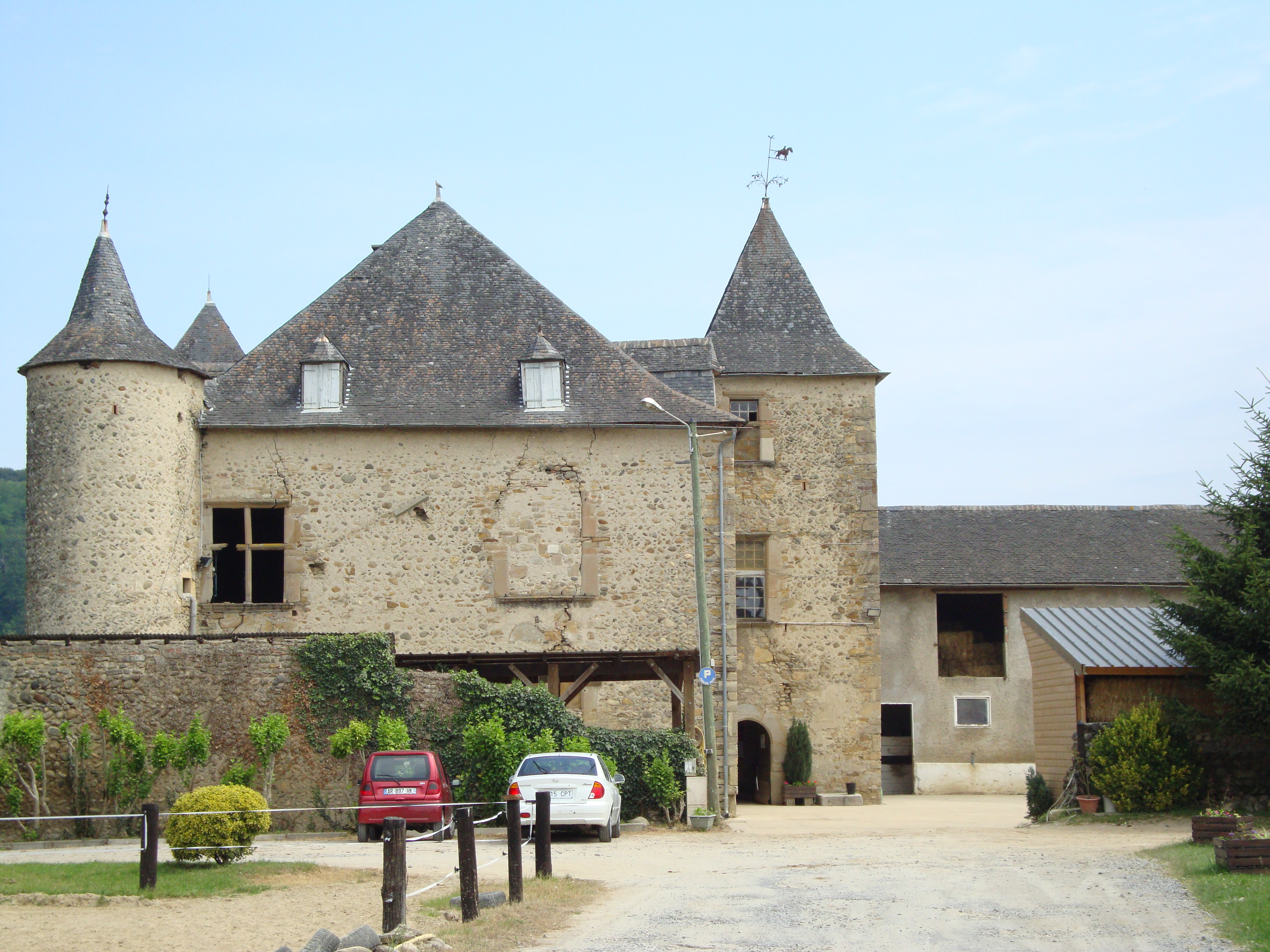
- The chateau of Goès
- Location of Goès
- Location within France Location within Nouvelle-Aquitaine
- Coordinates: 43°12′00″N 0°34′59″W
- Country: France
- Region: Nouvelle-Aquitaine
- Department: Pyrénées-Atlantiques
- Arrondissement: Oloron-Sainte-Marie
- Canton: Oloron-Sainte-Marie-2
- Intercommunality: Haut Béarn

Government
  - Mayor (2020–2026): Didier Loustau
- Area^{1}: 4.76 km^{2} (1.84 sq mi)
- Elevation: 282 m (925 ft)
- Population (2023): 520
  - Density: 110/km^{2} (280/sq mi)
- Time zone: UTC+01:00 (CET)
  - Summer (DST): UTC+02:00 (CEST)
- INSEE/Postal code: 64245 /64400
- ^{1} French Land Register data, which excludes lakes, ponds, glaciers > 1 km^{2} (0.386 sq mi or 247 acres) and river estuaries.

Goès (French pronunciation: [ɡɔɛs]; Occitan: Güèrs) is a commune in the Pyrénées-Atlantiques department in south-western France.

== See also ==
- Communes of the Pyrénées-Atlantiques department
