= Béost =

- Commune
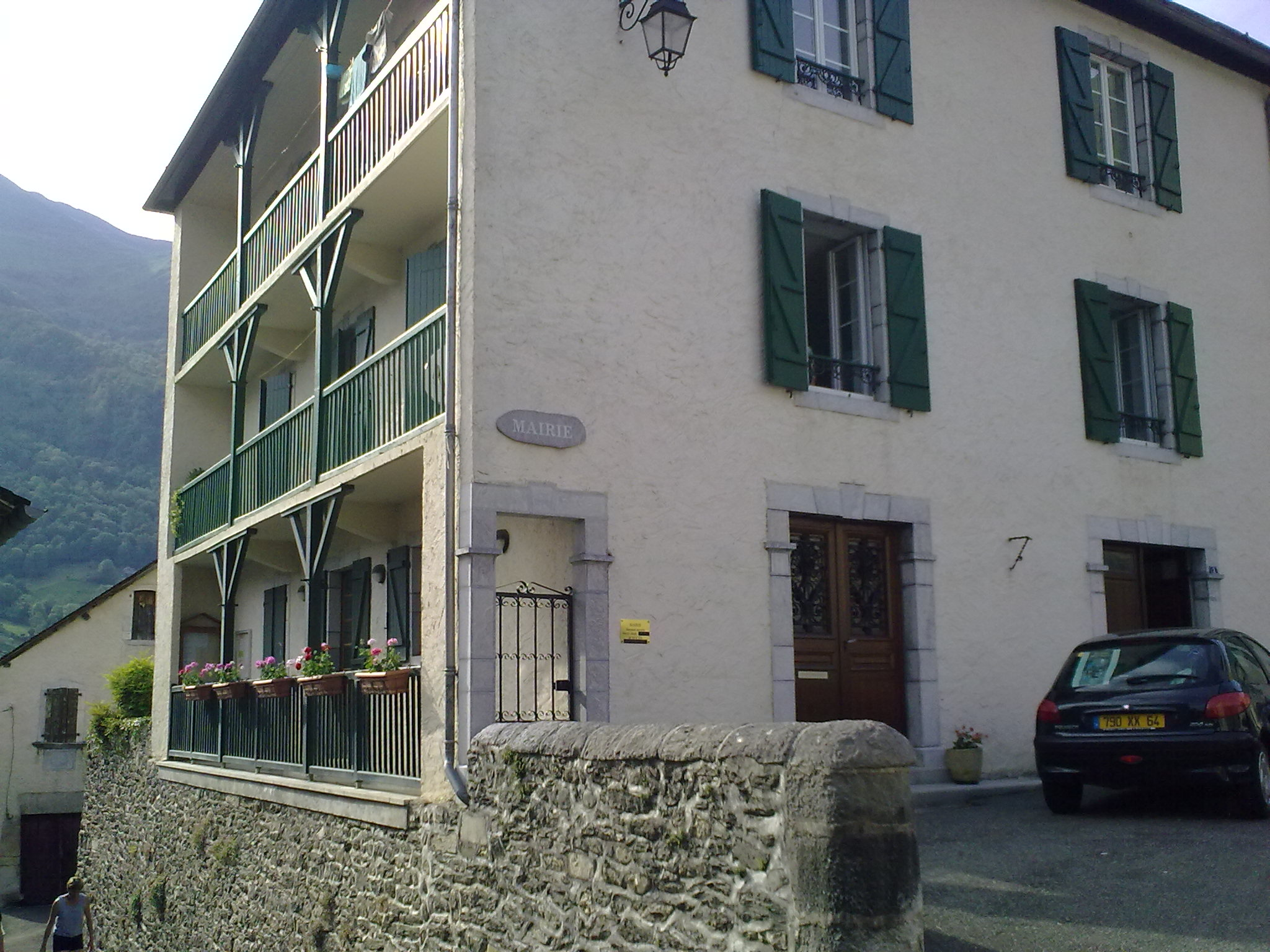
- Town hall
- Location of Béost
- Location within France Location within Nouvelle-Aquitaine
- Coordinates: 42°59′38″N 0°24′46″W
- Country: France
- Region: Nouvelle-Aquitaine
- Department: Pyrénées-Atlantiques
- Arrondissement: Oloron-Sainte-Marie
- Canton: Oloron-Sainte-Marie-2
- Intercommunality: Vallée d'Ossau

Government
  - Mayor (2020–2026): Jean-François Regnier
- Area^{1}: 43.50 km^{2} (16.80 sq mi)
- Elevation: 530 m (1,740 ft)
- Highest elevation: 2,688 m (8,819 ft)
- Lowest elevation: 484 m (1,588 ft)
- Population (2023): 231
  - Density: 5.31/km^{2} (13.8/sq mi)
- Time zone: UTC+01:00 (CET)
  - Summer (DST): UTC+02:00 (CEST)
- INSEE/Postal code: 64110 /64440
- ^{1} French Land Register data, which excludes lakes, ponds, glaciers > 1 km^{2} (0.386 sq mi or 247 acres) and river estuaries.

Béost (French pronunciation: [beɔst]; Gascon: Biost) is a commune of the Pyrénées-Atlantiques department in southwestern France.

== See also ==
- Ossau Valley
- Communes of the Pyrénées-Atlantiques department
