= Gère-Bélesten =

- Commune
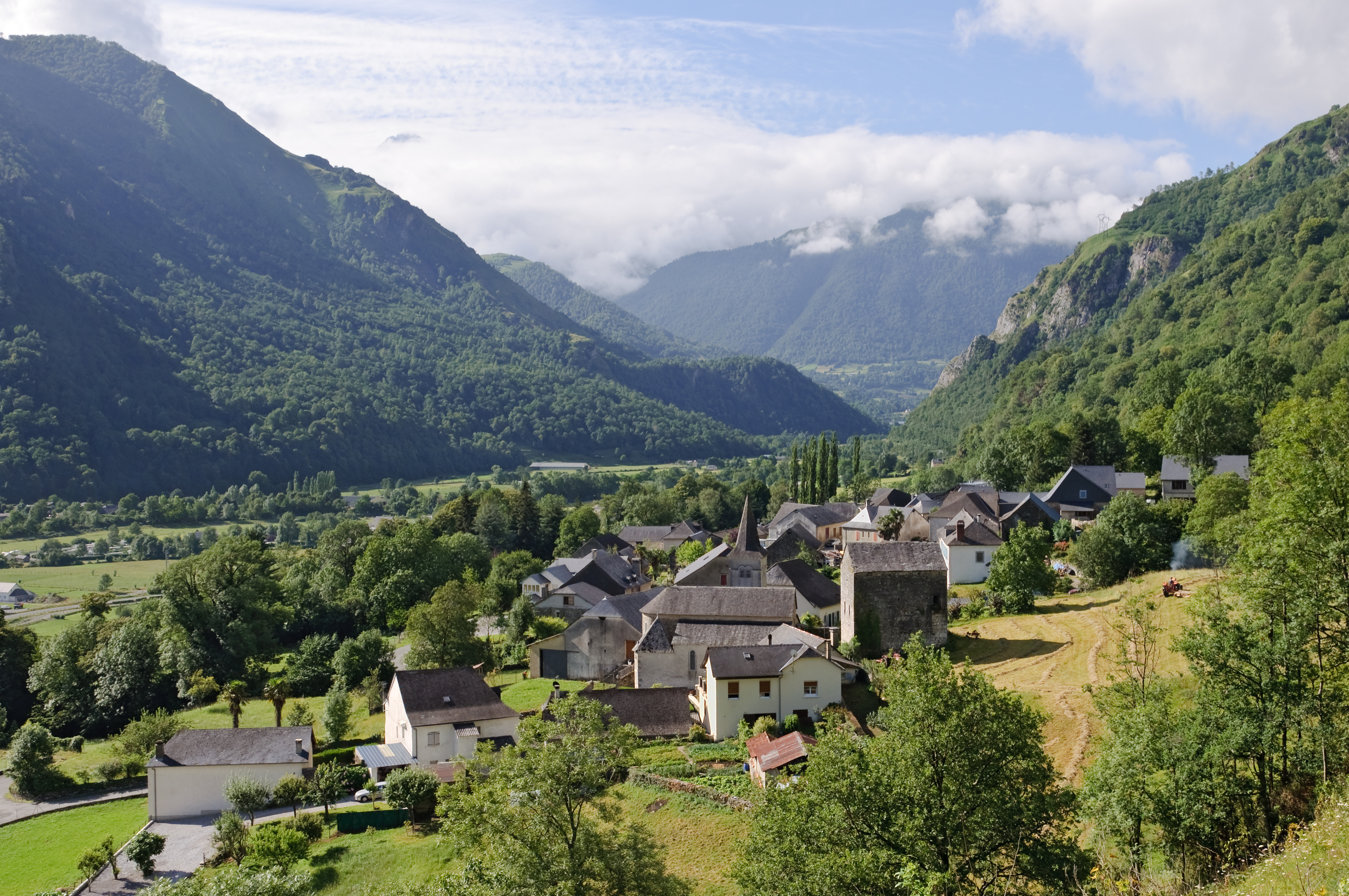
- A view of the village of Gère
- Location of Gère-Bélesten
- Location within France Location within Nouvelle-Aquitaine
- Coordinates: 43°01′34″N 0°25′31″W
- Country: France
- Region: Nouvelle-Aquitaine
- Department: Pyrénées-Atlantiques
- Arrondissement: Oloron-Sainte-Marie
- Canton: Oloron-Sainte-Marie-2
- Intercommunality: Vallée d'Ossau

Government
  - Mayor (2020–2026): Yves Maysounabe
- Area^{1}: 12.82 km^{2} (4.95 sq mi)
- Elevation: 464 m (1,522 ft)
- Highest elevation: 1,898 m (6,227 ft)
- Lowest elevation: 439 m (1,440 ft)
- Population (2023): 189
  - Density: 14.7/km^{2} (38.2/sq mi)
- Time zone: UTC+01:00 (CET)
  - Summer (DST): UTC+02:00 (CEST)
- INSEE/Postal code: 64240 /64260
- ^{1} French Land Register data, which excludes lakes, ponds, glaciers > 1 km^{2} (0.386 sq mi or 247 acres) and river estuaries.

Gère-Bélesten is a commune in the Pyrénées-Atlantiques department in south-western France.

== See also ==
- Ossau Valley
- Communes of the Pyrénées-Atlantiques department
