= Canton of Oloron-Sainte-Marie-2 =

French canton

Coordinates: 43.20°N 0.60°W

The canton of Oloron-Sainte-Marie-2 is an administrative division of the Pyrénées-Atlantiques department, southwestern France. It was created at the French canton reorganisation which came into effect in March 2015. Its seat is in Oloron-Sainte-Marie.

It consists of the following communes:

1. Arudy
2. Aste-Béon
3. Béost
4. Bescat
5. Bielle
6. Bilhères
7. Buziet
8. Buzy
9. Castet
10. Eaux-Bonnes
11. Escou
12. Escout
13. Estialescq
14. Estos
15. Gère-Bélesten
16. Goès
17. Herrère
18. Izeste
19. Laruns
20. Lasseube
21. Lasseubetat
22. Ledeuix
23. Louvie-Juzon
24. Louvie-Soubiron
25. Lys
26. Ogeu-les-Bains
27. Oloron-Sainte-Marie (partly)
28. Poey-d'Oloron
29. Précilhon
30. Rébénacq
31. Sainte-Colome
32. Saucède
33. Sévignacq-Meyracq
34. Verdets
