= Bilhères =

- Commune
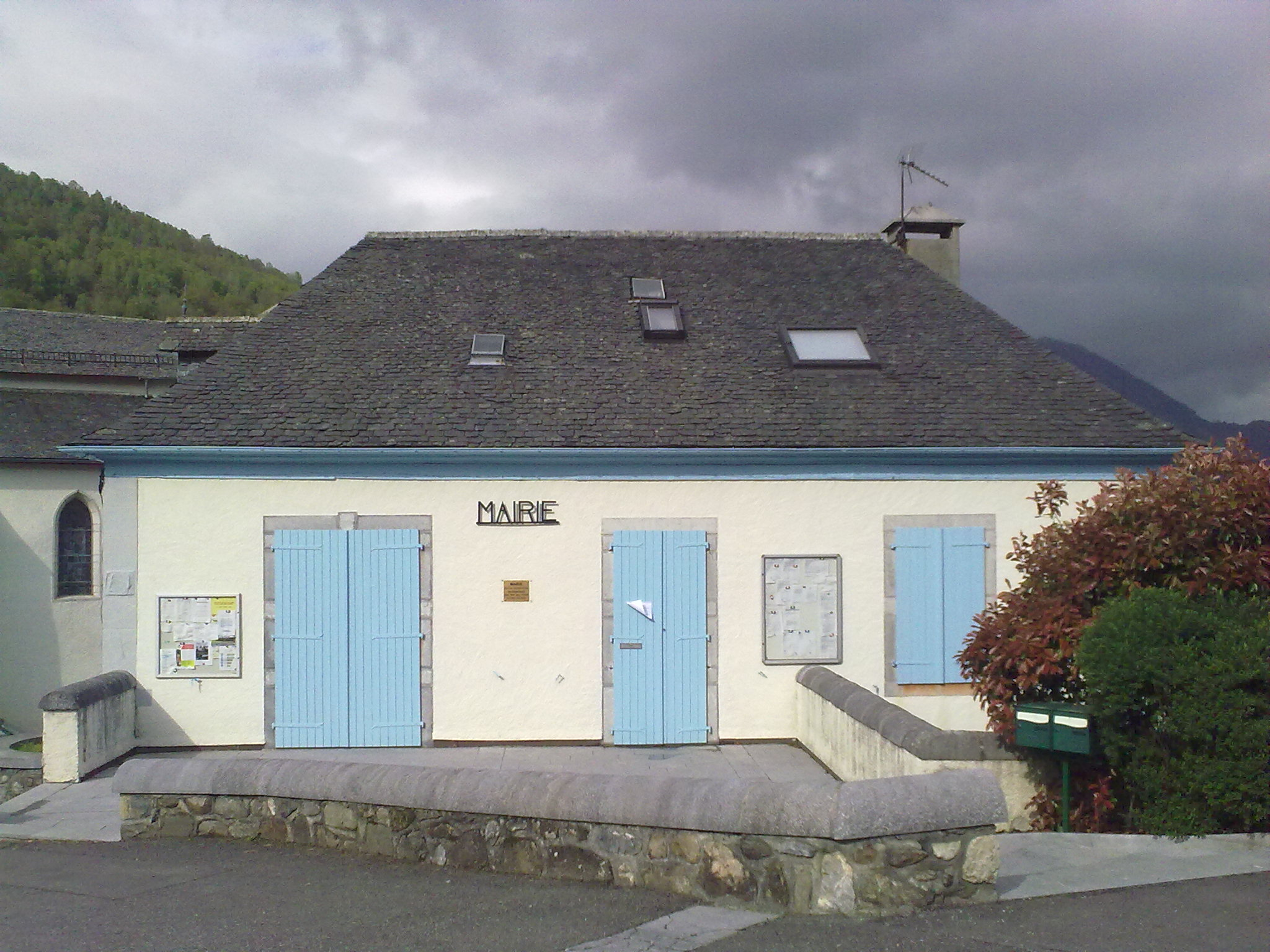
- Town hall
- Location of Bilhères
- Location within France Location within Nouvelle-Aquitaine
- Coordinates: 43°03′34″N 0°26′50″W
- Country: France
- Region: Nouvelle-Aquitaine
- Department: Pyrénées-Atlantiques
- Arrondissement: Oloron-Sainte-Marie
- Canton: Oloron-Sainte-Marie-2
- Intercommunality: Vallée d'Ossau

Government
  - Mayor (2020–2026): Bernard Bonnemason
- Area^{1}: 17.19 km^{2} (6.64 sq mi)
- Elevation: 650 m (2,130 ft)
- Highest elevation: 1,817 m (5,961 ft)
- Lowest elevation: 480 m (1,570 ft)
- Population (2023): 154
  - Density: 8.96/km^{2} (23.2/sq mi)
- Time zone: UTC+01:00 (CET)
  - Summer (DST): UTC+02:00 (CEST)
- INSEE/Postal code: 64128 /64260
- ^{1} French Land Register data, which excludes lakes, ponds, glaciers > 1 km^{2} (0.386 sq mi or 247 acres) and river estuaries.

Bilhères (French pronunciation: [bijɛʁ]; Occitan: Vilhèras) is a commune of the Pyrénées-Atlantiques department in southwestern France.

== See also ==
- Ossau Valley
- Communes of the Pyrénées-Atlantiques department
