= Estos =

- Commune
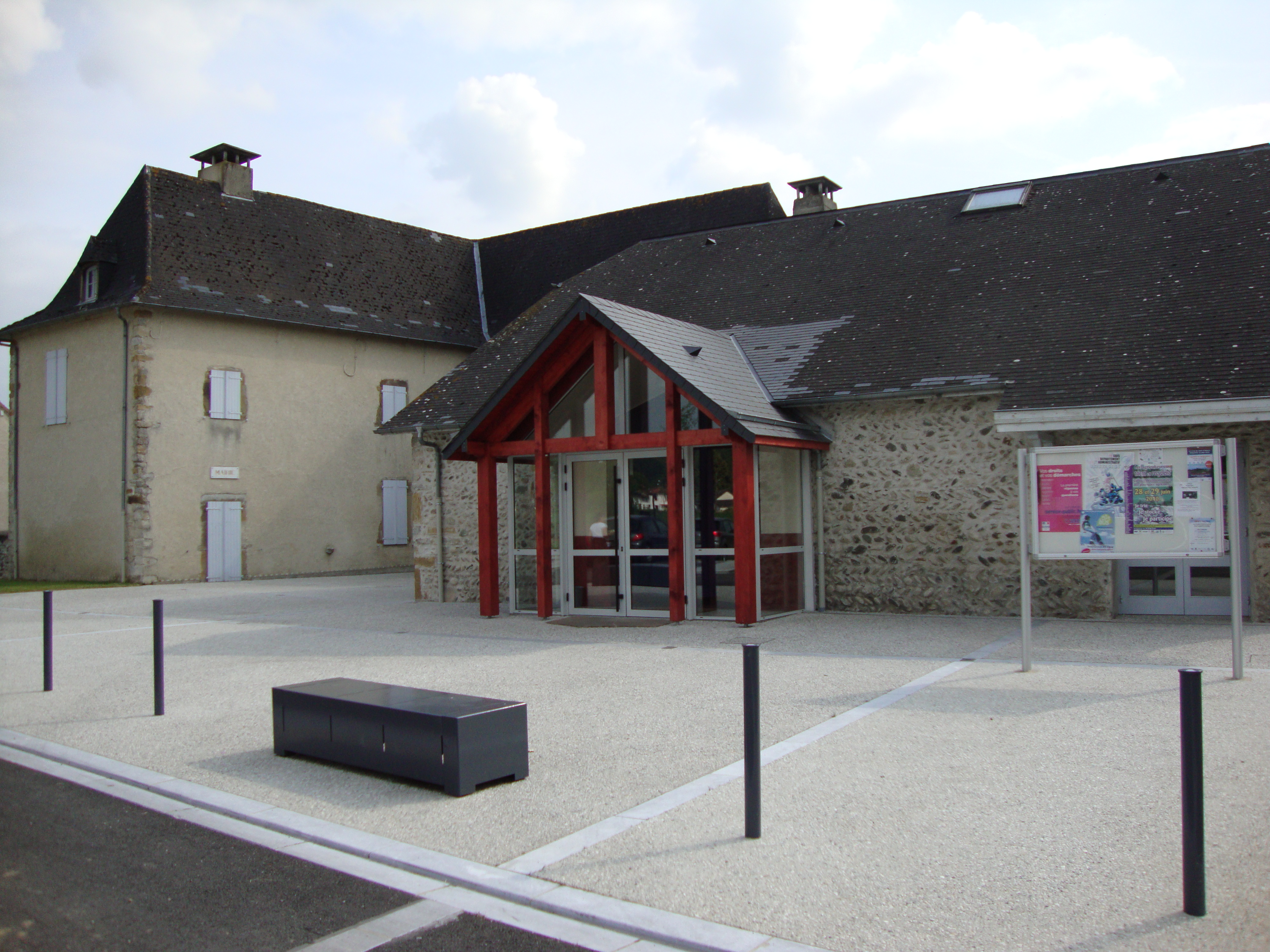
- The town hall of Estos
- Location of Estos
- Location within France Location within Nouvelle-Aquitaine
- Coordinates: 43°12′33″N 0°36′38″W
- Country: France
- Region: Nouvelle-Aquitaine
- Department: Pyrénées-Atlantiques
- Arrondissement: Oloron-Sainte-Marie
- Canton: Oloron-Sainte-Marie-2
- Intercommunality: Haut Béarn

Government
  - Mayor (2020–2026): Philippe Sansamat
- Area^{1}: 3.22 km^{2} (1.24 sq mi)
- Elevation: 263 m (863 ft)
- Highest elevation: 346 m (1,135 ft)
- Lowest elevation: 198 m (650 ft)
- Population (2023): 481
  - Density: 149/km^{2} (387/sq mi)
- Time zone: UTC+01:00 (CET)
  - Summer (DST): UTC+02:00 (CEST)
- INSEE/Postal code: 64220 /64400
- ^{1} French Land Register data, which excludes lakes, ponds, glaciers > 1 km^{2} (0.386 sq mi or 247 acres) and river estuaries.

Estos (French pronunciation: [ɛstɔs]; Occitan: Estòs) is a commune in the Pyrénées-Atlantiques department in south-western France.

== See also ==
- Communes of the Pyrénées-Atlantiques department
