= Buziet =

- Commune
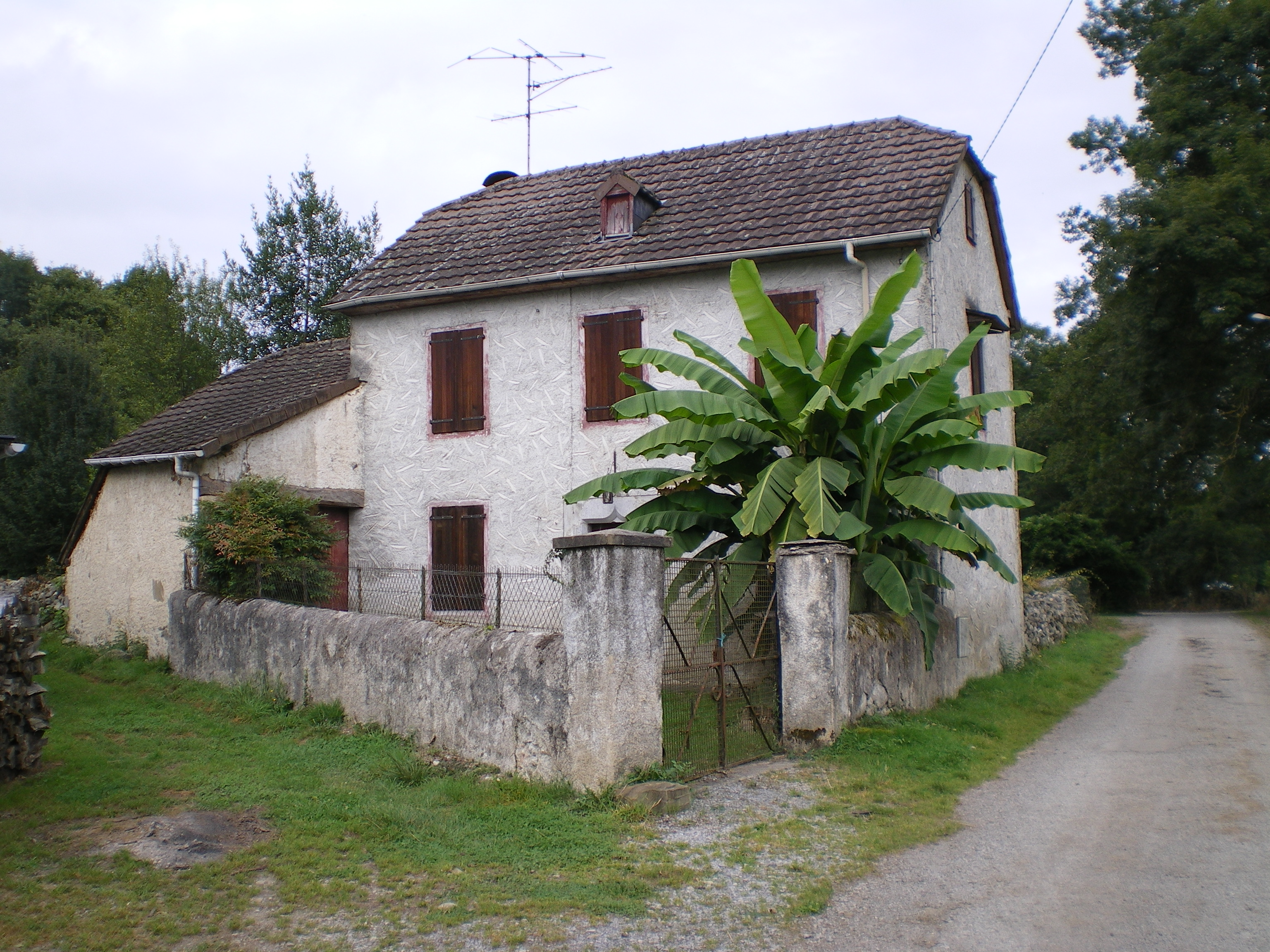
- A characteristic house of Buziet
- Location of Buziet
- Location within France Location within Nouvelle-Aquitaine
- Coordinates: 43°08′20″N 0°28′29″W
- Country: France
- Region: Nouvelle-Aquitaine
- Department: Pyrénées-Atlantiques
- Arrondissement: Oloron-Sainte-Marie
- Canton: Oloron-Sainte-Marie-2

Government
  - Mayor (2020–2026): Fabienne Touvard
- Area^{1}: 8.18 km^{2} (3.16 sq mi)
- Elevation: 357 m (1,171 ft)
- Highest elevation: 455 m (1,493 ft)
- Lowest elevation: 310 m (1,020 ft)
- Population (2023): 479
  - Density: 58.6/km^{2} (152/sq mi)
- Time zone: UTC+01:00 (CET)
  - Summer (DST): UTC+02:00 (CEST)
- INSEE/Postal code: 64156 /64680
- ^{1} French Land Register data, which excludes lakes, ponds, glaciers > 1 km^{2} (0.386 sq mi or 247 acres) and river estuaries.

Buziet (French pronunciation: [byzjɛ]; Occitan: Busiet) is a commune in the Pyrénées-Atlantiques department in southwestern France.

== See also ==
- Communes of the Pyrénées-Atlantiques department
