= Louvie-Soubiron =

- Commune
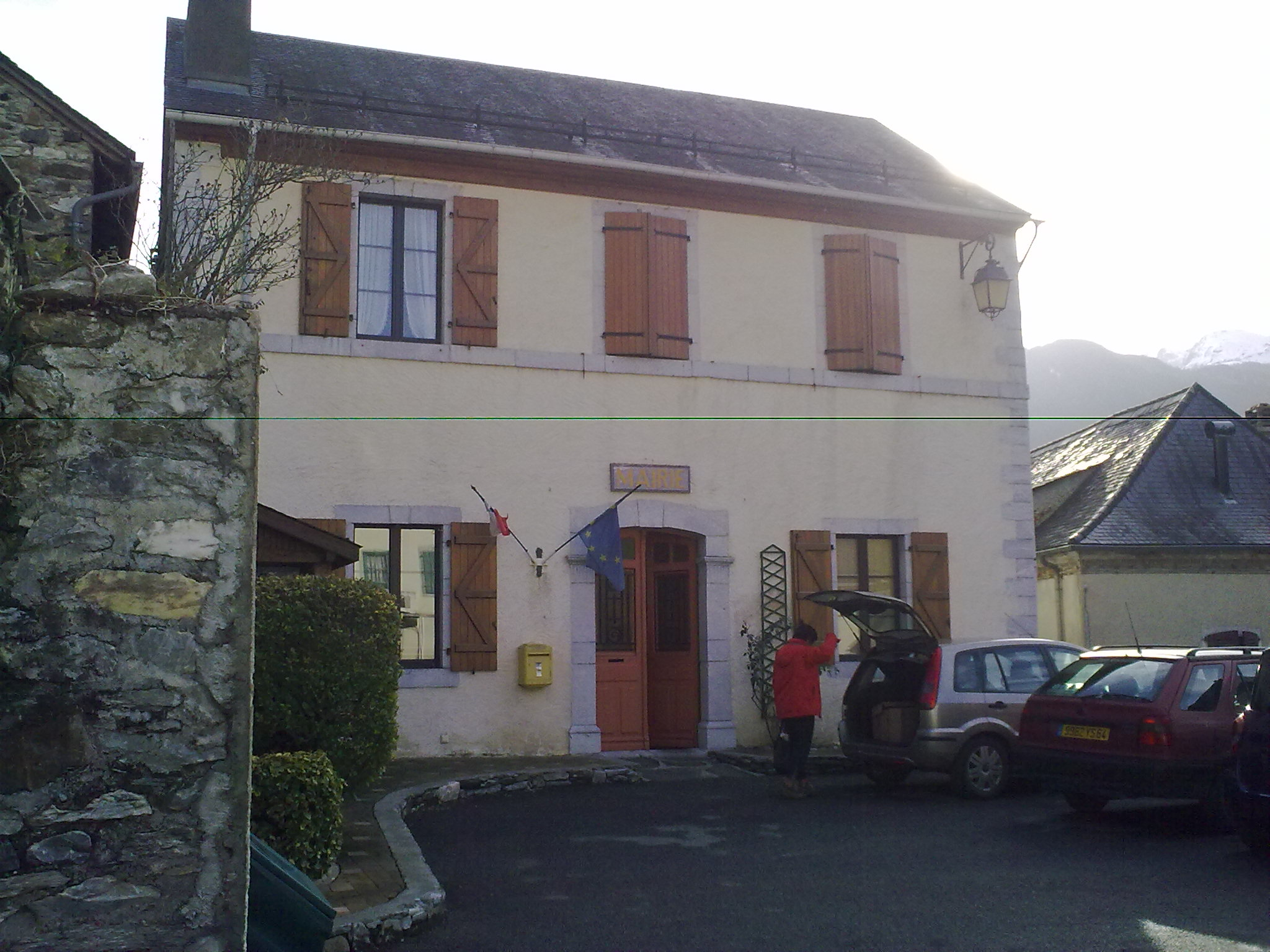
- Town Hall
- Location of Louvie-Soubiron
- Location within France Location within Nouvelle-Aquitaine
- Coordinates: 43°00′01″N 0°24′45″W
- Country: France
- Region: Nouvelle-Aquitaine
- Department: Pyrénées-Atlantiques
- Arrondissement: Oloron-Sainte-Marie
- Canton: Oloron-Sainte-Marie-2
- Intercommunality: Vallée d'Ossau

Government
  - Mayor (2020–2026): Gérard Sarrailh
- Area^{1}: 26.66 km^{2} (10.29 sq mi)
- Elevation: 600 m (2,000 ft)
- Highest elevation: 2,038 m (6,686 ft)
- Lowest elevation: 457 m (1,499 ft)
- Population (2023): 133
  - Density: 4.99/km^{2} (12.9/sq mi)
- Time zone: UTC+01:00 (CET)
  - Summer (DST): UTC+02:00 (CEST)
- INSEE/Postal code: 64354 /64440
- ^{1} French Land Register data, which excludes lakes, ponds, glaciers > 1 km^{2} (0.386 sq mi or 247 acres) and river estuaries.

Louvie-Soubiron (French pronunciation: [luvi subiʁɔ̃]; Lobièr sobiran or Lobièr de Haut in occitan) is a commune in the Pyrénées-Atlantiques department in south-western France.

== See also ==
- Ossau Valley
- Communes of the Pyrénées-Atlantiques department
