= Rébénacq =

- Commune
- Location of Rébénacq
- Location within France Location within Nouvelle-Aquitaine
- Coordinates: 43°10′N 0°23′W
- Country: France
- Region: Nouvelle-Aquitaine
- Department: Pyrénées-Atlantiques
- Arrondissement: Oloron-Sainte-Marie
- Canton: Oloron-Sainte-Marie-2

Government
  - Mayor (2020–2026): Alain Sanz
- Area^{1}: 10.50 km^{2} (4.05 sq mi)
- Elevation: 350 m (1,150 ft)
- Highest elevation: 516 m (1,693 ft)
- Lowest elevation: 257 m (843 ft)
- Population (2023): 639
  - Density: 60.9/km^{2} (158/sq mi)
- Time zone: UTC+01:00 (CET)
  - Summer (DST): UTC+02:00 (CEST)
- INSEE/Postal code: 64463 /64260
- ^{1} French Land Register data, which excludes lakes, ponds, glaciers > 1 km^{2} (0.386 sq mi or 247 acres) and river estuaries.

Rébénacq (French pronunciation: [ʁebenak]; Occitan: Revenac) is a commune in the Pyrénées-Atlantiques department in south-western France.

== See also ==
- Ossau Valley
- Communes of the Pyrénées-Atlantiques department
