= Ossau Valley =

Coordinates: 42°59′N 00°25′W

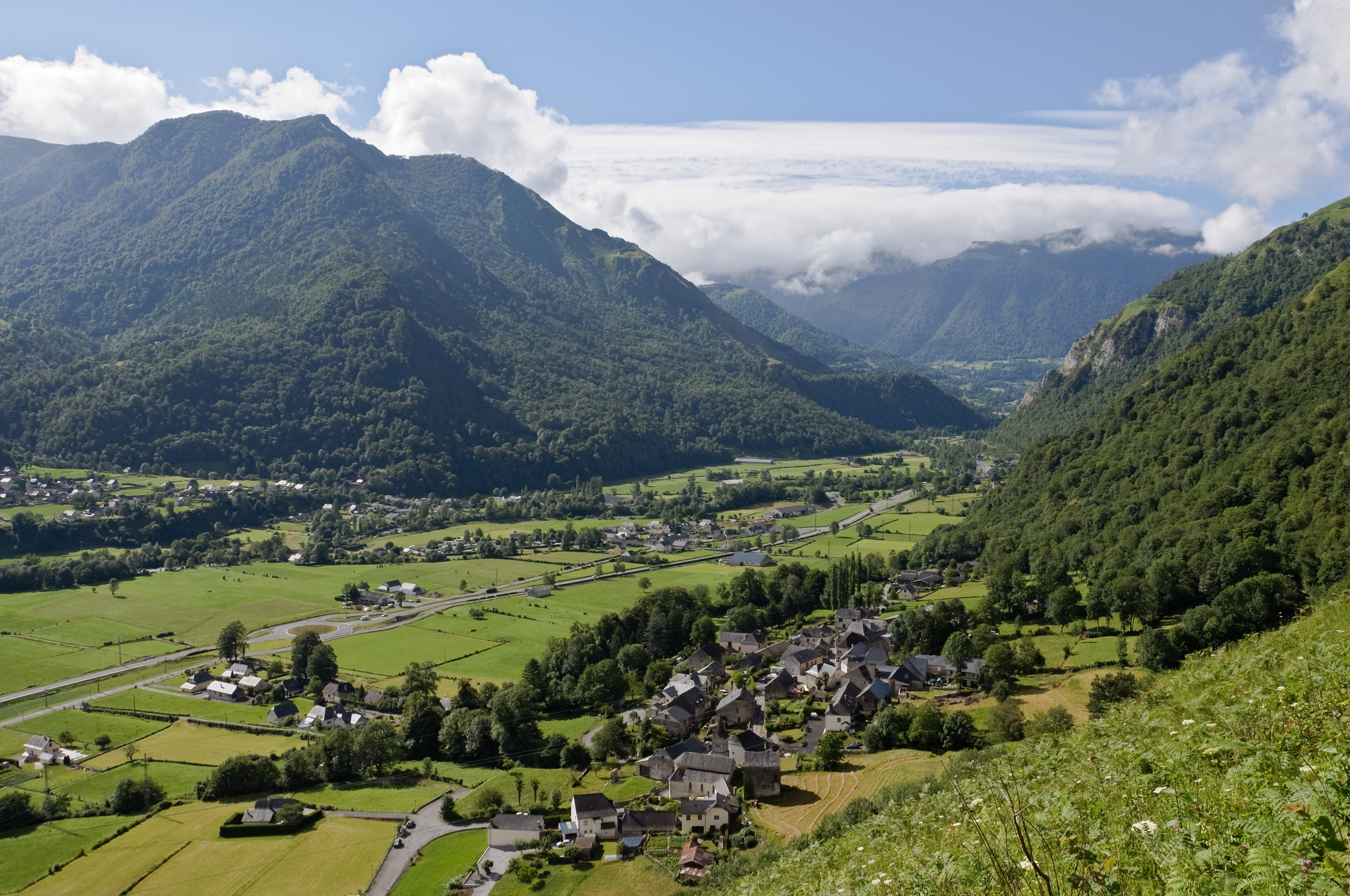
The Ossau Valley seen from above the village of Gère-Bélesten

The Ossau Valley (French: Vallée d'Ossau [vale dɔso]; Gascon: Aussau / la vath d'Aussau) is a valley of the French Pyrénées, in the Pyrénées-Atlantiques département.

== Administration ==
18 communes belong to the Valley: Arudy, Aste-Béon, Béost, Bescat, Bielle, Bilhères, Buzy, Castet, Eaux-Bonnes, Gère-Bélesten, Izeste, Laruns, Louvie-Juzon, Louvie-Soubiron, Lys, Rébénacq, Sainte-Colome and Sévignacq-Meyracq.

== See also ==
- Gave d'Ossau (river)
- Pic du Midi d'Ossau
- Col d'Aubisque
- Gourette
- Ossau-Iraty (cheese)
- Petit train d'Artouste
