= Jean Poueigh =

French composer, musicologist, music critic and folklorist

Jean Marie Octave Géraud Poueigh (24 February 1876 in Toulouse – 14 October 1958 in Olivet) was a French composer, musicologist, music critic, and folklorist. According to Henri Collet, Poueigh was fighting ‘for a national music that can only be such by reviving itself at the source of popular melody… recreating folk-lore, without plagiarising it’.

He also wrote music criticism under the pseudonym Octave Séré. Poueigh is known for suing fellow French composer Erik Satie over an insulting postcard.

== Biography ==
He began playing the piano as a child, then in the autumn of 1895 enrolled at the Faculty of Law and began studying harmony with Jean Hugounenc, a teacher at the Toulouse Conservatoire. After two years, he was able to enter Hugounenc's class and that same year (July 1898) won first second prize for harmony. He then left for Paris and became a free listener at the Conservatoire National: he studied counterpoint and fugue with Georges Caussade and for a few months he attended the composition classes of Charles Lenepveu before entering the class of Gabriel Fauré. From autumn 1898 to the end of 1902 he was also taught by Vincent d'Indy of the Schola Cantorum of Paris.

Jean Poueigh is the author of works of chamber music, vocal or instrumental, a violin sonata, lyrical works like Perkain, premiered at the Bordeaux opera on 16 January 1931 with sets and costumes by Ramiro Arrue), or le Roi de Camargue (performed in Marseille 21 May 1948).

A Jean Poueigh Festival was organised on 21 April 1925, at the Salle Gaveau, with the Colonne orchestra conducted by Henri Morin. A young Benjamin Simionesco saw it as a triumph for the composer who had some of this most important works performed by the orchestra, with the participation of Louise Matha, M. Huberty and the Quatuor vocal Gabriel Paulet — Mmes Marthe Cornélis and Vallin-Mathieu, and MM. Gabriel Paulet, Jean Suscinio (1884–1980).

At the same time, he wrote much as a musical critic in the Ère nouvelle. After the performance of the ballet Parade (1917), he wrote a virulent criticism and Érik Satie sent him some incendiary letters, the most famous being thus written: "Monsieur and dear friend, you are only an arse, worse, an arse without music". This being sent on a postcard without envelope, so likely to have been read by the concierge, Satie fell short of a one-year sentence for public defamation. At the trial Jean Cocteau was arrested and beaten by police for repeatedly yelling "arse" in the courtroom. Satie was given a sentence of eight days in jail. Satie was forced to pay a fine but on appeal his prison sentence was suspended and ultimately vacated.

Poueigh was interested in traditional music, collecting songs from the Basque Country and Occitania and beyond, and all the folklore of these regions on which his works are still authoritative.

== Musical works ==
- Marche triomphale, 1900.
- Forêt d'Avril (Georges Norys), 1899. Paris, Hachette, 1900.
- Air à danser, 1902. Published in the supplement to no. 92 of Musica. Paris, P. Laffitte, May 1910.
- Pointes sèches: 1. Cerfs-Volants, 1905; Parc d'Automne, 1906; 3. Combat de Coqs, 1906. Paris, Démets, 1906. It was premiered by Ricardo Viñes at the Société Nationale on 11 January 1908 (Paris : E. Demets, 1907). There is also a version for orchestra.
- Sonata in G for piano and violin premiered at the Société Nationale de Musique on 20 January 1906, by Georges Enesco and Louis Aubert (Paris : E. Demets, 1906);
- Suite Fünn, orchestral suite from a ballet based on the tales of Georges d'Esparbès, performed on 26 April 1906 at the Société Nationale concert and again on 5 January 1908 at the Concerts-Lamoureux : 1. Introduction. Les Lavandières; 2. Les Fleurs du Sommeil; 3. Les Grives, 1901. Paris, Mathot, 1909. The ballet Fünn, a mimed and danced tale in one act was never performed.
- Les Lointains (1902-1903), poème dramatique (Pierre Hortala), for solo voices, choirs and orchestra. Only 'Les Conquérants du rêve' (from the third part of the poem), was performed, first at the Concerts Lamoureux, on 20 February 1910 (salle Gaveau, dir. Camille Chevillard), with Delmas), then in Toulouse by the Orchestre de la Société des concerts du Conservatoire, on 11 February 1911. Only that part of the work has been published: Paris, Mathot, 1909. There is a reduction for voice and piano of 'Les Conquérants du rêve' (Paris : A.-Z. Mathot, 1909).
- Le Meneur de Louves (1921), opera (Libretto by Pierre Hortala based on Rachilde's Le Meneur de Louves (1905).
- Frivolant (1922), ballet on a libretto by the composer and Pierre Hortala, 1922. N. Guerra, Choreographer. Théâtre national de l'Opéra-Palais Garnier, 1 May 1922). Also exists as a handwritten piano score (Gallica: [ark:/12148/cb440014638]).
- Rhapsodie des Pyrénées (1925)
- Pierrette et Mathurin, incidental music for the play by Fernand Nozière and André Lénéka (based on a short story by Alfred de Vigny), 1925 or 1926, Odéon-Théâtre de l'Europe.
- Le Chevalier de Miramont, a pastoral comedy in three acts and verse by Emile Rondié and Simin Palay based on the Béarn poet Cyprien Despourrins: 8 August 1926, Théâtre de la nature in Cauterets. Music, chorus and dances ‘reconstituted’ by Poueigh.
- Suite montagnarde (1926)
- Perkain (1932) Lyrical legend (opera) in 3 acts, libretto by Pierre-Barthélemy Gheusi based on Pierre Harispe's work. The action takes place in the Basque Country during the French Revolution. Premiere at the Grand Théâtre de Bordeaux, 16 janvier 1931. Paris premiere at the Paris Opera, 25 January 1934. Three dances from the Pyrenees (Montagnarde de la bergère Nanette; Danse des épées; Saut basque) for orchestra as well as Two symphonic preludes (Nocturne basque; La Partie de pelote) were published separately (Paris : Choudens, éditeur, 1932).
- Music for the film The Gardens of Murcia based on Josep Feliu i Codina play Maria del Carmen (also set to music by Enrique Granados, as María del Carmen), lyrics by Marcel Gras. Several songs were published separately : 'Berceuse de la Huerta' and 'Tes vingt ans' (Paris : Choudens, 1936), and 'Parranda murcienne' (Paris : Choudens, 1937). At least two of them were also recorded (Pathé PA 1082, November 1936)
- Andorra ou les Hommes d'airain (film 1942)
- Le Roi de Camargue (1948), musical comedy on a libretto by Jean Suberville (1887-1953) based on the then-famous novel by Jean Aicard. "Jean Poueigh's music has captivating tones". A love rivalry at the time of the pilgrimage to Saintes-Maries-de-la-Mer.
- Bois-Brûlé (1956) opera
- Songs for voice and piano on poems by Pierre Hortala: 'Semailles', 1903 (Paris, E. Démets, 1906); "Deux Nocturnes" for voice and orchestra includes 'Le Soir rôde', 1910 (Orchestrated : Paris, A. Z. Mathot, 1910) and 'Dentellière de rêve', 1906 (Paris : A. Z. Mathot, 1909 : poem sung by Mme Fournier de Nocé with orchestral accompaniment on 20 April 1907, at the Société Nationale). There is also 'La Ronde du Blé-d'Amour', a song for four voices or mixed choir, with orchestral (or piano) accompaniment (1902-1911).
- Poueigh collected and notated popular songs from Languedoc with French adaptation and piano accompaniment (Paris, Rouart, 1907), and from Languedoc and Gascony (Les Chansons de France, journal, 1907 and 1908). Other traditional songs ‘with harmonization and ritornello’ were published in 1906-1907 by Rouart (Paris). Then came Chansons Populaires des Pyrénées Françaises (Paris: Champion, 1926). A collection of Chansons populaires des pays d'Oc collected and harmonised for 4-part mixed and a capella choir with French adaptation of the dialect texts was published in 1955, with a preface by composer César Geoffray (Paris: les Presses d'Ile-de-France).

== Literary works ==
- 1921: Musiciens français d'aujourd'hui (under the pseudonym Octave Séré), Paris, Mercure de France
- 1926: Chansons populaires des Pyrénées françaises, traditions, mœurs, usages, Paris
- 1951: Chants de Béarn et de Gascogne, in collaboration with Simin Palay
- 1952: Le folklore des pays d’oc : la tradition occitane, Paris, Payot
- 1954: De la musique chez les Basques : leurs chants et leurs danses populaires, VIIIe Congrès d'études basques, Bayonne, Ustaritz
