= Béarnese dialect =

Dialect of Gascon

Bearnese
- Bearnés
- Native to: France
- Region: Béarn
- Native speakers: (ca. 55,000 cited 2001)
- Language family: Indo-European: Italic; Latino-Faliscan; Romance; Italo-Western; Western; Gallo-Romance; Occitano-Romance; Occitan; Gascon; Bearnese

Official status
- Recognised minority language in: France: Nouvelle-Aquitaine

Language codes
- ISO 639-3: –
- Glottolog: bear1240
- IETF: oc-gascon-u-sd-fr64
- Bearnese area.

Béarnese (endonym bearnés or biarnés; French: béarnais [beaʁnɛ]) is the variety of Gascon spoken in Béarn.

The usage of a specific name for Béarnese lies in the history of Béarn, a viscounty that became a sovereign principality under Gaston Fébus. From the middle of the 13th century until the French Revolution, Béarnese was the institutional language of this territory. The standardised orthography defined by the administrative and judicial acts was adopted outside the limits of Béarn, not only in a part of Gascony, but also in some Basque territories.

The French language exerted an increasing influence on Béarn from the middle of the 16th century, due to its annexation as a French province in 1620. The use of Béarnese as an institutional language ended with the Revolution, its use being limited to popular culture. Cyprien Despourrins, Xavier Navarrot and Alexis Peyret, for example, used Béarnese in their works. From the second half of the 19th century to the first half of the 20th century, the Béarnese language was standardized, particularly by Vastin Lespy, Simin Palay and Jean Bouzet.

Béarnese remained the majority language among the Bearnais people in the 18th century. It was not until the second half of the 19th century that its use declined in favor of French. The French school entered into direct conflict with the use of regional languages in the last third of the nineteenth century and until the first half of the twentieth century, causing a clear decline in the transmission of Béarnais within the families from the 1950s. As a reaction, the first calandreta school was created in Pau in 1980, allowing for the revival of its teaching. The number of speakers of Béarnais is difficult to estimate; a 2008 survey suggests that 8 to 15% of the population speaks Béarnese, depending on the definition chosen.

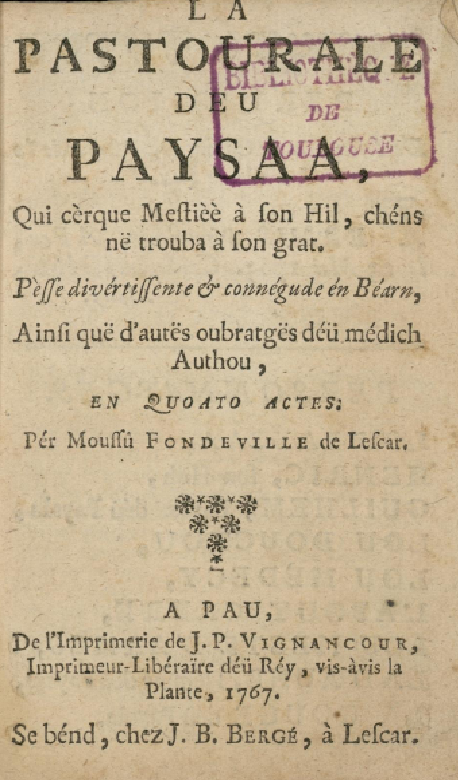
18th century edition of Fondeville's play La pastourale deu paysaa

== Definition ==
=== Name ===
The word Béarnese comes from the endonym bearnés or biarnés. The term derives directly from the people of Venarni, or Benearni, who gave their name to Béarn. The city of the Venarni, Beneharnum, was included in Novempopulania at the beginning of the 5th century. The origin of the name of the Béarnese has several hypotheses, one of which evokes a relationship with the Basque word behera which means "below". Although used from the middle of the 13th century in the administration of the principality, the use of Béarnese did not benefit from a "mystique" of the language, as in the kingdom of France. The linguistic conscience is not affirmed, the language never being named in the writings. The term "Béarnese" appears for the first time in the French language, but it is not used in the French language. The term Béarnese appears for the first time in the writings in a document of March 1, 1533, the States of Béarn refuse to examine texts written in French, and require their translation into Béarnes. In 1556, Jeanne d'Albret also gave reason to the States which claimed the exclusive use of bearnes for any pleading and writing of justice. Arnaud de Salette is considered to be the first writer to claim a writing in rima bernesa in his translation of the Genevan Psalter, composed between 1568 and 1571 and published in 1583 in Orthez.

The use of the name "Béarnese" continued in the following centuries, as with Jean-Henri Fondeville in his eglogues of the end of the seventeenth century, who expresses: "En frances, en biarnes, chens nat mout de latii." In the late nineteenth century, the use of the word "Béarnese" to designate the language of Béarn was gradually replaced by the word patois, with its pejorative aspect. This movement is common to the whole of France. The use of the term patois declined from the 1980s onwards, with the revival of regional languages. At the same time, the use of the name "Occitan" increased with the rise of Occitanism. During the sociolinguistic survey commissioned by the Conseil départemental des Pyrénées-Atlantiques in 2018, the people of Béarn were asked about the name they gave to their regional language. The term "Béarnese" obtained between 62 per cent and 70 per cent of the votes depending on the intercommunity concerned, compared to 19% to 31% for the term "patois", 8 to 14 per cent for "Occitan" and a maximum of 3 per cent for "Gascon".

The expression "Béarnese language" was used as early as Arnaud de Salette in the 16th century, "la lengoa bernesa", and this use is not based on a scientific observation, but on an identity approach, in a context of rising Béarn nationalism. The expression langue béarnaise continues to be regularly used thereafter, a use that is now historical, but still not scientific.

=== Bearnese whistled language ===
In the village of Aas, Pyrénées-Atlantiques, shepherds maintained a whistled language until the 20th century. According to Graham Robb, very few outsiders knew of the language until a 1959 TV program mentioned it. Whistles were up to 100 decibels, and were used for communication by shepherds in the mountains and by women working in the fields. During the Nazi occupation of World War II, the language was used to ferry refugees across the France–Spain border.

Today the language can be learnt at the University of Pau and the Adour region.

== Geography ==
=== Linguistic area ===
The origin of the notion of the Béarnese language is based solely on political considerations. In the middle of the 16th century, Béarn vigorously defended its sovereignty, in an undeniable nationalism. The language became an additional element of this Béarnese particularism. Thus, the linguistic area of Béarnese and the political borders of Béarn are combined. The "historical Bearn" is progressively formed in the 11th century and 12th century with the addition of various territories to the "primitive Bearn". Béarn kept its borders intact until the French Revolution. The communes of Esquiule and Lichos form two particular cases, Esquiule being a commune of Basque culture located in Béarn and Lichos a commune of Béarn culture in Soule. The Souletine communes of Montory and Osserain-Rivareyte are also considered to be Béarnese-speaking. At the time of the Revolution, about twenty Gascon communes were integrated into the newly created department of the Basses-Pyrénées. All of these communes are now linked to Béarn cantons and inter-municipalities, and are therefore integrated into the borders of "modern Béarn", so the use of the term Béarnais can be applied to these new areas. The practice of Béarnese in an institutional framework allows the formation of a Béarnese orthography, which is used outside of Béarn from the thirteenth to the fifteenth century, in Gascon territories (Bigorre and sometimes Comminges) and Basque territories (Soule, Lower-Navarre and Gipuzcoa).

== Sociolinguistics ==
Béarnese is currently the most prominent variety of Gascon. It is widely used in the normativization attempts to reach a standard Gascon and is the most likely dialect to succeed, due to the stronger cultural identity and output of this area. A 1982 survey of the inhabitants of Béarn indicated that 51% of the population can speak Béarnese, 70% understood it, and 85% were in favor of preserving the language. However, use of the language has declined over recent years as Béarnese is rarely transmitted to younger generations within the family. There is a revival of focus on the language which has improved the situation, though, leading children to be taught the language in school (comparable to the way Irish students are taught a standardized form of Irish). Currently, the majority of the cultural associations consider Gascon (including Béarnese) an Occitan dialect. However, other authorities consider them to be distinct languages, including Jean Lafitte, publisher of Ligam-DiGam, a linguistic and lexicography review of Gascon.

A detailed sociolinguistic study presenting the current status of the language (practice and different locutors' perceptions) has been made in 2004 by B. Moreux (see Sources): the majority of native speakers have learned it orally, and tend to be older. On the other hand, the proponents for its maintenance and revival are classified into three groups: Béarnists, Gasconists and Occitanists, terms which summarize the regional focus they give respectively to their language(s) of interest: Béarn, Gascony or Occitania.

=== Status and recognition ===
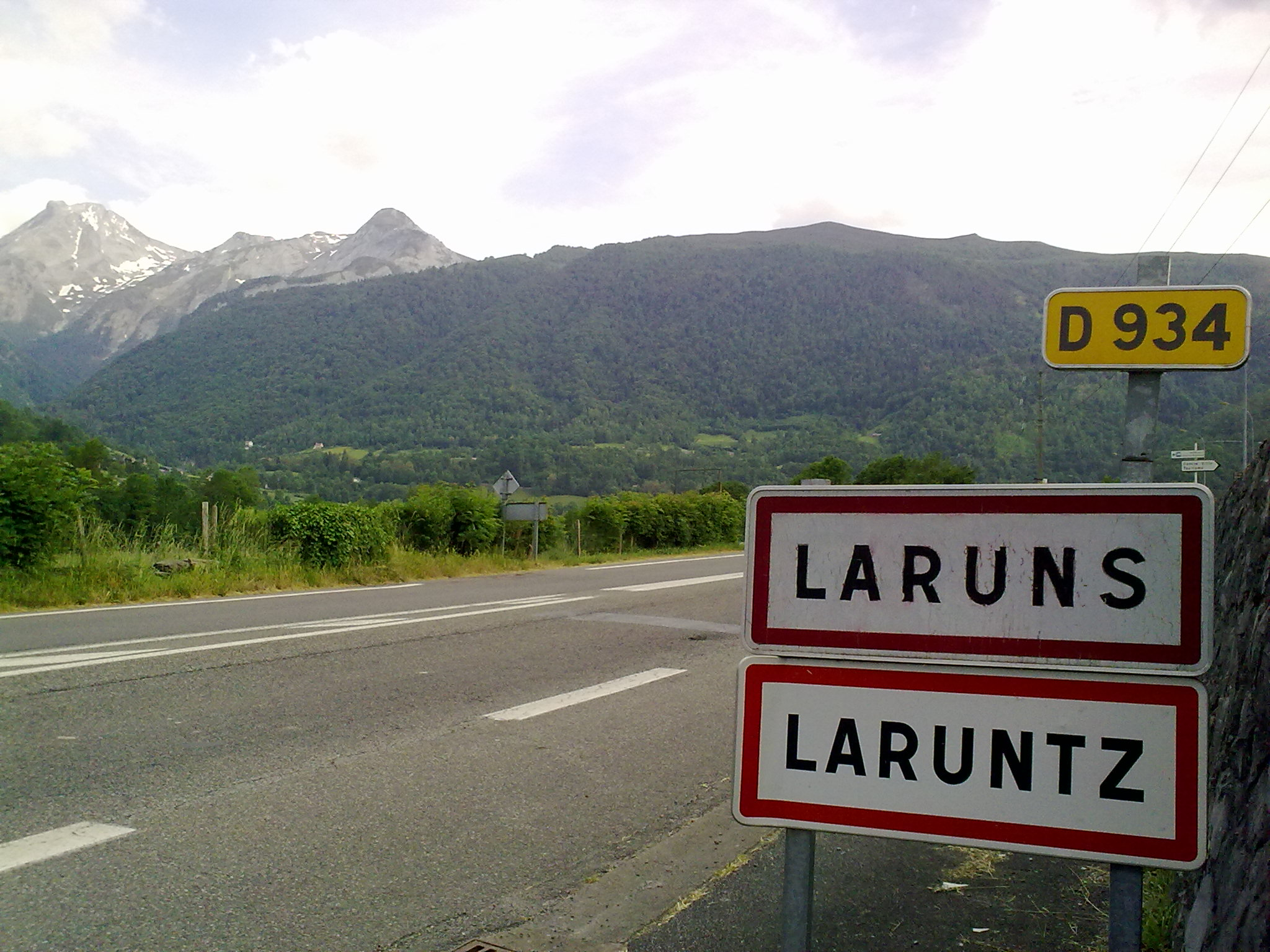
Bilingual French/Béarnais sign at the entrance of Laruns.

Used from the middle of the 13th century to replace Latin in this former Basque-speaking region, Béarnese remained the institutional language of the sovereign principality of Bearn from 1347 to 1620. The language was used in the administrative and judicial acts of the country. In the middle of the 16th century, French also began to be used in certain acts of the Béarnaise administration. With the annexation of Béarn by the Kingdom of France in 1620, Béarnese continued to be used in the administration of the new French province, concurrently with French. Since the French Revolution, Béarnese has no official recognition. As stated in Article 2 of the Constitution of the Fifth French Republic: "The language of the Republic is French", with no other place for regional or minority languages. Since the modification of the Constitution in 2008, Béarnese, as well as other regional languages, is recognized as belonging to the heritage of France. Article 75-1 states that "regional languages belong to the heritage of France". At the international level, Bearnais does not have an ISO 639 code, it is included in the "oc" code. The Linguistic Observatory assigns the code 51-AAA-fb to Bearnais in its Linguasphere register.

The departmental council of the Pyrénées-Atlantiques has set up actions to support what it calls "Béarnese/Gascon/Occitan", through teaching and the creation of educational and cultural content. Iniciativa is the name of the departmental plan that sets the guidelines of the language policy in favor of "Bearnese/Gascon/Occitan". The department's website is partly accessible in langue d'oc, as well as in English, Spanish and Basque. Several Béarn communes have installed bilingual signs at the entrance to their commune, such as Bordes, Etsaut, Artix, Lacq or Billère.

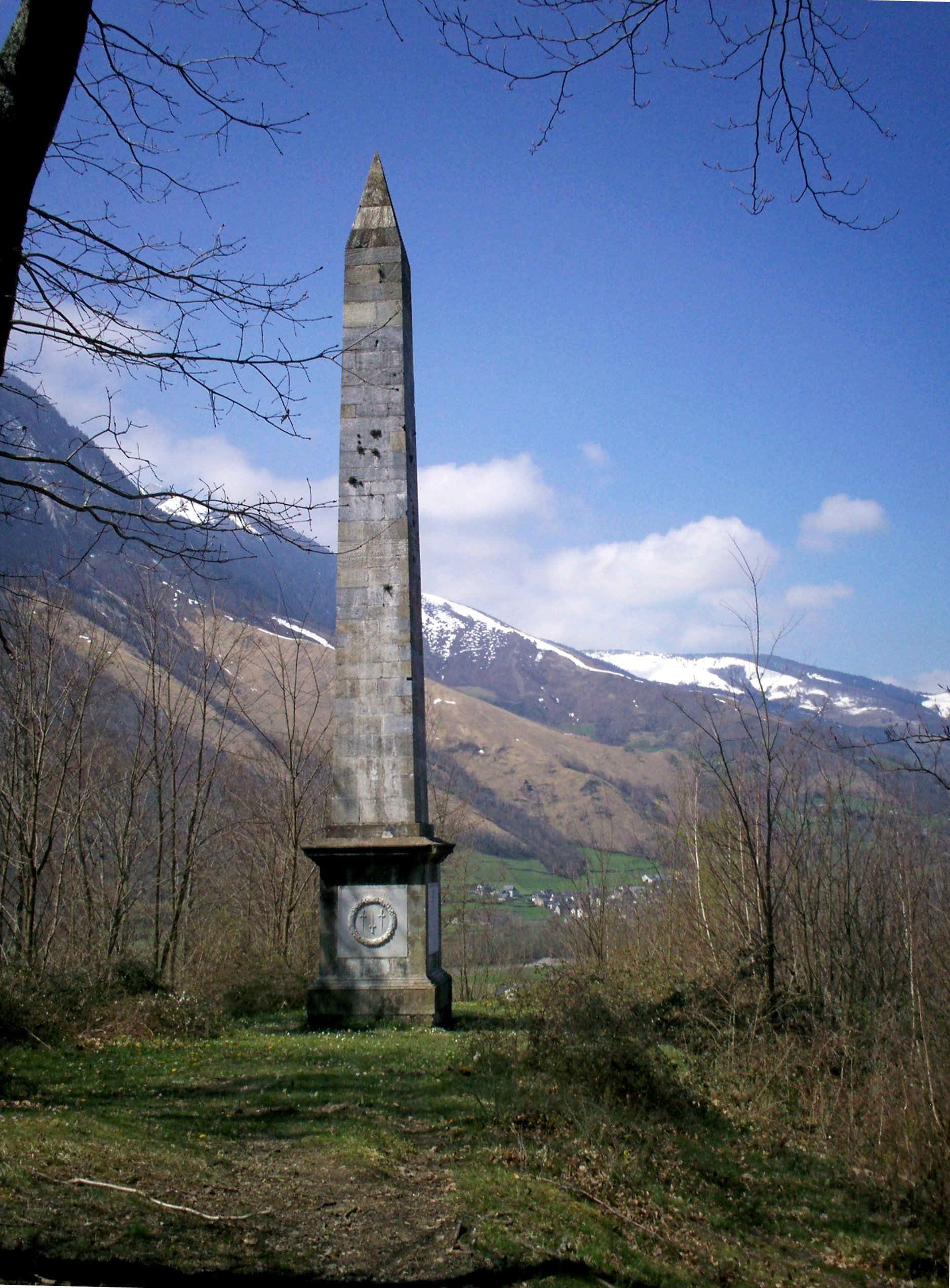
Cyprien Despourrins's obelisk

== Literature ==
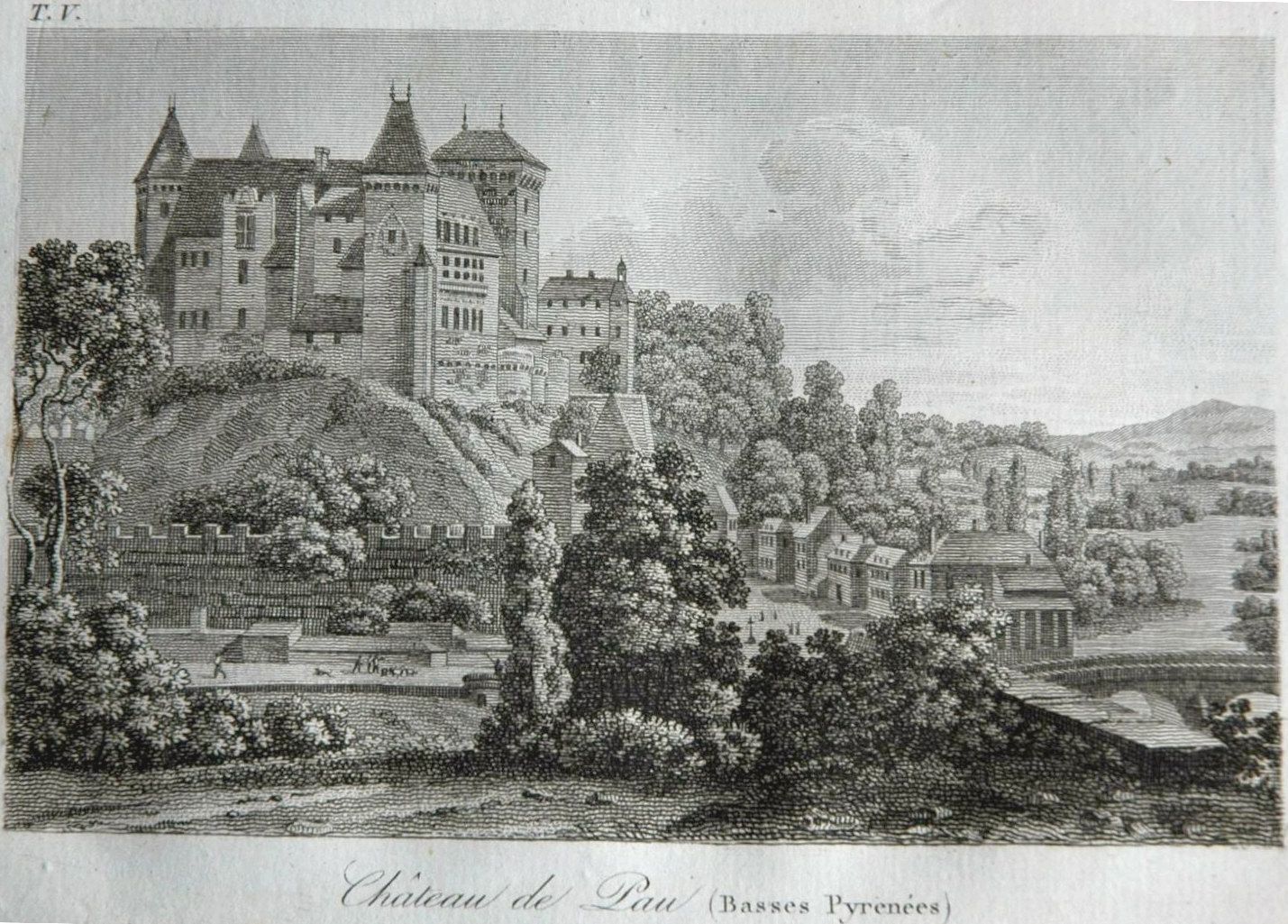
Pau Castle, where the Occitan court of the Kingdom of Navarra reigned

Concerning literature and poems, the first important book was a Béarnese translation of the Psalms of David by Arnaud de Salette, at the end of the 16th century, contemporary with the Gascon (Armagnac dialect) translation of these Psalms by Pey de Garros. Both translations were ordered by Jeanne d'Albret, queen of Navarre and mother of Henry IV of France, to be used at Protestant churches. Henri IV was first Enric III de Navarra, the king of this independent Calvinist and Occitan-speaking state. The Béarnese dialect was his native language that he also used in letters to his subjects.

During the 17th century, the Béarnese writer Jean-Henri Fondeville (among others) composed plays such as La Pastourale deu Paysaa and also his anti-Calvinist Eglògas. The 18th-century Béarnese poet Cyprien Despourrins wrote poems that became folk songs. From the 19th century we can mention poet Xavier Navarrot and also Alexis Peyret, who emigrated to Argentina for political reasons where he edited his Béarnese poetry.

After the creation of the Felibrige, the Escole Gastoû Fèbus (which would become Escòla Gaston Fèbus) was created as the Béarnese part of Frédéric Mistral's and Joseph Roumanille's academy. Simin Palay, one of its most prominent members, published a dictionary.

Noticeable representatives of modern béarnese literature include poets Roger Lapassade, and novelists Eric Gonzalès, Serge Javaloyès, and Albert Peyroutet.

== See also ==
- Souletin dialect, a neighboring Basque dialect influenced by Béarnese phonology and vocabulary
