= Jean-Henri Fondeville =

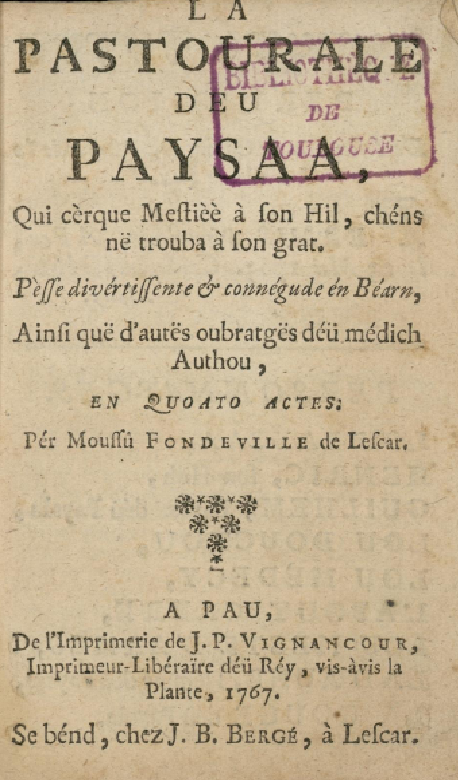
1667 edition of la Pastorala deu Paisan

Jean-Henri Fondeville (Occitan: Joan Enric de Fondevila, IPA: [ʒwan enˈrik ðe fundeˈvilo̞]; c. 1638 – 22 October 1705) was a Béarnese Occitan writer.

Fondeville is author of the la Pastourale deu Paysaa and also of the vehemently anti-Calvinist pastoral poem Eglògas.

== Biography ==
Fondeville was born after the integration of Béarn into the Kingdom of France in 1621.

Before this event, Béarn had been part of the Kingdom of Navarre. When Queen Jeanne d'Albret adopted Calvinism, the kingdom became Protestant, keeping Béarnese Occitan as its administrative language, and when Jeanne d'Albret's son, Henry III of Navarre, became Henry IV of France and Navarre, he maintained the kingdom's independence; however, his son, Louis XIII of France, decided to merge the kingdom with France, and to re-establish Catholicism.

During this process, Fondeville's father, a Protestant priest, was offered a lifetime annuity in order to choose Catholicism. Fondeville's godfather was Jean-Henri de Salette, bishop of Lescar, (in which city he Fondeville is buried under the Latin inscription patronus et poeta facundus).

In addition to being a writer, Fondeville also had an illustrious career as a lawyer at the Parliament of Navarre and Béarn, which had its seat in Pau.

== Bibliography ==
- Fondeville, Jean-Henri. La Pastourale deu paysaa, qui cèrque mestièè à son hil, chéns nè trouba à son grat. Pèsse divértissente et connégude én Béarn, ainsi què d'autès oubratgès déü médich authou, en quoato actes. Pau : Vignancour, 1767.
- Fondeville, Jean-Henri. La pastourale deu paysaa qui cerque mestièe a soun hilh, chens ne trouba a soun grat, en quoate actes. Pau : Ribaut, 1885.

== Online editions ==
- Sus gallica.bnf.fr
  - Edicion de 1885
  - Edicion de 1767
