= Accous =

- Commune
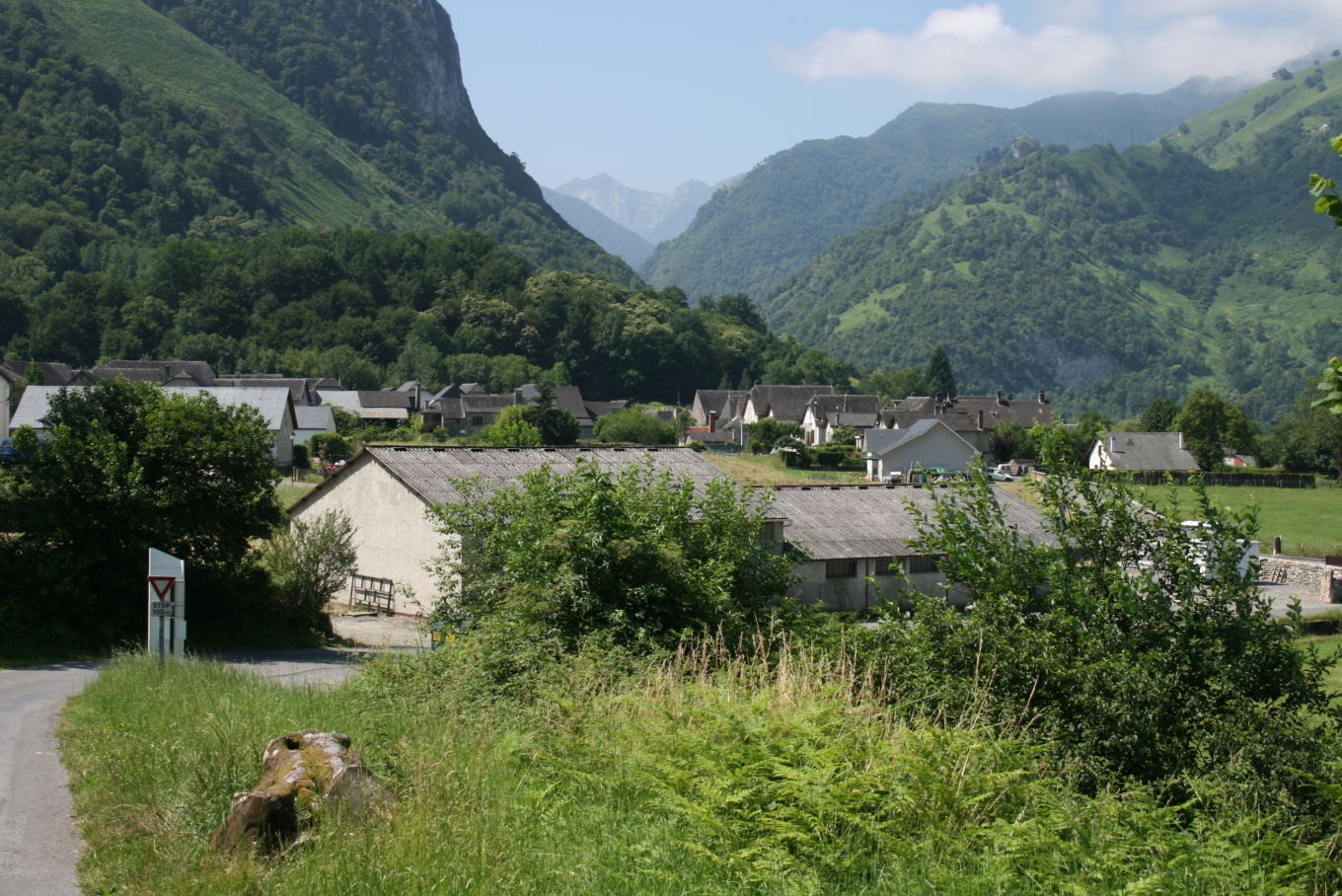
- A general view of Accous

- Coat of arms
- Location of Accous
- Location within France Location within Nouvelle-Aquitaine
- Coordinates: 42°58′30″N 0°35′55″W
- Country: France
- Region: Nouvelle-Aquitaine
- Department: Pyrénées-Atlantiques
- Arrondissement: Oloron-Sainte-Marie
- Canton: Oloron-Sainte-Marie-1
- Intercommunality: Haut Béarn

Government
  - Mayor (2020–2026): Dany Barraud
- Area^{1}: 60.68 km^{2} (23.43 sq mi)
- Highest elevation: 2,458 m (8,064 ft)
- Lowest elevation: 420 m (1,380 ft)
- Population (2023): 471
  - Density: 7.76/km^{2} (20.1/sq mi)
- Time zone: UTC+01:00 (CET)
  - Summer (DST): UTC+02:00 (CEST)
- INSEE/Postal code: 64006 /64490
- ^{1} French Land Register data, which excludes lakes, ponds, glaciers > 1 km^{2} (0.386 sq mi or 247 acres) and river estuaries.

Accous (French pronunciation: [akus]; Occitan: Acós) is a commune in the Pyrénées-Atlantiques department in the Nouvelle-Aquitaine region in southwestern France.

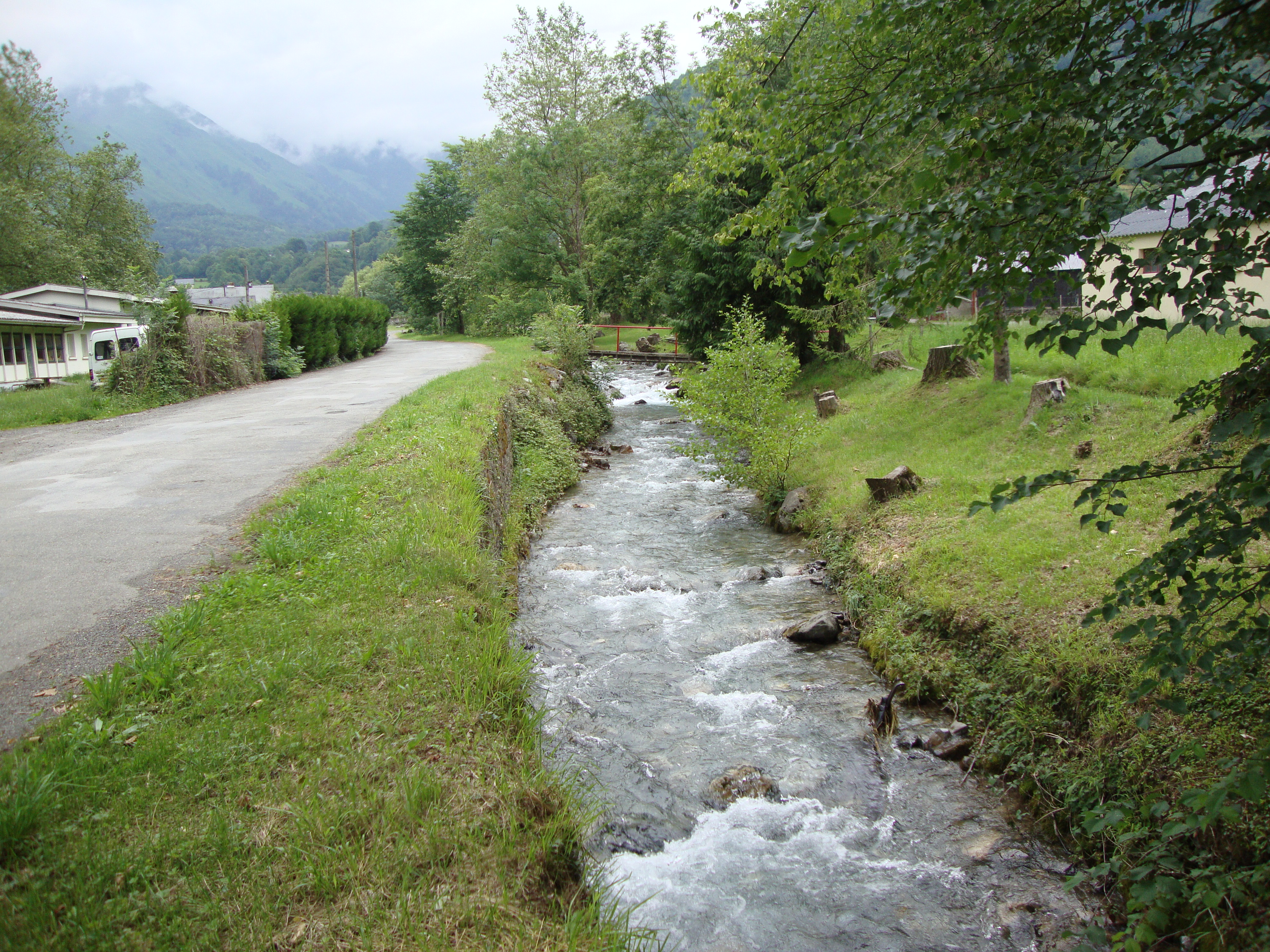
La Berthe stream at Accous.

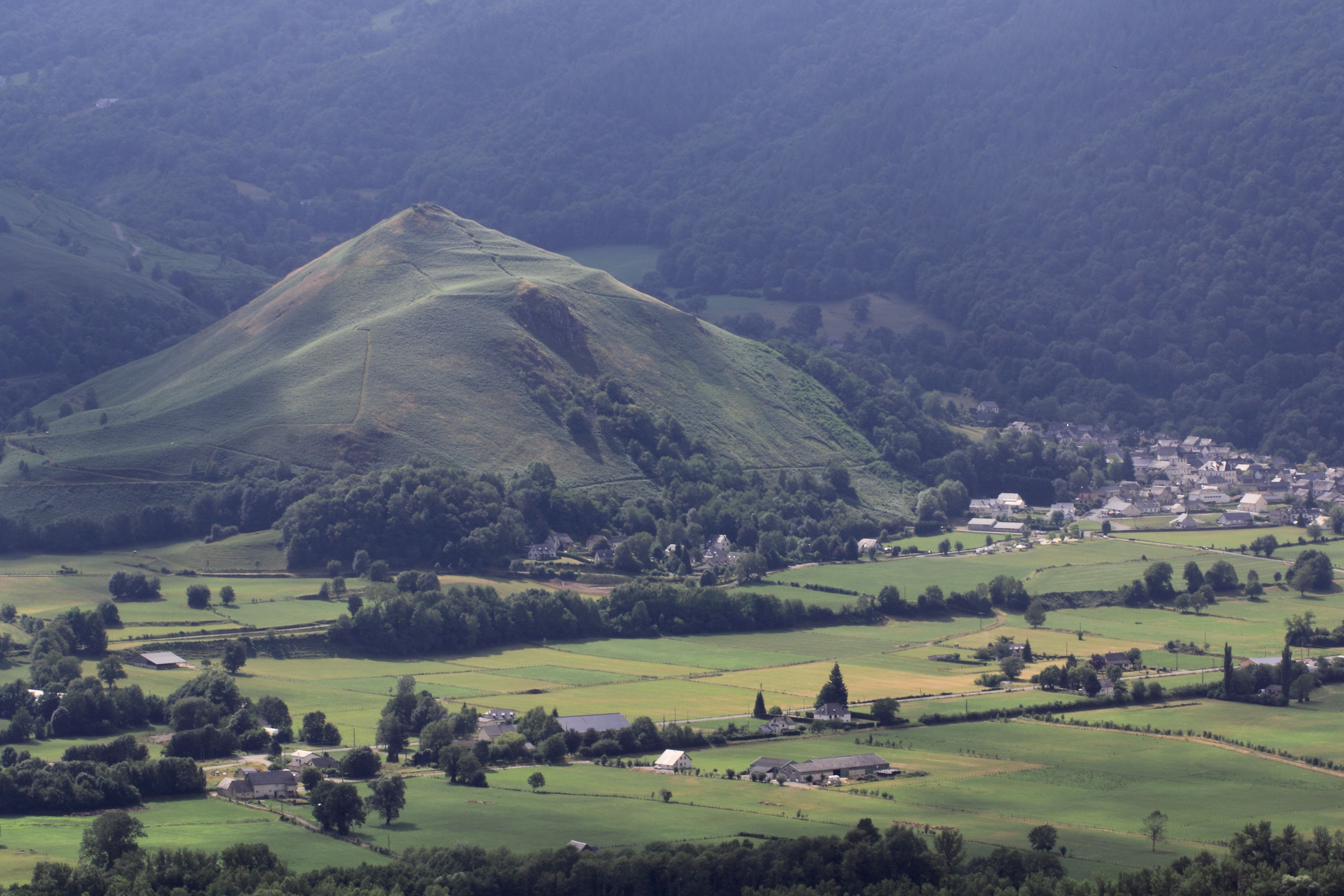
The Poey dominating Accous.

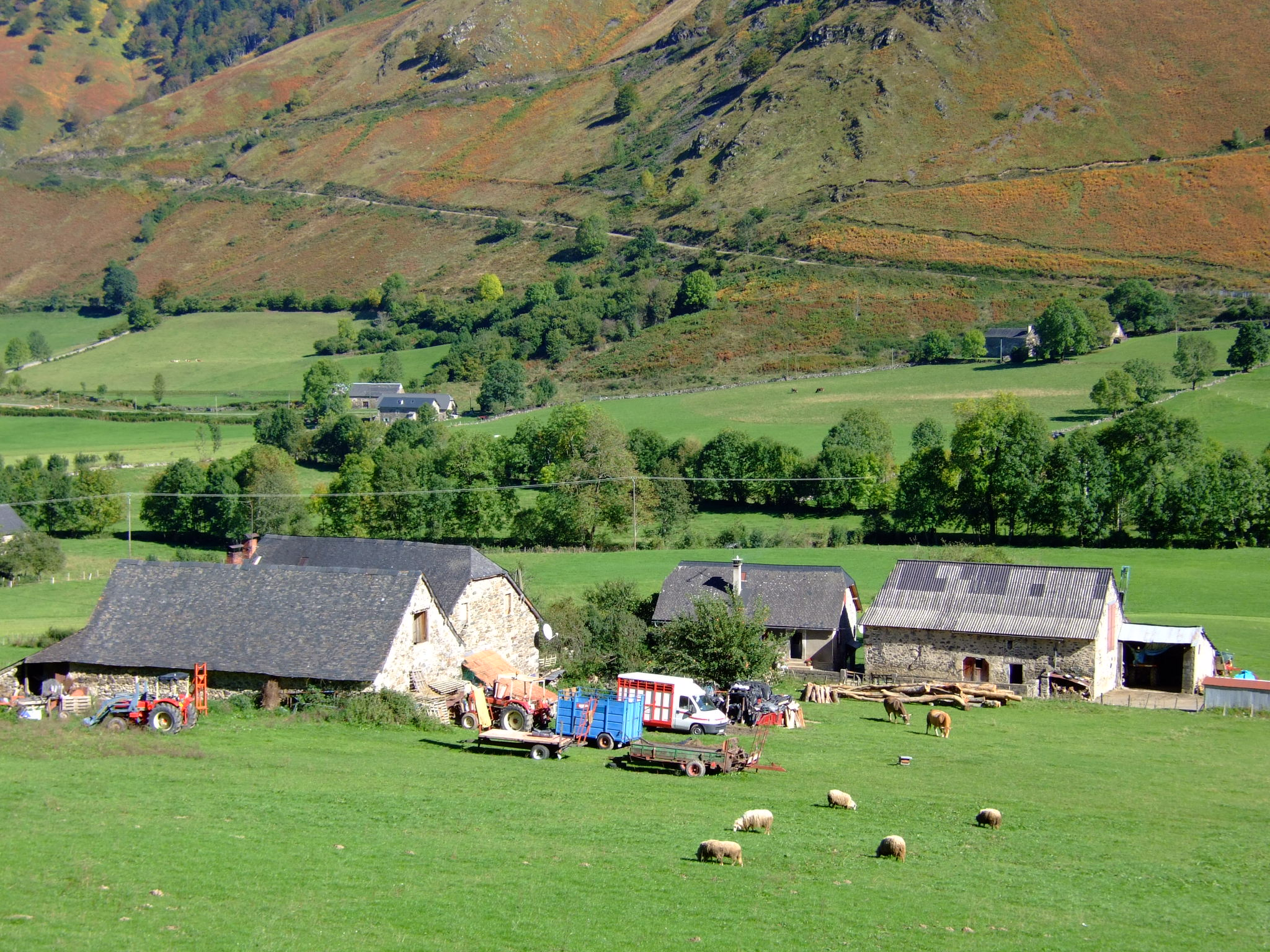
The plateau of Lhers.

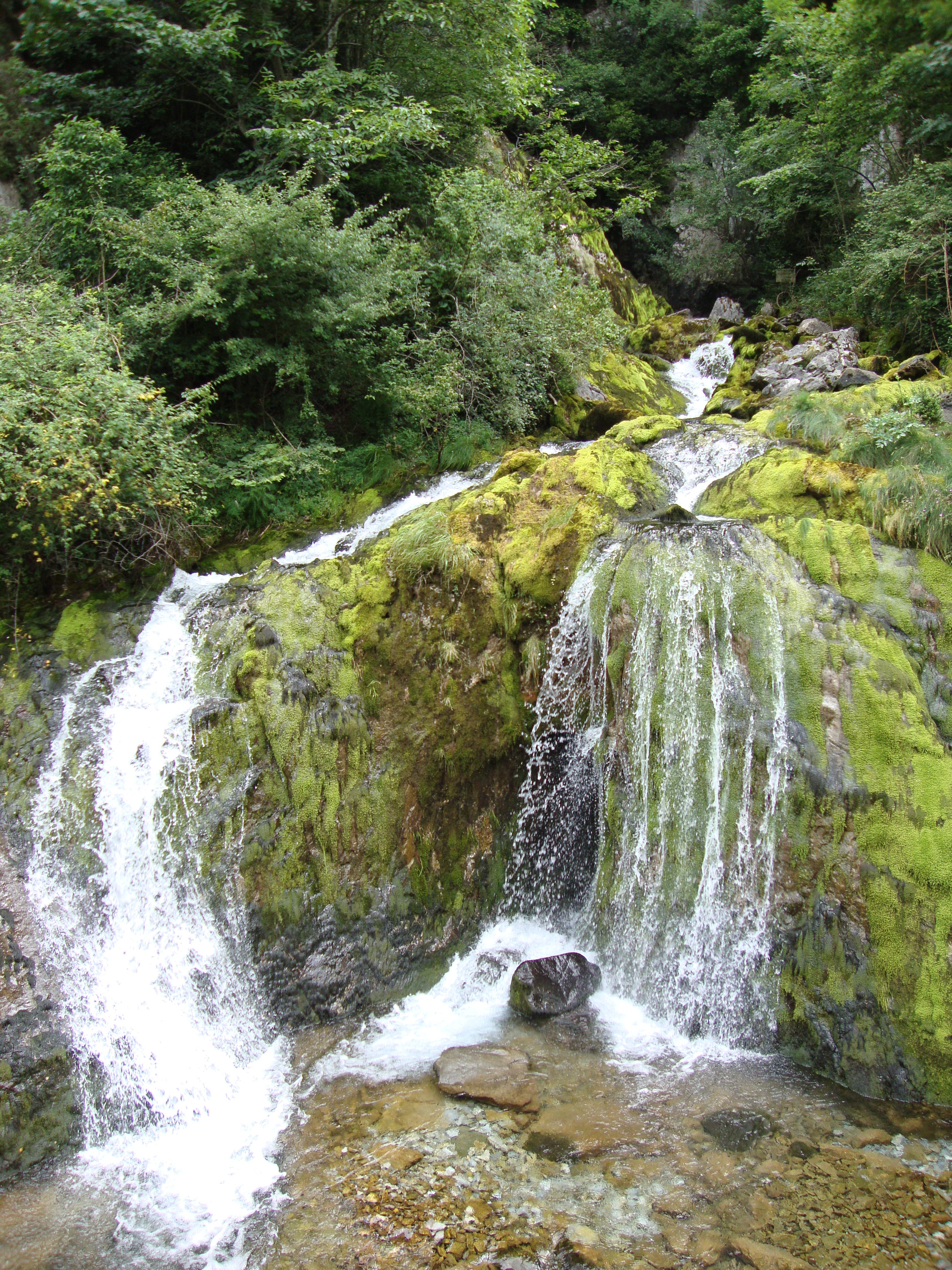
Waterfall down to the Bois d'Arapoup from the Esquir bridge.

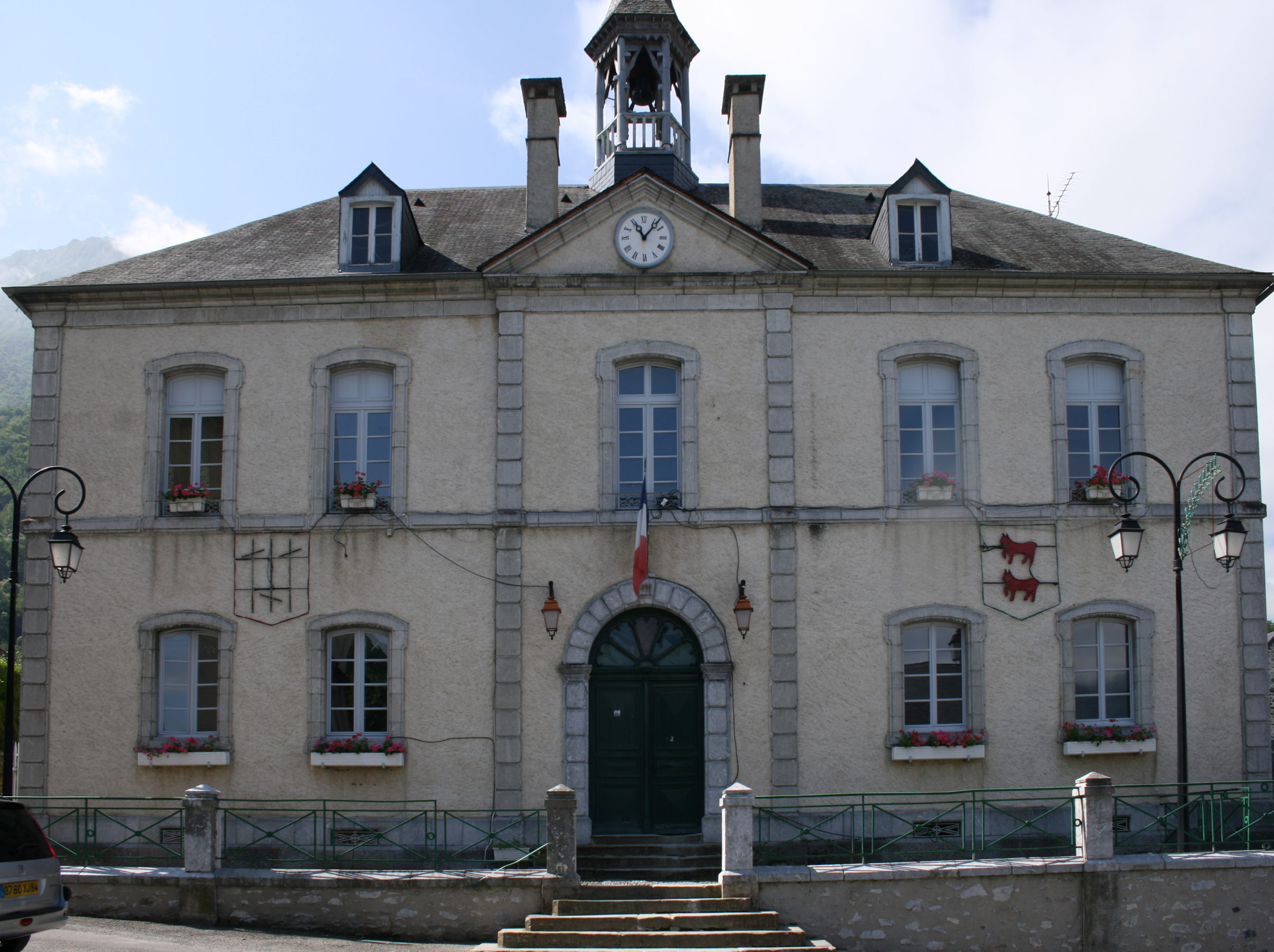
The Town Hall.

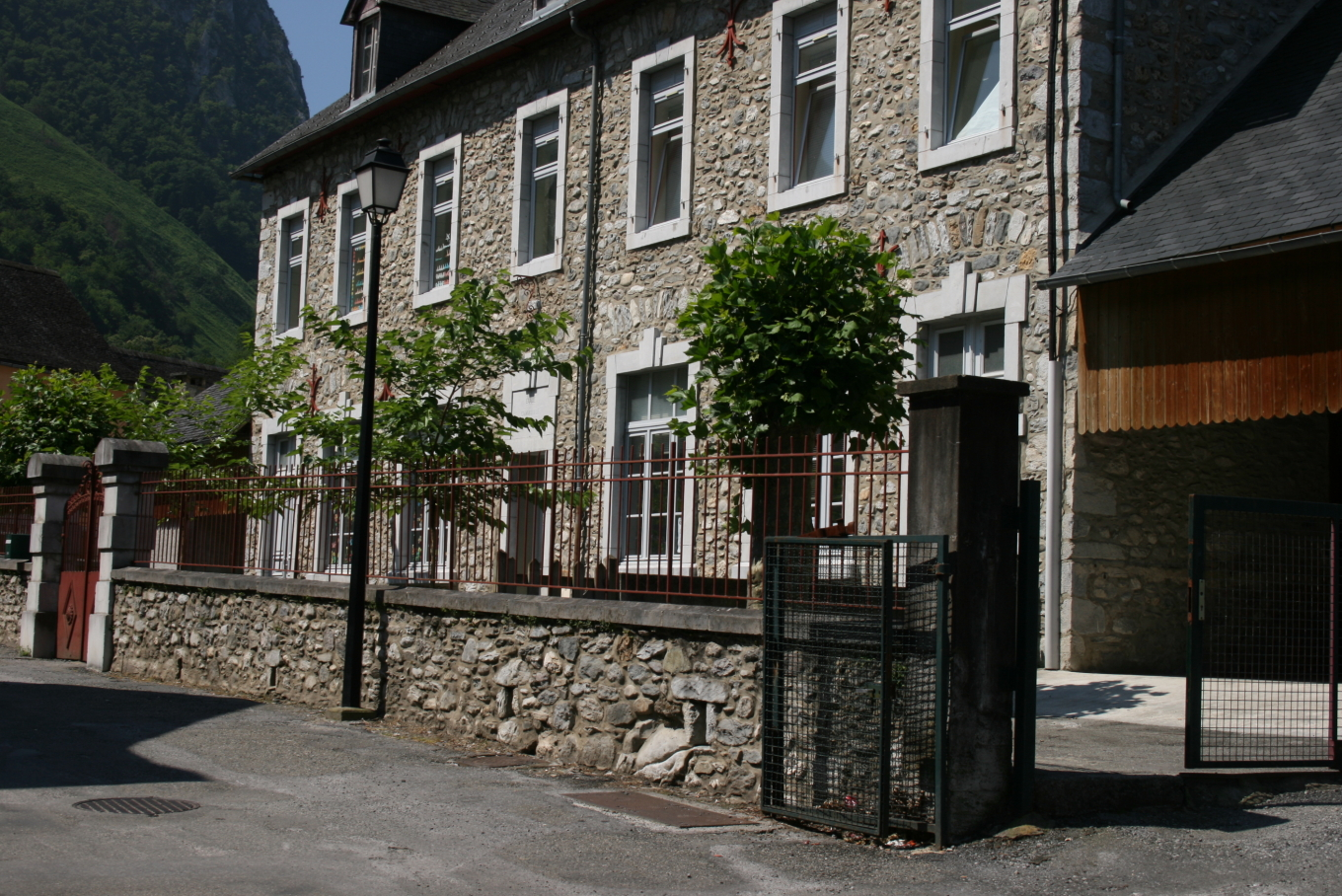
The School.

== Geography ==
=== Location ===
Accous is located some 30 km south of Oloron-Sainte-Marie in the Aspe Valley, one of the three valleys of the High-Béarn, the other valleys being the Ossau Valley in the east and Barétous Valley in the west. From the Spanish border on its southern edge, it stretches along Le Labadie river to the point where it joins the Gave d'Aspe. From this river junction, the Gave d'Aspe forms the western border of the rest of the commune which extends a further 10 kilometres to the east with the Lac du Montagnon at the northeastern edge.

=== Access ===
The commune is accessed from the north by the E7 motorway. This highway follows the western border of the commune along the Gave d'Aspe then crosses the narrow neck of the commune before continuing to the Spanish border near Candanchu. To access Accous village it is necessary to follow one of a number of country roads - the Daban Athas road probably being the most direct. Apart from country roads within the commune there is no other road access.

=== Hydrography ===
The commune is traversed by some tributaries of the Gave d'Oloron, the Besse stream and the Gave d'Aspe, as well as tributaries of the latter such as the Gave Lescun (itself joined in the commune by the Labadie creek) and the Berthe (Accous is fed by the torrent of Araille).

The Cotcharas stream and its tributary, the Congaets stream also flow in the territory of Accous, as tributaries of the Gave d'Aydius, the Gave de Bouren and the Sahun stream.

=== Relief ===
Accous is dominated by the Poey, a conical hill covered with ferns, culminating at 652 m. The Poey is of volcanic origin and is made of ophites. These green and harsh volcanic rocks from the Triassic belong to dolerites. They have resisted the erosion of glaciers and torrential rivers. This is the reason why the Poey of Accous markedly emerges from the plain.

=== Localities and hamlets ===
- Borde Apiou
- Appatie
- Arapoup (Bois d')
- Aulet north
- Aumet
- Balet
- Castet de Bergout
- Borde Boudrux
- Bouhaben
- Cabane de Cambou
- Campagnet
- Camy
- Camy Lapassatet
- Candarrameigt
- Casala
- Borde de Casteigbou
- Borde Castillou
- Chapelet
- Borde de Couyepetrou
- Cabanes de la Cuarde
- Colonne Despourins
- Embielle
- l’Estanguet
- Fontaine de l’Espugna
- Gouaillard
- Guiraute
- Jouers
- Borde Laborde
- Labourdette
- Lagahe
- Lalheve
- Cabane du Lapassa
- Borde Laplacette
- Borde Larraux
- Borde Larré
- Lauda
- Lhers
- Lourtica (Col de)
- Borde Lousteau
- Borde Maria
- Mariet
- Moulia Jean-Baptiste
- Borde Mirassou
- Nouque
- la Palue
- Pelet
- Cabane de Pourcibo
- Borde de Soudious
- Borde Soule
- Borde Souperbie
- Cabanes de Souperret
- Borde Suza

=== Toponymy ===
The name Accous appears in the following forms:

- Aspa Luca (appeared in the Antonine Itinerary)
- Achoss and Achost (1154, Jean-Louis Vignau)
- Acos (1247, Fors of Aspe)
- Aquos d'Aspe (1376 Béarnais military inspection)
- Aquos (1385, Census of Béarn)
- Abadie de Cos (1538, Reformation of Béarn)
- Sanctus Martinus de Acous (1608, Insinuations of the Diocese of Oloron)
- Acous (1750 on the Cassini Map and 1801 Bulletin des lois).

The name of the commune in Gascon is Acós.

Brigitte Jobbé-Duval hypothesises that Accous originated from Acca or Acco, a woman's name mentioned in the inscriptions of Spain.

The name Appatie (cf. Basque Aphatea) came from the Lay Abbey of Jouers through corruption of the word Abbadie (Abadie in standard Gascon). Note that in the Aspe Valley the voiceless consonants of Latin are preserved. This fief was a vassal of the Viscounts of Béarn.

Le Bois d'Arapoup is attested in 1863 in the Topographical Dictionary.

Aület is mentioned in the form Aulet in 1863 by the Topographical Dictionary.

Lhers is also cited in the dictionary.

The name La Berthe, a tributary of the Gave d'Aspe, is cited in the dictionary of 1863.

Despourrins (The Hill of) is also mentioned in 1863 in the Topographical Dictionary as a name taken from the poet Cyprien Despourrins who was buried there.

Izaure was a farm mentioned by Paul Raymond with the spellings:

- Usaure (1376, Béarnais military inspection F. 76),
- Ixaure, Isaurs, and Isaure (1385, Census of Béarn F. 73).

Jouers /juèrs/ was formerly Joertz (1345, Homages of Béarn), probably a metathesis of a Basque word Oïhartz a derivative of Oihan meaning 'forest'. It is found in the spelling Joers (1345) then Jouers (in 1712), and again Joers (1863).

The Col de Lourtica is the name of a hill between the communes of Accous and Aydius.

Saint-Christau was a chapel, mentioned by the dictionary of 1863.

Tillabé was a place in Accous reported by the dictionary in 1863 and also mentioned in the 18th century 2 in the form Le Tillaber (record of the proceedings of Accous). Paul Raymond said that Tillabé "was the place of meeting of the aldermen of the Aspe valley".

== History ==
Paul Raymond noted that the commune had a Lay Abbey, a vassal of the Viscounts of Béarn. In 1385, there were 74 "fires". Accous was the capital of the Aspe valley.

== Administration ==
List of Successive Mayors of Accous

From	To	Name
1977	1983	Gaston Larrensou
1983	1995	Louis Moulia
1995	2001	Gaston Larrensou
2001	2010	Jean-Pierre Casaux
2010	2014	Éric Bergez
2014	2020	Paule Bergés
2020	2026	Dany Barraud

=== Inter-communality ===
The town is part of five inter-communal organisations:

- the community of communes of Haut Béarn
- the Energy union in the Pyrenees-Atlantiques
- the Television union of Oloron - Aspe Valley
- the inter-communal union to aid education in the Aspe Valley
- the joint union of Upper-Béarn.

=== Twinning ===
Accous has twinning associations with:

- Valle de Hecho (Spain) since 1978.

== Population ==
Historical population

Year	Pop.	±% p.a.
1793	1,053	—
1800	1,509	+5.27%
1806	1,573	+0.69%
1821	1,651	+0.32%
1831	1,606	−0.28%
1836	1,627	+0.26%
1841	1,586	−0.51%
1846	1,530	−0.72%
1851	1,531	+0.01%
1856	1,591	+0.77%
1861	1,508	−1.07%
1866	1,440	−0.92%
1872	1,429	−0.13%
1876	1,369	−1.07%
1881	1,302	−1.00%
1886	1,274	−0.43%
1891	1,102	−2.86%
1896	1,072	−0.55%
1901	1,033	−0.74%

Year	Pop.	±% p.a.
1906	1,024	−0.17%
1911	1,050	+0.50%
1921	1,025	−0.24%
1926	849	−3.70%
1931	888	+0.90%
1936	803	−1.99%
1946	649	−2.11%
1954	612	−0.73%
1962	499	−2.52%
1968	443	−1.96%
1975	440	−0.10%
1982	372	−2.37%
1990	396	+0.78%
1999	434	+1.02%
2007	431	−0.09%
2012	442	+0.51%
2017	461	+0.85%
2023	471	+0.36%

Source: EHESS and INSEE

== Economy ==
The economy of the town is primarily oriented toward agriculture and animal husbandry. The cheese-making farms are also one of the resources of the commune, which is part of the Appellation d'origine contrôlée (AOC) zone designation of Ossau-Iraty cheese.

The Toyal plant (a subsidiary of Toyo Aluminium, which produces aluminum powders and pigments, and anti-corrosive coatings), located at the edge of the commune, provides income to Accous through business tax, making of it the richest communes in the valley. This activity has created hundreds of jobs in the valley.

The median net disposible income per household was €19,610 in 2017, which is lower than the figure for the Pyrénées-Atlantiques department (€21,250).

== Sights ==
Accous has a number of old houses and farms registered as historical monuments. These are:

- House at Rue de Baix (16th century)
- House 1 at Rue de Haut (17th century)
- House 2 at Rue de Haut (17th century)
- House at Rue Madrih (18th century)

The Accous railway station on the Pau to Canfranc line has been closed to traffic since 1970.

The eco-museum of the Aspe valley is located in an old cheese factory. The manufacturing techniques of making mountain cheese and local culinary traditions are highlighted in the displays.

Several churches in the commune have been listed as historical monuments. These are:

- Chapel of Saint-Saturnin (12th century)
- Parish Church of Saint-Martin (1358) The church contains two historical objects. These are:
  - 4 Candlesticks (18th century)
  - Retable and Statuettes on the main Altar (18th century)
- Chapel of Saint-Jean-Baptiste at Lhers (1707)
- Chapel of Saint-Christophe at Aület was built at the end of the 18th century, rebuilt at the end of the 19th century, then restored in the 20th century.

=== Gallery ===
Church of Saint Martin

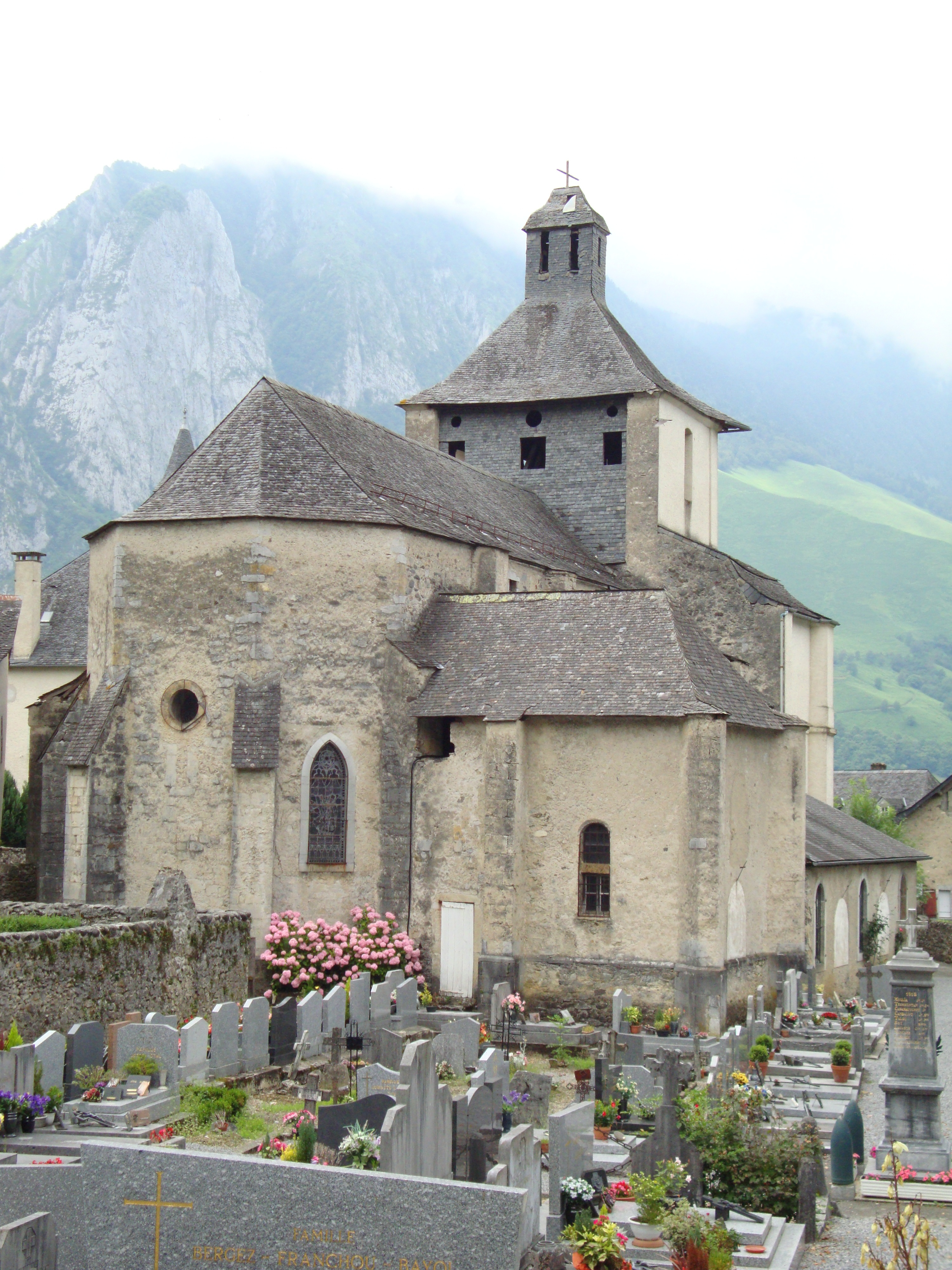
View of the Cemetery and Church of Saint-Martin

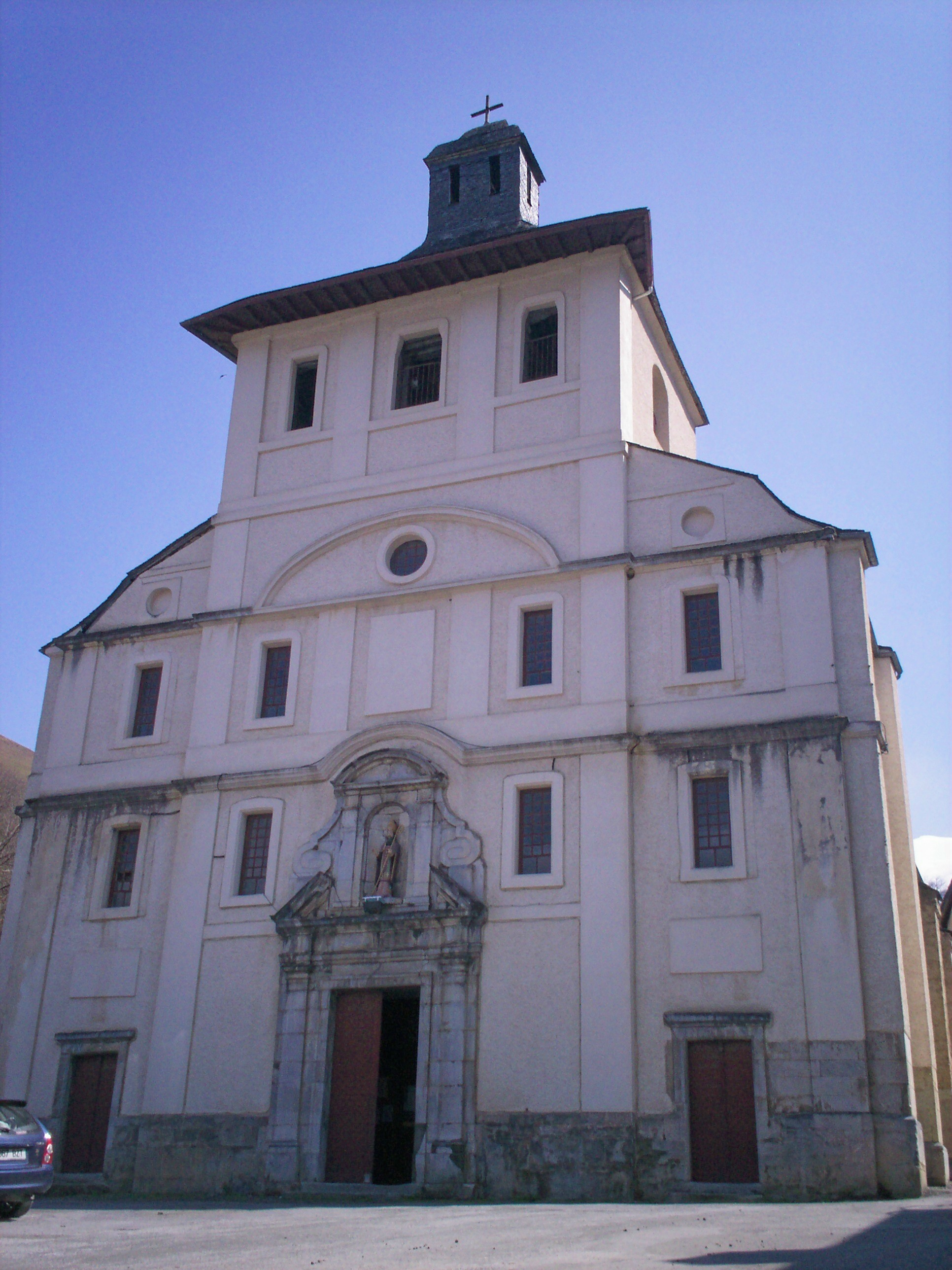
Facade of the Church of Saint-Martin

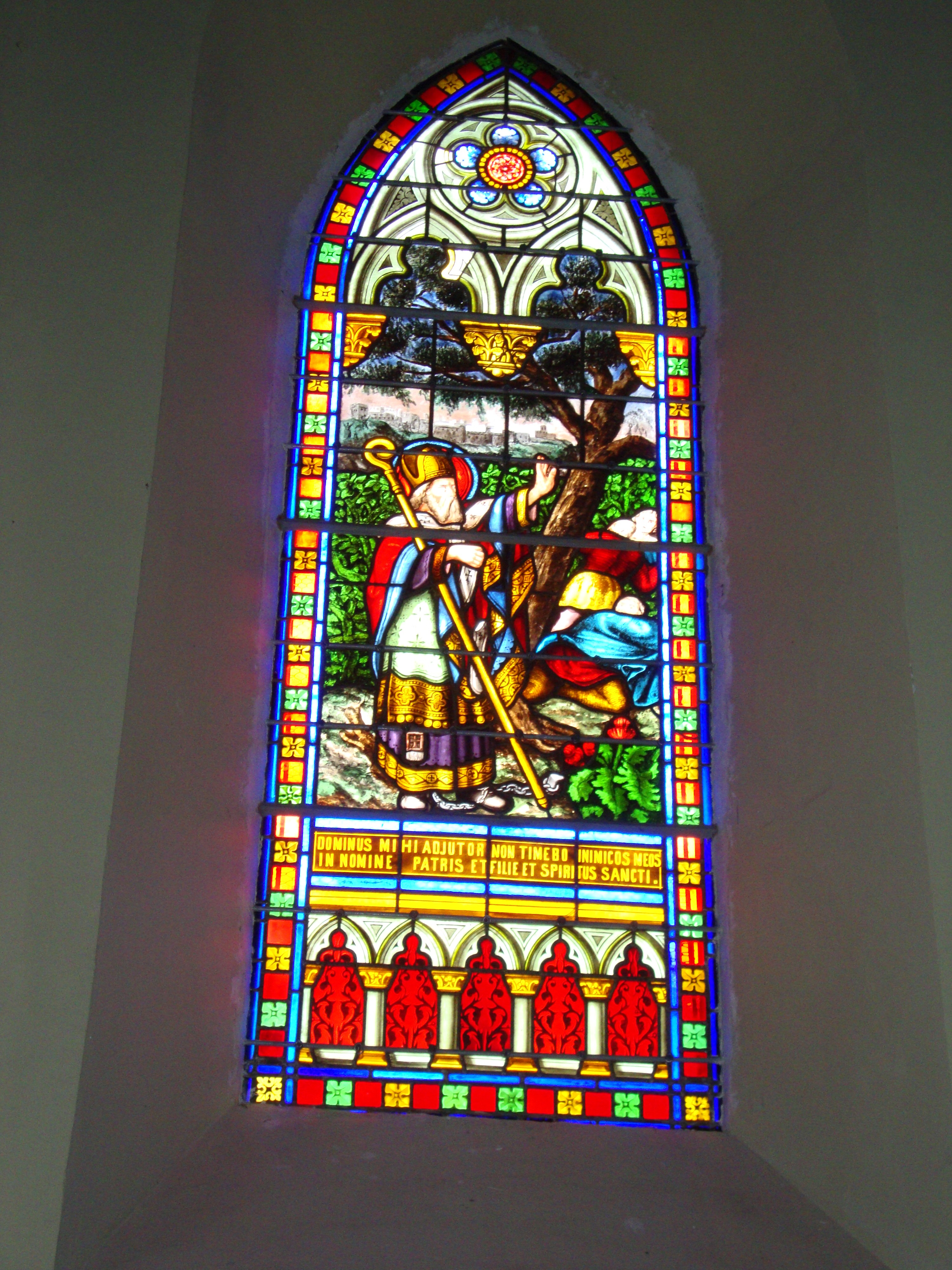
One of the Windows of the Church of Saint-Martin

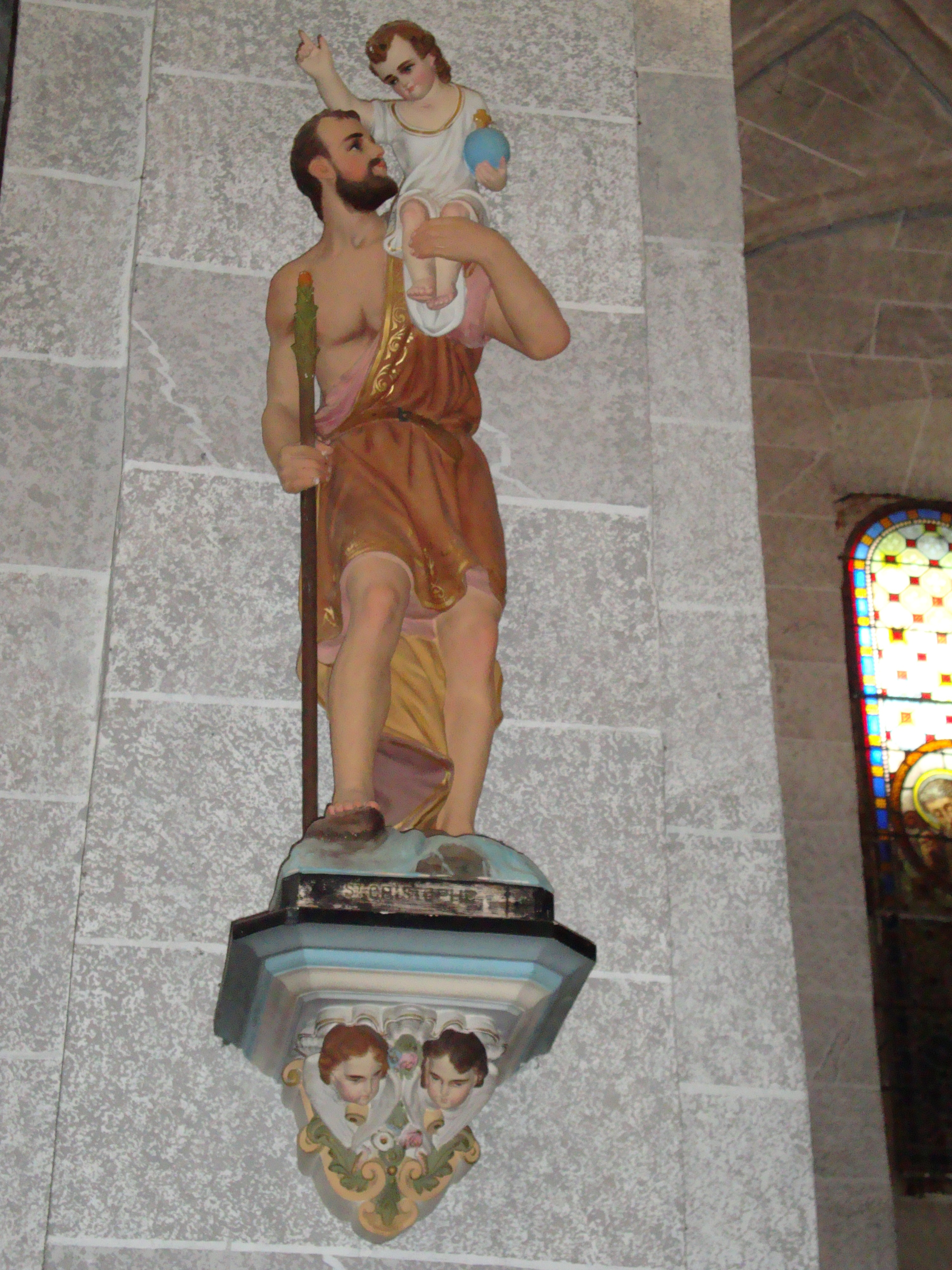
St. Cristopher statue at the Church of Saint-Martin

The chapel of Saint-Saturnin at Jouers

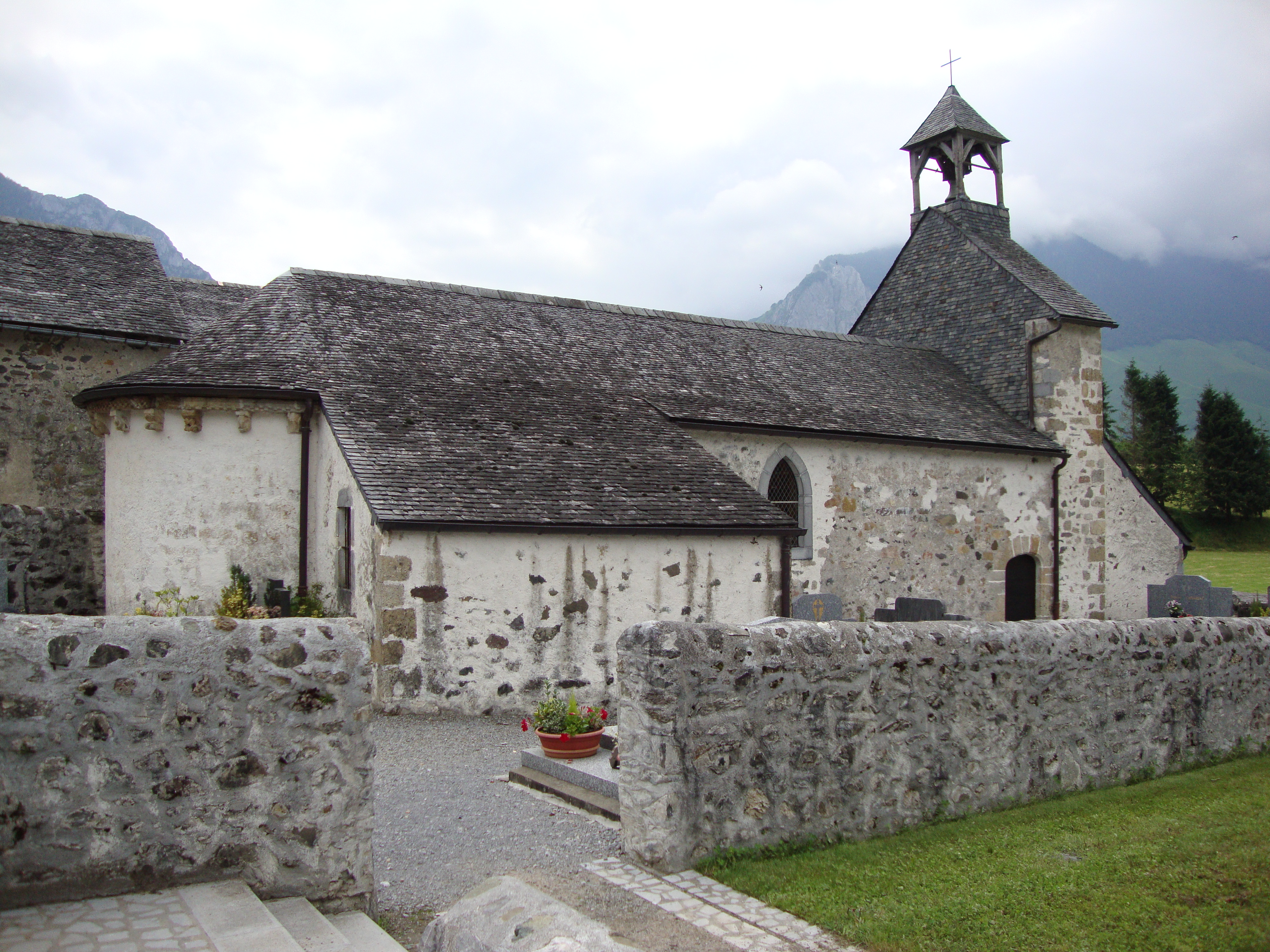
Side View

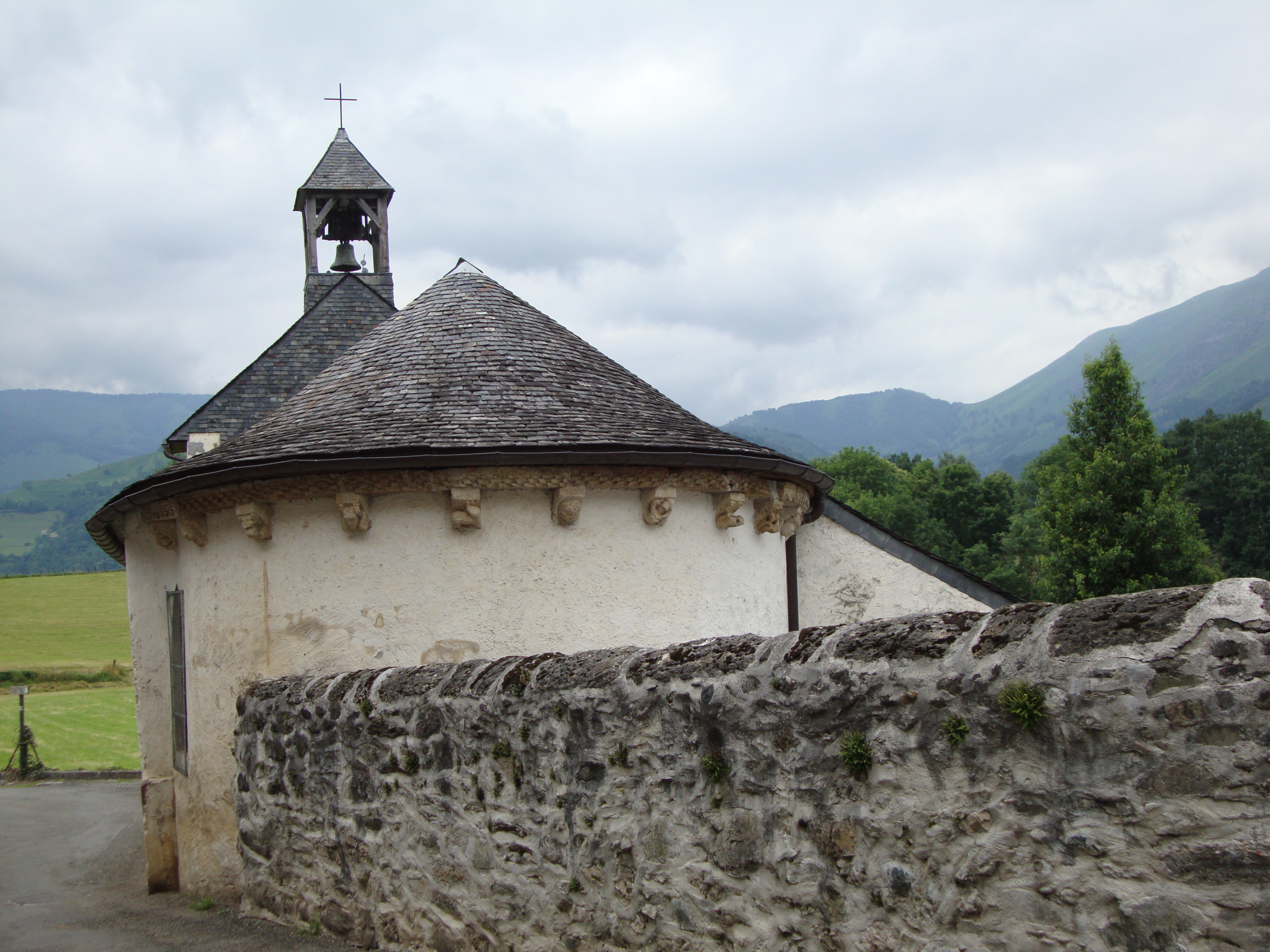
Street view

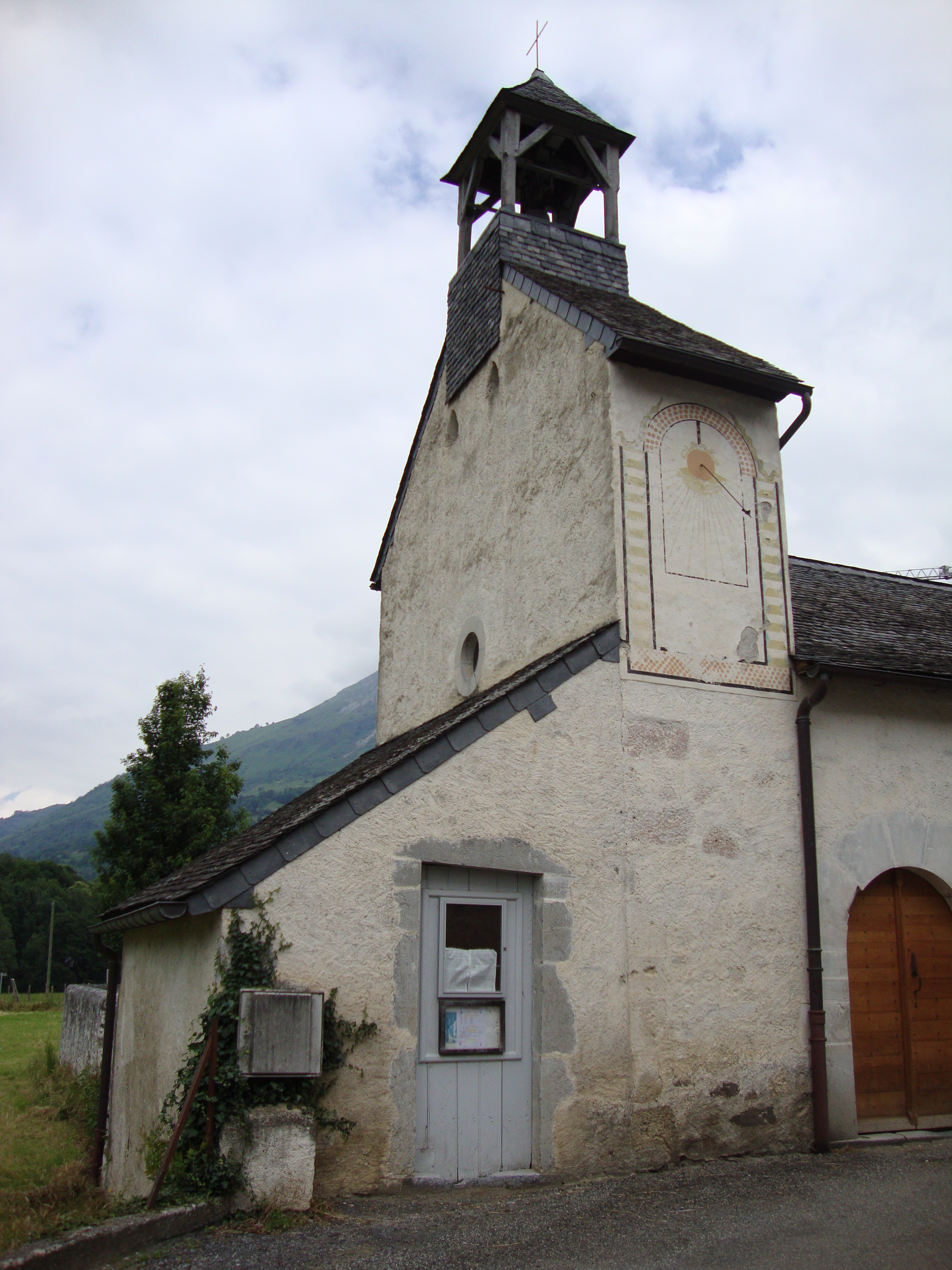
Clock tower and sundial

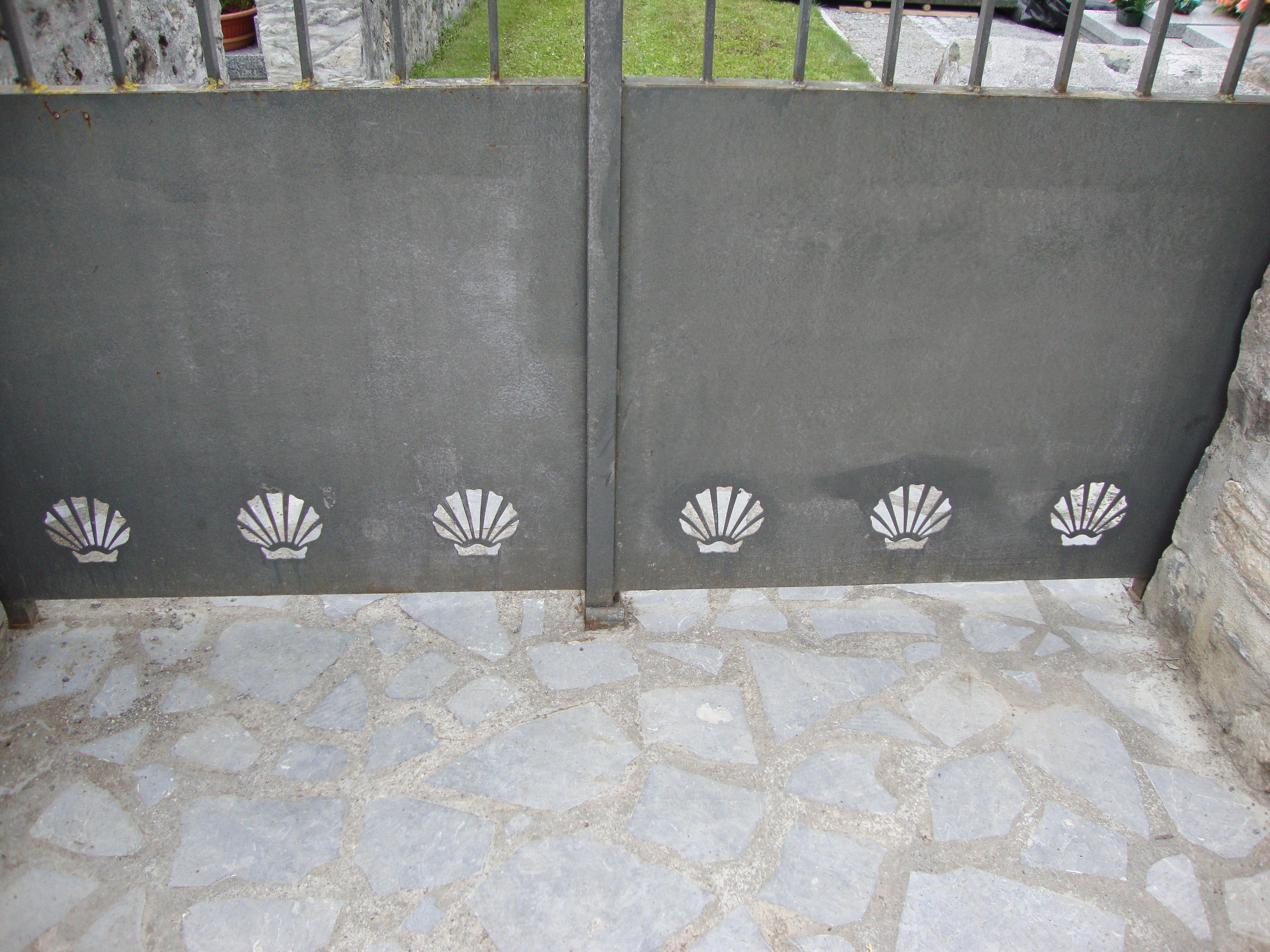
Cemetery gate with scallop shells

The Chapel of Saint-Christau at Aület was rebuilt in the 17th century near three miraculous fountains. Only the first remains, on the east side, consisting of a medieval stone basin and cover. It has been renovated.

There is also an Abbey of the order of Norbertine in Accous.

Accous is on the route of the "via Tolosane": Latin name of one of the four trails in France for pilgrimage to St-Jacques-de-Compostolla. The via Tolosane starts in Arles via Toulouse (hence the name) to the Spanish border at Col du Somport.

=== Environmental heritage ===
Some peaks in the commune are:

- Isabe peak 2463 m
- Permayou peak: 2344 m
- Mardas 2188 m
- Montagne de Isaye 2173 m
- Montagne de Liard 2169 m
- Bergon peak: 2148 m
- Montagne de Ponce 2028 m

== Facilities ==
=== Education ===
The town has a primary school, the école du bourg.

=== Sport and sports structures ===
Accous is a famous spot for paragliding in the Pyrenees. There are two paragliding schools in the commune:

- Ascendance and
- Air attitude

=== Accommodations ===
Accous also has communal lodgings.

== Notable People linked to the common ==
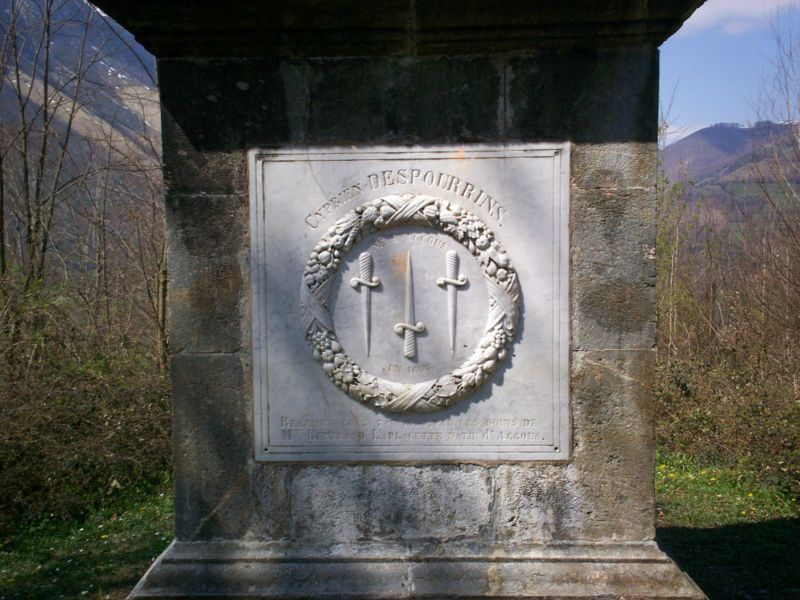
Monument to Cyprien Despourrins, blazened with three swords representing the arms of his family and his father who won three duels

- Cyprien Despourrins was born and died in Accous (1698-1759). He was a Béarnais poet using the Occitan language and author of famous and iconic songs of Béarn.
- Bernard Lacoarret (early 18th century), a native of Accous, a lawyer at the Parliament of Navarre.
- Henri Lillaz, born in 1881 in Sainte-Colombe-lès-Vienne and died in 1949 in Paris. He was a politician and general counsel for Accous from 1919 to 1937
- Bertrand Lacaste (1897–1994), was born and died in Accous. He was Bishop of Oran from 1946 to 1972.

== Other pictures ==
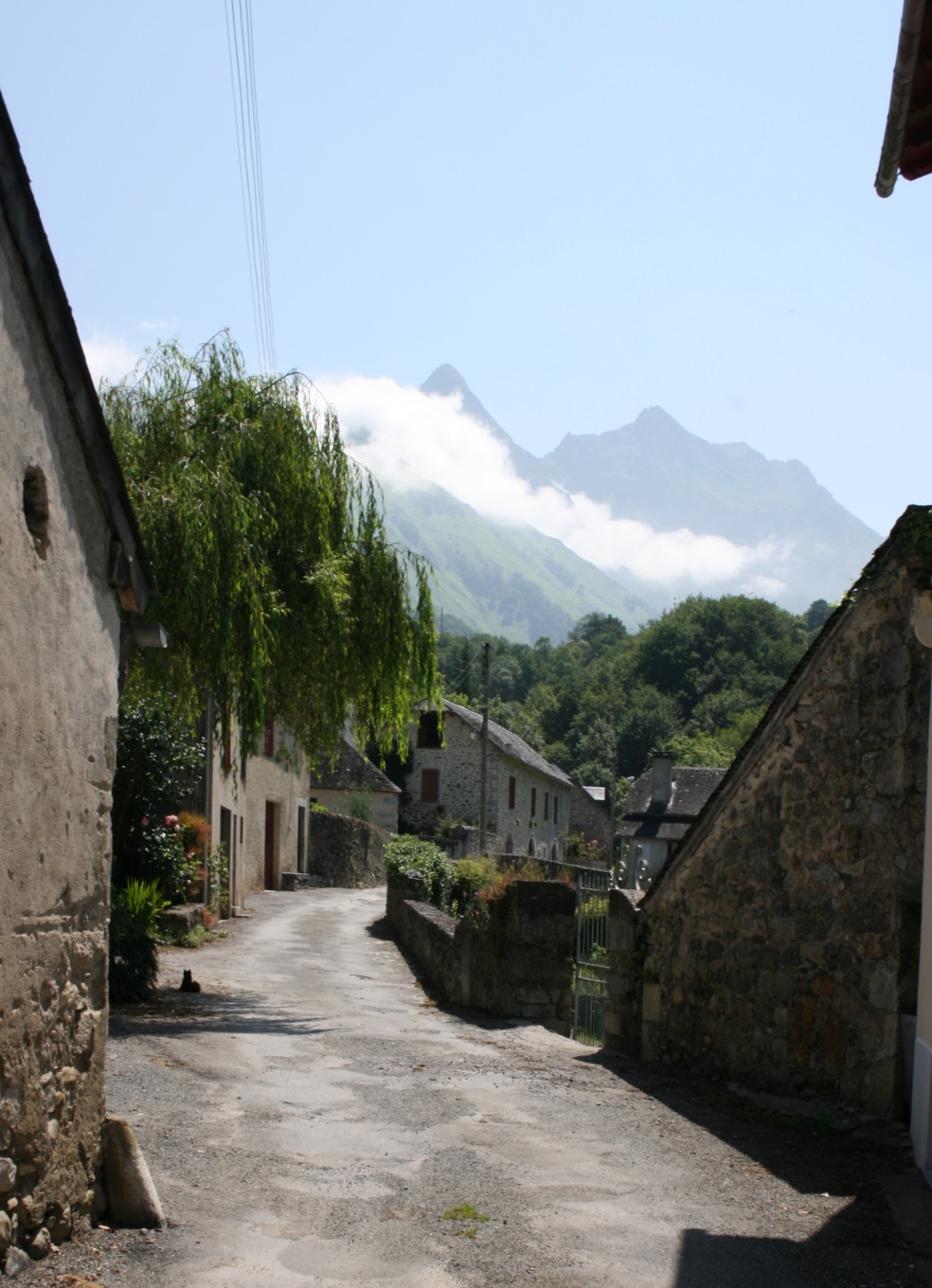
The Pyrenees from Accous town

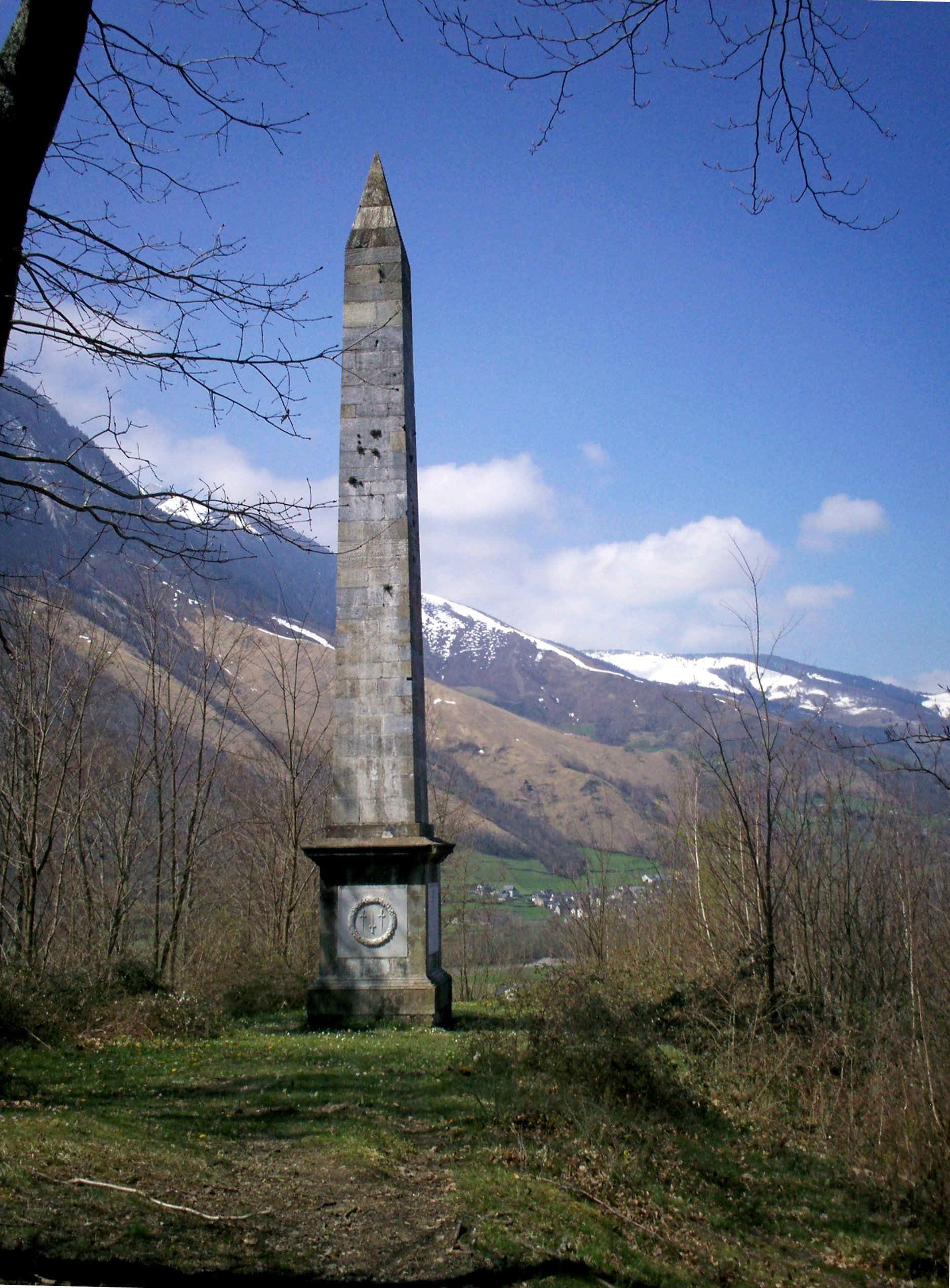
The Obelisk for Cyprien Despourrins

== See also ==
- Communes of the Pyrénées-Atlantiques department

=== External links ===
- Accous on Géoportail, National Geographic Institute (IGN) website (in French)
- Acous on the 1750 Cassini Map
