= Arnaud de Salette =

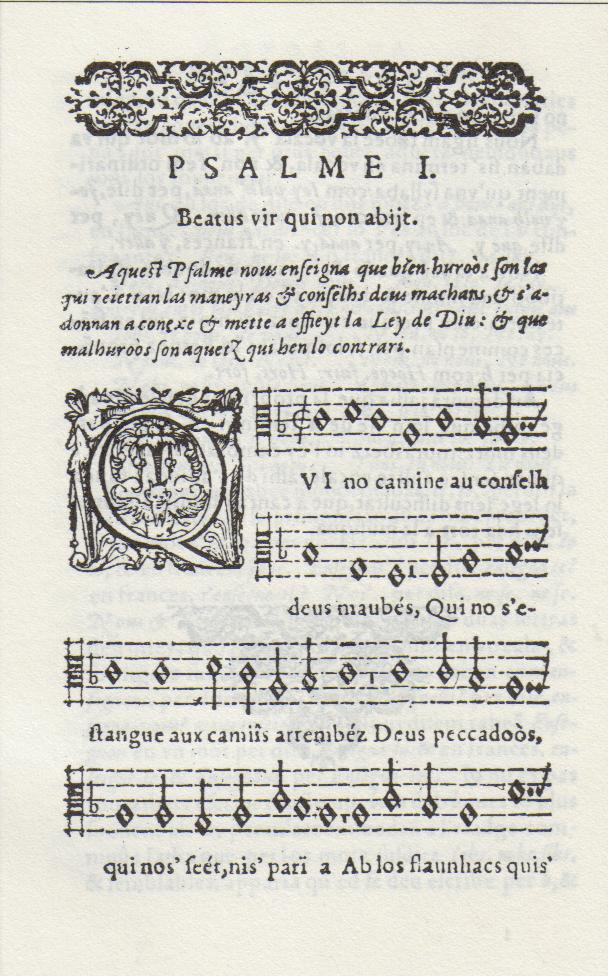
1583 edition of Salette's translation with its score

Arnaud de Saleta was a cleric and Béarnese poet who served during the establishment of a Protestant state in the Kingdom of Navarra in the 16th century.

De Salette is one of two poets to be commissioned by Queen Jeanne d'Albret to translate the Psalms into Occitan language in 1568 (the other being Pey de Garros who made a translation into the Gascon dialect). His translation was published in 1583 with its music score under the title "Psalmes de David metuts en rima bernesa".

According to critic Robèrt Lafont, Arnaud de Salette is the first known Béarnese writer to use the dialect rather than the standard Occitan language.

== Bibliography ==
- Salette, Arnaud de. Los Psalmes de David Metuts en Rima Bernesa. Orthez : Per Noste, 1983.
- Anatole, Christian - Lafont, Robèrt. Nouvelle histoire de la littérature occitane. Paris : P.U.F., 1970.
- Arnaud de Salette et son temps : le Béarn sous Jeanne d'Albret : colloque international d'Orthez, 16, 17 et 18 février 1983. Orthez : Per Noste, 1984.
