= Pey de Garros =

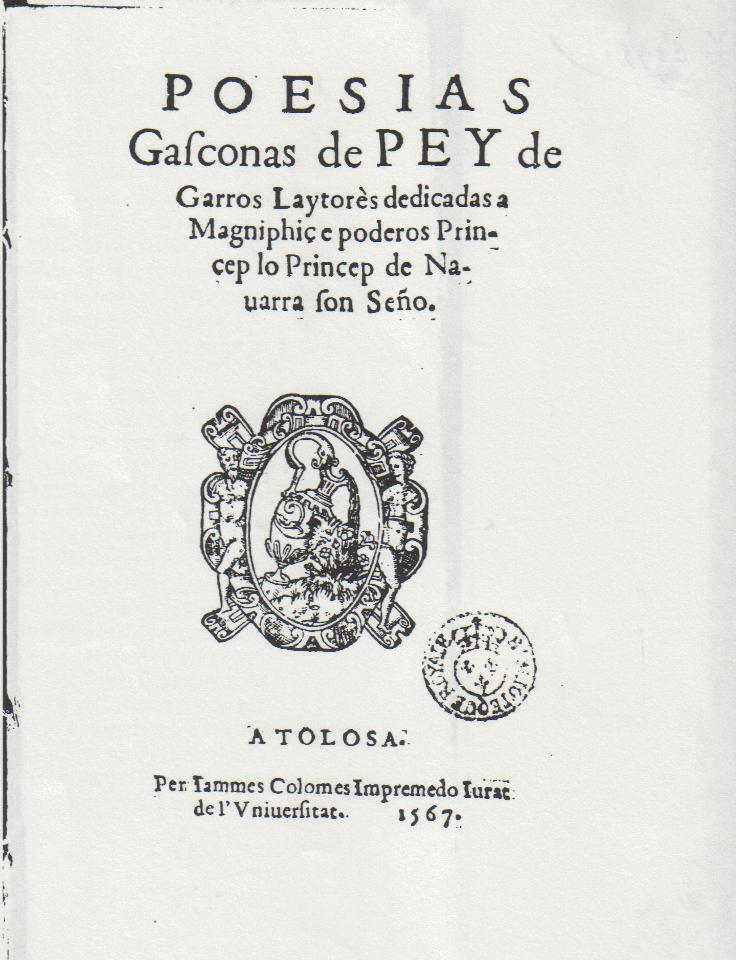
Title page of the Poesias Gasconas

Pey de Garros (modern Gascon: Pèir de Garròs; 1530–1585), was the most important Occitan poet of the Renaissance. He was instrumental in the evolution of the Gascon dialect into a literary language.

Garros was born at Lectoure, Gascony. He studied law, theology, and Hebrew at the University of Toulouse and served as the avocat-général of Pau for a time. He strove to restore the Gascon dialect to prominence, translating the Psalms into Gascon in 1565, as well as publishing a volume of poetry (Poesias Gasconas) in 1567.

The translation was ordered by Queen Jeanne d'Albret, who decreed Calvinism to be the official faith in the Kingdom of Navarre, as well as commissioning Arnaud de Salette to produce a distinct Béarnese translation of the Psalms.

Garros died in Pau.

== Online edition ==
- Poesias Gasconas, National French Library's gallica.bnf.fr website
