= Simin Palay =

French writer

Jean-Maximin called Simin Palay, (Occitan: Simin Palai), (1874–1965) was a French writer; as a native Béarnese speaker, he wrote poetry and articles in this language. He also made numerous philology studies on Béarnese and gascon languages.

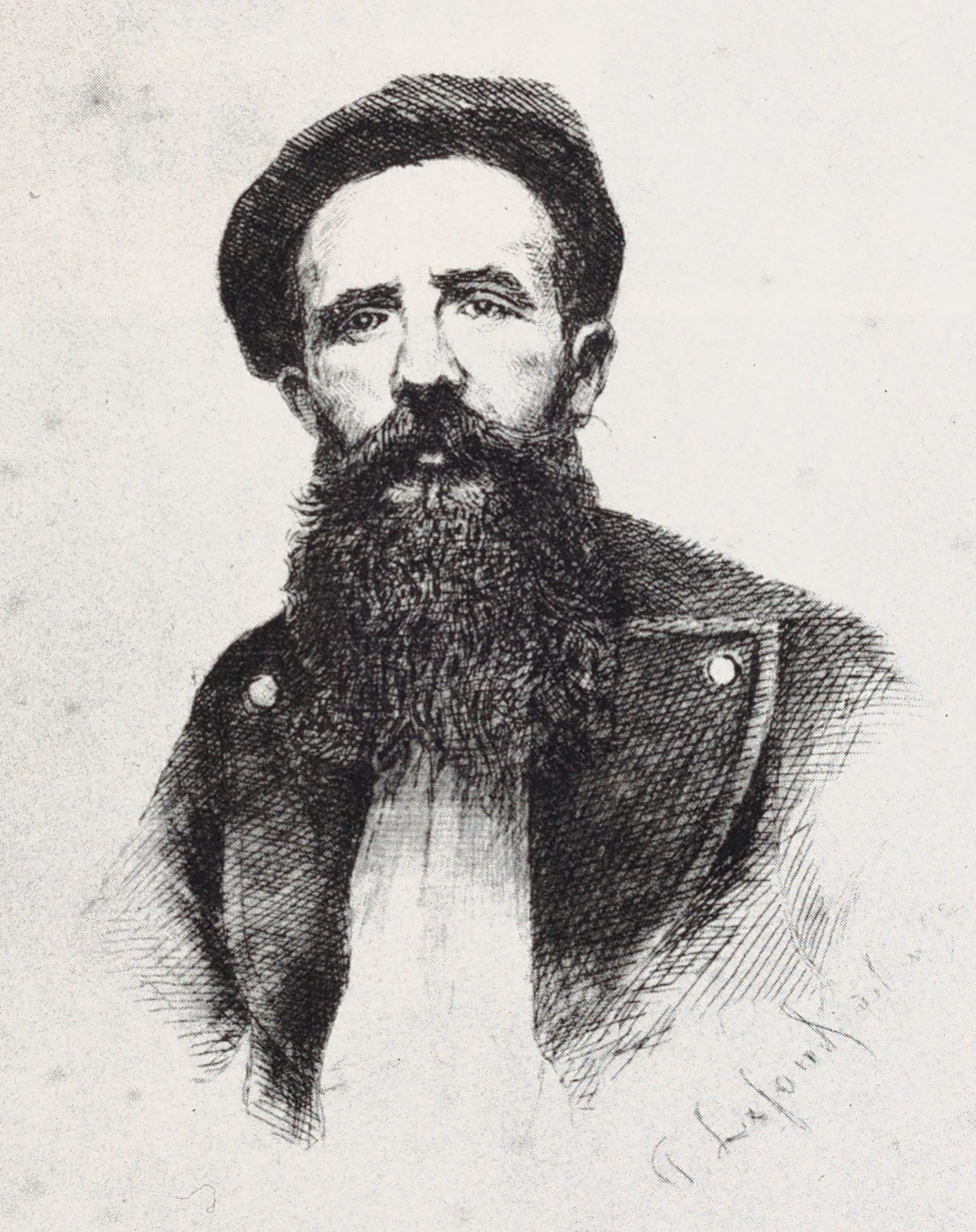
Simin Palay

== Biography ==
Simin Palay was born at Casteide-Doat, on the border between Béarn and Bigorre, on 29 May 1874. He died at Gelos on 22 February 1965.

== Selected bibliography ==
=== Poetry ===
- Bercets dé youénésse è coundes enta rise (1899)
- Sounets è quatourzis (1902)
- Case! (1909)
- Les Pregàries e las Gràcies (1926)
- Lou Bent qui passe (1958)

=== Lexicography ===
- Dictionnaire du Gascon et béarnais modernes

=== Ethnography ===
- Autour de la table béarnaise (1932)
- La cuisine du pays (1936)
- Cansous entàus maynàdyes sus lous àyres (1900)
- Cansous trufanderes (1924)
- Chants de Béarn et de Gascogne (1951), in collaboration J.Poueigh
