= Cyprien Despourrins =

Gascon-language poet and politician from Béarn, France

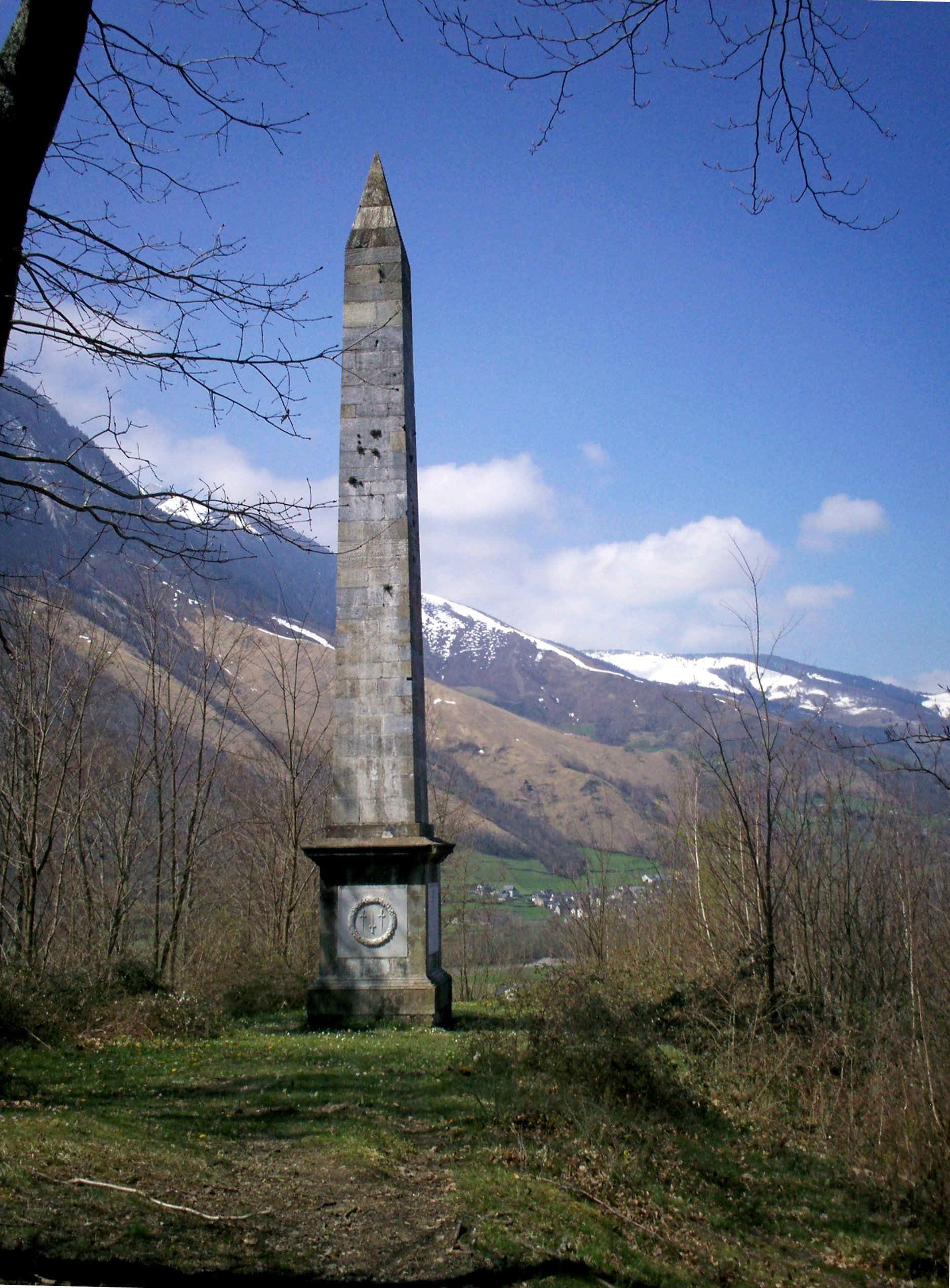
- Accous, obelisk in memory of Cyprien Despourrins
- Born: 1698; Accous, Béarn
- Died: 1759 (aged 60–61); Château de Miramont, Adast
- Occupations: Poet, Parliamentarian

Cyprien Despourrins (1698, Accous – 1759, Adast) was a Gascon-language poet from Béarn and a member of the Bigorre parliament.

Originally a family of shepherds, one of his ancestors bought the Juzan Abbey upon his return to the Aspe valley after making his fortune in Spain. Cyprien was the son of Pierre Despourrins and Gabrielle de Miramont. His two brothers, Joseph and Pierre, were the curate and vicar respectively of Accous. In 1746, after their mother inherited the Château de Miramont after her older brother, the family left the Aspe valley and settled in Adast.

His songs, written in a dialect of Béarn, became famous traditional folk songs emblematic of the region. Many of them were performed at the court of Louis XV for the Marquise de Pompadour by the celebrated tenor Pierre Jélyotte, who himself was from Béarn.

In 1840, an obelisk dedicated to Despourrins was erected in his hometown of Accous. The obelisk was inscribed with two poems, one by the Béarnais poet Xavier Navarrot and one by the Gascon poet Jasmin.

Another monument, a stele dedicated to the poet, was inaugurated in 1867 in Adast, near his mother's castle.
