= Georges d'Esparbès =

French novelist

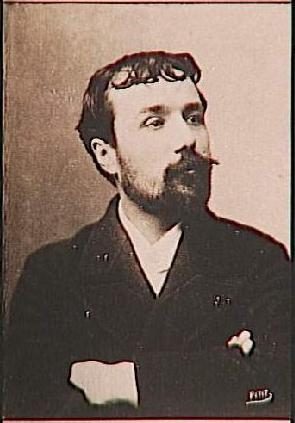
- Born: 24 March 1863; Valence-d'Agen, France
- Died: 25 June 1944 (aged 81); Paris, France
- Occupation: Writer

Georges d'Esparbès (24 March 1863 - 25 June 1944) was a French novelist. Three film versions were made of his work Les demi-soldes, set during the Napoleonic era.

== Bibliography ==
- Klossner, Michael. The Europe of 1500-1815 on Film and Television: A Worldwide Filmography of Over 2550 Works, 1895 Through 2000. McFarland & Company, 2002.
