= Alejo Peyret =

Argentine politician and historian (1826–1902)

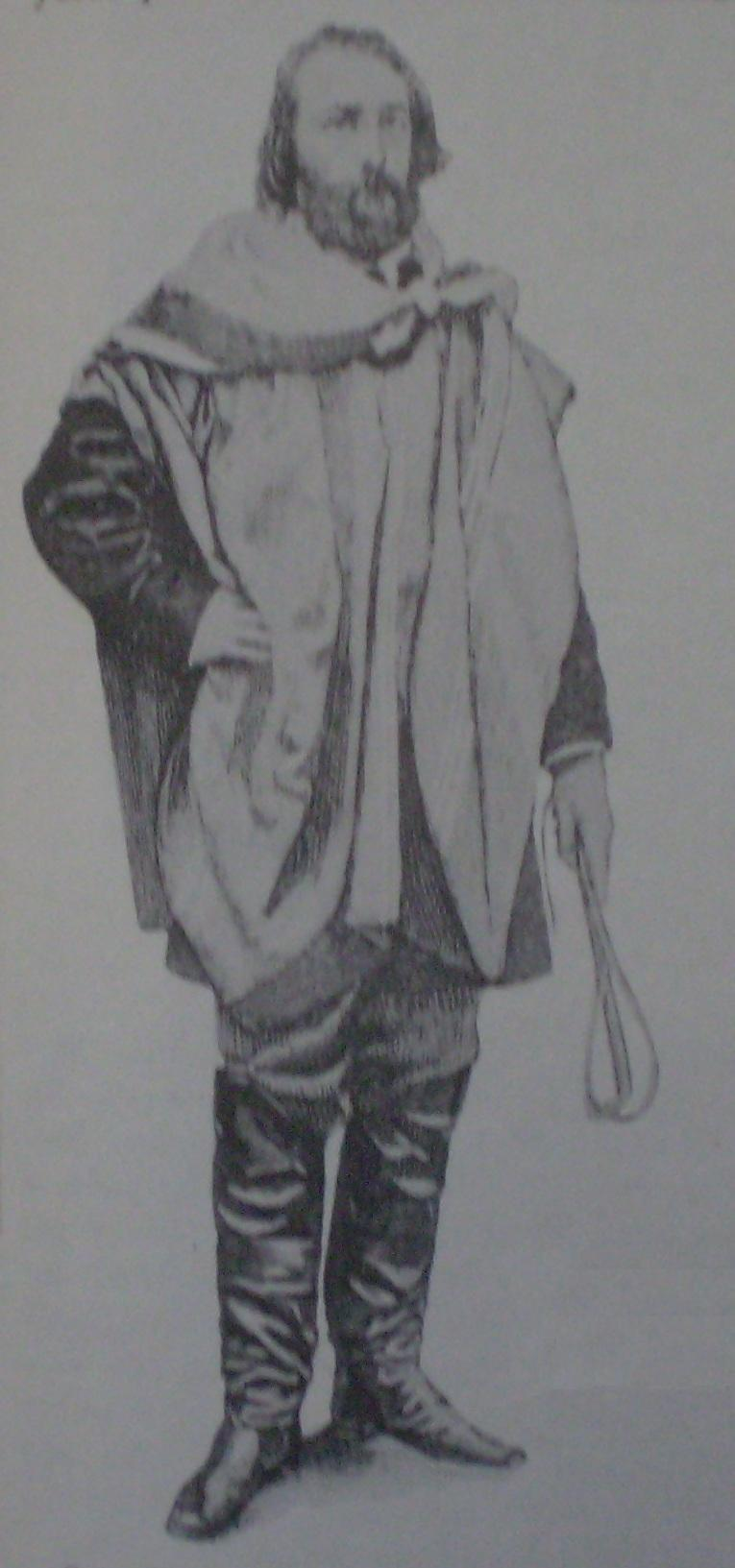
Alejo Peyret

Alejo Peyret (French: Alexis Pierre-Louis Edouard Peyret; December 11, 1826 – August 27, 1902) was a French-born Argentine writer, agronomist, colonial administrator, and historian. Emigrating to Argentina when he was 25, he became a prominent figure in the history of Entre Ríos Province.

== Youth in France ==
Peyret was born in 1826 in Serres Castet, Canton Morlaàs, in the department of Basses-Pyrénées, today Pyrénées-Atlantiques, the son of Alexis Augustin Peyret and Marie Angelique Cecile Armance Vignancour. He entered the Royal College of Pau at the age of ten. In 1844, at the age of eighteen, he earned a bachelor's degree in science and letters. He avoided compulsory military service by hiring a paid substitute to serve in his place. He studied law at the Collège de France, where his professors included the philosopher Edgar Quinet and the historian Jules Michelet. He became involved with political radicalism, writing editorials in support of republicanism, democracy, anticlericalism, and socialism, and of the Revolutions of 1848 in particular. He was tried for his activities, but acquitted of wrongdoing.

In the 1852 election, Peyret stood as a candidate for the Department of Basses-Pyrénées. Following the electoral landslide of the Bonapartists and the establishment of the Second Empire under Napoleon III, Peyret left the country

== Arrival in Argentina ==
Peyret arrived in Montevideo on November 4, 1852. Here, he wrote for El Comercio del Plata, a periodical edited by José María Cantilo. Alberto Larroque, president of the College of Uruguay (in Concepción del Uruguay) offered him a professorship. The minister of Justice, Worship, and Public Instruction, Juan María Gutiérrez, designated him head of the French and Geography departments beginning June 5, 1855. He remained in this position until September 4, 1856. He served as an editor of the biweekly El Uruguay under the direction of Benjamín Victorica. He spearheaded the creation of La Cosmopolita Society of Mutual Aid on August 31, 1856, in Concepción del Uruguay. In September of that year, Peyret relocated to Paraná to assume control of El Nacional Argentino, an organization in support of the Confederation. He remained in Paraná until July 1857 "except for one month's interruption (May – June) which I spent in Uruguay [Concepción del Uruguay] to see Euristela". "Euristela" is a reference to Josefa Auristela Caraballo, with whom Peyret had his two first children, Nieves Emilia and Luis Alejo.

== Colonialism and agriculture ==
On July 11, 1857, he was appointed administrator and director of San José Colony by President Justo José de Urquiza. In fulfillment of his instructions, he published a series of articles in El Uruguay during April, May, and June 1860 in which he called upon the colonists to be hardworking, "whatever may be their religious opinions or the beliefs to which they subscribe". The notes were translated into French and collected in a pamphlet entitled Emigration et Colonisation: La Colonie San José.

Under his direction, the colony began cultivating peanuts, potatoes, sweet potatoes, beans, onions, sugar beets, maize, and tobacco. Peyret also introduced superior techniques for growing wheat and he lobbied Urquiza for new land on which to establish an experimental station for growing cotton. He experimented with caper spurge and the adaptability of silkworms to the local climate. He built a factory for the manufacture of peanut oil. For his work with potato farming, he received an honorable mention at the National Exposition of Córdoba held between October 15 and January 21, 1872. On January 3 he sent the chief commissioner of the Exposition a report on the state of Colonia San José and Villa de Colón and the prospect of future colonization of Entre Ríos Province.

Over the course of thirteen years Peyret served as administrator, director, justice of the peace, commissioner, president of the municipality of San José and officer of the first civil registry, which was created in 1873 in Colón to settle disputes between brides belonging to different religions. Beginning in 1865 he was a member of the Public Works Commission of Colón, whose function was to oversee the construction of the church, collecting funds and reporting to the government on their investment. Peyret resigned from the commission on December 31, 1872. When President Domingo Faustino Sarmiento made a visit to Colón and San José on February 6, 1870, it fell to Peyret, as chief of the "party committee", to arrange the official welcome.

Peyret was married on July 7, 1866, to María Celerina Pinget, born in Vinzier, Haute-Savoie, the daughter of Gabriel Pinget and Luisa Viollaz.

== Freemasonry ==
Initiated into Freemasonry in France, Peyret became an active member of George Washington Lodge #44 in Concepción del Uruguay, which he joined in 1864. In 1868 he received the third degree and became a master mason. He served two consecutive terms as Orator, from 1877 to 1878 and 1878 to 1879. On October 25 he inaugurated the public conferences of the lodge. In Buenos Aires he had already assisted, on January 16, 1887, in inaugurating the Lodge L'Amie des Naufrages, and had been named an honorary member.

== Political activism ==
In August 1871 he drafted a plan for a Constitution for the French Republic, dedicated to president Louis-Adolphe Thiers and with a preface founded in his juridico-political theory. The preface was later published in La República in November 1871.

Beginning on June 9, 1873, he sent a series of unsigned letters to the Buenos Aires daily La República in which he denounced the assassination of Urquiza on April 11, 1870, and condemned the federal intervention against the Province of Entre Ríos, arguing that it violated the principles of federalism and provincial autonomy. He declared that Ricardo López Jordán had embodied the hopes of the people of Entre Ríos, at the same time maintaining that the true aim of the armed intervention ordered by Domingo F. Sarmiento had been to assure the success of the presidential candidacy of Nicolás Avellaneda. He argued that although Dr. Leónidas Echagüe could not have remained in control of the government of Entre Ríos, Ricardo López Jordán should not have replaced him so soon after Urquiza's violent death. Peyret used this argument in response to accusations of crypto-Jordanism.

As only six of the fifteen letters sent were published, Peyret collected them into Letters on the Intervention against the Province of Entre Ríos, which he published under the pseudonym "A foreigner". The author's identity did not stay secret to his contemporaries, and this error in judgment cost him the job of administrator of San José and forced him to leave the province where he had spent eighteen years. In a letter to Benjamín Victorica written in Buenos Aires on March 3, 1874, he wrote "...It would have been better not to concern myself with politics. I don't know how I forgot the advice of Mr. Pedro de Angelis. I gave in to a moment of irritation and impatience, seeing that we had been thrown into yet another war which was to last an entire year. I am always at your service and believe you will remain always at mine, despite my recklessness". In March 1874 he resigned his position as head of the colony and was replaced temporarily by Rodolfo Siegrist until April 30; in June, in Buenos Aires, Dolores Costa de Urquiza designated him the agent in charge of selecting and transporting colonists to the colony of Caseros.

== Academic and literary career ==
Peyret published Bearnese Stories in Concepción del Uruguay in 1870. The work was translated into French and Occitan in Paris in 1890. He did as much as he could to preserve the language of his native region and his Bearnese Stories won the praise of Pierre-Jean de Béranger.

On July 13, 1874, he was nominated by Dr. Vicente Fidel López, president of the University of Buenos Aires, to occupy the vacant chief professorship of the French department, in the Faculty of Humanities and Philosophy; dean Andrés Lamas expressed his agreement and communicated with Peyret. On April 13, 1876, Peyret sent his resignation from Concepción del Uruguay. On March 31, 1876, he was named professor of world history for all six grades of the National College of Uruguay, and was subsequently appointed in 1879 to teach a special course on the history of free universities. He continued at the college until August 17, 1883, when he resigned in order to relocate to Buenos Aires.

The George Washington Lodge agreed in 1877 at Peyret's proposal to form a commission headed by Peyret to study "the situation afflicting numerous students who cannot pursue their studies due to lack of resources". This led to the establishment of the educational society La Fraternidad, which sought to protect and provide housing for students of the College of Uruguay. On August 23, 1880, he was named president of the provisional directive commission of the French Mutual Aid Society of Concepción del Uruguay and in 1882 was named its honorary president. The Office of Territories and Colonies commissioned him in 1881 to make a study of the possibilities of the territory of Misiones, a study which inspired him to write thirty letters published in the daily La Tribuna Nacional under the title Letters on Misiones.

A decree signed by president Julio Argentino Roca on August 18, 1883, authorized Peyret, having relocated to Buenos Aires, to teach the history of the free universities at the National College of Buenos Aires. He served this role until February 11, 1887. He wrote Contemporary History (Buenos Aires, Félix Lajouane, 1885), a textbook which would be used in normal schools and national colleges. In 1885 his book The Origins of Christianity was serialized in the Buenos Aires University Review, and the following year his work The American Thinker was published. At the same time he published History of Religions, which comprised a history and philosophical critique of prehistoric and historical religions and of Christianity. Another work on the subject was The Evolution of Christianity.

== Colonial administration ==
He was named Inspector of Colonies by a decree of president Miguel Juárez Celman on February 12, 1887. As a consequence of this role, he wrote A visit to the colonies of the Argentine Republic (Buenos Aires, 1889, with an introduction by Andrés Lamas), written in Spanish in two volumes and submitted by the government to the Exposition Universelle in Paris. It was simultaneously published in French as Une visite aux colonies de la République Argentine (Paris, 1889).

On May 10, 1889, the national government commissioned Peyret to study the agricultural machinery displayed at the Exposition. He received six thousand pesos to cover his expenses and was to present a descriptive report before the end of the Exposition. His report was titled The Agricultural Machines at the Universal Exposition of Paris.

He left for France on June 5, 1889, aboard the Río Negro with his wife Celerina Pinget and daughter Alfonsina. Thirty-seven years had passed since his self-imposed exile to Argentina. The International Socialist Congress met in Paris between July 14 and 21, during which it established the Second International. Peyret reported his activities during these days in a letter addressed to the governor of Entre Ríos, Clemente Basavilbaso, published on July 28 in a Paraná daily. According to his letter, he spent only the 20th at the Socialist Congress, whose sessions lasted the entire day. He left a more detailed account in his personal diary: on July 20, Saturday, he went to the congress, at the salon de Folies Parisiennes on the Boulevard Rochechouart. "I was announced as a delegate from the Argentine Republic, there was applause, but at that very moment I was leaving the room." The day's speaker was a member of the House of Commons, who spoke on the eight-hour workday On behalf of the Italian republicans of Buenos Aires, Peyret delivered a plaque commemorating the French Revolution to the Paris city council.

On April 1, 1892, he recorded: "I would have liked to have had the money I spent without reason in Concepción del Uruguay and Colonia San José. Had I put that money in a bank, I would be able to live off those savings. And my father: what he spent in Serres Castet! When I came to France the current owner of the property proposed to sell it to me, and I told him that no, he had taken me for a millionaire".

Peyret was named the representative of the Province of Entre Ríos to the 1st Provincial Agricultural Congress held in Esperanza, Santa Fe from May 24 to June 2, 1892. He was commissioned in June 1892 to write the history of Argentine colonization and was for a year granted a monthly salary of $500 "including his salary as Inspector of Colonies". In 1898 he decided that he had collected the necessary research to write the history and had begun the work, "to be completed when my health permits". He served as Inspector General of Colonies from early 1895 until January 16, 1900, when he retired.

== Retirement and death ==
On June 13, 1893, he was unanimously elected the first president of the French Alliance of Buenos Aires, whose committee met at the French Club. On December 13, 1885, in the presence of the federal judge Juan del Campillo, he swore the oath of citizenship on the Constitution. He requested retirement benefits on October 14, 1889, on the justification of his advanced age and poor health, naturalized Argentine citizenship, and physical infirmity after thirty-one years of service. President Julio Argentino Roca granted his request with a decree signed on February 19, 1900.

In his final year of life, he recorded his agronomic reminiscences in an article, "Colonia San José: How it was Founded", written in October 1901 and published in the review Urquiza. He died at his home at 176 General Urquiza Street in Buenos Aires on August 27, 1902, of chronic myocarditis. His interment in the Western Cemetery was attended by Julio Argentino Roca, his aide-de-camp Colonel David Marambio Catán, and a large audience.

The Masonic Review, an independent organ of international freemasonry, published "In memoriam, the Illustrious and Honorable Dr. Alejo Peyret: this Republic and more immediately Argentine freemasonry have lost one of their greatest thinkers, an indefatigable apostle of liberalism. By special decree, the Argentine Orient elects the Powerful and Honorable Francisco F. Fernandez to speak in the name of national freemasonry. The name of the Honorable Peyret is engraved in the memory of those he has taught to cultivate knowledge and love justice and truth".

At the request of his heirs, Peyret's ashes were moved to the cemetery of San José on November 26, 1995. The only items in his will were a plot of land in San José and a fraction of the homestead zone at the same colony.
