= Xavier Navarrot =

French Occitan-language poet

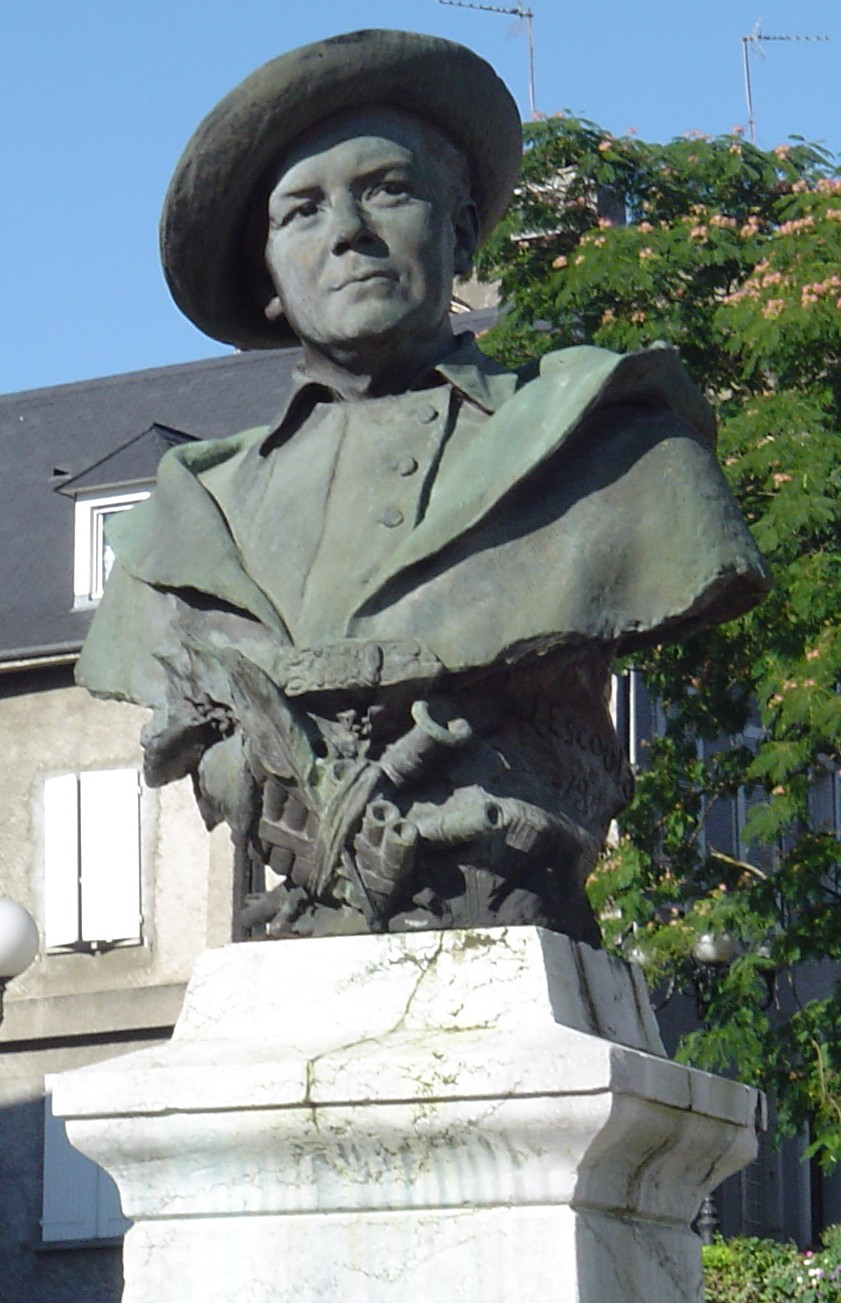
Bust of Navarrot in Oloron-Sainte-Marie

Jean-François Xavier Navarrot (Occitan: Joan Francés Xavièr Navarròt, IPA: [dʒuˈan fɾanˈses saˈβjɛɾ naβaˈrɔt]) was an Occitan language poet from Béarn.

He was born near Lucq-de-Béarn in a wealthy family and studied law and medicine in Paris before returning in Béarn where he spent the rest of his life.

He was a supporter of the republic and of progressivist ideas, which was humoristically stated in his poetry.

== Bibliography ==
- Navarrot, Xavier. Estrées Béarnéses en ta l'an 1820. Pau: Vignancourt, 1820.
- Navarrot, Xavier. Dialogue entré Moussu Matheü, l'Electou, y Jean de Mingequannas, lou Bouhèmi. Pau, 1838.
- Navarrot, Xavier. Nouvelles étrennes béarnaises pour l'année 1847. Pau: Véronèse, 1846.
- Navarrot, Xavier. À Messieurs les jurés. Pau: Thonnet, 1850.
- Lespy, Vastin. Chansons de Xavier Navarrot. Pau: Véronèse, 1868.
- Camélat, Michel. Obres. Samatan: Éditorial Occitan, 1924.

== Sources ==
- Darrigrand, Robert. Tèxtes causits. Montpellier: Centre d'études occitanes de l'Université, 1970.
- Anatole, Cristian; Lafont, Robèrt. Nouvelle histoire de la littérature occitane. Paris: P.U.F., 1970.
