= Somport =

Mountain pass between France and Spain

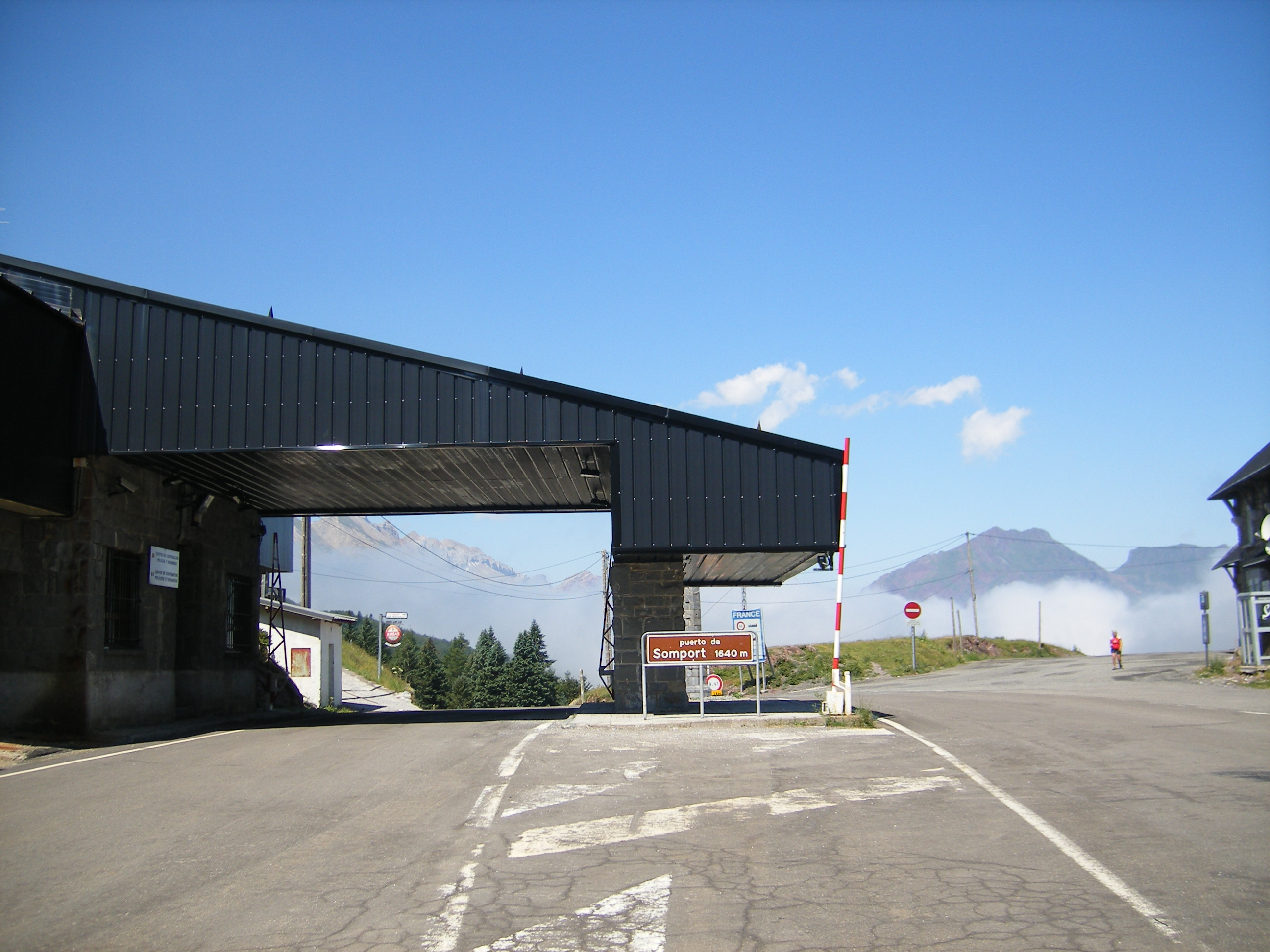
- Pass as seen from Spain

- Location within France
- Elevation: 1,632 metres (5,354 ft)
- Traversed by: road

Third Approach
- Location: France–Spain border
- Range: Pyrenees
- Coordinates: 42°47′37″N 00°32′45″W

Somport or Col du Somport, known also as the Aspe Pass or Canfranc Pass, (el. 1632 m.) is a mountain pass in the central Pyrenees on the border of France and Spain. Its name is derived from the Latin Summus portus. It was one of the most popular routes for soldiers, merchants, and pilgrims to the tomb of St. James following the route from Arles to cross the Pyrenees. They travelled from Oloron-Sainte-Marie, Pyrénées-Atlantiques, France, via Somport to Jaca, Aragon, Spain.

== Military history ==
There is recorded evidence of both the Vandals and the Visigothic invaders having used the relatively easy entrance to Spain from France in the fifth century. The Roman road constructed here, known as the Via Tolosana, was also used by Muslim invaders in the eighth century in their attempt to conquer France.

The pass was fortified in the 16th century by the Habsburgs in fear of French invasion, which however would not occur until the Peninsular War and the arrival of Napoleon's general Louis Gabriel Suchet in 1808. He was later followed by Colonel Leonard Morin who recorded in his Memoirs of the 5th Regiment (1812–13) both the danger of the pass and the horrible existence of the population of Canfranc. The French would leave by the same road after their defeat by General Francisco Espoz y Mina in 1814.

The Fort du Portalet is a fort in the Aspe valley north of the present Spain-France border which guards access to the Col du Somport. It was built by order of Louis Philippe I to guard the border of the Pyrenees. Installed against a cliff overlooking the Gave d'Aspe, it faces the path of Masts. It was begun in 1842 and finished in 1870, replacing an earlier structure a further north. During WWII Léon Blum, Édouard Daladier, Paul Reynaud, Georges Mandel and Maurice Gamelin were interned under the Vichy regime. After the war Philippe Pétain was imprisoned in the fort from 15 August to 16 November 1945.

== Pilgrimage history ==
This was arguably the most popular Pyrenaic pass for pilgrims on the Way of St. James until the pacification of Navarran and Basque bandits in the 12th century made the relatively easier Roncesvalles road safer for pilgrims. There is little of interest at the pass, except for the modern Ermita del Pilar (1992) and of course the natural beauty of the mountains. From this point to Santiago de Compostela it is approximately 840 km.

== Modern history ==
The Pau–Canfranc railway linking Canfranc, Spain with Pau, France opened to traffic in 1928, connected via the Somport Railway Tunnel which was completed in 1915, and terminating in Spain at the Canfranc International Railway Station. The railway line was closed due to a freight-train accident on 27 March 1970.

The 8.6 kilometres (5.3 mi) long Somport Road Tunnel was opened on 7 February 2003, at a cost of €160 million to Spain and €91.5 million for France. The building of the road tunnel was controversial, particularly in France, with those opposing it claiming that it would effectively destroy the natural beauty of the Aspe Valley (Vallée d'Aspe), preferring full reopening of the Pau-Canfranc rail line. A group of protesters permanently squatted at the abandoned railway station near Cette-Eygun, at the foot of the pass on the French side. Among them was the charismatic Eric Pététin, who had waged a protracted legal campaign against the authorities, causing delay in the tunnel's construction.

By 1998 protesters were resorting to non-violent direct action, when construction was well under way. Their mascot was the rare Pyrenean Brown Bear, allegedly still to be found in the valley, but close to extinction, and alleged further threatened by the tunnel project. The last protesters were finally evicted in October 2005, some 20 years after campaigning against the tunnel had begun.

On 3 June 2003 French deputy Jean Lassalle interrupted the French National Assembly by singing the "love song" Se Canto, protesting against Minister of the Interior Nicolas Sarkozy's announcement of the moving of 23 gendarmes guarding the Somport Road Tunnel to the town of Oloron-Sainte-Marie from neighbouring Urdos, where Sarkozy commented that their wives had probably been "bored". Lassalle viewed this as offensive to the residents of Urdos.

In October 2020, Spain and France announced to investigate the reopening of the railway tunnel, co-financed by the European Union’s Connecting Europe Facility (CEF).

== Sports ==
There is a cross-country ski trail that goes 35 km around the pass, shared by Spain and France. Part of the route belongs to the Spanish ski resort of Candanchú.

== See also ==
- List of highest paved roads in Europe
- List of mountain passes
