= Ogeu-les-Bains station =

Railway station in Ogeu-les-Bains, France

Coordinates: 43°09′15″N 0°30′32″W

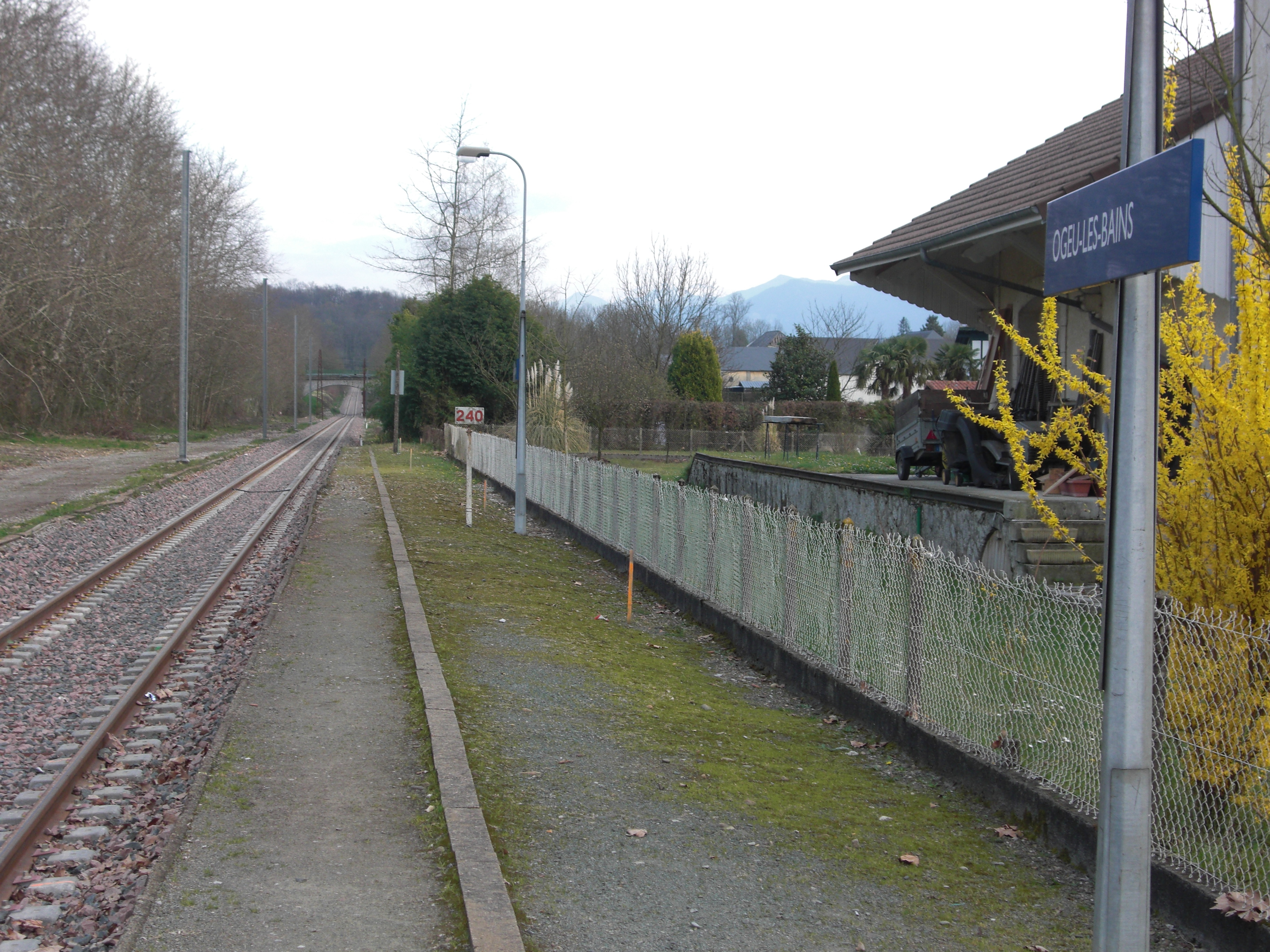
platform of the Ogeu-les-Bains station

Ogeu-les-Bains is a railway station in Ogeu-les-Bains, Nouvelle-Aquitaine, France. The station opened in 1883 and is located on the Pau–Canfranc railway. The station is served by TER (local) services operated by the SNCF.

== Train services ==
The following services currently call at Ogeu-les-Bains:

- local service (TER Nouvelle-Aquitaine) Pau - Oloron-Sainte-Marie - Bedous

Preceding station	TER Nouvelle-Aquitaine	Following station
Buzy-en-Béarn towards Pau	55	Oloron-Sainte-Marie towards Bedous
