= Buzy-en-Béarn station =

Railway station in Buzy, France

Coordinates: 43°08′53″N 0°27′21″W

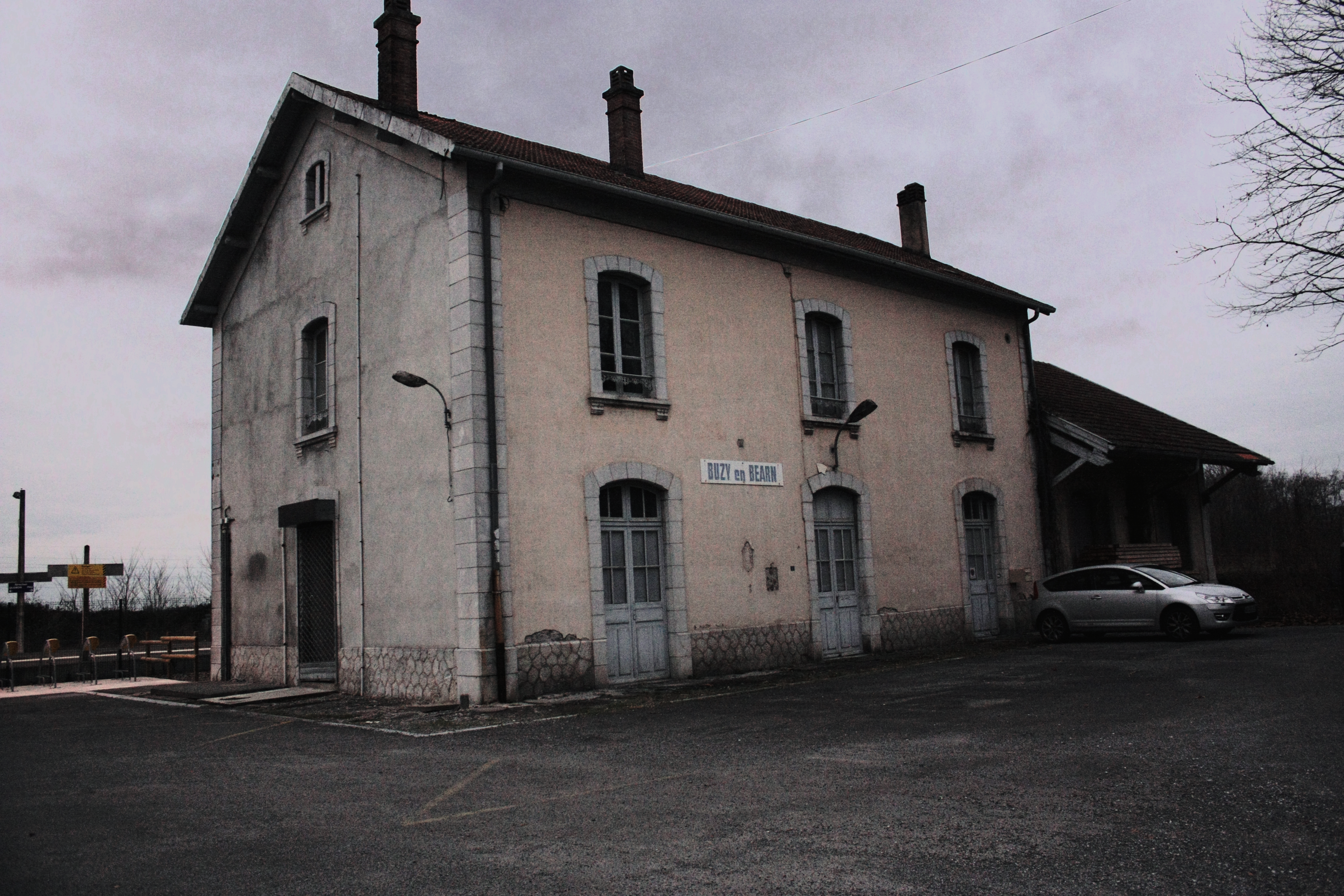
The station building at Buzy

Buzy-en-Béarn is a railway station in Buzy, Nouvelle-Aquitaine, France. The station opened in 1883 and is located on the Pau–Canfranc railway line. The station is served by TER (local) services operated by the SNCF. The station was also located on the Buzy - Laruns railway line which closed in 1969.

== Train services ==
The following services currently call at Buzy:

- local service (TER Nouvelle-Aquitaine) Pau - Oloron-Sainte-Marie - Bedous

Preceding station	TER Nouvelle-Aquitaine	Following station
Gan towards Pau	55	Ogeu-les-Bains towards Bedous
