= Oloron-Sainte-Marie station =

Railway station in Oloron-Sainte-Marie, France

Coordinates: 43°11′39″N 0°36′44″W

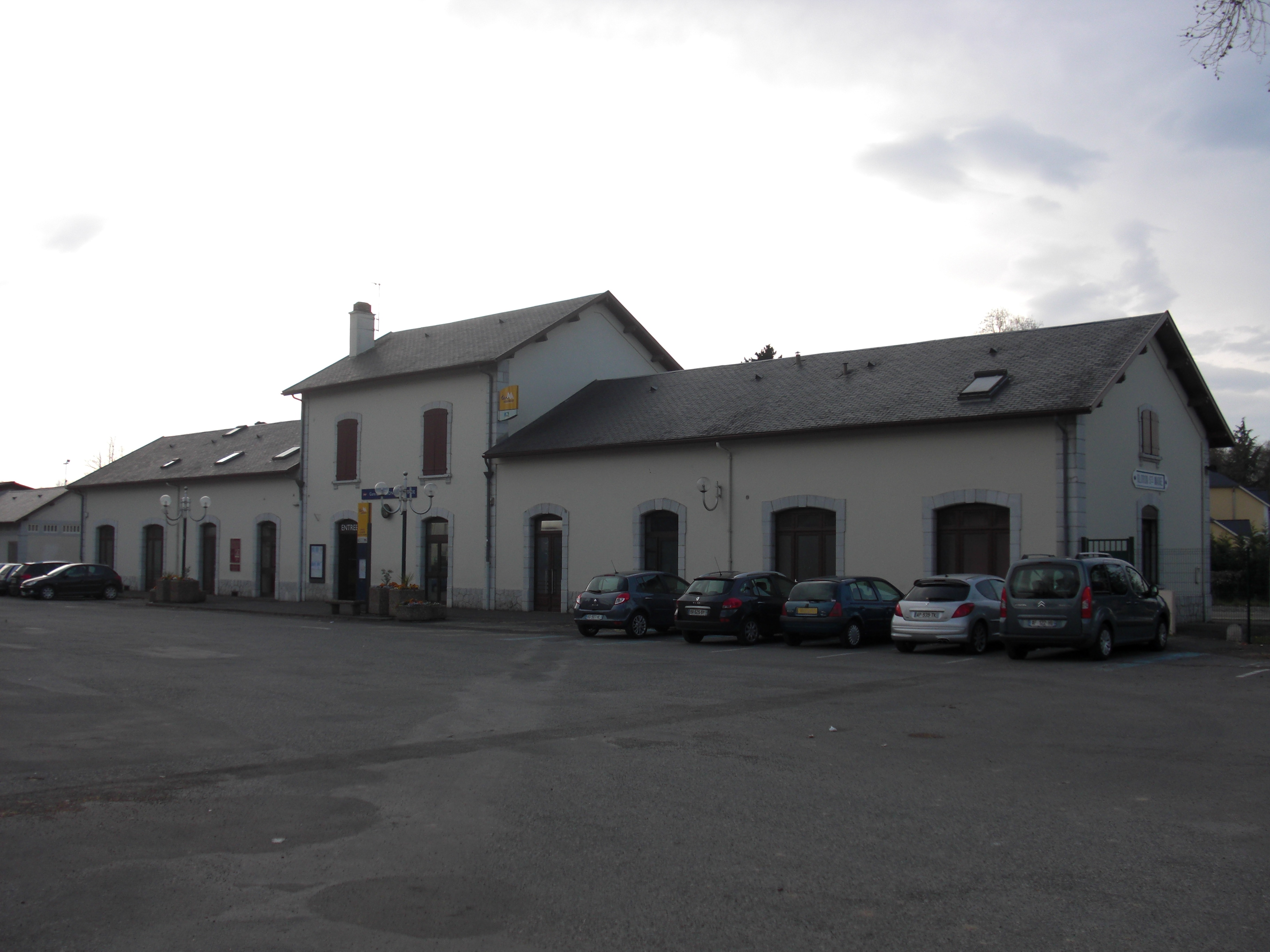
Oloron Sainte Marie station

Oloron-Sainte-Marie is a railway station in Oloron-Sainte-Marie, Nouvelle-Aquitaine, France. The station is on the Pau–Canfranc railway. Since 2016, the station is served by TER (local) services from Pau to Bedous operated by the SNCF.

== Train services ==
The following services currently call at Oloron-Sainte-Marie:

- local service (TER Nouvelle-Aquitaine) Pau - Bedous

Preceding station	TER Nouvelle-Aquitaine	Following station
Ogeu-les-Bains towards Pau	55	Bidos towards Bedous
