= Canfranc International railway station =

Railway station in Spain

Canfranc International Estación Internacional de Canfranc
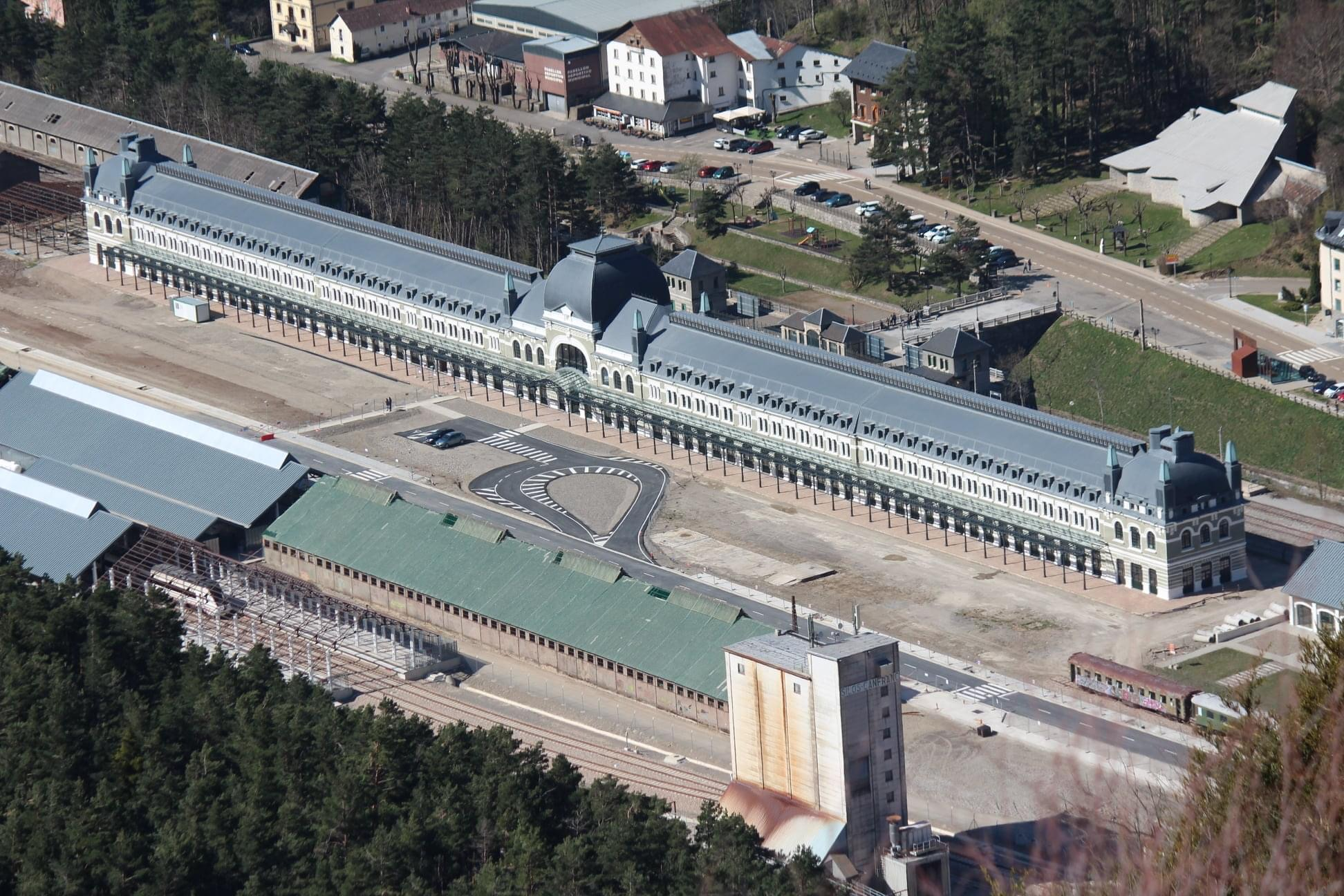
- After the renovation of the facade of the old and the opening of the new station in the former goods halls (foreground), April 2021.

General information
- Location: Avenida de Fernando El Católico, 2; 22880 Canfranc; Spain
- Coordinates: 42°45′05″N 00°30′51″W
- Elevation: 1,195 m (3,921 ft)
- System: Former and future border station
- Owner: Government of Aragon
- Operator: Adif
- Lines: (France) Pau to Canfranc; (Spain) Zaragoza to Canfranc
- Tracks: 3
- Train operators: : mid-distance to Zaragoza; Nouvelle-Aquitaine: rail replacement to Bedous connecting to Pau
- Bus operators: Local: from Jaca to the ski resorts

Construction
- Structure type: At-grade
- Architect: Fernando Ramírez de Dampierre

Other information
- Station code: 7174217
- Website: www.adif.es/w/74217-canfranc

History
- Opened: 18 July 1928
- Closed: (i.e. sold): 15 January 2013
- Rebuilt: 15 April 2021
- Electrified: 1500 V = : French side only; 25 kV, 50 Hz ~ : planned for 2040
Location

Canfranc International railway station (Spanish: Estación Internacional de Canfranc) is a formerly international railway station in the village of Canfranc in the Spanish Pyrenees. The Somport railway tunnel, inoperative since 1970, which carries the Pau–Canfranc railway, under the Pyrenees into France, is located at its northern end.

The station, which was opened during July 1928, was constructed on a grand scale to serve as a major hub for cross-border railway traffic. Already more modest than imagined, this came to a full and abrupt end during 1970 following a train derailment that damaged a key bridge in France.

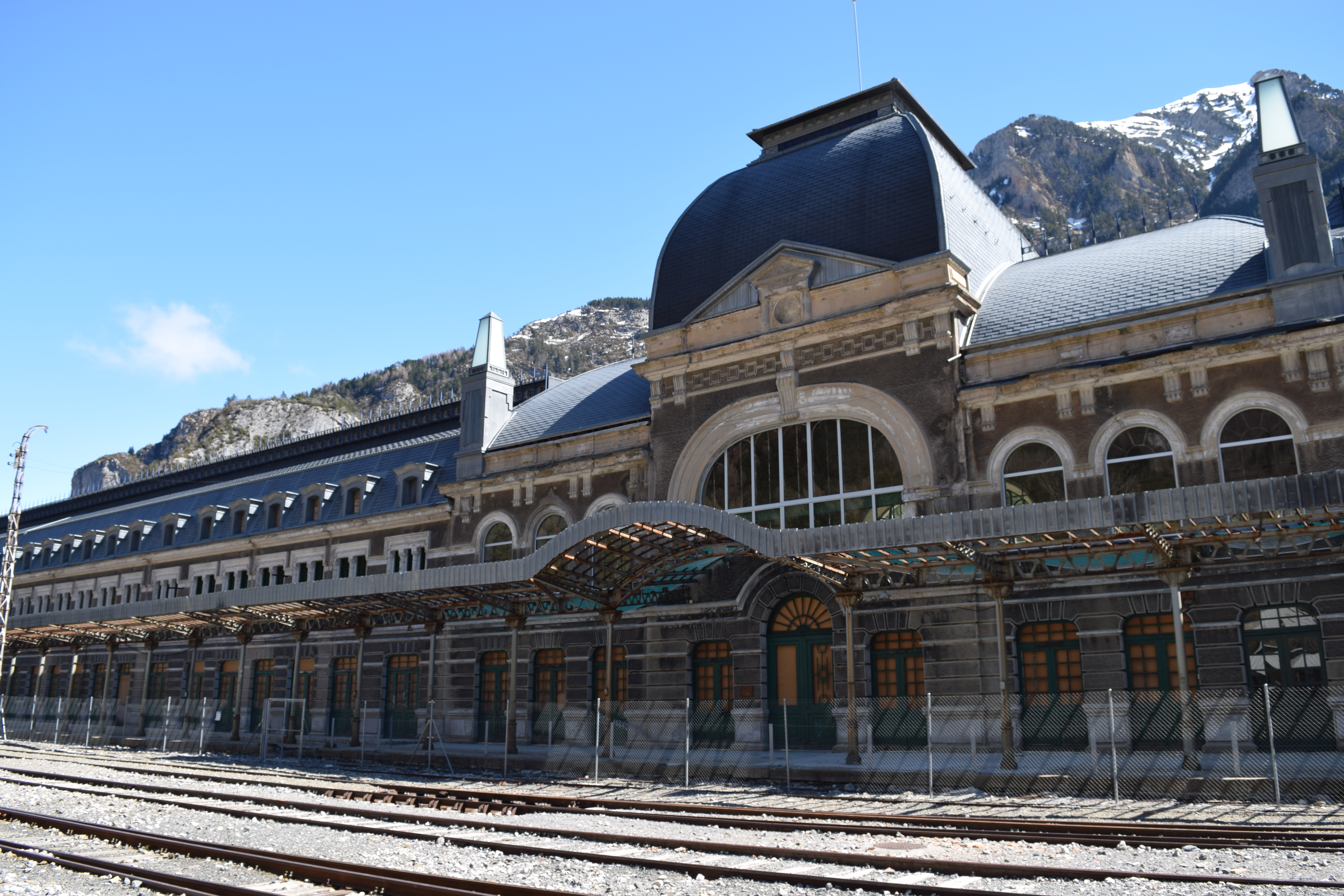
The station building in July 2015

With only minimal services over five decades, Canfranc station experienced a major decline and neglect, resulting in much of the site becoming derelict. The regional government has ambitions to reopen the international line and has redeveloped the station, which meant the renovation of the existing station building for use as a hotel and its replacement by a new facility in the former freight area. In February 2020, funding for both the relaunch of international services and the station's rehabilitation was made available by the European Union.

== History ==
=== Origins ===
During the nineteenth century, two major border crossings were established between France and Spain. However, even prior to the start of the twentieth century, there was consistently insufficient capacity to accommodate demand for cross-border traffic, and a third border crossing would be needed. At one point, the cost of constructing such a crossing was estimated at 3.2 million pesetas (roughly equivalent of €20,000 at the time), in addition to in excess of 1.2 million pesetas for supporting infrastructure such as access points, docks and other facilities.

According to railway historian Alfonso Marco, Spanish officials wanted a railway to be provisioned with as grand a station that would demonstrate the nation's engineering prowess. Thus, when the project got underway, it was decided the facility would be built at Los Arañones, situated in a relatively undeveloped valley near the village of Canfranc. The practicality of building a grandiose station would require French and Spanish railway operators to share the facility, rather than two separate stations, positioning Canfranc as the prominent hub for the route, greatly shaping the station's design and scale. Concretely, the main building incorporates elaborate Beaux-Arts architecture, featuring 365 windows and 156 doors, along a length of 240 m (790 ft).

On 12 July 1912, construction work commenced on the Somport railway tunnel from the French side; it would be completed in 1915, the work having been delayed by the outbreak of First World War. Construction of the station itself did not begin until 1923, headed by the Spanish project engineer Fernando Ramírez de Dampierre. It was formally opened on 18 July 1928, in the presence of King Alfonso XIII of Spain and the president of the French Republic Gaston Doumergue.

Upon its opening, the station became the second-largest in Europe (after Leipzig Hauptbahnhof). According to railway historian Francisco Polo Muriel of the Museo del Ferrocarril (Railway Museum) in Madrid, "[i]t featured a splendid international hotel, a quarantine facility, and with its palatial size and design, it was equipped with housing, administrative offices, customs and commercial facilities, and railway operations spaces for both countries."

In 1944 there was a fire that destroyed 117 of the 132 houses in Canfranc. The fire forced the people of Canfranc to move to Los Arañones, causing Los Arañones to be renamed Canfranc.

=== Operational years ===
Roughly three years following its grand opening, Canfranc International railway station suffered a major fire. The fire started in the lobby, the blaze spread throughout adjacent areas, causing an estimated 500,000 pesetas in damages overall. After this event, numerous officials lost their optimism in the value of the station. During the Spanish Civil War, Nationalist leader Francisco Franco ordered the tunnels on the Spanish side sealed, allegedly to prevent arms smuggling. However, as a consequence of the Franco-Spanish international convention under which it was built, the station itself remained open.

During the Second World War, the station and the surrounding area acquired a reputation as the "Casablanca in the Pyrenees" due to its serving as a key crossing point for goods, as well as being a center of espionage for Nazi and Spanish authorities. Officially neutral Spain had formed an operational agreement with the Wehrmacht, which saw freight trains carrying mined tungsten northwards while French grain, as well as trans-shipped Swiss gold, was borne southwards. Passenger services also continued during the conflict, which provided an escape route into Spain for both Jews and Allied soldiers alike. Aware of these movements, Nazi agents frequently sought to intervene against passengers of interest.

Following the end of the war, railway traffic promptly returned to normal levels. The relative stability experienced during the 1950s and 1960s brought about a period of prosperity, but this soon proved to be rather short-lived. In the 1960s, the future of both the station and the Pau-Canfranc railway became increasingly threatened, and they were chronically underfunded, leading to frequent incidents that eventually raised safety concerns. The station is often said to have been used in the filming of Doctor Zhivago (1965), but although the film was shot largely in Spain, there is no evidence that Canfranc was a filming location.

The station's principal purpose of operation came to an abrupt halt on 20 March 1970, when a train derailment on the Pau-Canfranc railway line demolished the L'Estanguet bridge on the French side of the Pyrénées Mountains.

Abandoned French track field in 1994

Under financial pressure from its national railway company SNCF, the French government decided not to rebuild the bridge, which effectively forced the closure of the cross-border line. Despite this, the station remained open, served by just two daily Spanish trains and a handful of rail replacement buses from the French side. As a consequence of the through route's abrupt termination, the population of the village declined sharply over the following years.

=== Deterioration ===
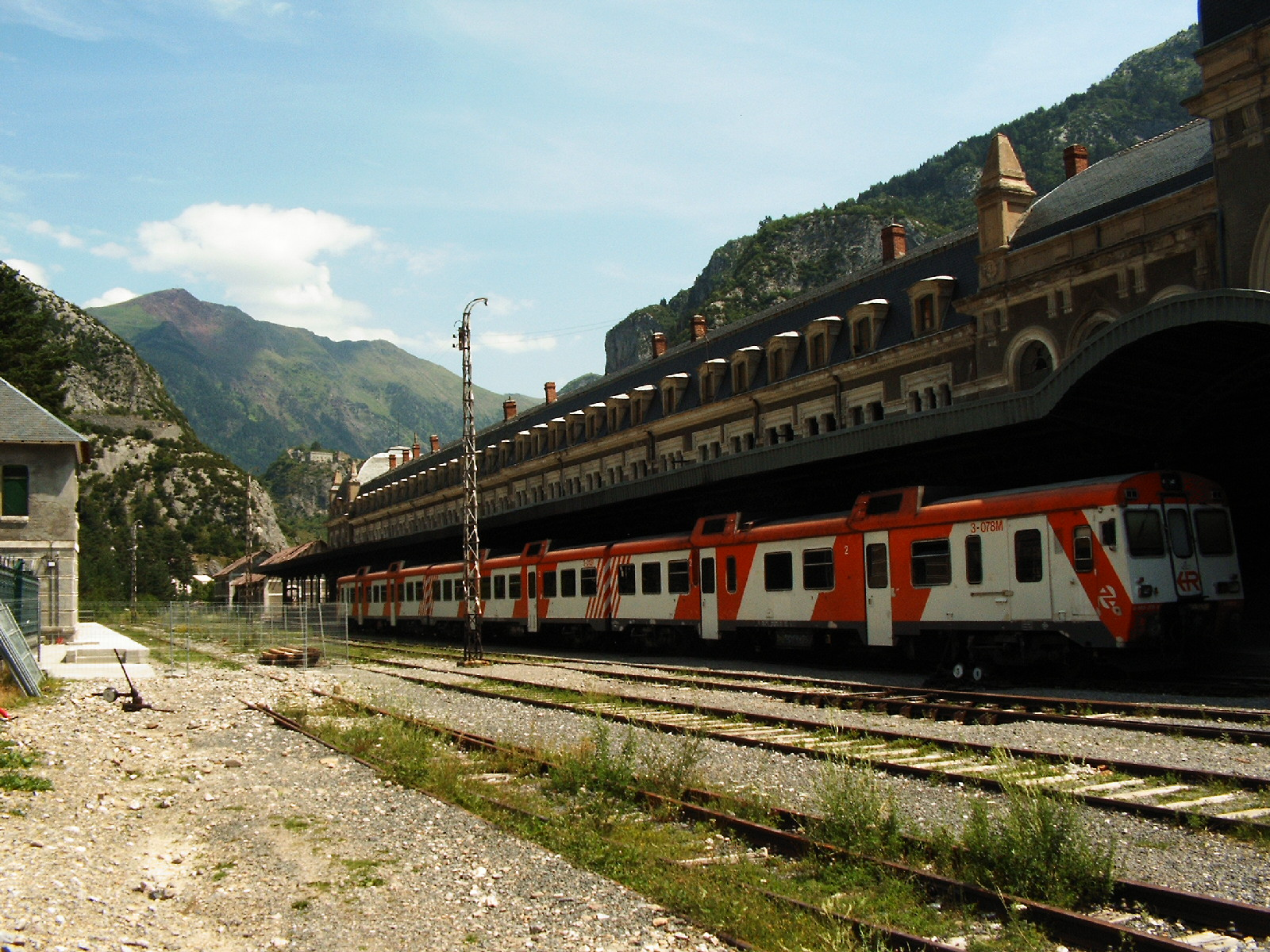
Spanish train services to Zaragoza from Canfranc, 2006

Since the closure of the through route, much of the station and its facilities were neglected and became inoperative. Large portions of the site were overgrown, but the majority of the buildings remained largely intact and could be entered. The main building was re-roofed, but otherwise remained in a state of disrepair, and was fenced off and remained closed to the general public outside of guided tours, which were first only offered during July and August. Between 2013 and 2017, approximately 120,000 people, mostly Spaniards, toured the station, a greater number than had used the station when it was in service.

During the 2010s, the railway station, using its more modest facilities, has been open for the twice daily passenger trains to and from Zaragoza–Delicias railway station, plus the occasional freight train to the grain silo. During 2007, the station was declared to be a Site of Cultural Interest.

== Renovation ==
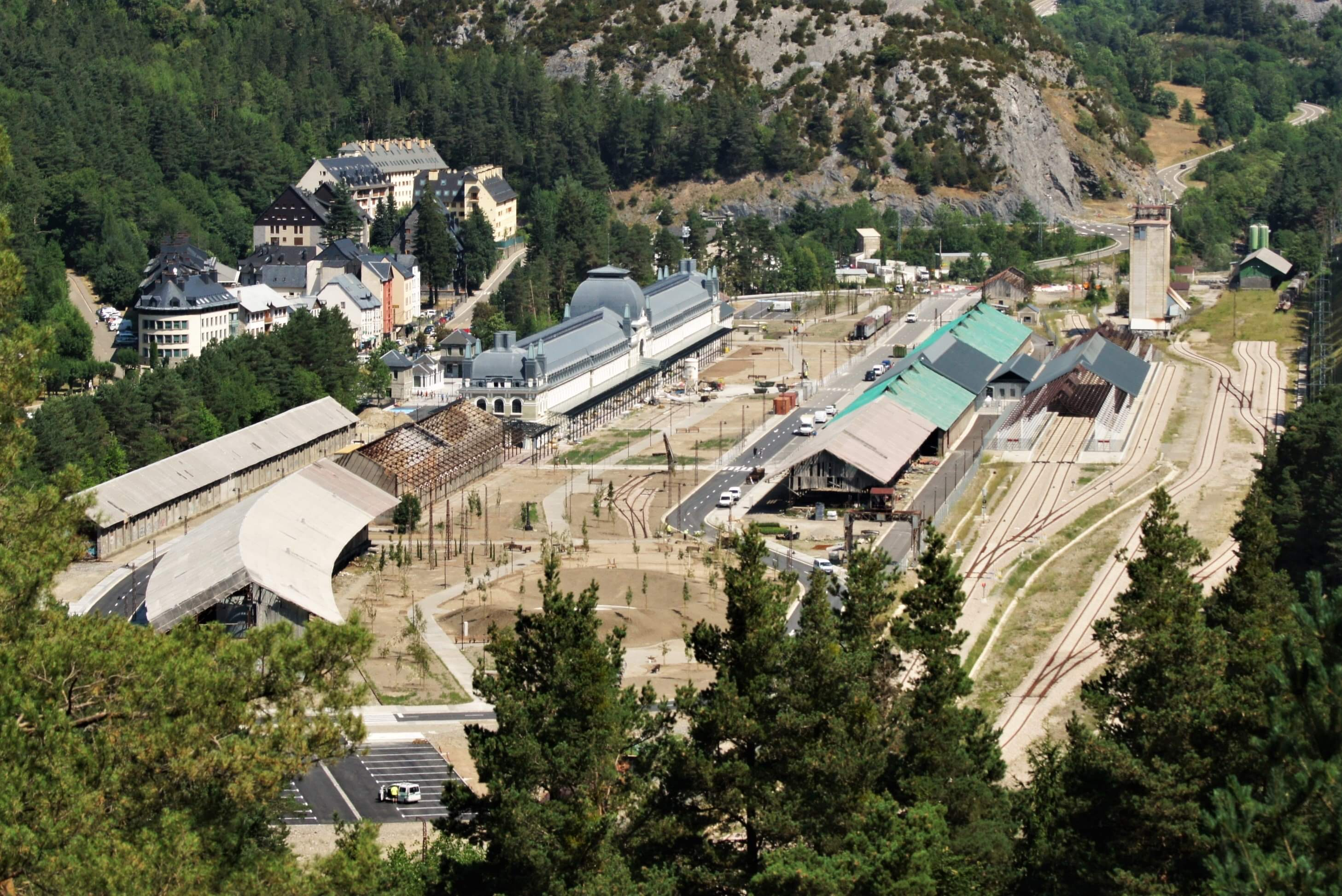
The former French track field being converted into a park, August 2022

The government of Aragon, owner of the station since 2013, long held various ambitions for the rehabilitation of the station. Plans were mooted to redevelop the main station building into a hotel, which would involve the construction of a new station in the former freight halls to replace it. There have been explorations of options to reopen the through line as the "western trans-Pyrenean line"; this initiative would reportedly involve the assistance of the government of Aquitaine, the adjacent French region. In February 2020, it was announced that funding from the European Union had been made available for the purpose of reopening the through line and relaunching international services.

As of 2018, architects Joaquín Magrazó and Fernando Used, in conjunction with the government of Aragon and the Barceló Hotel Group, were preparing designs to transform the station building into a hotel. As announced, the new station building was built behind the existing one, with its entry via the hotel vestibule. In 2020 the exterior of the old station was renovated and the interior was reinforced. The tracks around the old station were removed and the area turned into roads and parks. For the buildings and their site were also proposed a 200-seat conference centre, a branch of the regional railway museum, shops, and a pilgrim refuge, as Canfranc is on one of the routes to Santiago de Compostela.

== Description ==
Canfranc International railway station was often referred to around the time of its opening as the "Titanic of the Mountains", in part due to its large size, having the second largest station building in Europe at the time of its completion. Architecturally, it was deliberately designed with prominent symbolism: the exterior features an eclectic Beaux-Arts style that was reportedly inspired by French palatial architecture, while the interior was adorned with elements drawn from classical Roman architecture. Large quantities of glass, cement and iron are present throughout the structure, which is adorned with 365 individual windows.

Part of the station was considered to be French territory; a school was established in the village for the children of its French staff.

The station's platforms had a length of 200 m (220 yd). Extensive infrastructure was present to service and transfer transiting passengers, baggage and freight between Spanish and French trains, because the French rail standard gauge of 1,435 mm (4 ft 8 1/2 in) was incompatible with the Spanish gauge of 1,668 mm (5 ft 5 21/32 in) at the time, and hence prevented through traffic. This gauge complication transformed a routine customs-control exercise into a lengthy logistics exercise.

The site includes a large Spanish steam locomotive depot, two sheds for the transshipment of freight between French and Spanish trains (now the new station), various other outbuildings and a resultant extensive layout of tracks. There is also an array of underground passages running across the site, some of which remain accessible. As of 2025, much of the infrastructure surrounding the station, including grain silos and warehouses, was derelict.

== See also ==
- Canfranc Underground Laboratory

== Bibliography ==
- Dieter Hamblock (2010). "Tristesse in den Pyrenäen" [Sadness in the Pyrenees]. Eisenbahngeschichte (in German). 40: 60–67.
- Alexander Kierdorf (2010). "'Es gibt keine Pyrenäen mehr' – Der Palastbahnhof im spanischen Canfranc" ['There are no more Pyrenees' — The Palace Station in Spanish Canfranc]. Industrie-Kultur (in German). 50 (1): 14–15.
