= Chemin de la Mâture =

Path in the French Pyrenees mountains

Coordinates: 42°53′17.7″N 0°33′38″W

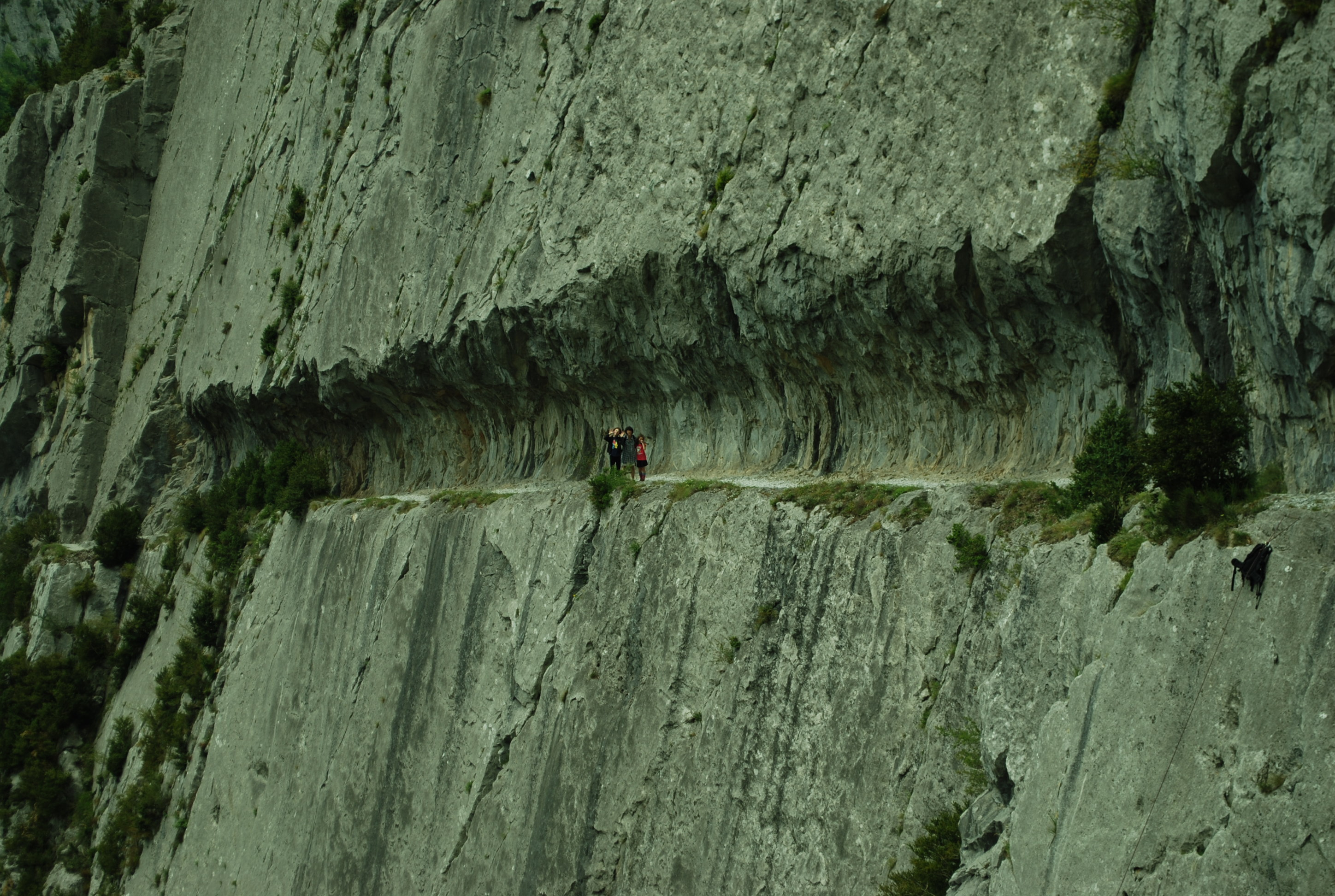
Three people on the Chemin de la Mâture

Located in the French Pyrenees mountains, the Chemin de la Mâture is a 1,200-metre (3,900 ft) path cut into a sheer rock face rising over 200 metres (660 ft) above the river Gave d'Aspe. Completed by the engineer Paul-Marie Leroy in 1772, the Chemin de la Mâture (literally "The Mast Road") was originally created to transport timber from the nearby Pacq forest to be used in constructing masts for French naval vessels. The path has since been incorporated into the GR 10, a long-distance footpath running along the Pyrenees from the Atlantic Ocean to the Mediterranean Sea.

The Chemin de la Mâture overlooks the Fort du Portalet and lies near the village of Etsaut, in the department of Pyrénées-Atlantiques. The area is popular for rock climbing.

== Notes ==
- Translated in part from the article of the same name on French Wikipedia
