= Canfranc =

Municipality in Aragon, Spain

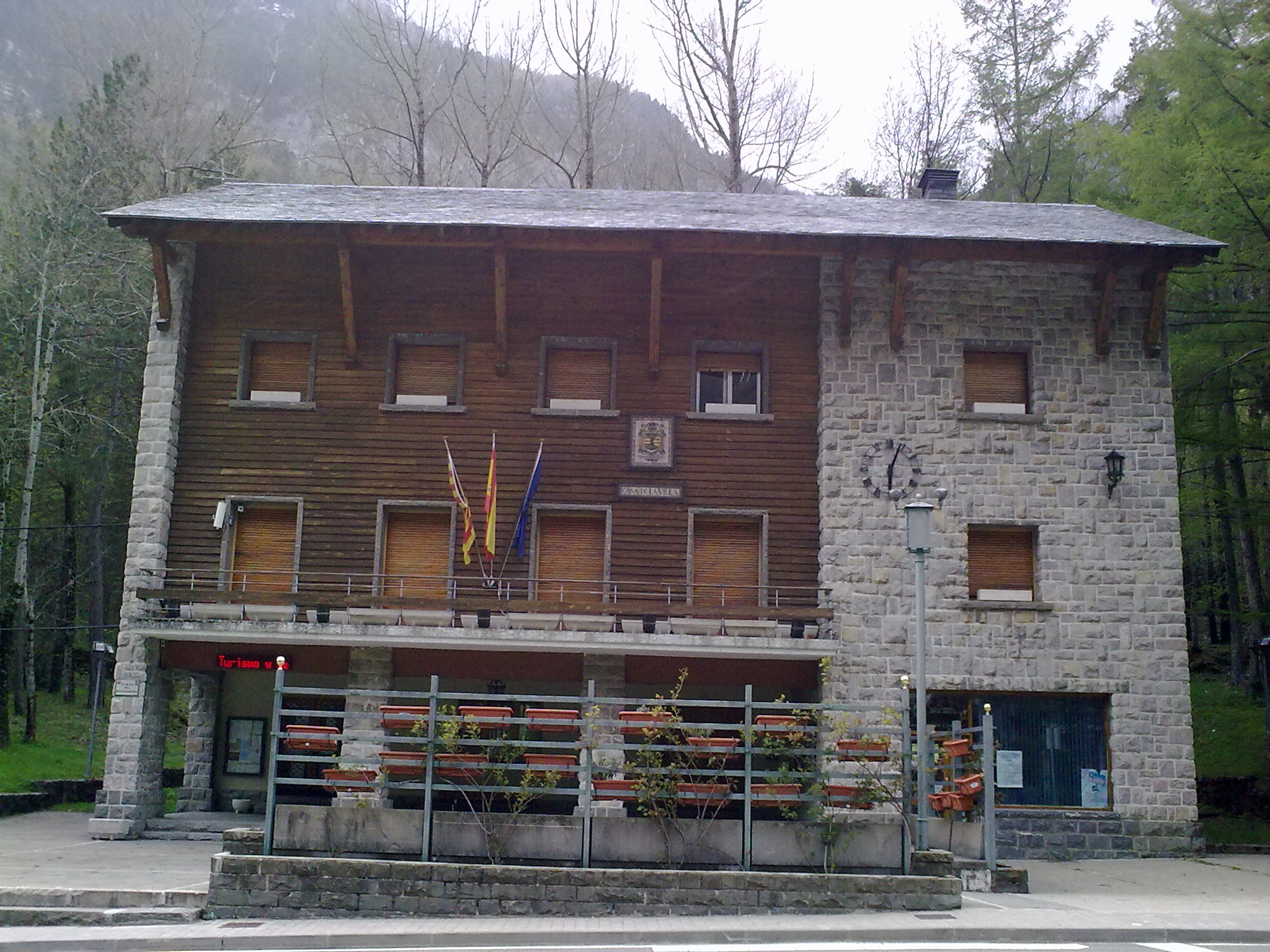
- Canfranc town hall

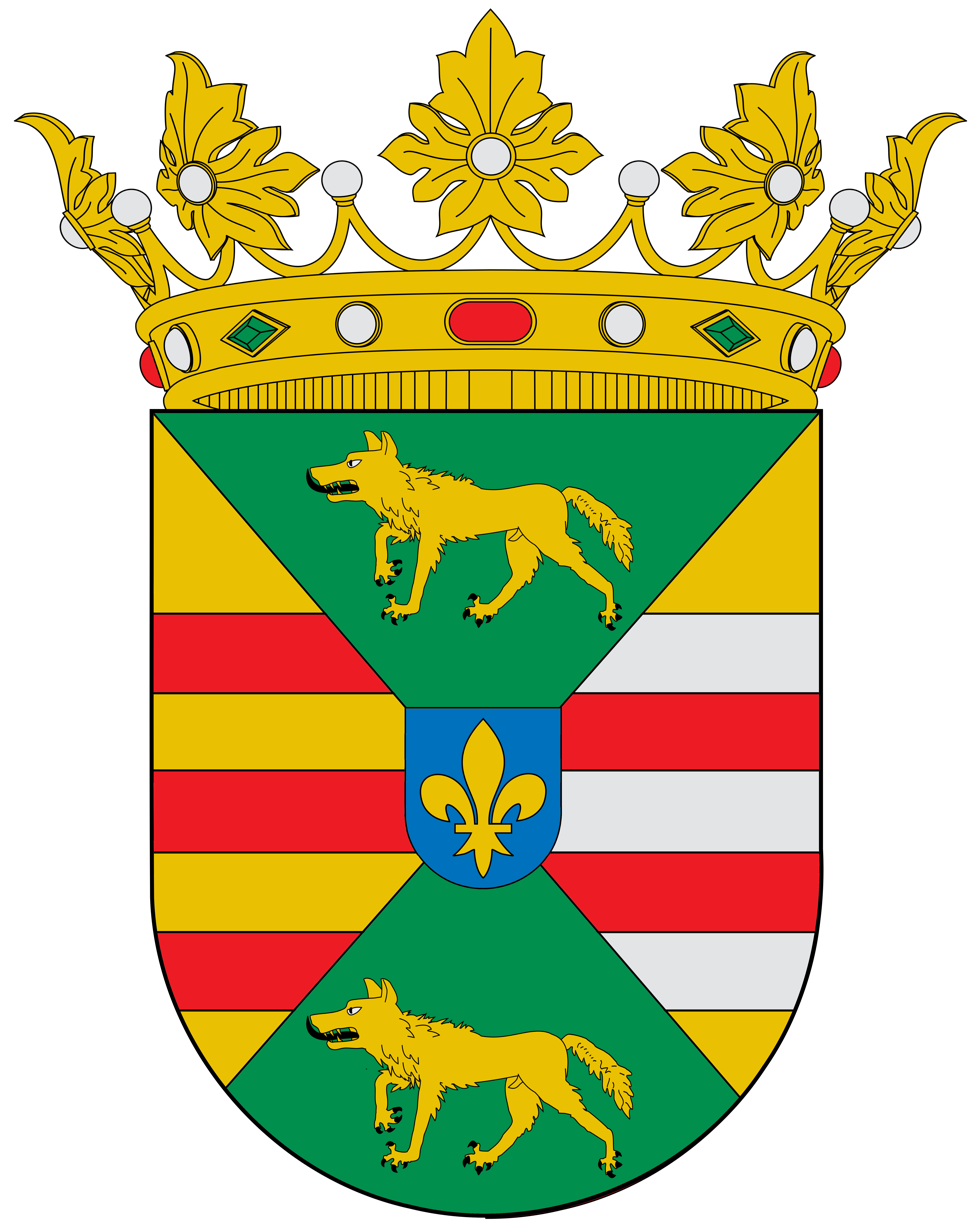
- Coat of arms

- Location of Canfranc in Aragon
- Coordinates: 42°42.93′N 0°31.53′W
- Country: Spain
- Autonomous community: Aragon
- Province: Huesca
- Comarca: La Jacetania

Government
  - Mayor: Fernando Sánchez Morales
- Elevation: 1,040 m (3,410 ft)

Population (2025-01-01)
  - Total: 633
- Time zone: UTC+1 (CET)
  - Summer (DST): UTC+2 (CEST)

Canfranc (Spanish pronunciation: [kaɱˈfɾaŋk]) is a municipality in the Aragón Valley of north-eastern Spain consisting of two villages, the original village and Canfranc Estación, which developed with the establishment of Canfranc International railway station to serve railway traffic across the Pyrenees.

== Political information ==
- comarca of Jacetania (capital at Jaca)
- province of Huesca
- autonomous community of Aragón

== Canfranc village ==
The name of the village is from Campus Franci, literally the field of the Franks. It was originally a small market village, as well as providing pilgrims on the Arles route of the Way of St. James their first respite after the difficult crossing of the Pyrenees over the pass of Somport.

It was founded between 1080 and 1090 by Sancho Ramírez, King of Aragón. Canfranc was also a command post, protecting the borders and controlling taxes, which were donated to the Cathedral of Jaca.

On 29 October 1288, the Treaty of Canfranc mediated by Edward I of England was signed here, providing for the release of Charles II of Naples from his imprisonment by Peter III of Aragon.

The village, which lies in the valley of the Aragón River, covers an area of 71.6 km^{2} (27.6 sq mi) and is situated at an altitude of 1,040 m (3,410 ft). The remains to be seen include a Romanesque pilgrim's bridge and two churches of interest: Nuestra Señora de la Asunción (12th to 16th centuries) with four baroque retablos, and La Trinidad (16th century). The town was obliterated by fire in 1617 and again in 1944, after which the villagers for the most part moved to nearby Canfranc Station. The current population is 77.

== Canfranc station ==
Abandoned site of the Canfranc International railway station in 1994

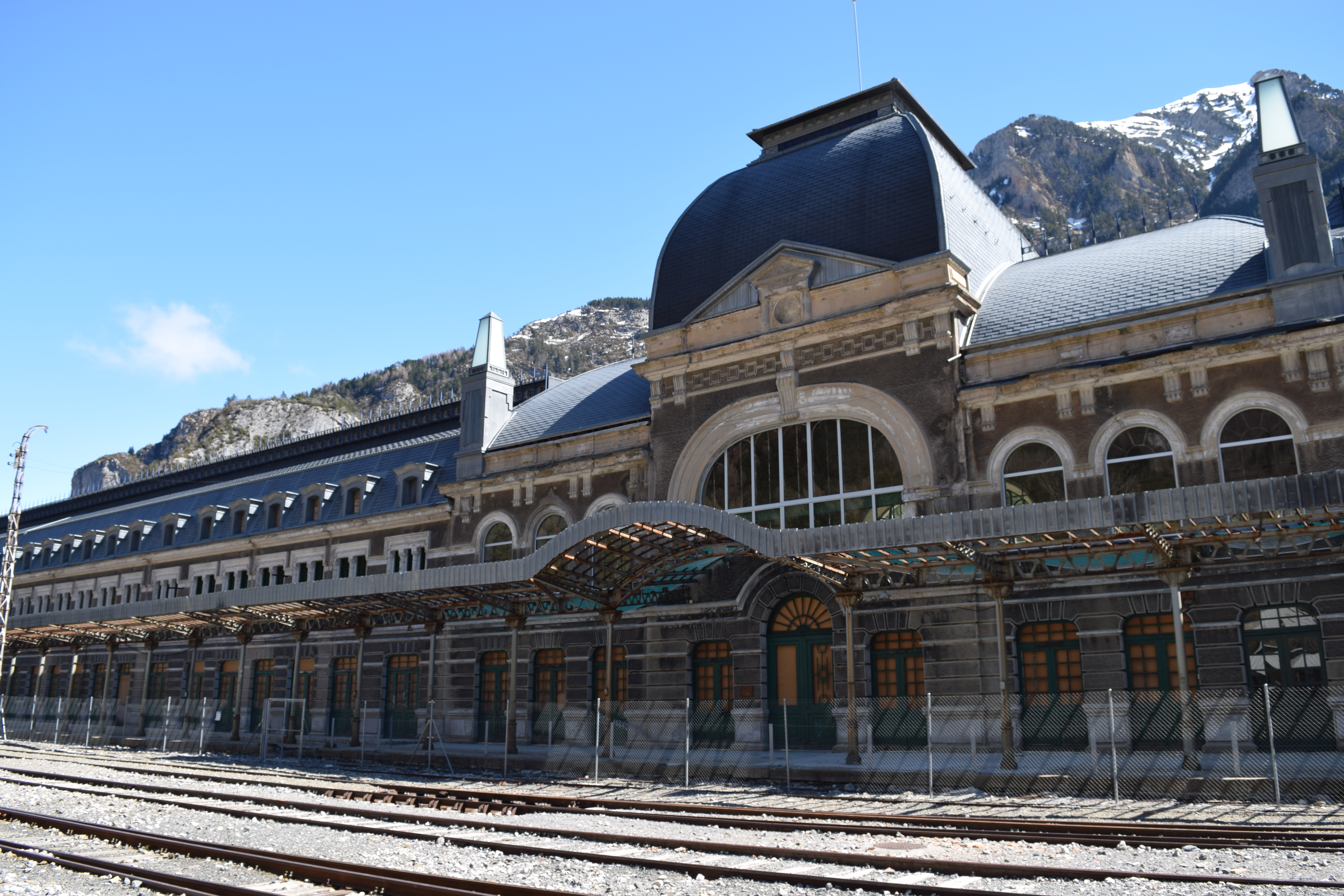
International station in 2015

The village of Canfranc Estación (altitude 1190 m; population 454) was largely created due to the inauguration on 18 July 1928 of the Pau–Canfranc railway crossing the Pyrenees, and is best known for its huge abandoned railway station, built for transfers between Spanish and French trains, which used different railway gauges. The line was closed after an accident on 27 March 1970 destroyed the bridge at L'Estanguet, and the French side of the station was abandoned and fell into disrepair. (Note: The area where the bridge stood is Saillet et Esquit, Lées-Athas. The railway passed over the Gave d'Aspe and the E-7 now crosses the remains of the trackbed, which can be traced north and south.)

There are rumours of "German gold" arriving here during World War II. Also, British espionage smuggled information and people from Vichy France.

Two trains a day now run between Canfranc and Zaragoza, and since 2010 the Spanish and French regional and national governments have discussed reopening the line to international traffic; as of July 2016 this was planned for 2020.

The abandoned railway's Somport Tunnel (7874 m) is now used as an emergency lane for the motorway's Somport Tunnel (8602 m) and is also used by the Canfranc Underground Laboratory.

== Principal festivities ==
Canfranc-Pueblo celebrates the Assumption of Mary (its Patron saint) on 15 August, while Canfranc Station holds festivities on the anniversary of the inauguration of its train station, 18 July.

== Twin towns ==
Canfranc is twinned with:

- La Concordia, Jinotega, Nicaragua
- Aspen, Colorado, United States
- Zaragoza, Aragon, Spain

== See also ==
- List of municipalities in Huesca

== Notes ==
Preceded by Somport	The Aragonese Way of the Way of St. James	Succeeded by Villanúa
