= Ogeu-les-Bains =

- Commune
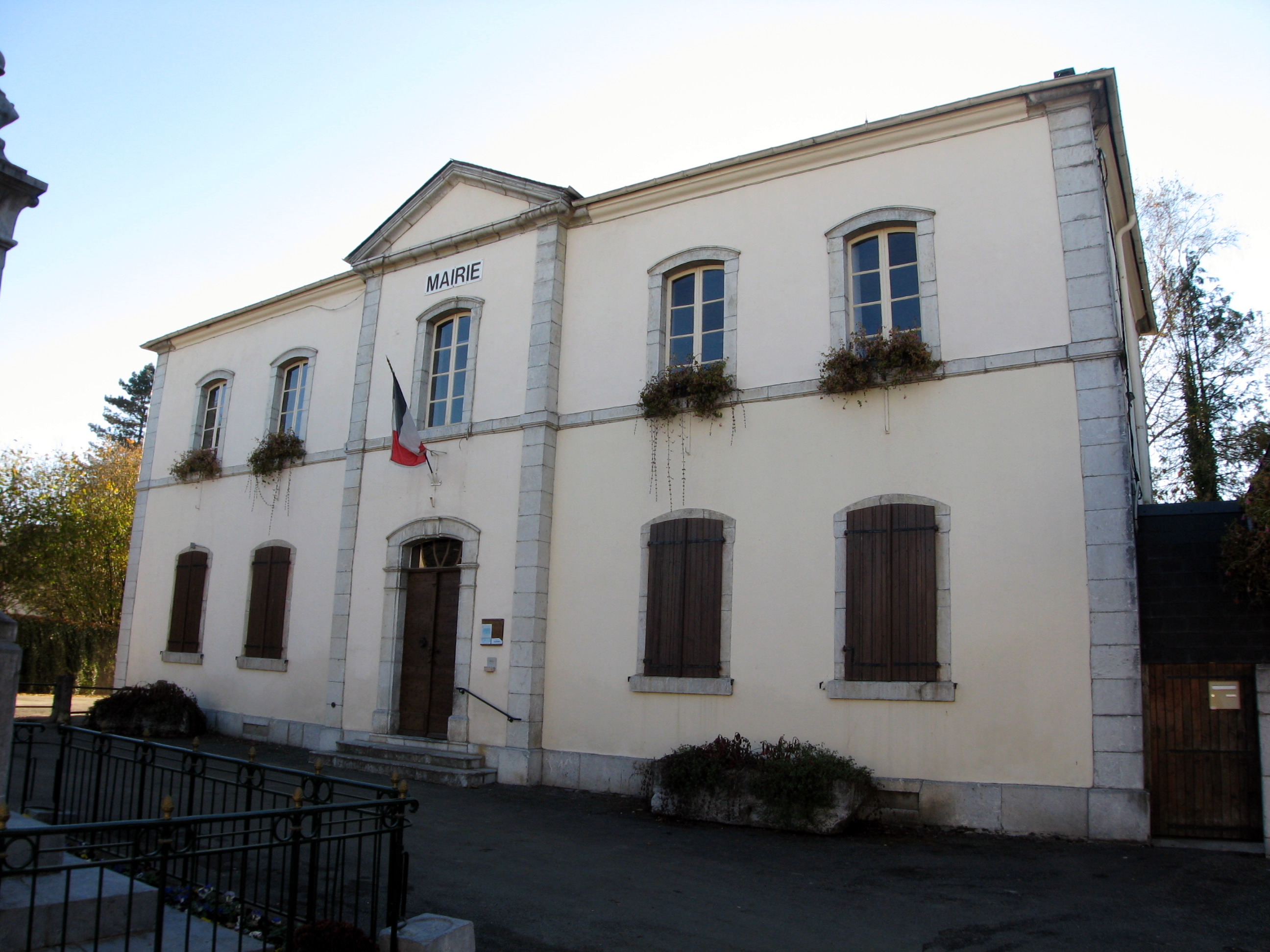
- The town hall of Ogeu-les-Bains
- Location of Ogeu-les-Bains
- Location within France Location within Nouvelle-Aquitaine
- Coordinates: 43°08′54″N 0°30′12″W
- Country: France
- Region: Nouvelle-Aquitaine
- Department: Pyrénées-Atlantiques
- Arrondissement: Oloron-Sainte-Marie
- Canton: Oloron-Sainte-Marie-2
- Intercommunality: Haut Béarn

Government
  - Mayor (2020–2026): Marc Oxibar
- Area^{1}: 23.07 km^{2} (8.91 sq mi)
- Elevation: 351 m (1,152 ft)
- Highest elevation: 440 m (1,440 ft)
- Lowest elevation: 256 m (840 ft)
- Population (2023): 1,290
  - Density: 55.9/km^{2} (145/sq mi)
- Time zone: UTC+01:00 (CET)
  - Summer (DST): UTC+02:00 (CEST)
- INSEE/Postal code: 64421 /64680
- ^{1} French Land Register data, which excludes lakes, ponds, glaciers > 1 km^{2} (0.386 sq mi or 247 acres) and river estuaries.

Ogeu-les-Bains (French pronunciation: [ɔʒø le bɛ̃]; Occitan: Augeu) is a commune in the Pyrénées-Atlantiques department in south-western France. Ogeu-les-Bains station has rail connections to Pau, Oloron-Sainte-Marie and Bedous.

== See also ==
- Communes of the Pyrénées-Atlantiques department
