= Buzy, Pyrénées-Atlantiques =

Buzy
- Commune
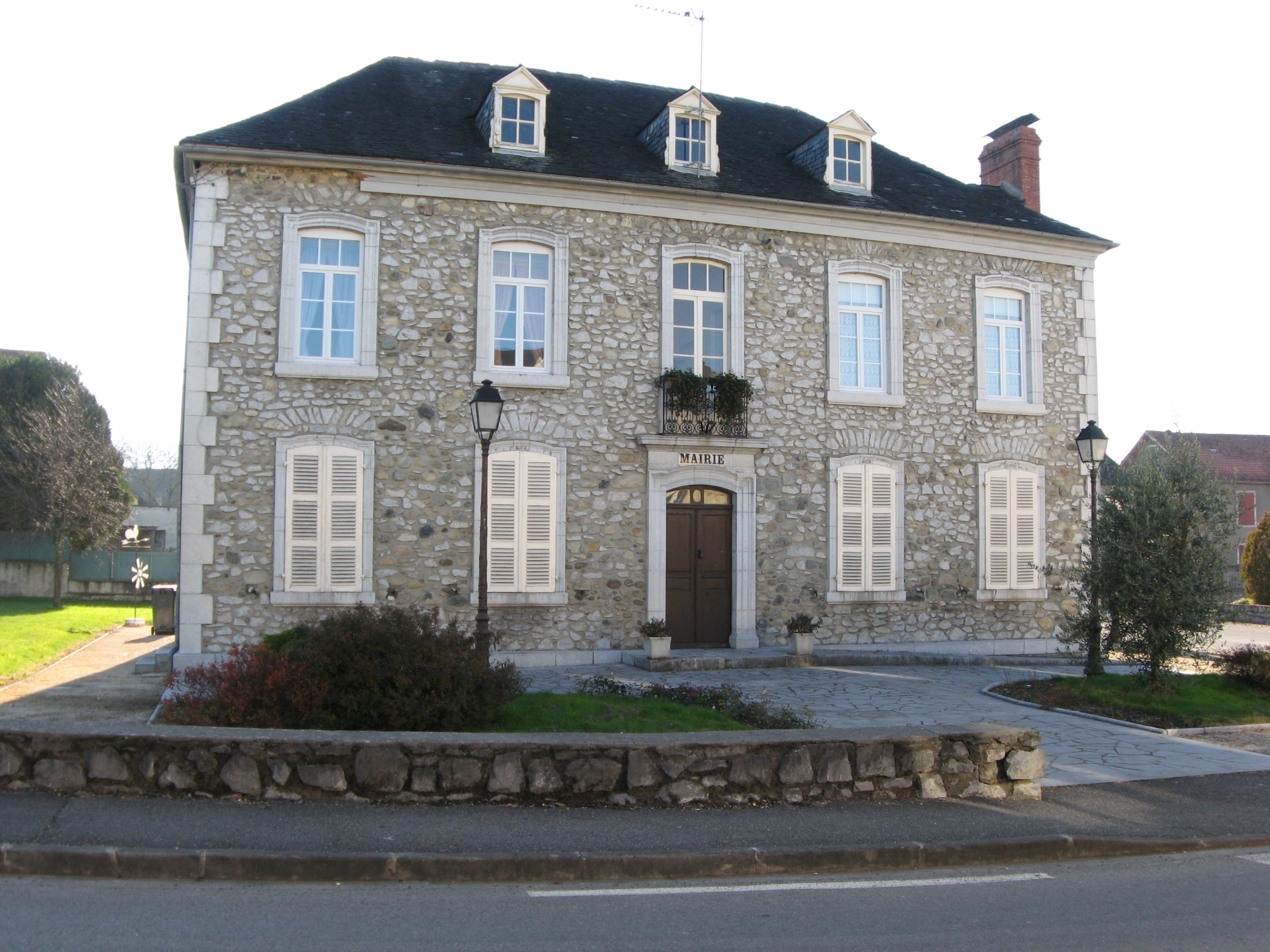
- Town hall
- Location of Buzy
- Location within France Location within Nouvelle-Aquitaine
- Coordinates: 43°08′05″N 0°27′28″W
- Country: France
- Region: Nouvelle-Aquitaine
- Department: Pyrénées-Atlantiques
- Arrondissement: Oloron-Sainte-Marie
- Canton: Oloron-Sainte-Marie-2
- Intercommunality: Vallée d'Ossau

Government
  - Mayor (2020–2026): Fernand Martin
- Area^{1}: 16.70 km^{2} (6.45 sq mi)
- Elevation: 426 m (1,398 ft)
- Highest elevation: 561 m (1,841 ft)
- Lowest elevation: 296 m (971 ft)
- Population (2023): 1,006
  - Density: 60.24/km^{2} (156.0/sq mi)
- Time zone: UTC+01:00 (CET)
  - Summer (DST): UTC+02:00 (CEST)
- INSEE/Postal code: 64157 /64260
- ^{1} French Land Register data, which excludes lakes, ponds, glaciers > 1 km^{2} (0.386 sq mi or 247 acres) and river estuaries.

Buzy (French pronunciation: [byzi]; Occitan: Busi) is a commune in the Pyrénées-Atlantiques department in southwestern France. Buzy-en-Béarn station has rail connections to Pau, Oloron-Sainte-Marie and Bedous.

== See also ==
- Ossau Valley
- Communes of the Pyrénées-Atlantiques department
