= Fort du Portalet =

Fort in the French Pyrenees

Coordinates: 42°53′11″N 0°33′46″W

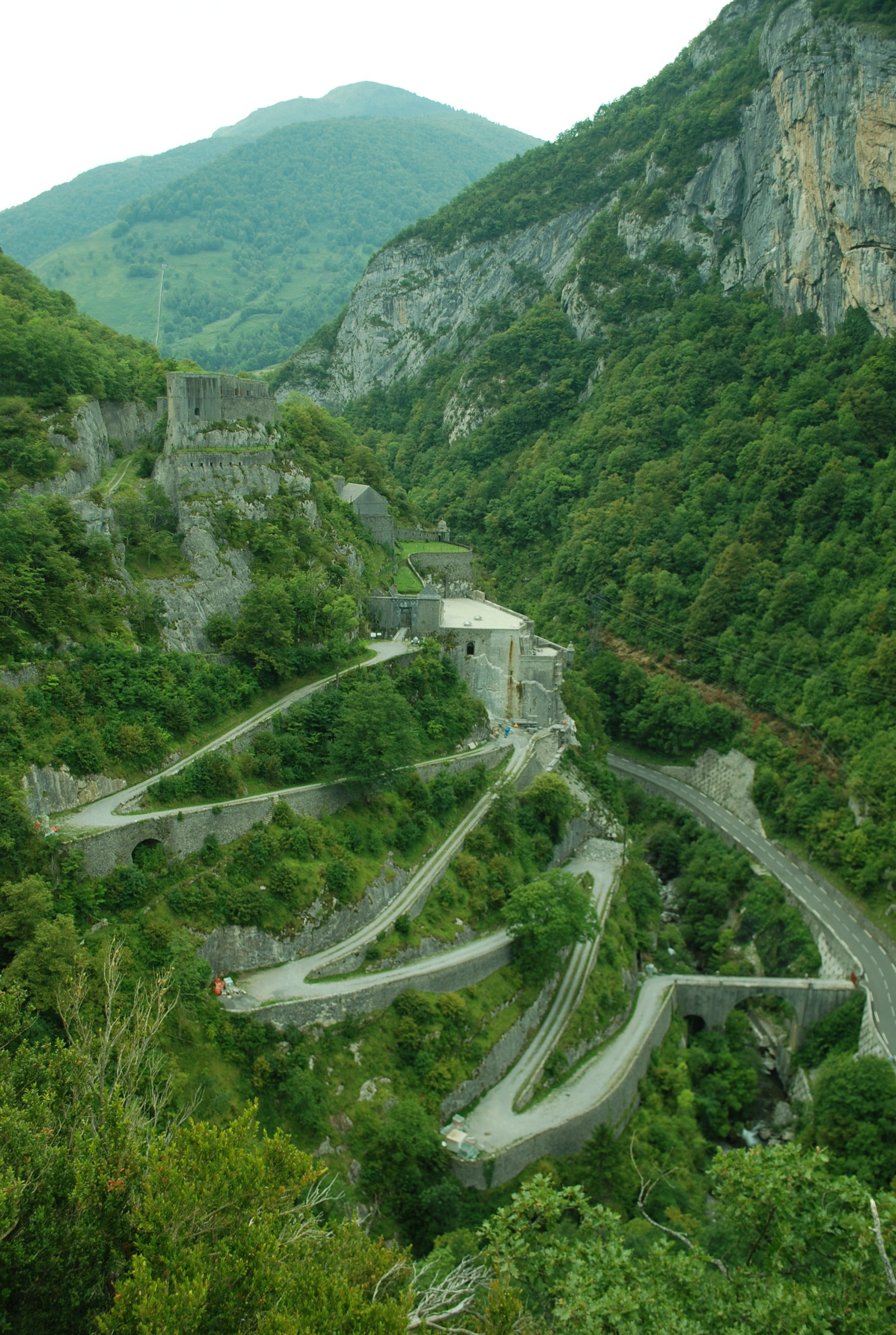
Viewed from the Chemin de la Mâture

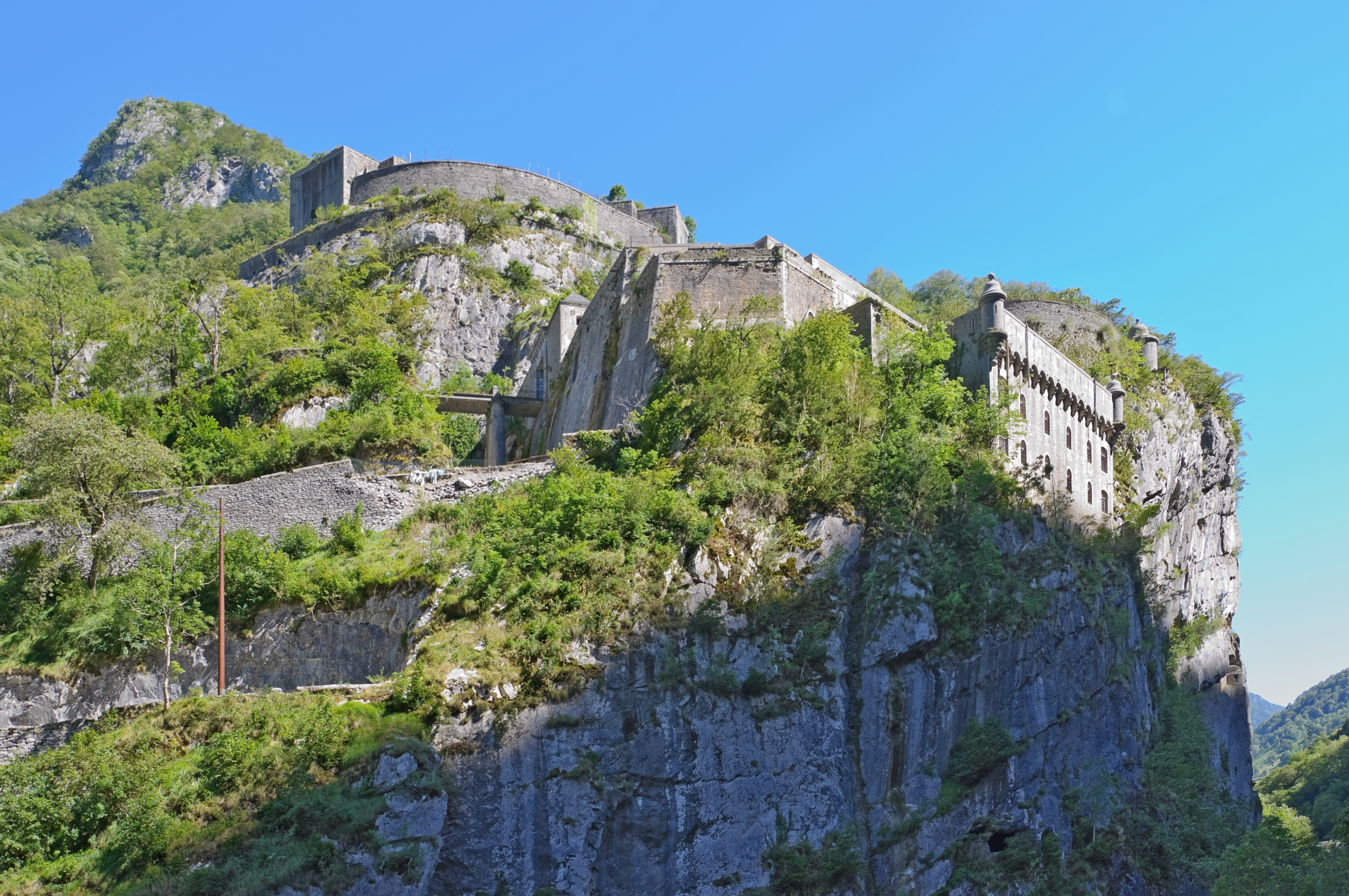

The Fort du Portalet is a fort in the Aspe Valley in Bearn, French Pyrenees, built from 1842 to 1870.

The fort, built by order of Louis Philippe I, guards the border of the Pyrenees and protects access to the Col du Somport. Fort du Portalet is located on a cliff face underneath the Chemin de la Mâture (literally "The Mast Road") and overlooks the torrential river Gave d'Aspe. Begun in 1842 and finished in 1870, the fort replaced an earlier structure further north.

Capable of accommodating 400 men, the fort served as depot and barracks for the 18th Regiment of Infantry between 1871 and 1925. It then ceased to be used as a full-time military facility.

During World War II, the Vichy regime arrested and interned Léon Blum, Édouard Daladier, Paul Reynaud, Georges Mandel and Maurice Gamelin as political prisoners at the fort. After the Riom Trials, Reynaud was transferred to German custody and held in Germany. Mandel was taken to Paris, where he was executed in 1944 by the Milice in retaliation for the assassination earlier that year of Philippe Henriot, a Vichy official, by the Resistance. After the war, Philippe Pétain, the head of the Vichy government, was imprisoned in the fort from 15 August to 16 November 1945.

After the government abandoned the fort, it was bought by the local authorities in 1999. The access road was initially restored to ensure safe use. In 2006, work was carried out to remove overgrown vegetation, as well as to restore the roofs and terraces to protect the site from water infiltration. Subsequently, further restoration and safety work has been taking place as funding permits.
