= Urdos =

- Commune
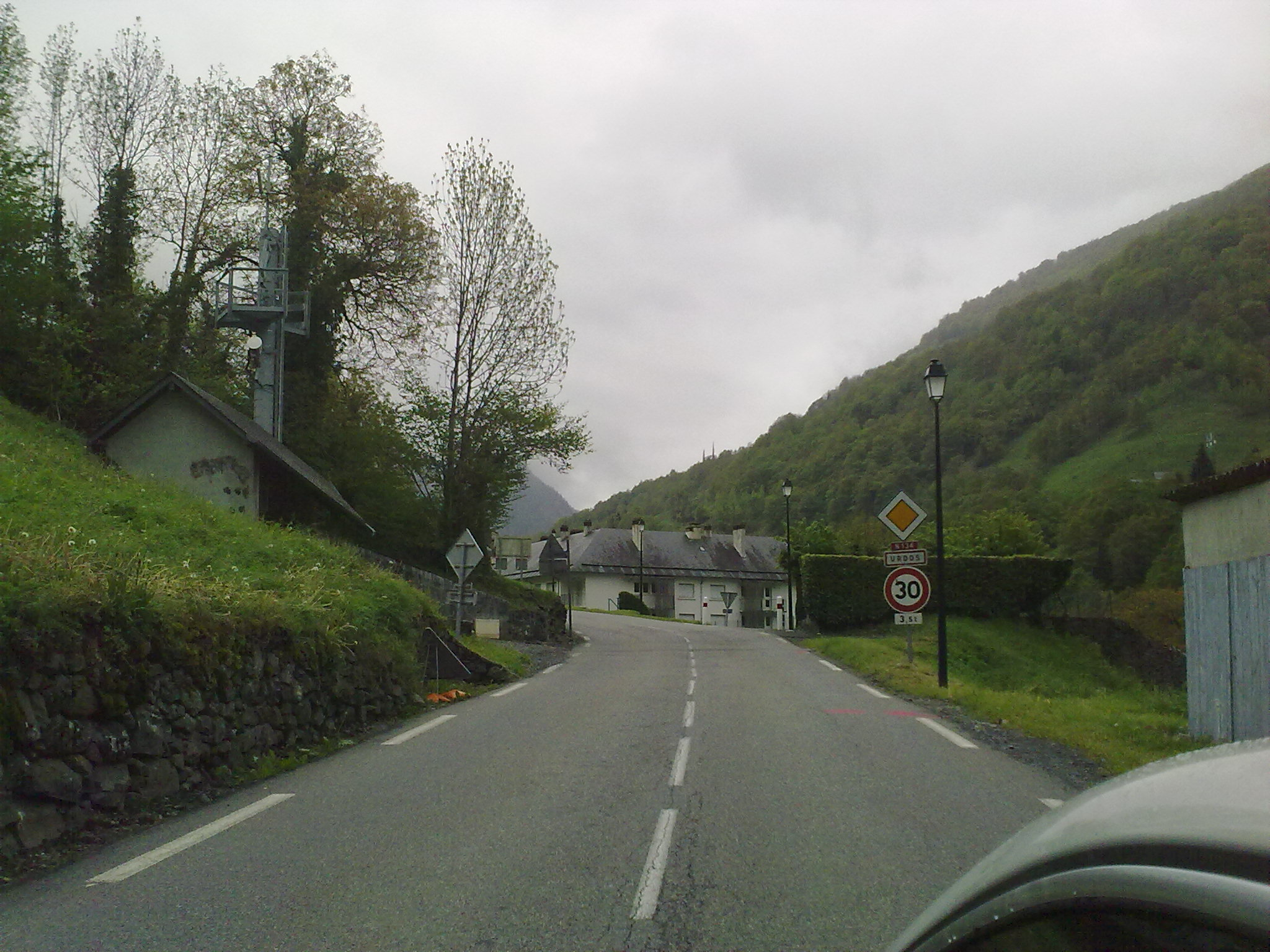
- Town entrance
- Location of Urdos
- Location within France Location within Nouvelle-Aquitaine
- Coordinates: 42°52′27″N 0°33′13″W
- Country: France
- Region: Nouvelle-Aquitaine
- Department: Pyrénées-Atlantiques
- Arrondissement: Oloron-Sainte-Marie
- Canton: Oloron-Sainte-Marie-1
- Intercommunality: Haut Béarn

Government
  - Mayor (2020–2026): Jacques Marquèze
- Area^{1}: 36.27 km^{2} (14.00 sq mi)
- Elevation: 760 m (2,490 ft)
- Highest elevation: 2,379 m (7,805 ft)
- Lowest elevation: 708 m (2,323 ft)
- Population (2023): 71
  - Density: 2.0/km^{2} (5.1/sq mi)
- Time zone: UTC+01:00 (CET)
  - Summer (DST): UTC+02:00 (CEST)
- INSEE/Postal code: 64542 /64490
- ^{1} French Land Register data, which excludes lakes, ponds, glaciers > 1 km^{2} (0.386 sq mi or 247 acres) and river estuaries.

Urdos (French pronunciation: [yʁdɔs]; Occitan: Urdòs) is a commune in the Pyrénées-Atlantiques department in south-western France.

Its station on the Pau–Canfranc railway was closed after an accident in 1970.

== See also ==
- Communes of the Pyrénées-Atlantiques department
