= Etsaut =

- Commune
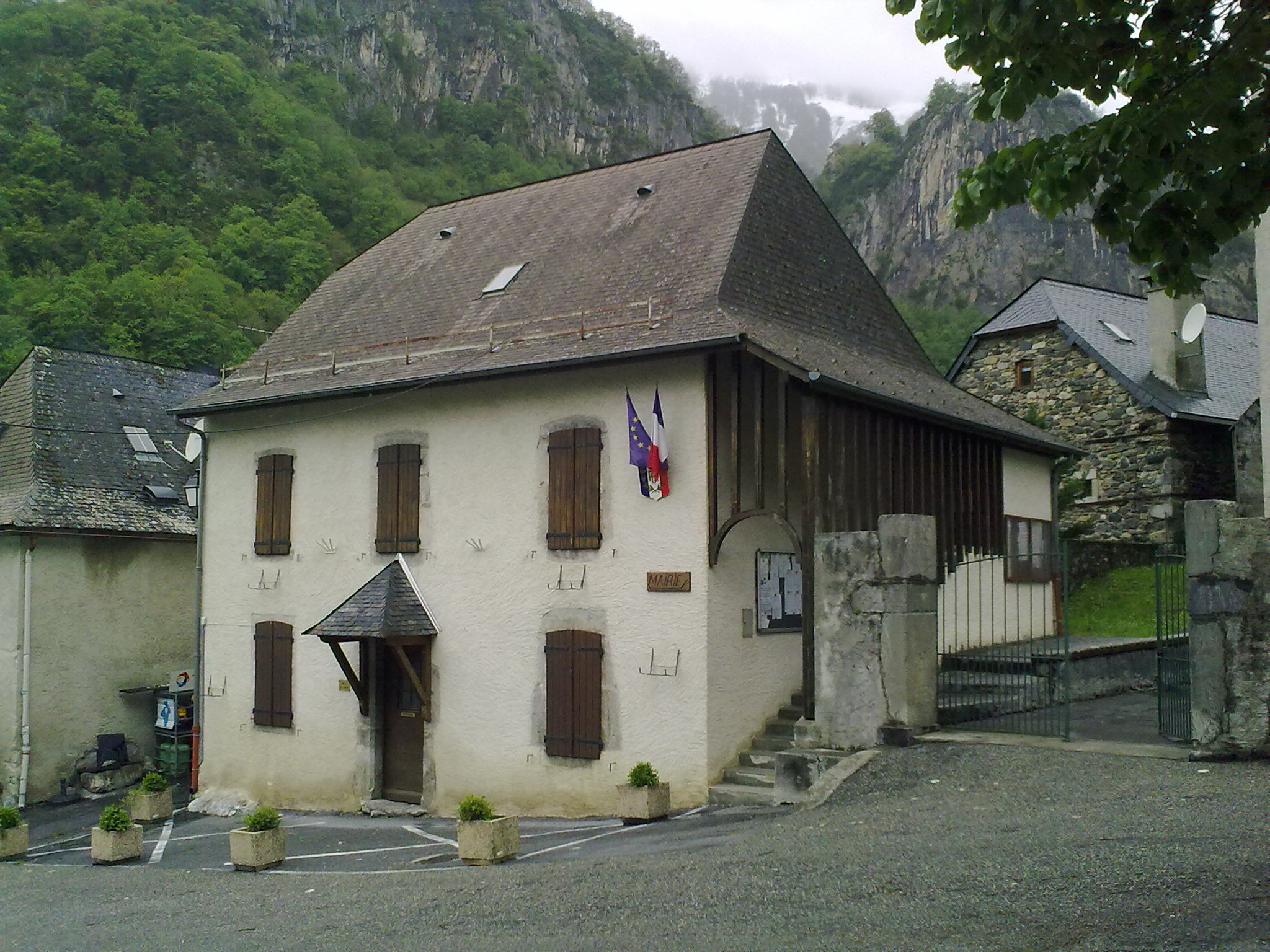
- Town Hall of Etsaut

- Coat of arms
- Location of Etsaut
- Location within France Location within Nouvelle-Aquitaine
- Coordinates: 42°54′48″N 0°34′09″W
- Country: France
- Region: Nouvelle-Aquitaine
- Department: Pyrénées-Atlantiques
- Arrondissement: Oloron-Sainte-Marie
- Canton: Oloron-Sainte-Marie-1
- Intercommunality: Haut Béarn

Government
  - Mayor (2020–2026): Damien Minvielle
- Area^{1}: 34.95 km^{2} (13.49 sq mi)
- Highest elevation: 2,606 m (8,550 ft)
- Lowest elevation: 560 m (1,840 ft)
- Population (2023): 74
  - Density: 2.1/km^{2} (5.5/sq mi)
- Time zone: UTC+01:00 (CET)
  - Summer (DST): UTC+02:00 (CEST)
- INSEE/Postal code: 64223 /64490
- ^{1} French Land Register data, which excludes lakes, ponds, glaciers > 1 km^{2} (0.386 sq mi or 247 acres) and river estuaries.

Etsaut (French pronunciation: [ɛtsot]; Occitan: Eth Saut) is a commune in the Pyrénées-Atlantiques department in south-western France.

Its station on the Pau–Canfranc railway was closed after an accident in 1970.

== See also ==
- Communes of the Pyrénées-Atlantiques department
