= Pau–Canfranc railway =

Railway in France

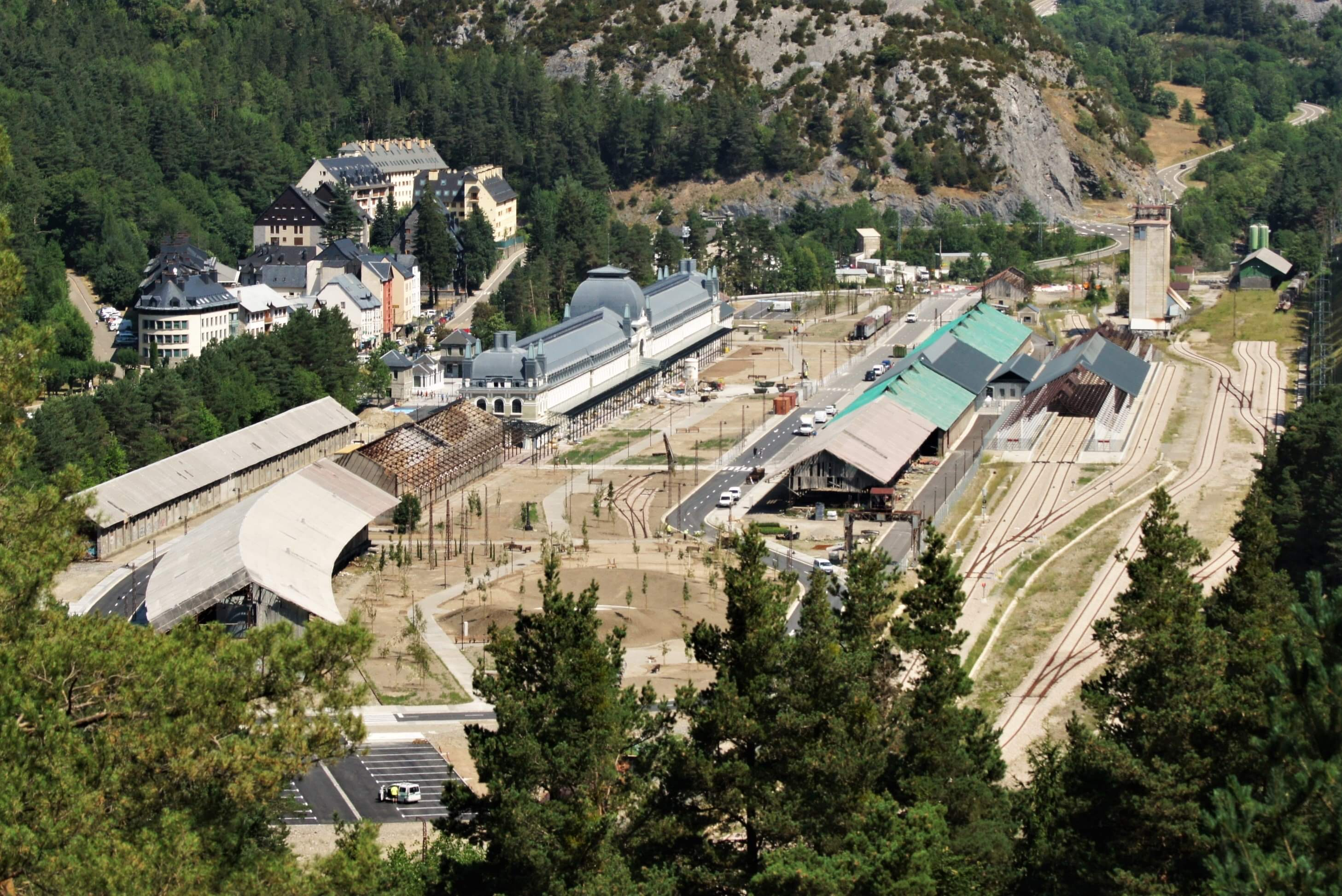
- Canfranc station: changing the former French track field into a park, August 2022

Overview
- Status: Open: Pau - Bedous; Closed: Bedous - Canfranc
- Owner: Chemins de fer du Midi (1874-1937); SNCF (1938-1997); RFF (1997-2014); SNCF (2014-present)
- Line number: 664 000
- Termini: Pau station; Bedous (Operational)

Service
- Operator: TER Nouvelle-Aquitaine

History
- Planned opening: 1883
- Opened: 1928
- Electrification: 1928 (1500 V DC overhead)
- Partial Closure: 20 March 1970: south of Bedous
- Track renewal: 2010 (Pau - Oloron) with complete dis-electrification
- Closed: Oloron - Bedous: 30 May 1980 (passengers), 1985 (freight)
- Reopened: Oloron - Bedous: 2016

Technical
- Line length: 93 km (58 mi)
- Track gauge: 1,435 mm (4 ft 8 1/2 in) standard gauge
Route map
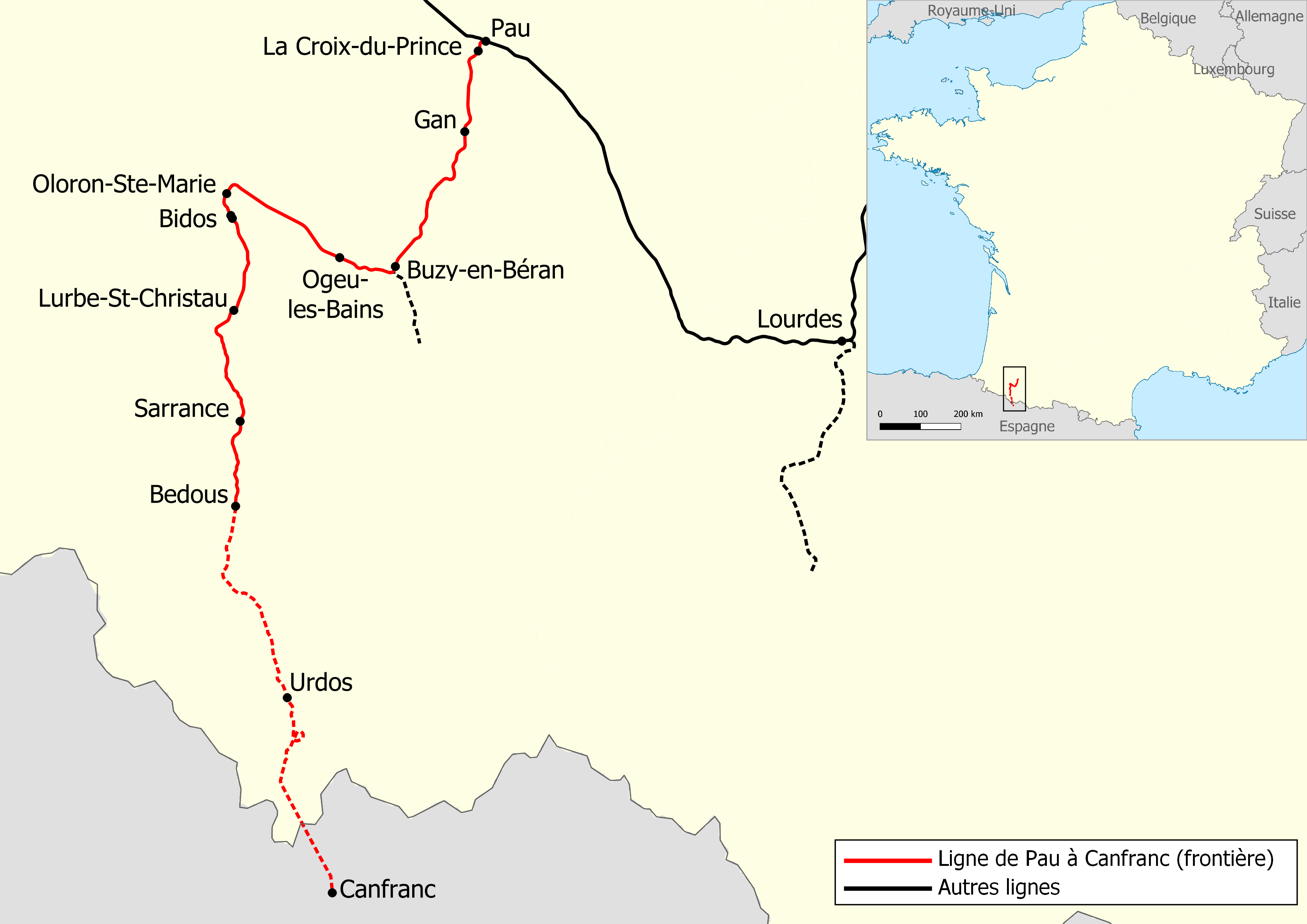

The Pau–Canfranc railway is a partially-closed 93 km (58 mi) long international single-track standard gauge railway line connecting Pau in the Pyrénées-Atlantiques region of France, climbing via the Gave d'Aspe valley and tunneling under the Pyrenees, to Canfranc in Spain. The line is part of transport infrastructure between (Toulouse or) Bordeaux and Zaragoza and is now named the Goya Line, after the painter Francisco de Goya who was born near Zaragoza and died in Bordeaux.

Opened and electrified in 1928, it was closed south of Bedous, France, after a major derailment accident on 27 March 1970, which destroyed the L'Estanguet bridge south of Accous. North of Bedous, the line was closed up to Oloron-Sainte-Marie to passengers on 30 May 1980, although it remained open for freight traffic until 1985. In August 2014, the French state railway company SNCF began work on a project to reopen this section, which happened on 1 July 2016.

This section of 59.5 km (37.0 mi) between Pau and Bedous in France is used by TER Nouvelle-Aquitaine passenger trains, whereas the branch to Arudy from Buzy was converted into a cycle path after 2012. Connecting buses run from Bedous to Canfranc, and trains still run on the Spanish side from Canfranc International Railway Station, departing south to Jaca and Zaragoza.

== History ==
=== Proposal to build - France ===
The legal title to build the Pau to Oloron-Sainte-Marie section was given to the Chemins de fer du Midi on signing of a memorandum between the company and the Minister of Agriculture, Trade and Public Works on 10 August 1868. The agreement was approved by an imperial decree on the same date, and declared a public utility and definitively granted by a law on 23 March 1874. After completing construction, this section came into operation in 1883.

On 17 July 1879 a law was passed (the Freycinet plan, covering 181 ranking railway lines of general interest. No.178 was a line from "Oloron in Bedous (Lower Pyrenees)", and further a line from "Oloron to Puyoô in Saint-Palais, by the Gave Oloron Valley". Subsequently, on 17 July 1886 No.179 was legally titled to the Chemins de fer du Midi by a separate law. The Oloron to Bedous section was declared a public utility, with the concession confirmed on 27 June 1897; the latter proposed section to Puyoô was never built, cancelled by a law on 8 July 1900.

=== International section ===
The international section from Bedous into Spain was the subject of an international convention between France and Spain signed on 18 August 1904. Approved by a French law on 10 January 1907 and promulgated by a decree on 6 February 1907, the concession to build was granted to the Chemins de fer du Midi after an agreement with the Minister of Public Works was signed on 20 June 1907, and declared a public utility by a law 2 August 1907.

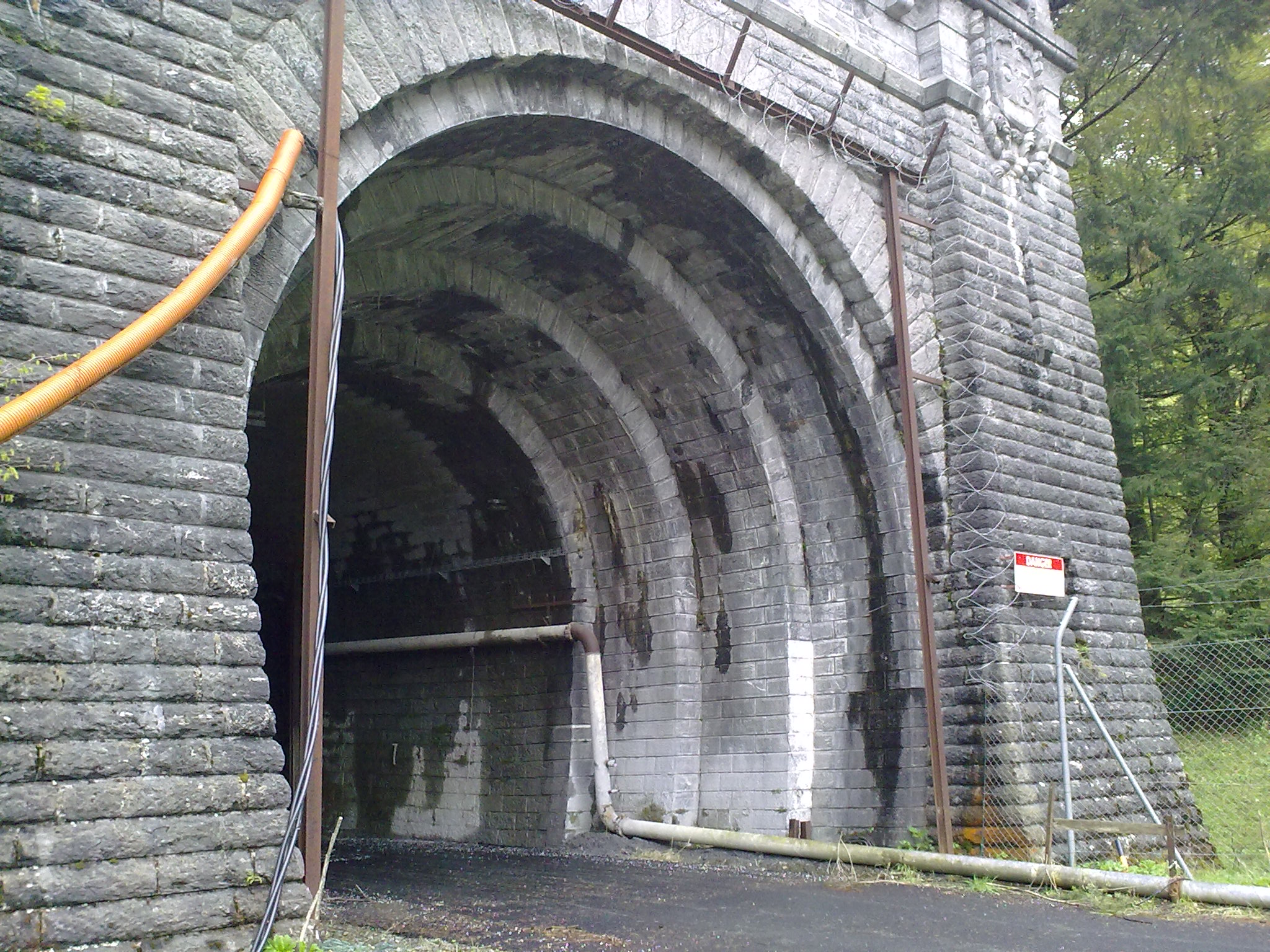
The northern French-side entrance to the Somport railway tunnel, 2010

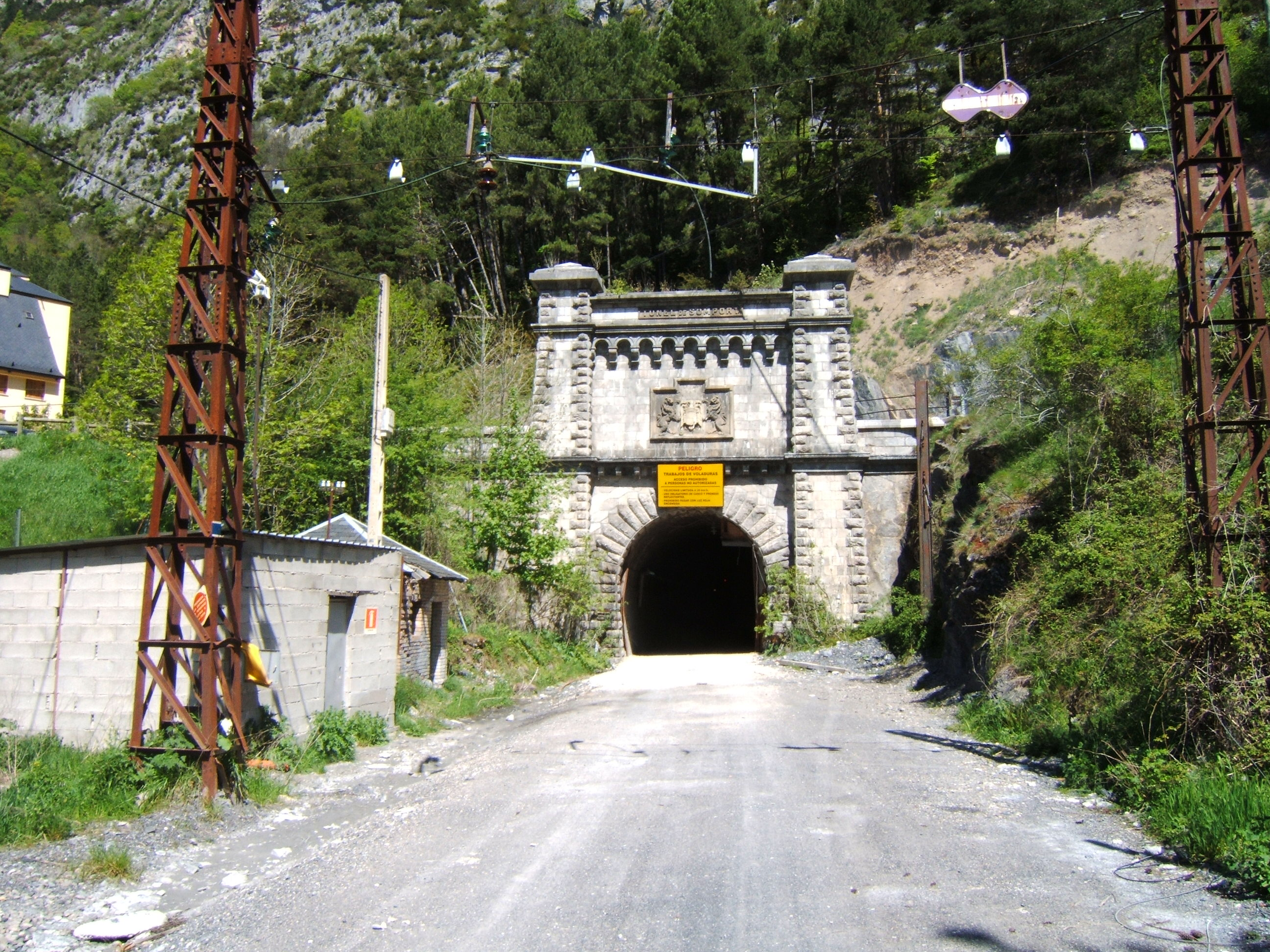
The southern Spanish-side entrance to the Somport railway tunnel, 2006

The Franco-Spanish convention was amended by a protocol signed on 15 April 1908, which provided that the required Somport tunnel would be equipped with a 1,435 mm (4 ft 8 1/2 in) track, the gauge on the French side, and that the Spanish government would fund a suitable gauge interchange station on their side. The protocol was enacted by a decree on 25 January 1909.

Construction of the Somport tunnel was inaugurated on 12 July 1912, and after delays in its construction due to World War I, completed in 1915. Spanish project engineer Ramírez de Dampierre began construction of the Canfranc International Railway Station in 1923, and it was formally opened on 18 July 1928, in the presence of King Alfonso XIII of Spain and the president of the French Republic Gaston Doumergue.

=== Operations ===
On full opening, the line converted immediately to overhead line electrification at 1500 V DC. The line was built to 1,435 mm (4 ft 8 1/2 in) gauge, but on connecting to the Iberian gauge (1,668 mm (5 ft 5 21/32 in)) track at Canfranc, the large station there allowed for suitable interchange facilities.

From Pau, France, the line follows the Gave d'Aspe valley southward, reaching Bedous (altitude 405 metres (1,329 ft)) in relatively flat terrain. After this it climbs into the Pyrénées Mountains, with an average gradient of 25 mm/m (1 in 40) to Etsaut, and then 43 mm/m (1 in 23) to the tunnel at Somport, where the line reaches its maximum altitude of 1,211 metres (3,973 ft). To reach this point from Bedous, the steeply climbing line both traverses sharp curves and passes through 14 tunnels including the spiral tunnel at Forges-d'Abel.

Due to the Franco-Spanish international convention under which it was built, the Somport tunnel and quasi-French control of the French-side of Canfranc international railway station continued during World War II. The Spanish authorities came to an operational agreement with the German Nazi Wehrmacht authorities whereby passenger train services continued, and freight trains carried mined tungsten north and French grain plus trans-shipped 95.5 short tons (86.6 t) Nazi gold south.

== Closure ==
On 20 March 1970, a nine-car train carrying corn left Pau for Canfranc (where there is still a large regional grain terminal), headed by two SNCF BB Midi locomotives, No.4227 and 4235. Having passed the station at Lescun Cette-Eygun, they started to climb the Aspe valley towards Etsaut and Urdos. This was early morning and the tracks were iced due to the humid cold, causing wheel slippage while on the steep 4.3% climb. The train came to a stop. Both locomotives' sandboxes were empty, and the engineers decided to dispense pebbles on the rails instead. They set both locomotives on rheostatic braking and climbed down from the cabin. However, the electrical substation at Urdos supplying power to the line was not working, resulting in the line voltage to be 900 volts DC instead of the nominal 1500 volts; as a result, the Bedous substation breakers tripped, leaving the unmanned train to freewheel backwards down the line. The train passed through Lescun Cette-Eygun station at more than 100 kilometres per hour (62 mph), leaving no time for the automatic road crossing to close. On reaching the bridge over Estanguet river (km 280) at such a speed, the resulting movement of the cars caused them to come off the track. The first car consequently hit the bridge and derailed the whole train, destroying the bridge. No one was killed or injured in the accident.

The accident, occurring two weeks before Good Friday, resulted in the railway service being replaced on a temporary basis with connecting buses from Bedous. Although the bridge was replaceable, the SNCF, with major operating and balance sheet debts, argued against replacement, and hence terminated service to Bedous.

Due to its length of 7,875 metres (25,837 ft) and resultant cost of maintenance, the Somport railway tunnel was converted after the line was partially closed in 1970 and rebuilt like a tramway: the railway tracks were removed and track sections inset into a hard road-like surface, allowing for joint passage of both trains and road vehicles. During the construction of the Somport road tunnel, 17 passageways were cut into the railway tunnel to allow for escape should a fire ever break out when traffic is going through the tunnel.

== Stations ==
The main stations on the line are:

Name	Image	PK (km)	Distance from Pau (km)	Altitude (m)	Status	Notes
Pau		215.7	0.0	178	Open	Connections to Bordeaux, Toulouse and Bayonne
Buzy		235.3	19.5	376	Open	Trains to Arudy, buses to Laruns
Oloron-Sainte-Marie		250.6	34.9	220	Open	
Lurbe-St-Christau		259.4	43.7	267	Open (reopened 2016)	
Bedous		275.3	59.6	407	Open (reopened 2016)	Buses to Canfranc
Urdos		290.4	74.7	714	Closed	
Canfranc		308.5	92.8	1195	Open	Buses to Bedous, trains to Jaca and Zaragoza

Note: The origin of PK is in Toulouse

== Renovation and reopening ==
In present economic development, the transport route beneath the Aspe peak via the Gave d'Aspe valley is changing from a relatively unused route into a major transport channel. This is due not only to the regional pressure between Bordeaux and Zaragoza (which on the Spanish side alone has a regional population of 1 million people), but also to the importance of the international route between Paris and Valencia. These economic pressures - in part driven by the General Motors (later PSA) plant located in Zaragoza - have in recent years resulted in heavy truck and car traffic on the roads of the upper Gave d'Aspe valley, and an increased number of accidents.

As a result, the French government placed pressure on SNCF to reopen the route to at least Bedous to allow the safe opening of the upper valley to tourists and also to service regional passenger traffic. This would then allow due economic discussion to take place between the French and Spanish governments over opening the residual section to Canfranc, something which SNCF considers not in best modern operational interests, taking into account the loading gauge restrictions of the helical tunnel at Forges-d'Abel. However, supporters point out that at no point does the current line infrastructure fall below a radius of 300 metres (980 ft), and that clearance in the helical tunnel is a minimum of 6 metres (20 ft), well in accordance with modern secondary-line criteria.

In May 2008, following a landslide on the RN 134 in January 2008 and the resultant need to use the Sens tunnel near Etsaut, President of the Aquitaine region Alain Rousset invited SNCF President Guillaume Pepy to the line, during which Pepy agreed in principle to support reopening the line.

=== Pau to Oloron-Sainte-Marie ===
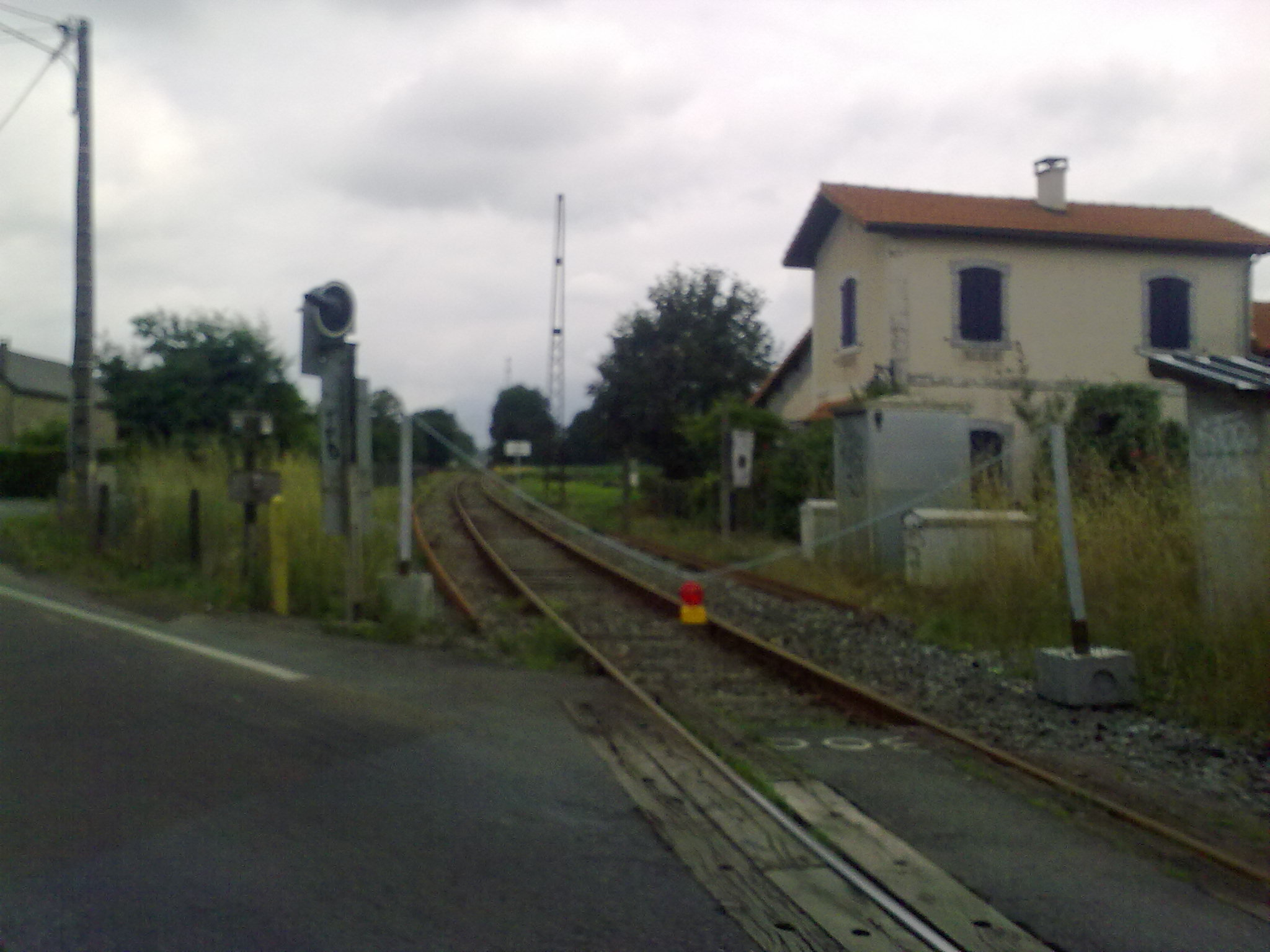
The Pau-Oloron-Sainte-Marie section during renovation, 2010

In September 2008, the major electrical substation which supplied power on the Pau to Oloron-Sainte-Marie section was turned off and removed to permit the commercial expansion of an industrial estate. In September 2010, the line was closed for six months to allow major works to be undertaken, both to the infrastructure and environment. The entire line infrastructure, including all ballast and the redundant Midi catenary, was removed, the roadways cleared and new drainage built. Then new ballast and lines were installed, laid out to allow later possible re-electrification. Finally, TER Aquitaine replaced the previously used SNCF Class X 2200 railcar units with modern SNCF Class X 73500.

=== Agreement to reopen to Canfranc ===
Since the mid-2000s, the Aquitaine region has supported the line's reopening. On 15 March 2013 Alain Rousset (President of the Aquitaine region) and Luisa Fernanda Rudi Ubeda (President of the Government of Aragon) signed a Memorandum of Understanding for a plan of cross-border cooperation up until 2020. The memorandum sets a timetable for reopening of the line in two phases, the Oloron section to Bedous in 2015, then the Bedous section across the border to Canfranc in 2020. Subsequently, the Autonomous Community of Aragon acquired the Canfranc station from RENFE with a plan to restore and develop it as a catalyst (tourism, academic, economic) for the region.

After signing the memorandum, the Aquitaine Regional Council (ARC) commissioned SNCF to undertake preliminary studies on opening the 25 km (16 mi) section from Oloron-Sainte-Marie to Bedous, and to survey the whole line to Canfranc. The study found that all tunnels on the line were in good condition, except for the sidewall of Peilhou tunnel that had collapsed. Similarly, the bridges are still in place, except south of Bedous towards Canfranc, where there are three major areas of work required:

- Estanguet bridge, destroyed by the 1970 accident
- Bigue bridge over the river Aspe, south of Accous. The bridge was destroyed by a flood on 5 October 1992. Since then, the building of the RN 134 bypass road from Bedous and Accous (6.5 km (4.0 mi), which cost EUR 41.66 million) has also removed the approach infrastructure
- Peilhou and Serbers viaducts. During the construction of the RN 134, retaining the viaducts would have created too sharp a curve on the road. Consequently, it was agreed to keep both viaducts intact but remove one approach embankment of each viaduct, to enable the creation of a wider road.

Despite an unfavorable opinion from both the public enquiry and the Commission of Inquiry, ARC declared the project a public utility by the signing of the decree on 19 February 2014.

=== Reopening of Oloron-Sainte-Marie to Bedous ===
SNCF were commissioned by ARC to undertake full costings and present a project plan for the reopening of the Oloron-Sainte-Marie to Bedous section. The SNCF reported that substantial work was required, including the replacement of 12 bridge decks, rebuilding of all road crossings to modern unmanned standards, and full renovation of all stations. Further, SNCF stated the requirement of modern landslide protection along the line. The ARC announced that the project was valued €122M, with €100M coming from ARC's budget and a minimum of €30M coming from other sources, mainly the French government and EU grants.

Following delays in agreement on budget funding, SNCF began work on 26 September 2014 with a projected opening to Bedous by March 2016. In a replication of the project to renovate the Pau to Oloron-Sainte-Marie section, the project included removal of all line infrastructure; renovation of all earthworks and bridges; removal of two road crossings and renovation of all other crossings to modern unmanned standards; installation of the required landslide protection and mats; and then track re-laying with new ballast, concrete sleepers and steel rails.

SNCF proposed installation of Automatic Block restricted permissiveness signalling between Oloron and Bedous. There are three sections: Bidos, Lurbe-Saint-Christau and Bedous.

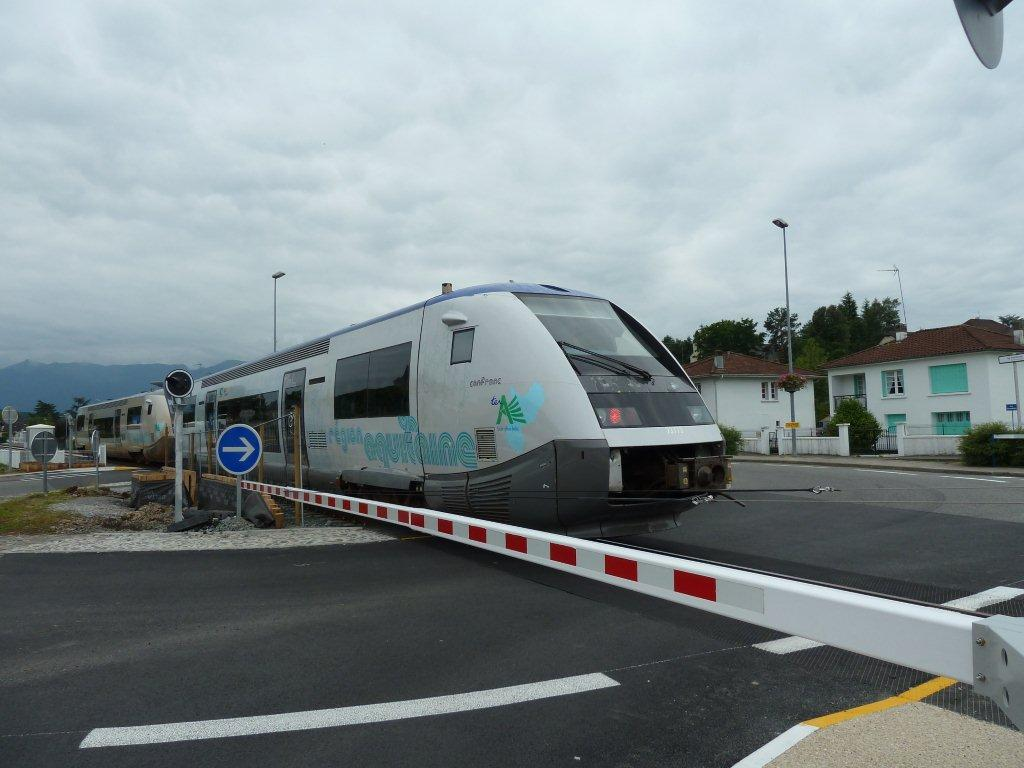
The most obvious resistance: The community of Bidos hoped a roundabout could prevent the line from being reopened.

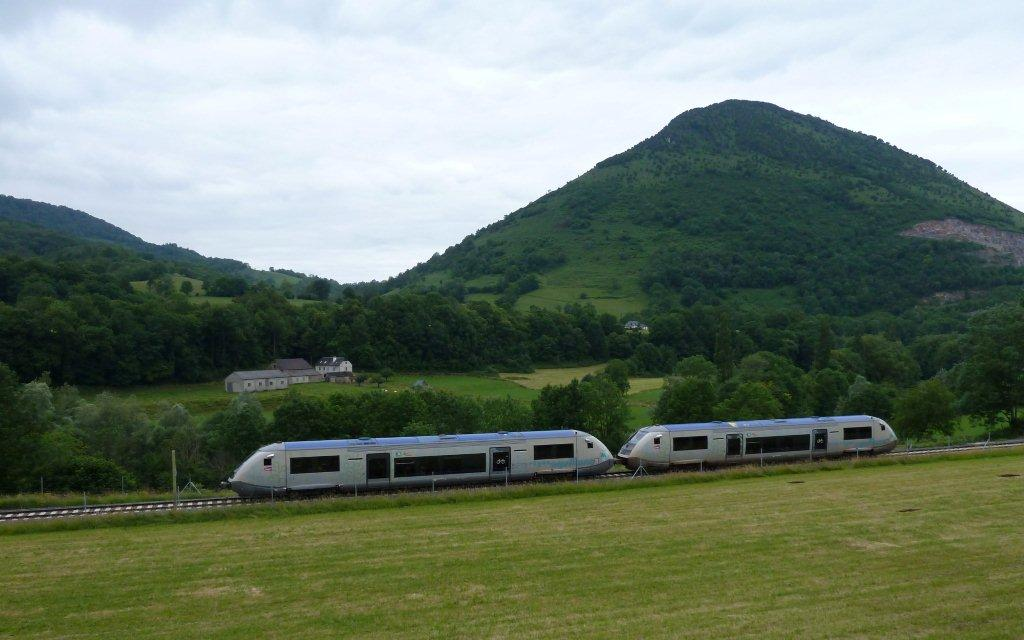
Between Lurbe und Sarrance, hills turn into mountains, ...

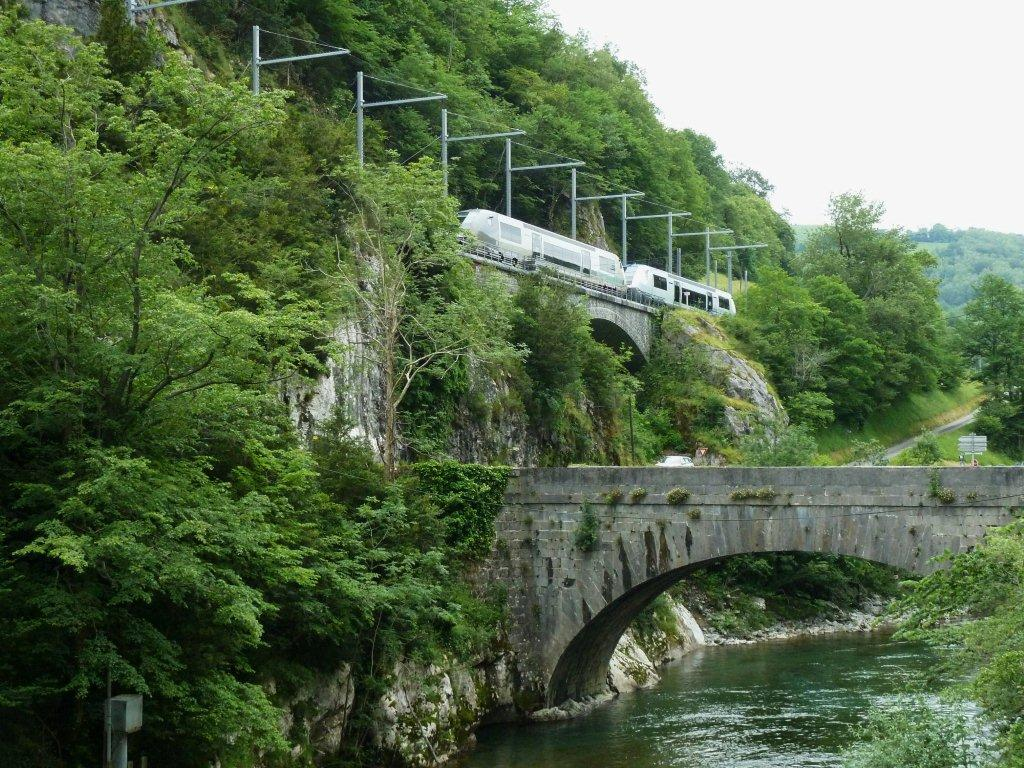
... , and new facilities protect the line from falling rocks.

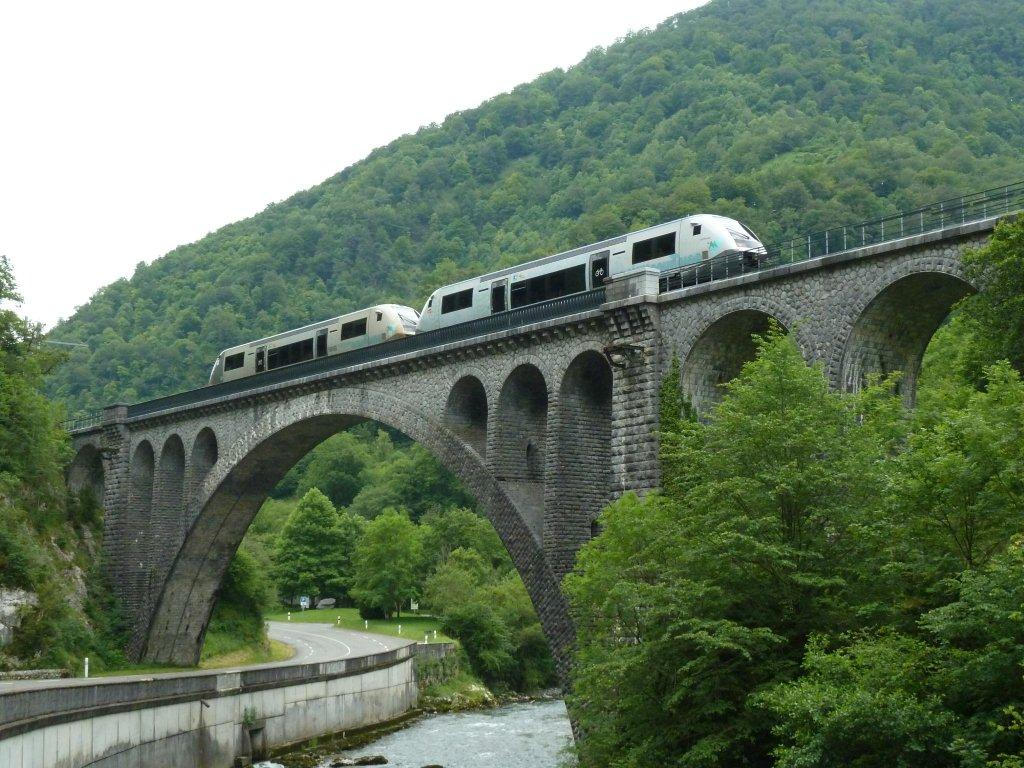
The Escot viaduct

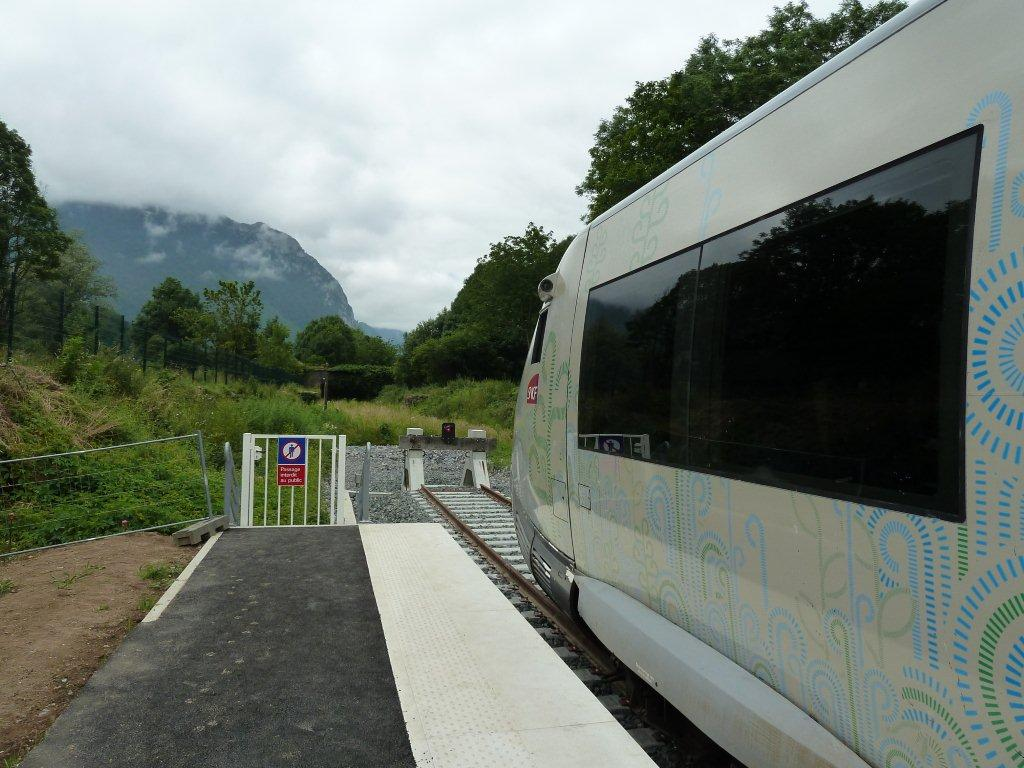
Bedous has been reached, but as of 1914, the most demanding part of the line is still missing.

=== Canfranc station/hotel and railway current status (2026) ===
Limiting Canfranc station to its former freight part was completed in April 2021, changing the former track fields around the station building into a park and a road to access the buildings by the end of 2022. The hotel opened towards the end of January 2023, all the Spanish track is equipped with sleepers convertible to standard gauge. With EU support it was hoped in 2022 that the Canfranc line and station would be fully operational by 2026". In June 2026 the French authorities plan to rebuild the French part of the line by 2035.

== See also ==
- Canfranc Underground Laboratory
