= Bedous =

- Commune
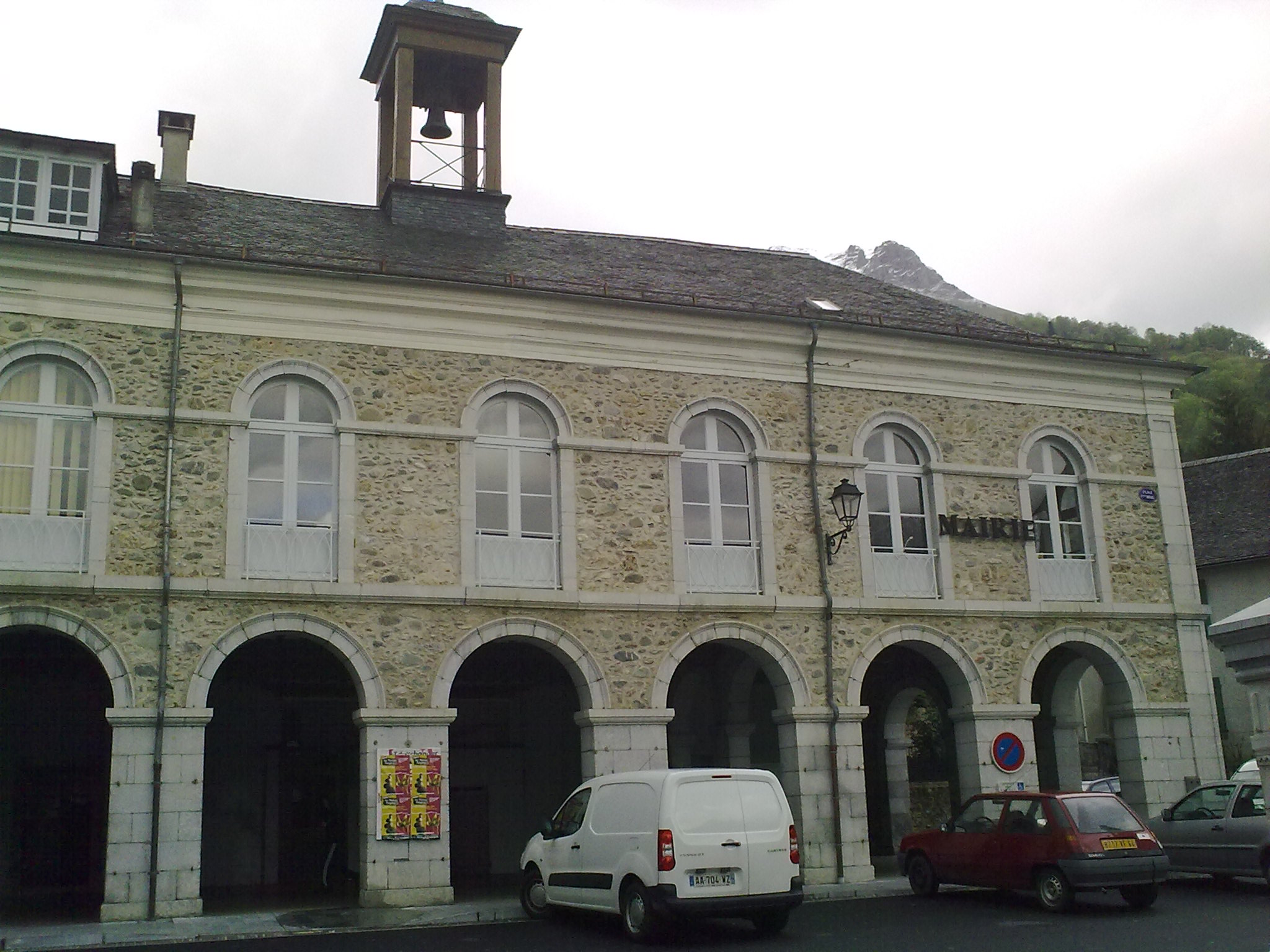
- Town hall
- Location of Bedous
- Location within France Location within Nouvelle-Aquitaine
- Coordinates: 43°00′03″N 0°35′57″W
- Country: France
- Region: Nouvelle-Aquitaine
- Department: Pyrénées-Atlantiques
- Arrondissement: Oloron-Sainte-Marie
- Canton: Oloron-Sainte-Marie-1

Government
  - Mayor (2020–2026): Henri Bellegarde
- Area^{1}: 11.64 km^{2} (4.49 sq mi)
- Highest elevation: 1,565 m (5,135 ft)
- Lowest elevation: 372 m (1,220 ft)
- Population (2023): 568
  - Density: 48.8/km^{2} (126/sq mi)
- Time zone: UTC+01:00 (CET)
  - Summer (DST): UTC+02:00 (CEST)
- INSEE/Postal code: 64104 /64490
- ^{1} French Land Register data, which excludes lakes, ponds, glaciers > 1 km^{2} (0.386 sq mi or 247 acres) and river estuaries.

Bedous (French pronunciation: [bədus]; Gascon: Bedós) is a commune of the Pyrénées-Atlantiques department in southwestern France. It is the birthplace of Pierre Laclède, the Frenchman who founded the U.S. city of St. Louis.

Its station on the Pau–Canfranc railway was closed after an accident in 1970, but re-opened in 2016 as the terminus of service from Pau.

== See also ==
- Communes of the Pyrénées-Atlantiques department
