= Petit train d'Artouste =

Gauge tourist railway in French Pyrenees

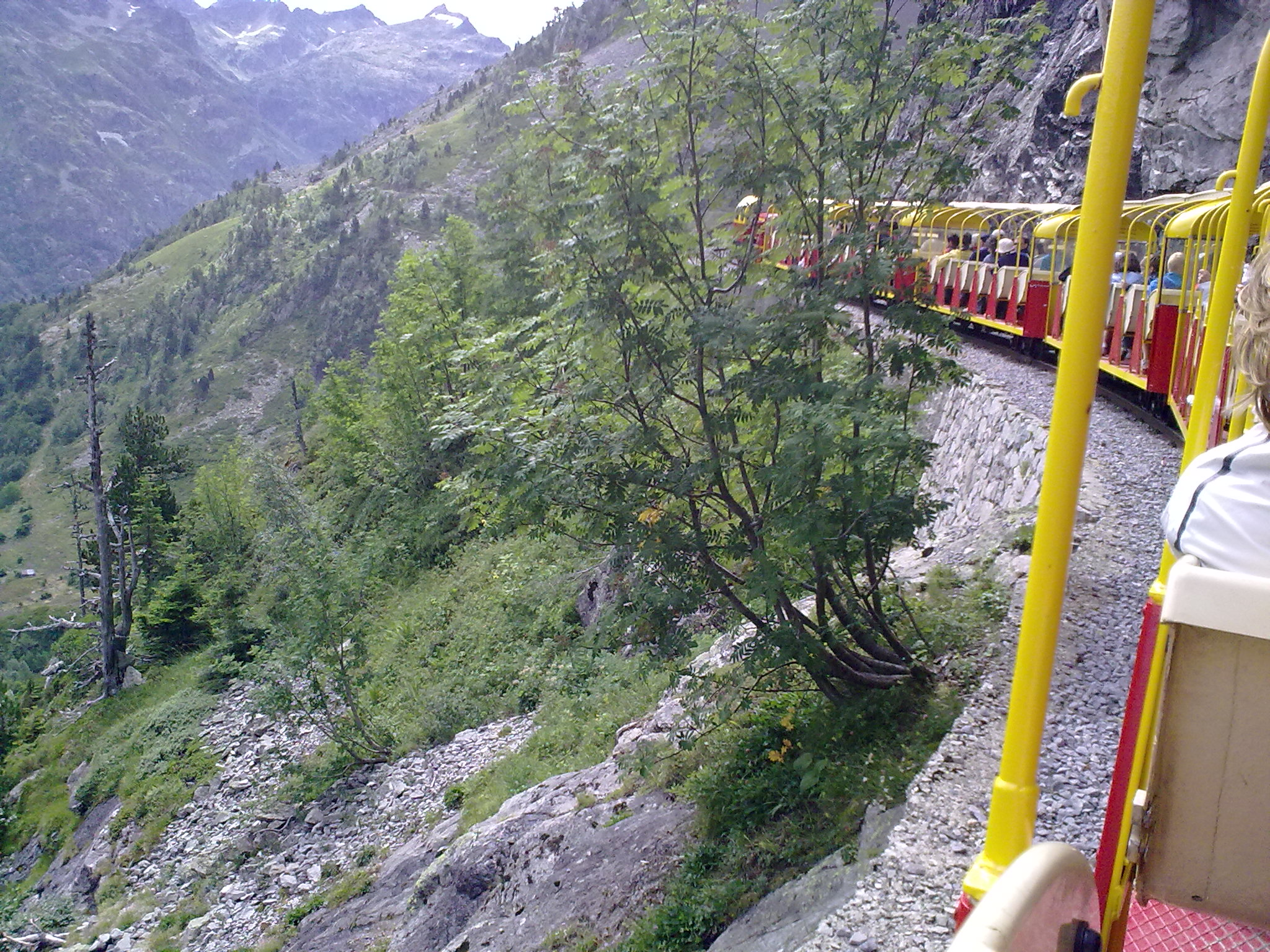
- The train on route

Overview
- Status: Operational
- Locale: Laruns, Pyrénées-Atlantiques, France
- Termini: Ossau2000; Lac d'Artouste

Service
- Type: Light railway

Technical
- Line length: 10 km (6.2 mi)
- Number of tracks: Single track
- Track gauge: 500 mm (19 3/4 in)
- Operating speed: 15 km/h (9.3 mph)
- Highest elevation: 1,940 m

The Petit train d'Artouste is a narrow gauge tourist railway situated in the French Pyrenees close to the Spanish border, some 55 km (34.2 mi) south of the town of Pau, and within the commune of Laruns. The line runs high above the headwaters of the Gave d'Ossau, and provides access to the Lac d'Artouste, a semi-artificial lake in the mountains at an altitude of nearly 2,000 m (6,562 ft). It is the second-highest railway in France after the Tramway du Mont-Blanc.

The line was originally constructed for the Compagnie des Chemins de Fer du Midi (CFM), the then main line railway operator in the area to the north of the Pyrenees. As part of a program of electrifying these lines, the CFM constructed a series of hydro-electric power stations in the valley of the Ossau between the years 1920 and 1932. Significant civil engineering works were required in order to provide access to these works, and included the line now used by the petit train. Once this work was finished, the CFM recognised the tourist potential of the line, and the first tourist trains were run.

Today the petit train is reached by a gondola from a lower station at Artouste-Fabrèges, on the Lac de Fabrèges in the valley of the Gave du Brousset. This lower station is at an altitude of 1,240 m (4,068 ft) and accessible by road. The gondola climbs to an upper station (known as Ossau2000) at an altitude of 1,920 m (6,299 ft), where passengers change to the petit train. After leaving Ossau2000, the line runs through a 315 m (1,033 ft) tunnel, crossing under the ridge to reach a point high above the valley of the Gave de Soussouéou, another of the Gave d'Ossau's tributaries. From here the line runs along a twisting and vertiginous ledge above that valley until it reaches the dam of the Lac d'Artouste. The culminating point of the railway, shortly after the starting point, is approximately 1,940 m.

The line is 10 km (6.2 mi) long and is built to a gauge of 500 mm (19 3/4 in). Trains consist of 6 12-seat carriages pulled by a diesel locomotive, and operate from late May or early July until the end of September or early October. They are subject to a maximum speed of 15 km/h (9.3 mph) and the end to end journey takes just under one hour. On busy days, up to 10 trains are used providing 3 departures per hour, whilst at other times departures are hourly. Trains depart from 08.30 until 14:30 or later in the high season.

== Gallery ==
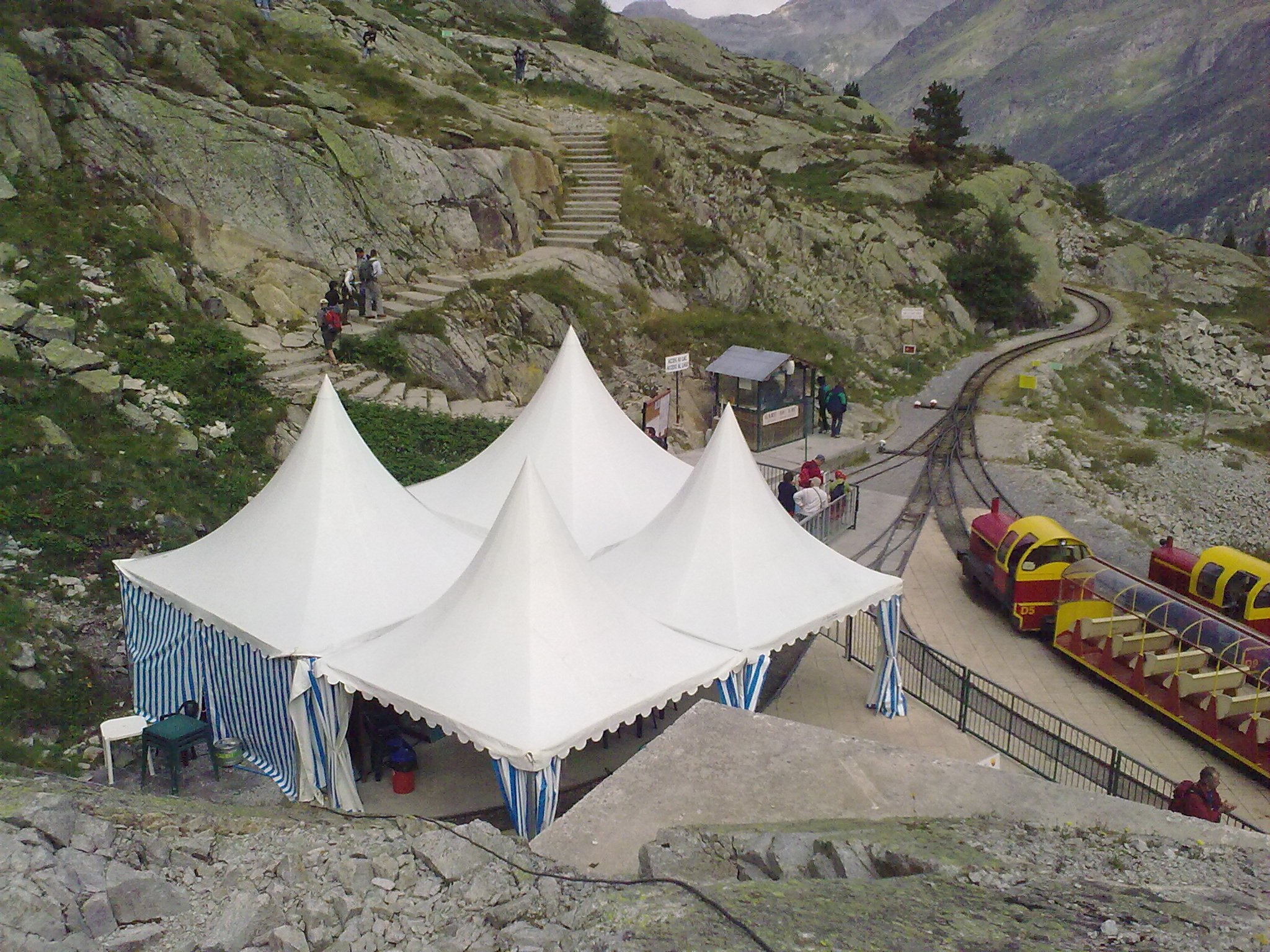
The Lac d'Artouste terminus

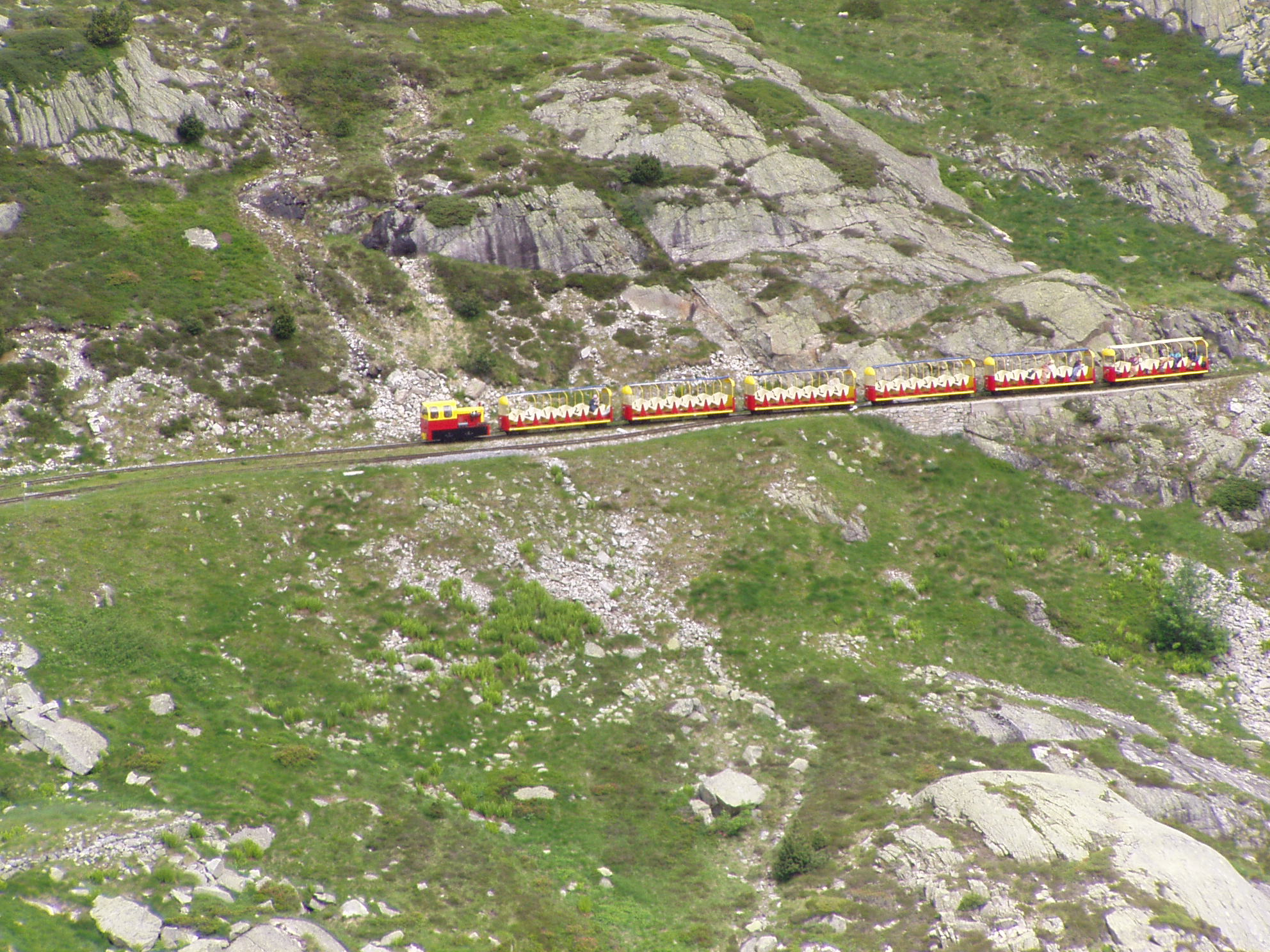
The train arriving at the terminus

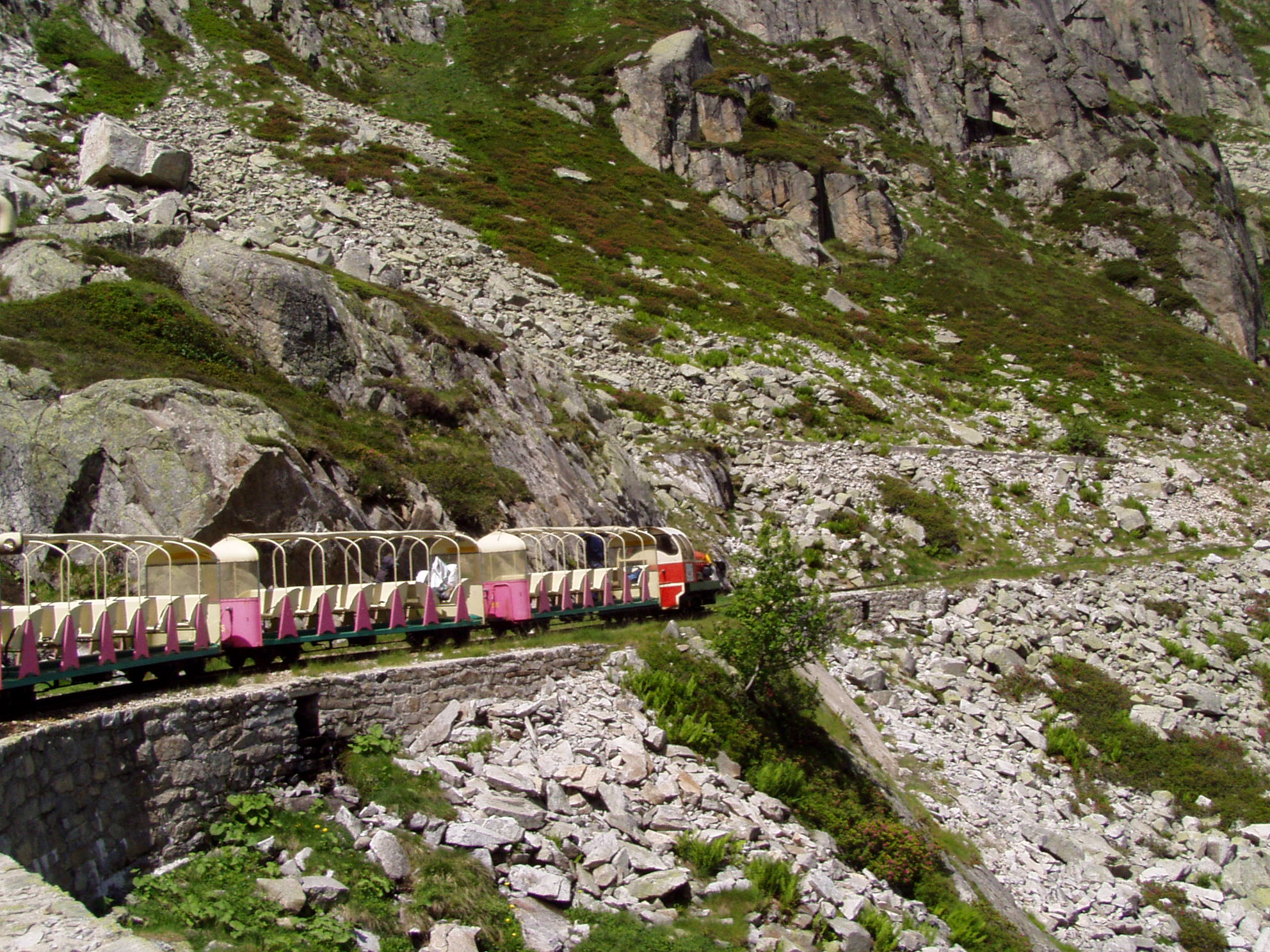
Train on route

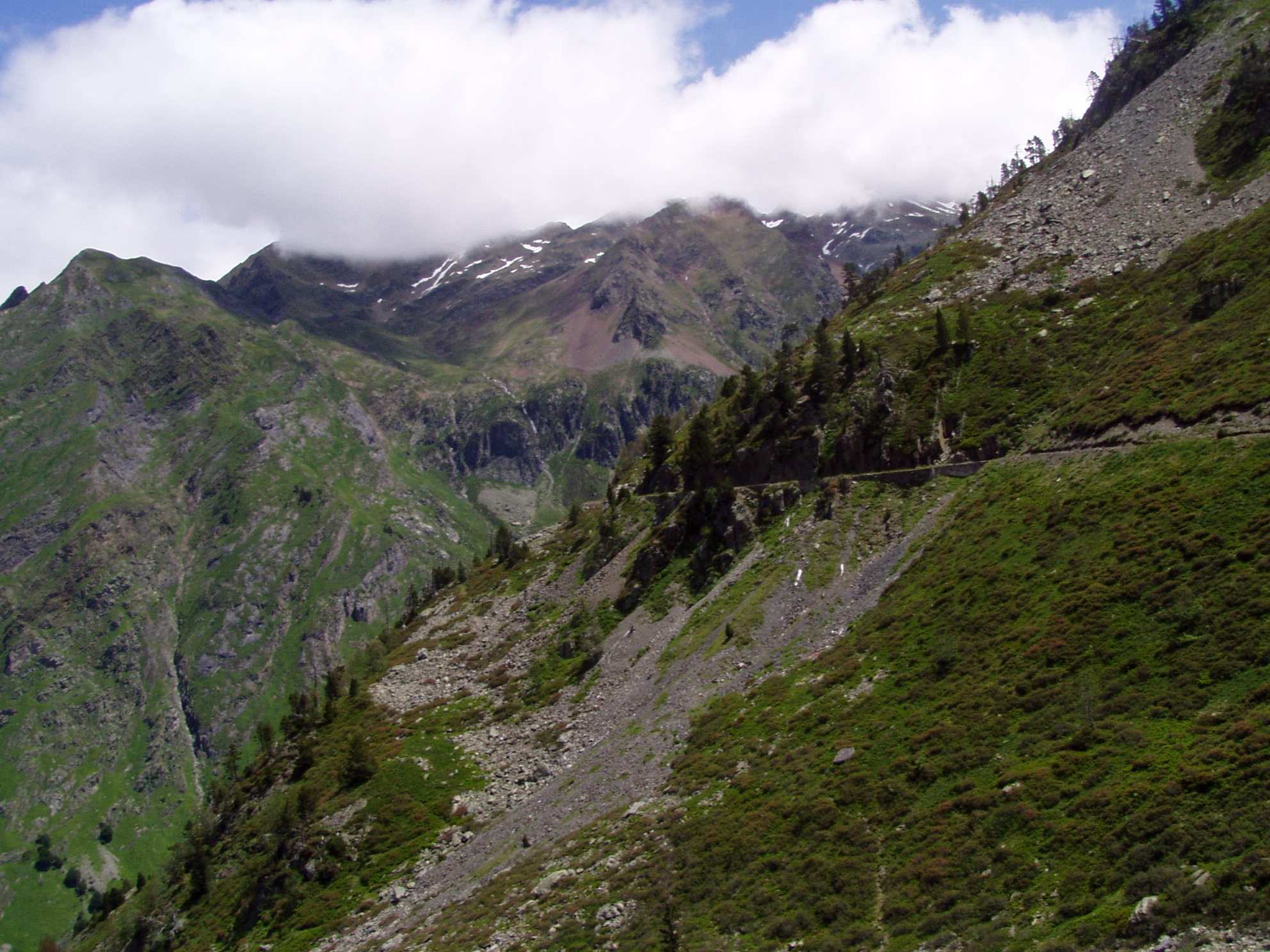
The line seen from below

== See also ==
- List of highest railways in Europe
