= Artouste =

Winter sports resort in the French Pyrenees

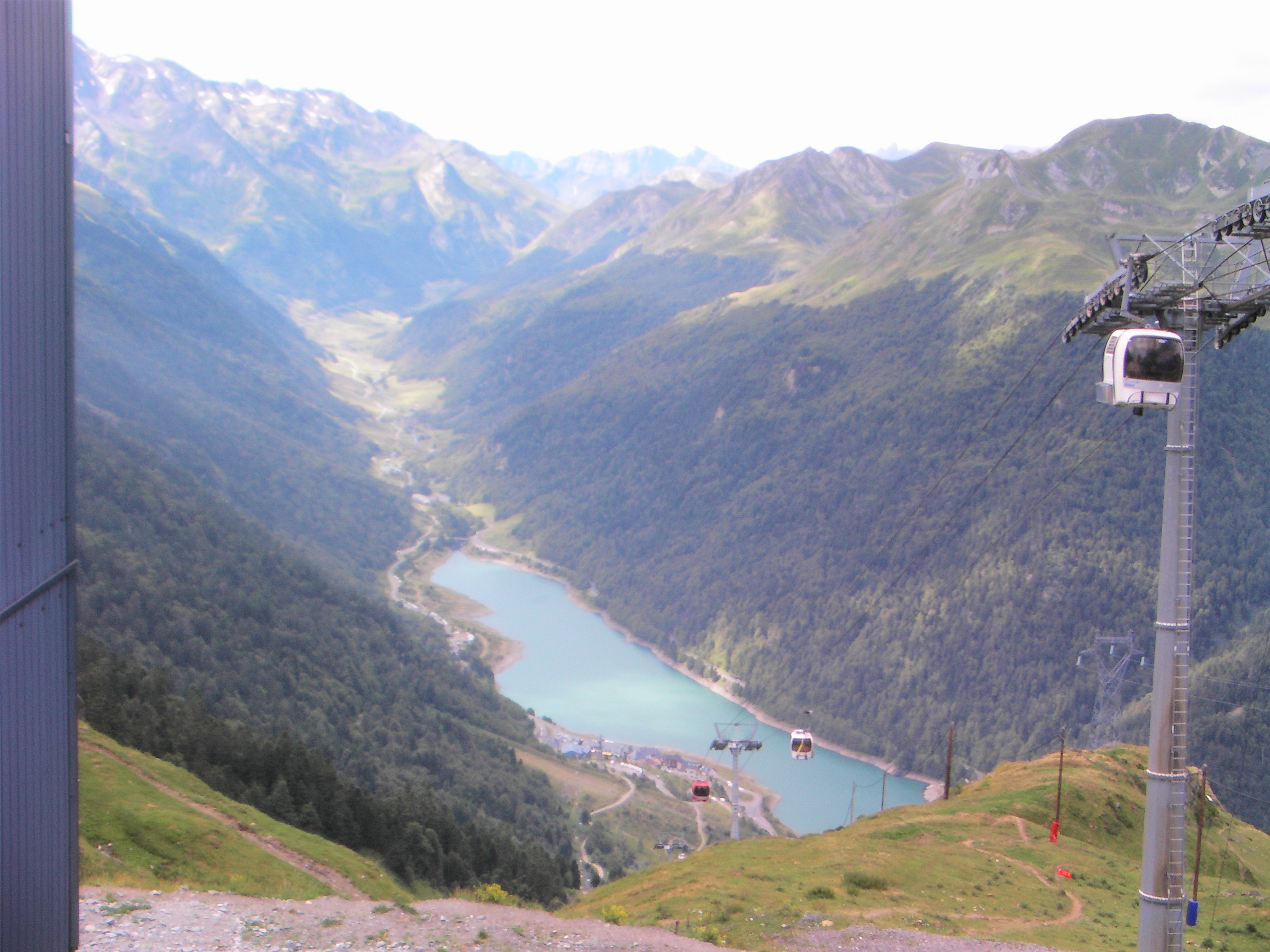
- The Artouste gondola lift with a view over the Lac de Fabrèges

- Location within France Location within Nouvelle-Aquitaine Location within Pyrenees
- Location: Laruns, Pyrénées-Atlantiques, Nouvelle-Aquitaine, France
- Nearest city: Pau
- Coordinates: 42°53′51″N 0°23′46″W
- Top elevation: 2,100 m (6,900 ft)
- Base elevation: 1,350 m (4,430 ft)
- Trails: 20
- Total length: 25 km (16 mi)
- Website: www.artouste.fr

Artouste, or Artouste-Fabrèges, (Occitan: Artosta e Habrèjas) is a winter sports resort in the French Pyrenees. It is located in the commune of Laruns in the department of Pyrénées-Atlantiques and the region of Nouvelle-Aquitaine. The resort operates the Petit train d'Artouste during the summer period. In the face of climate change, the resort is also developing ancillary activities to compensate for an expected lack of snow in winter.

== Geography ==
Artouste is located in the high Béarn, in the Ossau Valley, near the Lac de Fabrèges. The resort is located in the heart of the Natura 2000 site of the Massif de Ger. Artouste is located southwest of the ski resort of Gourette and is about 10 km (6.2 mi) from the France–Spain border north of Formigal. The resort of Artouste is accessible by road. The resort can be reached via the RD 431 and the RD 934 roads, which connect Laruns to the Col du Pourtalet and Spain.

== History ==
The Lac d'Artouste was discovered at the end of the nineteenth century, by Ludovic Gaurier. The discovery attracted the Société hydroélectrique du Midi, which wanted to use the lake for a hydroelectric power station.

=== Hydroelectric power and railways ===
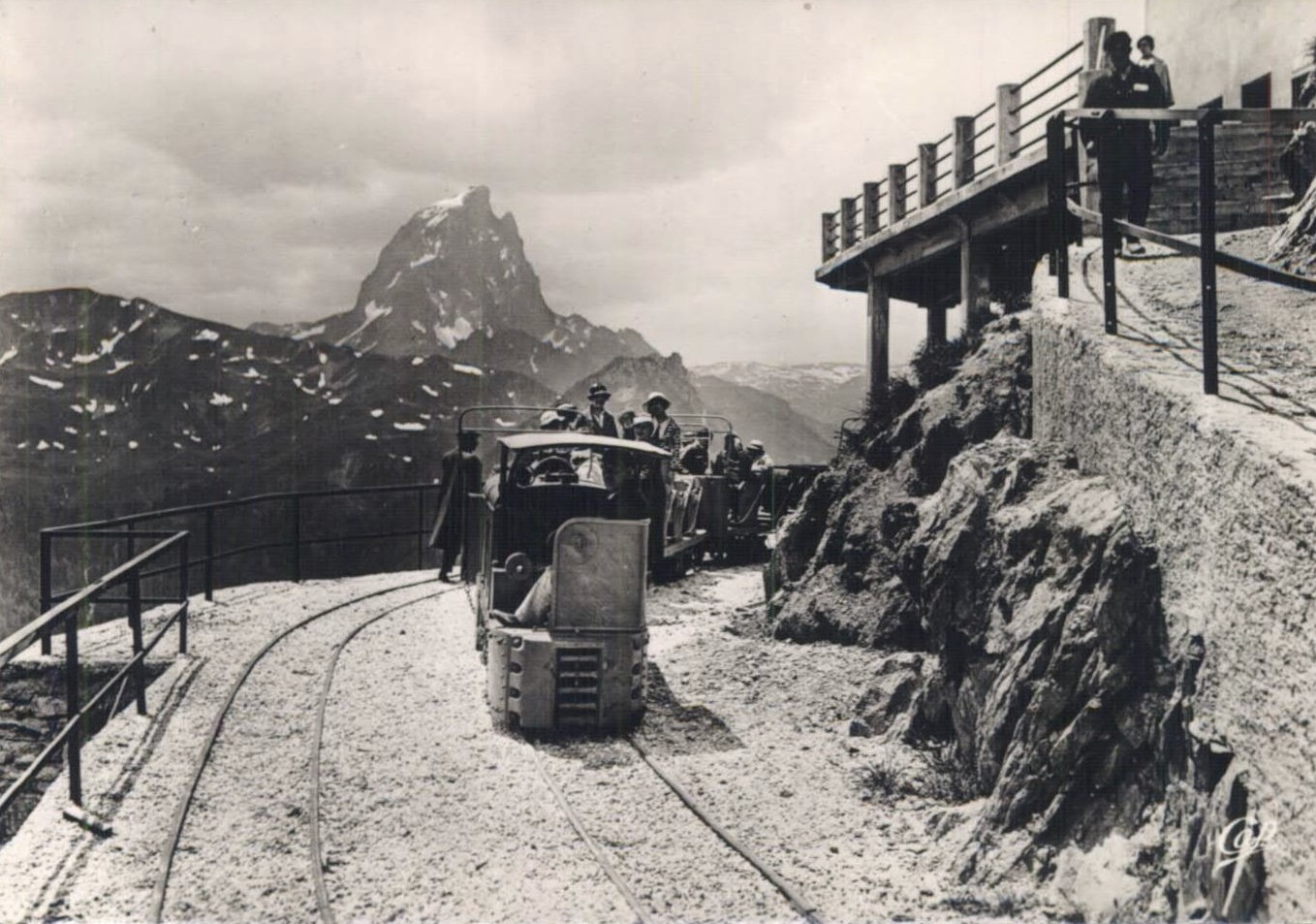
The Petit train d'Artouste with the Pic du Midi d'Ossau during the early 20th century

With the aim of building a hydroelectric dam at the Lac d'Artouste, the Compagnie des chemins de fer du Midi built a railway between La Sagette and the construction site in 1920. The dam was completed in 1929. In the 1930s, the Artouste estate was opened to tourism via the Petit train d'Artouste, which utilised the railway line.

=== Skiing ===
In 1966, the commune of Laruns undertook the creation of a downhill ski resort at Artouste. The station, initially called Artouste-La Sagette, was inaugurated on 15 December 1967. The commune managed the resort from its opening. In view of a chronic financial deficit, management of the resort was entrusted to an outside organisation in 1978. In 1984, the village of Fabrèges was created on the shores of the Lac de Fabrèges, at an altitude of 1,250 m (4,100 ft). Fabrèges is located at the base of the Sagette gondola lift leading to the resort.

==== The revival of the resort ====
In 2006, the resort was declared bankrupt and was taken over. In 2019, after a year of litigation, an agreement was reached between the commune of Laruns and the resort operator. On 1 April 2019, the commune of Laruns took over the direct management of the resort and the Petit train d'Artouste. Since then, the resort's management has been coordinating the creation of new all-weather activities. In June 2019, the resort became the first resort in the Pyrenees to offer mountain karting, an activity already present in the French Alps.

== Sport and leisure ==
=== Winter activities ===
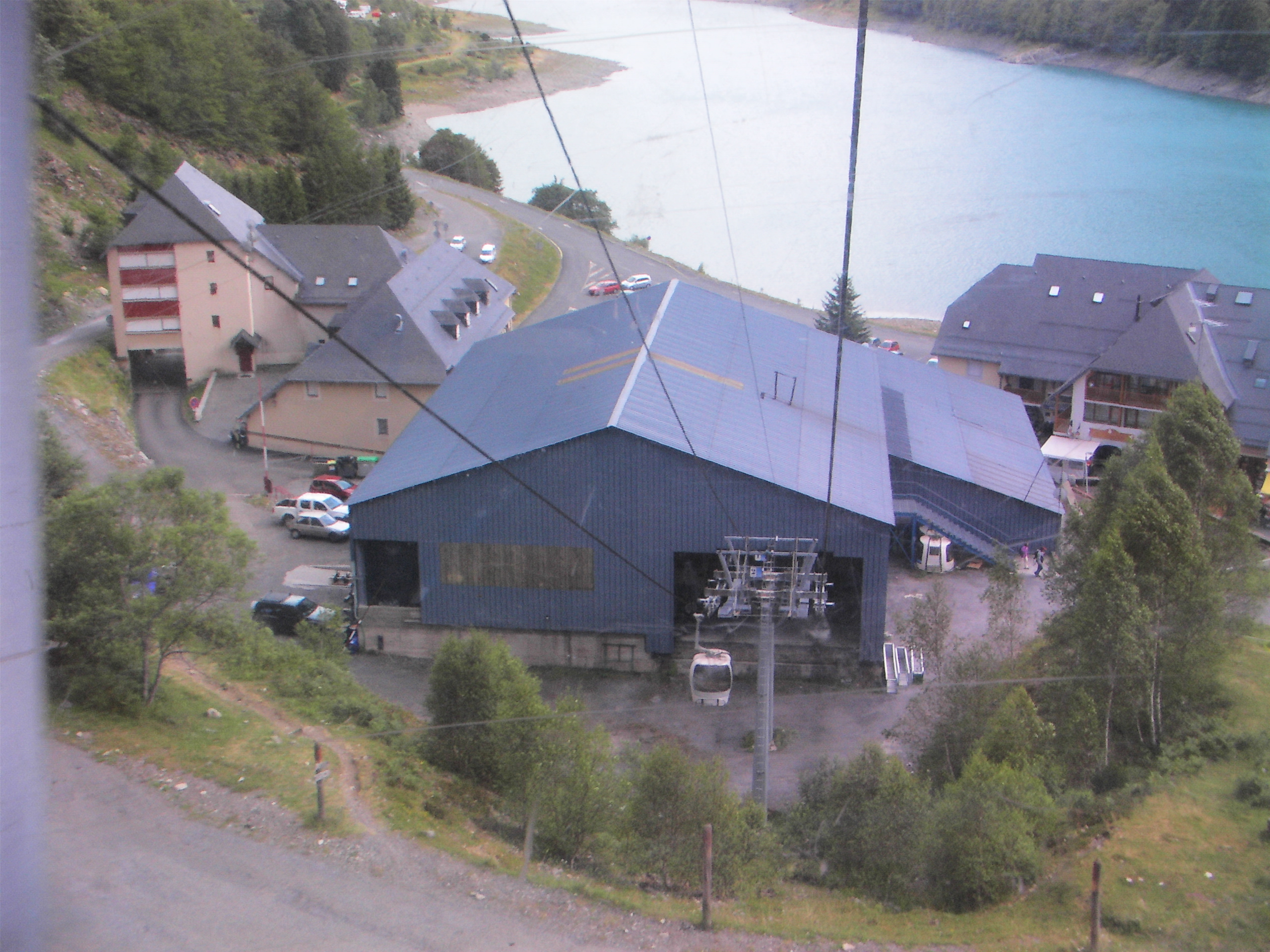
The gondola lift departure station, in Fabrèges

The ski resort of Artouste is located on the massif of the Pic de la Sagette, and connected to the Lac de Fabrèges by the Sagette gondola lift. It is necessary to take another lift to access the snowpark at 2,100 m (6,900 ft), the summit of the resort. The resort is organised into four sectors, catering for skiers from beginner to expert.

=== Summer activities ===
==== The Petit train d'Artouste and hiking trails ====
The resort is known for its train running at an altitude of around 2,000 m (6,600 ft), which is the highest narrow-gauge railway in Europe, and operates from the top of the Sagette gondola lift to the Lac d'Artouste on 10 km (6.2 mi) of track. During the summer months of 2024, it carried more than 112,000 passengers. From the end of the railway line at the Lac d'Artouste, several hiking routes are available to visitors, including towards the GR 10 hiking route.

==== Cycling ====
The resort hosted the finish of stage 3 of the Tour of the Pyrenean Piedmont in 2023 and 2024.

Artouste was also the host of the Young Mountain Biker Trophy in 2015.

==== Mountain karting ====
Artouste was the host of the 2021 Mountain Kart World Championship.

==== Other summer activities ====
According to forecasts by the Pyrenean Climate Change Observatory, the snow will be half as thick by the early 2050s. In addition, a month less of snow is expected. To cope with this, the resort has invested in other activities such as a mountain go-kart track, zip line, water sports facilities and a wellness area.

== Projects and controversies ==
In 2016, the resort decided to renovate its gondola lifts. This was expected to cost €5.5 million for the commune of Laruns, the owner of the gondola. Since 2013, the resort has been considering the creation of an artificial ski slope in order to have an alternative to snow cannons. In 2024, during debates within the Regional Council of Nouvelle-Aquitaine in order to grant a budget to this project, The Ecologists' elected representatives contested it on the basis of potential harm to the fauna and flora of a Natura 2000 classified site. Elected officials described the resort as a "Disneyland Mountain". For a long time, there has been discussion of a better physical link between Gourette and Artouste, to improve upon the off-piste route that already connects the two ski areas. Other projects are currently being studied to revitalise the resort in winter, in particular to improve its position on ski mountaineering and snowshoeing. The creation of a second zip line and the installation of a summer toboggan were also considered.
