= Aste-Béon =

- Commune
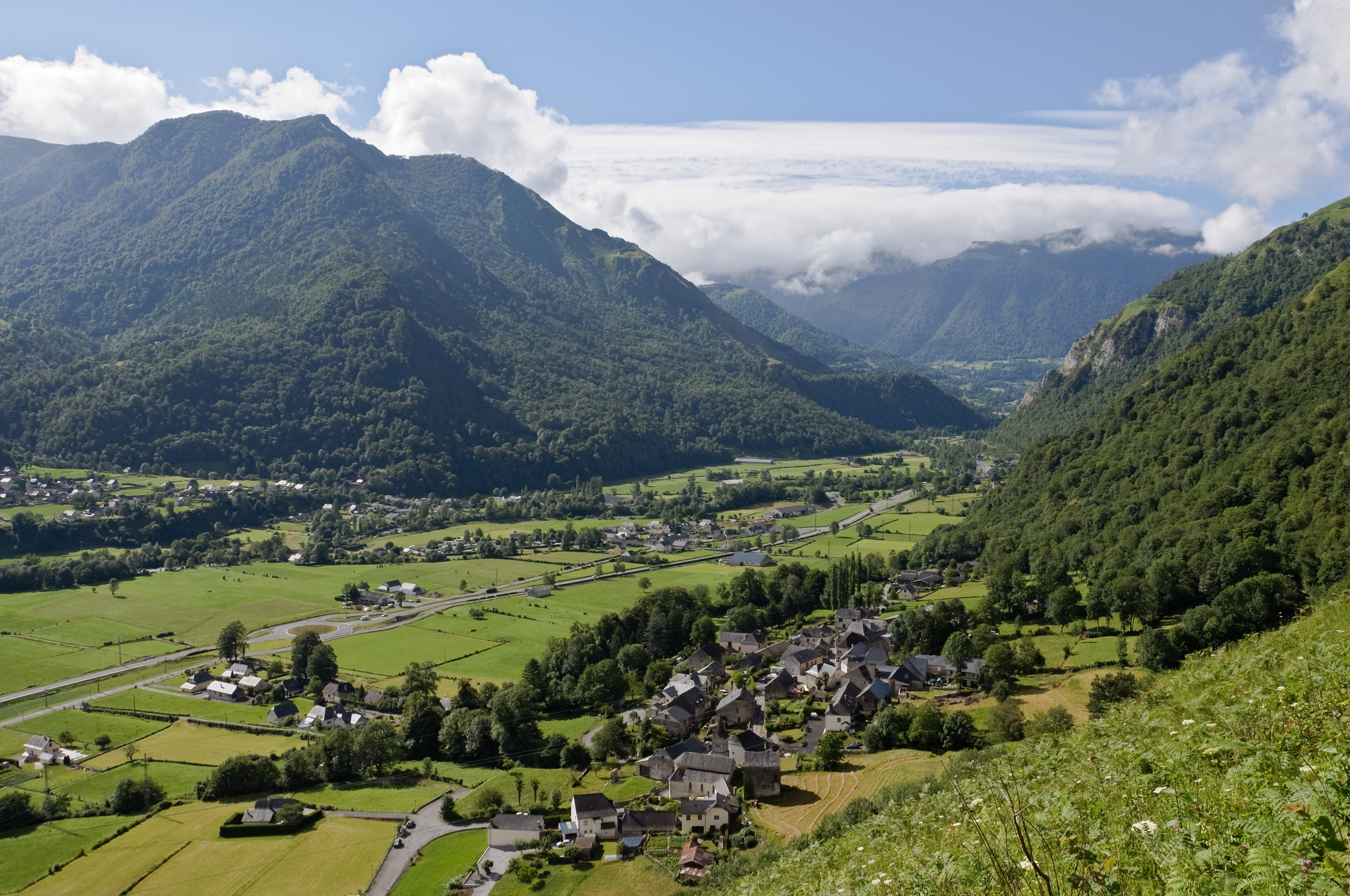
- The Ossau Valley at Aste-Béon
- Location of Aste-Béon
- Location within France Location within Nouvelle-Aquitaine
- Coordinates: 43°01′24″N 0°24′42″W
- Country: France
- Region: Nouvelle-Aquitaine
- Department: Pyrénées-Atlantiques
- Arrondissement: Oloron-Sainte-Marie
- Canton: Oloron-Sainte-Marie-2
- Intercommunality: CC Vallée d'Ossau

Government
  - Mayor (2020–2026): Michaël Dessein
- Area^{1}: 19.05 km^{2} (7.36 sq mi)
- Elevation: 530 m (1,740 ft)
- Highest elevation: 1,800 m (5,900 ft)
- Lowest elevation: 438 m (1,437 ft)
- Population (2023): 231
  - Density: 12.1/km^{2} (31.4/sq mi)
- Time zone: UTC+01:00 (CET)
  - Summer (DST): UTC+02:00 (CEST)
- INSEE/Postal code: 64069 /64260
- ^{1} French Land Register data, which excludes lakes, ponds, glaciers > 1 km^{2} (0.386 sq mi or 247 acres) and river estuaries.

Aste-Béon (French pronunciation: [ast beɔ̃]; Occitan: Asta e Bion) is a commune in the Pyrénées-Atlantiques department in the Nouvelle-Aquitaine region of south-western France.

== Geography ==
Aste-Béon is located in the heart of the Ossau Valley some 33 km south-east of Oloron-Sainte-Marie and 7 km north of Laruns. Access to the commune is by road D240 from Castet in the north passing south down the valley in the west of the commune through the village and continuing to Béost in the south. The D290 connects the village of Béon in the north-east to the D934 road which runs from north to south parallel to the commune's western border. Most of the commune is rugged mountains with substantial forests except for a narrow strip down the western side of the commune in the Ossau Valley where there is farmland.

The Gave d'Ossau forms most of the western border of the commune as it flows north down the Ossau Valley eventually joining the Gave d'Aspe at Oloron-Sainte-Marie. The Lamay river rises in the east of the commune and flows west to join the Gave d'Ossau just south of the village. The Arrigast flows into the Gave d'Ossau from the left bank forming the northern border of the commune on that side of the river.

=== Places and hamlets ===
- Grange l'Art
- Aste
- Béon
- Boala d'Aste
- Grange Borie
- Chiperne
- La Coumète
- Le Coutchet
- Dès (Barns)
- Le Génébra
- Grange Lavigne
- Lourziou
- Grange Loustalet
- Grange d'Ourdou
- Peyraube (Forest)
- Le Port d'Aste
- Le Port de Béon
- Pourteig
- Grange Salle
- Le Sarrat
- Serres
- Sers

== Toponymy ==
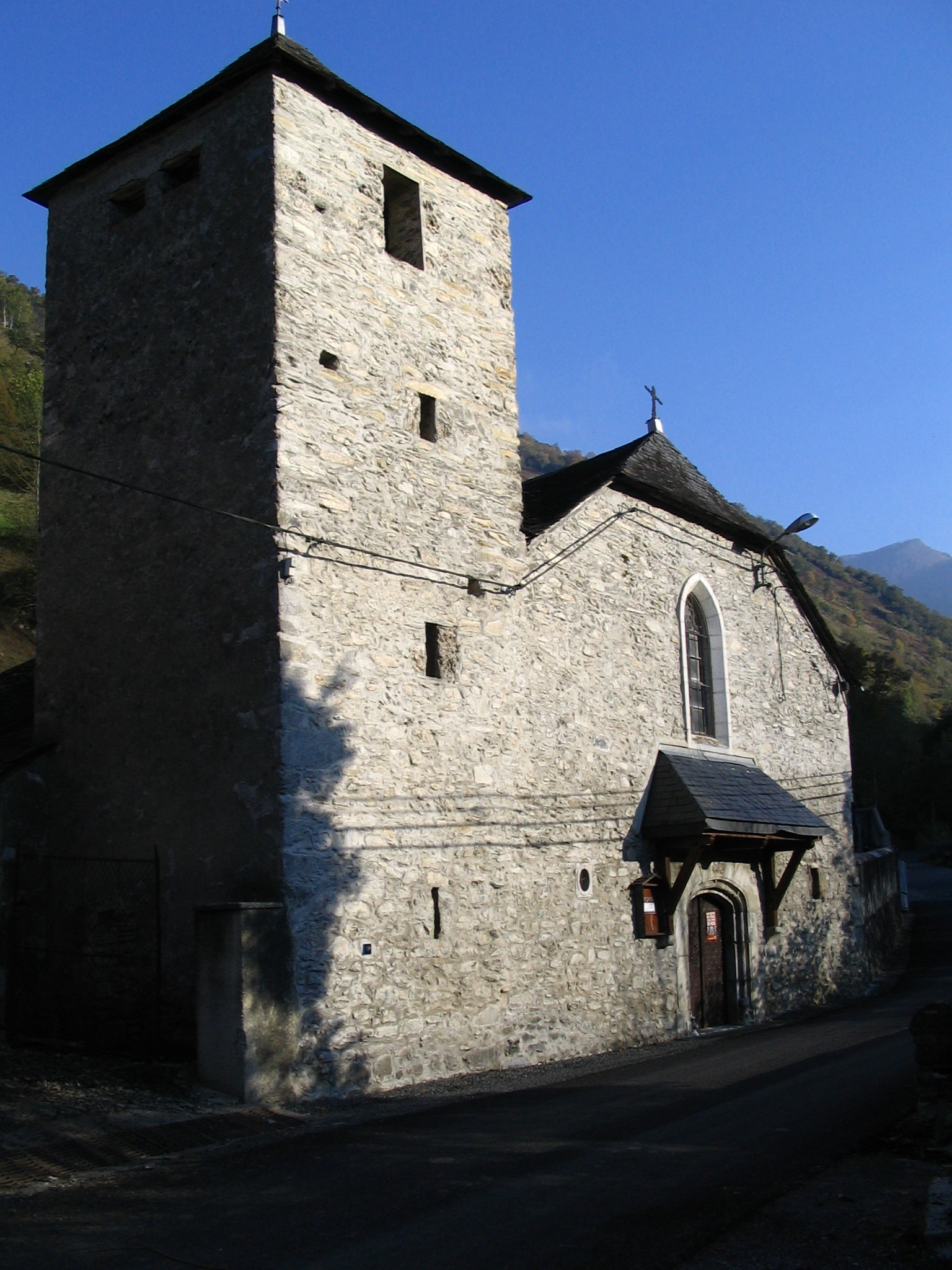
Church in Béon village

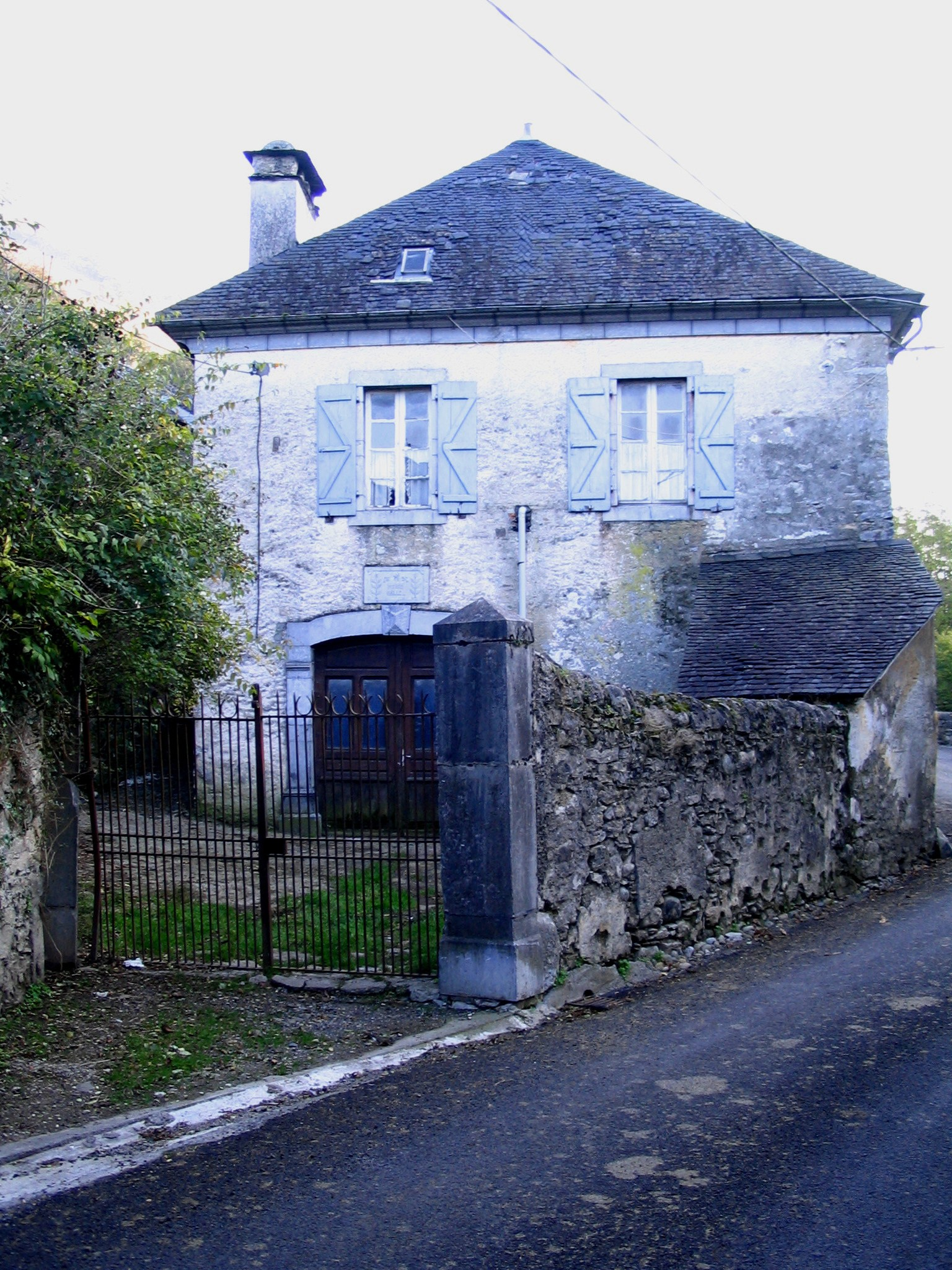
House in Béon village

The commune name in béarnais is Asta-Bion.

Michel Grosclaude said that the name Aste comes from the basque aitz/as ("rocky point"). He suggested that the name Béon comes from the pre-indo-European oronymic root *ben

The following table details the origins of the commune name and other names in the commune.

Name	Spelling	Date	Source	Page	Origin	Description
Aste	Aste	1385	Grosclaude		Census	Village
	Asta	1487	Raymond	16	Ossau	
Béon	Beoo	1328	Grosclaude		Val de Tena	Village
	Beoo	1374	Raymond	28	Luntz	
	Beoo	1385	Raymond	28	Census	
	Beo de la Bag d'Ossau	1427	Raymond	28	Carresse	
	Sent Felix de Béon	1654	Raymond	28	Insinuations	
	Béon	1750	Cassini		Cassini Map	
Le Port de Béon	Le parsan du Port	1756	Raymond	138	Denombremont	Hamlet

Sources:

- Raymond: Topographic Dictionary of the Department of Basses-Pyrenees, 1863, on the page numbers indicated in the table. (in French)
- Grosclaude: Toponymic Dictionary of communes, Béarn, 2006 (in French)
- Ossau: Notaries of Ossau
- Val de Tena: Treaty of Ossau - Val de Tena
- Luntz: Contracts of Luntz
- Carresse: Contracts of Carresse
- Insinuations: Insinuations of the Diocese of Oloron
- Denombrement: Denombremont of Aste
- Cassini Map: Cassini Map from 1750

== History ==
In 1385 Aste had 18 fires and depended on the bailiwick of Ossau. In the same year Béon also had 18 fires and belonged to the same bailiwick. The fief of Béon depended on the Viscounts of Béarn.

== Administration ==
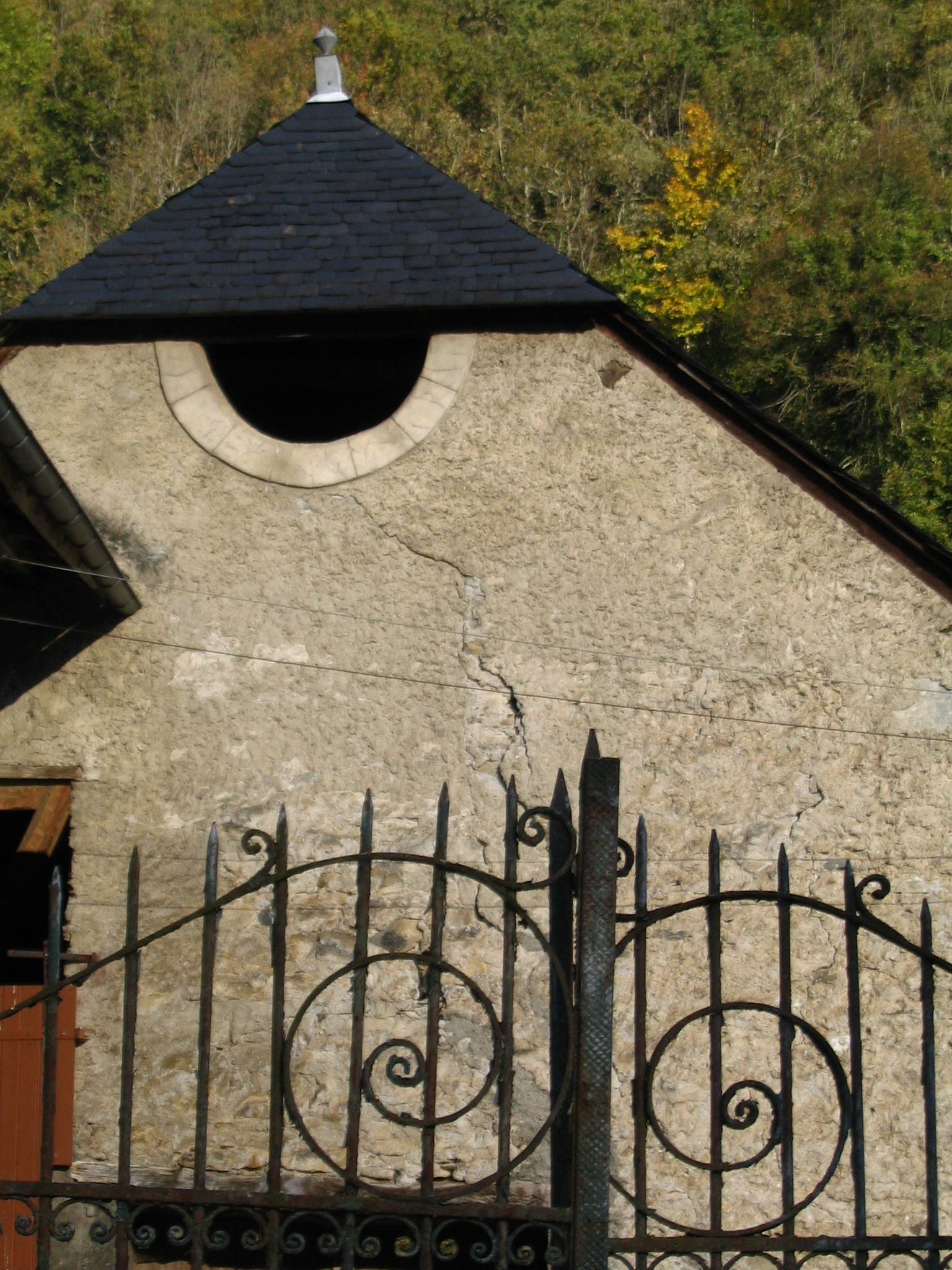
House in Aste-Béon village

List of Successive Mayors

From	To	Name	Party
1995	2001	Jean Vertut	
2001	2014	Augustin Médevielle	UMP
2014	2020	Jean-Michel Barrabourg	
2020	2026	Michaël Dessein	

=== Inter-communality ===
The commune is part of three inter-communal structures:

- the Communauté de communes de la Vallée d'Ossau;
- the SIVU for the construction of the Retirement home in Haut-Ossau;
- the joint association of Haut-Béarn;

The commune is part of the Pays d'Oloron et du Haut-Béarn.

== Demography ==
The inhabitants of the commune are known as Astois et Béonais or Astoises et Béonaises in French.

Historical population

Year	Pop.	±% p.a.
1793	473	—
1821	323	−1.35%
1846	597	+2.49%
1872	465	−0.96%
1901	400	−0.52%
1926	331	−0.75%
1946	271	−1.00%
1962	267	−0.09%
1968	235	−2.11%

Year	Pop.	±% p.a.
1975	196	−2.56%
1982	211	+1.06%
1990	159	−3.48%
1999	231	+4.24%
2007	262	+1.59%
2012	275	+0.97%
2017	237	−2.93%
2023	231	−0.43%

Source: EHESS and INSEE

== Economy ==
The economy of the commune has historically been orientated towards agriculture and livestock. The commune is part of the Appellation d'origine contrôlée (AOC) zone of Ossau-iraty.

In 1769, Jean-Joseph d'Augerot, Chief Justice of the Parliament of Navarre built a foundry in the Ossau Valley at Béon. The foundry used minerals from old mines located at Aste.

== Culture and heritage ==
=== Civil heritage ===
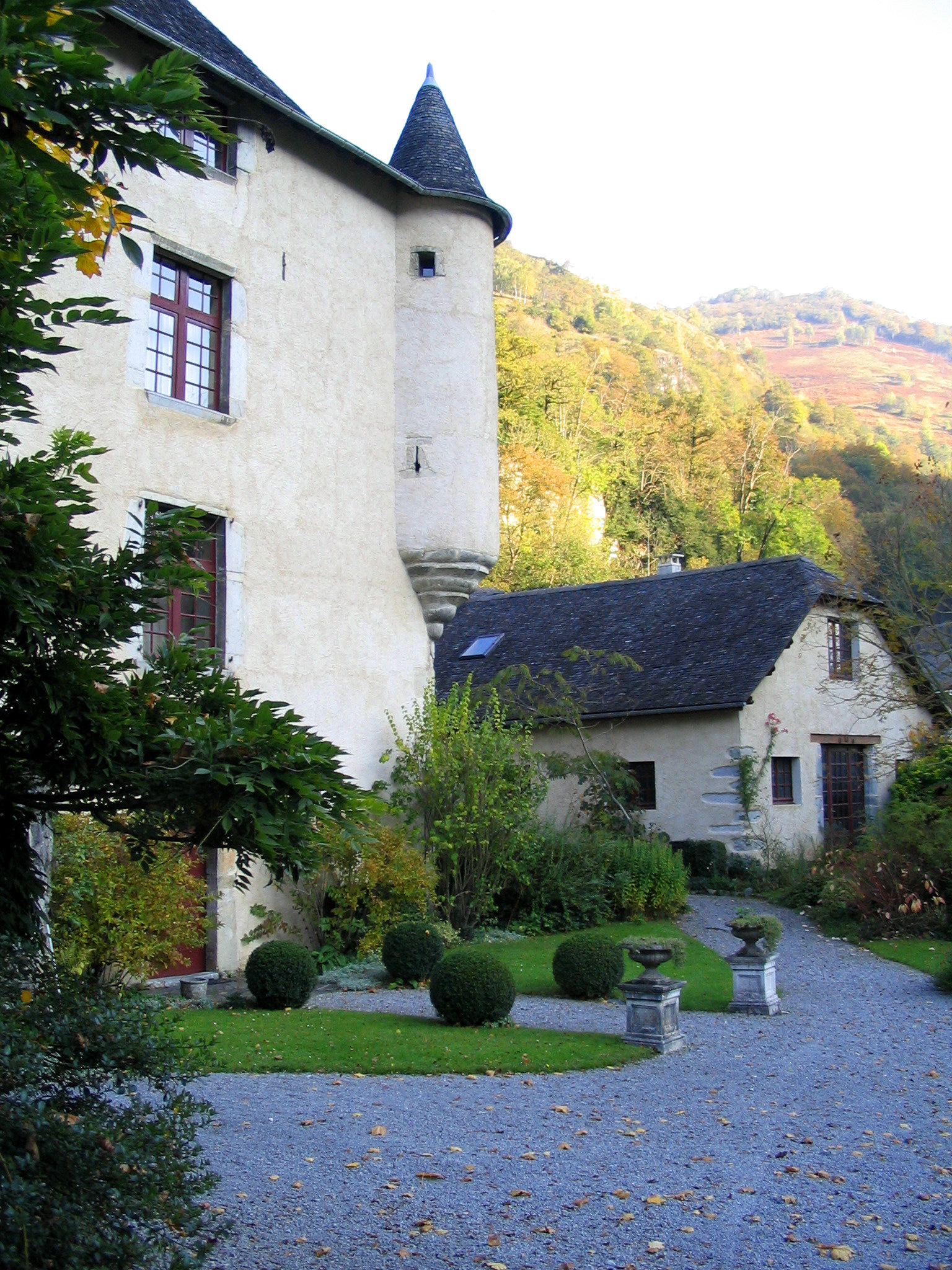
The Château of Béon

- The Château of Béon (14th century) was occupied until the 17th century when it was abandoned until the 1980s. It remained the property of the House of Béon for all its history until its slow extinction in the 19th century. It is registered as a historical monument and has been completely restored.

=== Religious heritage ===
The Church of Saint John the Baptist (19th century) at Aste is registered as a historical monument.

It contains a Chalice (1654) which is registered as a historical object.

=== Environmental heritage ===
A Natural reserve of nesting vultures was created by a Ministerial Decree of 11 December 1974 and is located across the territories of Aste-Béon, Bielle, Bilhères, and Castet. The museum which is associated with it, called La Falaise aux Vautours, is at the entrance to the village.

The Pène de Béon is 1,251 metres high.

The commune is traversed from north to south by the GR of Pays du tour de la vallée d'Ossau.

== See also ==
- Ossau Valley
- Communes of the Pyrénées-Atlantiques department

=== External links ===
- The Observatory of La Falaise aux Vautours website (in French)
- The foundry of Béon on the Fer et Savoir Faire website (in French)
- Aste-Béon on Géoportail, National Geographic Institute (IGN) website (in French)
- Aste and Beon on the 1750 Cassini Map
