= Laruns =

- Commune
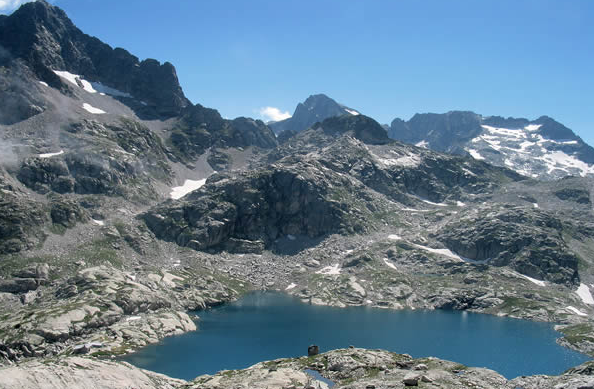
- Arrémoulit Lakes

- Coat of arms
- Location of Laruns
- Location within France Location within Nouvelle-Aquitaine
- Coordinates: 42°58′59″N 0°24′58″W
- Country: France
- Region: Nouvelle-Aquitaine
- Department: Pyrénées-Atlantiques
- Arrondissement: Oloron-Sainte-Marie
- Canton: Oloron-Sainte-Marie-2
- Intercommunality: Vallée d'Ossau

Government
  - Mayor (2020–2026): Robert Casadebaig
- Area^{1}: 248.96 km^{2} (96.12 sq mi)
- Elevation: 536 m (1,759 ft)
- Highest elevation: 2,973 m (9,754 ft)
- Lowest elevation: 458 m (1,503 ft)
- Population (2023): 1,177
  - Density: 4.728/km^{2} (12.24/sq mi)
- Time zone: UTC+01:00 (CET)
  - Summer (DST): UTC+02:00 (CEST)
- INSEE/Postal code: 64320 /64440
- ^{1} French Land Register data, which excludes lakes, ponds, glaciers > 1 km^{2} (0.386 sq mi or 247 acres) and river estuaries.

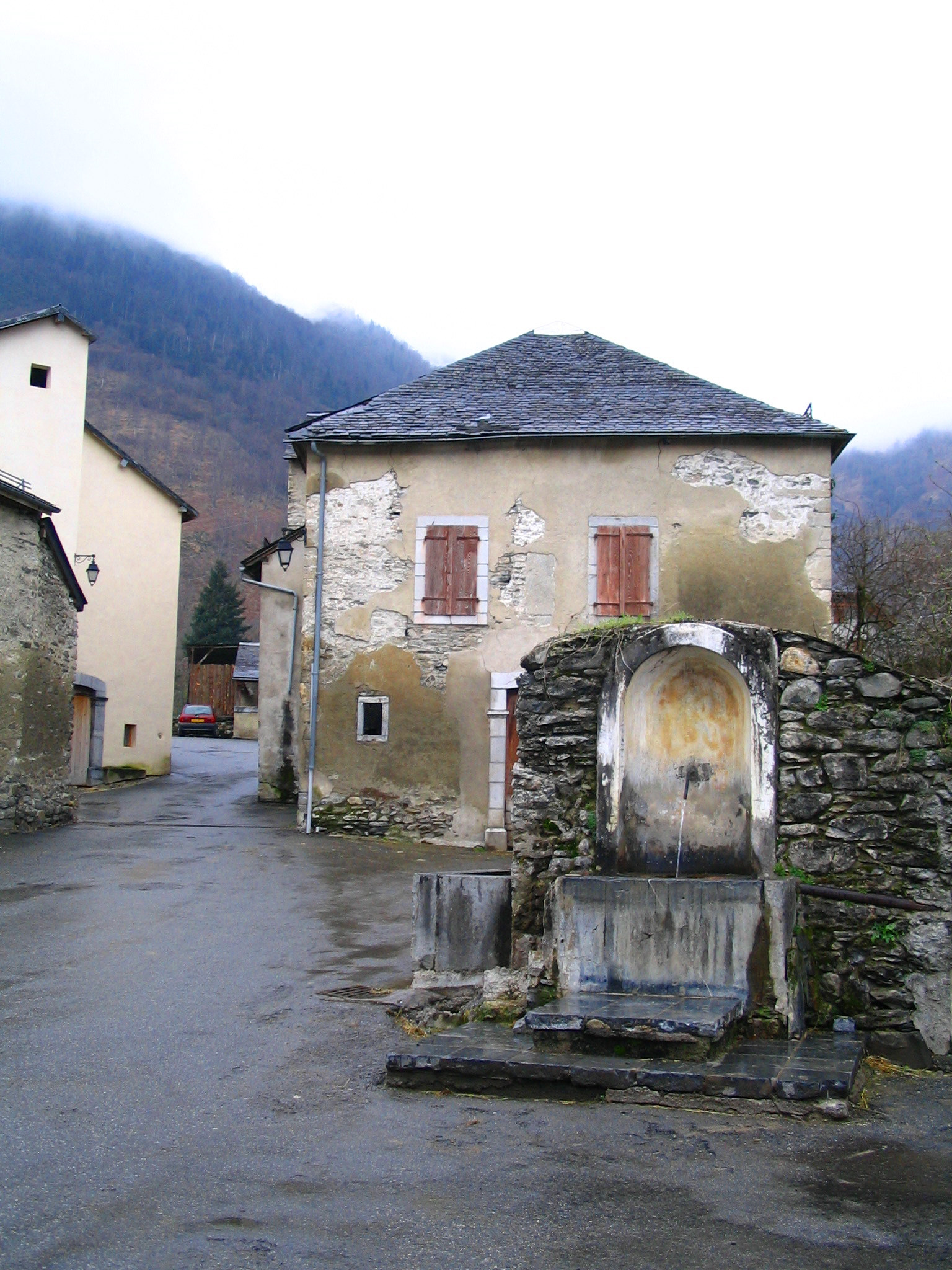
Street in Laruns

Laruns (French pronunciation: [laʁœ̃s]; Occitan: Laruntz) is a commune in the Pyrénées-Atlantiques department in south-western France.

It is situated at the confluence of two mountain streams, the Gave d'Ossau and its tributary, the Valentin.

Formerly part of the province of Béarn, Laruns is now within the département of Pyrénées-Atlantiques, itself in France's Nouvelle-Aquitaine région. It forms part of the arrondissement of Oloron-Sainte-Marie, and of the canton of Oloron-Sainte-Marie-2.

== Geography ==
Laruns is geographically the third-largest commune in metropolitan France, after Arles and Saintes-Maries-de-la-Mer. It includes a large area of upland, around and between the Gave d'Ossau and its tributaries, stretching as far as the border with Spain at the Col du Pourtalet, 30 km (19 mi) to the south of the village of Laruns.

The principal artery of communications through the commune is the D934 road, which runs south from the town of Pau, 40 km (25 mi) to the north, to the Col du Pourtalet. The D918 road branches off the D934 in Laruns village, and follows the Valentin before crossing the Col d'Aubisque to Argelès-Gazost in the next major valley to the east. There are no direct roads westward from Laruns.

Because of its large geographic size, Laruns contains several recognisably distinct communities in addition to Laruns itself. These include:

- Pon, an area of Laruns
- Espalungue, an area of Laruns
- Gêtre, an area of Laruns
- Gabas, a hamlet below the Pic du Midi d'Ossau, and where the valley road is crossed by the GR10 long-distance footpath that runs the length of the Pyrenees
- Geteu, a former commune merged into Laruns in 1828
- Goust, on a small plateau above Laruns
- Eaux-Chaudes, a spa situated at the southern entrance to the Gorge du Hourat
- Artouste-Fabrèges, a ski resort situated in the valley of the Gave du Brousset, and the beginning of the summer scenic route to the Lac d'Artouste via the Petit train d'Artouste
- Miegebat

Neighboring communes and municipalities:

- North: Gère-Bélesten and Aste-Béon
- East: Arrens-Marsous (Hautes-Pyrénées), Louvie-Soubiron, Béost and Eaux-Bonnes
- West: Aydius, Bedous, Cette-Eygun, Etsaut and Urdos
- South: Sallent de Gállego (Huesca, Spain).

== See also ==
- Ossau Valley
- Communes of the Pyrénées-Atlantiques department
