= Eaux-Chaudes =

Coordinates: 42.953862°N 0.439342°W

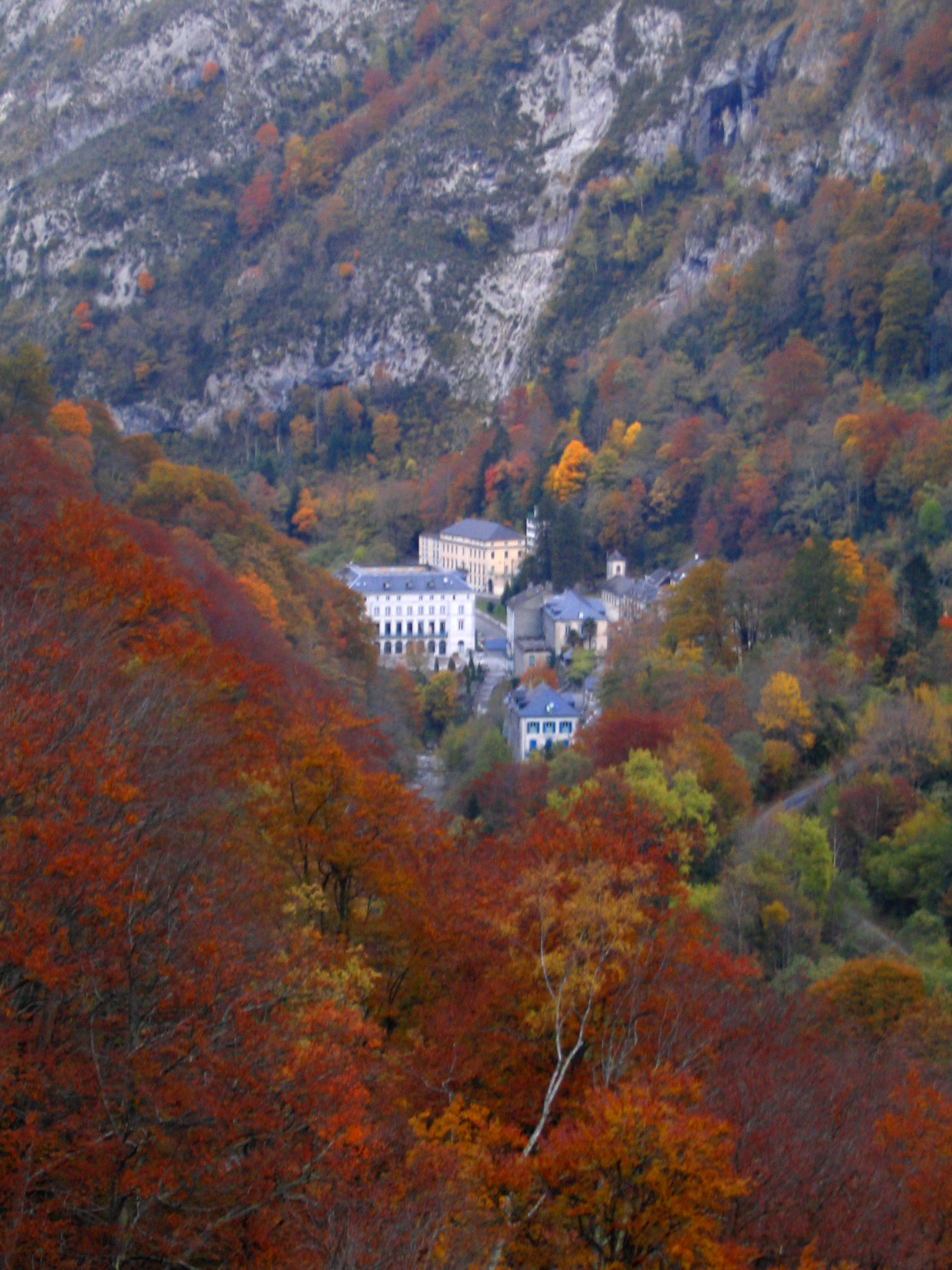
View of Eaux-Chaudes.

Eaux-Chaudes (French pronunciation: [o ʃod]) is a spa in the valley of the Gave d'Ossau in the French Pyrenees.

== Location ==
The village is located beside the river, at the southern entrance to the Gorge du Hourat. It is separated from the spa town of Eaux-Bonnes by the Massif du Gourzy.

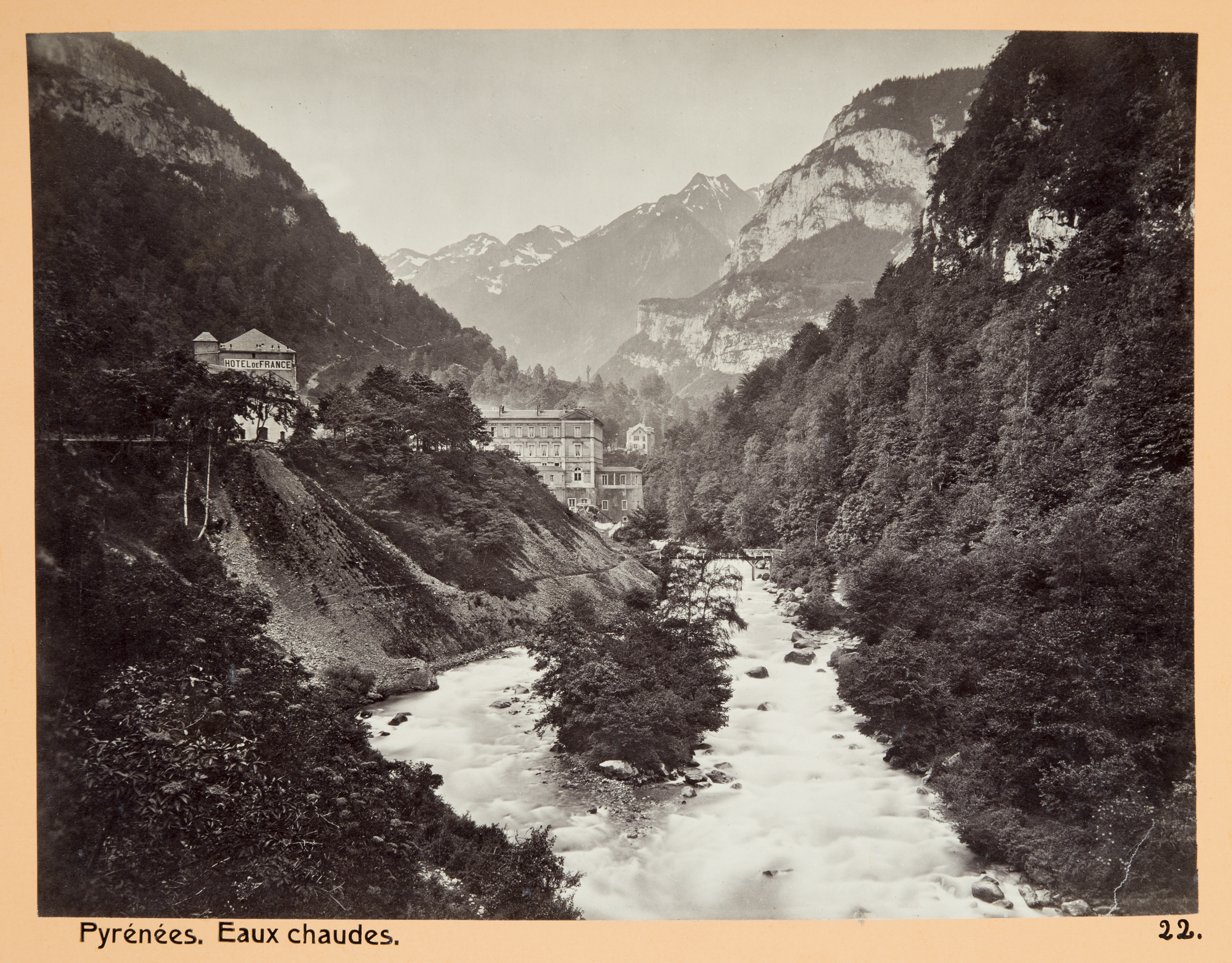
Eaux-Chaudes circa 1886

Politically, Eaux-Chaudes forms part of the commune of Laruns in the département of Pyrénées-Atlantiques. The actual village of Laruns is some 4 km (2.5 mi) to the north on the D934.

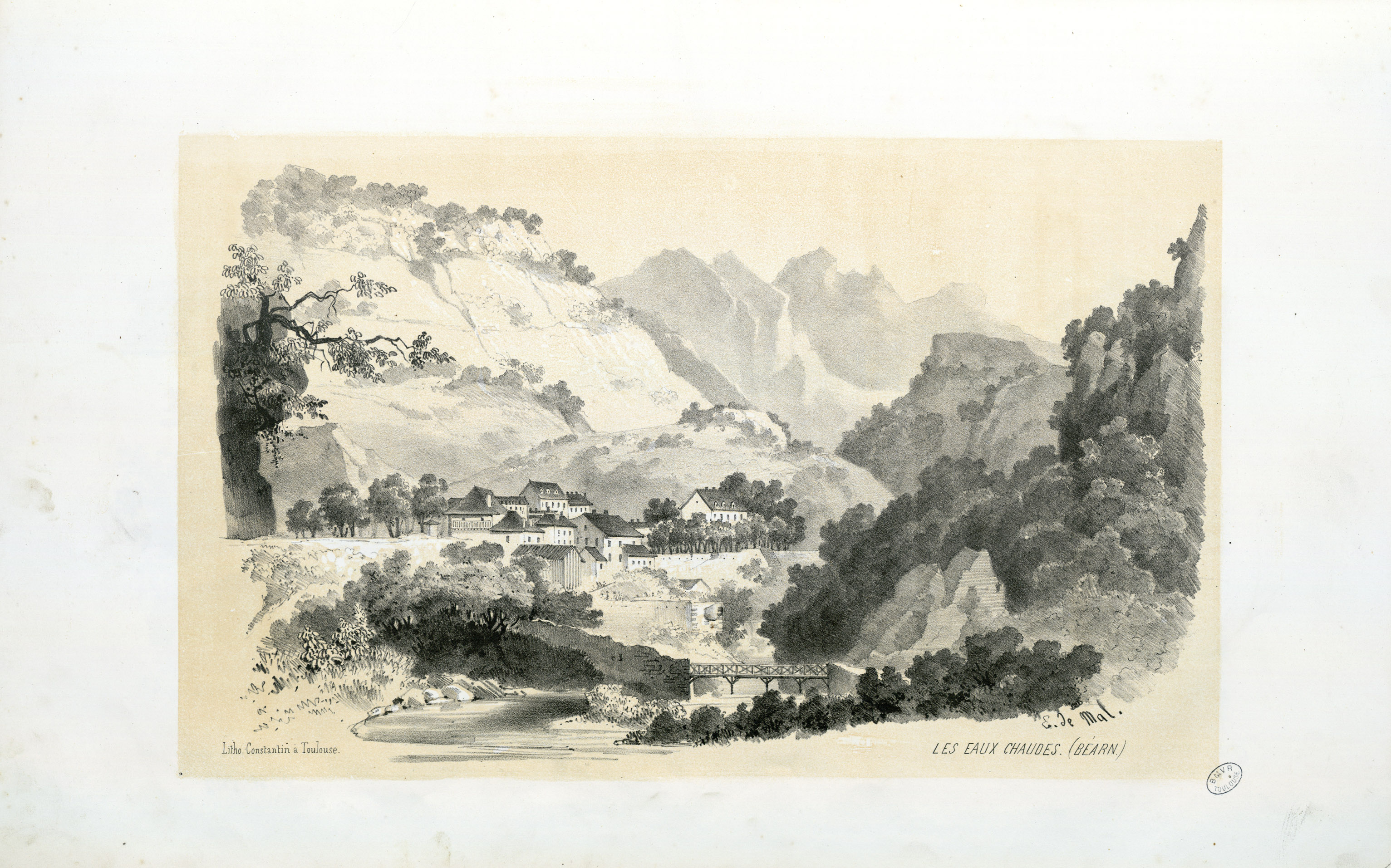
Les Eaux Chaudes (Béarn) by Eugène de Malbos, in 1843
