= Gave d'Ossau =

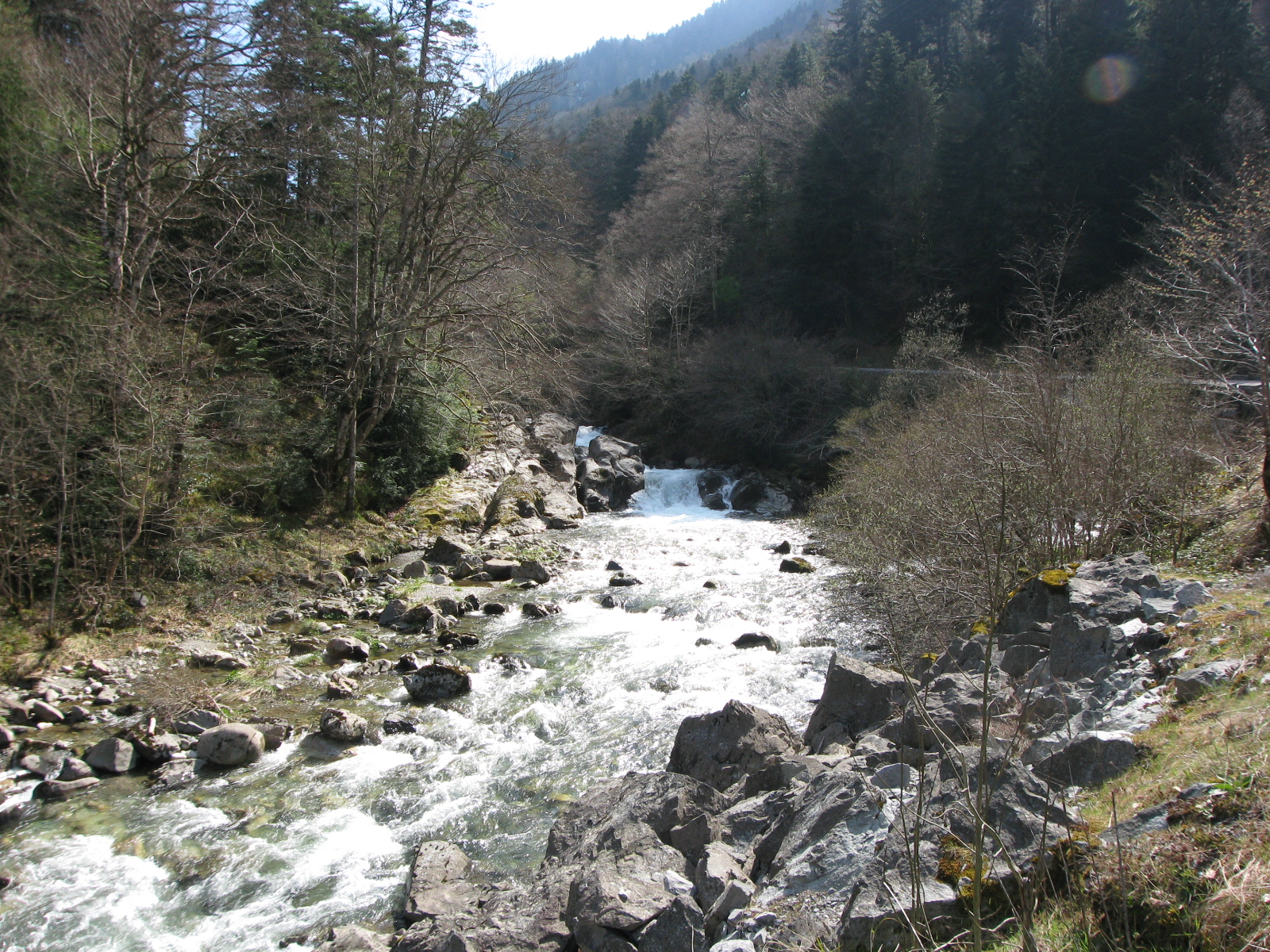
- The Gave d'Ossau near Eaux-Chaudes

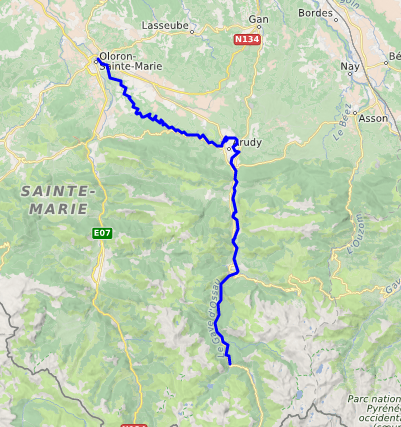

Location
- Country: France

Physical characteristics
- Source
  - location: Pic du Midi d'Ossau
  - elevation: 1,008 m (3,307 ft)
- Mouth
  - location: Gave d'Oloron
  - coordinates: 43°11′41″N 0°36′28″W
- Length: 48.5 km (30.1 mi)

Basin features
- Progression: Gave d'Oloron→ Gaves réunis→ Adour→ Atlantic Ocean

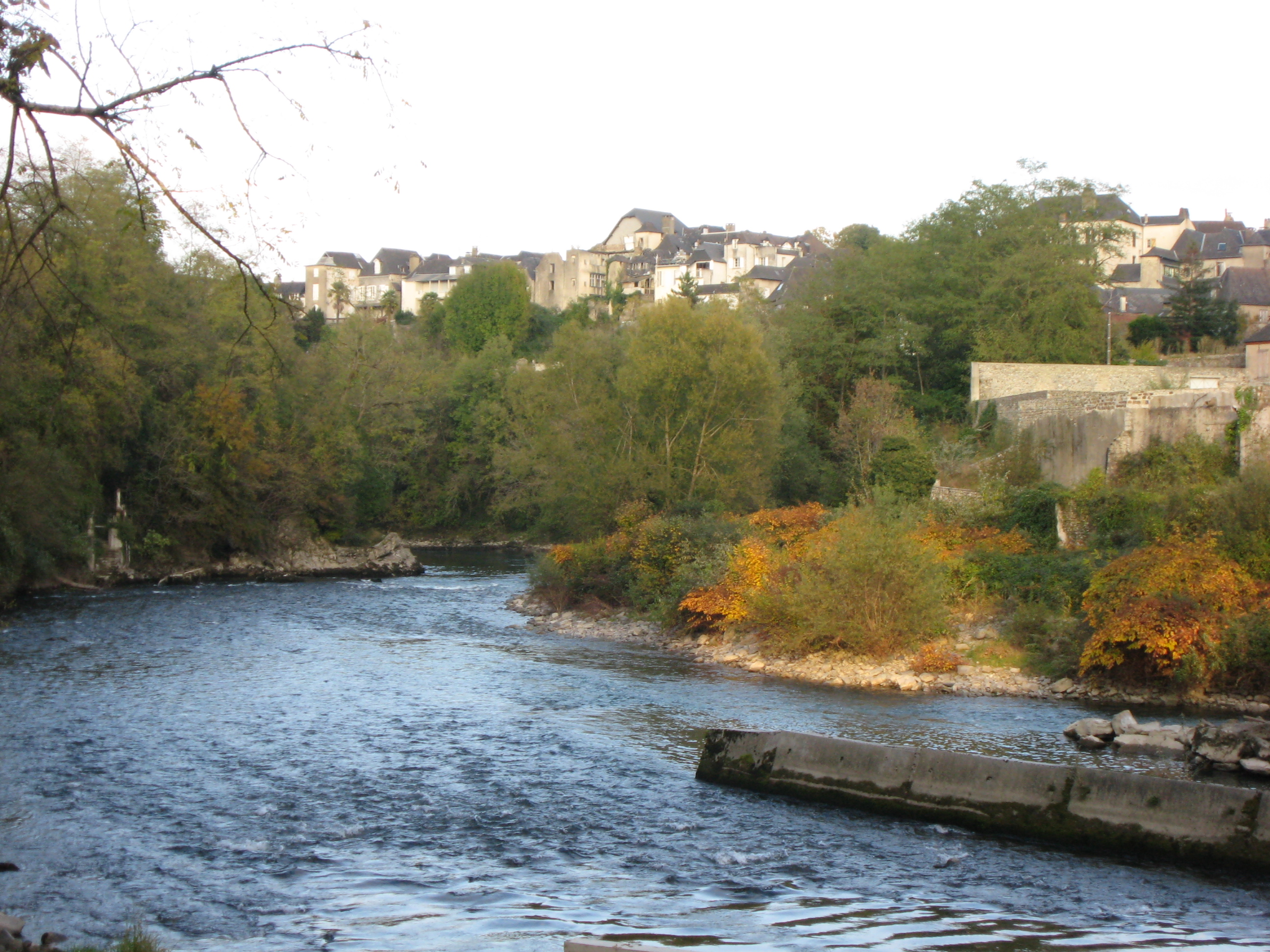
The Gave d'Ossau and the Gave d'Aspe meet to form the Gave d'Oloron.

The Gave d'Ossau (French pronunciation: [ɡav dɔso]) is the torrential river flowing through the Ossau Valley, one of the three main valleys of the High-Béarn (Pyrénées-Atlantiques), in the Southwest of France.

It is formed in Gabas from the confluence of two gaves coming from both sides of the Pic du Midi d'Ossau:

- the Gave de Bious, from the Pic d'Astu (west)
- the Gave du Brousset, from the Anéou Circus (east).

After joining the Gave d'Aspe, in Oloron-Sainte-Marie, it forms the Gave d'Oloron. It is considered the upper course of the Gave d'Oloron by Sandre.

Throughout its length, the river is paralleled by the D934 road that runs from Pau to Spain, via the Col du Pourtalet.

In Castet, a dam forms the Lac de Castet.

== Main tributaries ==
- (R) Gave de Soussouéou
- (L) Gée from the Coig Arras, in the Gorges du Bitet
- (R) Valentin, from Gourette
  - (R) Cély, from the Col d'Aubisque
- (L) l'Arrioutort, in Laruns
- (R) Canceigt.
- (R) Sourde, in Aste.
- (L) Arriou Mage, in Bielle.
- (R) Lau.

== Départements and towns ==
- Pyrénées-Atlantiques: Gabas, Eaux-Chaudes, Laruns, Béost, Aste-Béon, Gère-Bélesten, Bielle, Castet, Louvie-Juzon, Izeste, Arudy, Oloron-Sainte-Marie.
