= Castet =

- Commune
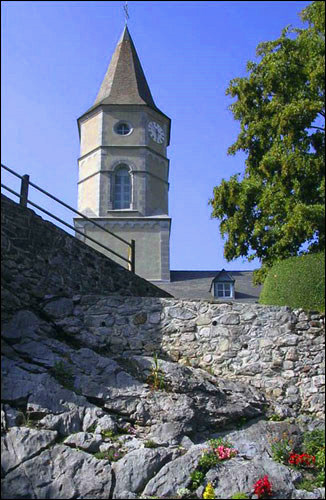
- Church
- Location of Castet
- Location within France Location within Nouvelle-Aquitaine
- Coordinates: 43°04′12″N 0°24′57″W
- Country: France
- Region: Nouvelle-Aquitaine
- Department: Pyrénées-Atlantiques
- Arrondissement: Oloron-Sainte-Marie
- Canton: Oloron-Sainte-Marie-2
- Intercommunality: Vallée d'Ossau

Government
  - Mayor (2023–2026): Robert Daguerre
- Area^{1}: 23.53 km^{2} (9.08 sq mi)
- Elevation: 493 m (1,617 ft)
- Highest elevation: 2,020 m (6,630 ft)
- Lowest elevation: 419 m (1,375 ft)
- Population (2023): 136
  - Density: 5.78/km^{2} (15.0/sq mi)
- Time zone: UTC+01:00 (CET)
  - Summer (DST): UTC+02:00 (CEST)
- INSEE/Postal code: 64175 /64260
- ^{1} French Land Register data, which excludes lakes, ponds, glaciers > 1 km^{2} (0.386 sq mi or 247 acres) and river estuaries.

Castet (French pronunciation: [kastɛt]; Gascon: Castèth) is a commune in the Pyrénées-Atlantiques department in south-western France. It lies on the river Gave d'Ossau, in the Ossau Valley. The Lac de Castet is an artificial lake in Castet, created by a dam in the Gave d'Ossau.

== See also ==
- Communes of the Pyrénées-Atlantiques department
