= Gabas, Pyrénées-Atlantiques =

Coordinates: 42.889764°N 0.427858°W

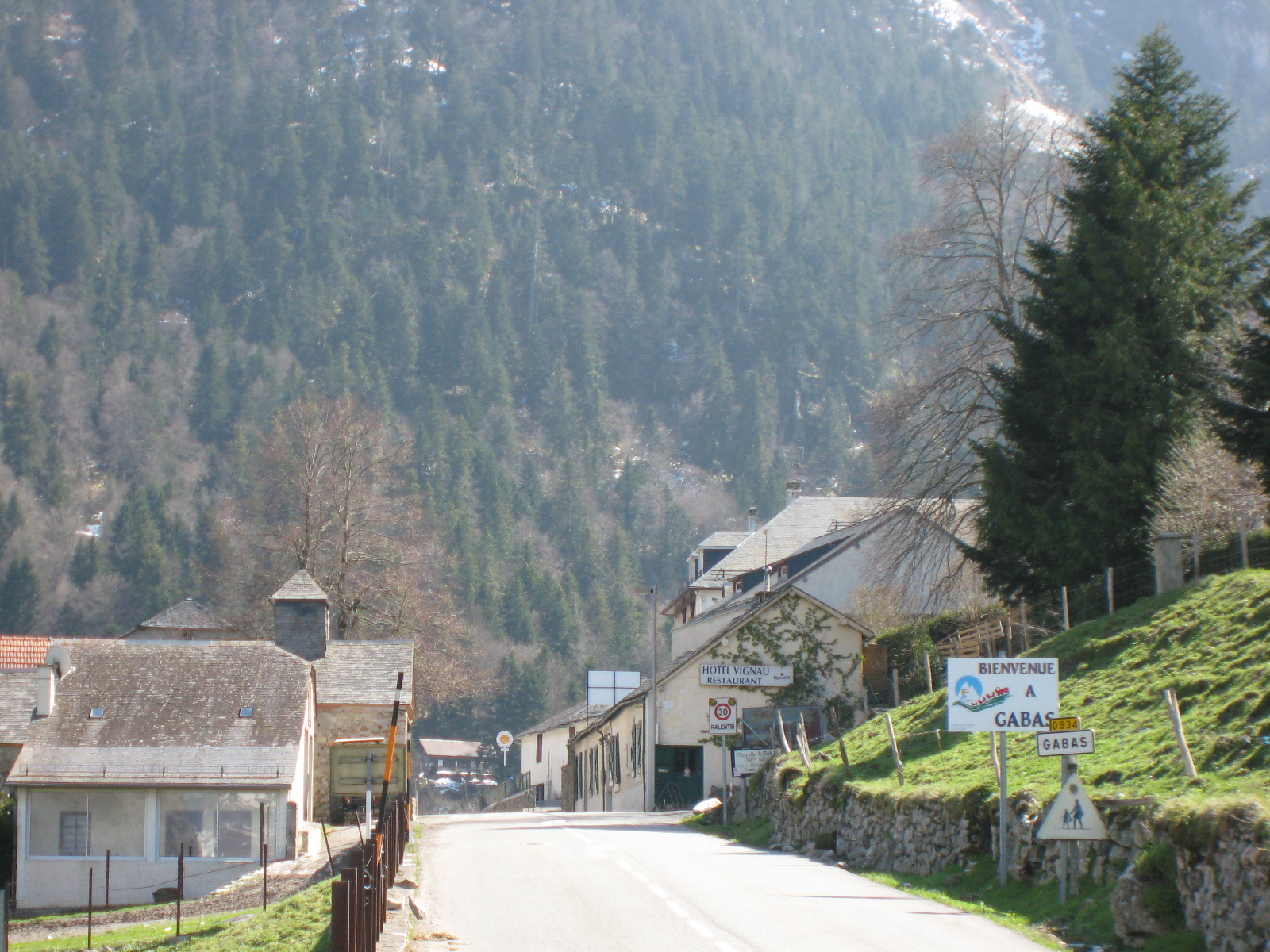
The hamlet of Gabas

Gabas is a hamlet in the valley of the Gave d'Ossau in the French Pyrenees. It is located where that river is formed by the confluence of two mountain streams, the Gave de Bious and the Gave du Brousset, which flow respectively from the western and eastern sides of the Pic du Midi d'Ossau.

The hamlet is on the D934 road that runs from Pau to Spain, via the Col du Pourtalet, at the point where it is crossed by the GR10 long distance footpath that runs the length of the Pyrenees. Because of this location, Gabas has become a tourist gateway with an importance beyond its size. It is the site of an information centre of the Pyrenees National Park, a mountain ecology centre, a mountain refuge and several hotels.

Politically, Gabas forms part of the commune of Laruns in the département of Pyrénées-Atlantiques. The actual village of Laruns is some 13 km (8.1 mi) to the north of Gabas on the D934.
