= Lac de Castet =

Reservoir in Pyrénées-Atlantiques, France

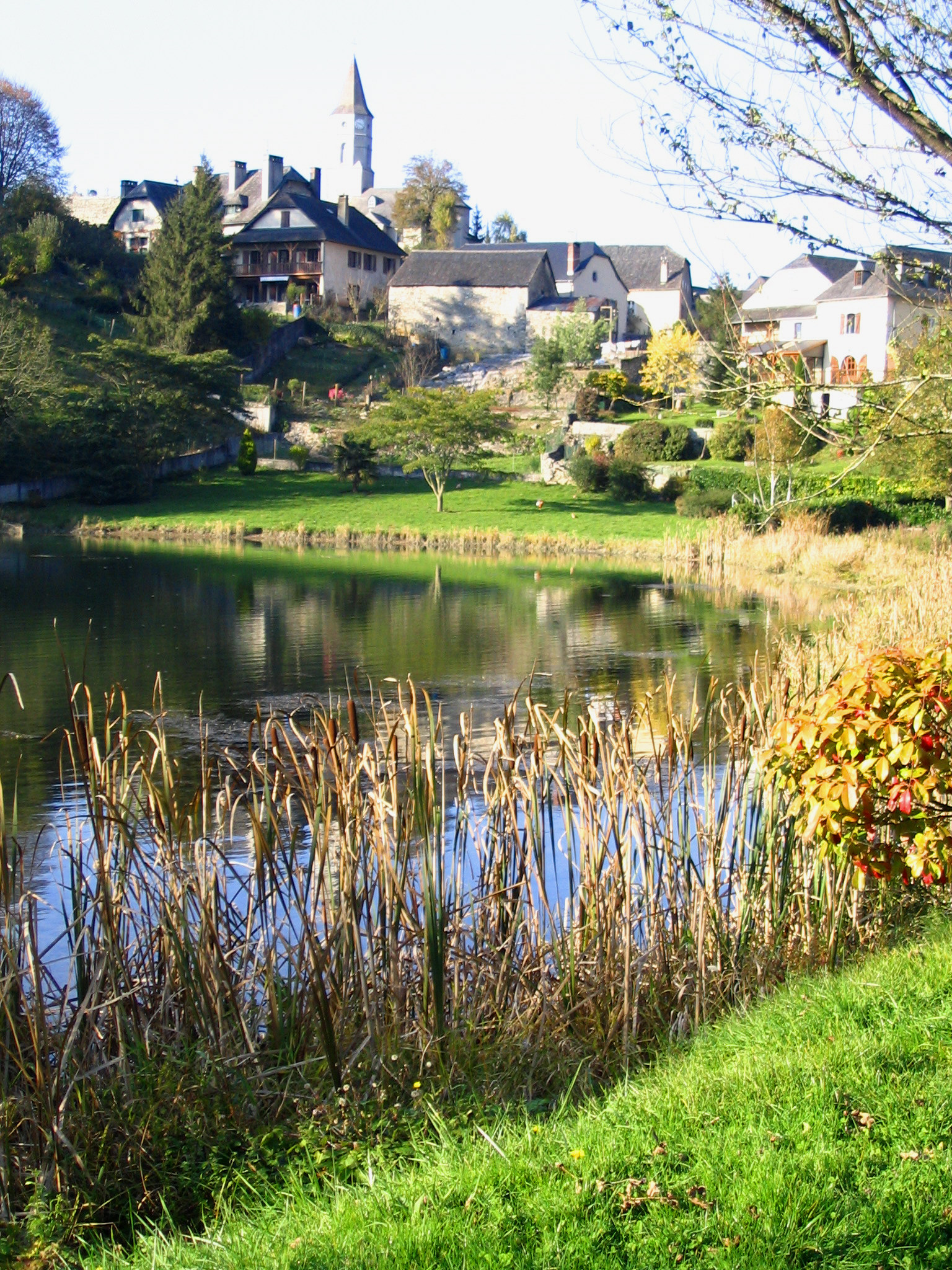

- Location within Pyrenees
- Location: Pyrénées, Pyrénées-Atlantiques
- Coordinates: 43°4′17″N 0°25′8″W
- Type: reservoir
- Primary inflows: Gave d'Ossau
- Basin countries: France
- Max. length: 1.2 km (0.75 mi)
- Max. width: 0.44 km (0.27 mi)
- Surface area: 0.4 km^{2} (0.15 mi^{2})
- Surface elevation: 423 m (1,388 ft)
- Islands: numerous islets

Lac de Castet is a lake in Pyrénées, Pyrénées-Atlantiques, France. At an elevation of 423 m, its surface area is 0.4 km².
