= Pic du Midi d'Ossau =

Mountain in the French Pyrenees

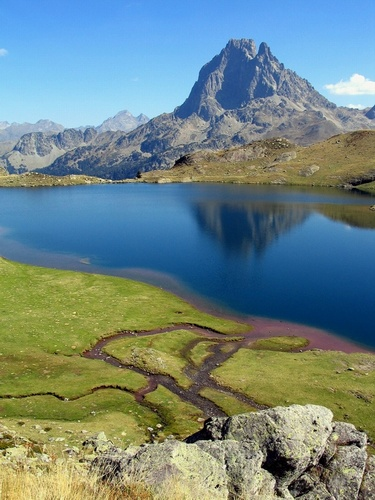
- Pic du Midi d'Ossau

Highest point
- Elevation: 2,884 m (9,462 ft)
- Prominence: 1,089 m (3,573 ft)
- Listing: Ribu
- Coordinates: 42°50′35″N 0°26′17″W

Geography
- Location within Pyrenees
- Location: Pyrénées-Atlantiques, France
- Parent range: Pyrenees

The Pic du Midi d'Ossau (French pronunciation: [pik dy midi dɔso]; Occitan: Pic de Mieidia d'Aussau; 2,884 m) is a mountain rising above the Ossau Valley in the French Pyrenees. Despite possessing neither a glacier nor, in the context of the range, a particularly high summit, its distinctive shape makes it a symbol of the French side of the Pyrenees. This familiar shape also makes it easily recognisable from afar, and it is particularly distinctive from the Boulevard des Pyrénées in Pau, some 55 km to the north.

== Appearance ==
As normally seen from the north, the mountain presents itself as having two distinct peaks, although from the south two other summits are also visible. It stands separate from any surrounding peaks, being largely surrounded by the valleys of the Gave de Bious, to the west, and the Gave du Brousset, to the east. These two mountain streams come together in the hamlet of Gabas at the foot of the mountain's northern slopes, to form the Gave d'Ossau.

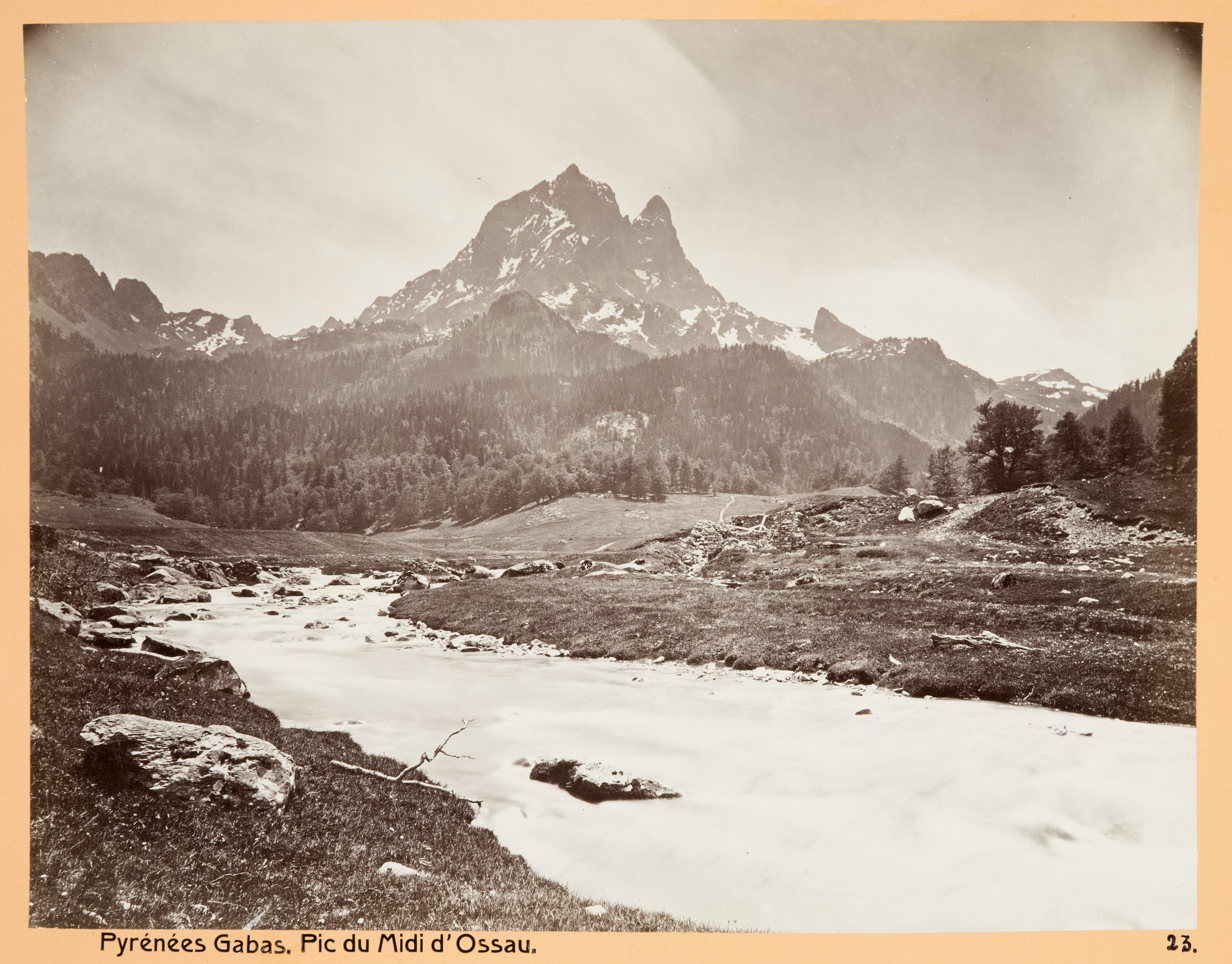
Pic du Midi d´Ossau, c. 1886

The Pic du Midi d'Ossau was reputedly first climbed in 1552 by an expedition led by François de Foix-Candale, later to become the Bishop of Aire. Although the success of this first climb is disputed, it is known that the mountain had been successfully climbed by 1787 when a military surveyor noted that a triangulation cairn had been built on the summit. The first fully recorded climb was by Guillaume Delfau accompanied by Mathieu (an Eaux-Bonnes shepherd) on October 2, 1797.

The mountain offers many routes of ascent; the voie normale is a serious scramble and rock climb with a grading of PD, II+, 550 m. It approaches the summit via the Refuge de Pombie, a Club Alpin Francais owned mountain hut situated at 2,031 m (6,663 ft), and requires most of a day to execute.

Politically, the mountain lies within the commune of Laruns, in the département of Pyrénées-Atlantiques and the Aquitaine region of France. It lies within the fully protected area of the Pyrenees National Park. The mountain was the subject of the 1854 landscape painting View of the Pic du Midi d'Ossau in the Pyrenees by the British romantic artist Clarkson Stanfield.
