= Lac de Fabrèges =

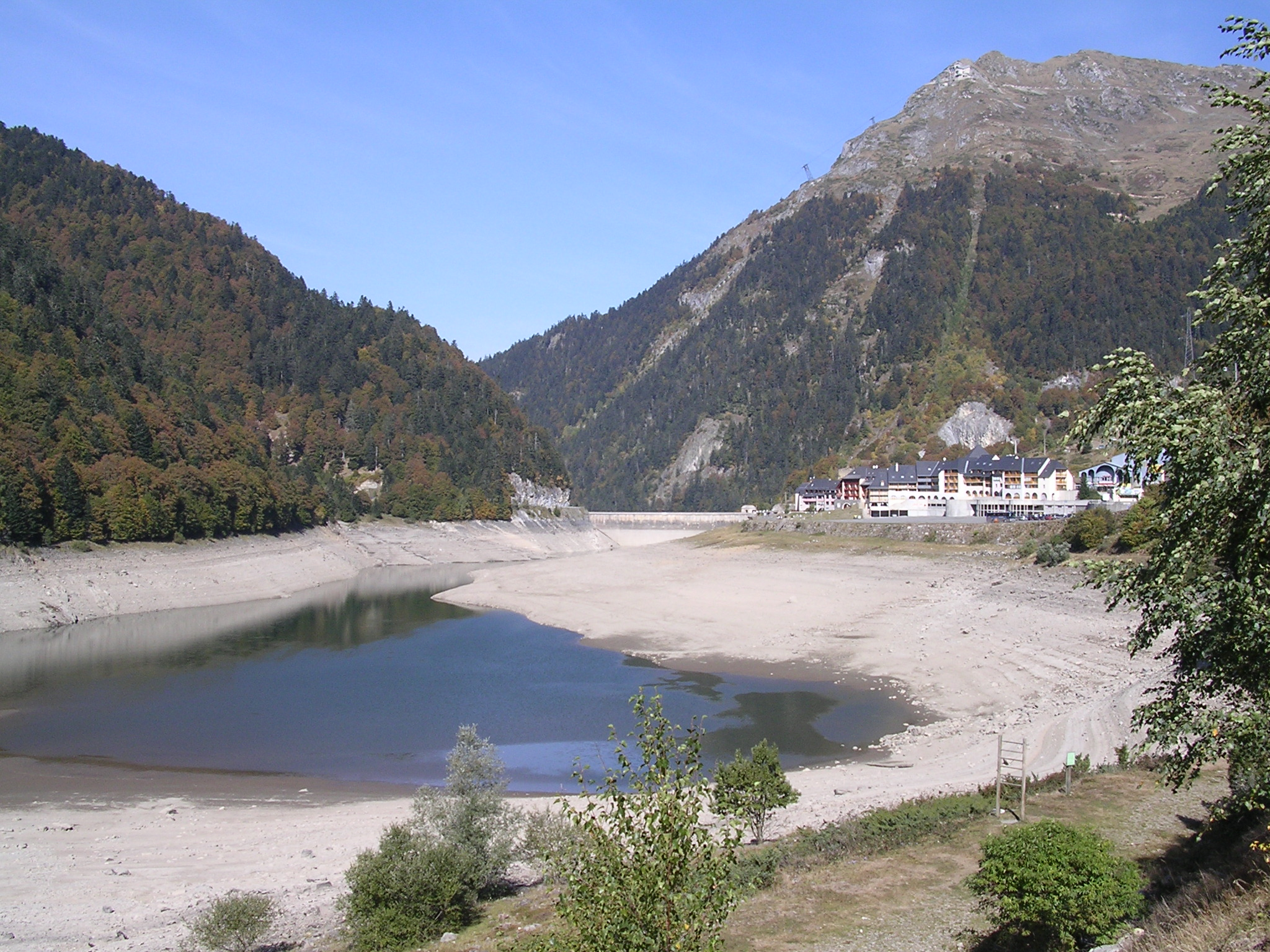

- Location within Pyrenees
- Location: Pyrénées-Atlantiques
- Coordinates: 42.88319°N 0.40241°W
- Type: reservoir
- Catchment area: 60 km^{2} (23 sq mi)
- Basin countries: France
- Surface area: 0.54 km^{2} (0.21 sq mi)
- Max. depth: 54 m (177 ft)
- Surface elevation: 1,241 m (4,072 ft)

Lac de Fabrèges is a lake in Pyrénées-Atlantiques, France. At an elevation of 1241 m, its surface area is 0.54 km^{2}.
