= Bielle =

- Commune
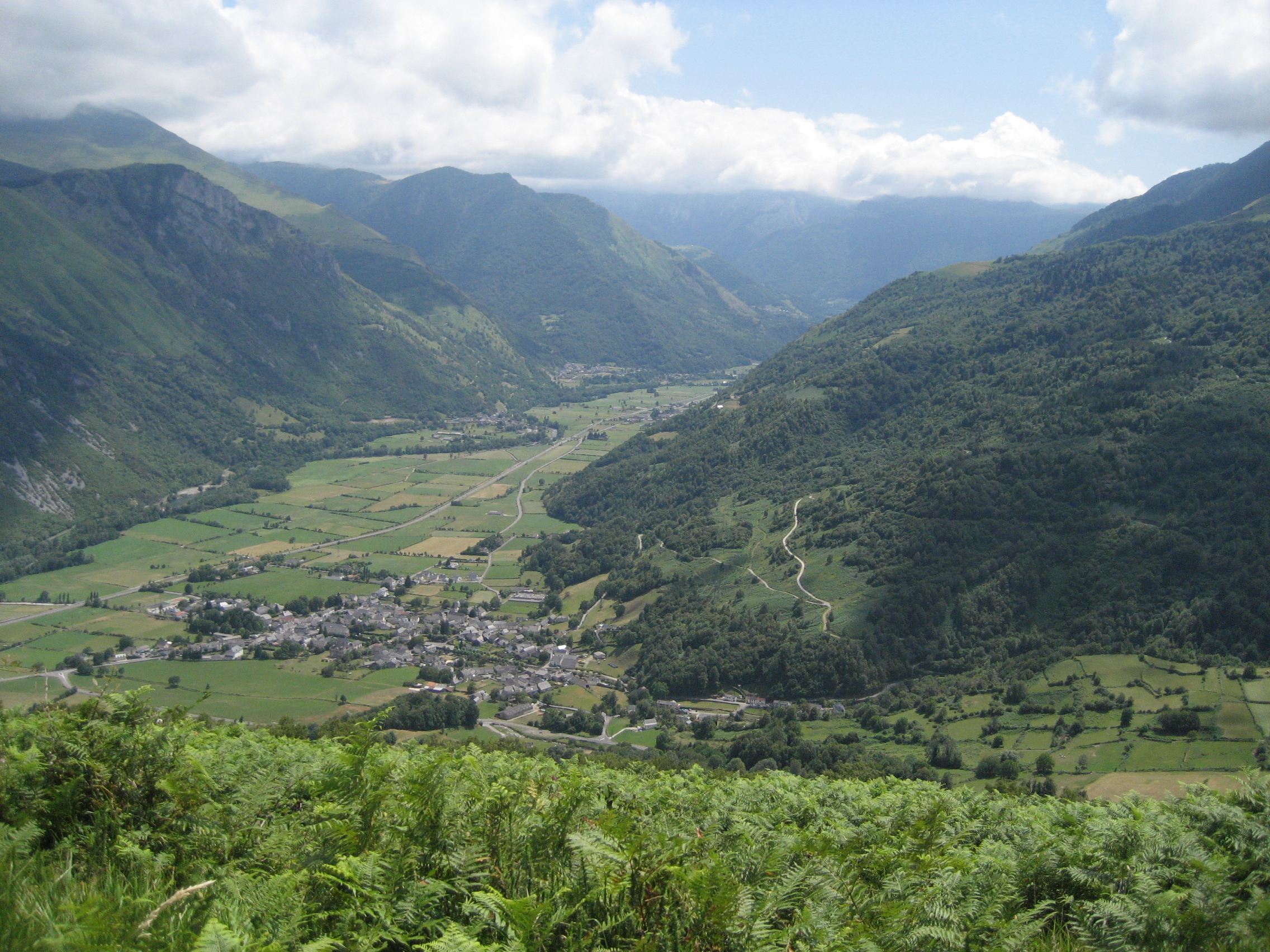
- A general view of Bielle
- Location of Bielle
- Location within France Location within Nouvelle-Aquitaine
- Coordinates: 43°03′19″N 0°25′52″W
- Country: France
- Region: Nouvelle-Aquitaine
- Department: Pyrénées-Atlantiques
- Arrondissement: Oloron-Sainte-Marie
- Canton: Oloron-Sainte-Marie-2
- Intercommunality: Vallée d'Ossau

Government
  - Mayor (2020–2026): Jean Montoulieu
- Area^{1}: 25.37 km^{2} (9.80 sq mi)
- Elevation: 450 m (1,480 ft)
- Highest elevation: 1,973 m (6,473 ft)
- Lowest elevation: 420 m (1,380 ft)
- Population (2023): 371
  - Density: 14.6/km^{2} (37.9/sq mi)
- Time zone: UTC+01:00 (CET)
  - Summer (DST): UTC+02:00 (CEST)
- INSEE/Postal code: 64127 /64260
- ^{1} French Land Register data, which excludes lakes, ponds, glaciers > 1 km^{2} (0.386 sq mi or 247 acres) and river estuaries.

Bielle (French pronunciation: [bjɛl]; Occitan: Vièla) is a commune of the Pyrénées-Atlantiques department in southwestern France.

== See also ==
- Ossau Valley
- Communes of the Pyrénées-Atlantiques department
