= Lac d'Artouste =

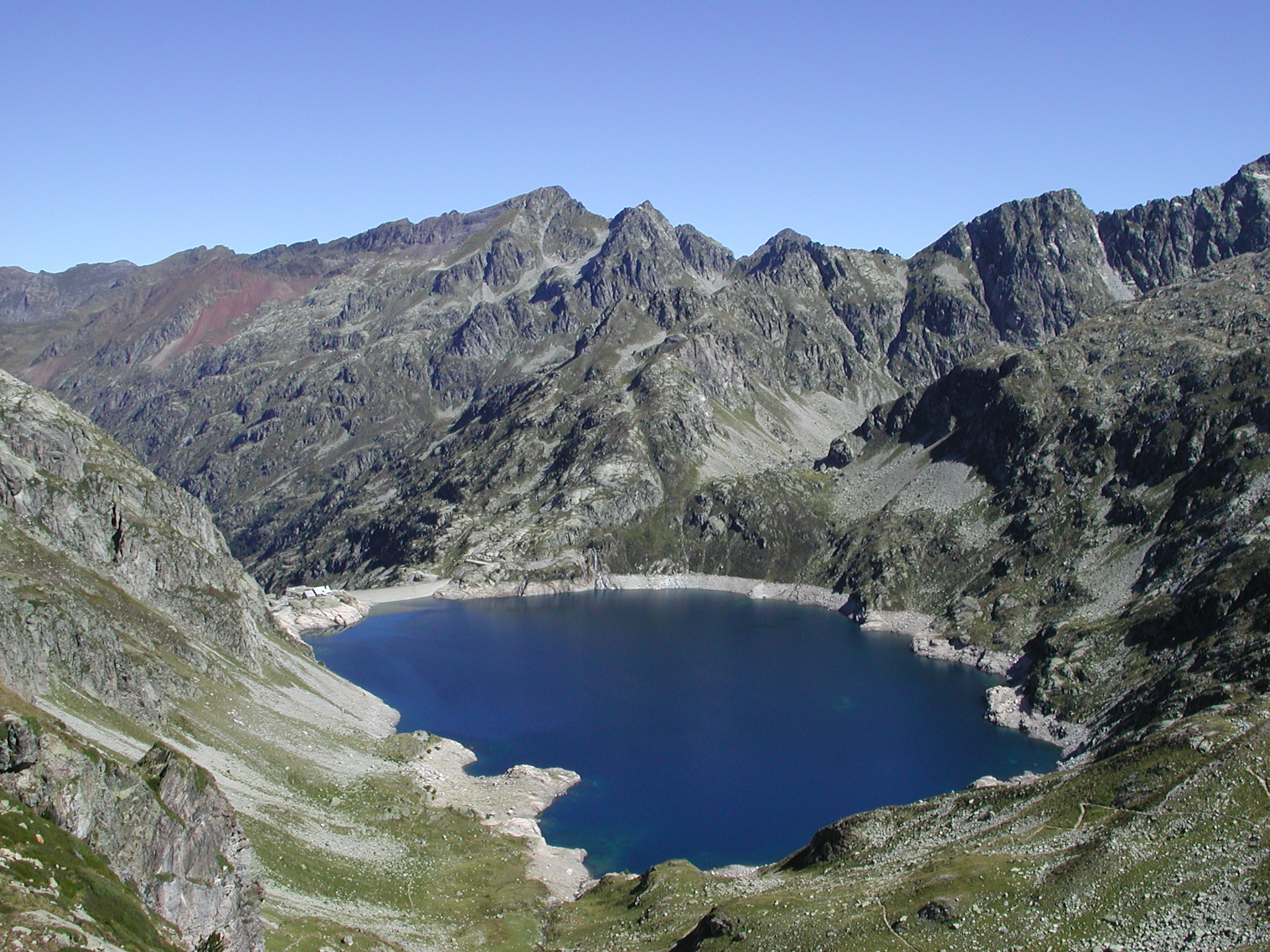

- Location within France
- Location: Pyrénées-Atlantiques
- Coordinates: 42.86°N 0.33°W
- Type: reservoir, natural lake
- Primary inflows: Arrémoulit Creek; Arrious Creek
- Primary outflows: Gave du Soussouéou
- Catchment area: 7.7 km^{2} (3.0 sq mi)
- Basin countries: France
- Surface area: 0.56 km^{2} (0.22 sq mi)
- Average depth: 85 m (279 ft)
- Surface elevation: 1,997 m (6,552 ft)

Lac d'Artouste is a lake in Pyrénées-Atlantiques, France in the region of Nouvelle-Aquitaine. At an elevation of 1997 m, its surface area is 0.56 km^{2}.

== Geography ==
=== Topography ===
The Lac D'Artouste is a natural lake of glacier origins in the Ossau Valley situated at 1,997 metres (6,552 ft) in altitude.

It is bordered on three of its four sides by the Pyrénées National Park.

=== Hydrography ===
The lake receives water from the Arrémoulit Creek (coming from the Arrémoulit Lakes), from a serpentine creek coming from the Arrious Lake Peak and from the Batboucou Lakes. The Gave du Soussouéou is fed by the lake.

The Lac d'Artouste is also connected to the Migouélou Lake by an 800m gallery currently unused under the Artouste Pass by the Carnau Lakes, and in winter the Lac d'Artouste is also fed by three water cranes situated in the Azun Valley at the foot of the Balaïtous (Batbieilh, Batcrabère et Larribet), of which the water would normally run towards the gave de Pau.

The dam also supplies an underground power plant under the dam (73 m drop) with an installed strength equivalent to 2634 kva. The water is then forwarded by a gallery following the rail line (recuperating the waters from each thalweg), up until Sagette, towards the penstocks of the Artouste factory, exploited by the SHEM. Another priority supply brings water by a gallery and a penstock to the Pont de Camps factory located upstream from the Fabrèges Lake.

== History ==
=== Dam ===
The natural lake (initially at an altitude of 1,922 metres (6,306 ft)) was raised by a slightly curved concrete dam 27 m tall put in service in 1929 in order to supply the Artouste hydroelectric power plant in the Ossau Valley. The dam was raised a second time in 1962 in order to augment storage and therefore the producible, and to supply the fall of the Pont de Camps power plant located upstream from the Fabrèges Lake.
