= Artiguelouve =

- Commune
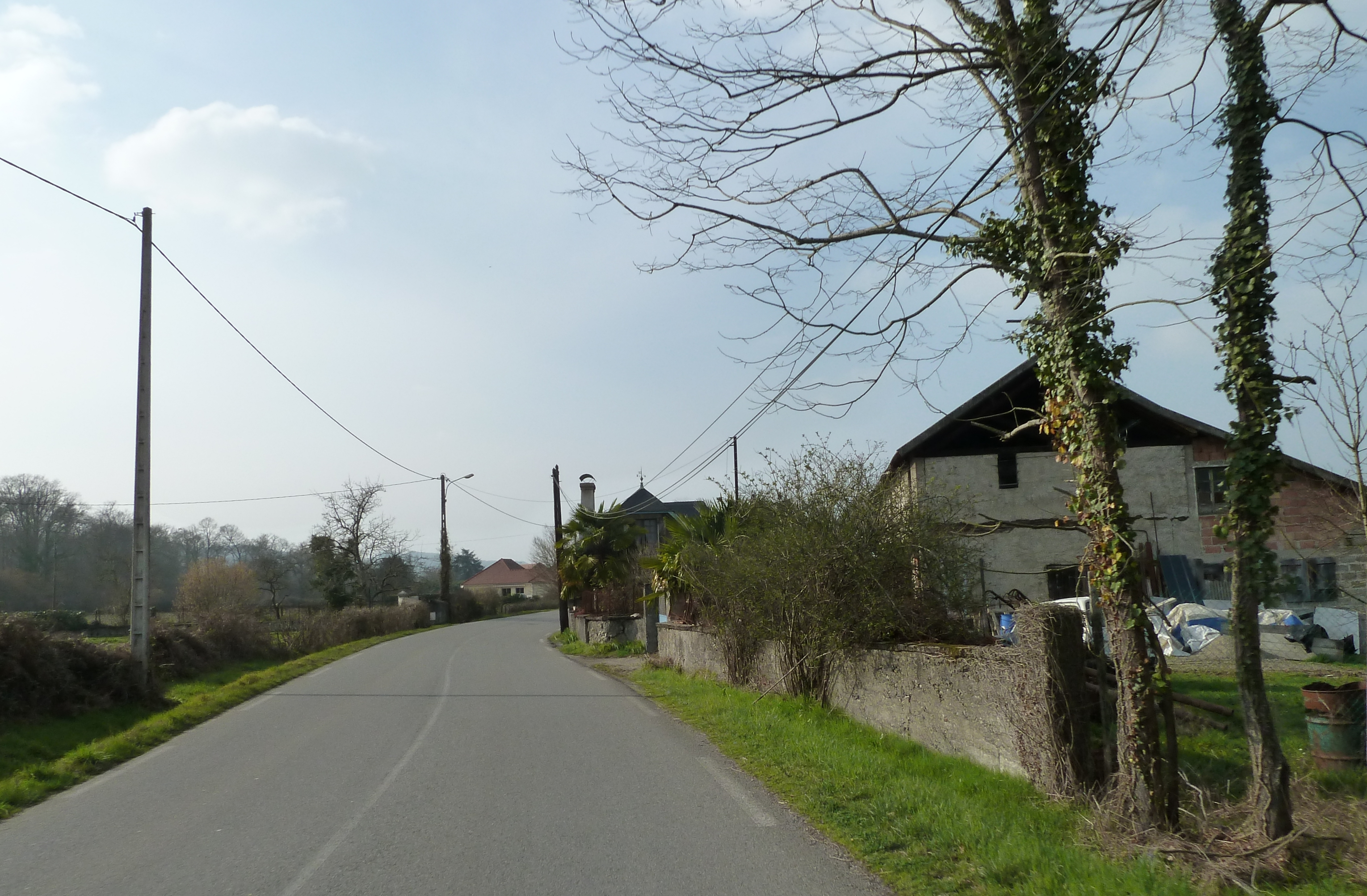
- View of Artiguelove

- Coat of arms
- Location of Artiguelouve
- Location within France Location within Nouvelle-Aquitaine
- Coordinates: 43°19′07″N 0°28′26″W
- Country: France
- Region: Nouvelle-Aquitaine
- Department: Pyrénées-Atlantiques
- Arrondissement: Pau
- Canton: Lescar, Gave et Terres du Pont-Long
- Intercommunality: CA Pau Béarn Pyrénées

Government
  - Mayor (2020–2026): Jean-Marc Denax
- Area^{1}: 10.74 km^{2} (4.15 sq mi)
- Elevation: 156 m (512 ft)
- Highest elevation: 300 m (980 ft)
- Lowest elevation: 137 m (449 ft)
- Population (2023): 2,045
  - Density: 190.4/km^{2} (493.2/sq mi)
- Time zone: UTC+01:00 (CET)
  - Summer (DST): UTC+02:00 (CEST)
- INSEE/Postal code: 64060 /64230
- ^{1} French Land Register data, which excludes lakes, ponds, glaciers > 1 km^{2} (0.386 sq mi or 247 acres) and river estuaries.

Artiguelouve (French pronunciation: [aʁtiɡluv]; Occitan: Artigaloba) is a commune in the Pyrénées-Atlantiques department in the Nouvelle-Aquitaine region of south-western France.

== Geography ==
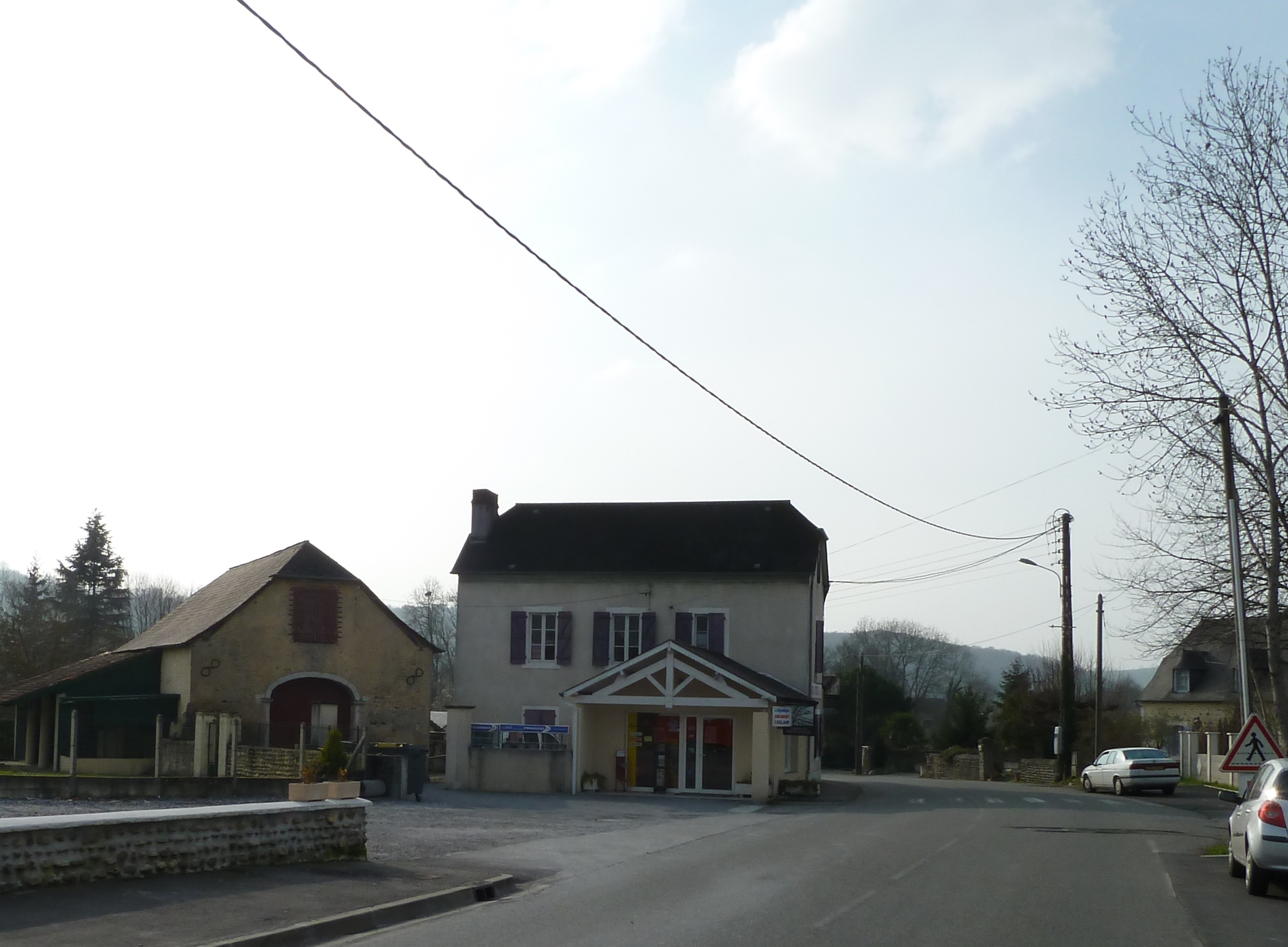
Grocery in Artiguelouve

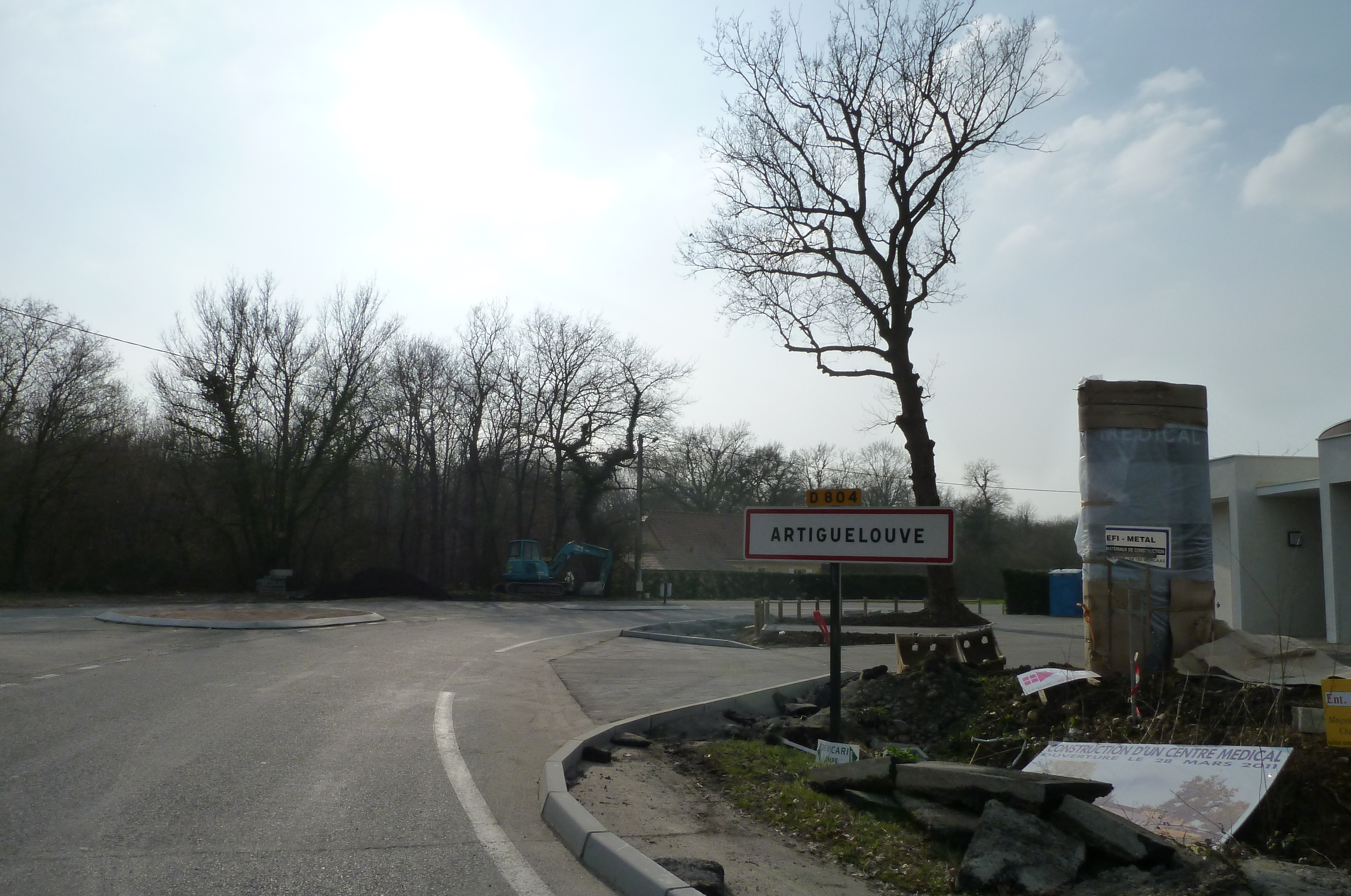
Entry to the village

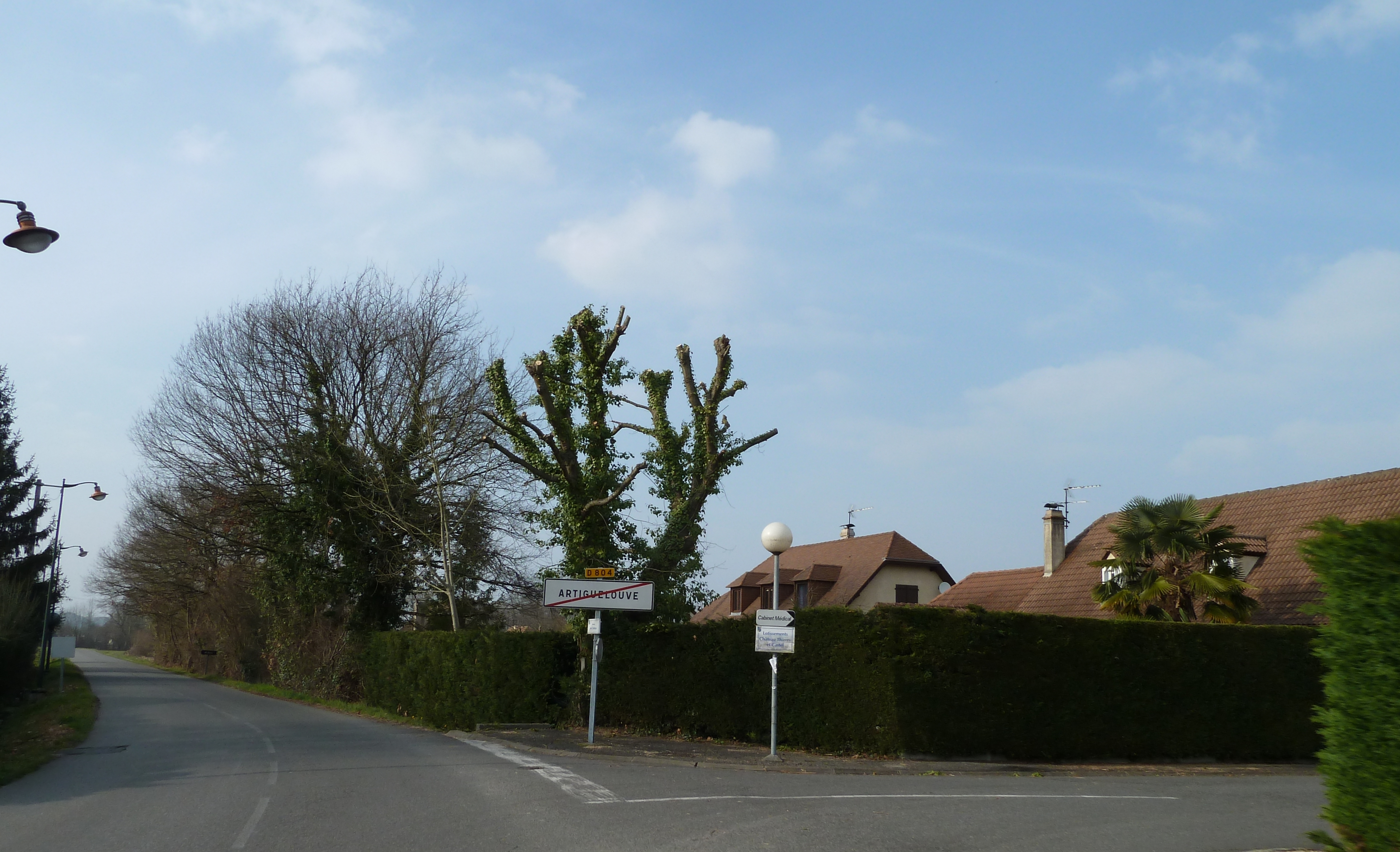
Exit from the village

Artiguelouve is located in the urban area of Pau some 8 km north-west of Pau and 3 km south-west of Lescar. Access to the commune is by road D2 from Laroin in the south-east passing through the north-east of the commune and continuing north-west to Pardies. The D509 connects the D2 to the D817 across the river. The D804 branches off the D2 in the commune and goes west along the northern fringe of the town and continues to Arbus. Access to the centre of the town is by the D146 which branches off the D804 and goes south through the town and continues to Aubertin. The residential area of the town occupies about 10% of the commune with the rest mixed forest and farmland.

Bus Route 802 from Artix to Pau of the Interurban network of Pyrénées-Atlantiques has a stop in the commune.

The Gave de Pau runs along the north-eastern border of the commune and passes through the north of the commune flowing north-west. The Juscle river flows from the south of the commune to near the town then flows north-west parallel to the Gave de Pau until it eventually joins the Gave de Pau near Tarsacq.

=== Places and Hamlets ===
- Baïlot
- Barat
- Barrailh
- Les Barthes
- Bénou
- Biroulet
- Bordenave
- Brouquisse
- Castagnous
- Castéra
- Cinquau
- Coudelounguet
- Duran
- Le Gras
- Grassa
- Guillou
- Haget
- Lacoste
- Lacoude
- Lacoustète
- Lansolles
- Larréheuga
- Lassauque
- Loumède
- Loustau
- Milhé
- Cité des Mimosas
- Mirande
- Mondet
- Ogeu (fountain)
- Paille
- Pélou
- Peyreblanque
- Piqueur
- Pucheu
- Puyade
- Les Sagettes
- Salaberthe
- Serra
- Tuquet
- Turon
- Le Vert Galant

== Toponymy ==
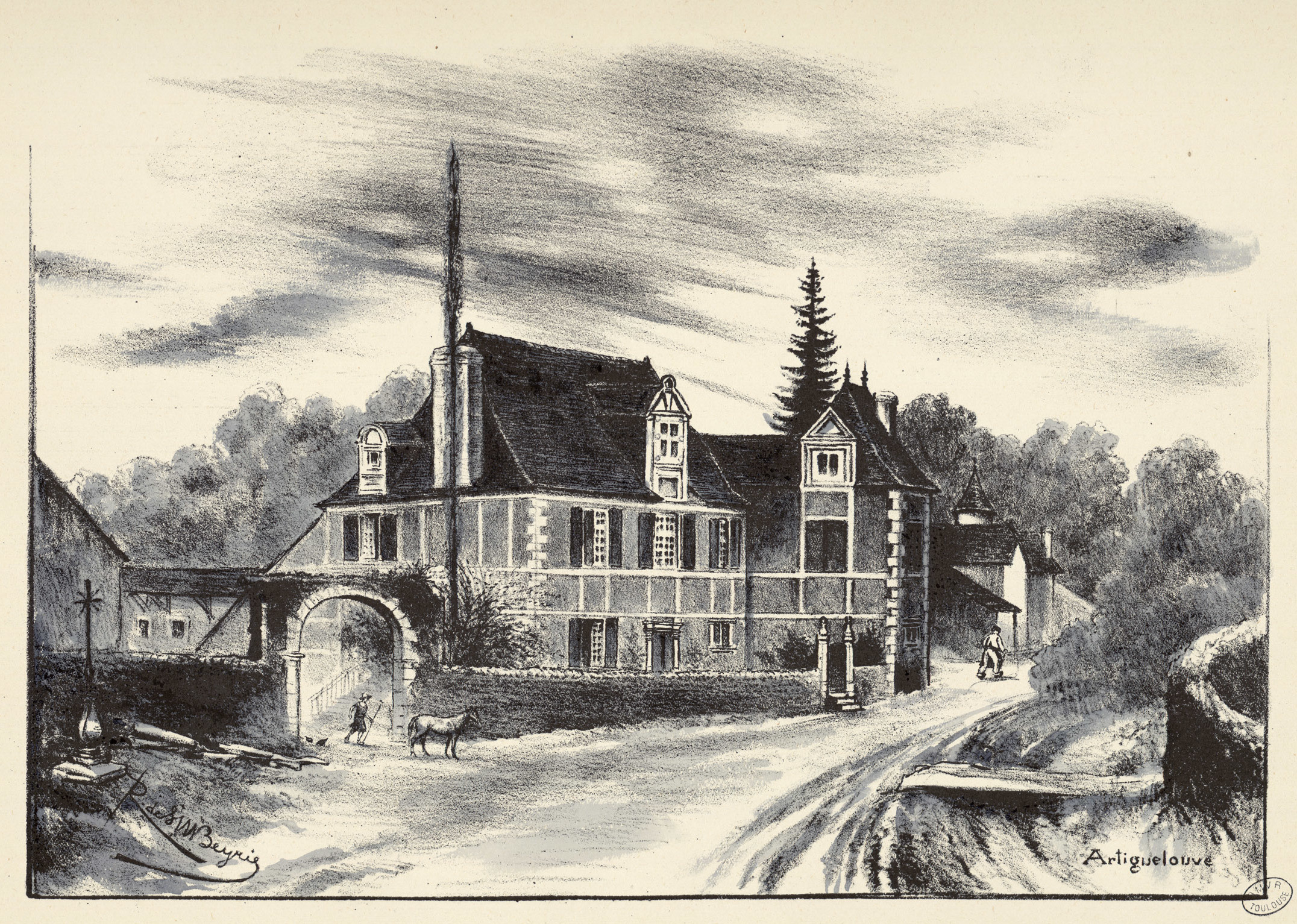
Artiguelouve in 1926

Artiguelouve (meaning "clearing of wolves" in the béarnaise definition), comes from 'artiga which means "clearing" or "fallow land" and the oronym lob ("height").

The following table details the origins of the commune name and other names in the commune.

| Name | Spelling | Date | Source | Page | Origin | Description |
|---|---|---|---|---|---|---|
| Artiguelouve | Artiguelouve | 12th century | Raymond | 14 | Marca | Village |
| | Artiguelobe | 1220 | Raymond | 14 | Order of Malta | |
| | Artigaloba | 1286 | Raymond | 14 | Titles of Fiefdom E267 | |
| | Artiguelobe | 1385 | Grosclaude | | Census | |
| | Artigaloba | 1286 | Raymond | 14 | Titles of Fiefdom E267 | |
| | Artigaloube | 1630 | Marca | 450 | | |
| | Artigueloube | 1630 | Marca | 256 | | |
| | Artigalouve | 1750 | Cassini | | | |
| Ardos | Ardaos | 1101 | Raymond | 9 | Lescar | Hamlet (destroyed), Fief, vassal of the Viscounts of Béarn, belonged to the Jurors of Lescar |
| | Nardos | 1449 | Raymond | 9 | Cour Major | |
| | Ardoos | 1538 | Raymond | 9 | Reformation | |

Sources:

- Raymond: Topographic Dictionary of the Department of Basses-Pyrenees, 1863, on the page numbers indicated in the table. (in French)
- Grosclaude: Toponymic Dictionary of communes, Béarn, 2006 (in French)
- Marca: Pierre de Marca, History of Béarn.
- Cassini: Cassini Map from 1750

Origins:

- Marca: Pierre de Marca, History of Béarn.
- Order of Malta: Titles of the Order of Malta
- Census: Census of Béarn
- Lescar: Cartulary of Lescar
- Cour Major: Regulations of the Cour Major
- Reformation: Reformation of Béarn

== History ==
Paul Raymond noted on page 14 of his 1863 dictionary that, in 1385, Artiguelouve had 28 fires and depended on the bailiwick of Pau. The commune was a dependency of the Marquisate of Gassion and, with Poey, formed the jurisdiction of a notary.

=== Heraldry ===
| Arms of Artiguelouve | These arms do not comply with the Rule of tincture: Or on Argent is not allowed Blazon: Quarterly, 1 and 4 Azure, a crescent of Argent between three mullets of Or; 2 Argent, two wolves of Or rampant confronting; 3 a cow of Or collared and belled the same surmounted by a crown of a Marquis the same. |

== Administration ==
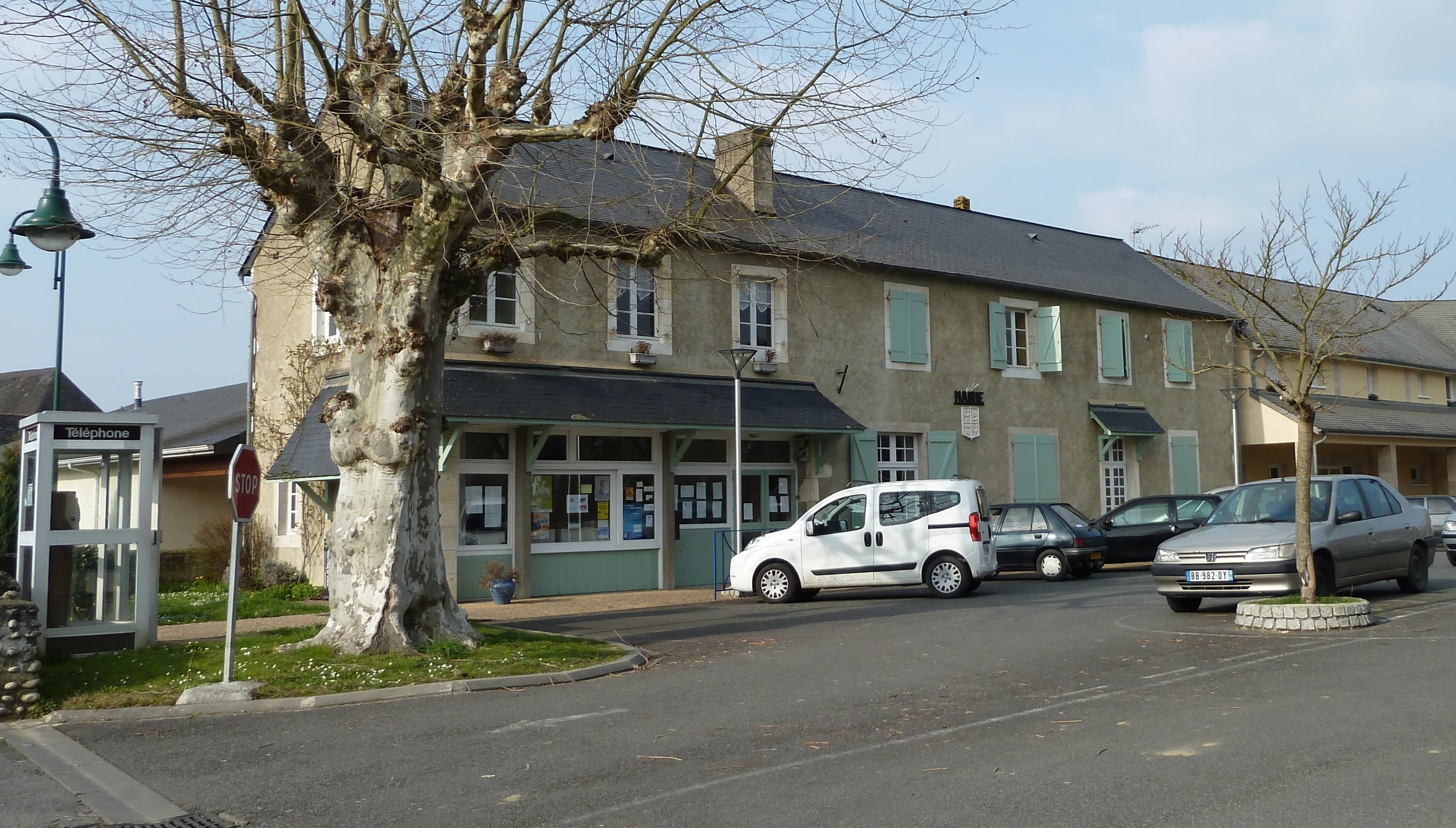
Town Hall

List of Successive Mayors

| From | To | Name |
|---|---|---|
| 1995 | 2001 | Claude Ducasse |
| 2001 | 2014 | Eline Gosset |
| 2014 | 2026 | Jean-Marc Denax |

=== Inter-communality ===
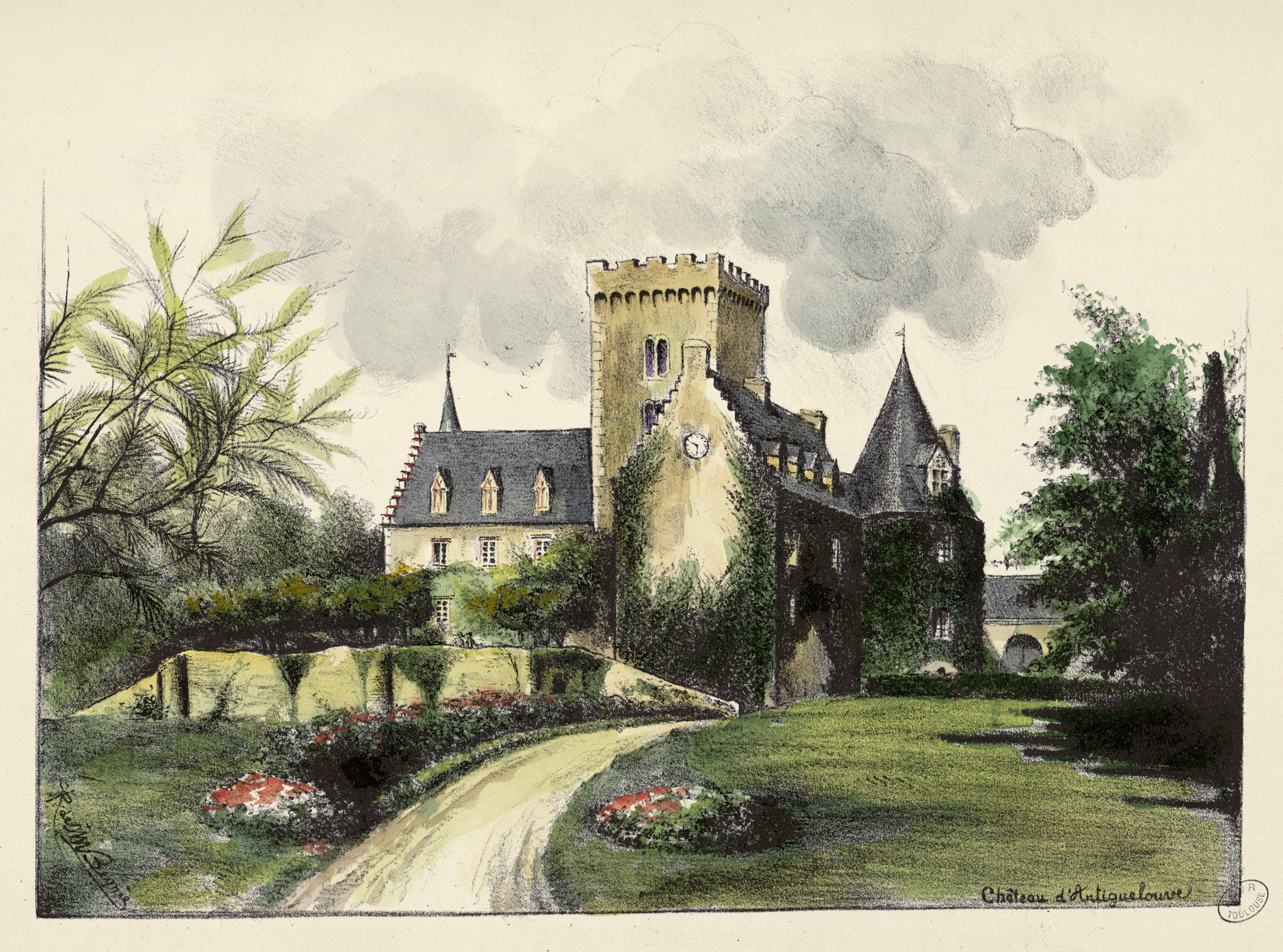
The Chateau of Artiguelouve

The commune is part of seven inter-communal structures:

- the Communauté d'agglomération Pau Béarn Pyrénées;
- the SIVU for nursing home care for senior citizens in the Canton of Lescar;
- the AEP association of Gave and Baise;
- the association for the management of the drainage basin of the Juscle and its tributaries;
- the Sanitation association for the communes of the valleys of the Juscle and the Baise;
- the Energy association of Pyrénées-Atlantiques;
- the inter-communal association for defence against flooding of the Gave de Pau;

== Demography ==
The inhabitants of the commune are known as Artiguelouviens or Artiguelouviennes in French.

Historical population

| Year | Pop. | ±% p.a. |
|---|---|---|
| 1793 | 480 | — |
| 1800 | 464 | −0.48% |
| 1806 | 427 | −1.38% |
| 1821 | 606 | +2.36% |
| 1831 | 673 | +1.05% |
| 1836 | 662 | −0.33% |
| 1841 | 674 | +0.36% |
| 1846 | 682 | +0.24% |
| 1851 | 660 | −0.65% |
| 1856 | 603 | −1.79% |
| 1861 | 590 | −0.43% |
| 1866 | 545 | −1.57% |
| 1872 | 590 | +1.33% |
| 1876 | 600 | +0.42% |
| 1881 | 577 | −0.78% |
| 1886 | 561 | −0.56% |
| 1891 | 545 | −0.58% |
| 1896 | 551 | +0.22% |
| 1901 | 541 | −0.37% |

| Year | Pop. | ±% p.a. |
|---|---|---|
| 1906 | 541 | +0.00% |
| 1911 | 493 | −1.84% |
| 1921 | 438 | −1.18% |
| 1926 | 445 | +0.32% |
| 1931 | 409 | −1.67% |
| 1936 | 386 | −1.15% |
| 1946 | 413 | +0.68% |
| 1954 | 448 | +1.02% |
| 1962 | 552 | +2.64% |
| 1968 | 549 | −0.09% |
| 1975 | 678 | +3.06% |
| 1982 | 822 | +2.79% |
| 1990 | 898 | +1.11% |
| 1999 | 1,252 | +3.76% |
| 2007 | 1,468 | +2.01% |
| 2012 | 1,595 | +1.67% |
| 2017 | 1,621 | +0.32% |
| 2023 | 2,045 | +3.95% |

Source: EHESS and INSEE

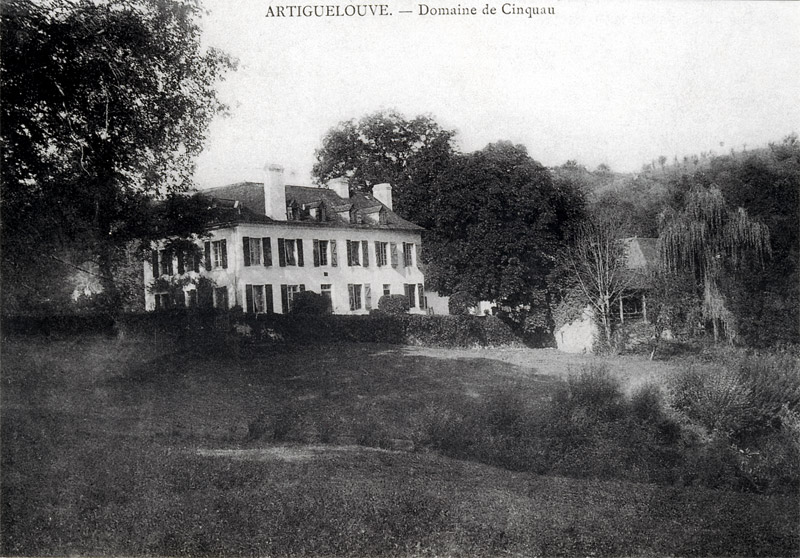
Cinquau around 1899

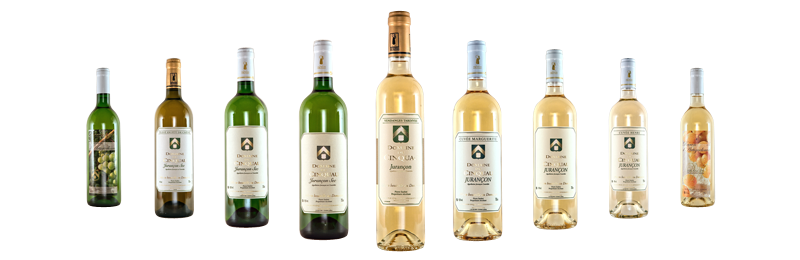
Wines of Jurançon

== Economy ==
The commune is part of the Appellation d'origine contrôlée (AOC) zones of Jurançon AOC, Béarn AOC, and Ossau-iraty.

== Culture and heritage ==
=== Religious heritage ===
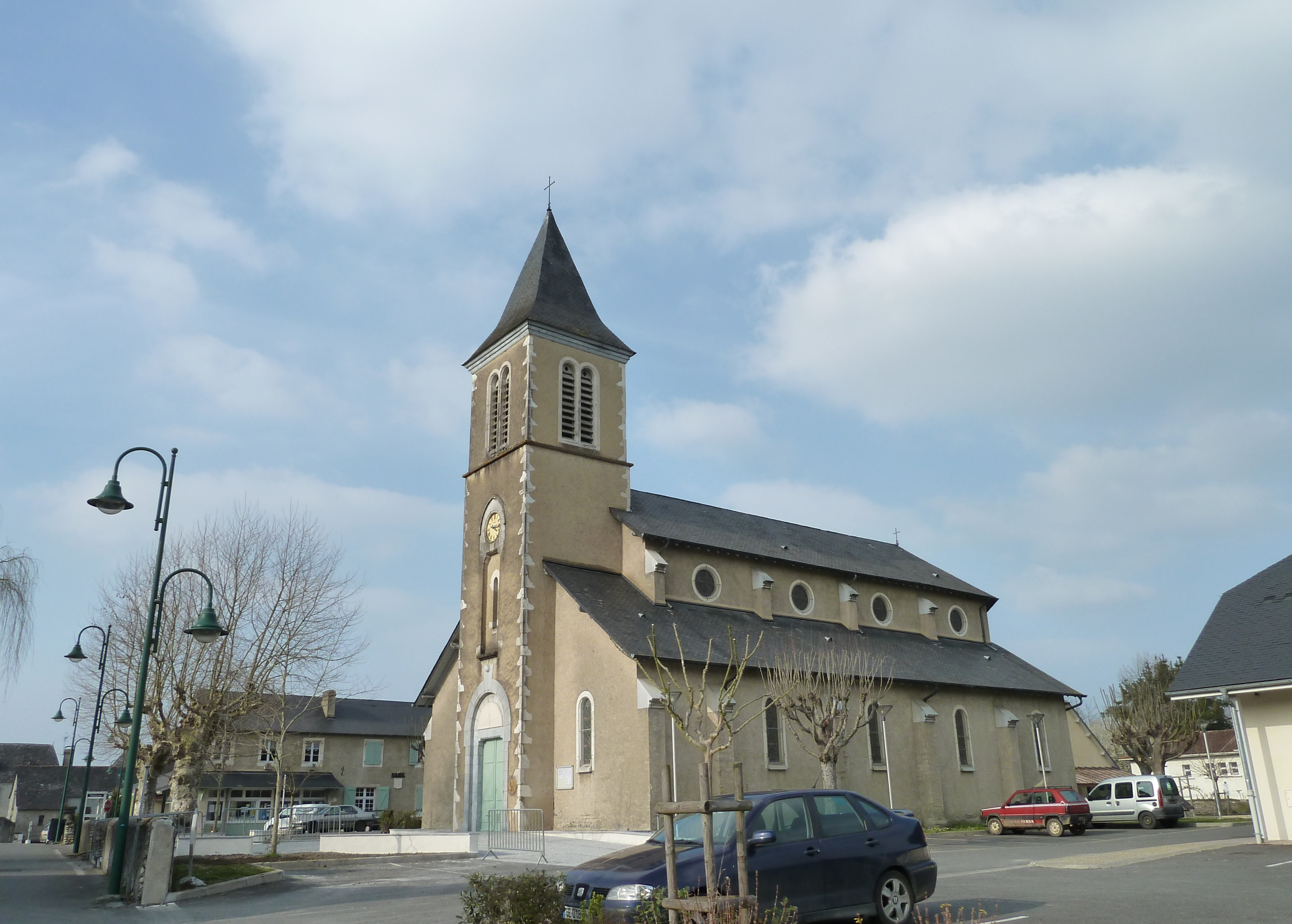
The Church of Saint Michel

The Church of Saint-Michel (15th century) is registered as a historical monument.

== Facilities ==
=== Education ===
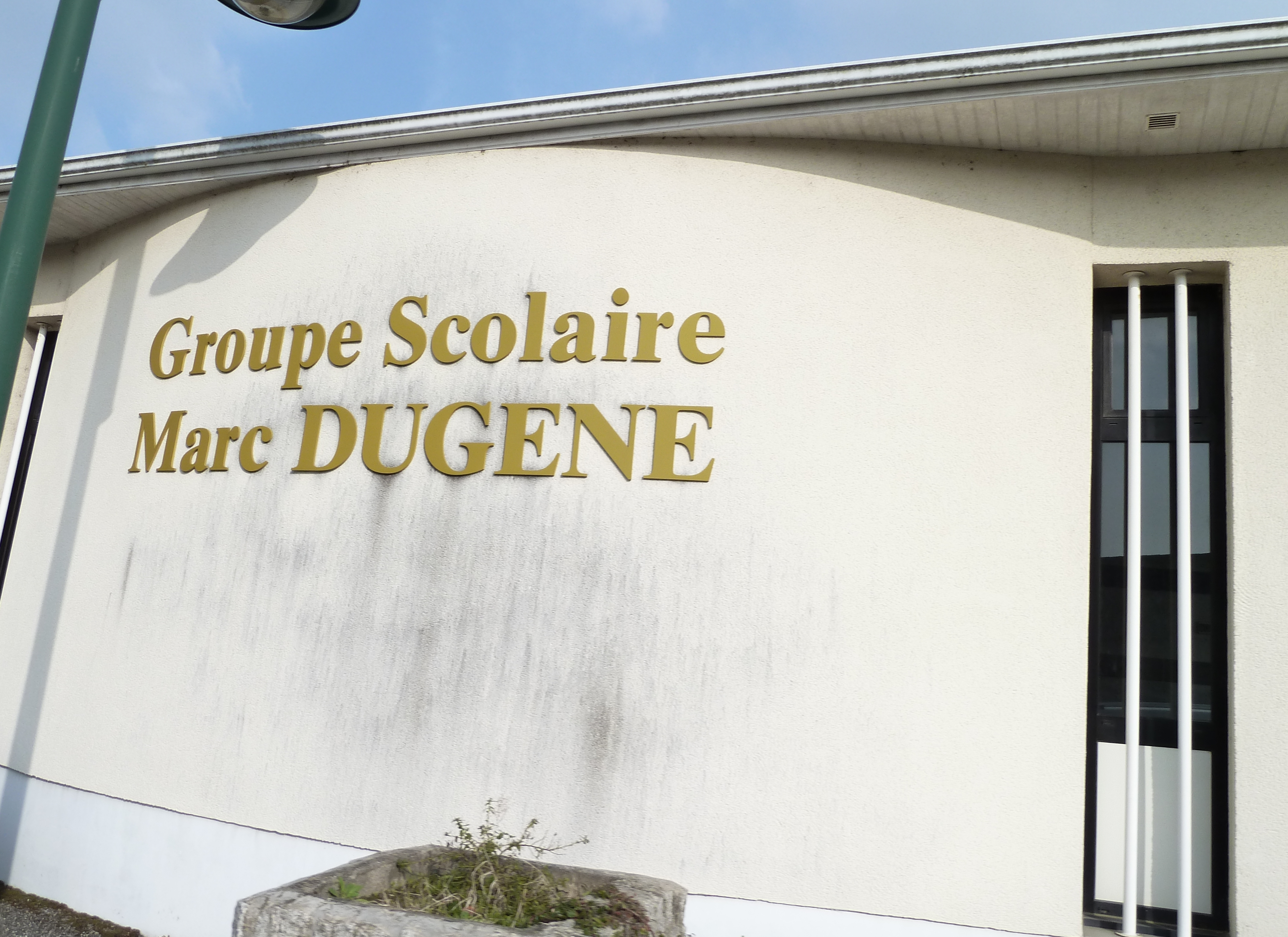
The School

The commune has a school grouping consisting of two kindergarten classes and five primary school class (Marc Dugène School Group) as well as a library / media centre.

=== Sports and Sports facilities ===
The Artiguelouve Golf Course and also that of Billère are the two golf courses in the Pau area. La Maison des sports was opened on 29 May 2010.

Le FC3A is a football club and school for players from Artiguelouve, Arbus, and Aubertin.

== Notable people linked to the commune ==
- Paul Ducournau, born at Orthez in 1910 and died at Artiguelouve in 1985, was a general in the French Army.

== See also ==
- Communes of the Pyrénées-Atlantiques department
