= Arbus, Pyrénées-Atlantiques =

Arbus
- Commune
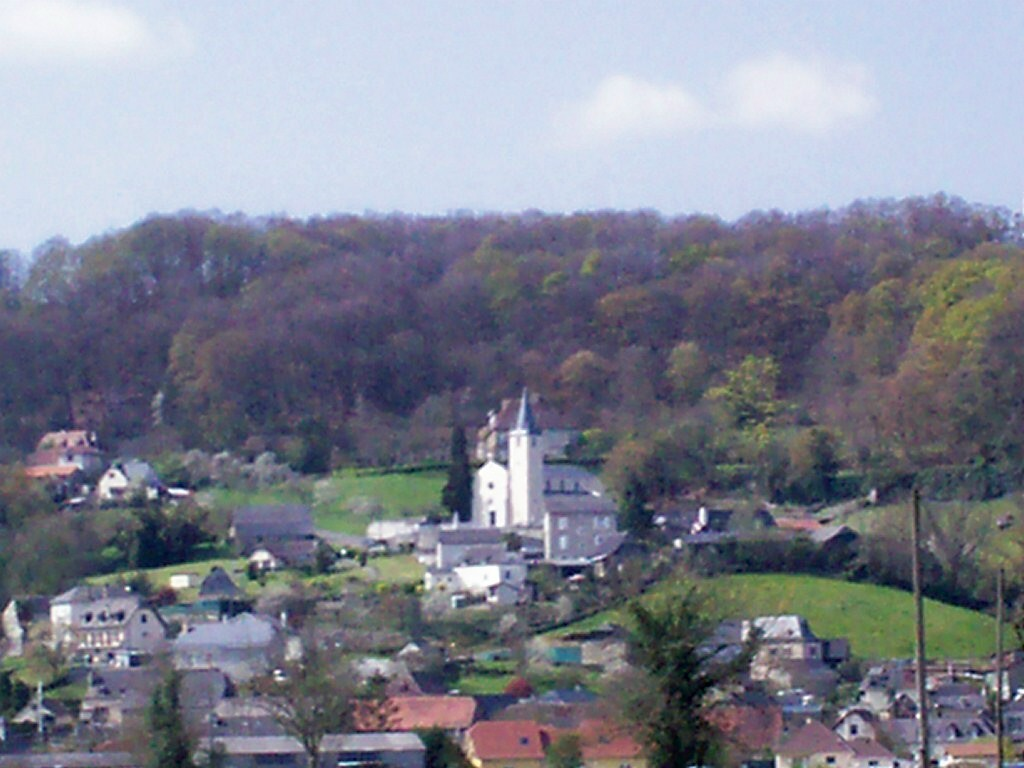
- Arbus Village
- Location of Arbus
- Location within France Location within Nouvelle-Aquitaine
- Coordinates: 43°20′03″N 0°30′17″W
- Country: France
- Region: Nouvelle-Aquitaine
- Department: Pyrénées-Atlantiques
- Arrondissement: Pau
- Canton: Lescar, Gave et Terres du Pont-Long
- Intercommunality: CA Pau Béarn Pyrénées

Government
  - Mayor (2020–2026): Didier Larrieu
- Area^{1}: 13.89 km^{2} (5.36 sq mi)
- Elevation: 144 m (472 ft)
- Highest elevation: 284 m (932 ft)
- Lowest elevation: 125 m (410 ft)
- Population (2023): 1,226
  - Density: 88.26/km^{2} (228.6/sq mi)
- Time zone: UTC+01:00 (CET)
  - Summer (DST): UTC+02:00 (CEST)
- INSEE/Postal code: 64037 /64230
- ^{1} French Land Register data, which excludes lakes, ponds, glaciers > 1 km^{2} (0.386 sq mi or 247 acres) and river estuaries.

Arbus (French pronunciation: [aʁbys]; Occitan: Arbús) is a commune in the Pyrénées-Atlantiques department in the Nouvelle-Aquitaine region of southwestern France.

== Geography ==
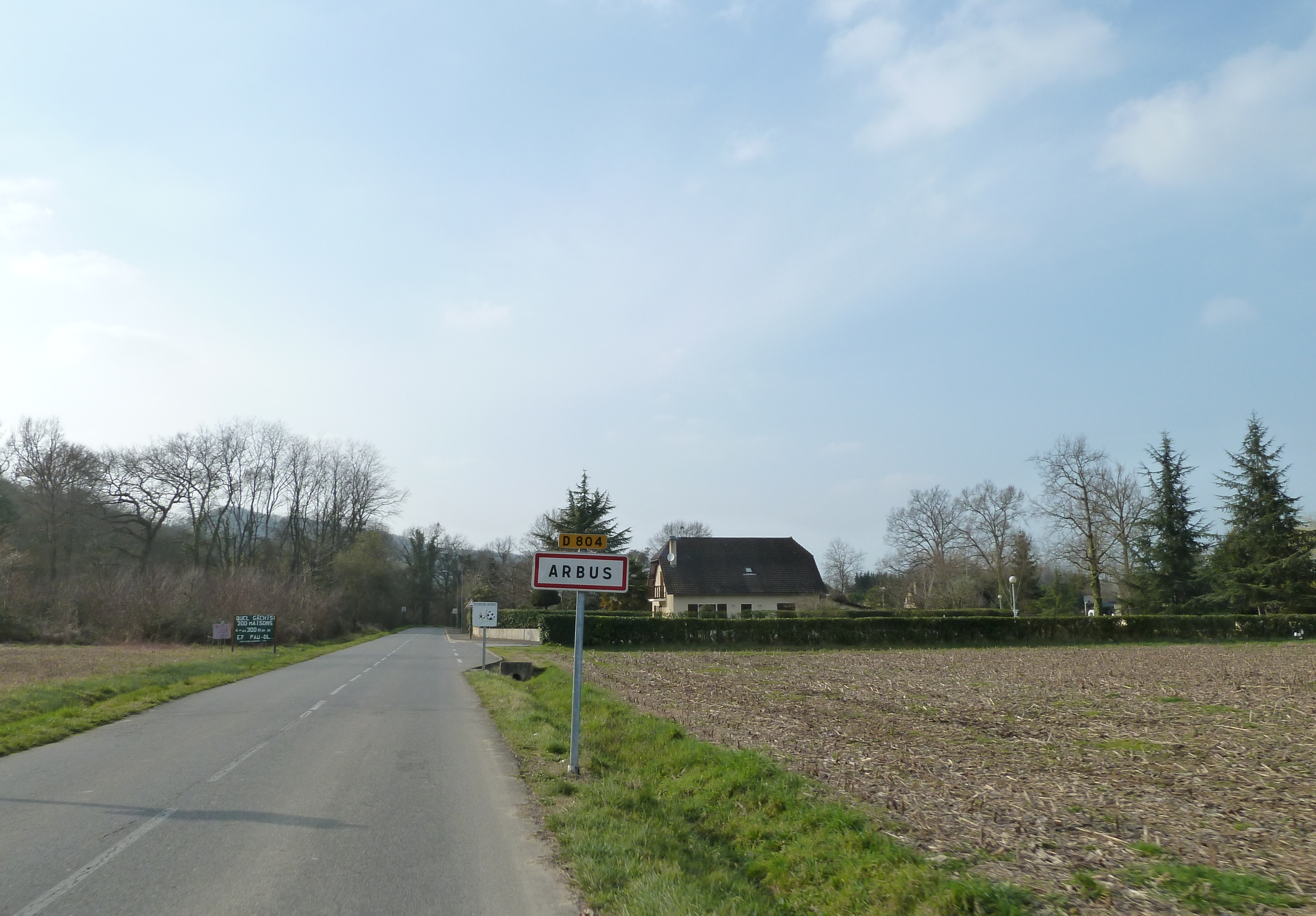
Entry to Arbus.

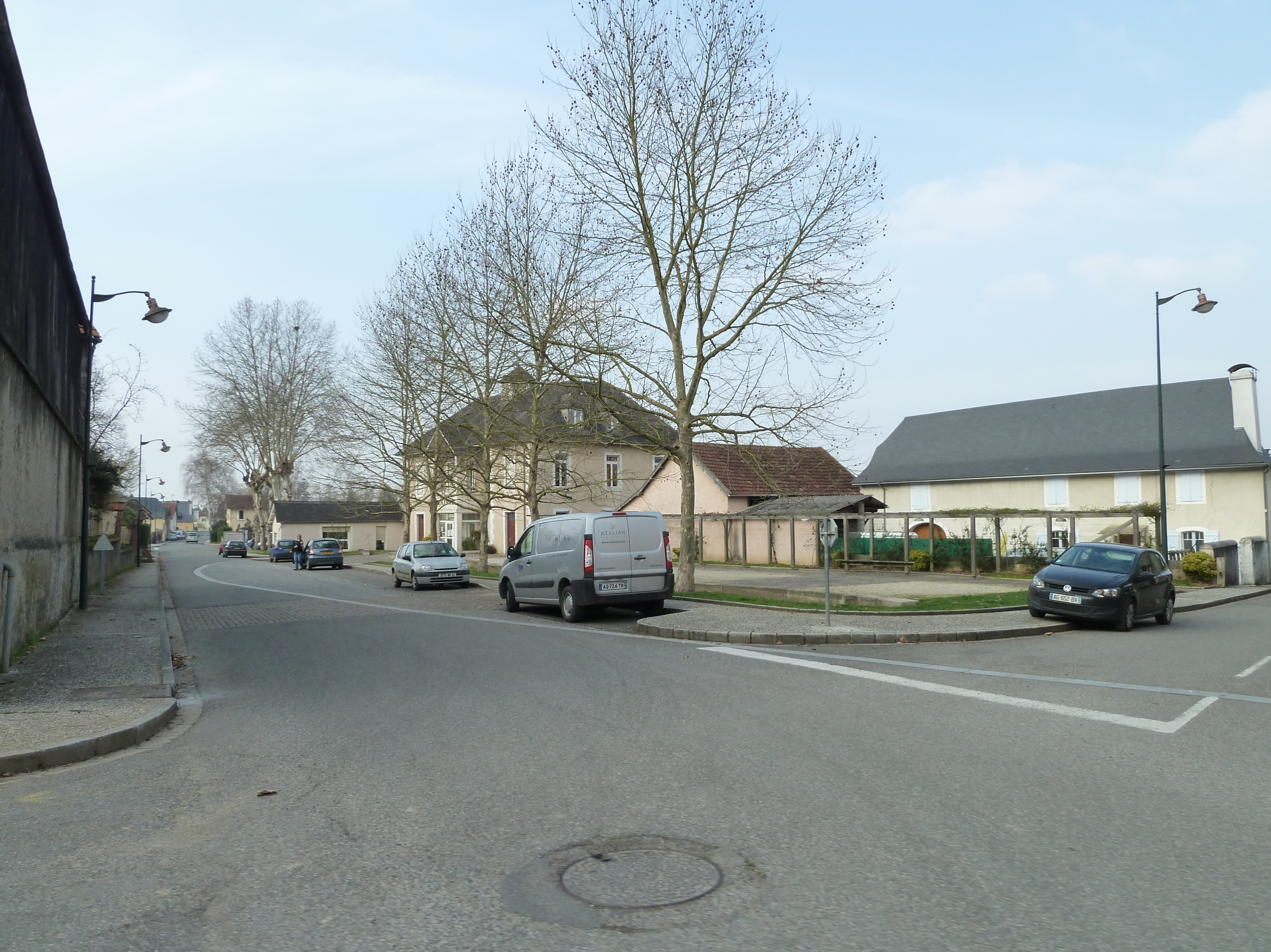
Centre of the village and the Town Hall

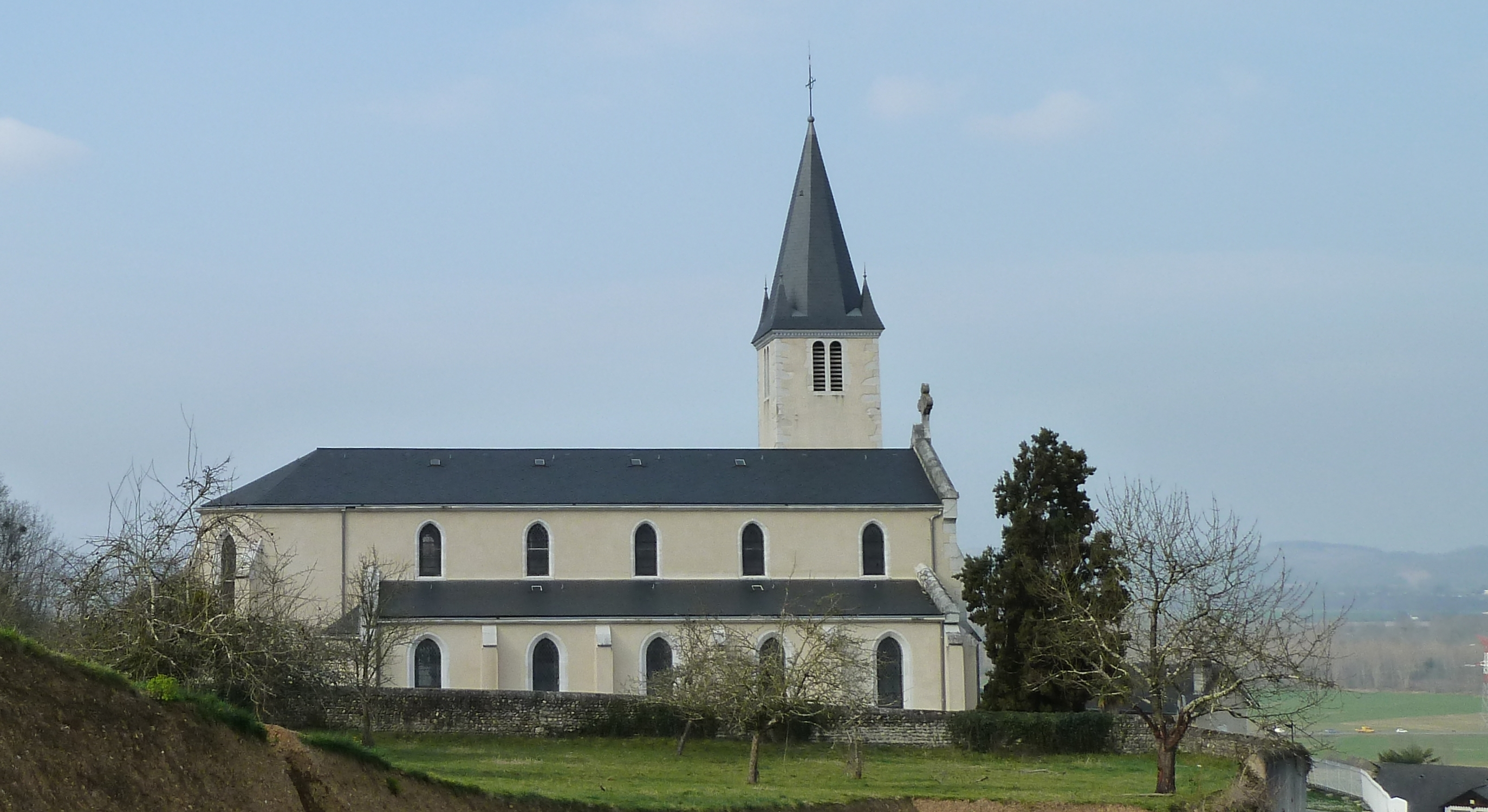
Church of Saint-Mamer

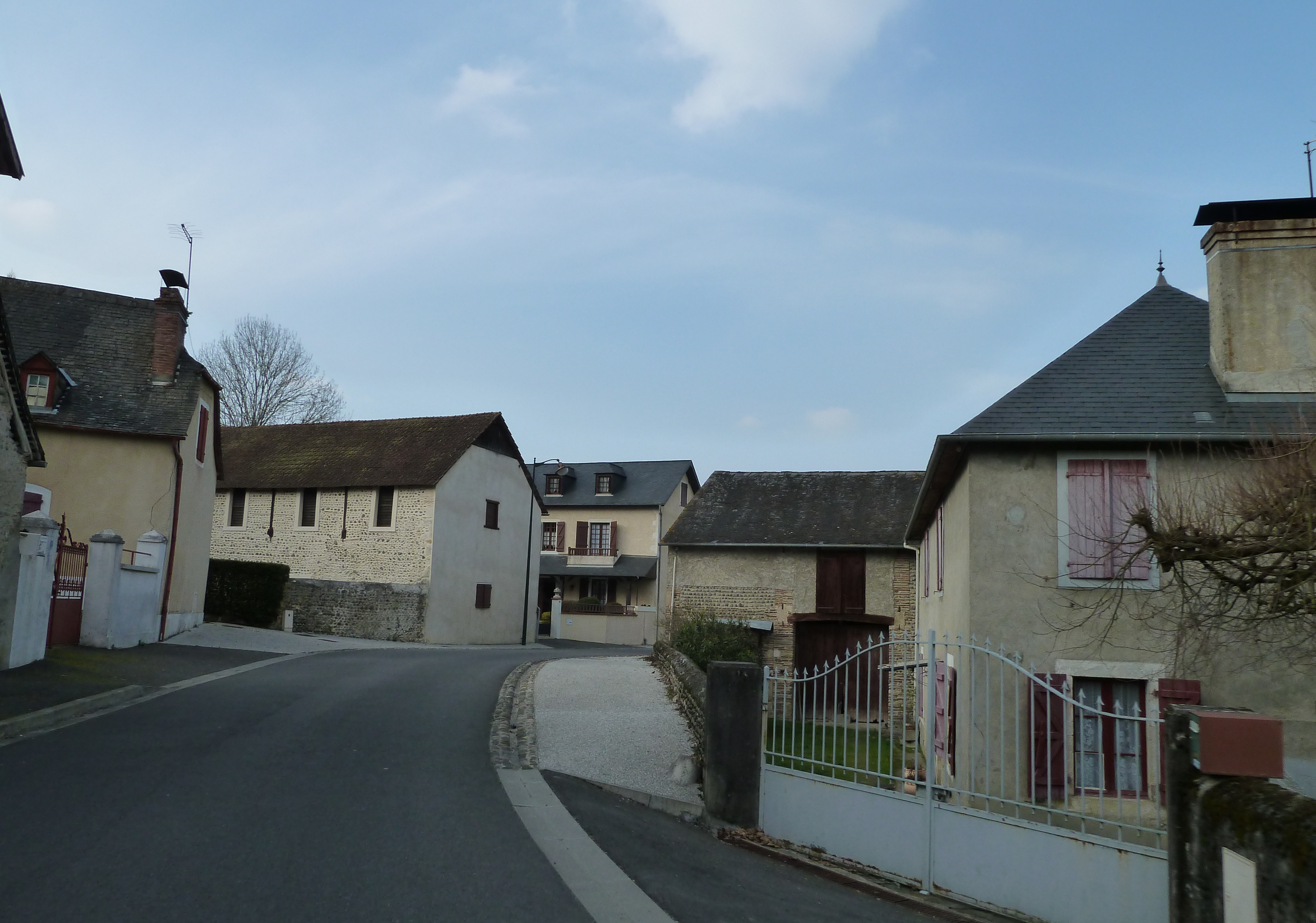
The town

Arbus is located in the urban area of Pau 15 km to the north-west of the city and some 35 km south-east of Orthez mostly on the south bank of the Gave de Pau. Access to the commune is on the D2 road from Laroin in the south-east passing through the north of the commune to Abos in the north-west. Access to the village is by the D804 running off the D2 in the commune and continuing to Artiguelouve in the south-east and also by the D229 from the village to Parbayse in the south-west. The commune is mixed forest and farmland with large forests in the west, south, and south-east.

Located in the Drainage basin of the Adour, the Gave de Pau flows through the northern part of the commune with some of its tributaries flowing through the rest of the commune: the Juscle and Baise Lasseube, as well as their tributaries, the Sibé stream, and the old Canal du Moulin which is itself joined in the commune by the Arrious stream.

=== Historical places and hamlets ===
- Alicq
- Barraqué
- Barrère
- Bédat
- Bellocq
- Berduc
- Bert
- Biscar
- Bordes
- Candau
- Cap d'Arrandes
- Castaing
- Castéra
- Catroui
- Chigé
- Croutzé
- Fages
- Ferrou
- Gaurrat
- Laborde
- Labourdette
- Lacroix
- Lagré
- Lahitte
- Lalanne
- Laplace
- Larribot
- Larrieste
- Laugary
- Manciet
- Monget
- Mounes
- Parisot
- Pé de Lahore
- Peyrounet
- Pommé
- Priou
- Ramonteu
- Rauly
- Saint-Sorque
- Sarthou
- Serviau
- Sibé
- Sibers
- Tourangé
- Les Tourne-Brides
- Tuheil
- Vigneau

== Toponymy ==
The commune name in béarnais is Arbús (according to the classical norm of Occitan). According to Michel Grosclaude, there is an aquitane root *arb-, meaning "grass" (close to alpe), and a collective suffix -untz giving a meaning of "a place where there is grass".

The following table details the origins of the commune name and other names in the commune.

Name	Spelling	Date	Source	Page	Origin	Description
Arbus	Arbus	1170	Raymond	9	Barcelona	Village
	Arbuus	1307	Raymond	9	Orthez	
	Arbus	1385	Grosclaude		Census	
	Arbus	1750	Cassini			
Alicq	Alicq	1863	Raymond	5		Farm
Loubagnon	Looubagnon	1775	Raymond	104	Terrier	Place
Saint-Mamet	Saint-Mamet	1863	Raymond	150		Place
Sibé	Le Ruisseau de Sibe	1863	Raymond	161		Stream, tributary of the Baïse de Lasseube

Sources:

- Raymond: Topographic Dictionary of the Department of Basses-Pyrenees, 1863, on the page numbers indicated in the table. (in French)
- Grosclaude: Toponymic Dictionary of communes, Béarn, 2006 (in French)
- Cassini: Cassini Map from 1750

Origins:

- Barcelona: Titles of Barcelona.
- Orthez: Cartulary of Orthez.
- Census: Census of Béarn
- Terrier: Terrier of Arbus.

== History ==
Paul Raymond on page 5 of his 1863 dictionary noted that in 1385 Arbus had 40 fires and depended on the bailiwick of Pau. The town was a dependency of the Marquisate of Gassion.

== Administration ==
List of Successive Mayors

From	To	Name
1995	2026	Didier Larrieu

=== Inter-communality ===
The commune of Arbus is part of eight inter-communal structures:

- the Communauté d'agglomération Pau Béarn Pyrénées;
- the SIVU for the management and development of the watercourses in the Baïses basin;
- the SIVU for aged and infirm services for the Canton of Lescar;
- the AEP association for Gave and Baïse;
- the association for the management of the banks of the Juscle and its tributaries;
- the association for sanitation of the communes in the valleys of the Juscle and the Baïse;
- the Energy association for Pyrénées-Atlantiques;
- the inter-communal syndicate for defence against floods of the Gave de Pau.

== Demography ==
The inhabitants of the commune are known as Arbusiens or Arbusiennes in French.

Historical population

Year	Pop.	±% p.a.
1793	775	—
1800	673	−2.00%
1806	663	−0.25%
1821	751	+0.83%
1831	869	+1.47%
1836	847	−0.51%
1841	837	−0.24%
1846	900	+1.46%
1851	841	−1.35%
1856	823	−0.43%
1861	776	−1.17%
1866	765	−0.29%
1872	730	−0.78%
1876	758	+0.95%
1881	712	−1.24%
1886	700	−0.34%
1891	636	−1.90%
1896	637	+0.03%
1901	637	+0.00%

Year	Pop.	±% p.a.
1906	614	−0.73%
1911	582	−1.06%
1921	568	−0.24%
1926	499	−2.56%
1931	494	−0.20%
1936	507	+0.52%
1946	445	−1.30%
1954	415	−0.87%
1962	469	+1.54%
1968	470	+0.04%
1975	537	+1.92%
1982	663	+3.06%
1990	965	+4.80%
1999	1,031	+0.74%
2007	1,082	+0.61%
2012	1,106	+0.44%
2017	1,205	+1.73%
2023	1,226	+0.29%

Source: EHESS and INSEE

== Economy ==
The commune is part of the Appellation d'origine contrôlée (AOC) zone of Winemakers of Jurançon and of Béarn and partially in the AOC zone for Ossau-iraty.

== Culture and Heritage ==
=== Religious Heritage ===
The Parish Church of Saint-Mamer (1868) is registered as an historical monument.

== Amenities ==
=== Education ===
The town has a primary school.

== Notable people linked to the commune ==
- Arnaud II of Arbus (or Arnaldus of Arbouze) from 1303 to 1320 was Bishop of Lescar.
- Pommiès André, born in 1904 at Bordeaux and died in 1972 at Arbus was a French military Hero of the Resistance.
- Georges Lapassade, born in 1924 at Arbus and died in 2008 at Stains, was a philosopher and French sociologist.

== See also ==
- Communes of the Pyrénées-Atlantiques department
