= Saint-Faust =

- Commune
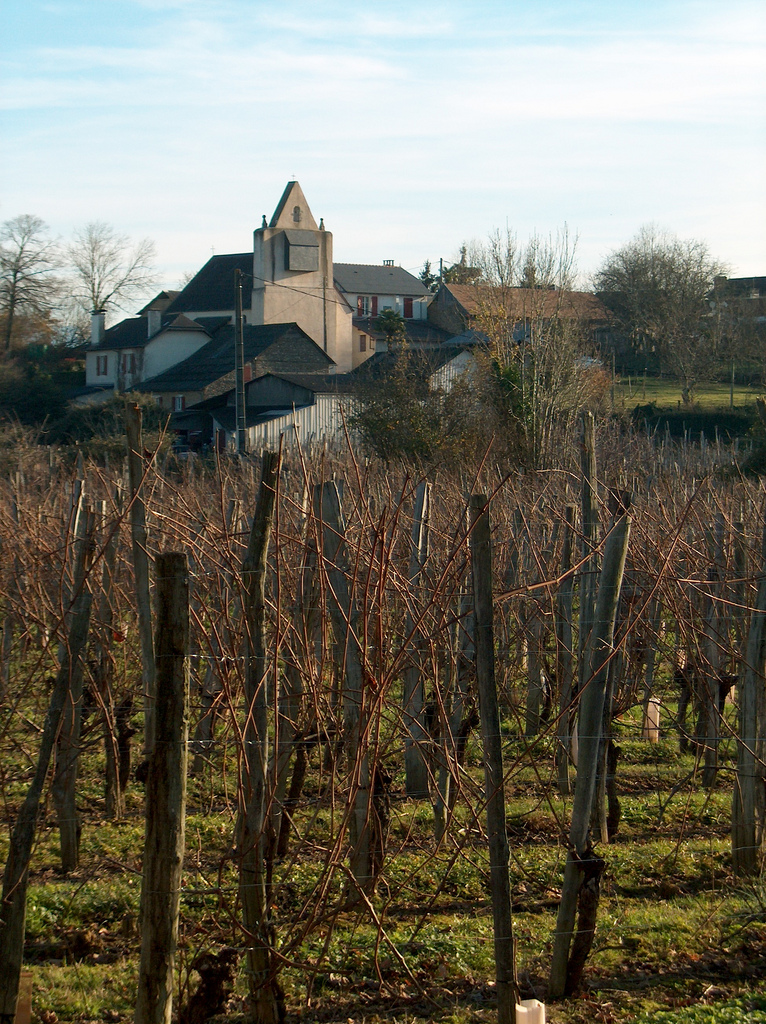
- The church of Saint-Faust and a vineyard
- Location of Saint-Faust
- Location within France Location within Nouvelle-Aquitaine
- Coordinates: 43°16′08″N 0°27′00″W
- Country: France
- Region: Nouvelle-Aquitaine
- Department: Pyrénées-Atlantiques
- Arrondissement: Pau
- Canton: Billère et Coteaux de Jurançon
- Intercommunality: CA Pau Béarn Pyrénées

Government
  - Mayor (2020–2026): Patrick Rousselet
- Area^{1}: 13.51 km^{2} (5.22 sq mi)
- Elevation: 186 m (610 ft)
- Highest elevation: 386 m (1,266 ft)
- Lowest elevation: 170 m (560 ft)
- Population (2023): 738
  - Density: 54.6/km^{2} (141/sq mi)
- Time zone: UTC+01:00 (CET)
  - Summer (DST): UTC+02:00 (CEST)
- INSEE/Postal code: 64478 /64110
- ^{1} French Land Register data, which excludes lakes, ponds, glaciers > 1 km^{2} (0.386 sq mi or 247 acres) and river estuaries.

Saint-Faust (French pronunciation: [sɛ̃ fost]; Occitan: Sent Haust) is a commune in the Pyrénées-Atlantiques department in south-western France.

== History ==
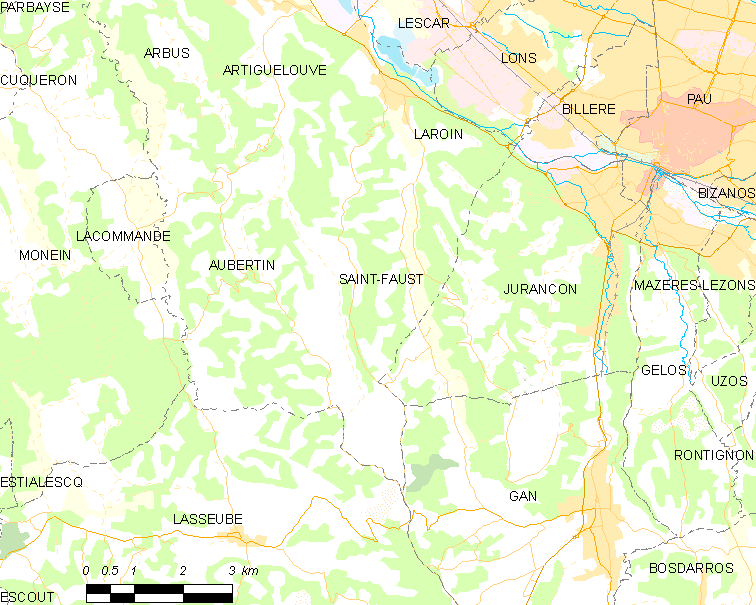
Map of the area. Pau is to the northeast, and Jurançon is to the east of Saint-Faust.

French historian Paul Raymond wrote that in 1385, Saint-Faust and its annex Laroin had 89 fires and depended on the bailiwick of Pau.

Monhauba is an old hamlet of Saint-Faust, destroyed in 1778 when the Gave de Pau river flooded.

== Economy ==
The town is part of the Appellation d'origine contrôlée (AOC) areas of Jurançon and Béarn for wine and that of Ossau-Iraty for cheese.

== Population ==
Historical population

Year	Pop.	±% p.a.
1793	764	—
1821	803	+0.18%
1846	815	+0.06%
1872	701	−0.58%
1901	701	+0.00%
1926	532	−1.10%
1946	432	−1.04%
1962	458	+0.37%
1968	413	−1.71%

Year	Pop.	±% p.a.
1975	437	+0.81%
1982	554	+3.45%
1990	658	+2.17%
1999	730	+1.16%
2007	754	+0.41%
2012	765	+0.29%
2017	746	−0.50%
2023	738	−0.18%

Source: EHESS and INSEE

== See also ==
- Communes of the Pyrénées-Atlantiques department
