= Gros Noir =

Gros noir is the synonym for several wine grape varieties including:

- Camaraou noir
- César (grape)
- Grand Noir de la Calmette
- Peloursin
- Trollinger
