= Lycée Jacques-Monod =

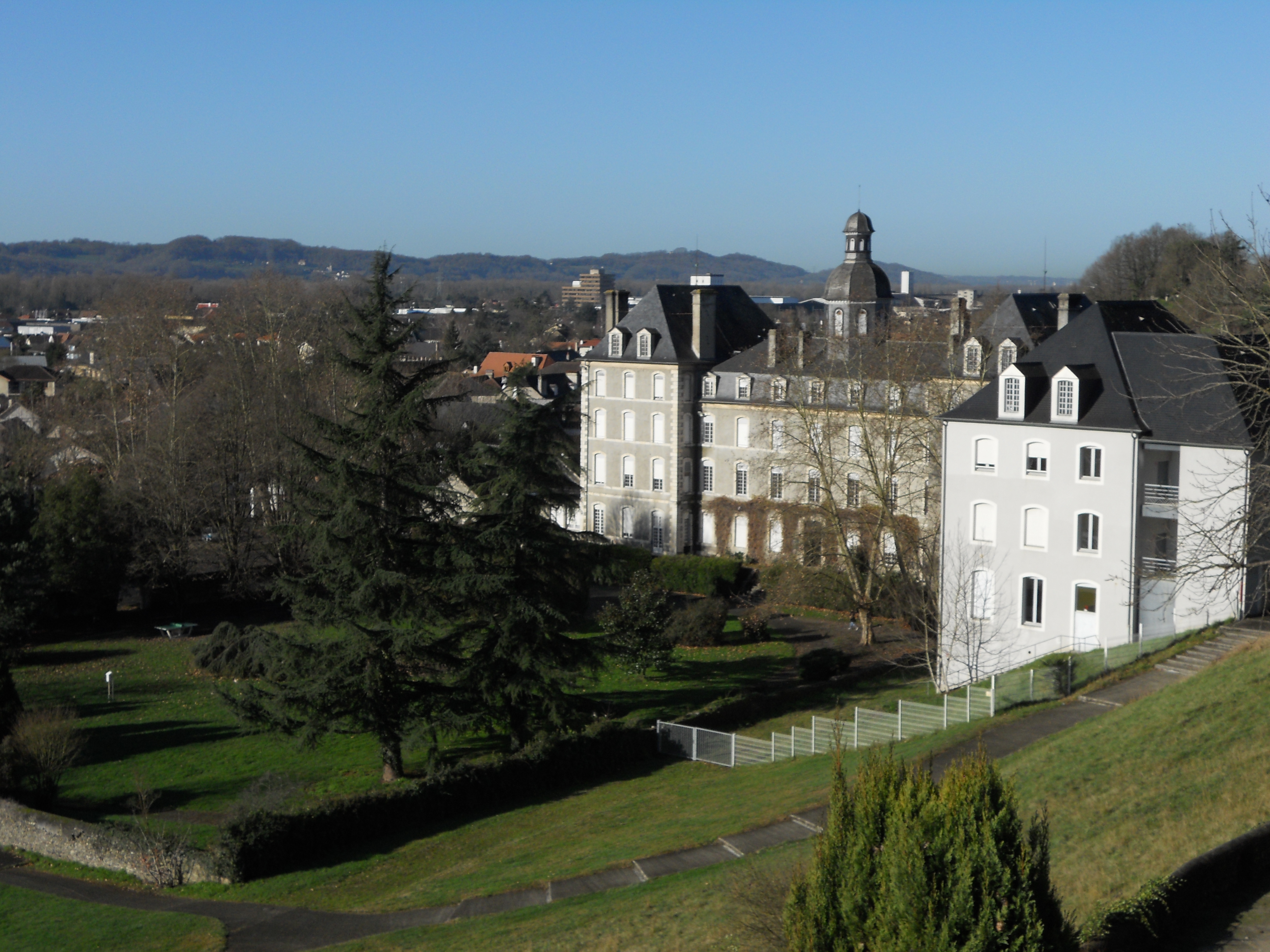
- Lycée Jacques-Monod seen from the ramparts

Location
- 10 rue du Parvis, Lescar; France; 43.332806°N 0.4354384000000664°W

Information
- Established: 1992
- Principal: Rachel Courtoux
- Website: www.lyceejacquesmonod.fr

The lycée Jacques-Monod is a French institute of secondary and higher education located in Lescar (Pyrénées-Atlantiques). It has more than 800 students, and is located in a building with a rich history. Its first use was as a college (1624-1793) run by the Barnabites, a Catholic religious order. After the French Revolution and the closure of many religious institutions, it was a military hospital (1794/5), and then a teacher training college (1845-1978). It became the independent lycée Jacques-Monod in 1992.

== History ==
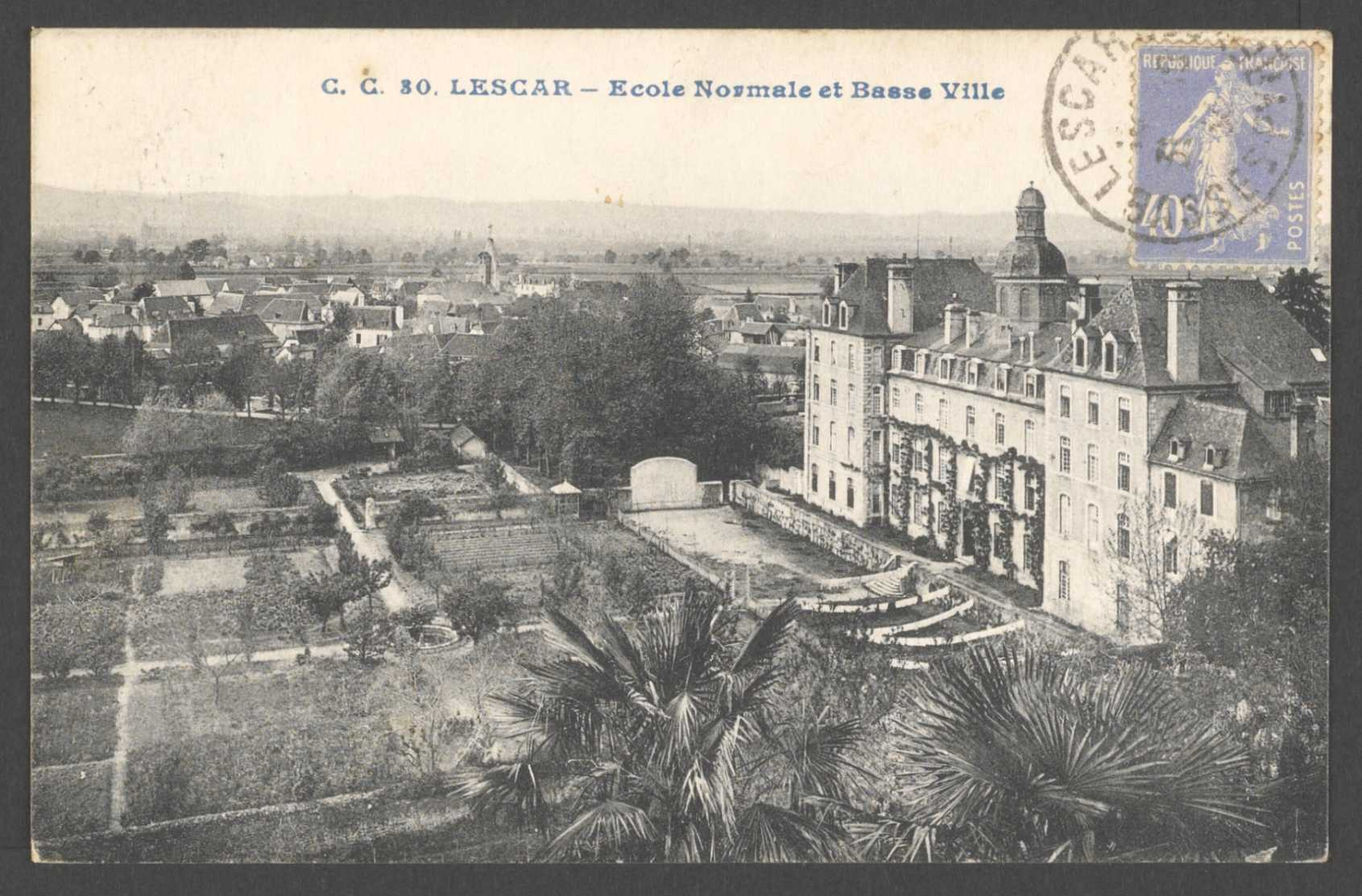
The establishment in 1900

In 1624, three members of the Barnabites were charged by the Bishop Jean de Salettes to educate the youth of Lescar. The Barnabites had been opening schools for lay people since 1608, when money left by Milanese cleric Giambattista Arcimbaldi allowed them to start colleges first in Milan and then all over mostly Northern Italy. The college in Lescar was one of close to a dozen such schools on the other side of the alps, and it opened shortly after Louis XIII invaded the Béarn area in 1620 and ended Protestantism there—including a Calvinist academy that was located in Béarn and Lescar.

A new building was built gradually between 1755 and 1779 to accommodate 100 students. An important library was also constructed, and parts of it still form the current library at Pau. After the revolution, the religious order were forbidden to enter the college, and it closed in 1793. In the third year of the Republic (1794/5), the building was made into a military hospital, the Hôpital de la Montagne, while the War of the Pyrenees was raging.

After 1845, the building returned to its original function, with the founding of a teacher training college for the département of Basses-Pyrénées—established in the old Barnabite college, rather than in the département's capital. Fifty students were taught on 146 are, and a preparatory boarding school was connected to it. In 1978, the building became an annex of the lycée Saint-Cricq in Pau. Finally, the independent lycée Jacques-Monod opened its doors in 1992 after expansion work. The current premises occupy more than 10,500 square metres (113,000 sq ft) and house more than 800 students, including boarders.

== Today ==
=== Educational structure ===
The lycée Jacques-Monod is composed of:

- 8 classes of general secondary education (around 230 students);
- 3 classes of 1st and Tlst S;
- 2 classes of 1st Tlst ES;
- 1 classe of 1st and Tlst L;
- 2 classe of 1st ST2S and 2 classes of Tlst ST2S;
- 1 classe of 1st and Tlst STL;
- 1 classe of BTS bio.

=== Evolution of the lycée ===
The works were undertaken to allow construction of a new building of 2,500 square metres (27,000 sq ft) in the lycée park. This has been operational since the end of 2013 and comprises a kitchen, canteen, library, student office, and reception, student foyer, and multipurpose room for exams, conferences, and student events. The spaces also allow the existing building to free up rooms for courses, local partners, and teachers' lounges. Finally, the cost of the restructuring project was 10.5 million Euros, financed by the region of Aquitaine.
