= Camaralet =

Variety of grape

Camaralet is a white French wine grape variety that is grown primarily in Southwest France. While historically known for its strong aromatics and flavor profile, the grape has been declining in importance and planting and is now nearly extinct.

== Relationship to other grapes ==
The Camaralet may have some relation to another grape grown in Jurançon and Béarn AOCs, Camaraou noir which is also known under the synonym Camaralet noir, but DNA analysis has shown that the two varieties are distinct and not color mutations of one or the other. However, the two varieties share several synonyms.

== Synonyms ==
Various synonyms have been used to describe Camaralet and its wines, including Camaralet blanc, Camaralet à Fleurs Femelles, Camaralet de Lasseube, Camarau, Camaraou blanc, Gentil aromatique, Moustardet and Petit Camarau.
