= Jurançon =

- Commune
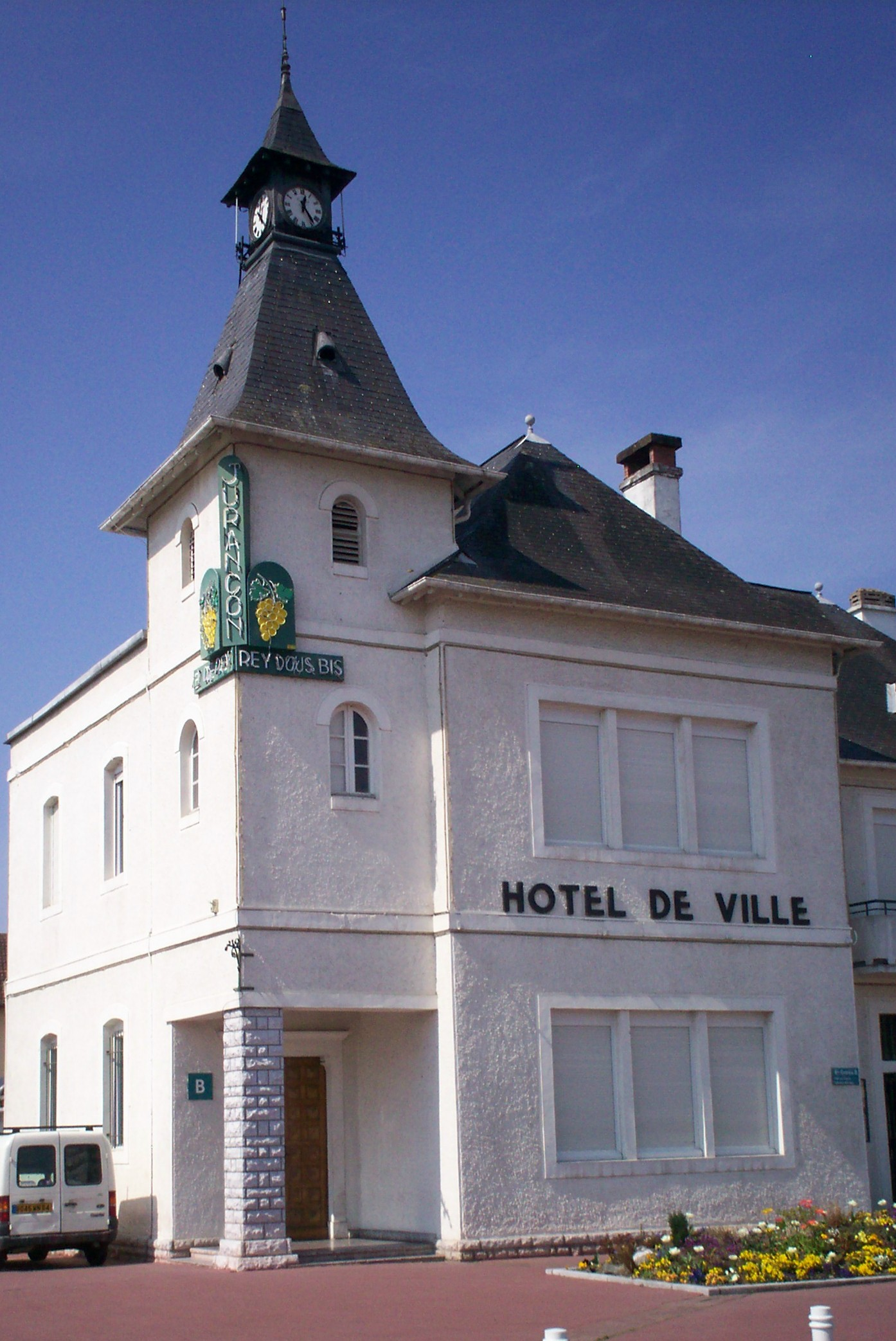
- Juranson town hall

- Coat of arms
- Location of Jurançon
- Location within France Location within Nouvelle-Aquitaine
- Coordinates: 43°17′18″N 0°23′13″W
- Country: France
- Region: Nouvelle-Aquitaine
- Department: Pyrénées-Atlantiques
- Arrondissement: Pau
- Canton: Billère et Coteaux de Jurançon
- Intercommunality: CA Pau Béarn Pyrénées

Government
  - Mayor (2020–2026): Michel Bernos
- Area^{1}: 18.78 km^{2} (7.25 sq mi)
- Elevation: 177 m (581 ft)
- Highest elevation: 365 m (1,198 ft)
- Lowest elevation: 159 m (522 ft)
- Population (2023): 7,040
  - Density: 375/km^{2} (971/sq mi)
- Time zone: UTC+01:00 (CET)
  - Summer (DST): UTC+02:00 (CEST)
- INSEE/Postal code: 64284 /64110
- ^{1} French Land Register data, which excludes lakes, ponds, glaciers > 1 km^{2} (0.386 sq mi or 247 acres) and river estuaries.

Jurançon (French pronunciation: [ʒyʁɑ̃sɔ̃]; Occitan: Juranson) is a commune in the Pyrénées-Atlantiques department in Nouvelle-Aquitaine, France. It is part of the traditional province of Béarn.

== Population ==
Historical population
Year	Pop.	±% p.a.
1968	6,864	—
1975	7,867	+1.97%
1982	7,345	−0.98%
1990	7,538	+0.32%
1999	7,378	−0.24%
2007	6,971	−0.71%
2012	7,046	+0.21%
2017	7,094	+0.14%
2023	7,040	−0.13%
Source: INSEE

== See also ==
- Jurançon AOC, a wine from this commune
- Communes of the Pyrénées-Atlantiques department
