= Camaraou noir =

French wine

Camaraou noir is a red French wine grape variety that was historically grown in South West France but is now more widely planted in the Spanish wine region of Galicia where it is known as Espadeiro. However, despite its Spanish synonym Camaraou noir has no relationship to the Portuguese wine grape Espadeiro that is used to make red Vinho Verde. The grape may have some relation to the Jurançon and Béarn wine grape Camaralet de Lasseube which is also known as Camaraou blanc but DNA analysis has shown that the two varieties are distinct and not color mutations of one or the other.

== History ==
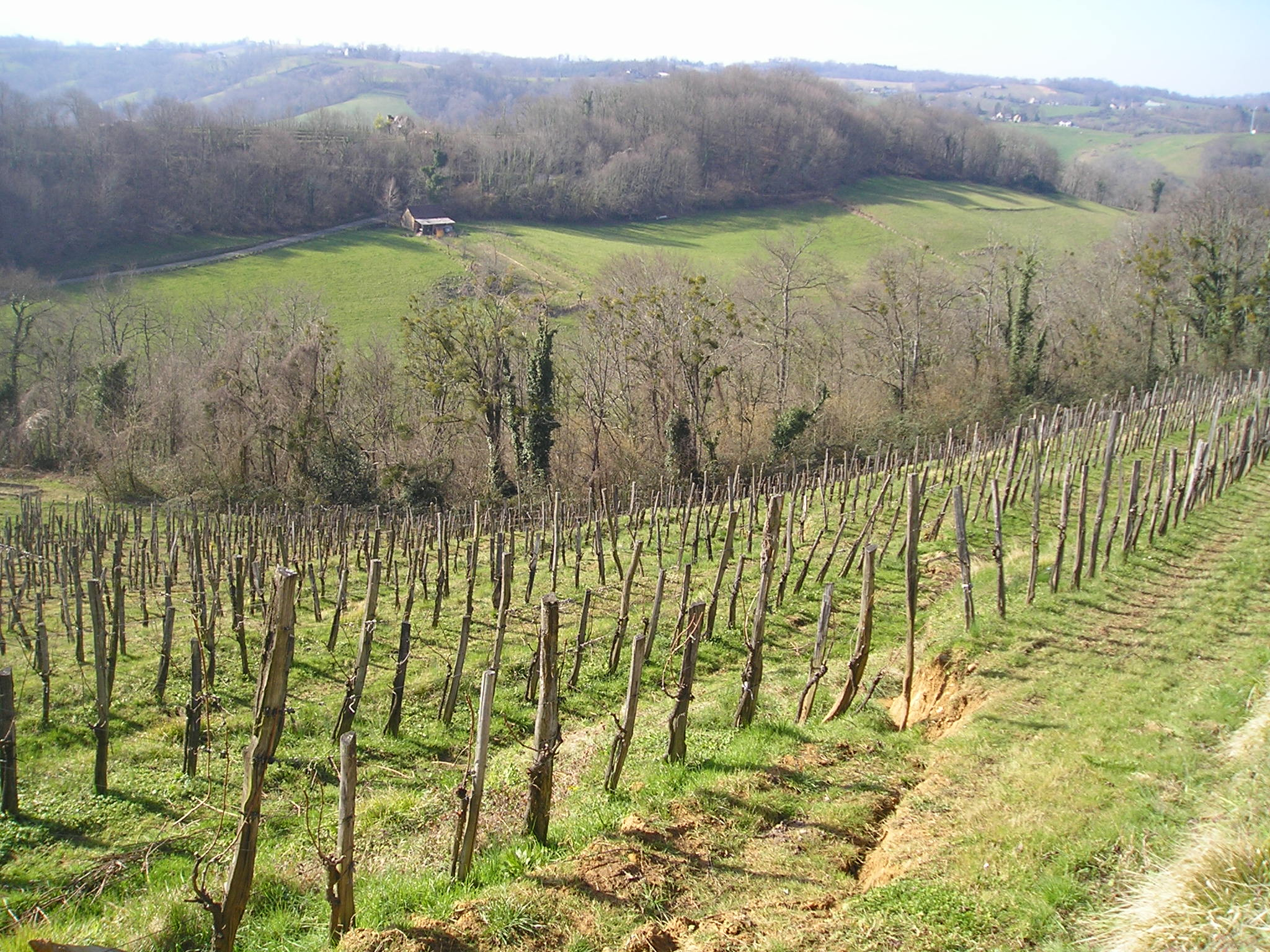
The Jurançon region located in the Pyrénées-Atlantiques department where Camaraou noir has historically been grown.

Ampelographers believe that the name Camaraou derives from the Béarnese word camarau which may have, in turn, be derived itself from the Gascon word cama that means "leg, trunk" and could be a reference to viticultural practice of growing grapevines up trees as trellising. Another possibility is that the name has some connection to the commune of Camalès located in the Hautes-Pyrénées department of southwestern France.

A late 18th century document shows that a Camarau grape was growing in the Pyrénées-Atlantiques department, French Basque Country and in the País Vasco region of northern Spain, however the description of this grapes seems to indicate that it was more likely the white Camaraou blanc (Camaralet de Lasseube) grape. The first mention that was definitively of Camaraou noir was in Viala & Vermorel catalogue of grape varieties produced from 1901 to 1910 by the French ampelographers Pierre Viala and Victor Vermorel.

== Viticulture ==
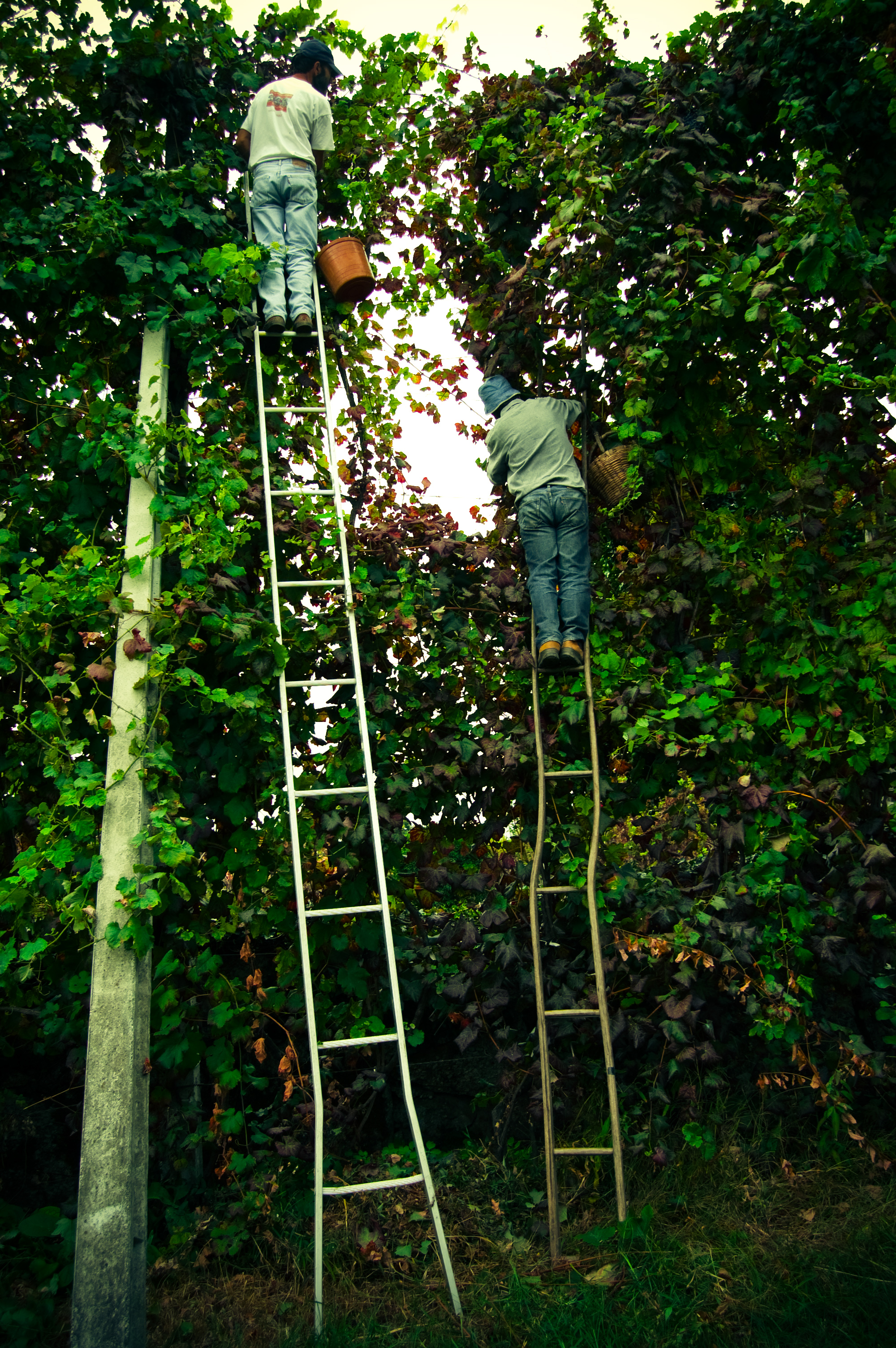
Historically Camaraou noir vines have been trained to grow up tree trunks for support. This is an old viticultural practice that dates back to Roman days but is still practices in some parts of the world such as in the Minho region (pictured) where Vinho Verde is produced.

Camaraou noir is a late-ripening variety that can be very vigorous and high yielding if not kept in check by winter pruning or green harvesting. The vine tends to produce small berries but as part of very large, compact clusters that can be susceptible to various viticultural hazards like mildew. Traditionally Camaraou noir is trained up tree trunks, an ancient practice that dates back to Roman winemaking days.

== Wine regions ==
While Camaraou noir is still a permitted variety in the Appellation d'Origine Contrôlée (AOC) wines of Jurançon and Béarn, the vine is very rarely planted there.

Today most of the world's Camaraou noir vines can be found in the northwestern Spanish wine region of Galicia where the grape is a permitted grape variety in the Denominación de Origen (DO) wines of Rías Baixas. Here the grape is known as Espadeiro and Caíño Redondo with a long history of being grown in the Pontevedra and Ourense provinces. In 2008, there were 137 hectares (339 acres) of Camaraou noir growing in Galicia where it was mostly blended with Mencía and Caíño tinto.

== Relationship to other grapes ==
Due to similarities in synonyms, Camaraou noir is often confused for the Portuguese wine grape Espadeiro but DNA analysis in 2003 confirmed that the two varieties are separate and that most of the Espadeiro grown in Galicia, as well as another variety known as Caiño Redondo, were in fact Camaraou noir.

DNA profiling has also clarified the relationship between Camaraou noir and Camaralet de Lasseube (also known as Camaraou blanc) showing the two varieties to be related but distinct and not color mutations. Both grapes appear to also related to the Jurançon grapes Ahumat, Arrouya noir and Penouille.

== Synonyms ==
Over the years Camaraou noir has been known under a variety of synonyms including: Caiño Redondo, Camaralet noir, Camaran, Camaras, Camarau, Camaraue rouge, Gros noir, Moustardet and Sparse Menue.
