= Canton of Billère et Coteaux de Jurançon =

Coordinates: 43.30°N 0.40°W

The canton of Billère et Coteaux de Jurançon is an administrative division of the Pyrénées-Atlantiques department, southwestern France. It was created at the French canton reorganisation which came into effect in March 2015. Its seat is in Billère.

It consists of the following communes:

1. Aubertin
2. Billère
3. Jurançon
4. Laroin
5. Saint-Faust
