= Canton of Lescar, Gave et Terres du Pont-Long =

Coordinates: 43.31°N 0.41°W

The canton of Lescar, Gave et Terres du Pont-Long is an administrative division of the Pyrénées-Atlantiques department, southwestern France. It was created at the French canton reorganisation which came into effect in March 2015. Its seat is in Lons.

It consists of the following communes:

1. Arbus
2. Artiguelouve
3. Lescar
4. Lons
5. Poey-de-Lescar
6. Siros
7. Uzein
