= Arrouya noir =

Variety of grape

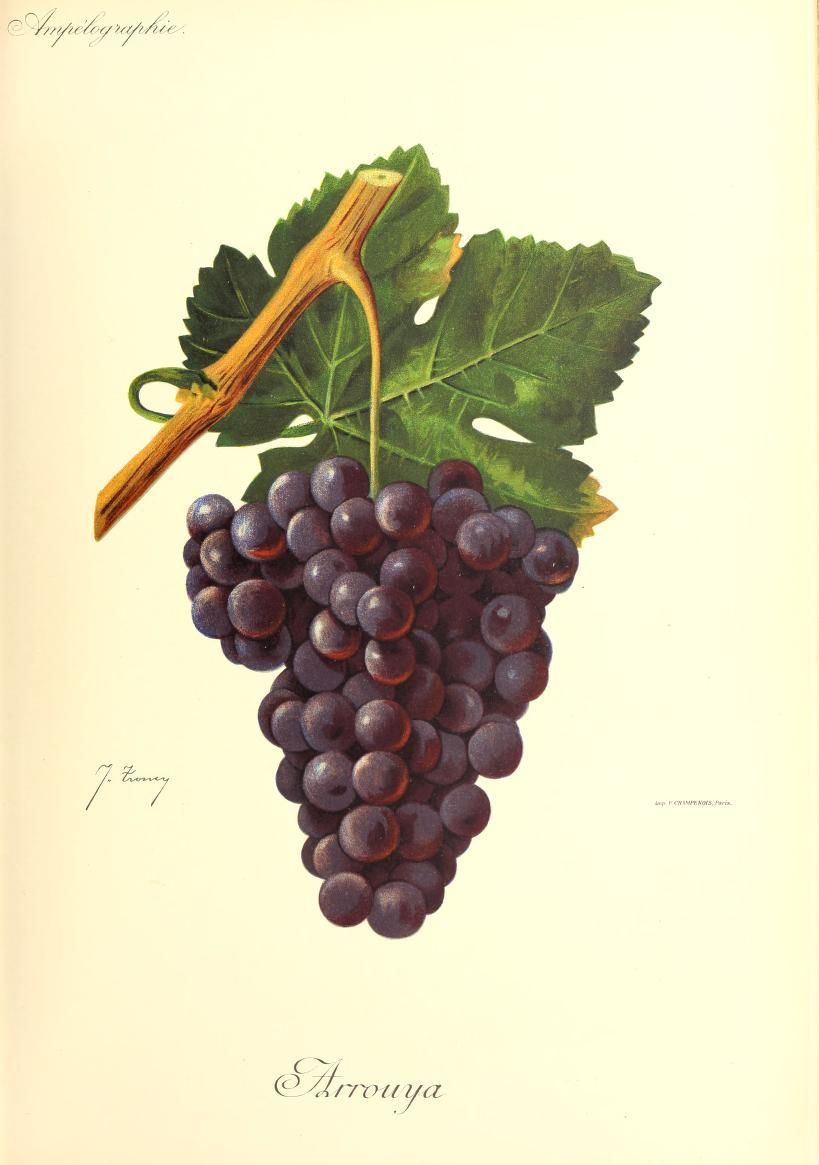

Arrouya noir is a red French wine grape variety grown in the Jurançon region of Southwest France. The grape has a long history in the region, growing in the Pyrénées-Atlantiques since at least the late 18th century. Ampelographers believe that Arrouya noir has some genetic relationship with Camaraou noir, Fer and Petit Courbu though the exact nature of those relationships is not yet known. The variety also shares some similarities in morphology with Cabernet Franc and until the late 19th century was often confused for the Loire and Bordeaux wine grape, especially in the Basses-Pyrénées and Hautes-Pyrénées region.

== History and confusion with other grapes ==
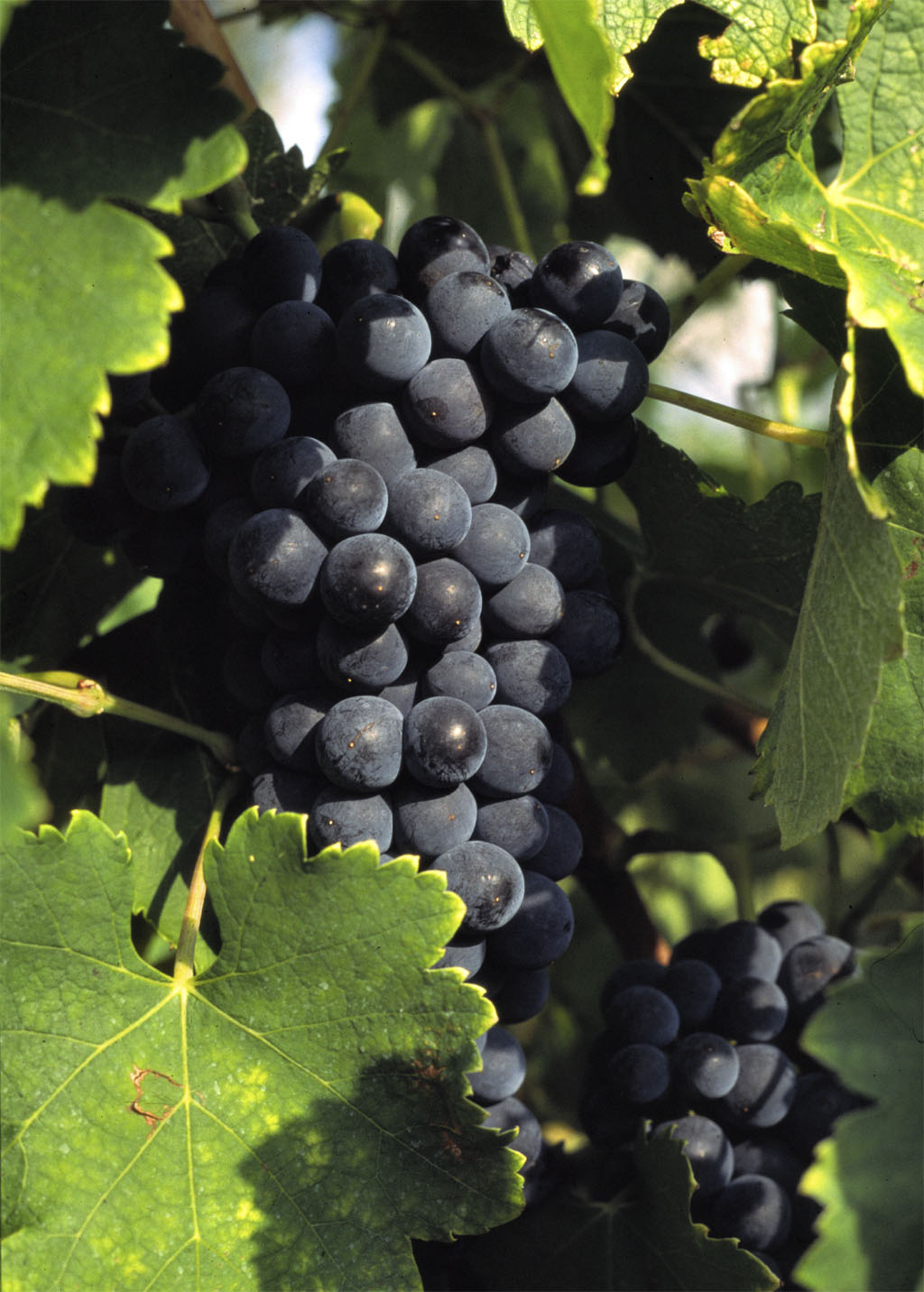
Arrouya noir is often confused with another red wine grape grown in the Southwest France, Fer (pictured).

The name Arrouya is believed to come from the word arroy which means "red" in the Béarnese dialect. The grape has been growing the Pyrénées-Atlantiques since at least the late 18th century where it was mentioned in 1783 document as being a late-ripening variety.

Up until the late 19th century, plantings of Arrouya noir among vineyards in the foothills of the Pyrénées were misidentified as Cabernet Franc. Even today the grape is sometimes confused for Cabernet Franc or other red grape varieties of Southwest France including Fer and Manseng noir.

== Viticulture ==
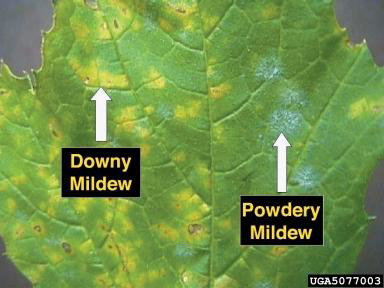
Among the viticultural hazards that Arrouya noir vines are susceptible too is downy mildew (pictured left).

Arrouya noir is a late-ripening grape variety that can be very vigorous and high yielding if not kept in check by winter pruning and late season green harvesting. It's late-ripening nature means that it can be very sensitive to the conditions of a vintage and may not reach full physiological ripeness every year. The vine tends to produce small, compact bunches that are vulnerable to infections by botrytis bunch rot. Other viticultural hazards that Arrouya noir is susceptible to include black rot and downy mildew.

== Wine regions ==
While Arrouya noir is permitted to be planted throughout the Pyrénées-Atlantiques department, it is not widely grown and is mostly limited to the Jurançon region where it is often found in field blends along with Camaraou noir in older vineyards.

== Styles ==
According to Master of Wine Jancis Robinson, Arrouya noir tends to produce pale-colored red wines that have noticeable levels of acidity and astringency.

== Synonyms ==
Over the years, Arrouya noir has been known under a variety of synonyms including: Arhuya, Aroyat, Arrouyat, Arroya, Arruya, Dourec noir (in Béarn), Eremachaoua (in Béarn), Erematxahua (in French Basque Country), Rouja and Vieux rouge.
