= Lons =

- Commune
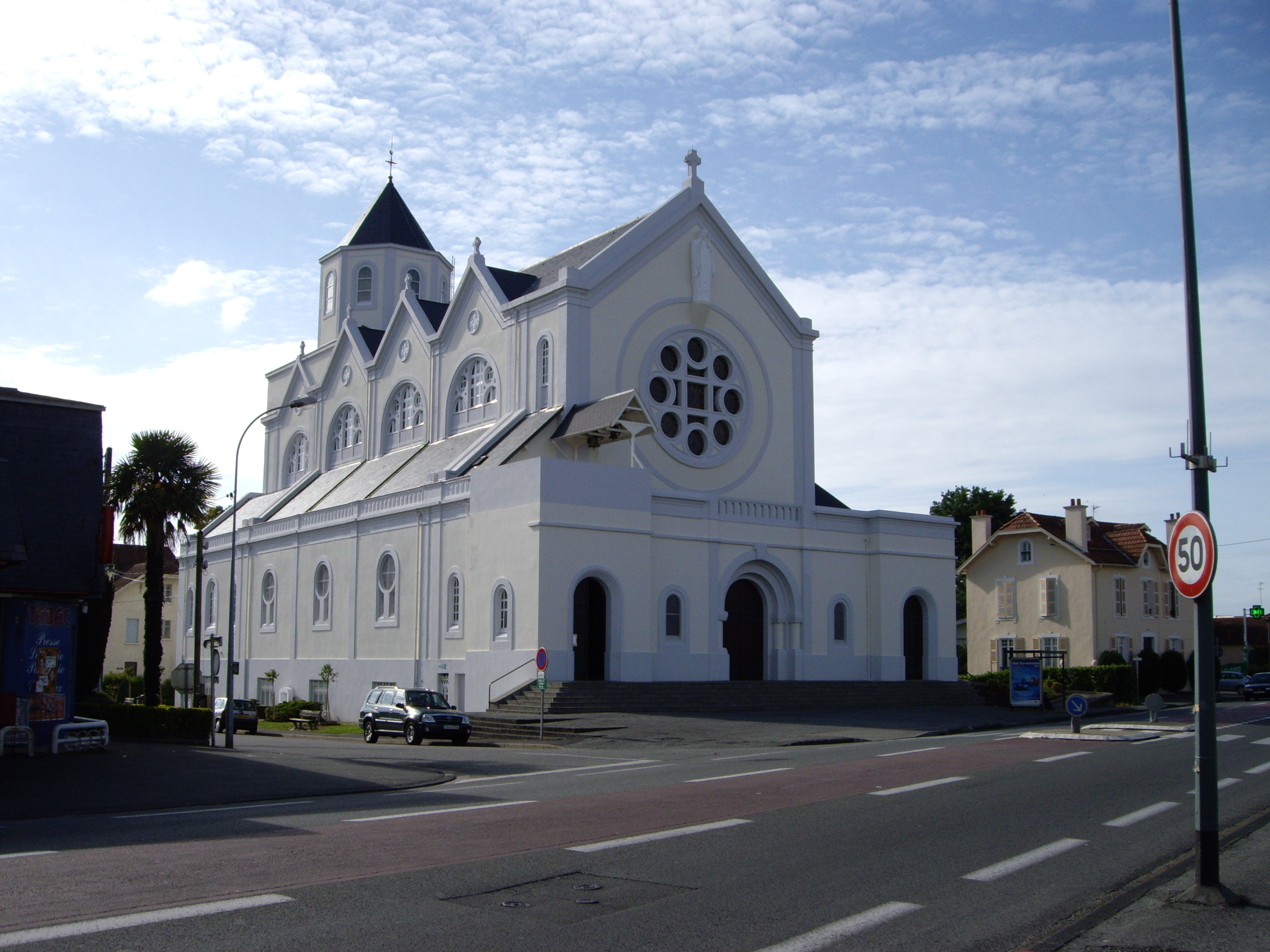
- The church of Lons

- Coat of arms
- Location of Lons
- Location within France Location within Nouvelle-Aquitaine
- Coordinates: 43°18′57″N 0°24′34″W
- Country: France
- Region: Nouvelle-Aquitaine
- Department: Pyrénées-Atlantiques
- Arrondissement: Pau
- Canton: Lescar, Gave et Terres du Pont-Long
- Intercommunality: CA Pau Béarn Pyrénées

Government
  - Mayor (2020–2026): Nicolas Patriarche
- Area^{1}: 11.53 km^{2} (4.45 sq mi)
- Elevation: 162 m (531 ft)
- Highest elevation: 207 m (679 ft)
- Lowest elevation: 158 m (518 ft)
- Population (2023): 13,606
  - Density: 1,180/km^{2} (3,056/sq mi)
- Time zone: UTC+01:00 (CET)
  - Summer (DST): UTC+02:00 (CEST)
- INSEE/Postal code: 64348 /64140
- ^{1} French Land Register data, which excludes lakes, ponds, glaciers > 1 km^{2} (0.386 sq mi or 247 acres) and river estuaries.

Lons (French pronunciation: [lɔ̃s]) is a commune in the Pyrénées-Atlantiques department in south-western France. It is a northwestern suburb of Pau.

== Population ==
Historical population
Year	Pop.	±% p.a.
1968	2,980	—
1975	3,365	+1.75%
1982	6,717	+10.38%
1990	9,254	+4.09%
1999	11,154	+2.10%
2007	11,926	+0.84%
2012	12,068	+0.24%
2017	13,374	+2.08%
2023	13,606	+0.29%
Source: INSEE

== See also ==
- Communes of the Pyrénées-Atlantiques department
