= Poey-de-Lescar =

- Commune
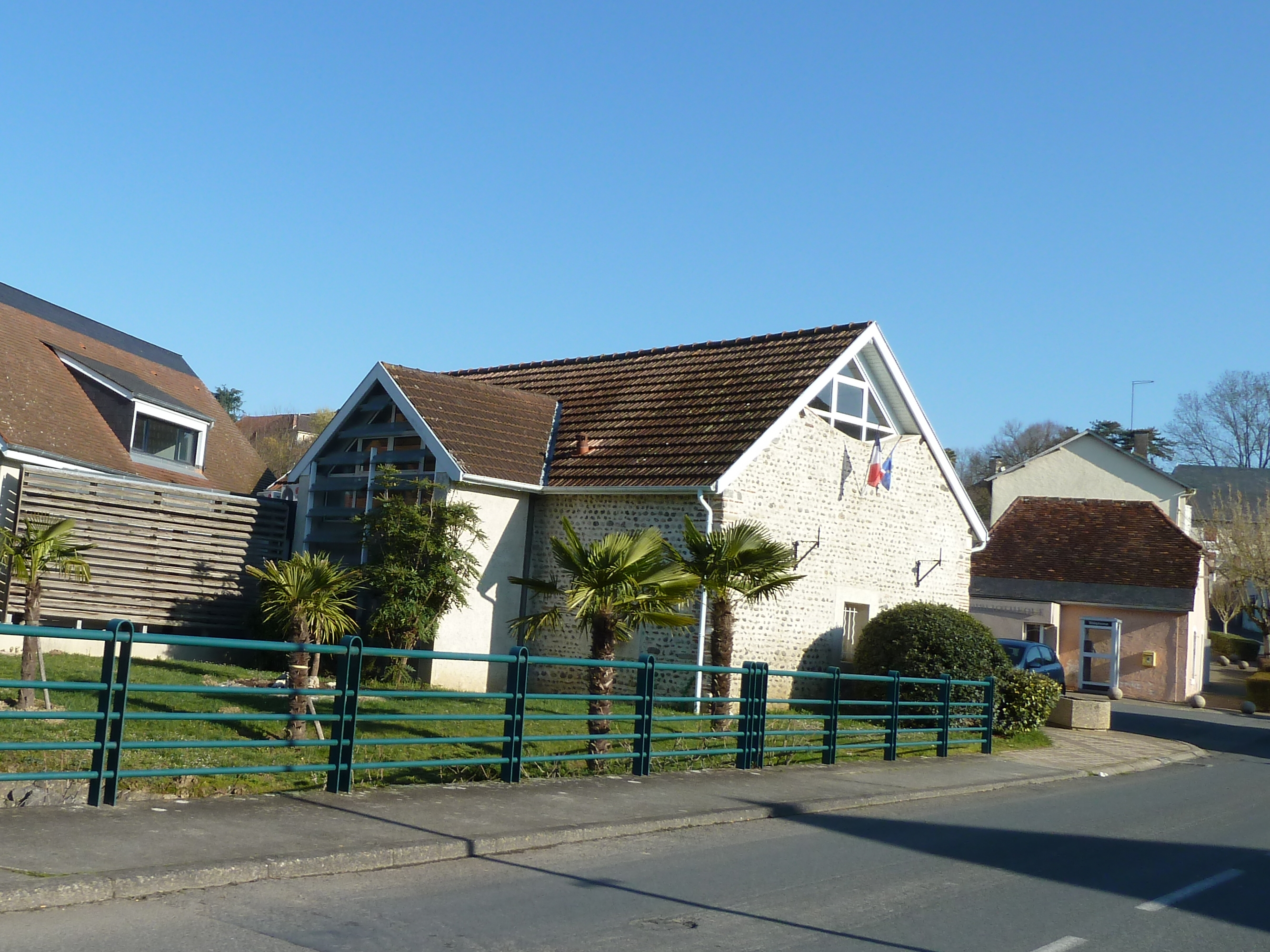
- The town hall of Poey-de-Lescar
- Location of Poey-de-Lescar
- Location within France Location within Nouvelle-Aquitaine
- Coordinates: 43°21′05″N 0°28′06″W
- Country: France
- Region: Nouvelle-Aquitaine
- Department: Pyrénées-Atlantiques
- Arrondissement: Pau
- Canton: Lescar, Gave et Terres du Pont-Long
- Intercommunality: CA Pau Béarn Pyrénées

Government
  - Mayor (2020–2026): Pierre Soler
- Area^{1}: 6.74 km^{2} (2.60 sq mi)
- Elevation: 150 m (490 ft)
- Highest elevation: 185 m (607 ft)
- Lowest elevation: 138 m (453 ft)
- Population (2023): 1,876
  - Density: 278/km^{2} (721/sq mi)
- Time zone: UTC+01:00 (CET)
  - Summer (DST): UTC+02:00 (CEST)
- INSEE/Postal code: 64448 /64230
- ^{1} French Land Register data, which excludes lakes, ponds, glaciers > 1 km^{2} (0.386 sq mi or 247 acres) and river estuaries.

Poey-de-Lescar (French pronunciation: [pɔɛ də lɛskaʁ], literally Poey of Lescar; Occitan: Puei de Lescar) is a commune in the Pyrénées-Atlantiques department in south-western France.

== See also ==
- Communes of the Pyrénées-Atlantiques department
