= Billère =

- Commune
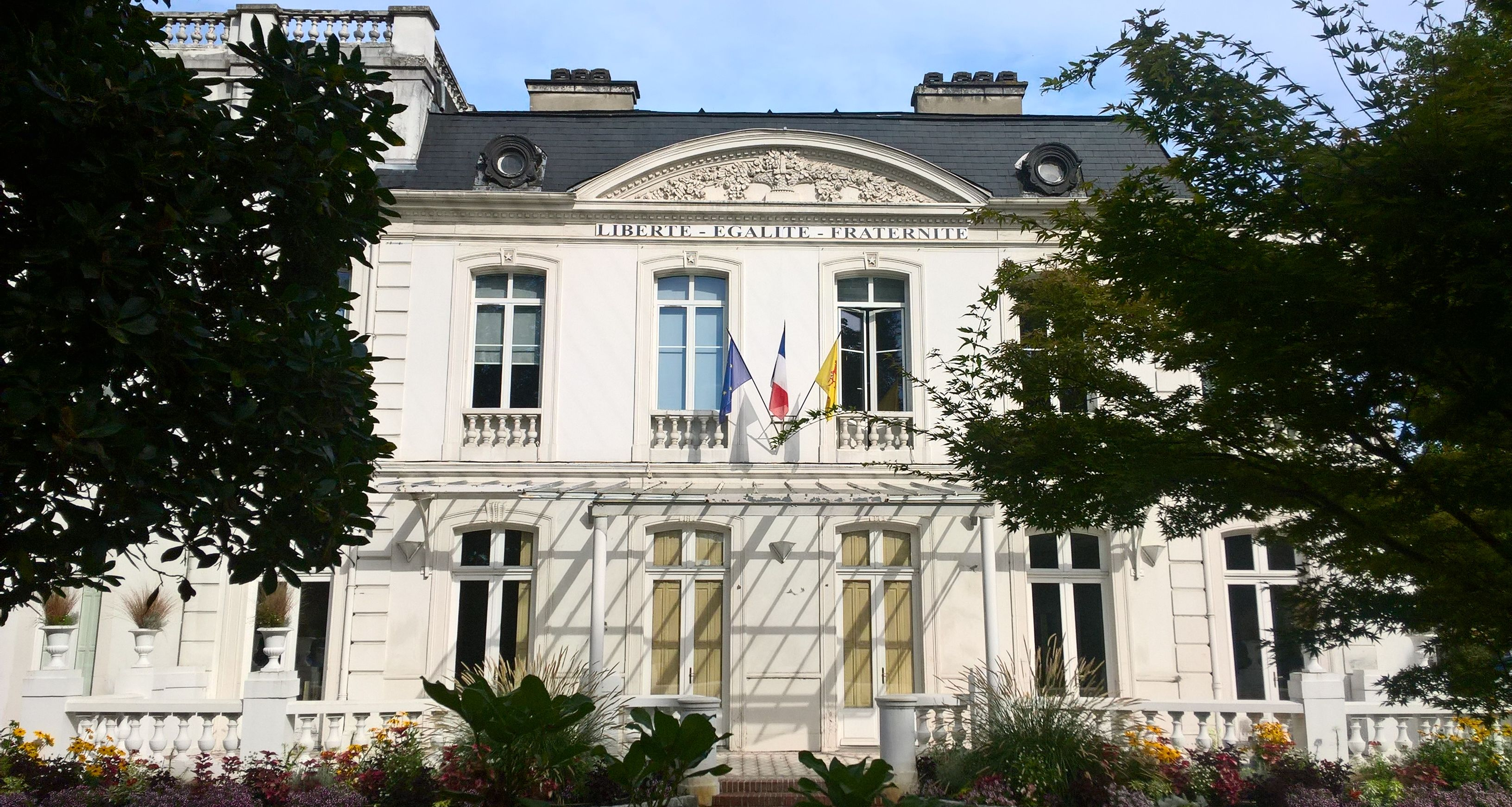
- The town hall of Billère
- Location of Billère
- Location within France Location within Nouvelle-Aquitaine
- Coordinates: 43°18′11″N 0°23′26″W
- Country: France
- Region: Nouvelle-Aquitaine
- Department: Pyrénées-Atlantiques
- Arrondissement: Pau
- Canton: Billère et Coteaux de Jurançon
- Intercommunality: CA Pau Béarn Pyrénées

Government
  - Mayor (2024–2026): Arnaud Jacottin
- Area^{1}: 4.57 km^{2} (1.76 sq mi)
- Highest elevation: 205 m (673 ft)
- Lowest elevation: 159 m (522 ft)
- Population (2023): 14,384
  - Density: 3,150/km^{2} (8,150/sq mi)
- Time zone: UTC+01:00 (CET)
  - Summer (DST): UTC+02:00 (CEST)
- INSEE/Postal code: 64129 /64140
- ^{1} French Land Register data, which excludes lakes, ponds, glaciers > 1 km^{2} (0.386 sq mi or 247 acres) and river estuaries.

Billère (French pronunciation: [bijɛʁ]; Occitan: Vilhèra) is a commune in the Pyrénées-Atlantiques department in southwestern France. It is a northwestern suburb of Pau.

== Population ==
Historical population
Year	Pop.	±% p.a.
1968	13,382	—
1975	14,657	+1.31%
1982	13,138	−1.55%
1990	12,570	−0.55%
1999	13,398	+0.71%
2007	13,462	+0.06%
2012	13,367	−0.14%
2017	12,804	−0.86%
2023	14,384	+1.96%
Source: INSEE

== See also ==
- Communes of the Pyrénées-Atlantiques department
