= Laroin =

- Commune
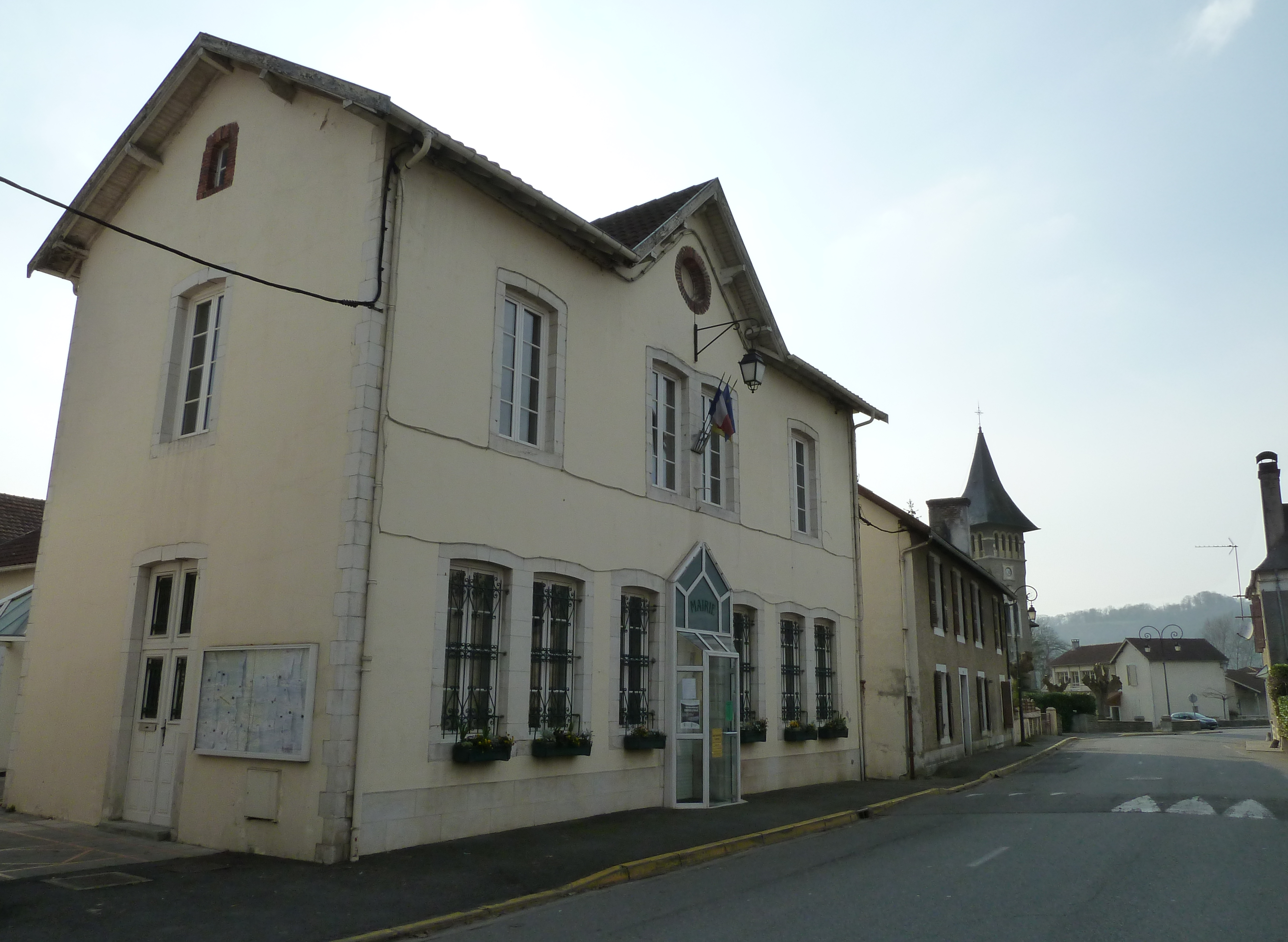
- The town hall of Laroin

- Coat of arms
- Location of Laroin
- Location within France Location within Nouvelle-Aquitaine
- Coordinates: 43°18′20″N 0°26′26″W
- Country: France
- Region: Nouvelle-Aquitaine
- Department: Pyrénées-Atlantiques
- Arrondissement: Pau
- Canton: Billère et Coteaux de Jurançon
- Intercommunality: CA Pau Béarn Pyrénées

Government
  - Mayor (2020–2026): Bernard Marque
- Area^{1}: 7.04 km^{2} (2.72 sq mi)
- Elevation: 254 m (833 ft)
- Highest elevation: 312 m (1,024 ft)
- Lowest elevation: 151 m (495 ft)
- Population (2023): 1,030
  - Density: 146/km^{2} (379/sq mi)
- Time zone: UTC+01:00 (CET)
  - Summer (DST): UTC+02:00 (CEST)
- INSEE/Postal code: 64315 /64110
- ^{1} French Land Register data, which excludes lakes, ponds, glaciers > 1 km^{2} (0.386 sq mi or 247 acres) and river estuaries.

Laroin (French pronunciation: [laʁwɛ̃]; Occitan: Laruenh) is a commune in the Pyrénées-Atlantiques department in south-western France.

== See also ==
- Communes of the Pyrénées-Atlantiques department
