= Lescar =

- Commune
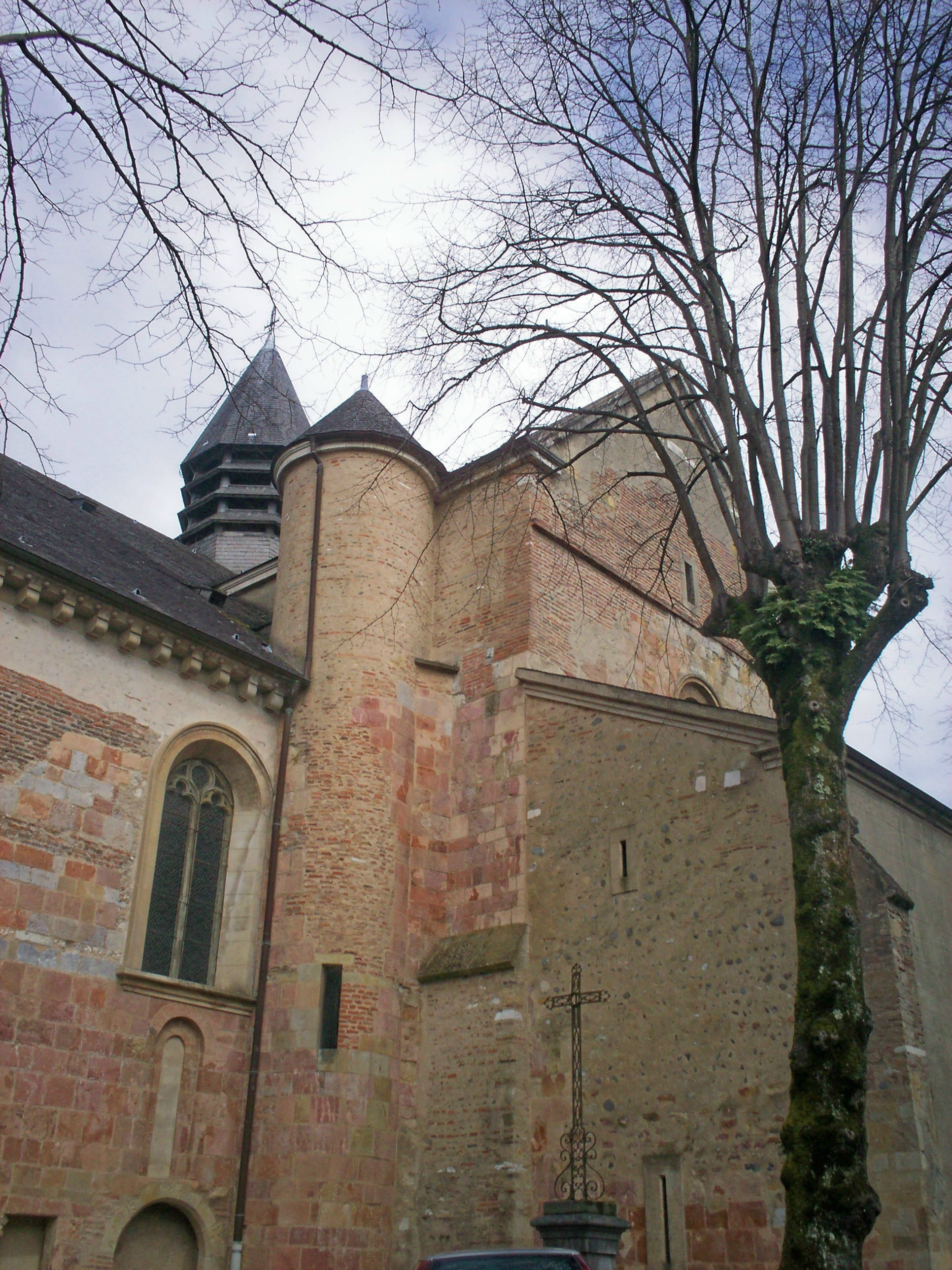
- Cathedral

- Coat of arms
- Location of Lescar
- Location within France Location within Nouvelle-Aquitaine
- Coordinates: 43°20′01″N 0°26′05″W
- Country: France
- Region: Nouvelle-Aquitaine
- Department: Pyrénées-Atlantiques
- Arrondissement: Pau
- Canton: Lescar, Gave et Terres du Pont-Long
- Intercommunality: CA Pau Béarn Pyrénées

Government
  - Mayor (2020–2026): Valérie Revel
- Area^{1}: 27 km^{2} (10 sq mi)
- Elevation: 154 m (505 ft)
- Highest elevation: 203 m (666 ft)
- Lowest elevation: 142 m (466 ft)
- Population (2023): 9,455
  - Density: 350/km^{2} (910/sq mi)
- Time zone: UTC+01:00 (CET)
  - Summer (DST): UTC+02:00 (CEST)
- INSEE/Postal code: 64335 /64230
- ^{1} French Land Register data, which excludes lakes, ponds, glaciers > 1 km^{2} (0.386 sq mi or 247 acres) and river estuaries.

Lescar (French pronunciation: [lɛskaʁ]; Occitan: Lescar) is a commune in the Pyrénées-Atlantiques department and Nouvelle-Aquitaine region of south-western France.

Lescar is the site of the Roman city known variously as Benearnum, Beneharnum or Civitas Benarnensium, the location providing the name for the later region of Béarn.

In 841, Benearnum was razed by the Vikings and Morlaàs became the Béarnaise capital. However, from the twelfth century a new city grew up at Lescar. Lescar Cathedral was built during this period, and was the seat of the Diocese of Lescar until 1801. The remains of the last monarchs of all Navarre Queen Catherine I (†1517) and King John III (†1516) lie at the cathedral.

Today, Lescar is primarily a suburb of the nearby town of Pau. The commune of Lescar has joined together with 30 neighbouring communes to establish the Communauté d'agglomération Pau Béarn Pyrénées which provides a framework within which local tasks are carried out together.

== Population ==
Historical population

Year	Pop.	±% p.a.
1793	1,948	—
1800	1,710	−1.84%
1806	1,611	−0.99%
1821	1,781	+0.67%
1831	2,093	+1.63%
1836	1,938	−1.53%
1841	2,096	+1.58%
1846	2,014	−0.79%
1851	1,940	−0.75%
1856	1,877	−0.66%
1861	1,776	−1.10%
1866	1,827	+0.57%
1872	1,807	−0.18%
1876	1,855	+0.66%
1881	1,791	−0.70%
1886	1,794	+0.03%
1891	1,645	−1.72%
1896	1,630	−0.18%
1901	1,554	−0.95%

Year	Pop.	±% p.a.
1906	1,522	−0.42%
1911	1,482	−0.53%
1921	1,471	−0.07%
1926	1,661	+2.46%
1931	1,871	+2.41%
1936	1,750	−1.33%
1946	1,576	−1.04%
1954	1,855	+2.06%
1962	2,194	+2.12%
1968	2,953	+5.08%
1975	4,164	+5.03%
1982	5,186	+3.19%
1990	5,793	+1.39%
1999	8,191	+3.92%
2007	9,749	+2.20%
2012	9,995	+0.50%
2017	9,804	−0.39%
2023	9,455	−0.60%

Source: EHESS and INSEE (1968-2023)

== Twin towns ==
- L'Alfàs del Pi, Spain

== See also ==
- Communes of the Pyrénées-Atlantiques department
