= Église Saint-Girons =

Coordinates: 43°19′12″N 0°34′46″W

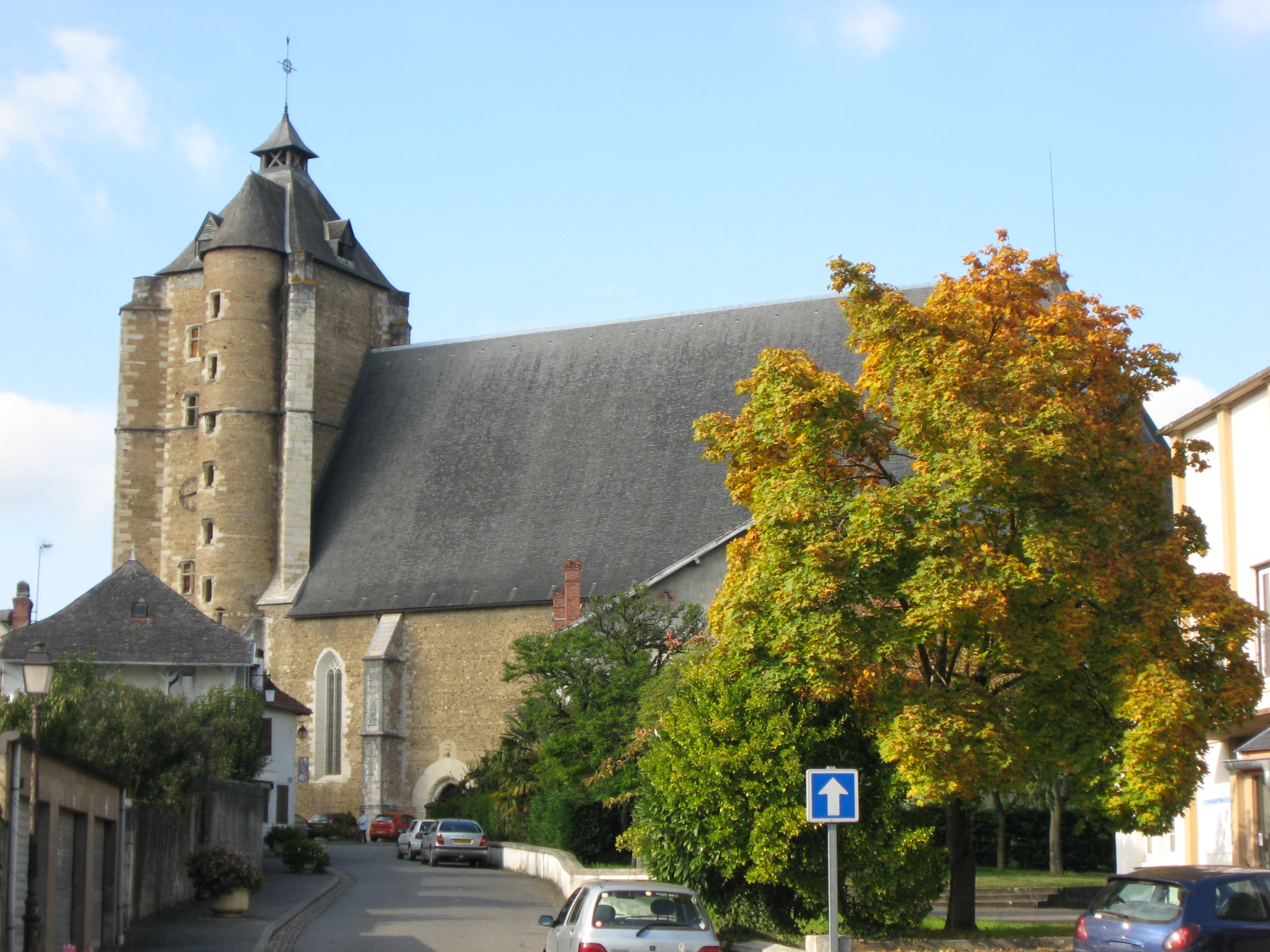
Église Saint-Girons

L'église Saint-Girons (English: Saint-Girons Church; Béarnese Occitan: glèisa de Sent Gironç) is a Roman Catholic church located in the commune of Monein in Pyrénées-Atlantiques, Aquitaine. The edifice is in the Gothic architectural style. It was classified as a monument historique of France on 7 August 1913. Its grand size made it the largest Gothic church in Béarn in the 15th century. It is most famous for its heart of oak frame which represents the Medieval architecture style.

== History ==
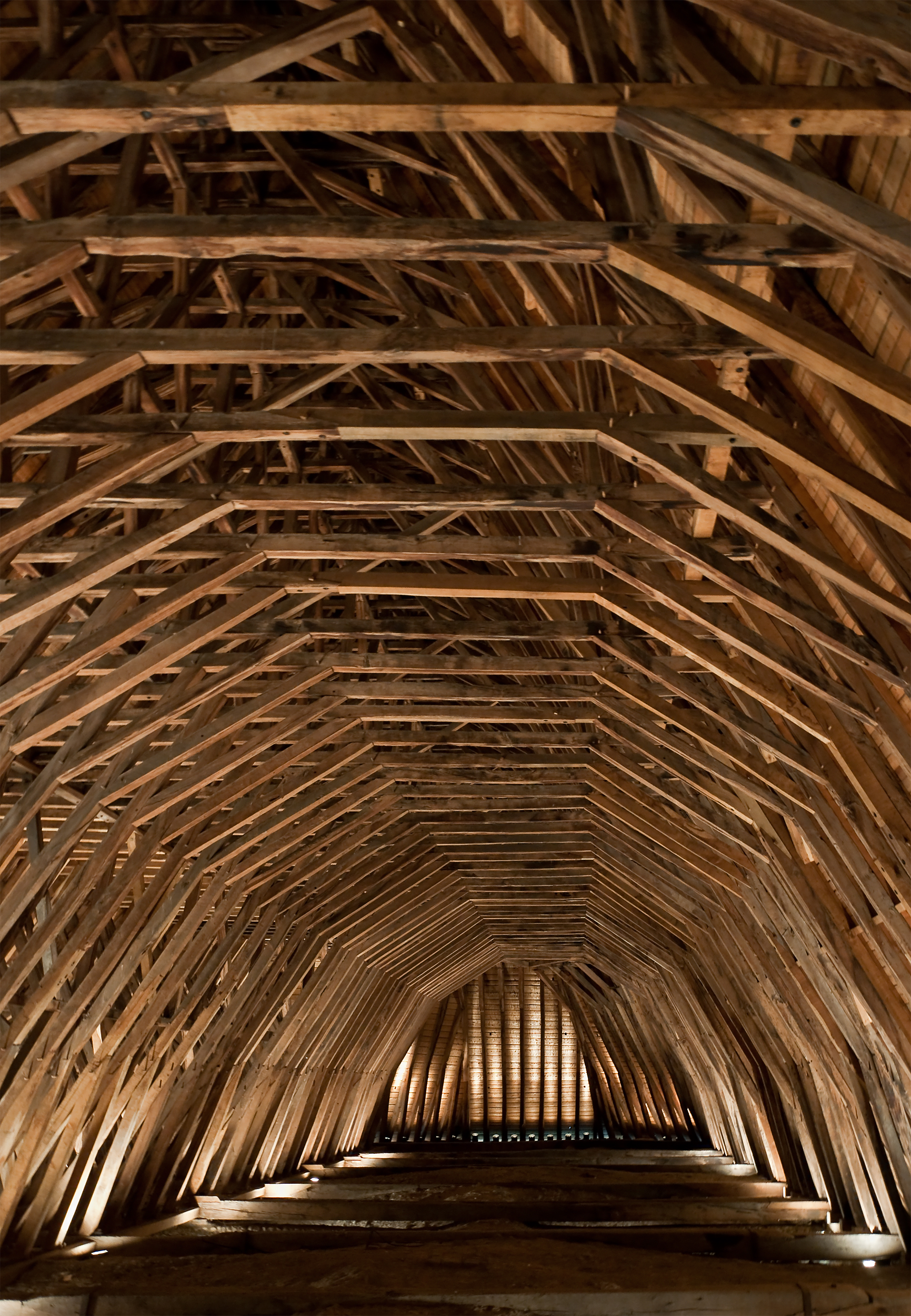
Heart of oak frame inside the church, representing Medieval architecture. It is now a tourist attraction

=== Construction ===
In the 16th century, Monein was a growing village with over 5,000 residents, or 850 fires; (hoec vius in official Béarnese documents at the time), whereas in Pau there were only about 700 residents, as shown by the dénombrements (census for taxation purposes) in Béarn. The old Romanesque church Sant-Pée (Occitan: Sent Pèr, equivalent to Saint-Pierre) became too small for the residents, so it was decided to build a larger church next to the Lay Abbey (which no longer exists).

Monein was also a very rich village as it paid more taxes than Orthez and Oloron together, and it was one of the largest communes in Béarn because it was composed of the villages of Cuqueron and Cardesse.

Finally, the residents had religious life styles because there were 9 confraternities and 16 priests in Monein at the time.

The size of the new church should be proportional to the wealth of the village; the Église Saint-Girons of Monein is over 61 m (200 ft) long, 16 m (52.5 ft) wide and 31 m (102 ft) high. It is larger than the two cathedrals of Béarn, the Lescar Cathedral (Cathédrale Notre-Dame-de-l'Assomption de Lescar) in Lescar and the Oloron Cathedral (Cathédrale Sainte-Marie d'Oloron) in Oloron-Sainte-Marie.

Construction of the church began in 1464 and was completed in 1530. During the 70 years of construction, residents paid for the work through numerous taxes, with the local Cagots building the church.

=== Others ===
Queen Jeanne d'Albret of Navarre transformed the church into a Protestant church, however the church returned to Catholicism under the Édit d'intégration du Béarn (Edict of Integration of Béarn), promulgated by King Louis XIII of France (who was also Louis II of Navarre at that time). The church was then refurnished and it still retains a large Baroque-style altarpiece and 17th century organs from Toulouse today.

The Église Saint-Girons was restored in the late 20th and early 21st centuries. Its heart of oak frame is now a tourist attraction.

== Gallery ==
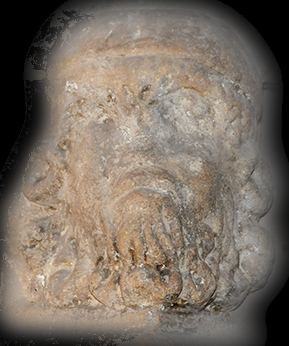
Sculpture of a "Cagot" in the church.

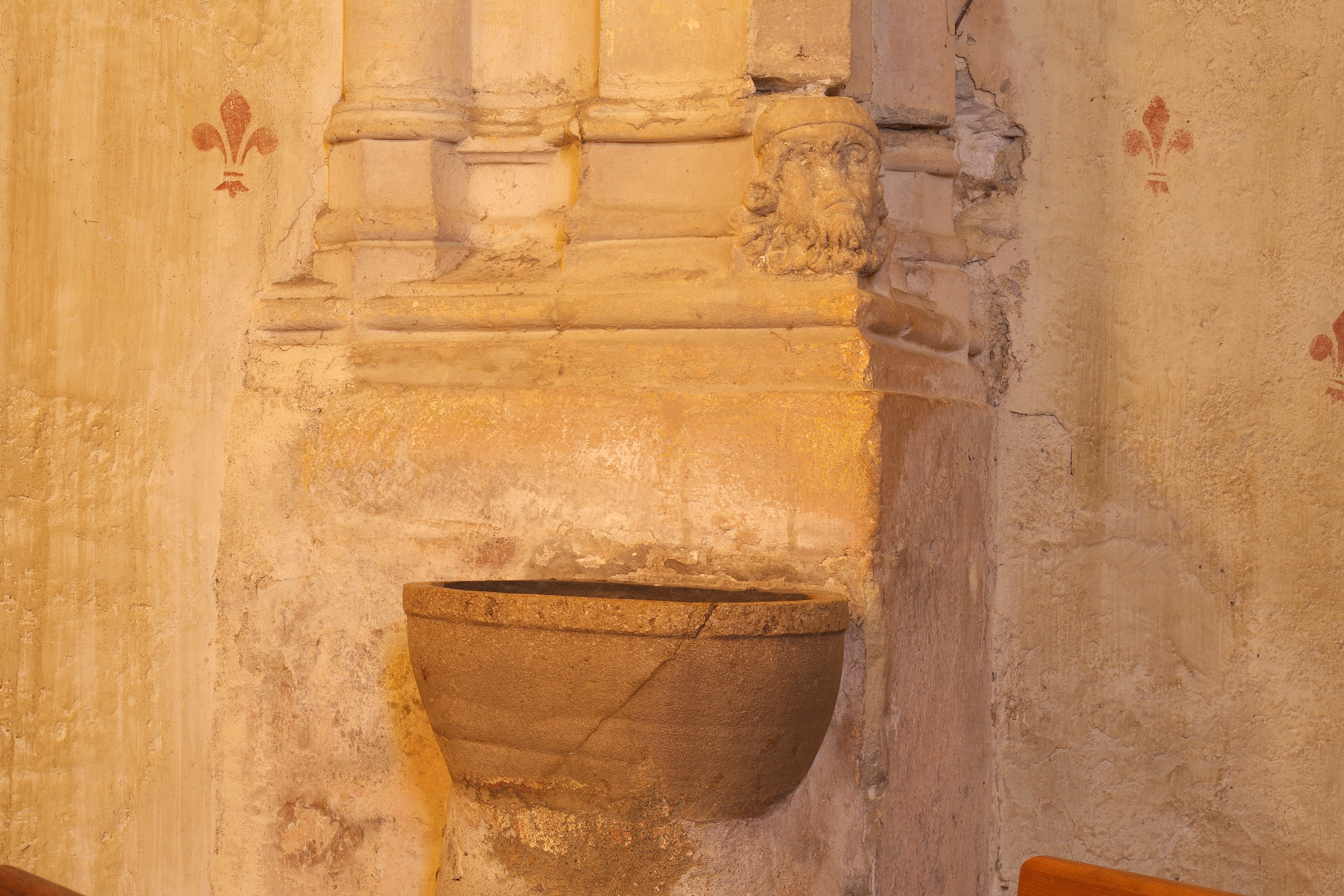
Font for Cagots in the church, with a small sculpture of what is presumed to be a Cagot.

== See also ==
- Saint Girons
- Monein

== Notes and references ==
=== Bibliography ===
- Duval, Marie-Victoire (1991). Monein, une communauté du Béarn au Moyen Âge et sous l'Ancien Régime [Monein, a community of Béarn in the Middle Ages and under the Ancien Régime] (in French). Monein.
- Couet-Lannes, Lucienne (2006). Visitons l'église de Monein [Let's visit the church of Monein] (in French). Princi Néguer - Monein.
- Raymond, Paul [in French] (1873). Le Béarn sous Gaston PhPhœbus, Dénombrement général des maisons de la Vicomté de Béarn en 1385 [Béarn under Gaston PhPhœbus, General enumeration of the houses of the Viscounty of Béarn in 1385] (in French). Pau.
