= Monein =

- Commune
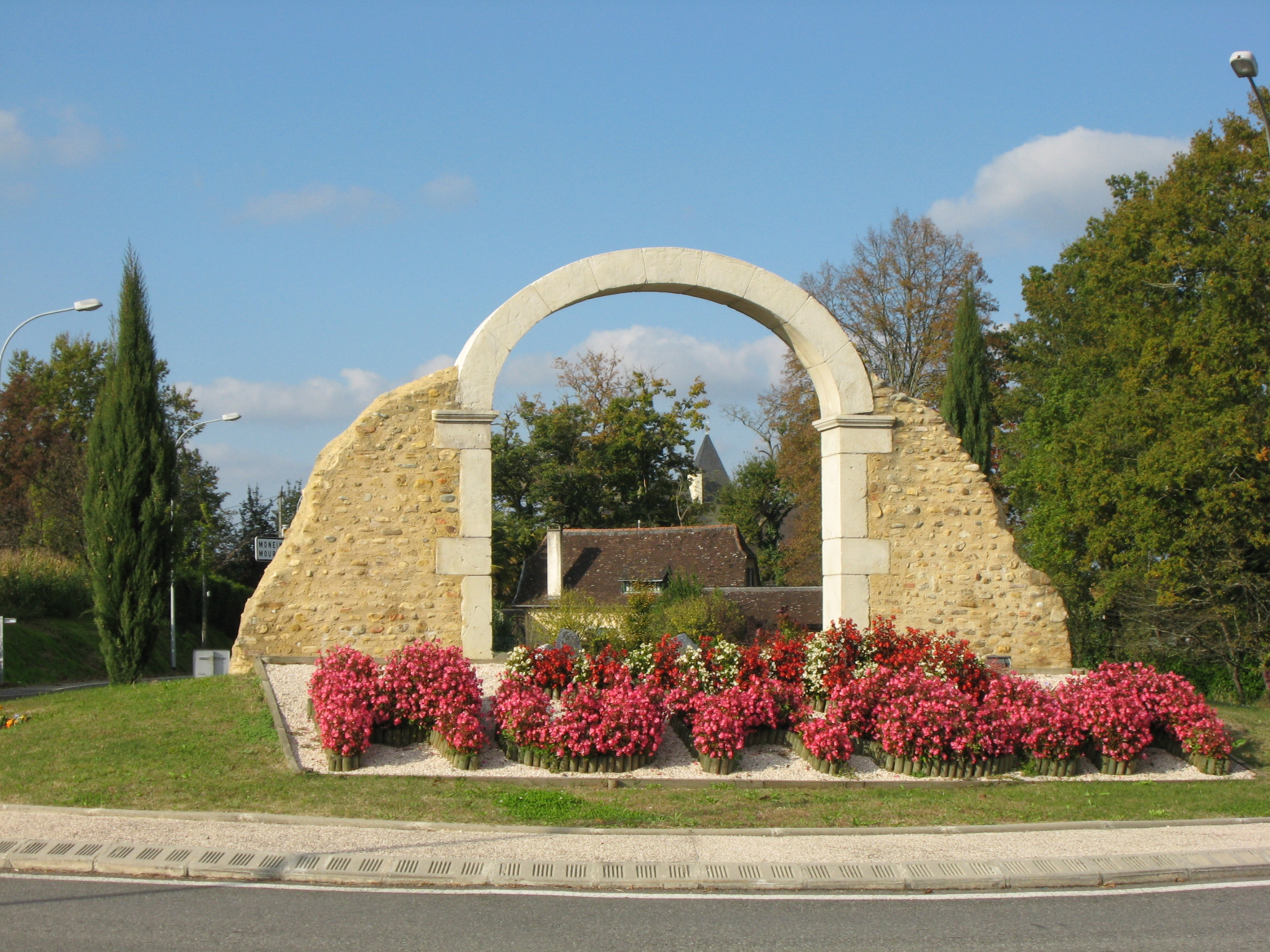
- La route de Monein

- Coat of arms
- Location of Monein
- Location within France Location within Nouvelle-Aquitaine
- Coordinates: 43°19′16″N 0°34′42″W
- Country: France
- Region: Nouvelle-Aquitaine
- Department: Pyrénées-Atlantiques
- Arrondissement: Pau
- Canton: Le Cœur de Béarn
- Intercommunality: Lacq-Orthez

Government
  - Mayor (2020–2026): Bertrand Vergez-Pascal
- Area^{1}: 80.84 km^{2} (31.21 sq mi)
- Elevation: 155 m (509 ft)
- Highest elevation: 357 m (1,171 ft)
- Lowest elevation: 109 m (358 ft)
- Population (2023): 4,446
  - Density: 55.00/km^{2} (142.4/sq mi)
- Time zone: UTC+01:00 (CET)
  - Summer (DST): UTC+02:00 (CEST)
- INSEE/Postal code: 64393 /64360
- Website: http://www.monein.fr/
- ^{1} French Land Register data, which excludes lakes, ponds, glaciers > 1 km^{2} (0.386 sq mi or 247 acres) and river estuaries.

Monein (French pronunciation: [mɔnɛ̃]; Occitan: Monenh) is a commune in the Pyrénées-Atlantiques department in south-western France.

== Geography ==
=== Neighbouring communes ===
- North: Lahourcade and Pardies
- West: Lucq-de-Béarn and Cardesse
- South: Estialescq and Lasseube
- East: Aubertin, Lacommande, Arbus, Cuqueron and Parbayse

== Administration ==
List of mayors of Monein

Name	Political party	In office
Léopold Joly		1977–1983
Maurice Bahurlet	PS	1983–2001
Yves Salanave-Péhé	DVG	2001–2020
Bertrand Vergez-Pascal		2020–incumbent

== Population ==
Historical population
Year	Pop.	±% p.a.
1968	3,967	—
1975	3,865	−0.37%
1982	3,879	+0.05%
1990	4,032	+0.48%
1999	4,183	+0.41%
2007	4,393	+0.61%
2012	4,466	+0.33%
2017	4,438	−0.13%
2023	4,446	+0.03%
Source: INSEE

== Notable people ==
- Jean Sarrailh
- Jean-Patrick Lescarboura
- Marie Bartête (1863-1938), French prisoner

== Gallery ==
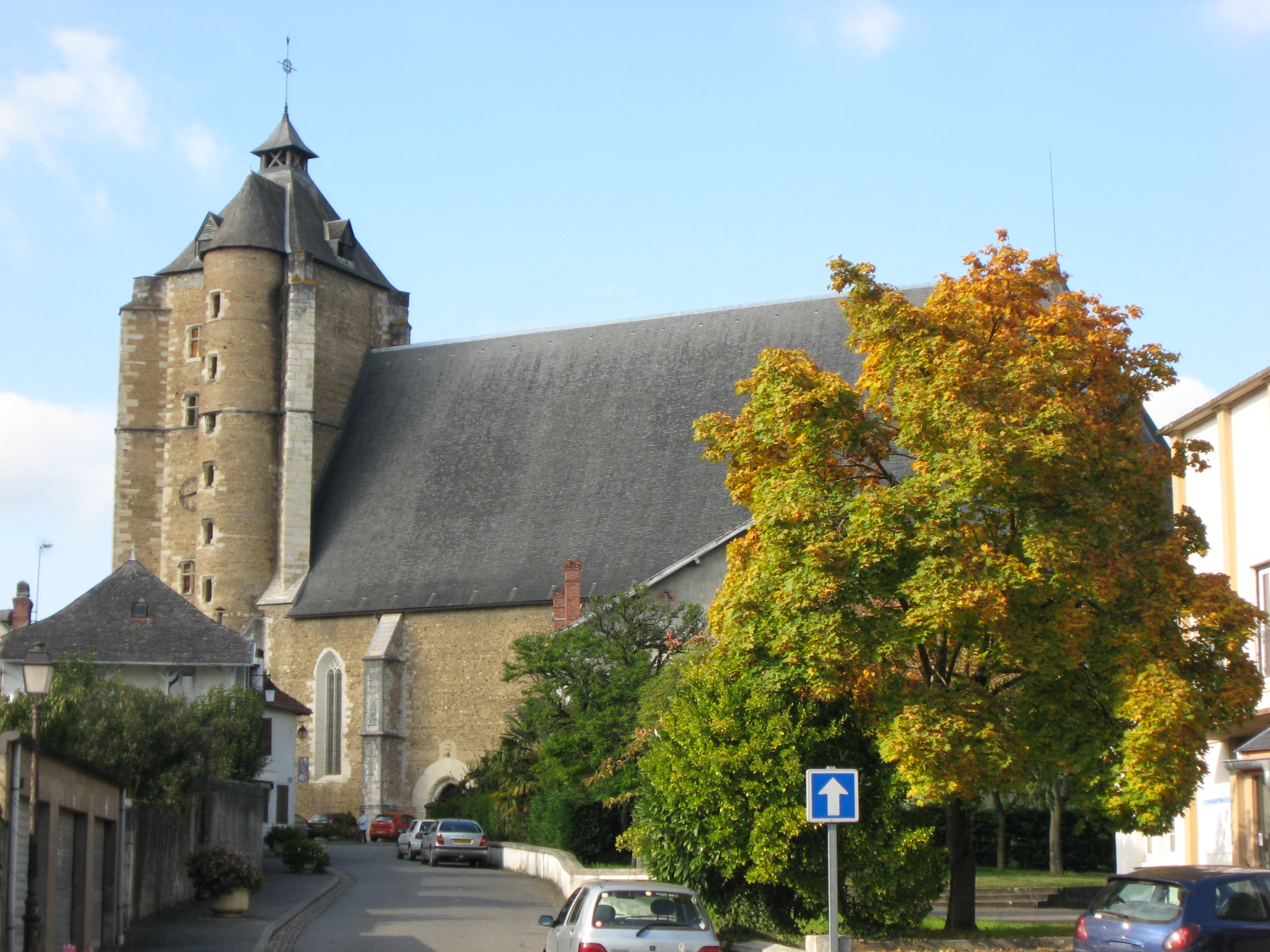
Saint-Girons church in Monein, that was built by the local cagot craftsmen in 1464.

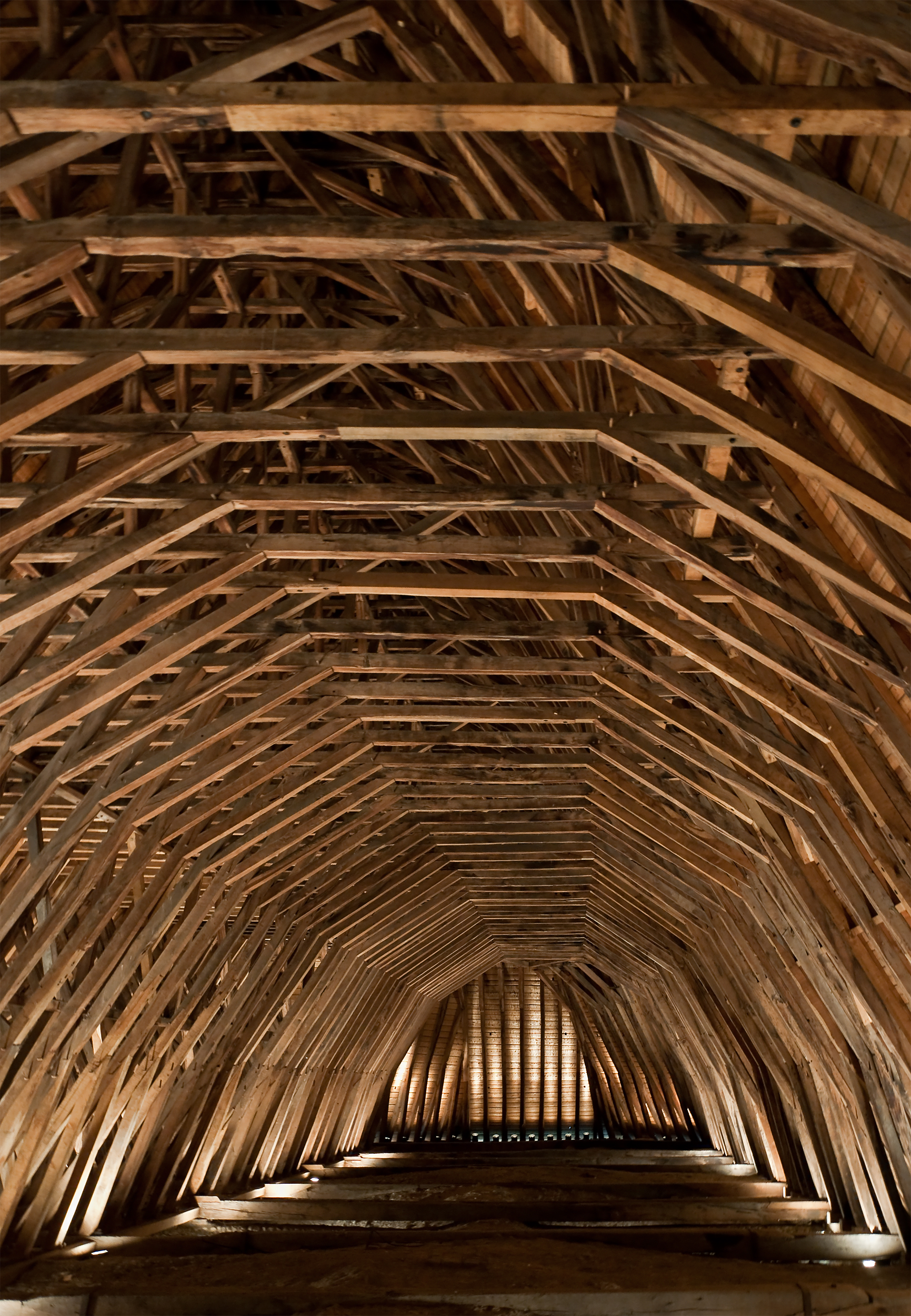
Heart of oak beams of the frame of Saint-Girons church, representing Middle-Age architecture.

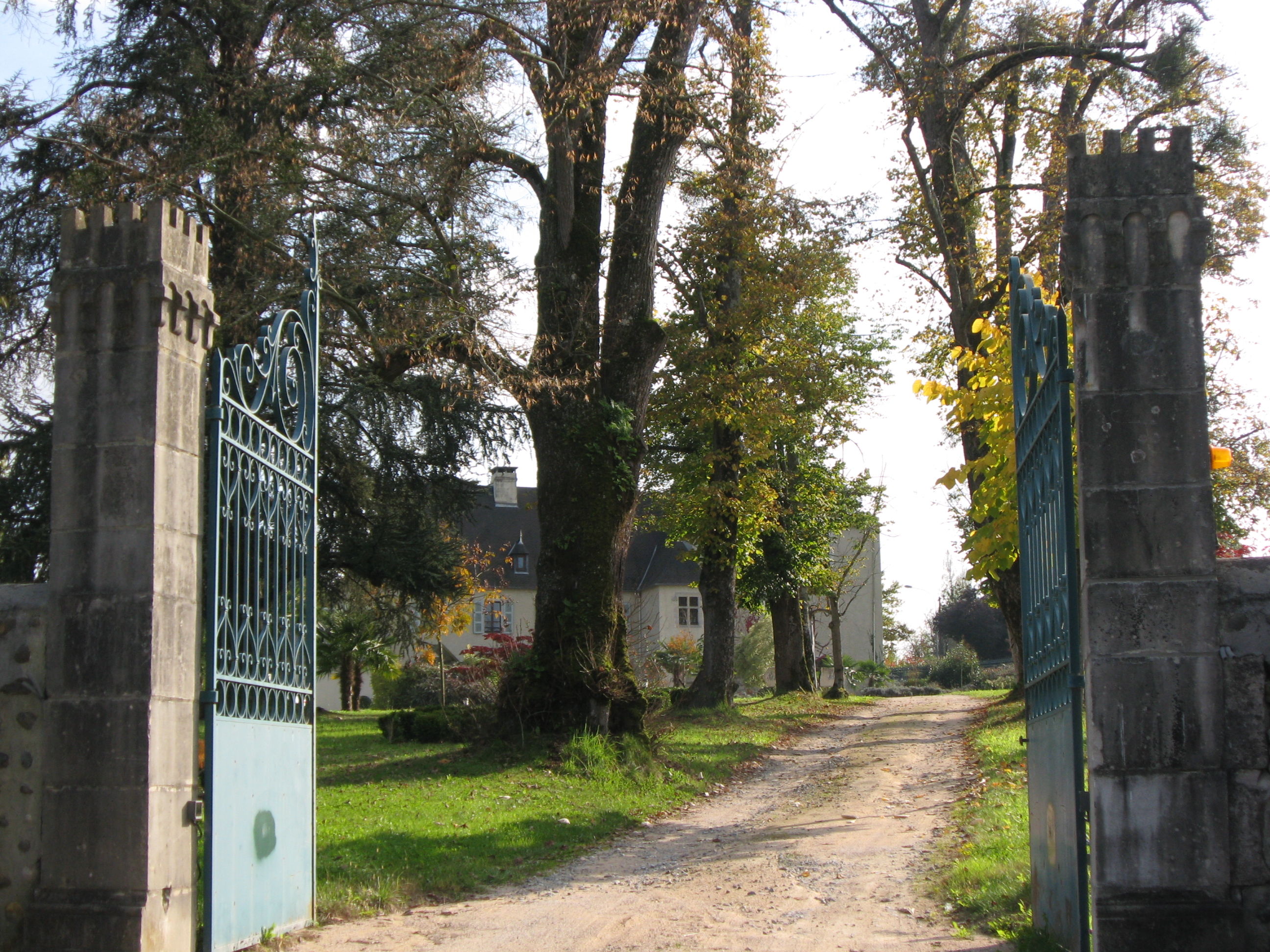
The entrance of le parc du château (the Park of Castle).

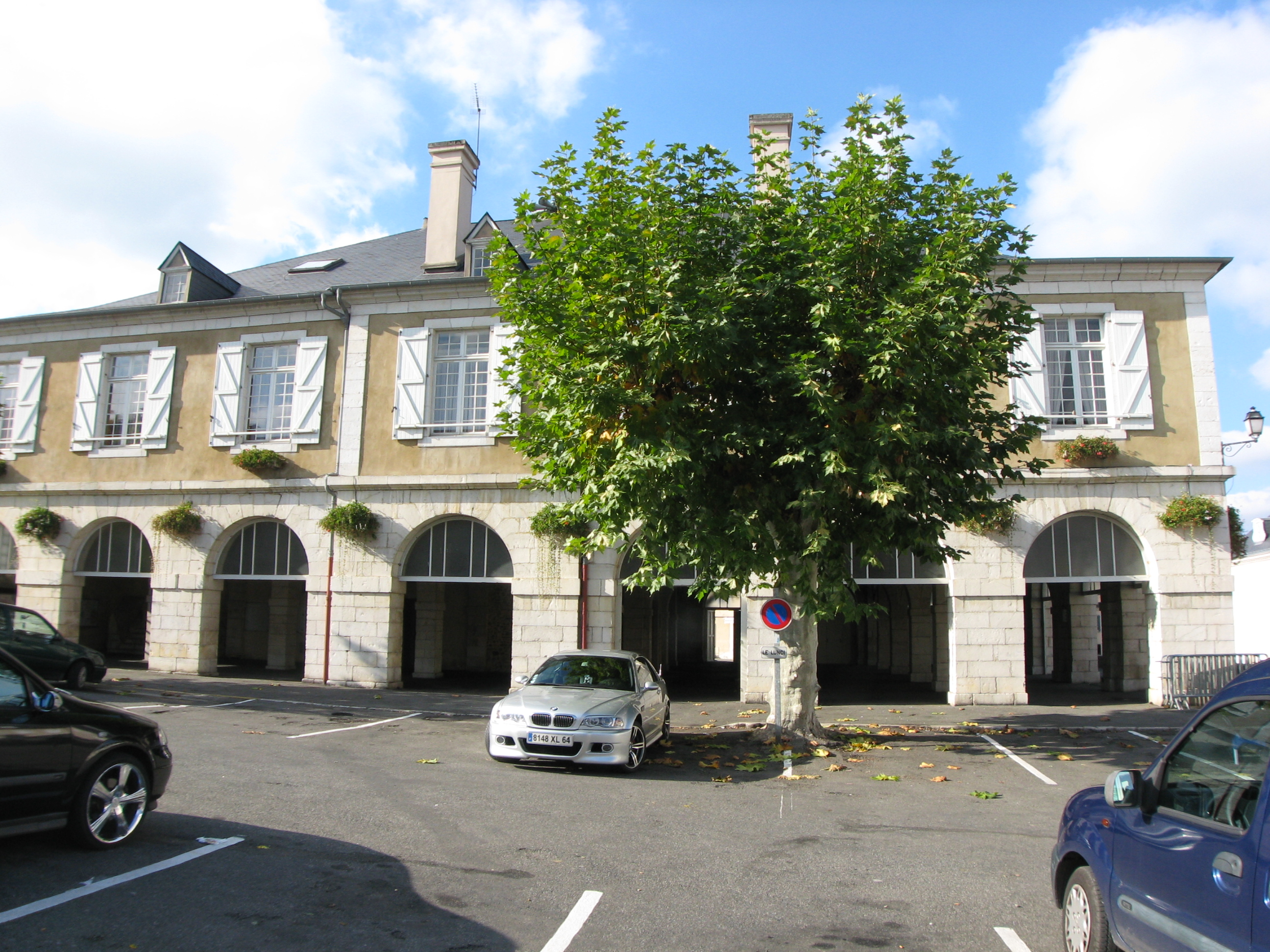
The halls.

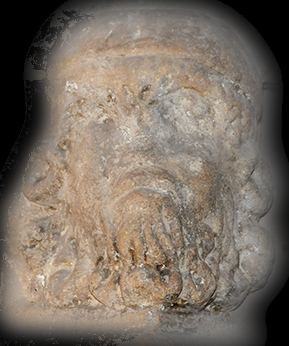
Sculpture of a "Cagot" in Saint-Girons church.

== See also ==
- Communes of the Pyrénées-Atlantiques department
