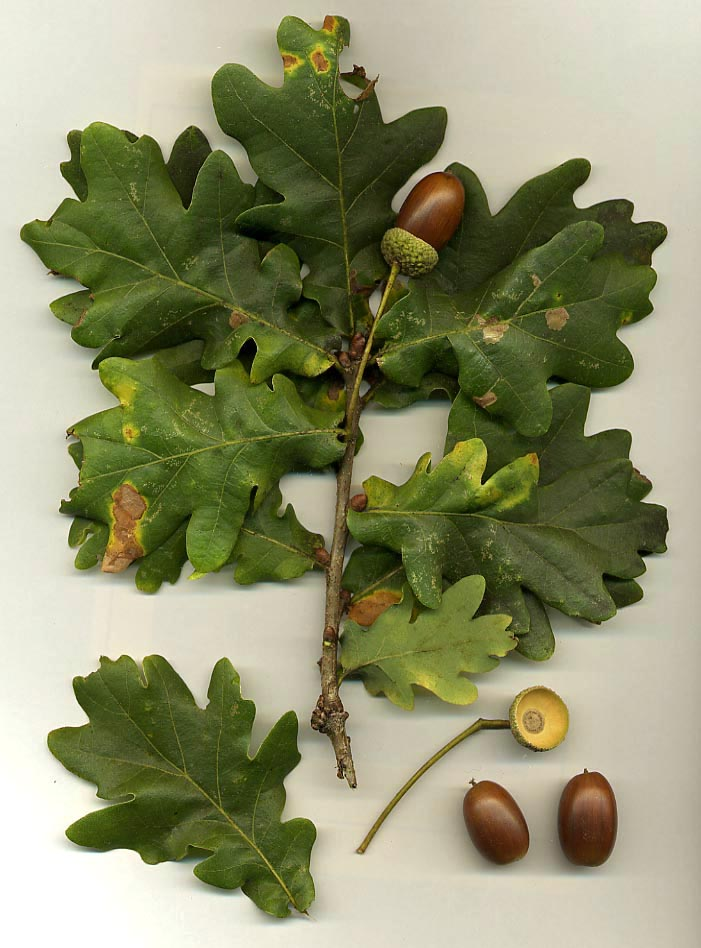
- Foliage and acorns of Quercus robur

Scientific classification
- Kingdom: Plantae
- Clade: Tracheophytes
- Clade: Angiosperms
- Clade: Eudicots
- Clade: Rosids
- Order: Fagales
- Family: Fagaceae
- Subfamily: Quercoideae
- Genus: Quercus; L.

Subgenera and sections
- Quercus subg. Cerris; Quercus sect. Cerris; Quercus sect. Cyclobalanopsis; Quercus sect. Ilex; Quercus subg. Quercus; Quercus sect. Lobatae; Quercus sect. Ponticae; Quercus sect. Protobalanus; Quercus sect. Quercus; Quercus sect. Virentes; See also List of Quercus species.

= Oak =

Oak Temporal range: Paleocene - Eocene boundary – recent 56–0 Ma possible Paleocene & Late Cretaceous records

Tree or shrub in the genus Quercus

An oak is a hardwood tree or shrub in the genus Quercus of the beech family. They have spirally arranged leaves, often with lobed edges, and a nut called an acorn, borne within a cup. The genus is widely distributed in the Northern Hemisphere, with some 475 species, both deciduous and evergreen. Fossil oaks date back to the Middle Eocene. Molecular phylogeny shows that the genus is divided into Old World and New World clades, but many oak species hybridise freely, making the genus's history difficult to resolve.

Ecologically, oaks are keystone species in habitats from Mediterranean semi-desert to subtropical rainforest. They live in association with many kinds of fungi, including truffles. Oaks support more than 950 species of caterpillar, many kinds of gall wasp which form distinctive galls (roundish woody lumps such as the oak apple), and a large number of pests and diseases. Oak leaves and acorns contain enough tannin to be toxic to cattle, but pigs are able to digest them safely. Oak timber is strong and hard, and has found many uses in construction and furniture-making. The bark was traditionally used for tanning leather. Wine barrels are made of oak; these are used for aging alcoholic beverages such as sherry and whisky, giving them a range of flavours, colours, and aromas. The spongy bark of the cork oak is used to make traditional wine bottle corks. Almost a third of oak species are threatened with extinction due to climate change, invasive pests, and habitat loss.

In culture, the oak tree is a symbol of strength and serves as the national tree of many countries. In Indo-European and related religions, the oak is associated with thunder gods. Individual oak trees of cultural significance include the Royal Oak in Britain, the Charter Oak in the United States, and the Guernica Oak in the Basque Country.

== Etymology ==
The generic name Quercus is Latin for "oak", derived from Proto-Indo-European *kwerkwu-, "oak", which is also the origin of the name "fir", another important or sacred tree in Indo-European culture. The word "cork", for the bark of the cork oak, similarly derives from Quercus. The common name "oak" is from Old English ac (seen in placenames such as Acton, from ac + tun, "oak town/village"), which in turn is from Proto-Germanic *aiks, "oak".

== Description ==
Oaks are hardwood (dicotyledonous) trees, deciduous or evergreen, with spirally arranged leaves, often with lobate margins; some have serrated leaves or entire leaves with smooth margins. Many deciduous species are marcescent, not dropping dead leaves until spring. Oaks can be grouped into "red oaks" that have soft bristles on their leaves' lobes, and "white oaks" that don't have those bristles.

In spring, a single oak tree produces both male and female flowers. The staminate (male) flowers are arranged in catkins, while the small pistillate (female) flowers produce an acorn (a kind of nut) contained in a capped peduncle called a cupule. Each acorn usually contains one seed. The acorns and leaves contain tannic acid, which helps to guard against fungi and insects. There are some 500 extant species of oaks.

Trees in the genus are usually large and slow-growing; Q. alba can reach an age of 600 years, a diameter of 4 metres (13 ft) and a height of 44 metres (144 ft). The Granit oak in Bulgaria, a Q. robur specimen, has an estimated age of 1,637 years, making it the oldest oak in Europe. The Wi'aaSal tree, a live oak in the reservation of the Pechanga Band of Indians, California, is at least 1,000 years old, and might be as much as 2,000 years old, which would make it the oldest oak in the US. Among the smallest oaks is Q. acuta, the Japanese evergreen oak. It forms a bush or small tree to a height of some 9 metres (30 ft).

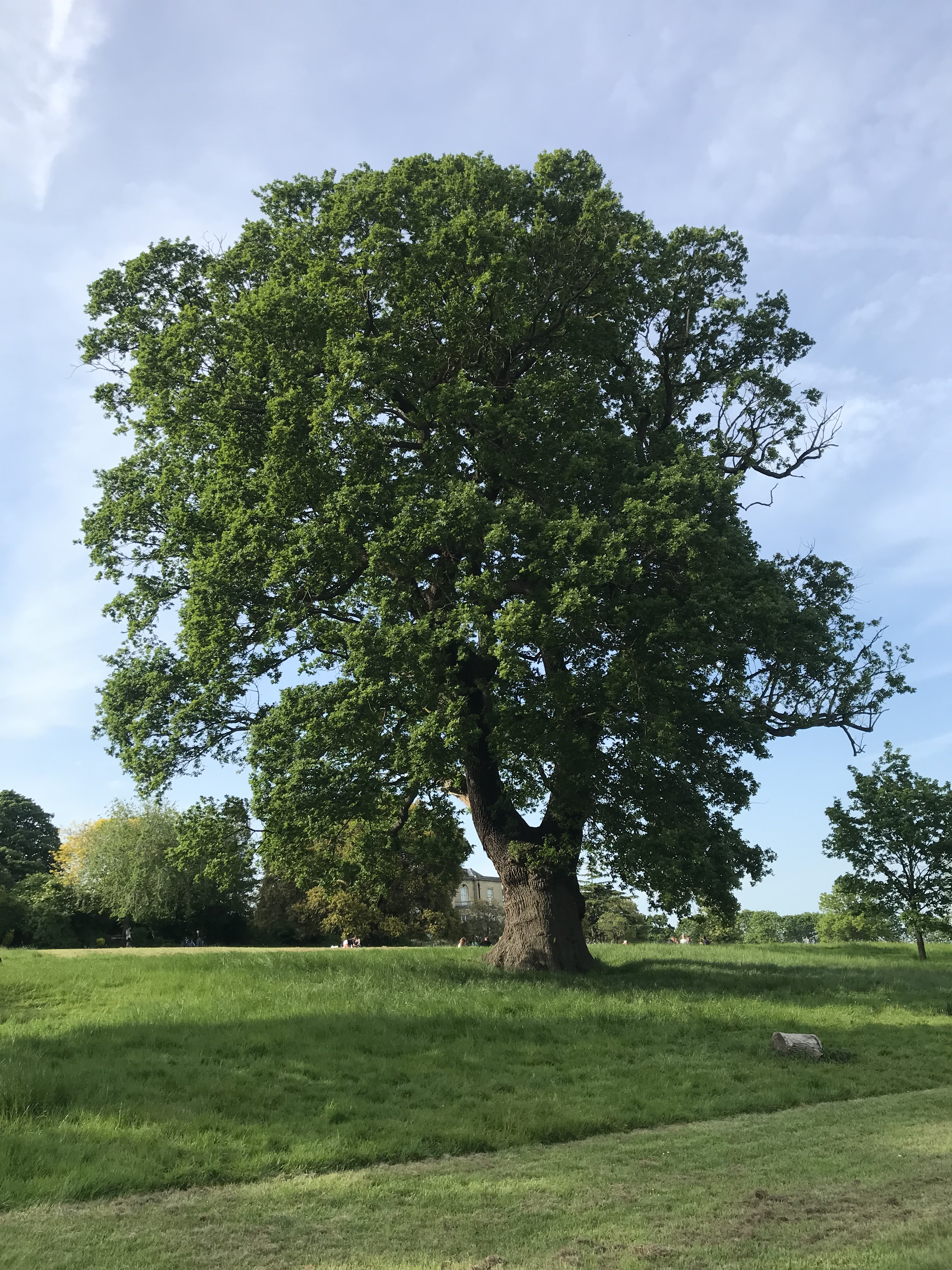
Quercus robur habit

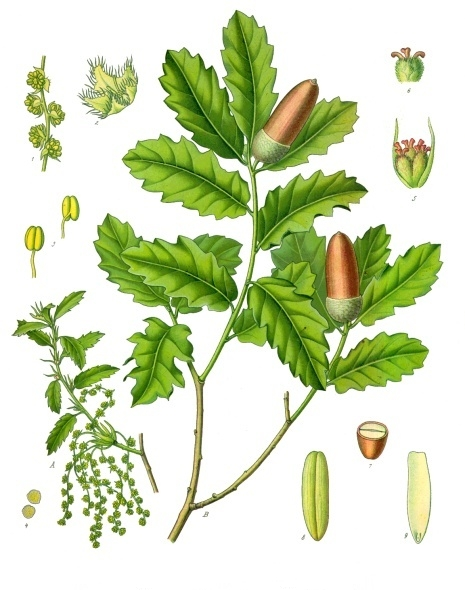
Illustration of Q. lusitanica showing staminate (left) and pistillate flowers (right)

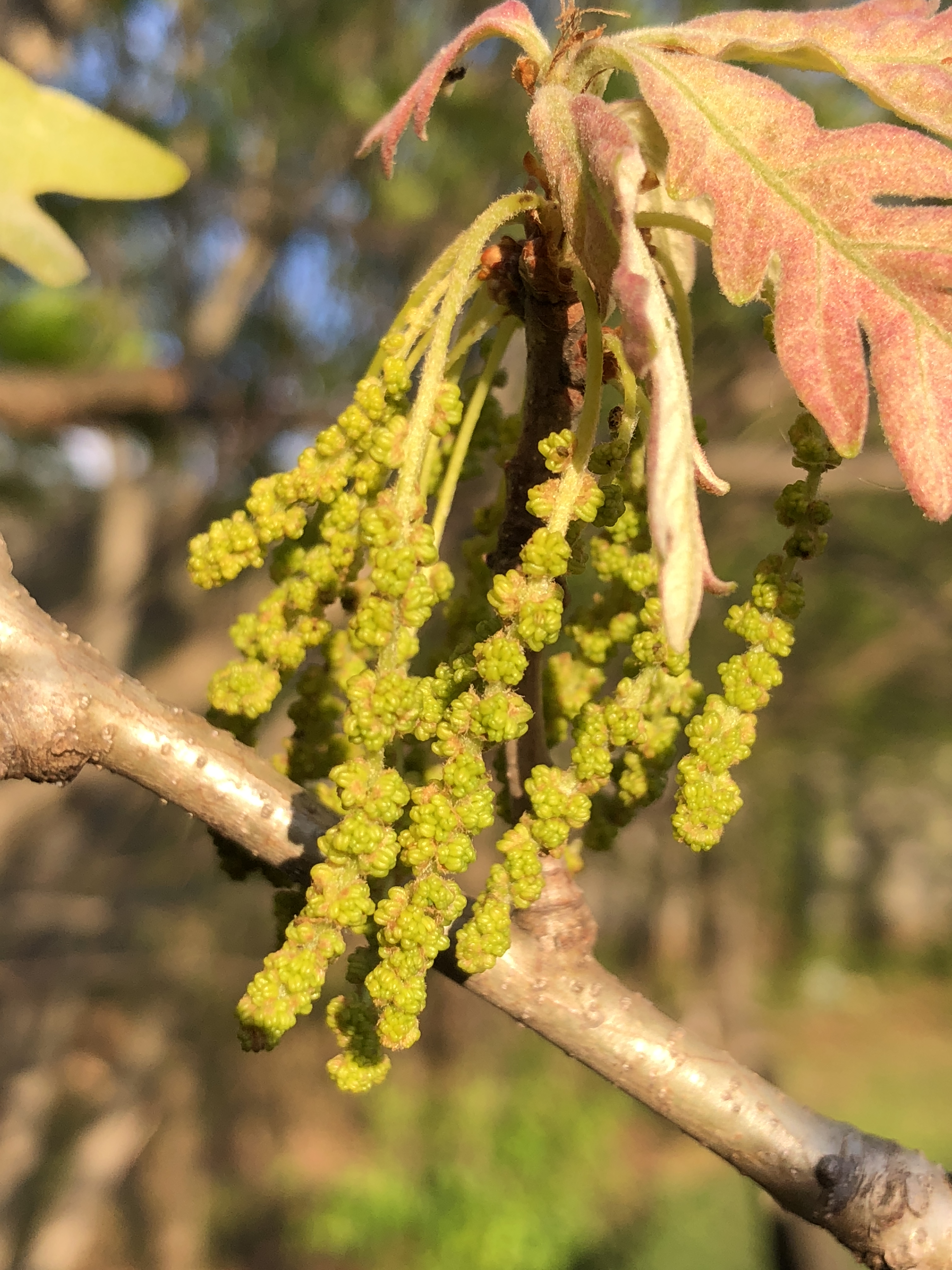
Catkins of Q. alba containing the staminate or 'male' flowers

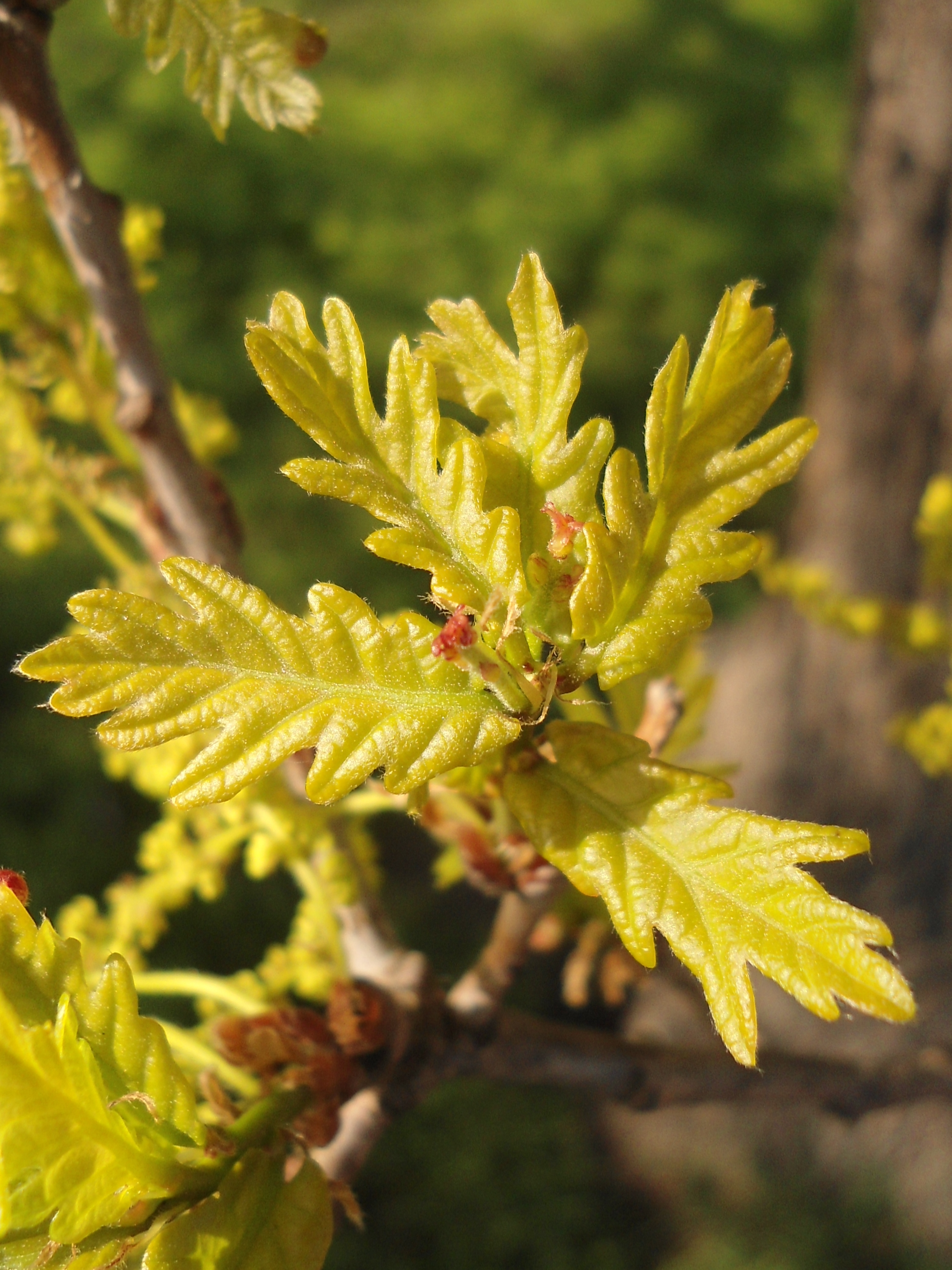
New leaves and reddish pistillate or 'female' flowers of Q. robur

== Evolution ==
=== Fossil history ===
Potential records of Quercus have been reported from Late Cretaceous deposits in North America and East Asia. These are not considered definitive, as macrofossils older than the Paleogene, and possibly from before the Eocene are mostly poorly preserved without critical features for certain identification. Amongst the oldest unequivocal records of Quercus are pollen from Austria, dating to the Paleocene-Eocene boundary, around 55 million years ago. The oldest records of Quercus in North America are from Oregon, dating to the Middle Eocene, around 44 million years ago, with the oldest records in Asia from the Middle Eocene of Japan; both forms have affinities to the Cyclobalanopsis group.

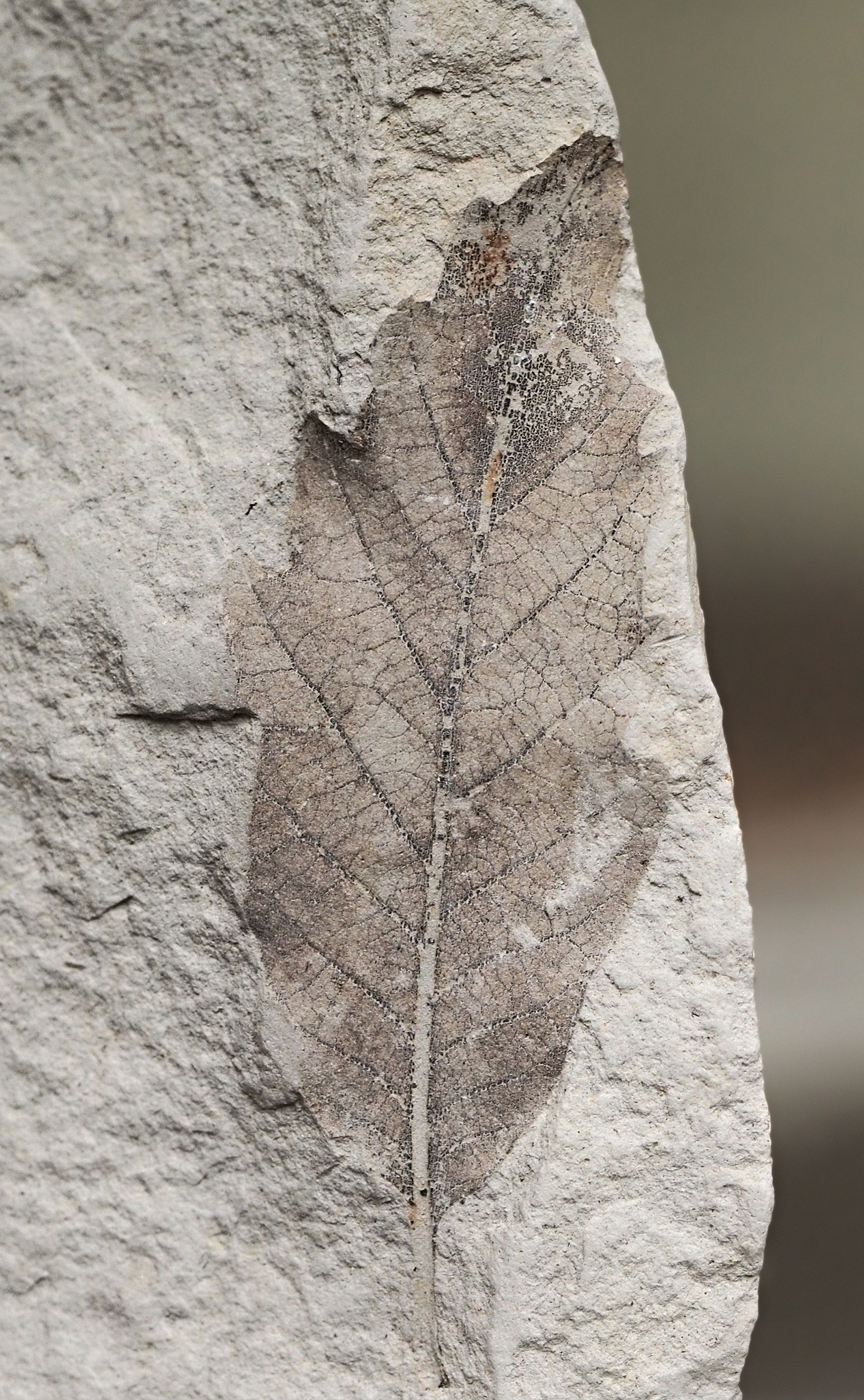
Quercus × hispanica leaf. Miocene, Lleida, Spain

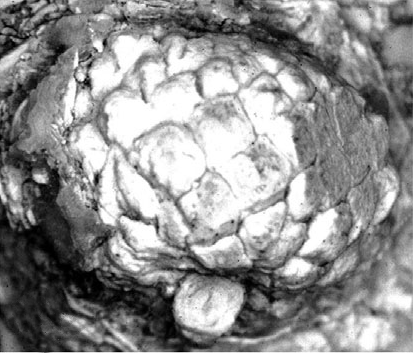
Quercus hiholensis acorn, Langhian age (Middle Miocene), Washington State, US (c. 15 mya)

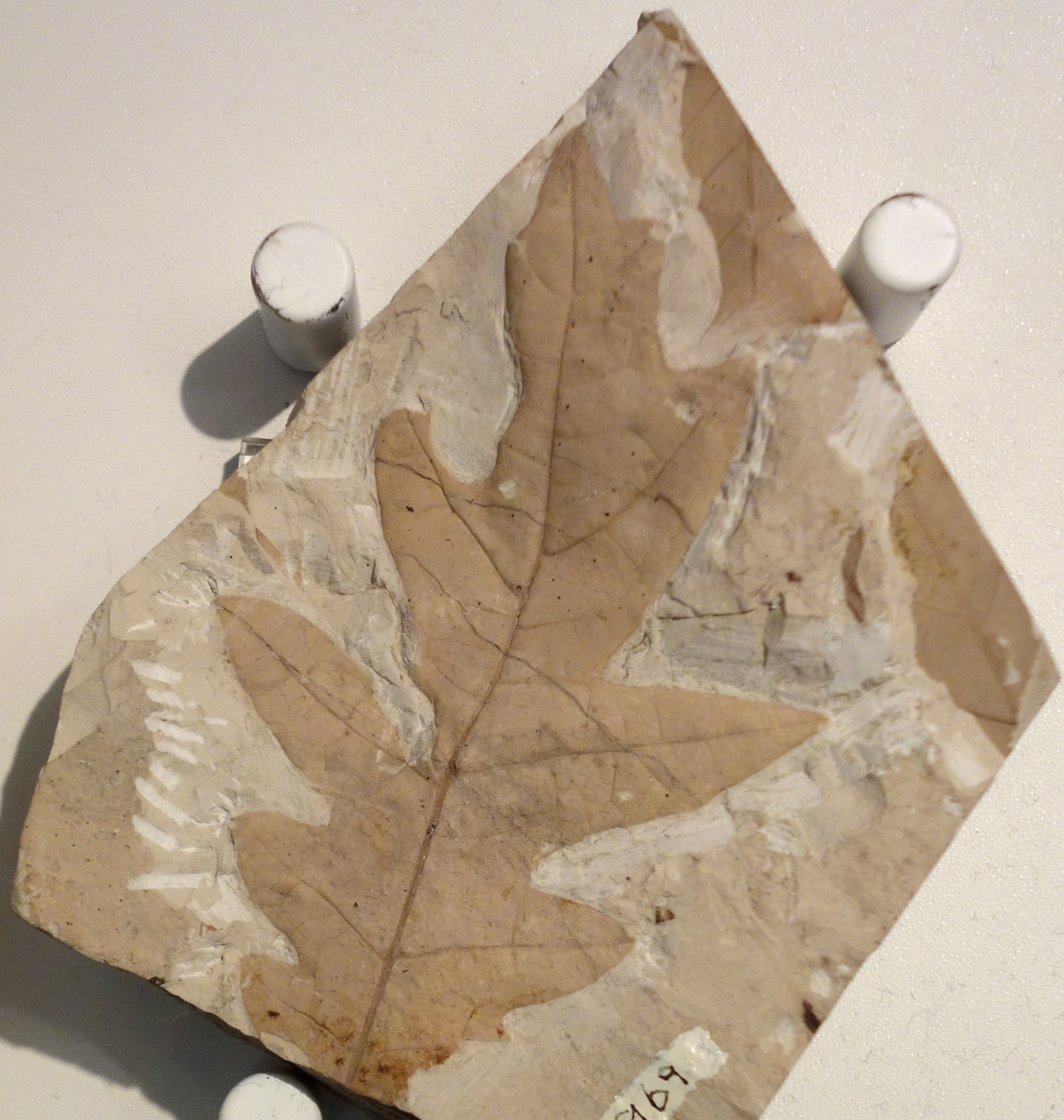
Quercus kobatakei leaf. Early Oligocene, Japan

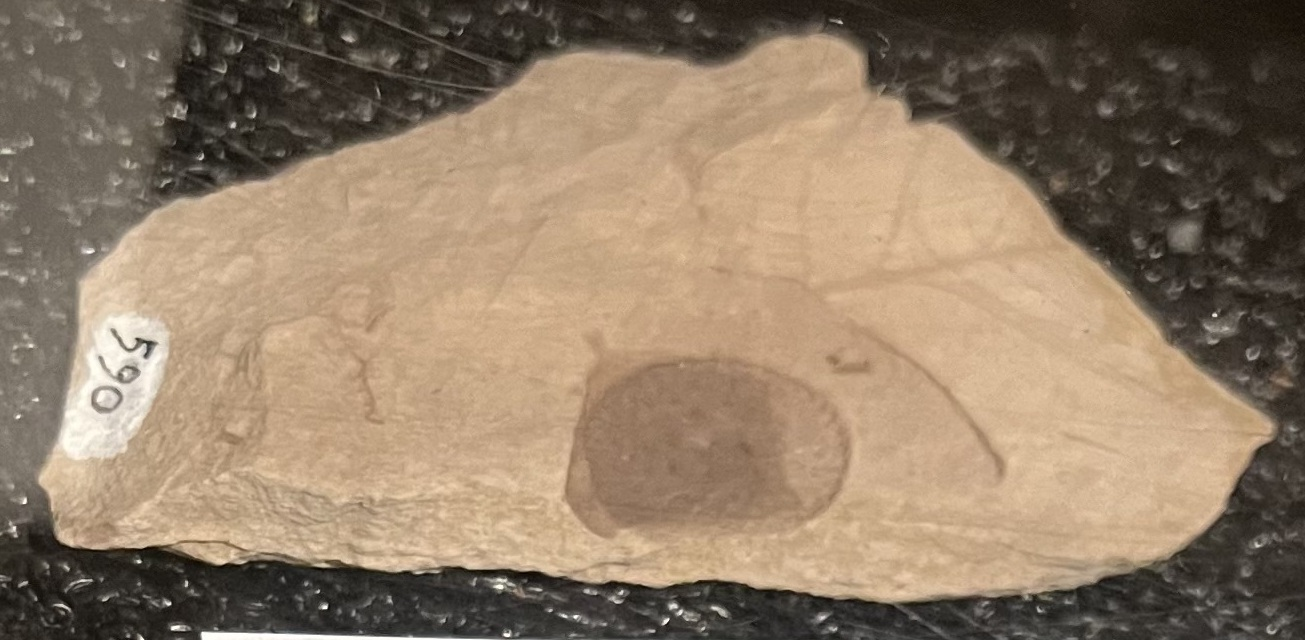
Early Oligocene acorn, Oregon, US (33 mya)

=== External phylogeny ===
Quercus forms part, or rather two parts, of the Quercoideae subfamily of the Fagaceae, the beech family. Modern molecular phylogenetics suggests the following relationships:

- Fagaceae
  - Fagoideae
    Fagus (beeches)
  - Quercoideae
    - Trigonobalanus (3 evergreen species)
    - - - Lithocarpus (stone oaks)
        - Chrysolepis (chinquapins)
      - - Quercus pro parte
        - - Notholithocarpus (tan oak)
          - - Quercus pro parte
            - - Castanopsis (also called chinquapins)
              - Castanea (chestnuts)

=== Internal phylogeny ===
Molecular techniques for phylogenetic analysis show that the genus Quercus consisted of Old World and New World clades. The entire genome of Quercus robur (the pedunculate oak) has been sequenced, revealing an array of mutations that may underlie the evolution of longevity and disease resistance in oaks. In addition, hundreds of oak species have been compared (at RAD-seq loci), allowing a detailed phylogeny to be constructed. However, the high signal of introgressive hybridization (the transfer of genetic material by repeated backcrossing with hybrid offspring) in the genus has made it difficult to resolve an unambiguous, unitary history of oaks. The phylogeny below is based on Hipp et al. (2019) and, for section Cerris, Denk et al. (2023):

- Quercus 56 mya
  - subgenus Cerris Old World
    - - section Cyclobalanopsis 44 mya
        - - CTB lineage
          - Cyclobalanoides
        - - Glauca
          - - Acuta
            - Semiserrata
    - - section Cerris
        - East Asian Cerris
          - Campylolepides
        - West Eurasian Cerris
          - Suber
          - - Aegilops
            - Core Cerris
              - Libani
              - Cerris
      - section Ilex
        - - Early-diverging Ilex
          - East Asian Ilex
        - - Himalaya-Mediterranean
          - Himalayan subalpine
  - subgenus Quercus New World
    - - section Lobatae
        - Agrifoliae
        - - Palustres
          - - - Coccineae (Rubrae)
              - Phellos (Laurifoliae)
            - - Texas red oaks
              - Erythromexicana
    - - - section Protobalanus
        - section Ponticae New World, W. Asia
      - - section Virentes
        - section Quercus New World, Eurasia, North Africa
          - - Dumosae
            - - - Prinoids
                - - Albae
                  - Roburoids
              - - Stellatae
                - - Texas white oaks
                  - Leucomexicana

=== Taxonomy ===
==== Taxonomic history ====
The genus Quercus was circumscribed by Carl Linnaeus in the first edition of his 1753 Species Plantarum. He described 15 species within the new genus, providing type specimens for 10 of these, and giving names but no types for Q. cerris, Q. coccifera, Q. ilex, Q. smilax, and Q. suber. He chose Q. robur, the pedunculate oak, as the type species for the genus.

A 2017 classification of Quercus, based on multiple molecular phylogenetic studies, divided the genus into two subgenera and eight sections:

- Subgenus Quercus – the New World clade (or high-latitude clade), mostly native to North America
  - Section Lobatae Loudon – North American red oaks
  - Section Protobalanus (Trelease) O.Schwarz – North American intermediate oaks
  - Section Ponticae Stef. – with a disjunct distribution between western Eurasia and western North America
  - Section Virentes Loudon – American southern live oaks
  - Section Quercus – white oaks from North America and Eurasia
- Subgenus Cerris Oerst. – the Old World clade (or mid-latitude clade), exclusively native to Eurasia
  - Section Cyclobalanopsis Oerst. – cycle-cup oaks of East Asia
  - Section Cerris Dumort. – cerris oaks of subtropical and temperate Eurasia and North Africa
  - Section Ilex Loudon – ilex oaks of tropical and subtropical Eurasia and North Africa

The subgenus division supports the evolutionary diversification of oaks among two distinct clades: the Old World clade (subgenus Cerris), including oaks that diversified in Eurasia; and the New World clade (subgenus Quercus), oaks that diversified mainly in the Americas.

==== Subgenus Quercus ====
- Sect. Lobatae (synonym Erythrobalanus), the red oaks of North America, Central America and northern South America. Styles are long; the acorns mature in 18 months and taste very bitter. The inside of the acorn shell appears woolly. The actual nut is encased in a thin, clinging, papery skin. The leaves typically have sharp lobe tips, with spiny bristles at the lobe.
- Sect. Protobalanus, the canyon live oak and its relatives, in the southwestern United States and northwest Mexico. Styles are short; the acorns mature in 18 months and taste very bitter. The inside of the acorn shell appears woolly. The leaves typically have sharp lobe tips, with bristles at the lobe tip.
- Sect. Ponticae, a disjunct including just two species. Styles are short, and the acorns mature in 12 months. The leaves have large stipules, high secondary veins, and are highly toothed.
- Sect. Virentes, the southern live oaks of the Americas. Styles are short, and the acorns mature in 12 months. The leaves are evergreen or subevergreen.
- Sect. Quercus (synonyms Lepidobalanus and Leucobalanus), the white oaks of Europe, Asia and North America. Trees or shrubs that produce nuts, specifically acorns, as fruits. Acorns mature in one year for annual trees and two years for biannual trees. Acorn is encapsulated by a spiny cupule as characterized by the family Fagaceae. Flowers in the Quercus genera produce one flower per node, with three or six styles, as well as three or six ovaries, respectively. The leaves mostly lack a bristle on their lobe tips, which are usually rounded. The type species is Quercus robur.

==== Subgenus Cerris ====
The type species is Quercus cerris.

- Sect. Cyclobalanopsis, the ring-cupped oaks of eastern and southeastern Asia. These are evergreen trees growing 10–40 metres (33–131 feet) tall. They are distinct from subgenus Quercus in that they have acorns with distinctive cups bearing concrescent rings of scales; they commonly also have densely clustered acorns, though this does not apply to all of the species. Species of Cyclobalanopsis are common in the evergreen subtropical laurel forests, which extend from southern Japan, southern Korea, and Taiwan across southern China and northern Indochina to the eastern Himalayas, in association with trees of the genus Castanopsis and the laurel family (Lauraceae).
- Sect. Cerris, the Turkey oak and its relatives of Europe and Asia. Styles are long; acorns mature in 18 months and taste very bitter. The inside of the acorn's shell is hairless. Its leaves typically have sharp lobe tips, with bristles at the lobe tip.
- Sect. Ilex, the Ilex oak and its relatives of Eurasia and northern Africa. Styles are medium-long; acorns mature in 12–24 months, appearing hairy on the inside. The leaves are evergreen, with bristle-like extensions on the teeth.

== Distribution ==
Global distribution of Quercus. The New and Old World parts are mostly separate clades. (Note: The New World sections are Protobalanus, Lobatae, Ponticae, Quercus, and Virentes. Old World sections are Cerris, Ilex and Cyclobalanopsis.) Red: North American. (Note: The North American sections are Protobalanus, Lobatae, Ponticae, Quercus, and Virentes.) Pink: Central American. (Note: The Central American sections are Virentes, Quercus and Lobatae) Yellow: European. (Note: The European sections are Quercus, Cerris and Ilex.) Green: West/Central Asian. (Note: The West/Central Asian sections are Ponticae, Quercus, Cerris and Ilex.) Turquoise: Southeast Asian. (Note: The Southeast Asian sections are Quercus, Cyclobalanopsis, Cerris and Ilex.) Blue: East Asian. (Note: The East Asian sections are Quercus, Cerris, Ilex and Cyclobalanopsis.) See the Phylogeny chapter/tree for sections.

The genus Quercus is native to the Northern Hemisphere and includes deciduous and evergreen species extending from cool temperate to tropical latitudes in the Americas, Asia, Europe, and North Africa. North America has the largest number of oak species, with approximately 160 species in Mexico, of which 109 are endemic, and about 90 in the United States. The second greatest area of oak diversity is China, with approximately 100 species.

In the Americas, Quercus is widespread from Vancouver and Nova Scotia in the south of Canada, south to Mexico and across the whole of the eastern United States. It is present in a small area of the west of Cuba; in Mesoamerica it occurs mainly above 1,000 metres (3,300 ft). The genus crossed the isthmus of Panama when the northern and southern continents came together and is present as one species, Q. humboldtii, above 1,000 metres in Colombia. The oaks of North America are of many sections (Protobalanus, Lobatae, Ponticae, Quercus, and Virentes) along with related genera such as Notholithocarpus.

In the Old World, oaks of section Quercus extend across the whole of Europe including European Russia apart from the far north, and north Africa (north of the Sahara) from Morocco to Libya. In Mediterranean Europe, they are joined by oaks of the sections Cerris and Ilex, which extend across Turkey, the Middle East, Iran, Afghanistan and Pakistan, while section Ponticae is endemic to the western Caucasus in Turkey and Georgia. Oaks of section Cyclobalanopsis extend in a narrow belt along the Himalayas to cover mainland and island Southeast Asia as far as Sumatra, Java, Borneo, and Palawan. Finally, oaks of multiple sections (Cyclobalanopsis, Ilex, Cerris, Quercus and related genera like Lithocarpus and Castanopsis) extend across east Asia including China, Korea, and Japan.

== Ecology ==
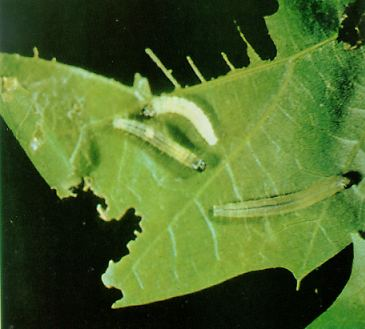
Caterpillars of the North American oak leafroller, Archips semiferanus, can defoliate oak forests.

Oaks are keystone species in a wide range of habitats from Mediterranean semi-desert to subtropical rainforest. They are important components of hardwood forests; some species grow in associations with members of the Ericaceae in oak–heath forests. Several kinds of truffles, including two well-known varieties – black Périgord truffle and the white Piedmont truffle – have symbiotic relationships with oak trees. Similarly, many other fungi, such as Ramaria flavosaponaria, associate with oaks.

Oaks support more than 950 species of caterpillars, an important food source for many birds. Mature oak trees shed widely varying numbers of acorns (known collectively as mast) annually, with large quantities in mast years. This may be a predator satiation strategy, increasing the chance that some acorns will survive to germination.

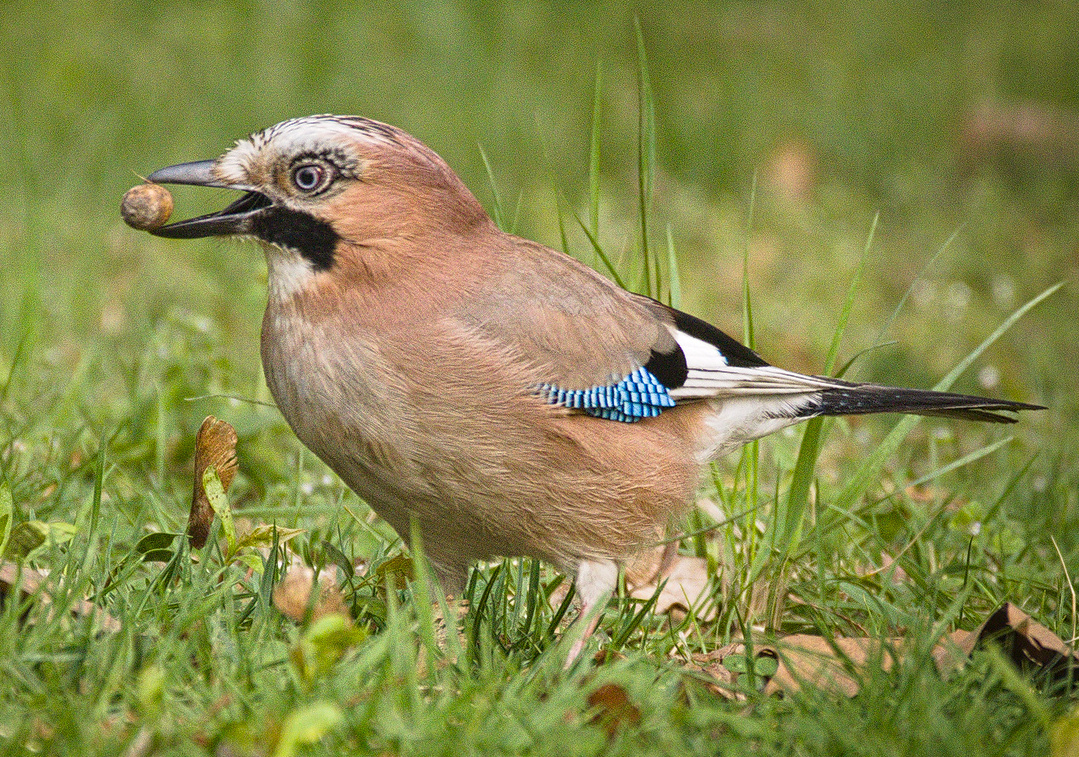
Jays feed on acorns and help to disperse these seeds.

Animals including squirrels and jays – Eurasian jays in the Old World, blue jays in North America – feed on acorns, and are important agents of seed dispersal as they carry the acorns away and bury many of them as food stores. However, some species of squirrel selectively excise the embryos from the acorns that they store, meaning that the food store lasts longer and that the acorns will never germinate.

=== Hybridisation ===
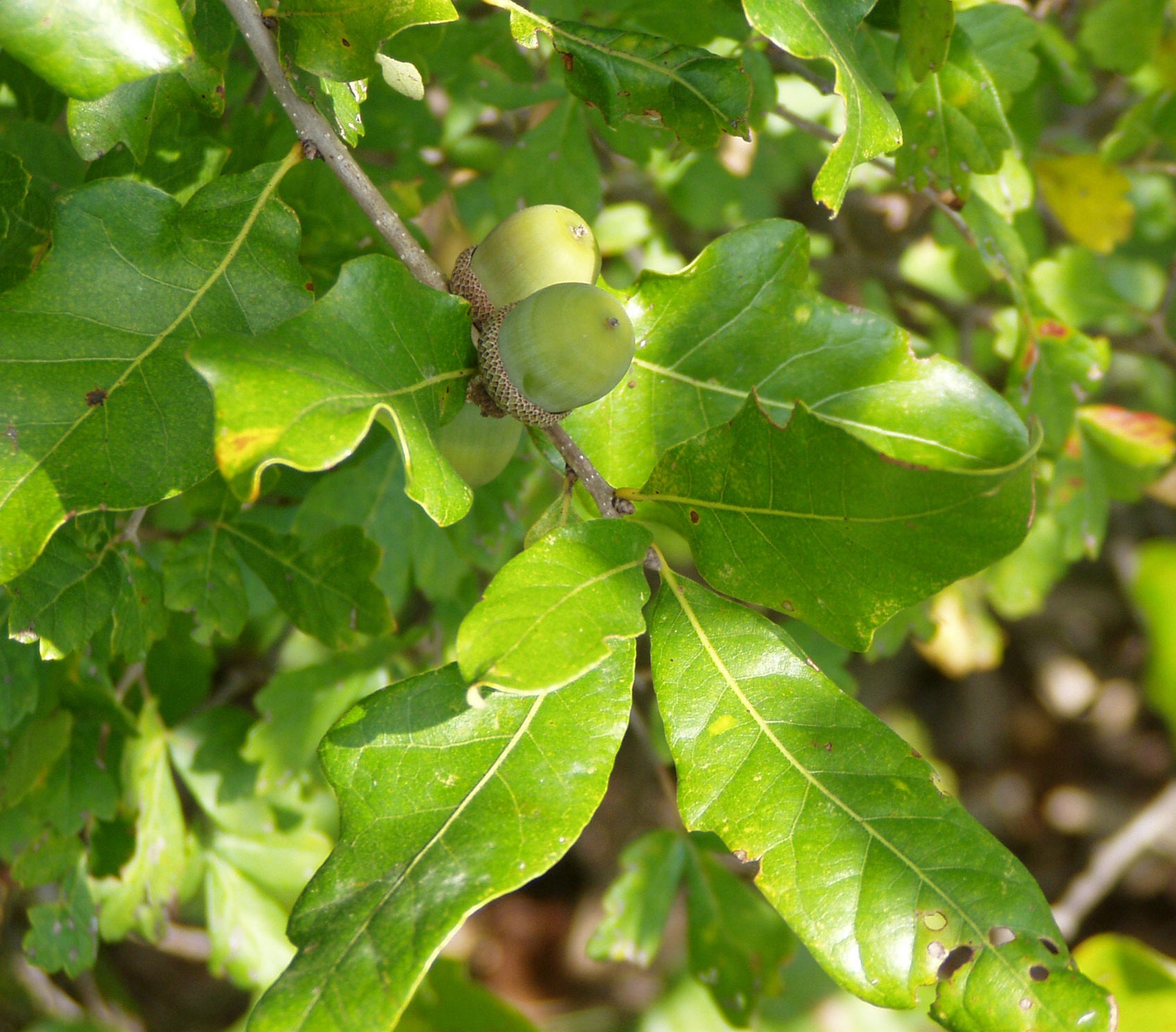
A hybrid white oak, possibly Quercus stellata × Q. muehlenbergii

Interspecific hybridization is quite common among oaks, but usually between species within the same section only, and most common in the white oak group. White oaks cannot discriminate against pollination by other species in the same section. Because they are wind pollinated and have weak internal barriers to hybridization, hybridization produces functional seeds and fertile hybrid offspring. Ecological stresses, especially near habitat margins, can also cause a breakdown of mate recognition as well as a reduction of male function (pollen quantity and quality) in one parent species.

Frequent hybridization among oaks has consequences for oak populations around the world; most notably, hybridization has produced large populations of hybrids with much introgression and the evolution of new species. Introgression has caused different species in the same populations to share up to 50% of their genetic information. As a result, genetic data often does not differentiate between clearly morphologically distinct species, but instead differentiates populations. The maintenance of particular loci for adaptation to ecological niches may explain the retention of species identity despite significant gene flow.

The Fagaceae, or beech family, to which the oaks belong, is a slowly-evolving clade compared to other angiosperms, and the patterns of hybridization and introgression in Quercus pose a significant challenge to the concept of a species as a group of "actually or potentially interbreeding populations which are reproductively isolated from other such groups." By this definition, many species of Quercus would be lumped together according to their geographic and ecological habitat, despite clear distinctions in morphology and genetic data.

=== Diseases and pests ===
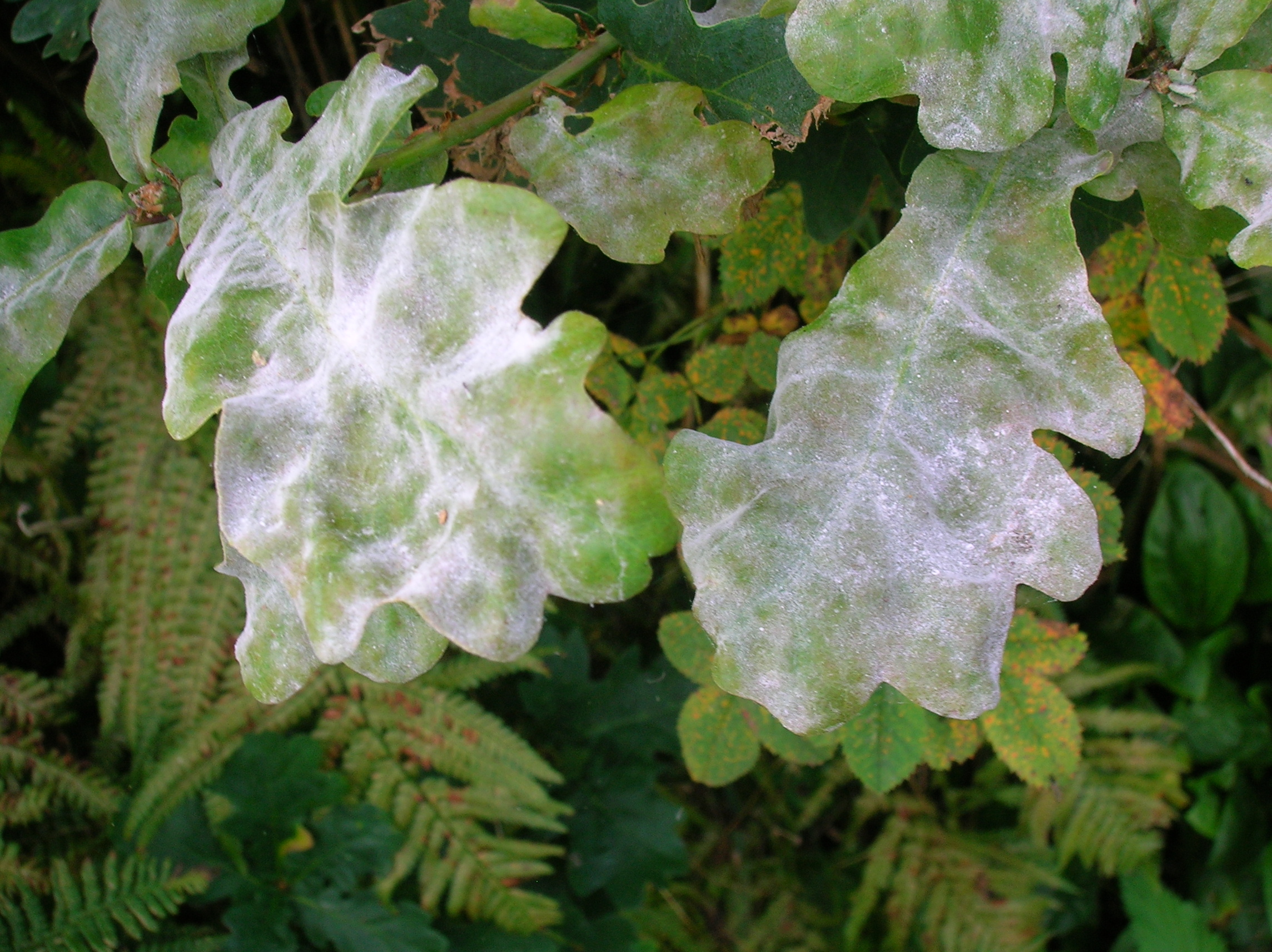
Oak powdery mildew on pedunculate oak, caused by Erysiphe alphitoides

Oaks are affected by a large number of pests and diseases. For instance, Q. robur and Q. petraea in Britain host 423 insect species. This diversity includes 106 macro-moths, 83 micro-moths, 67 beetles, 53 cynipoidean wasps, 38 heteropteran bugs, 21 auchenorrhynchan bugs, 17 sawflies, and 15 aphids. The insect numbers are seasonal: in spring, chewing insects such as caterpillars become numerous, followed by insects with sucking mouthparts such as aphids, then by leaf miners, and finally by gall wasps such as Neuroterus. Several powdery mildews affect oak species. In Europe, the species Erysiphe alphitoides is the most common. It reduces the ability of leaves to photosynthesize, and infected leaves are shed early. Another significant threat, the oak processionary moth (Thaumetopoea processionea), has emerged in the UK since 2006. The caterpillars of this species defoliate the trees and are hazardous to human health; their bodies are covered with poisonous hairs which can cause rashes and respiratory problems. A little-understood disease of mature oaks, acute oak decline, has affected the UK since 2009. In California, goldspotted oak borer (Agrilus auroguttatus) has destroyed many oak trees, while sudden oak death, caused by the oomycete pathogen Phytophthora ramorum, has devastated oaks in California and Oregon, and is present in Europe. Japanese oak wilt, caused by the fungus Raffaelea quercivora, has rapidly killed trees across Japan.

=== Gall communities ===
Many galls are found on oak leaves, buds, flowers, and roots. Examples are oak artichoke gall, oak marble gall, oak apple gall, knopper gall, and spangle gall. These galls are the handiwork of tiny wasps from the Cynipidae. In a complex ecological relationship, these gall wasps become hosts to parasitoid wasps—primarily from the order Chalcidoidea—which lay their larvae inside the gall wasps, ultimately leading to the hosts' demise. Additionally, inquilines live commensally within the galls without harming the gall wasps.

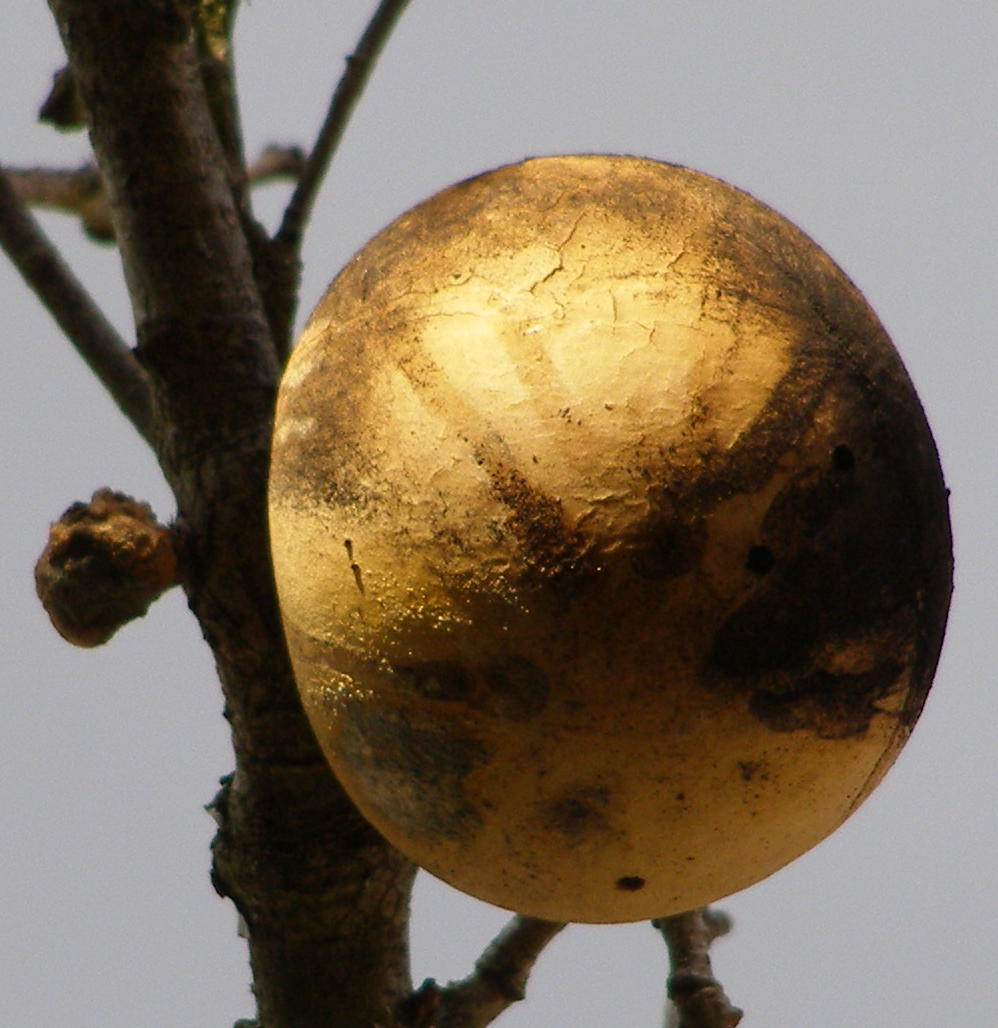
Oak apple gall on Quercus garryana

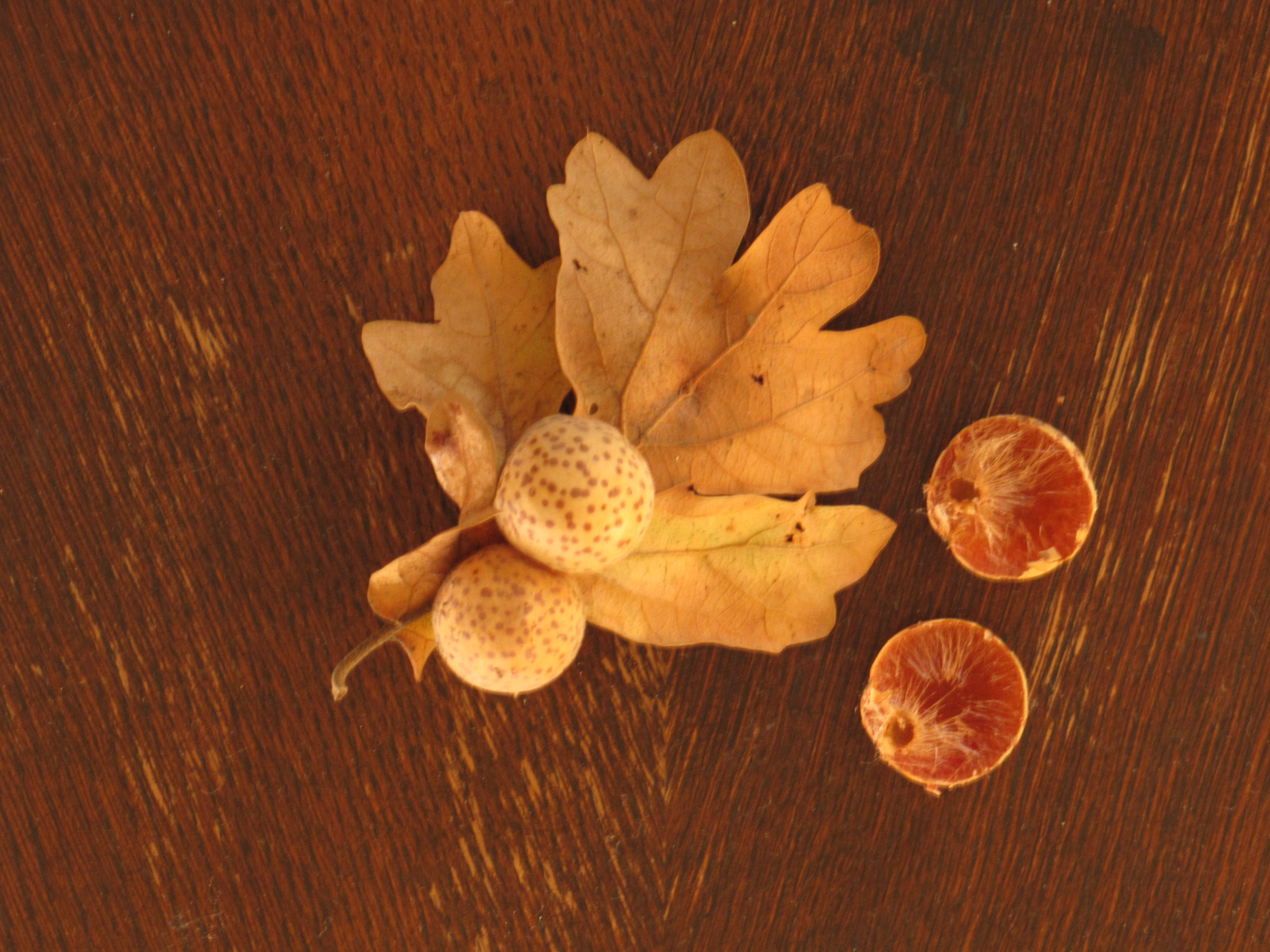
Oak apples on oak leaf

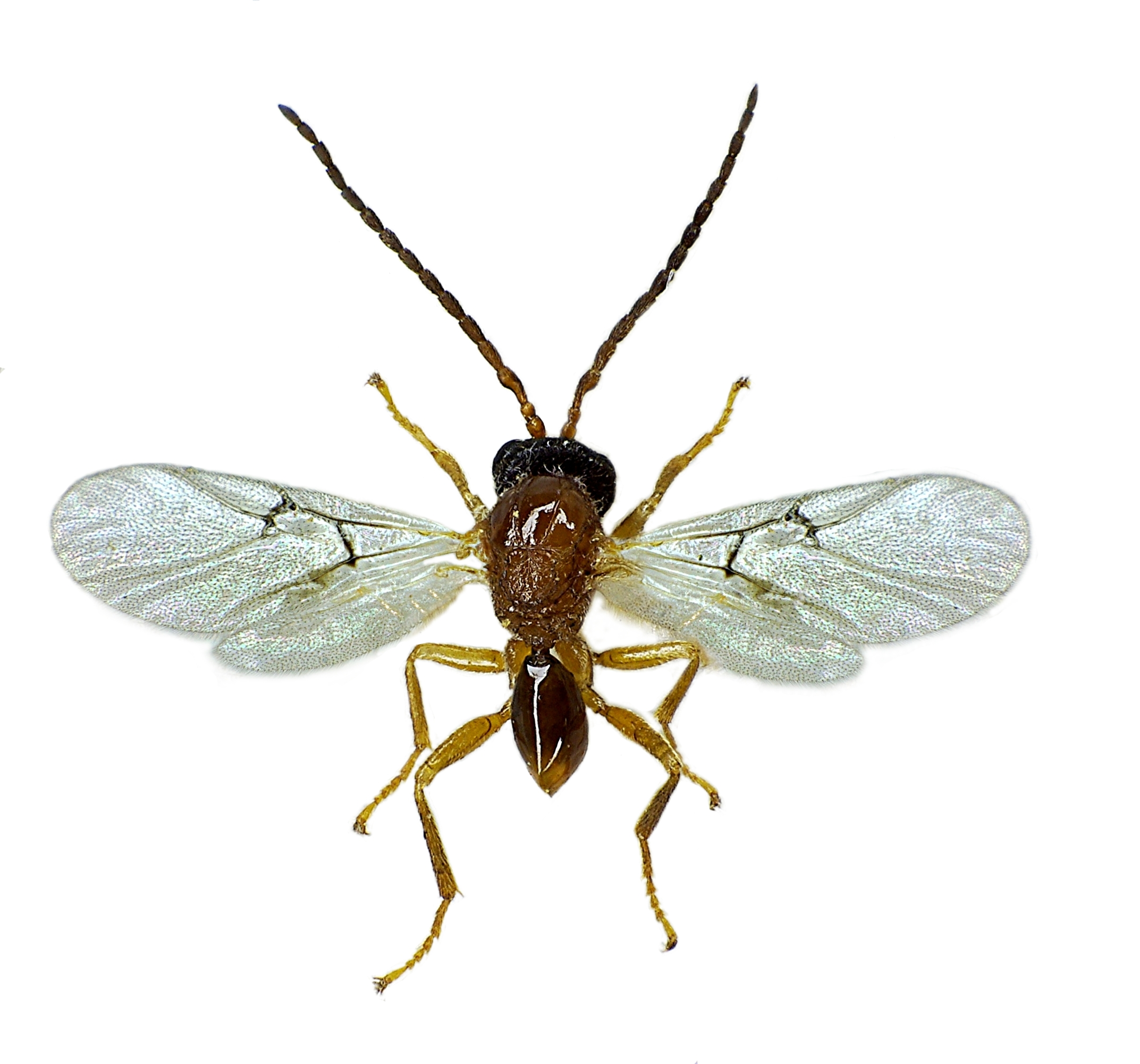
Biorhiza pallida male, the cause of oak apple galls

== Conservation ==
An estimated 31% of the world's oak species are threatened with extinction, while 41% of oak species are considered to be of conservation concern. The countries with the highest numbers of threatened oak species (as of 2020) are China with 36 species, Mexico with 32 species, Vietnam with 20 species, and the US with 16 species. Leading causes are climate change and invasive pests in the US, and deforestation and urbanization in Asia. In the Himalayan region of India, oak forests are being invaded by pine trees due to global warming. The associated pine forest species may cross frontiers and integrate into the oak forests. Over the past 200 years, large areas of oak forest in the highlands of Mexico, Central America, and the northern Andes have been cleared for coffee plantations and cattle ranching. There is a continuing threat to these forests from exploitation for timber, fuelwood, and charcoal. In the US, entire oak ecosystems have declined due to a combination of factors thought to include fire suppression, increased consumption of acorns by growing mammal populations, herbivory of seedlings, and introduced pests. However, disturbance-tolerant oaks may have benefited from grazers like bison, and suffered when the bison were removed following European colonization.

== Toxicity ==
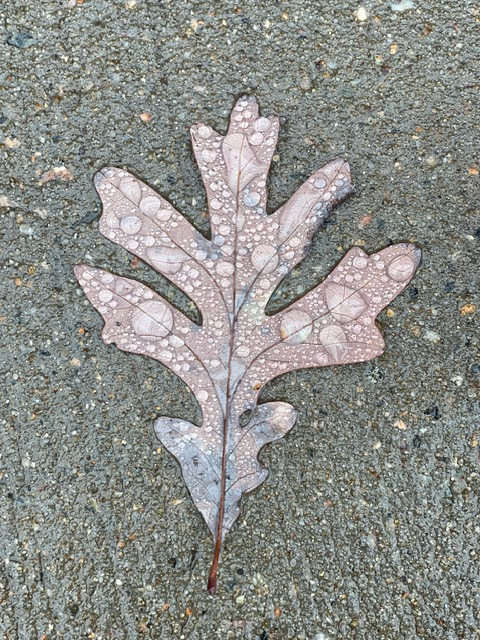
Photograph of single white oak leaf with condensation

The leaves and acorns of oaks are poisonous to livestock, including cattle and horses, if eaten in large amounts, due to the toxin tannic acid, which causes kidney damage and gastroenteritis. An exception is the domestic pig, which, under the right conditions, may be fed entirely on acorns, and has traditionally been pastured in oak woodlands (such as the Spanish dehesa and the English system of pannage). Humans can eat acorns after leaching out the tannins in water.

== Uses ==
=== Timber ===
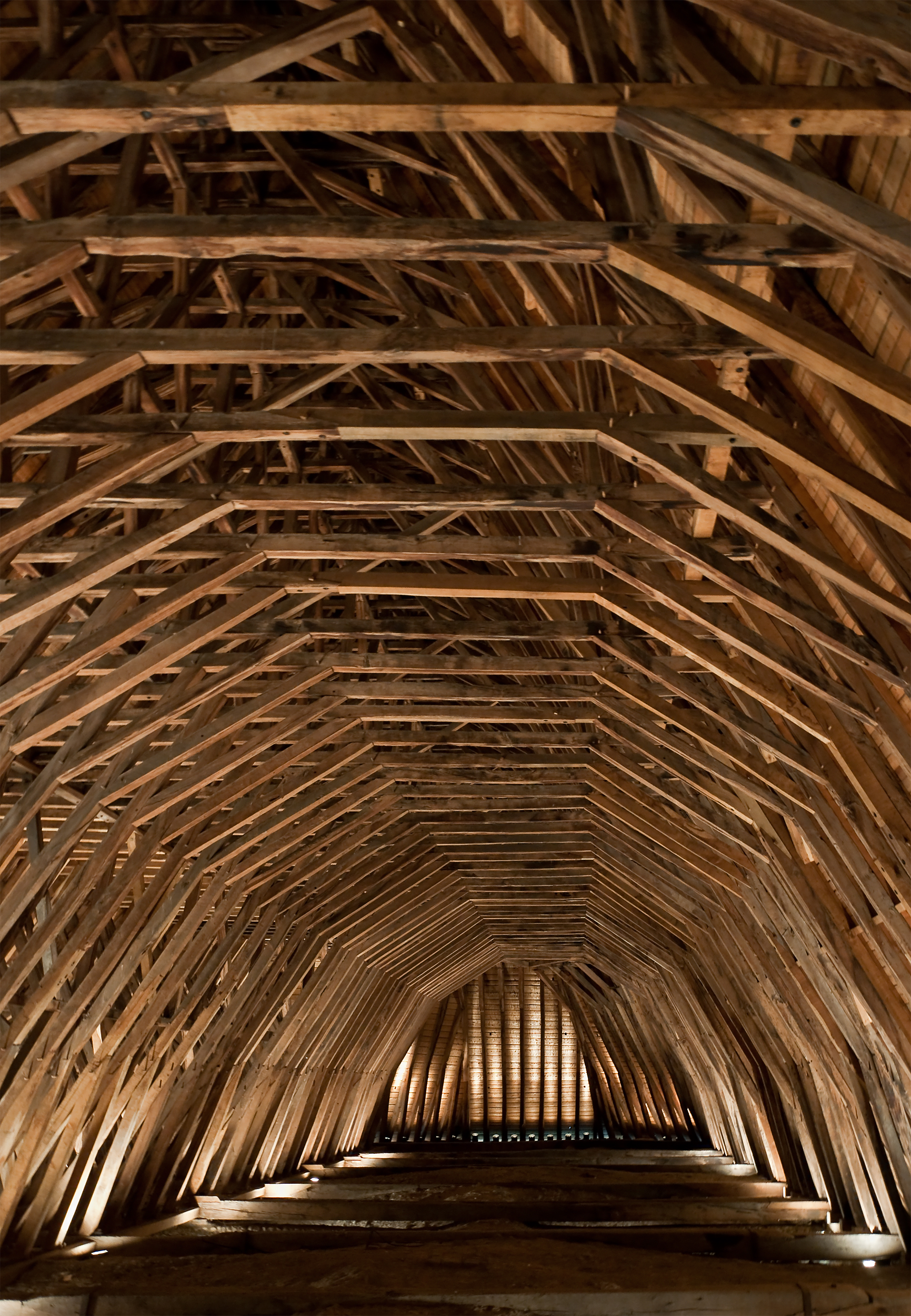
Heart of oak beams of the frame of the Église Saint-Girons in Monein, France

Oak timber is a strong and hard wood with many uses, such as for furniture, floors, building frames, and veneers. The wood of Quercus cerris (the Turkey oak) has better mechanical properties than those of the white oaks Q. petraea and Q. robur; the heartwood and sapwood have similar mechanical properties. Of the North American red oaks, the northern red oak, Quercus rubra, is highly prized for lumber. The wood is resistant to insect and fungal attack. Wood from Q. robur and Q. petraea was used in Europe for shipbuilding, especially of naval men of war, until the 19th century.

=== Other traditional products ===
Oak bark, with its high tannin content, was traditionally used in the Old World for tanning leather. The best bark material came from trees aged twenty years of age that grew from coppicing older trees, bark from old trees that fell naturally have less quality. Oak galls were used for centuries as a main ingredient in iron gall ink for manuscripts, harvested at a specific time of year. In Korea, sawtooth oak bark is used to make shingles for traditional roof construction. The dried bark of the white oak was used in traditional medical preparations; its tannic acid content made it astringent and antiseptic.

=== Culinary ===
Acorns of various oak species have been used as food for millennia, in Asia, Europe, the Middle East, North Africa, and among the native peoples of North America. Given their high tannin content, acorns have often been leached to remove tannins before processing. Acorns have been ground to make a flour, and roasted as imitation coffee. In Korea, acorn starch is made into jelly called dotori-muk.

Barrels for aging wines, sherry, and spirits such as brandy and Scotch whisky are made from oak, with single barrel malt whiskies fetching a premium. The use of oak in wine adds a range of flavours. Oak barrels, which may be charred before use, contribute to their contents' colour, taste, and aroma, imparting a desirable oaky vanillin flavour. A dilemma for wine producers is to choose between French and American oakwoods. French oaks (Quercus robur, Q. petraea) give greater refinement and are chosen for the best, most expensive wines. American oak contributes greater texture and resistance to ageing, but produces a more powerful bouquet.

Oak wood chips are used for smoking foods such as fish, meat, and cheese. In Japan, Children's Day is celebrated with Kashiwa-mochi rice cakes, filled with a sweet red bean paste, and wrapped in a kashiwa oak leaf. The bark of the cork oak is used to produce cork stoppers for wine bottles. This species grows around the Mediterranean Sea; Portugal, Spain, Algeria, and Morocco produce most of the world's supply.

In North Africa, acorns have been pressed to make acorn oil: the oil content can be as high as 30%. Oaks have also been used as fodder, both leaves and acorns being fed to livestock such as pigs.

In Mexico, acorns have traditionally been used by indigenous peoples to prepare atole, a thick beverage, as well as stews. On the Iberian Peninsula, acorns remained a food source until the 1960s, particularly during periods of scarcity, with the sweet acorns of the holm oak (Quercus ilex) being preferred. In contemporary Spanish cuisine, chefs have incorporated acorn flour into desserts and other dishes.

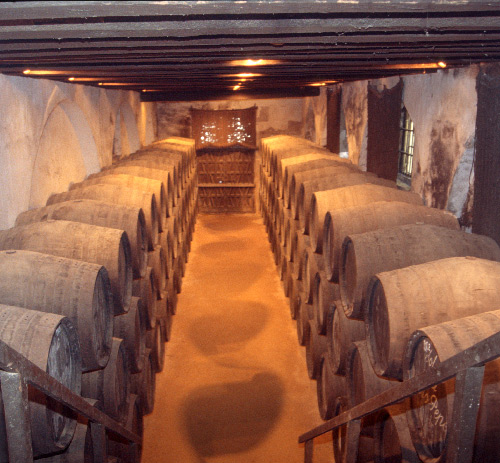
Sherry maturing in oak barrels

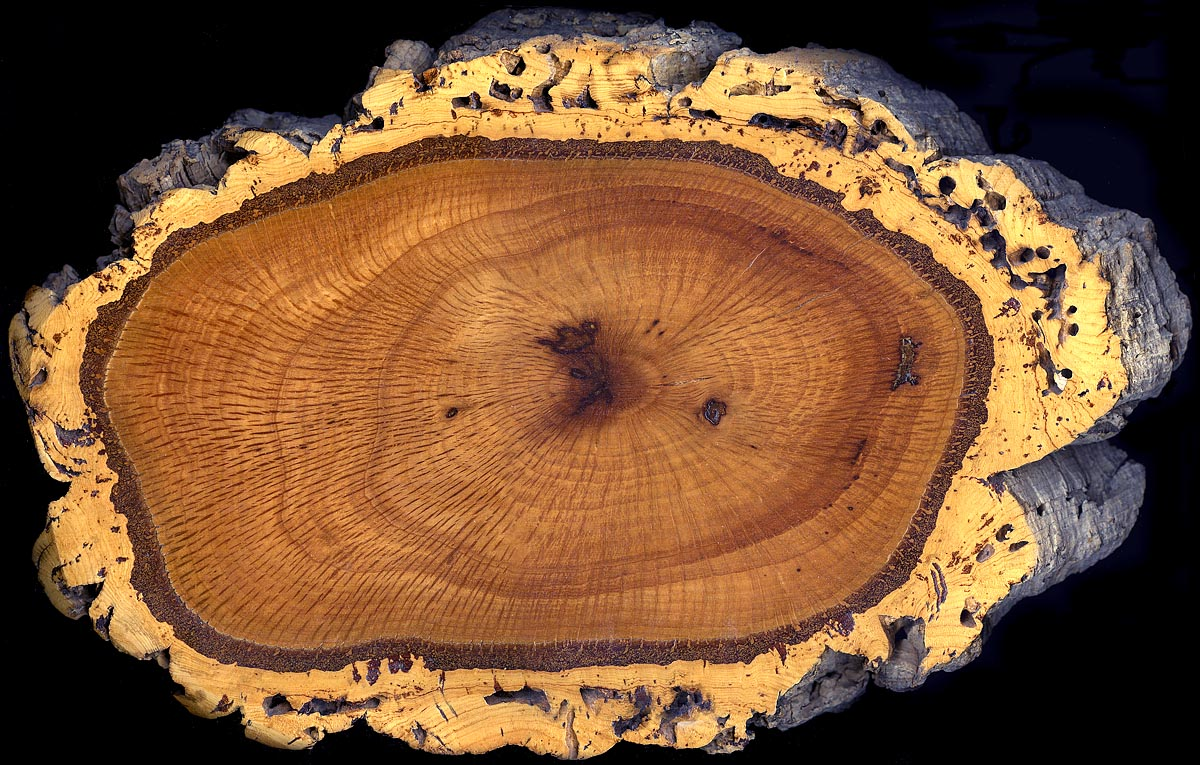
A cross section of the trunk of a cork oak, Quercus suber, showing the thick spongy bark used for making wine bottle corks

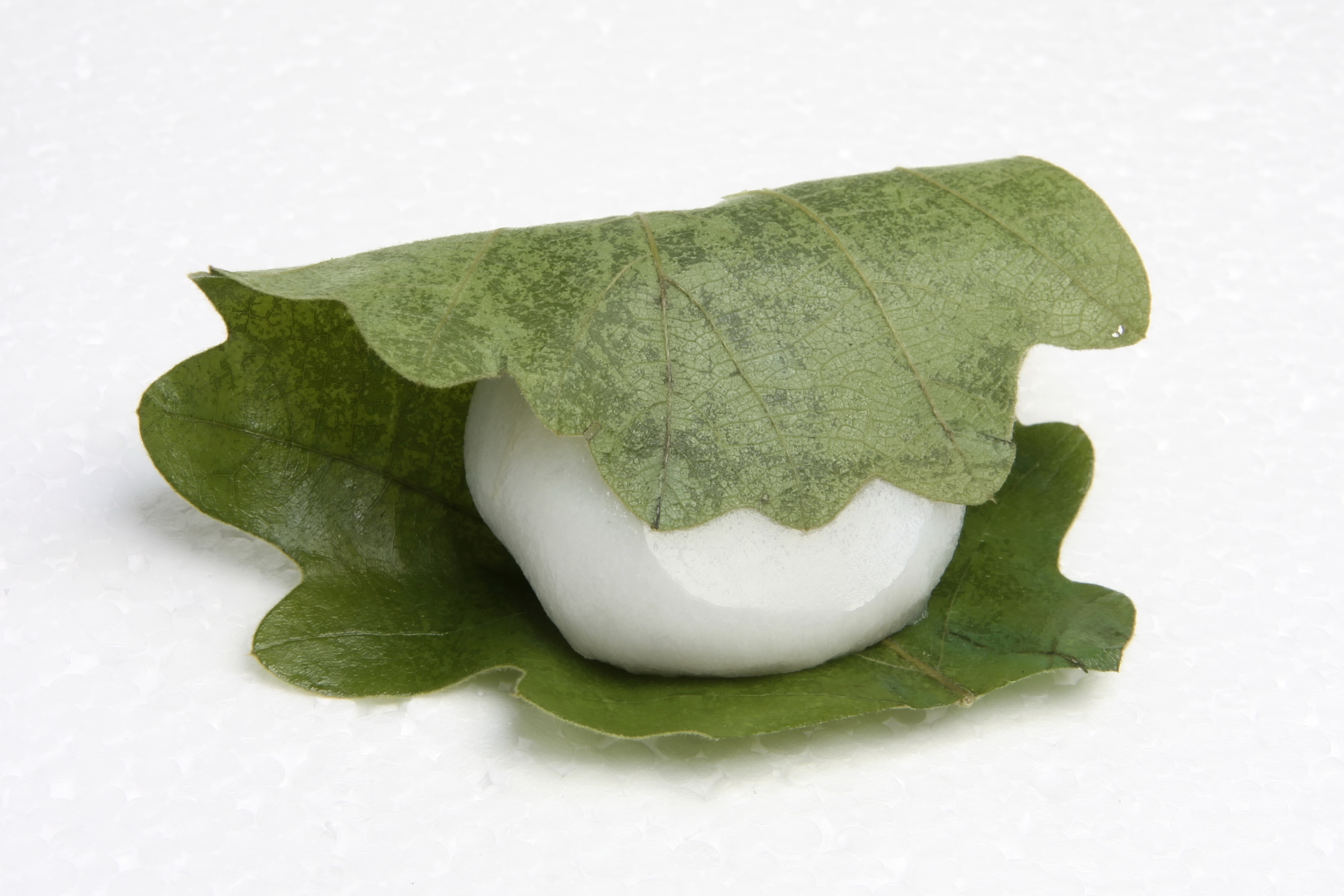
Kashiwa-mochi rice cake wrapped in oak leaf, Japan

== Culture ==
=== Symbols ===
The oak features in many coats of arms, such as that of Estonia.

The oak is a widely used symbol of strength and endurance. It is the national tree of many countries, including the US, Bulgaria, Croatia, Cyprus (golden oak), Estonia, France, Germany, Moldova, Jordan, Latvia, Lithuania, Poland, Romania, Serbia, and Wales. The common name of the city of Derry in Northern Ireland derives from the Irish: Doire, meaning 'oak'. Oak branches are displayed on some German coins, both of the former Deutsche Mark and the euro. Oak leaves symbolize rank in armed forces including those of the United States. Arrangements of oak leaves, acorns, and sprigs indicate different branches of the United States Navy staff corps officers. The oak tree is used as a symbol by several political parties and organisations. It is the symbol of the Conservative Party in the United Kingdom, and formerly of the Progressive Democrats in Ireland.

=== Religion ===
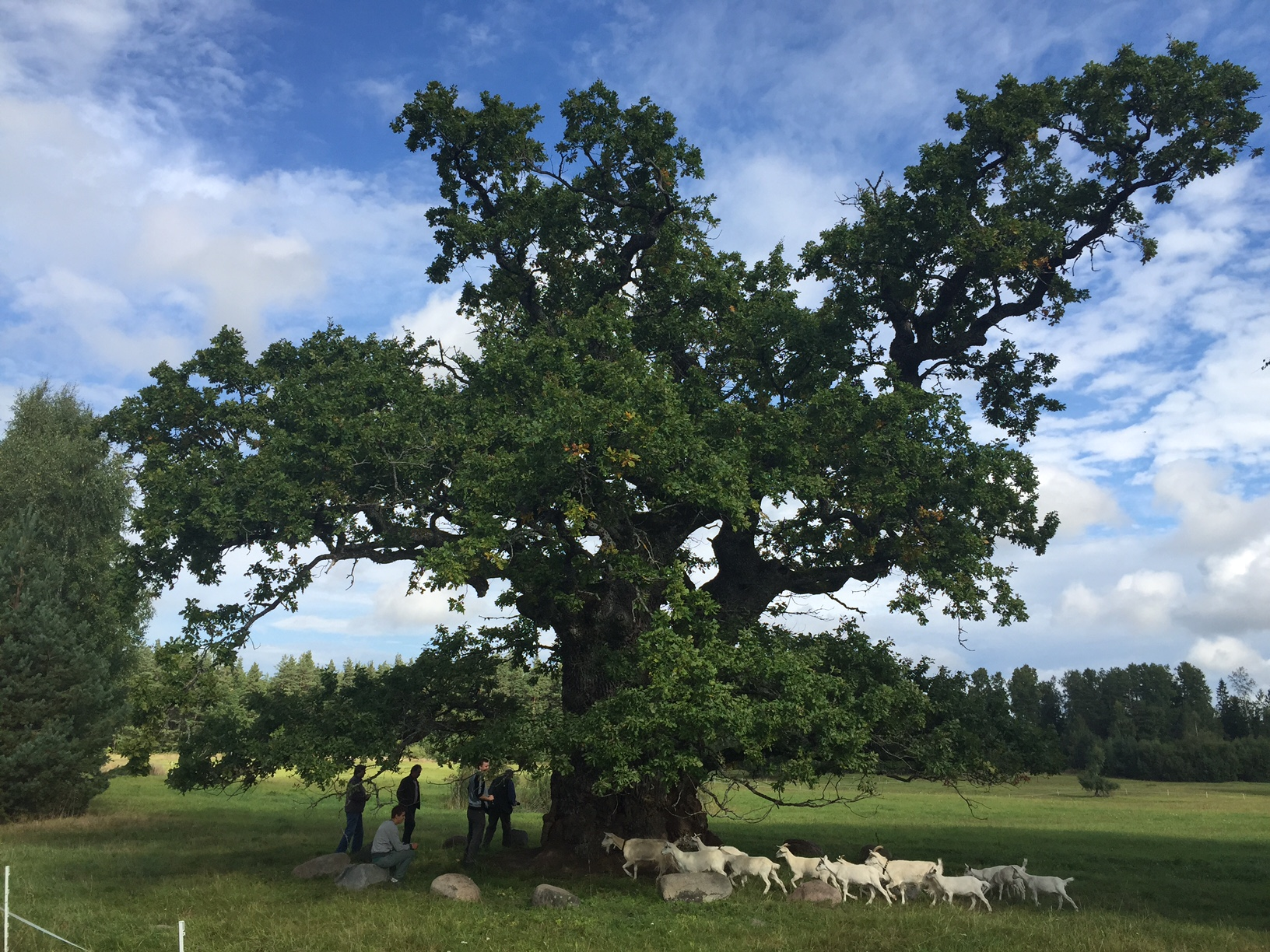
Grīdnieku ancient oak in Rumbas parish, Latvia, girth 8.27 metres (27.1 ft) 2015

The prehistoric Indo-European tribes worshipped the oak and connected it with a thunder god, and this tradition descended to many classical cultures. In Greek mythology, the oak is the tree sacred to Zeus, king of the gods. In Zeus's oracle in Dodona, Epirus, the sacred oak was the centerpiece of the precinct, and the priests would divine the pronouncements of the god by interpreting the rustling of the oak's leaves. Mortals who destroyed such trees were said to be punished by the gods since the ancient Greeks believed beings called hamadryads inhabited them. In Norse and Baltic mythology, the oak was sacred to the thunder gods Thor and Perkūnas respectively. In Celtic polytheism, the name druid, Celtic priest, is connected to Proto-Indo-European *deru, meaning oak or tree. Veneration of the oak survives in Serbian Orthodox Church tradition. Christmas celebrations include the badnjak, a branch taken from a young and straight oak ceremonially felled early on Christmas Eve morning, similar to a yule log.

=== History ===
Category: Individual oak trees

Several oak trees hold cultural importance; such as the Royal Oak in Britain, the Charter Oak in the United States, and the Guernica oak in the Basque Country. "The Proscribed Royalist, 1651", a famous painting by John Everett Millais, depicts a Royalist hiding in an oak tree while fleeing from Cromwell's forces.

In the Roman Republic, a crown of oak leaves was given to those who had saved the life of a citizen in battle; it was called the "Civic Crown". In his 17th century poem The Garden, Andrew Marvell critiqued the desire to be awarded such a leafy crown: "How vainly men themselves amaze / To win the palm, the oak, or bays; And their uncessant labors see / Crowned from some single herb or tree, ..."
