= Jean Sarrailh =

French historian

- Born: 14 October 1891; Monein, Basses-Pyrénées, France
- Died: 28 February 1964 (aged 72); Paris, France
- Occupation: Historian

Jean Sarrailh (14 October 1891 – 28 February 1964) was a French historian who specialized in the history and culture of Spain in the 18th and 19th centuries. He was rector of several universities including the University of Paris, was involved with UNESCO and was co-founder of several learned societies.

== Life ==
=== Early years (1891–1939) ===
Jean Sarrailh was born in 1891 in Monein, Basses-Pyrénées. His father and grandfather were teachers. He attended the École normale supérieure de Saint-Cloud (1911–13). He won a scholarship that let him stay in Spain in 1913–14. In June 1914 he submitted a thesis on Antonio Liñán y Verdugo, author of the Gula y Avisos de forasteros (1620). After a short course at the École supérieure of Aire-sur-l'Adour, he became a teacher at the École pratique de Commerce of Agen.

In 1916 Sarrailh was invited by Ernest Mérimée, director of the French Institute of Madrid, to come and teach there, and also act as secretary. In 1917 he enrolled in the Faculty of Letters of the University of Toulouse, and graduated in 1919. He then returned to the French Institute of Madrid, where he stayed until 1925. After returning to France Sarrailh was appointed to teach at the Lycée de Poitiers. He soon began to give a course on Spanish language and literature at the University of Poitiers Faculty of Arts, became a lecturer there in 1930 and a professor in 1934. With the outbreak of the Spanish Civil War (1936–39) he was forced to interrupt his researches into 18th century Spain in the Madrid archives and libraries.

=== Rector (1937–64) ===
In 1937, Sarrailh left his chair in Poitiers to become rector of the University of Grenoble. During World War II he moved to the University of Montpellier as rector in 1941. In 1943, the Germans forced him to retire to Monein, where he continued his research. He returned to Montpellier after the Liberation of France. Sarrailh was then general director of Physical Education and Sports in the Ministry of Education from 1944 to 1946. In 1947, Sarrailh was appointed rector of the University of Paris.

Sarrailh was involved in UNESCO from the early days of that organization, and was part of the French delegation to the International Conference in Mexico in 1947. From 1950 to 1955 he chaired the International Association of Universities. He and Paul Rivet founded the Institut des hautes études d'Amérique latine (Institute of Latin American studies) in 1954. Édouard Bonnefous was a co-founder of this institute'. He was elected a member of the Academy of Moral and Political Sciences in 1955. He chaired the French Commission of UNESCO after the death of Gaston Berger in 1960.

=== Last years (1961–64) ===
Sarrailh retired in October 1961, at the age of 70. Early in March 1962 he co-founded the Société des Hispanistes français (Society of French Hispanists) in Bordeaux, and was elected honorary president. He died on 28 February 1964 in Paris at the age of 72. His best-known work, L'Espagne éclairée de la seconde moitié du XVIIIe siècle (Enlightened Spain of the second half of the eighteenth century, 1954), is an essential reference book for students of Spanish literature in the Age of Enlightenment.

== Publications ==
- Jean Sarrailh (1927). Prosateurs espagnols contemporains (in French).
- Jean Sarrailh (1930). Un homme d'État espagnol : Martinez de La Rosa (1787-1862) (in French).
- Jean Sarrailh (1930). La Contre-Révolution sous la régence de Madrid (in French).
- Jean Sarrailh (1933). Enquêtes romantiques : France-Espagne (in French).
- Jean Sarrailh (1954). L'Espagne éclairée de la deuxième moitié du XVIII^{e} siècle (in French).

== Sources ==
- Bataillon, Marcel (1963). "Jean Sarrailh (1891–1964)". Bulletin Hispanique (in French). 65 (3).
- "BONNEFOUS Edouard" (in French). Senate of France.
- "Jean Sarrailh". Biografías y Vidas (in Spanish).
