= Marie Bartête =

French prisoner

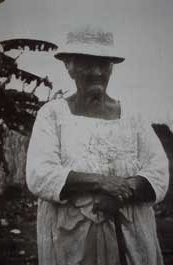
- Marie Bartête, prisoner in French Guiana
- Born: 25 February 1863; Monein, France
- Died: 13 March 1938 (aged 75); Saint-Laurent-du-Maroni, French Guiana
- Occupation: Prisoner

Marie Bartête (25 February 1863 – 13 March 1938) was a French prisoner. She was sentenced on 4 June 1888 for shoplifting, and was the last woman to die in the penal colony of French Guiana.

== Biography ==
Bartête was born on 25 February 1863 in Monein, France. She was abandoned by her mother, and became an orphan at the age of 9. She married at the age of 15, and became a widow at the age of 20. She was arrested and imprisoned for shoplifting several times. In 1888, Bartête was accused of "detestable conduct and morals". On 4 June, she was sentenced to the Prison of St-Laurent-du-Maroni in French Guiana. Under the French Loi du 27 mai 1885 sur les récidivistes (Law against Recidivism), her three convictions resulted in her being interned in a "reclusion camp" and being exiled to French Guiana as well as being legally banished from being able to return to mainland France.

Bartête received the right to marry a former convict of the penal colony, because the authorities wanted to populate the colony. In 1923, the investigative journalist Albert Londres visited Bartête in prison, and wrote down her story in Au Bagne (1923). During her stay in the prison, she contracted Elephantiasis tropica, and became disfigured. Bartête died on 13 March 1938 as the last women to die in the penal colony.

Following her death, Bartête was largely forgotten until the writer Katia-Christiane Ferré, whose father worked at a Cayenne hospital that treated Bartête, found old archives detailing her and started to research her.In 2014, a monument was erected in Monein near her place of birth.

== Bibliography ==
- Londres, Albert (1923). Au Bagne (in French). Paris: A. Michel.
- Pecassou-Camebrac, Bernadette (2011). La dernière bagnarde (in French). Paris: Flammarion. ISBN 978-2-08-122141-3.
- Ferré, Katia-Christiane (2013). Graine de bagnarde, Marie Bartete (1863-1938) (in French). Le Coudray-Macouard: Feuillage. ISBN 979-10-91739-32-0.
