= Cuqueron =

- Commune
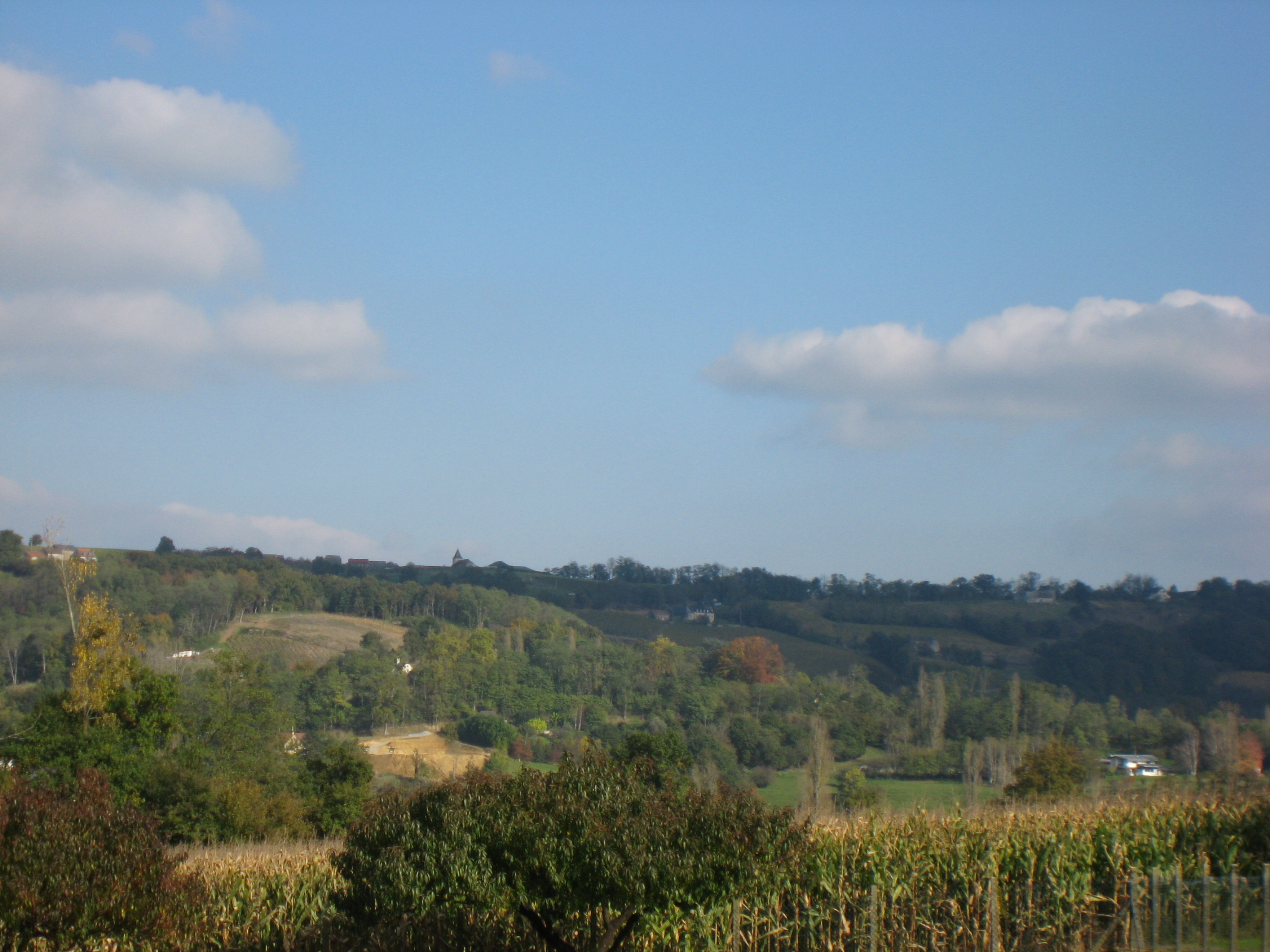
- Cuqueron seen from Monein
- Location of Cuqueron
- Location within France Location within Nouvelle-Aquitaine
- Coordinates: 43°19′06″N 0°33′03″W
- Country: France
- Region: Nouvelle-Aquitaine
- Department: Pyrénées-Atlantiques
- Arrondissement: Pau
- Canton: Le Cœur de Béarn
- Intercommunality: Lacq-Orthez

Government
  - Mayor (2020–2026): Lionel Sanchez
- Area^{1}: 3.48 km^{2} (1.34 sq mi)
- Elevation: 203 m (666 ft)
- Highest elevation: 290 m (950 ft)
- Lowest elevation: 134 m (440 ft)
- Population (2023): 189
  - Density: 54.3/km^{2} (141/sq mi)
- Time zone: UTC+01:00 (CET)
  - Summer (DST): UTC+02:00 (CEST)
- INSEE/Postal code: 64197 /64360
- ^{1} French Land Register data, which excludes lakes, ponds, glaciers > 1 km^{2} (0.386 sq mi or 247 acres) and river estuaries.

Cuqueron (French pronunciation: [kykʁɔ̃]) is a commune in the Pyrénées-Atlantiques department in south-western France.

== See also ==
- Communes of the Pyrénées-Atlantiques department
