= Cardesse =

- Commune
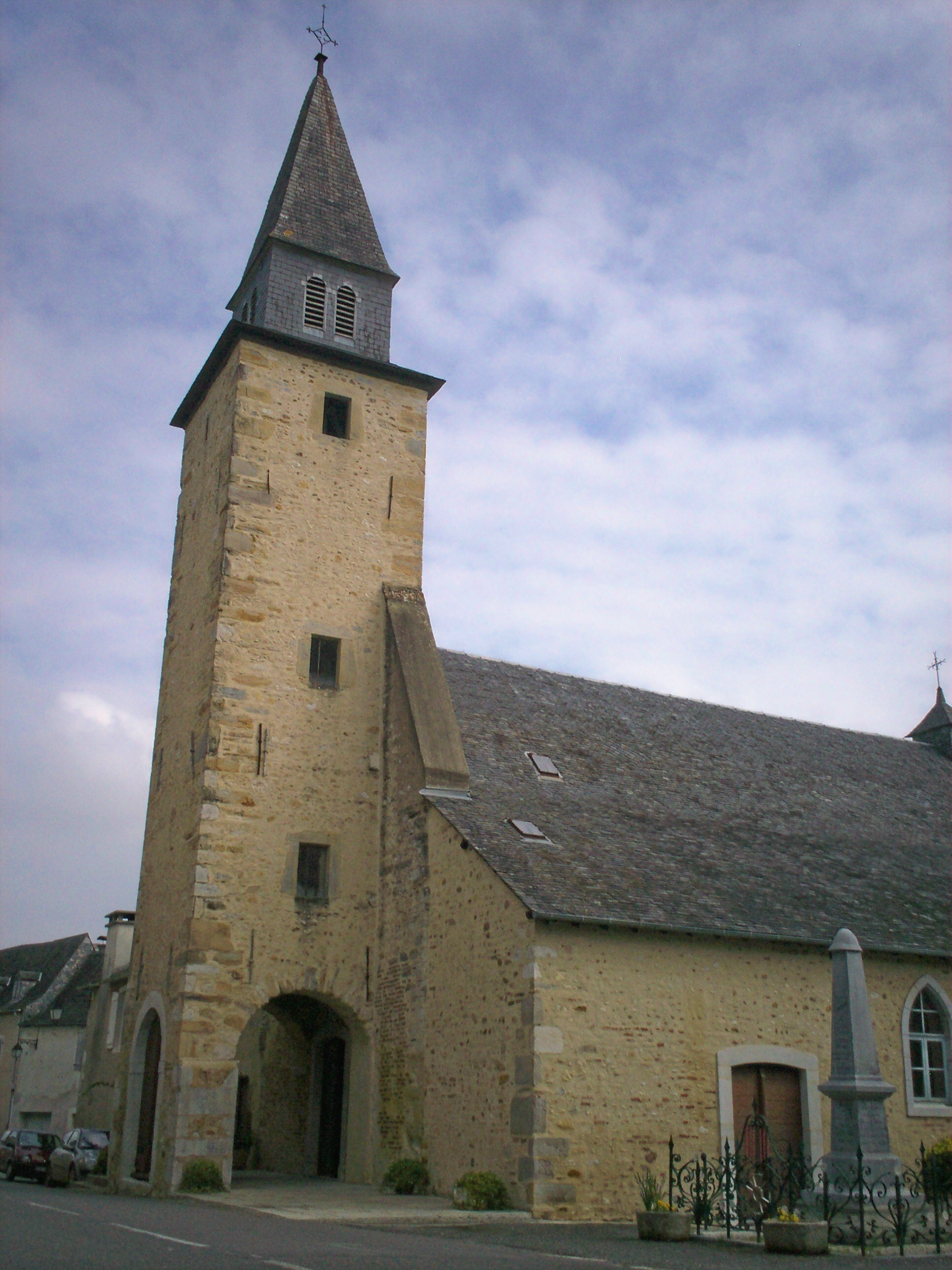
- The church of Notre-Dame-de-l'Assomption

- Coat of arms
- Location of Cardesse
- Location within France Location within Nouvelle-Aquitaine
- Coordinates: 43°15′48″N 0°35′13″W
- Country: France
- Region: Nouvelle-Aquitaine
- Department: Pyrénées-Atlantiques
- Arrondissement: Pau
- Canton: Le Cœur de Béarn
- Intercommunality: Lacq-Orthez

Government
  - Mayor (2020–2026): Mathias Ducamin
- Area^{1}: 7.67 km^{2} (2.96 sq mi)
- Elevation: 240 m (790 ft)
- Highest elevation: 329 m (1,079 ft)
- Lowest elevation: 154 m (505 ft)
- Population (2023): 293
  - Density: 38.2/km^{2} (98.9/sq mi)
- Time zone: UTC+01:00 (CET)
  - Summer (DST): UTC+02:00 (CEST)
- INSEE/Postal code: 64165 /64360
- ^{1} French Land Register data, which excludes lakes, ponds, glaciers > 1 km^{2} (0.386 sq mi or 247 acres) and river estuaries.

Cardesse (French pronunciation: [kaʁdɛs]; Occitan: Cardessa) is a commune in the Pyrénées-Atlantiques department in south-western France.

== See also ==
- Communes of the Pyrénées-Atlantiques department
