= Aussevielle =

- Commune
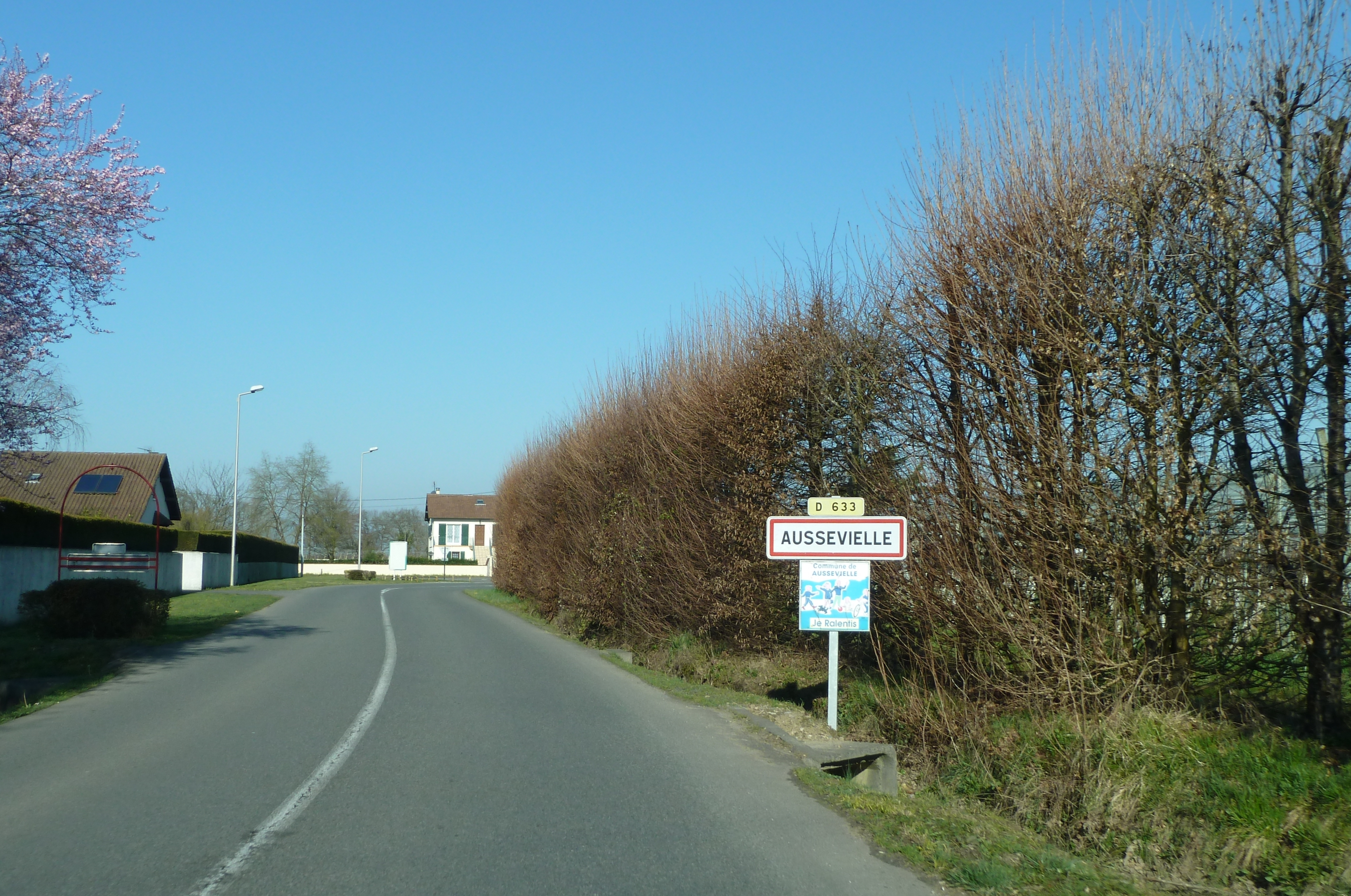
- The road into Aussevielle
- Location of Aussevielle
- Location within France Location within Nouvelle-Aquitaine
- Coordinates: 43°21′21″N 0°28′49″W
- Country: France
- Region: Nouvelle-Aquitaine
- Department: Pyrénées-Atlantiques
- Arrondissement: Pau
- Canton: Artix et Pays de Soubestre
- Intercommunality: CA Pau Béarn Pyrénées

Government
  - Mayor (2020–2026): Jacques Locatelli
- Area^{1}: 3.26 km^{2} (1.26 sq mi)
- Elevation: 152 m (499 ft)
- Highest elevation: 241 m (791 ft)
- Lowest elevation: 135 m (443 ft)
- Population (2023): 864
  - Density: 265/km^{2} (686/sq mi)
- Time zone: UTC+01:00 (CET)
  - Summer (DST): UTC+02:00 (CEST)
- INSEE/Postal code: 64080 /64230
- ^{1} French Land Register data, which excludes lakes, ponds, glaciers > 1 km^{2} (0.386 sq mi or 247 acres) and river estuaries.

Aussevielle (French pronunciation: [osvjɛl]; Occitan: Aussavièla) is a commune in the Pyrénées-Atlantiques department in the Nouvelle-Aquitaine region of south-western France.

== Geography ==
Aussevielle is located some 14 km north-west of Pau and 6 km north-west of Lescar. Access to the commune is by the D633 road from Beyrie-en-Béarn in the north-east which passes through most of the length of the commune and the village before it continues south to join the D817 near Siros. The D817 from Denguin passes through the south of the commune. European route E80 passes through the north of the commune but provides no access to the commune with the nearest exit being exit 9.1 to the east. Residential areas cover some 20% of the area with the rest farmland.

The Gave de Malapet flows through the north of the commune towards the north-west. The Ousse des Bois flows through the south of the commune westwards to join the Gave de Pau south-west of the commune.

=== Places and Hamlets ===
- Cabarrouy
- Lous Campagnots
- Labourdette
- Lacoustette
- Lombré
- Poey (glasshouse)
- Sensac
- Teulé
- Lous Vignaux

== Toponymy ==
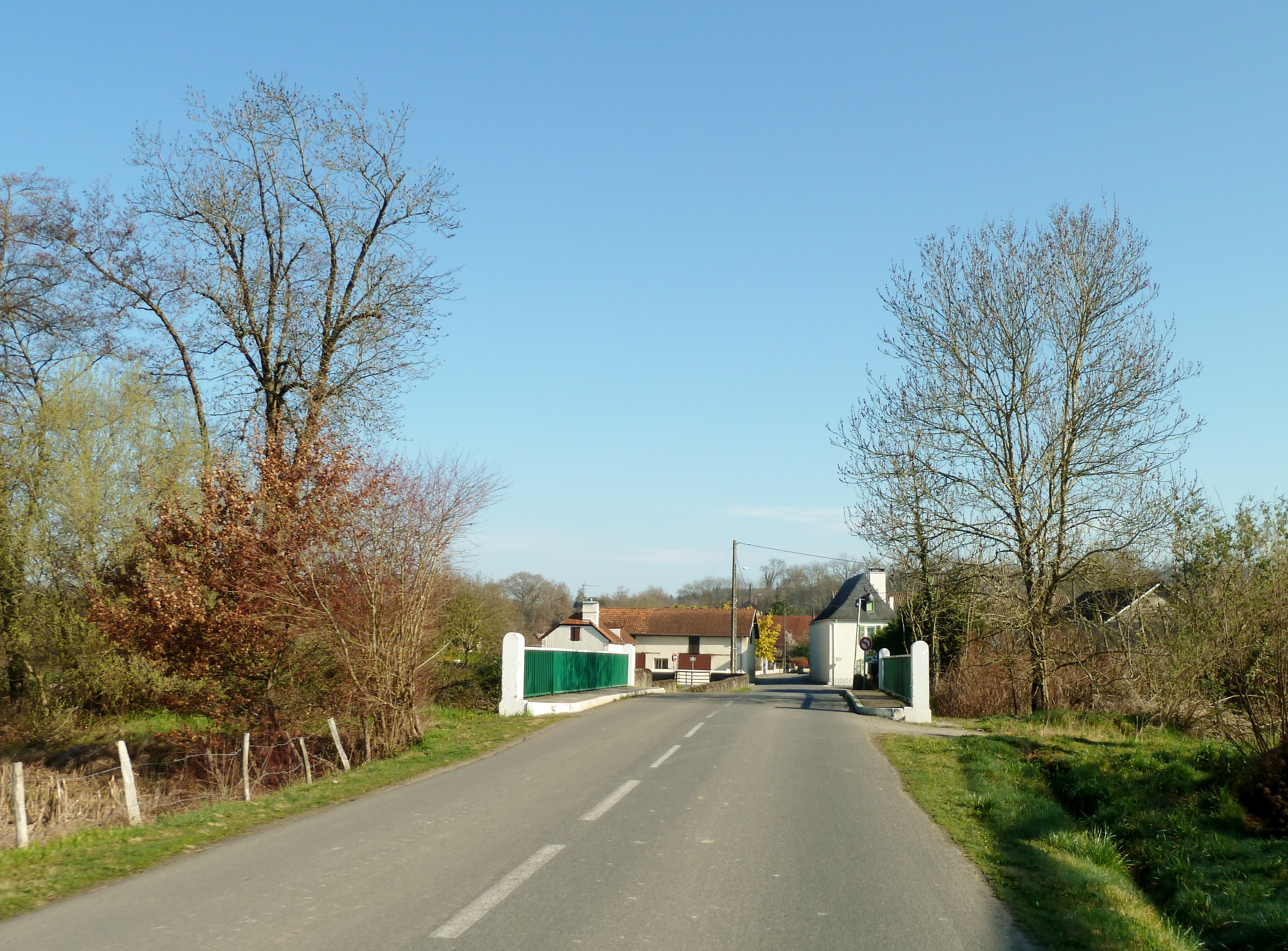
View of Aussevielle

The commune name in béarnais is Aussavièla. Michel Grosclaude indicated that the name probably comes from the name of the Ousse which rises in the commune with the Occitan vièla ("town") giving "Town of Ousse".

The following table details the origins of the commune name and other names in the commune.

Name	Spelling	Date	Source	Page	Origin	Description
Aussevielle	Ause-Vielle	1342	Raymond	17	Pardies	Village
	Ossebiele	1349	Raymond	17	Pardies	
	Aucevielle	1385	Raymond	17	Census	
	Osse-Bielle	1402	Raymond	17	Census	
	Aussabiela	1538	Raymond	17	Reformation	
	Aussavielle	1675	Raymond	17	Reformation	
	Saint-Jean d'Aussevielle	1754	Raymond	17	Denguin	
	Aussaviele	1750	Cassini			
Casenave	Casenave	1753	Raymond	43	Enumeration	Farm and Fief, Vassal of the Viscounts of Béarn
Domec	L'ostau deu Domec	1538	Raymond	55	Reformation	Fief, Vassal of the Viscounts of Béarn

Sources:

- Raymond: Topographic Dictionary of the Department of Basses-Pyrenees, 1863, on the page numbers indicated in the table. (in French)
- Grosclaude: Toponymic Dictionary of communes, Béarn, 2006 (in French)
- Cassini: Cassini Map from 1750

Origins:

- Pardies: Notaries of Pardies
- Census: Census of Béarn
- Reformation: Reformation of Béarn
- Denguin: Terrier of Denguin
- Enumeration: Enumeration of Ausseville

== History ==
Paul Raymond noted on page 17 of his 1863 dictionary that in 1385 Aussevielle had 10 fires and depended on the bailiwick of Pau then in 1654 reverted to the Barony of Denguin by letters patent from Louis XIV.

== Administration ==
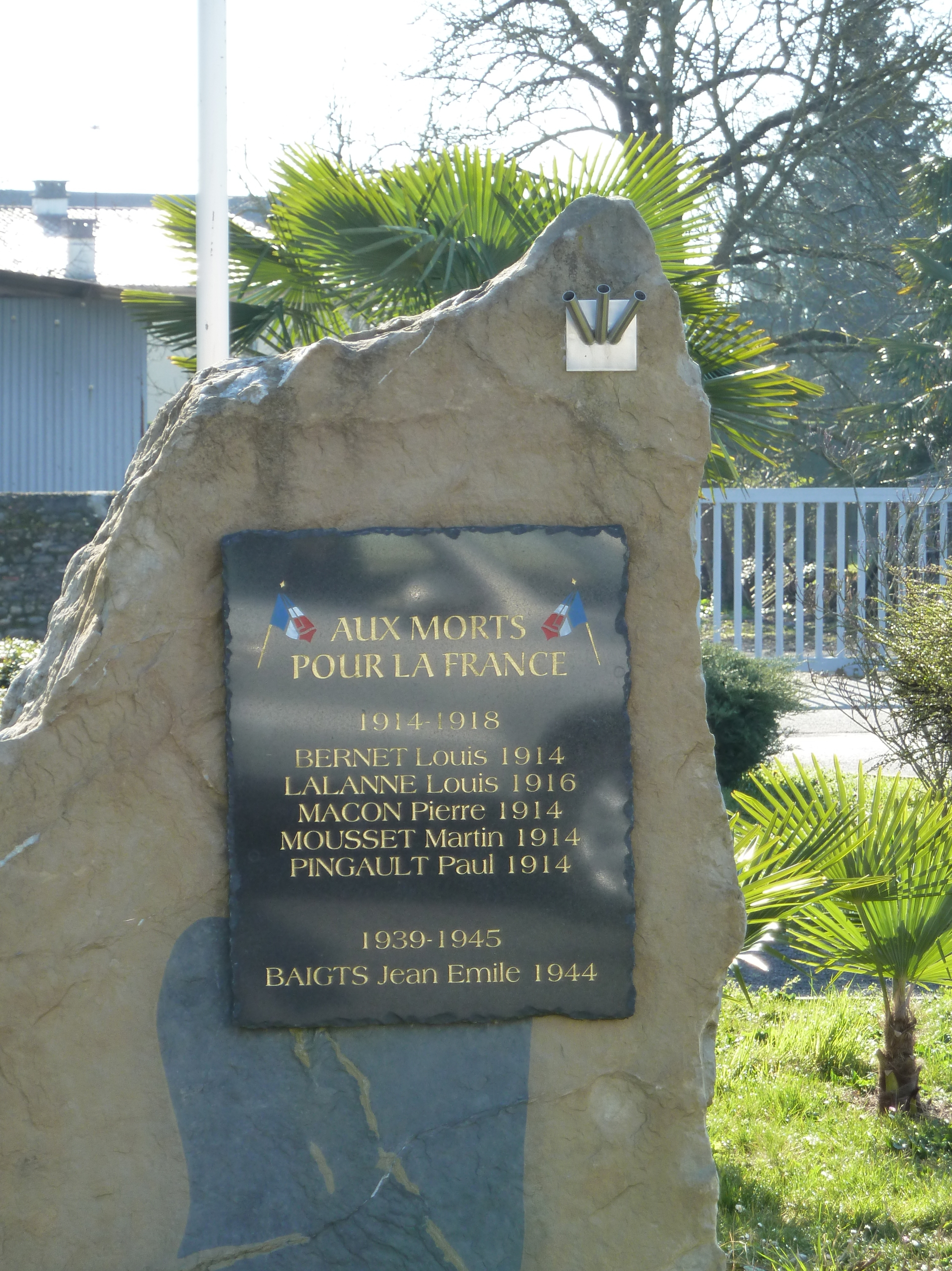
The War Memorial

List of Successive Mayors

From	To	Name
1813	1831	Jean Pierre Laborde Teule-Sensacq
1831	1835	Jean Campagnolle
1835	1839	Jean Laulhere
1839	1840	Jean Campagnolle
1840	1842	Jean Laulhere
1842	1860	Joseph Marie Teule-Sensacq
1860	1870	Jean Tercq
1870	1881	Michel Firmin Teule-Sensacq
1881	1884	Joseph Marie Firmin Teule-Sensacq
1884	1900	Michel Teule-Sensacq
1900	1908	Pierre Plasteig-Cassou
1908	1912	Joseph Teule-Sensacq
1912	1925	Pierre Plasteig-Cassou
1925	1953	Justin Coustille-Cossou
1953	1970	Aimé Coustille-Cossou
1970	1983	Lucien Labastie
1983	1995	Jean Michel Daury
1995	2026	Jacques Locatelli

=== Inter-communality ===
The commune is part of four inter-communal structures:

- the Communauté d'agglomération Pau Béarn Pyrénées;
- the SIVU for home help for the elderly of the Canton of Lescar;
- the AEP association of Lescar region;
- the Siros, Aussevielle, Poey-de-Lescar inter-communal association for water treatment in the Val de l'Ousse;

== Demography ==
The inhabitants of the commune are known as Ausseviellois or Aussevielloises in French.

Historical population

Year	Pop.	±% p.a.
1793	180	—
1821	219	+0.70%
1846	198	−0.40%
1872	147	−1.14%
1901	119	−0.73%
1926	75	−1.83%
1946	78	+0.20%
1962	99	+1.50%
1968	126	+4.10%

Year	Pop.	±% p.a.
1975	185	+5.64%
1982	258	+4.87%
1990	406	+5.83%
1999	479	+1.85%
2007	686	+4.59%
2012	784	+2.71%
2017	785	+0.03%
2023	864	+1.61%

Source: EHESS and INSEE

== Culture and heritage ==
=== Civil heritage ===
The old Lay Abbey is today the Town Hall.

=== Religious heritage ===
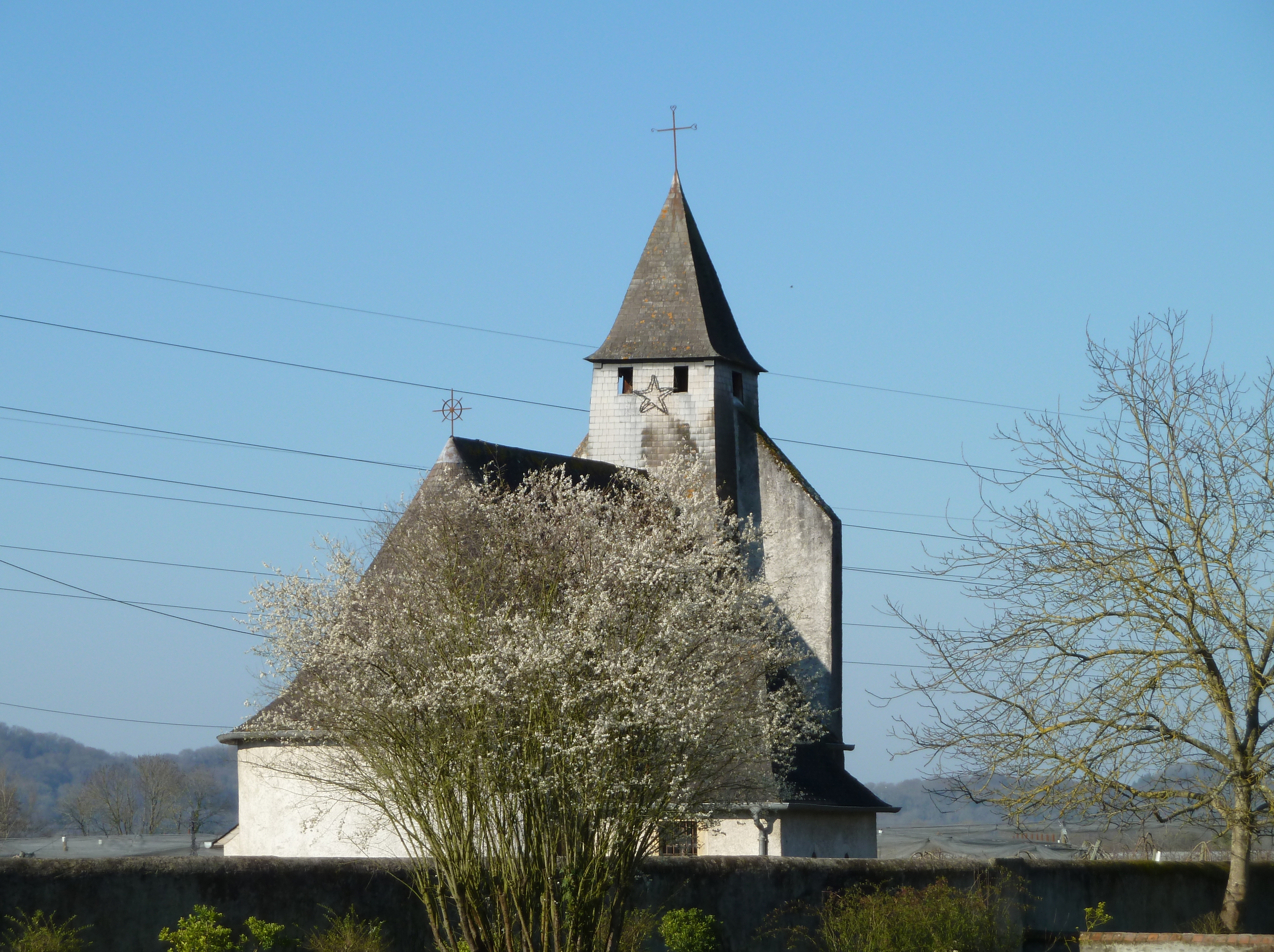
The Church of Saint John the Baptist

The Church of Saint John the Baptist probably dates to the end of the Middle Ages.

== Facilities ==
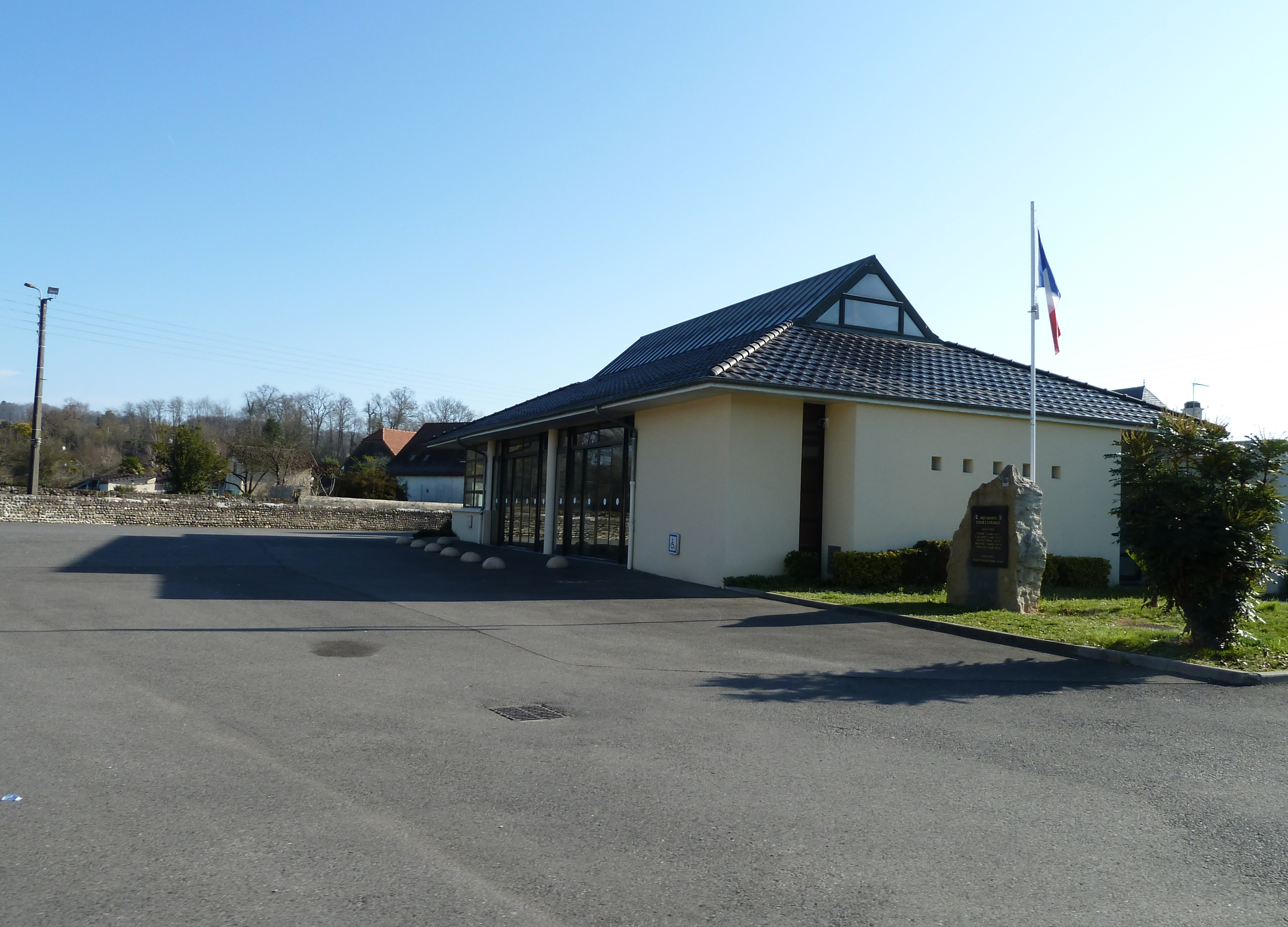
The Community Hall

=== Education ===
Siros and Aussevielle are associated through an Inter-communal Educational Regrouping (RPI). The commune has a nursery school. There is a primary school in Siros.

== Notable people linked to the commune ==
- Roger Lapassade, born in 1912 at Aussevielle and died in 1999 at Orthez, a writer and Occitan poet.

== See also ==
- Communes of the Pyrénées-Atlantiques department
