= Alexis Arette =

French farmer, writer, and politician (1927–2023)

Member of the Regional Council of Aquitaine
- In office 1986–1998

President of the Fédération française de l’agriculture
- In office 1982–1991
- Preceded by: Gildas Ezanno
- Succeeded by: position abolished

Personal details
- Born: 20 June 1927 Momas, France
- Died: 15 January 2023 (aged 95) Aressy, France
- Party: FN
- Occupation: Farmer; Writer

Alexis Arette-Lendresse (20 June 1927 – 15 January 2023), also known as Alexis Arette-Hourquet, was a French farmer, writer, and politician of the National Front. He was associated with the Organisation armée secrète.

== Biography ==
Arette left Metropolitan France for French Indochina in 1949 as a red beret. After being wounded, he was honored by the Legion of Honour and awarded a Médaille militaire. He returned to France in 1953 and took over his parents' farm and joined the Centre National des Jeunes Agriculteurs. In 1967, he served as director of the Festival de Siros and became vice-president of the Académie de Béarn in 1970. From 1982 to 1991, he was president of the Fédération française de l'agriculture.

In 1986, Arette was elected to the Regional Council of Aquitaine on the list of the National Front, and re-elected in 1992.

In 2001, Arette published the book Les Dieux du crépuscule, which theorized that mad cow disease had been instrumented by the Americans.

Arette died on 15 January 2023, at the age of 95.

== Works ==
- Les Damnés de la terre (1994)
- On m'appelait Bleu de Noir, Chroniques d'Indochine (1997)
- Les Dieux du crépuscule (1998)
- L'Éternel et le temps des dieux : propos d'un paysan chrétien à un ami païen (2001)
- Nos bêtes d'Aquitaine dans la langue, l'histoire et le légendaire gascons (2003)
- Nos fleurs d'Aquitaine dans la langue, la sorcellerie et la médecine gasconnes (2003)
- La Longue marche des Aquitains (2007)
- Fils d'Homme, je t'ai fait sentinelle (2013)
