= Aubertin =

- Commune
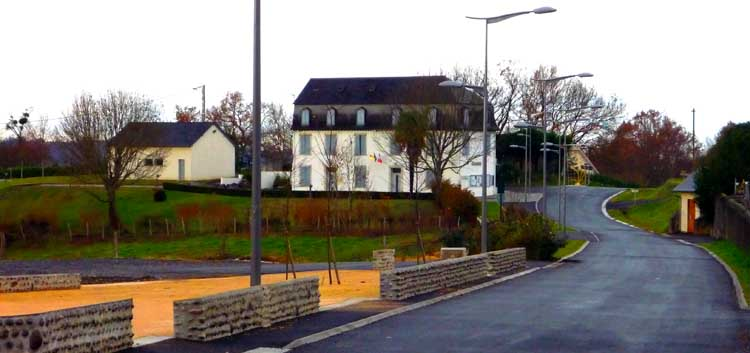
- Approach to the Town Hall
- Location of Aubertin
- Location within France Location within Nouvelle-Aquitaine
- Coordinates: 43°16′29″N 0°28′57″W
- Country: France
- Region: Nouvelle-Aquitaine
- Department: Pyrénées-Atlantiques
- Arrondissement: Pau
- Canton: Billère et Coteaux de Jurançon
- Intercommunality: CA Pau Béarn Pyrénées

Government
  - Mayor (2020–2026): Martine Rodriguez
- Area^{1}: 17.16 km^{2} (6.63 sq mi)
- Elevation: 281 m (922 ft)
- Highest elevation: 347 m (1,138 ft)
- Lowest elevation: 150 m (490 ft)
- Population (2023): 671
  - Density: 39.1/km^{2} (101/sq mi)
- Time zone: UTC+01:00 (CET)
  - Summer (DST): UTC+02:00 (CEST)
- INSEE/Postal code: 64072 /64290
- ^{1} French Land Register data, which excludes lakes, ponds, glaciers > 1 km^{2} (0.386 sq mi or 247 acres) and river estuaries.

Aubertin (French pronunciation: [obɛʁtɛ̃]) is a commune in the Pyrénées-Atlantiques department in the Nouvelle-Aquitaine region of south-western France.

== Geography ==
Aubertin is located in Béarn some 10 km west of Pau and 8 km north-west of Gan. Access to the commune is by the D146 from Artiguelouve in the north-east which passes through the north of the commune and goes west to Lacommande. Access to the village is by the D346 which branches south from the D146 in the commune and continues through the village to join the D24 some 6 km west of Gan. The commune has a mix of forest and farmland throughout its territory.

The Baïse forms the western border of the commune as it flows north to join the Gave de Pau at Abidos. The Juscle rises in the south-east of the commune and flows north to join the Gave de Pau at Bésingrand. Each river gathers many small tributaries that rise in the commune.

== Places and hamlets ==
- Arizet
- Arrouset
- Arrouzes
- Baherle
- Bahette
- Barbe
- Barrere
- Barrot
- Baudorre
- Bayle
- Bengueres
- Benoit
- Benterou
- Bernat
- Bertrand
- Beteille
- Blazy
- Bonneton
- Bordechy
- Bory
- Bouchet
- Burret
- Cabarrecq
- Calotte
- Camy
- Casedeyan
- Cassou
- Catihaut
- Caussit
- Caussitou
- Cazenave
- Chicot
- Chounet
- Clamens
- Claverie
- Constantine
- Couy
- Crasman
- Cuyala
- David
- Espa
- Haget
- Heroulet
- Heugas
- Hourat
- Hourcade
- Istehnou
- Jagou
- Joliment
- Labarthe
- Labasse
- Labat
- Labegorre
- Labesque
- Labory
- Lacarrieu
- Lacoste
- Lacrouts
- Lagrave
- Lahitole
- Lamasouere
- Lanardonne
- Lapet
- Laplume
- Lardit
- Larriscat
- Larriu
- Laymar
- Lebe
- Lembeye
- Lespees
- Lestanguet
- Lous
- Loustau
- Mazou
- Mene
- Mesple
- Mialou
- Miramont
- Mirassou
- Modet
- Montagnette
- Montis
- Mourterat
- Mourthe
- Navailles
- Palassou
- Palou
- Pargade
- Pedane
- Penen
- Pepicq
- Perry
- Peyrenere
- Poeydevant
- Porte
- Poumade
- Puyade
- Reyau
- Rontignon
- Saliou
- Sarthou
- Serrot
- Setze
- Soldat
- Talabot
- Talet
- Tiret
- Toulas
- Tucou
- Turoun
- Vignau

== Toponymy ==
Among the hypotheses on the origin of the name Aubertin, Michel Grosclaude favours that of a Gascon man's name (diminutive of Aubert) or the Latin Albertinus rather than the German Adalbehrt.

The following table details the origins of the commune name and other names in the commune.

Name	Spelling	Date	Source	Page	Origin	Description
Aubertin	Albertinus	1128	Raymond	16	Marca	Village
	Auberti	13th century	Raymond	16	Fors de Béarn	
	Aubertii	14th century	Raymond	16	Census	
	Auberty	1548	Raymond	16	Reformation	
	Sent Blasi d'Aubertin	1608	Raymond	16	Insinuations	
Jagou	Jaguo	1385	Raymond	84	Census	Farm
	Jagou	1863	Raymond	84		

Sources:

- Raymond: Topographic Dictionary of the Department of Basses-Pyrenees, 1863, on the page numbers indicated in the table. (in French)

Origins:

- Marca: Pierre de Marca, History of Béarn.
- Fors de Béarn
- Census: Census of Béarn
- Reformation: Reformation of Béarn
- Insinuations: Insinuations of the Diocese of Oloron

== History ==
When the name Aubertin appears in texts from the beginning of the 12th century, it is difficult to associate it with a specific territory. It is known that there was a beech grove at Aubertin (Faget d'Aubertii), in the middle of which Gaston IV of Béarn, called le Croisé (The Crusader), began building a hospital in the years 1115–1118. This foundation was challenged by the Lord of Bedosse and his descendants who claimed ownership of the soil. The Albertine charter signed in 1128 resolved the dispute and allowed the development of the hospital which was opened shortly after a church, a cloister and a cemetery. Farmland extended from the left bank of the Baïse to the top of the hill to the west on the territory of the present village of Lacommande.

At the beginning of the 13th century, this place became the Commandery of Aubertin – the main establishment of the Priory of Sainte-Christine-du-Somport on the northern slopes of the Pyrenees. By contrast, the origin of the Bedosse family and the extension of their domains remains unknown. For centuries Monein continued to claim ownership of this enclave of the Commandery of Aubertin.

Texts from the middle of the 12th century also report a lordship at Artiguelouve which extended from the Gave de Pau to the Baïse on the current communes of Artiguelouve and Aubertin. So, in 1160 Guillaume of Artiguelouve and one called Loup Bergunh sold the land and woods located on the right bank of the Bayse for grazing their herds to the priory of Sainte-Christine-du-Somport and the Aubertin hospital.

Although the territory of the present village of Aubertin has long remained in the orbit of the lordship of Artiguelouve, from the beginning most people seem to have attended the church of the Commandery. The count by Gaston Febus in 1385 reported a parish of Aubertii distinct from that of Artiguelobe. It comprised a total of 46 fires including 3 which were explicitly at Aubertin the hospital.

In 1402, the lord of Artiguelouve made common cause with the commandery of Aubertin in a lawsuit between them and the community of Monein but in 1538 the commander of Aubertin, Jean de Borau, reported that Arnaud Guilhem d'Artiguelouve had usurped the rights of the Commandery. Relations between the two communities were close but fluctuated.

When Arnaud Guilhem d'Artiguelouve married Anne d'Albret on 9 February 1534 he was called Lord of Artiguelouve, Aubertin, and Montardon and appeared to be at the height of his glory. The situation gradually deteriorated over the generations. In 1555 his son, Arnaud, sold half the tithes from Artiguelouve and Aubertin to Peyrot de Pedelaborde of Lagor. He was soon no longer designated as Lord of Artiguelouve and Aubertin which suggested the final sale of the lordship of Montardon. On the other hand, the inhabitants of Aubertin had some autonomy in the management of their affairs as they were represented by a trustee and 5 aldermen from 1570 during some events of the Protestant Reformation. Around 1583 Arnaud d'Artiguelouve afiefed the woods of Aubertin as surety for a loan. Bernard, who succeeded Arnaud, remained lord of Artiguelouve and Aubertin but debts accumulated. His son John was forced to sell the chateau and lands of Aubertin to François de Navailles on 30 June 1640. Finally, Jean sold the lordship of Artiguelouve itself to Pierre de Fouron on 11 April 1642.

30 June 1640 was a crucial date in the history of Aubertin. It affirmed the identity of the village and marked the emergence of a new centre of power from an Artiguelouve lordship which disintegrated to a commandery which, after the Reformation, passed to the control of the Barnabites of Lescar. Five generations of Navailles-Mirepeix would follow in Aubertin. The last, Louis-François, gave a reckoning of his domain of Aubertin for the Parliament of Navarre on 8 July 1776. This document gives a fairly accurate picture of the lordship of Aubertin before the French Revolution.

Some years before, in 1773, he initiated a project to build a church near the chateau with the support of the Bishop of Oloron. This project was not successful because Louis-François de Navailles emigrated to Spain during the Revolution. The Aubertin people felt duty-bound to continue and financed most of the Church of Saint-Blaise in Lacommande, the adjacent cemetery, and the church rectory, although two separate communes were created in 1790. They continued, however, to be only one parish until 1867 when the opening of a church in Aubertin and a new historical turning point: a village centre could finally develop around its bell tower, to which was added a cemetery, manse, town hall, and a school.

== Administration ==
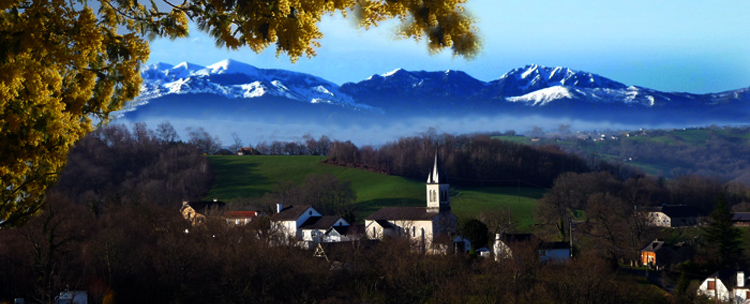
Panorama of Aubertin

List of Successive Mayors

From	To	Name
1790	1805	Bascourret
1805	1807	Pouey-Davant
1807	1811	Jean Labory
1811	1815	Bascourret
1815	1816	Jean Louis Poey-Davant
1816	1831	Bayle
1831	1842	Jean Reyau
1842	1848	Augustin Casalet
1848	1853	Jean Hourcade
1853	1857	Augustin Casalet
1857	1865	Jean Marie Labory
1865	1871	Jean Vignau
1871	1876	Jean Larrague
1876	1892	Barthélémy Hourcade
1892	1896	Jean Sarragnacq
1896	1914	Joseph Loustalot
1914	1919	Ferdinand Bascourret
1919	1924	Joseph Loustalot
1924	1925	Jérôme Loune
1925	1944	Pierre Labayrade
1944	1945	Lucien Darribau
1945	1965	François Cassieula
1965	1976	René Camy
1976	2001	Lucien Hondet
2001	2008	Philippe Boillot
2014	2026	Martine Rodriguez

=== Inter-communality ===
The commune is part of five inter-communal structures:

- the Communauté d'agglomération Pau Béarn Pyrénées;
- the SIVOM of the Canton of Lasseube;
- the joint association for the Gave de Pau;
- the SIVU for the development and management of the rivers in the Baises basin;
- the association for the development of the Drainage basin of the Juscle and its tributaries;

== Demography ==
The inhabitants of the commune are known as Aubertinois or Aubertinoises in French.

Historical population

Year	Pop.	±% p.a.
1793	1,150	—
1800	1,103	−0.59%
1806	1,168	+0.96%
1821	970	−1.23%
1831	1,065	+0.94%
1836	1,102	+0.69%
1841	1,098	−0.07%
1846	1,081	−0.31%
1851	1,089	+0.15%
1856	1,002	−1.65%
1861	901	−2.10%
1866	912	+0.24%
1872	912	+0.00%
1876	928	+0.44%
1881	851	−1.72%
1886	854	+0.07%
1891	826	−0.66%
1896	850	+0.57%
1901	825	−0.60%

Year	Pop.	±% p.a.
1906	822	−0.07%
1911	796	−0.64%
1921	644	−2.10%
1926	626	−0.57%
1931	573	−1.75%
1936	554	−0.67%
1946	533	−0.39%
1954	473	−1.48%
1962	456	−0.46%
1968	398	−2.24%
1975	455	+1.93%
1982	571	+3.30%
1990	607	+0.77%
1999	632	+0.45%
2007	634	+0.04%
2012	657	+0.72%
2017	656	−0.03%
2023	671	+0.38%

Source: EHESS and INSEE

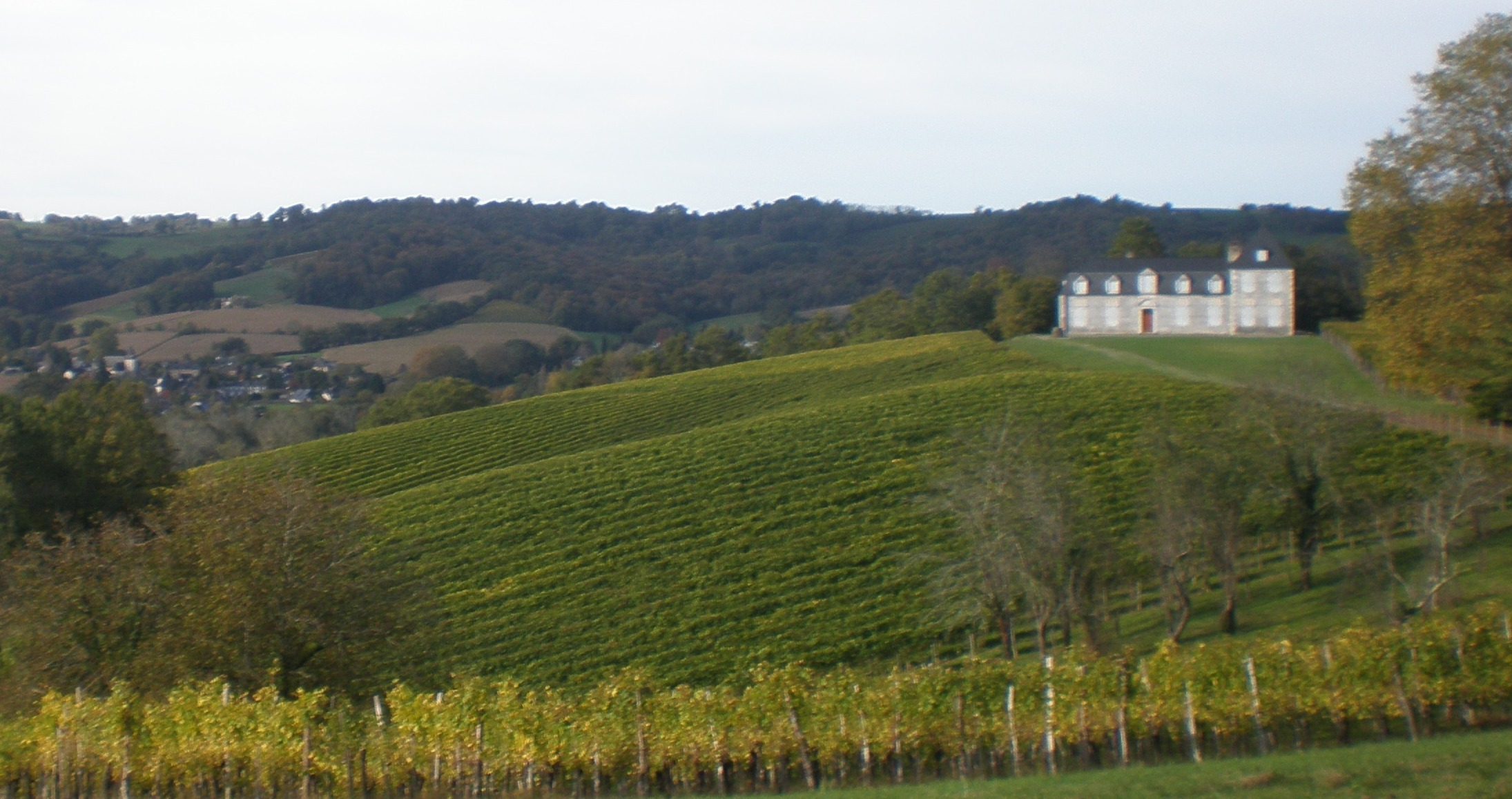
The Chateau and the countryside

== Economy ==
- The commune is part of the Appellation d'origine contrôlée zone of Jurançon AOC and Béarn AOC. Economic activity is mainly agricultural. Aubertin is also part of the AOC zone of Ossau-iraty.
- In 1966, the Société Nationale des Pétroles d’Aquitaine (SNPA - now part of Elf Aquitaine) discovered gas in Aubertin. Two gas wells are still active.

== Culture and heritage ==
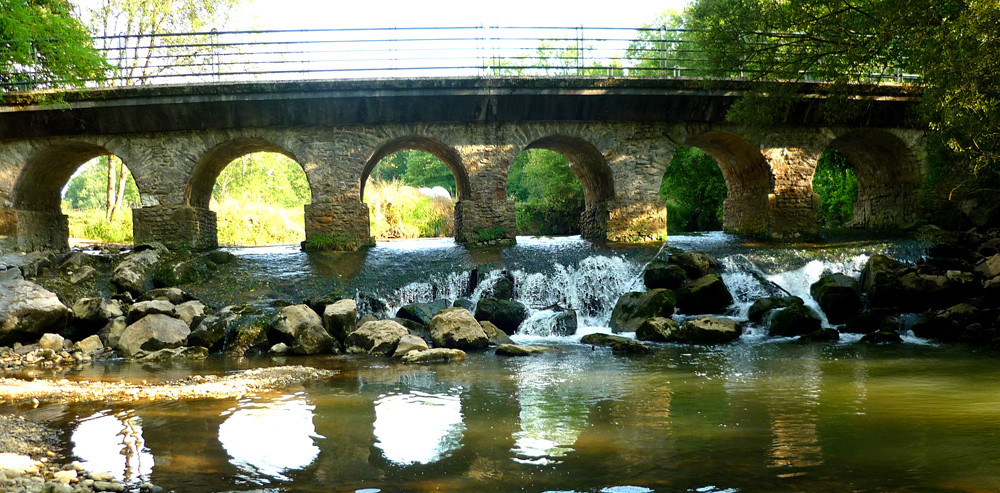
Bridge at Goua de Labat

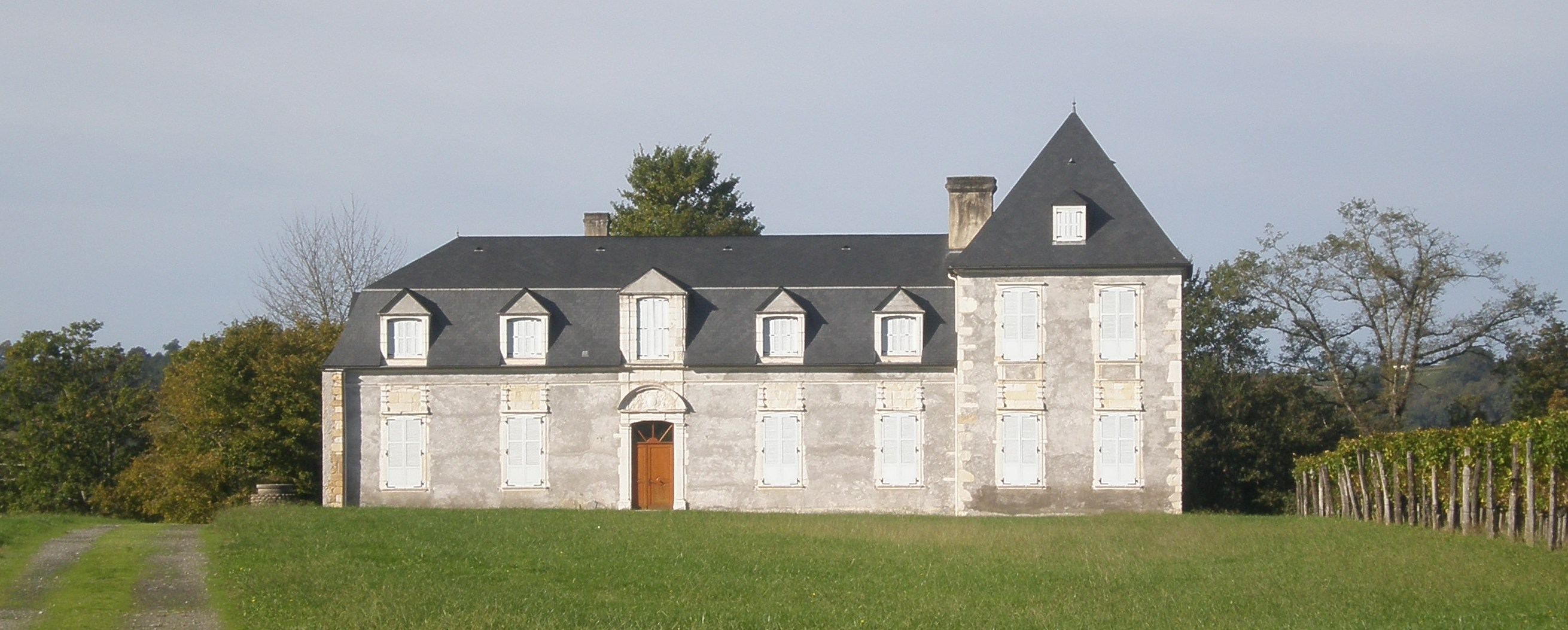
Château de Navailles

=== Civil heritage ===
- A very old Bridge over the Bayse at Goua-de-Labat
- The Château de Navailles

=== Religious heritage ===
The 'Church of Saint-Augustin (1859) is registered as a historical monument. A porch was added to the tower in the 20th century.

- A Chapel was built just before the French Revolution in another place near the Château de Navailles, but it was destroyed before it was used.

== Facilities ==
- There is a primary school built in 1880 with a canteen and a fronton in the courtyard.
- There is a public sports facility with a bowling pitch, tennis courts, and a handball court.

== Notable people linked to the commune ==
- Jean Reyau, Mayor of Aubertin from 1831 to 1842, was a bodyguard for Louis XVIII.
- Albert Peyroutet, born in Aubertin in 1931 and died in 2009, was an Occitan writer and an associate professor of English and Occitan.
- René Camy, teacher, mayor, and General Councillor of the Canton of Lasseube (1965-1976), Chevalier of the Legion of Honour with academic palms.

== See also ==
- Communes of the Pyrénées-Atlantiques department

=== External links ===
- Aubertin on Géoportail, National Geographic Institute (IGN) website (in French)
- Aubertin on the 1750 Cassini Map
