= Bizanos =

- Commune
- Coat of arms
- Location of Bizanos
- Location within France Location within Nouvelle-Aquitaine
- Coordinates: 43°17′18″N 0°21′01″W
- Country: France
- Region: Nouvelle-Aquitaine
- Department: Pyrénées-Atlantiques
- Arrondissement: Pau
- Canton: Pau-3
- Intercommunality: CA Pau Béarn Pyrénées

Government
  - Mayor (2020–2026): Jean-Louis Calderoni
- Area^{1}: 4.42 km^{2} (1.71 sq mi)
- Elevation: 187 m (614 ft)
- Highest elevation: 233 m (764 ft)
- Lowest elevation: 174 m (571 ft)
- Population (2023): 4,592
  - Density: 1,040/km^{2} (2,690/sq mi)
- Time zone: UTC+01:00 (CET)
  - Summer (DST): UTC+02:00 (CEST)
- INSEE/Postal code: 64132 /64320
- ^{1} French Land Register data, which excludes lakes, ponds, glaciers > 1 km^{2} (0.386 sq mi or 247 acres) and river estuaries.

Bizanos (French pronunciation: [bizanɔs]; Occitan: Visanòs [bizaˈnɔs]) is a commune in the Pyrénées-Atlantiques department in southwestern France.

== Population ==
Historical population
Year	Pop.	±% p.a.
1968	4,039	—
1975	4,249	+0.73%
1982	4,134	−0.39%
1990	4,298	+0.49%
1999	4,673	+0.93%
2007	4,613	−0.16%
2012	4,767	+0.66%
2017	4,626	−0.60%
2023	4,592	−0.12%
Source: INSEE

== Sports ==
The home ground of local football club Pau FC, the Nouste Camp, is located in Bizanos.

== See also ==
- Communes of the Pyrénées-Atlantiques department
- Jean-Michel Larqué
