= Canton of Pau-3 =

Coordinates: 43.30°N 0.35°W

The canton of Pau-3 is an administrative division of the Pyrénées-Atlantiques department, southwestern France. It was created at the French canton reorganisation which came into effect in March 2015. Its seat is in Pau.

It consists of the following communes:

1. Bizanos
2. Mazères-Lezons
3. Pau (partly)
