= Lacommande =

- Commune
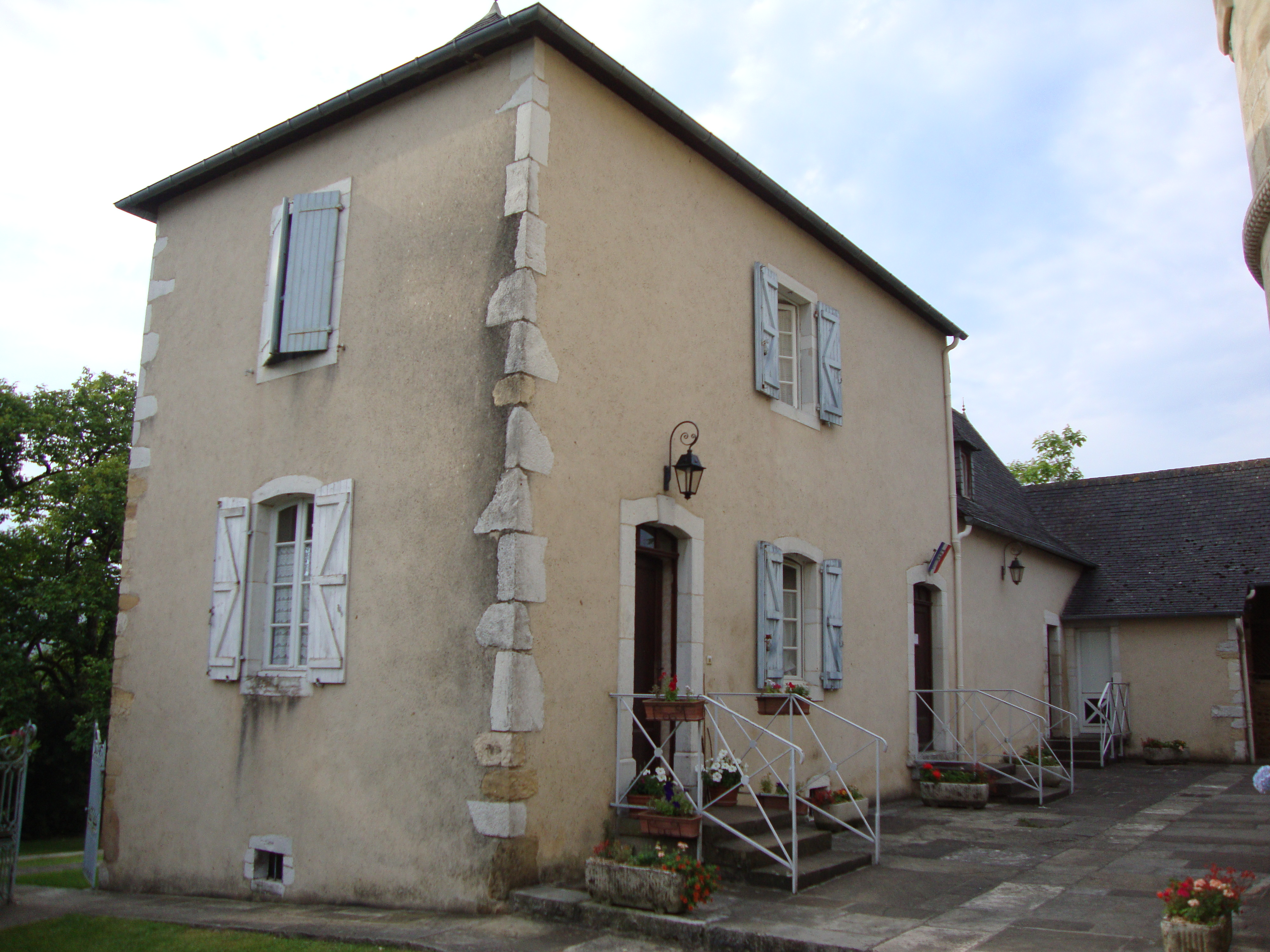
- Town Hall
- Location of Lacommande
- Location within France Location within Nouvelle-Aquitaine
- Coordinates: 43°16′42″N 0°30′27″W
- Country: France
- Region: Nouvelle-Aquitaine
- Department: Pyrénées-Atlantiques
- Arrondissement: Pau
- Canton: Le Cœur de Béarn
- Intercommunality: Lacq-Orthez

Government
  - Mayor (2020–2026): Nathalie Dupleix
- Area^{1}: 3.33 km^{2} (1.29 sq mi)
- Highest elevation: 262 m (860 ft)
- Lowest elevation: 150 m (490 ft)
- Population (2023): 172
  - Density: 51.7/km^{2} (134/sq mi)
- Time zone: UTC+01:00 (CET)
  - Summer (DST): UTC+02:00 (CEST)
- INSEE/Postal code: 64299 /64360
- ^{1} French Land Register data, which excludes lakes, ponds, glaciers > 1 km^{2} (0.386 sq mi or 247 acres) and river estuaries.

Lacommande (French pronunciation: [lakɔmɑ̃d]; Occitan: La Comanda) is a commune in the Pyrénées-Atlantiques department in south-western France.

== Géography ==
Lacommande township is located some 11 km of Pau, 12,3 km of Oloron-Sainte-Marie and 8,8 km of Monein, on GR653, on crossroads of D 146 and D 34.

=== Hydrography ===
Rivers Baïse de Lasseube of Bayse flow from south to north and distinct the communes of Lacommande and commune of Aubertin. Its main tributaries flow the Lacommande territory from west to east named Seubemale stream, Brouqua stream, Bernatouse stream and the Coigdarrens stream who delimits the border with Monein.

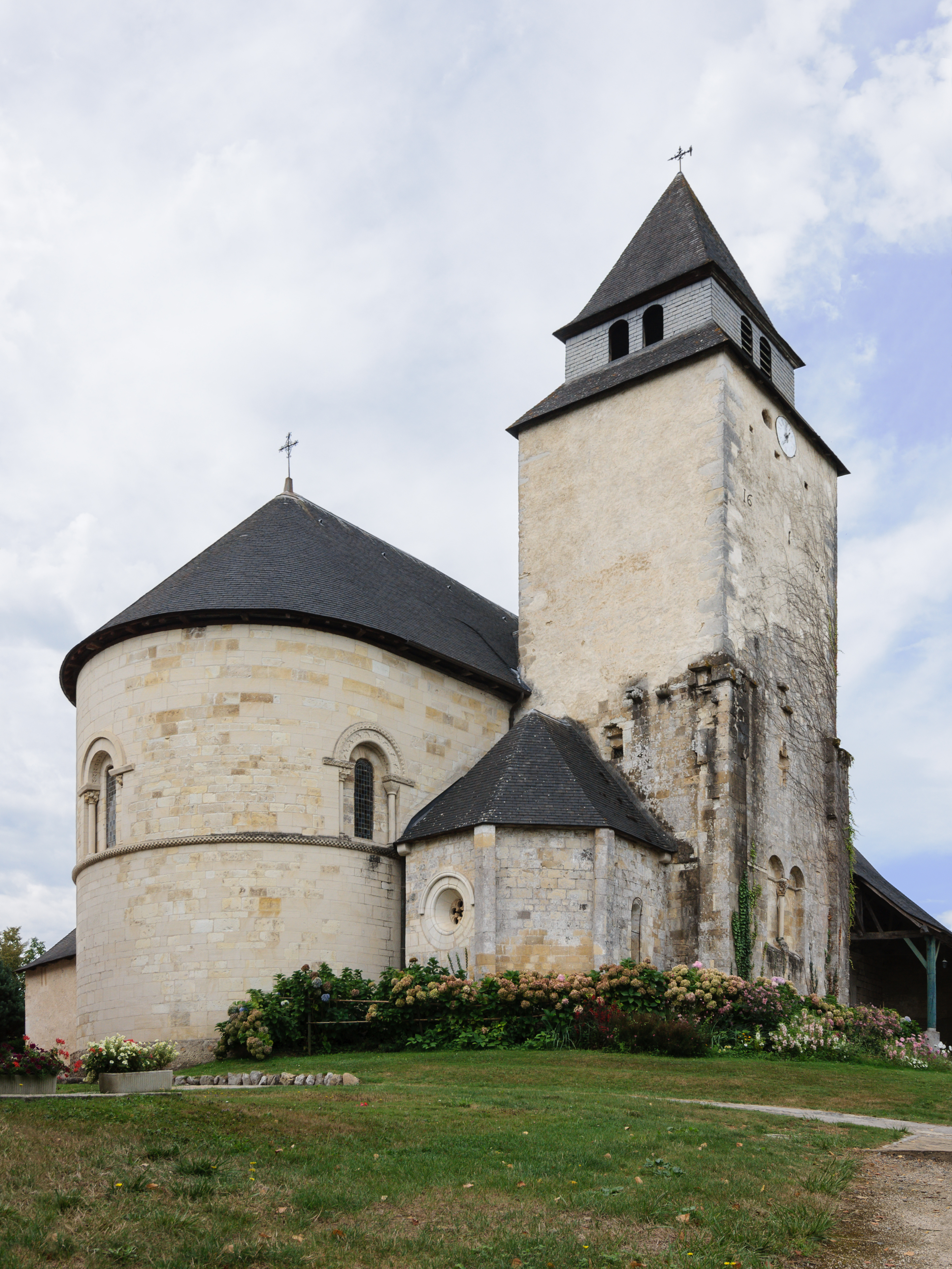
L'église Saint-Blaise, monument historique

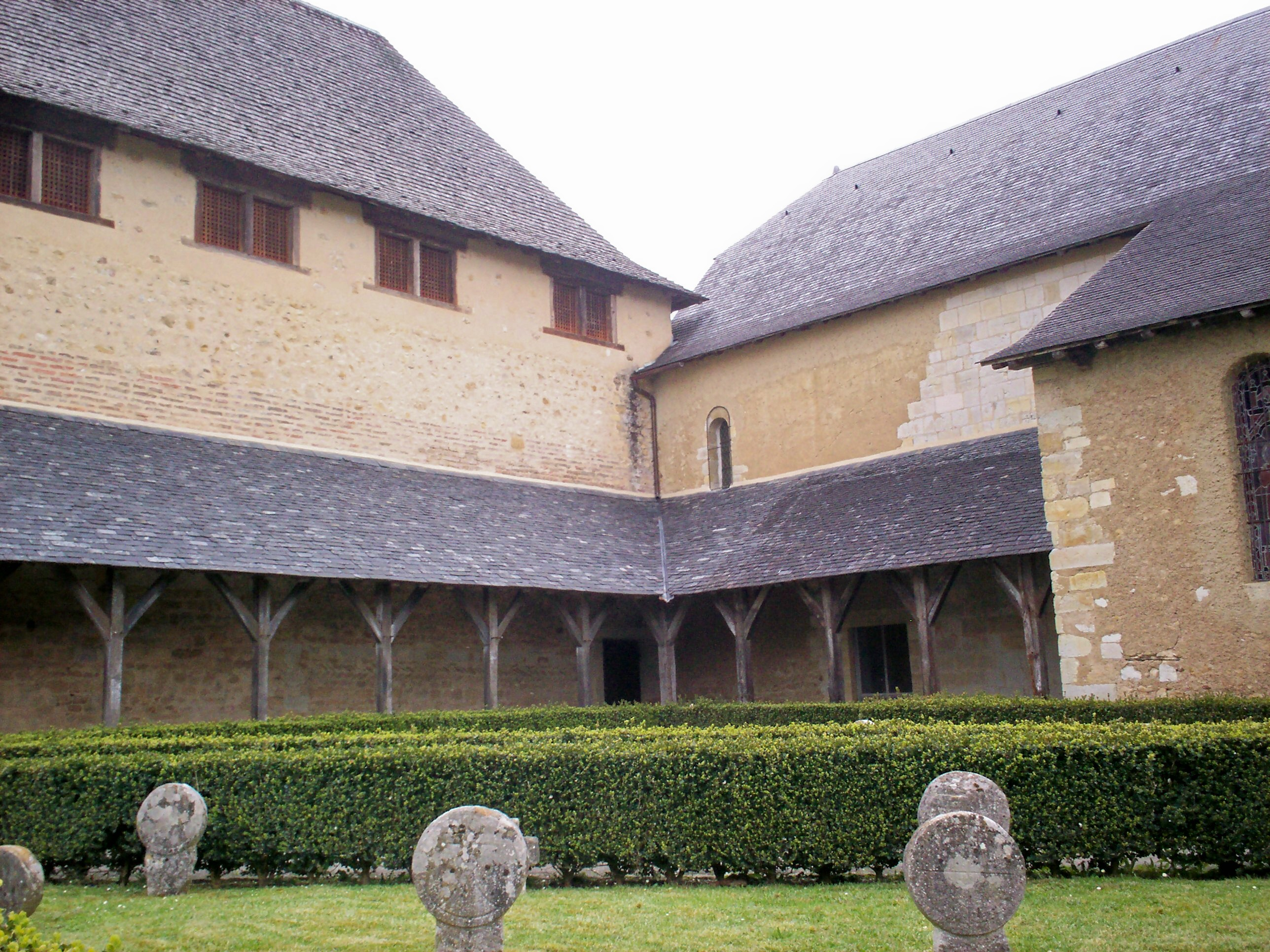
La Commanderie, monument historique

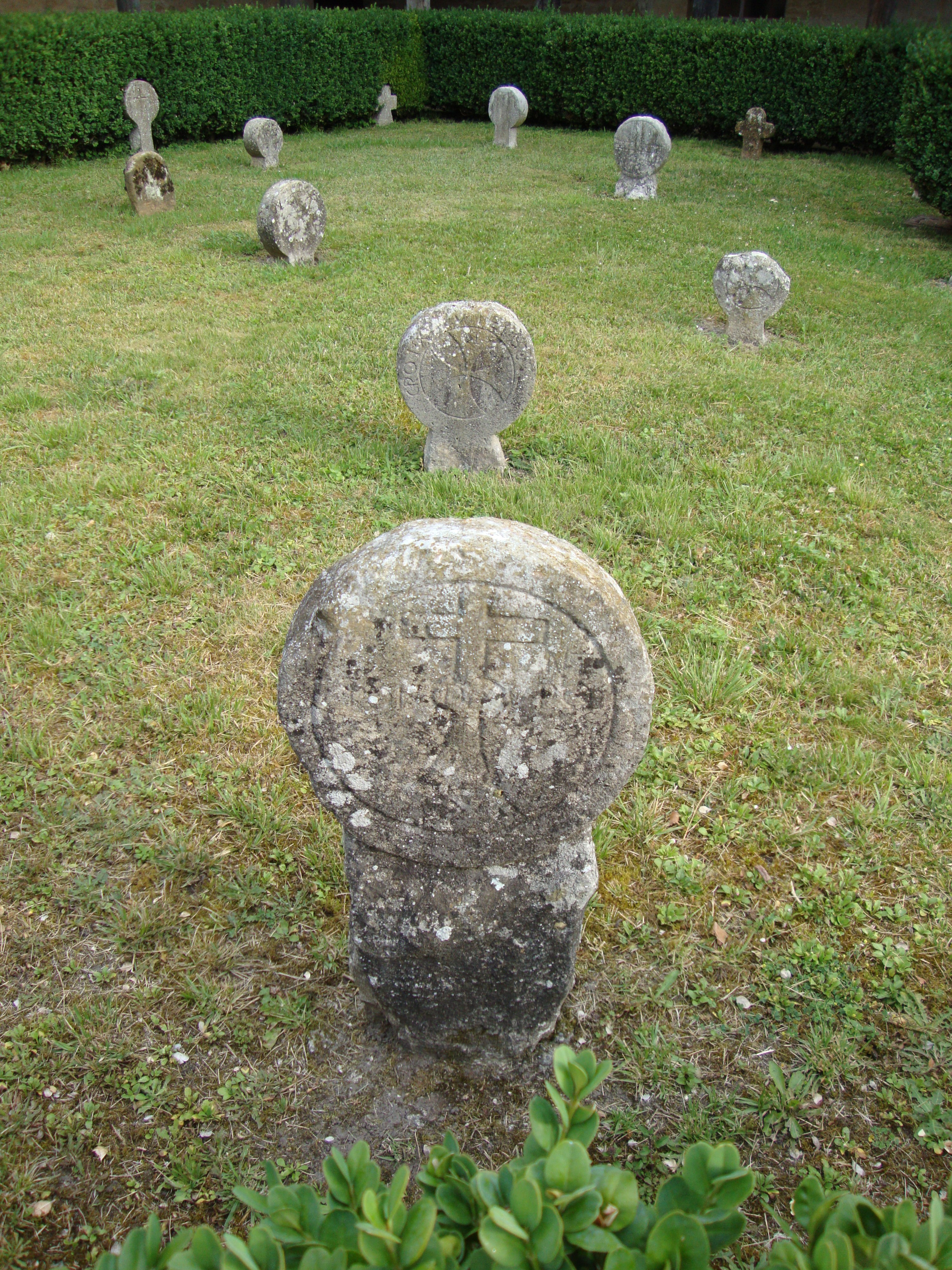

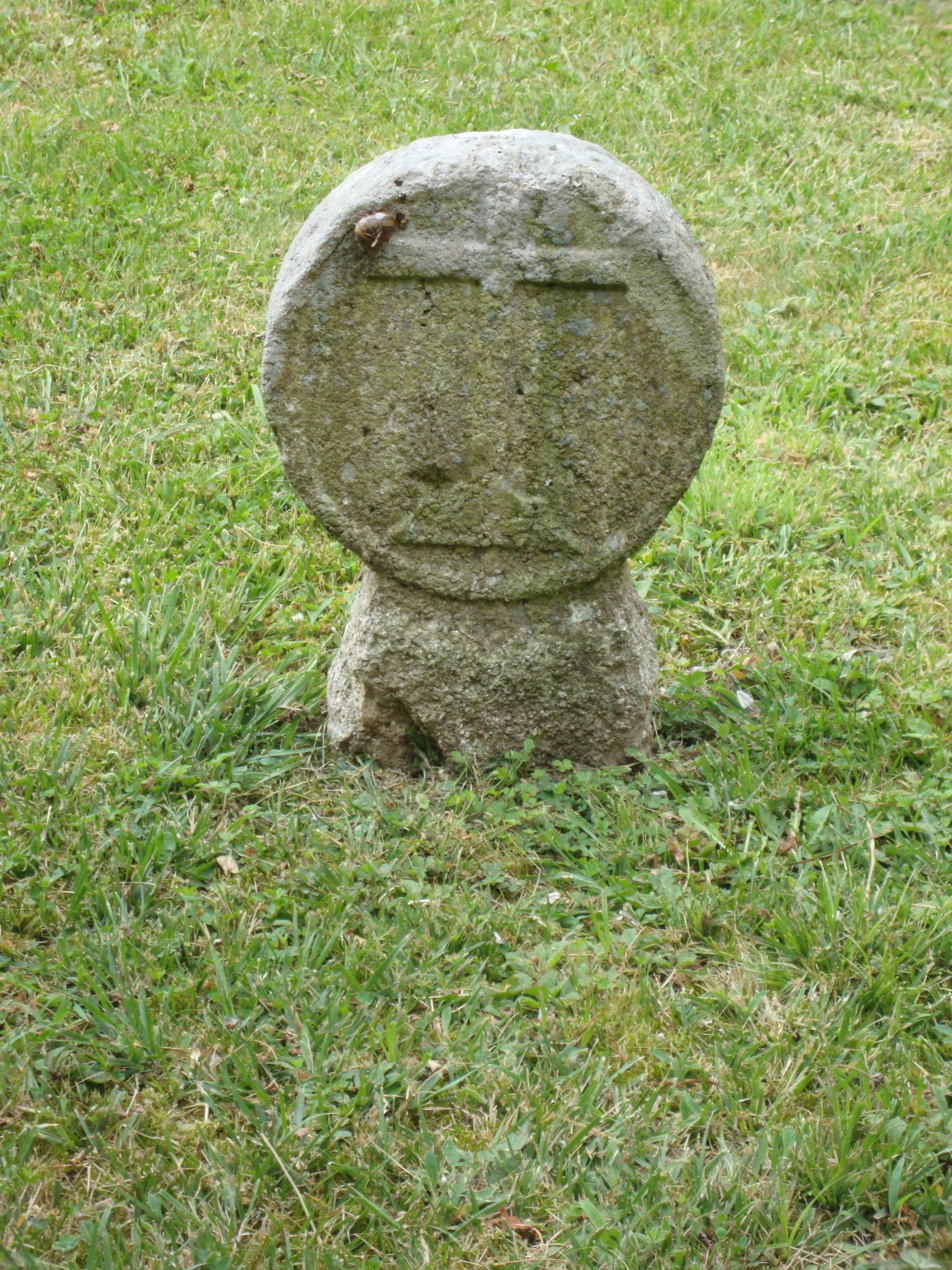

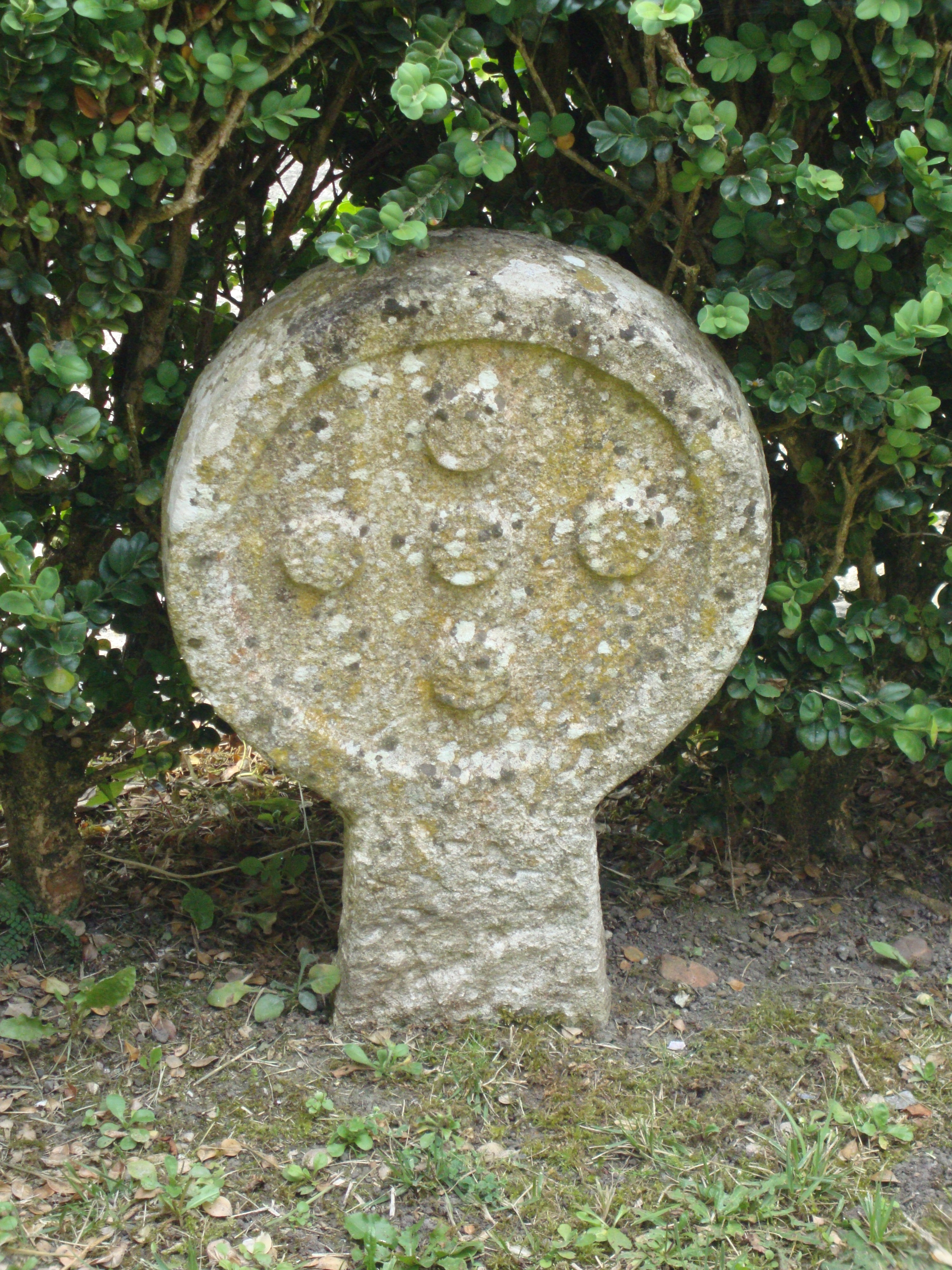

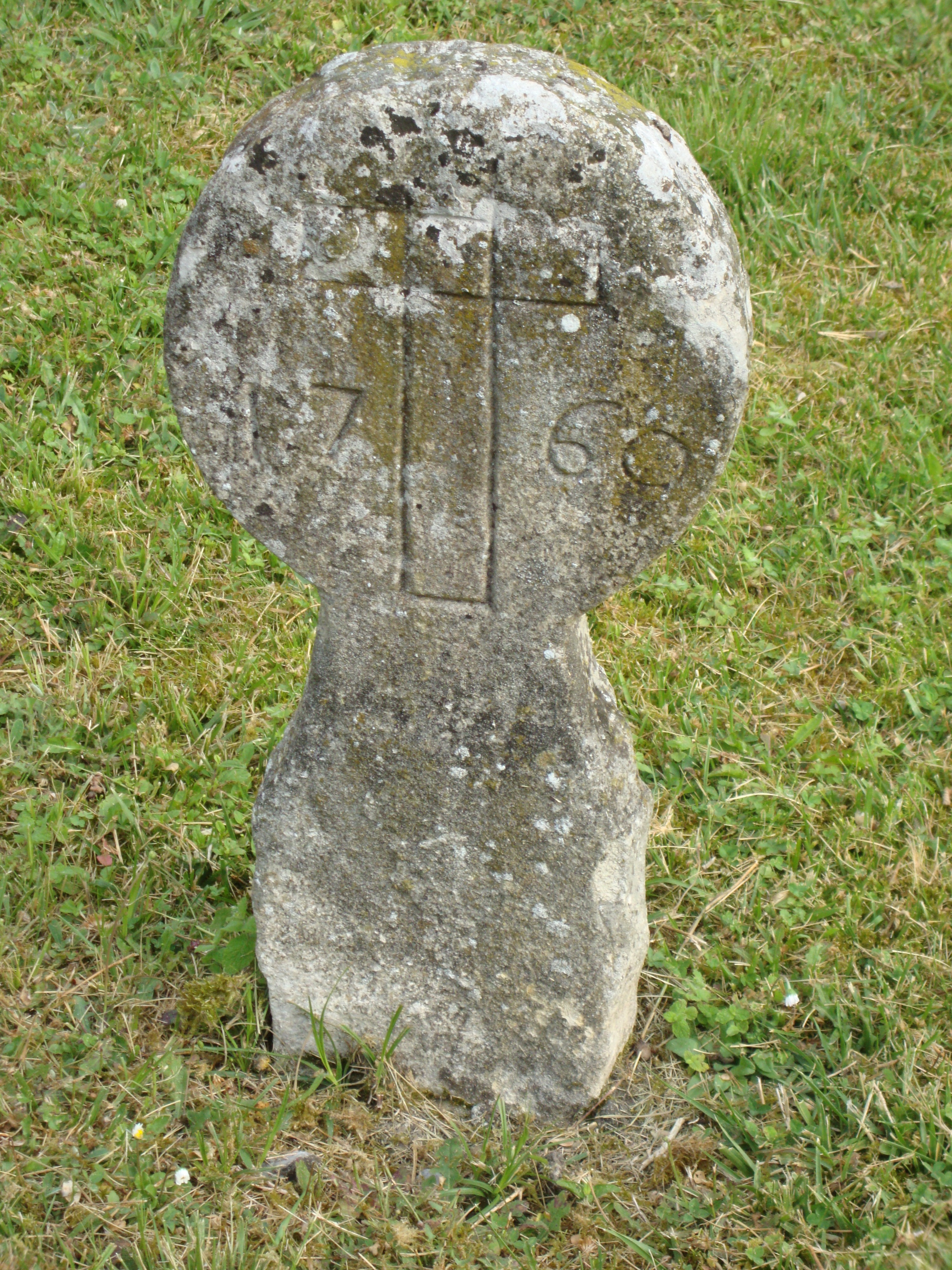

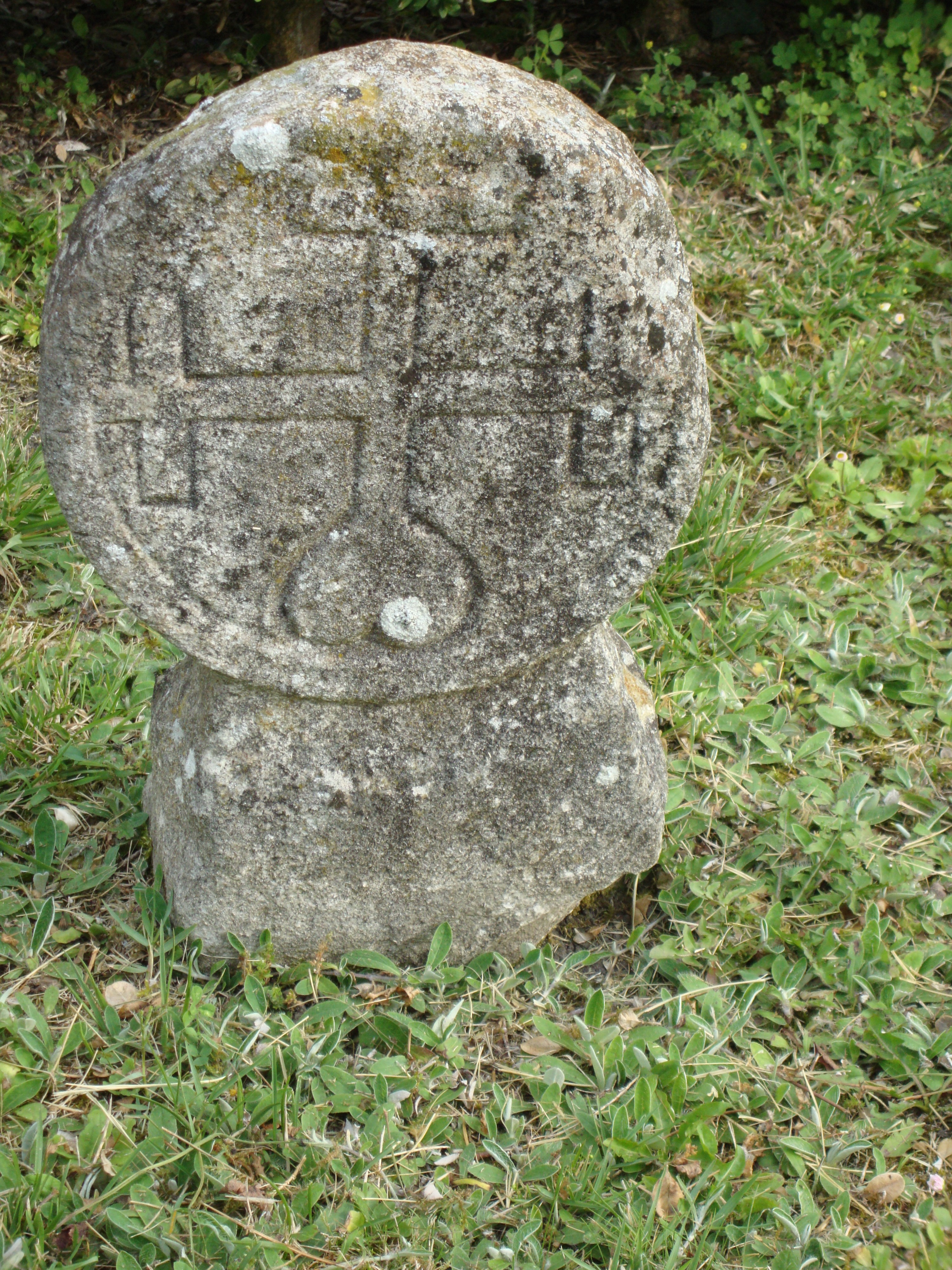

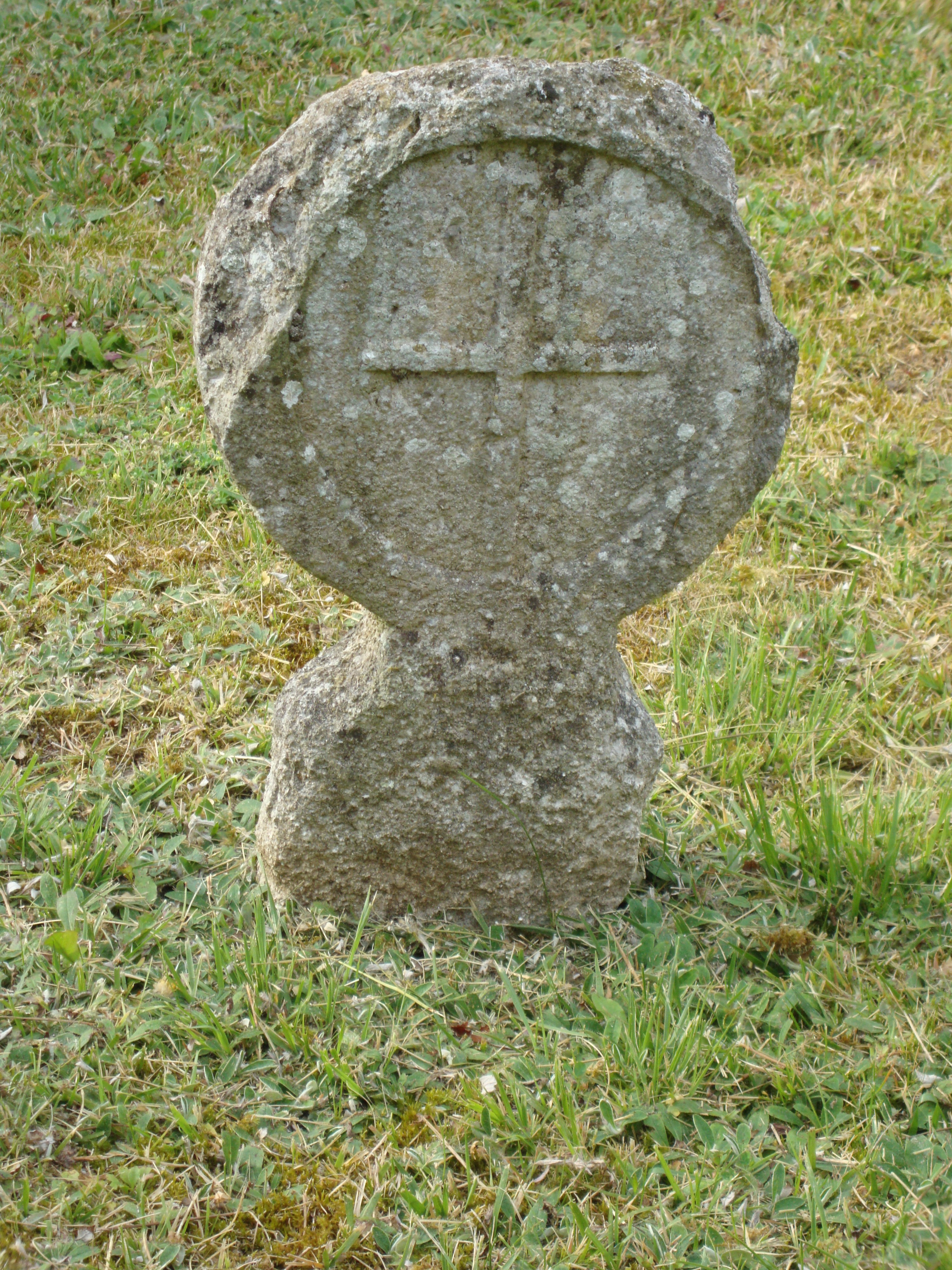

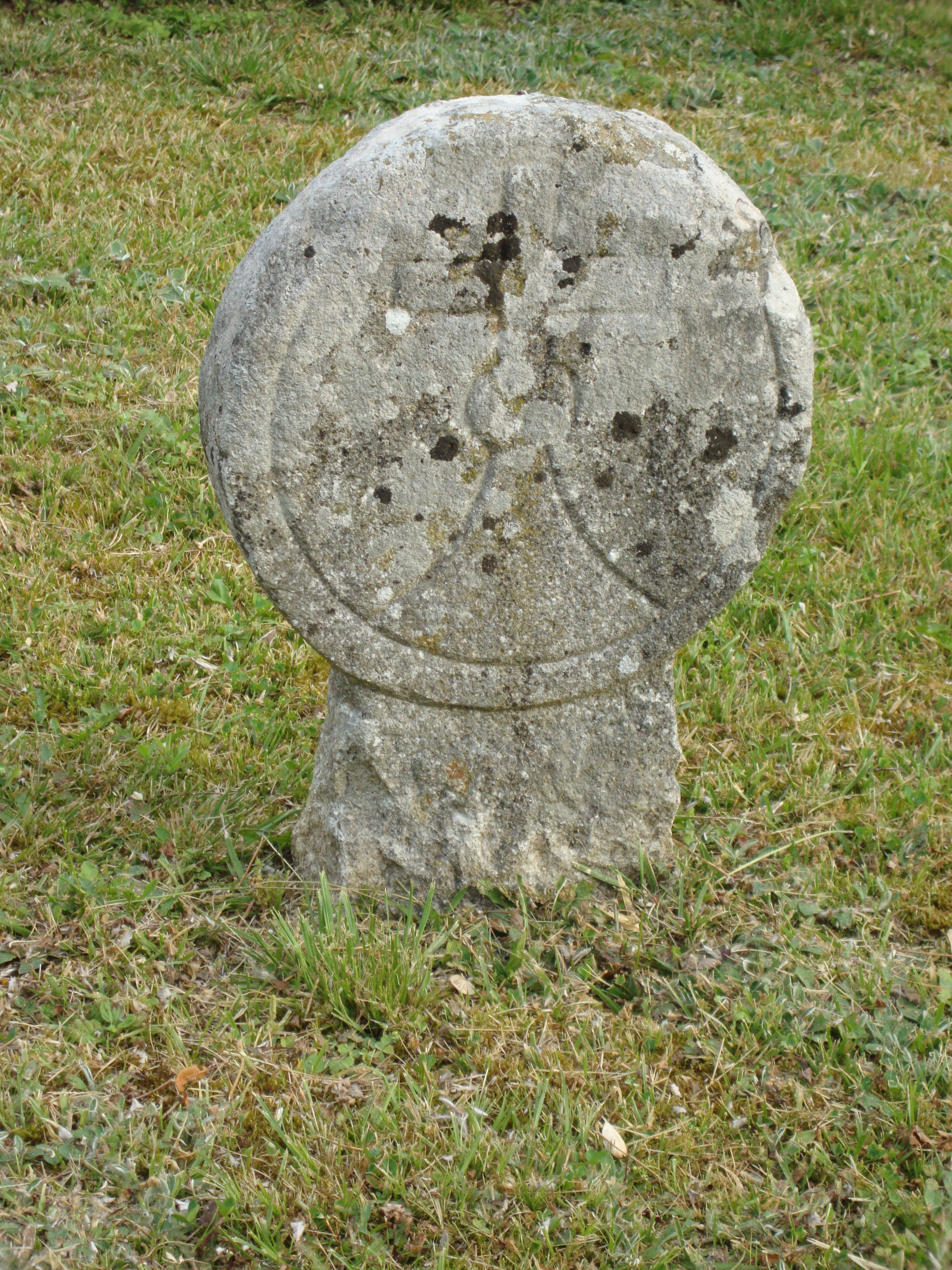

== See also ==
- Communes of the Pyrénées-Atlantiques department
