= Communauté d'agglomération Pau Béarn Pyrénées =

Coordinates: 43.312064°N 0.358772°W

Pau Béarn Pyrénées
- Communauté d'agglomération
- Location in the department of Pyrénées-Atlantiques
- Country: France
- Region: Nouvelle-Aquitaine
- Department: Pyrénées-Atlantiques
- No. of communes: {{{nbcomm}}}
- Established: 2017

Government
  - President (2020–2026): François Bayrou (MoDem)
- Area: 343.6 km^{2} (132.7 sq mi)
- Population (2018): 161,871
  - Density: 471.1/km^{2} (1,220/sq mi)

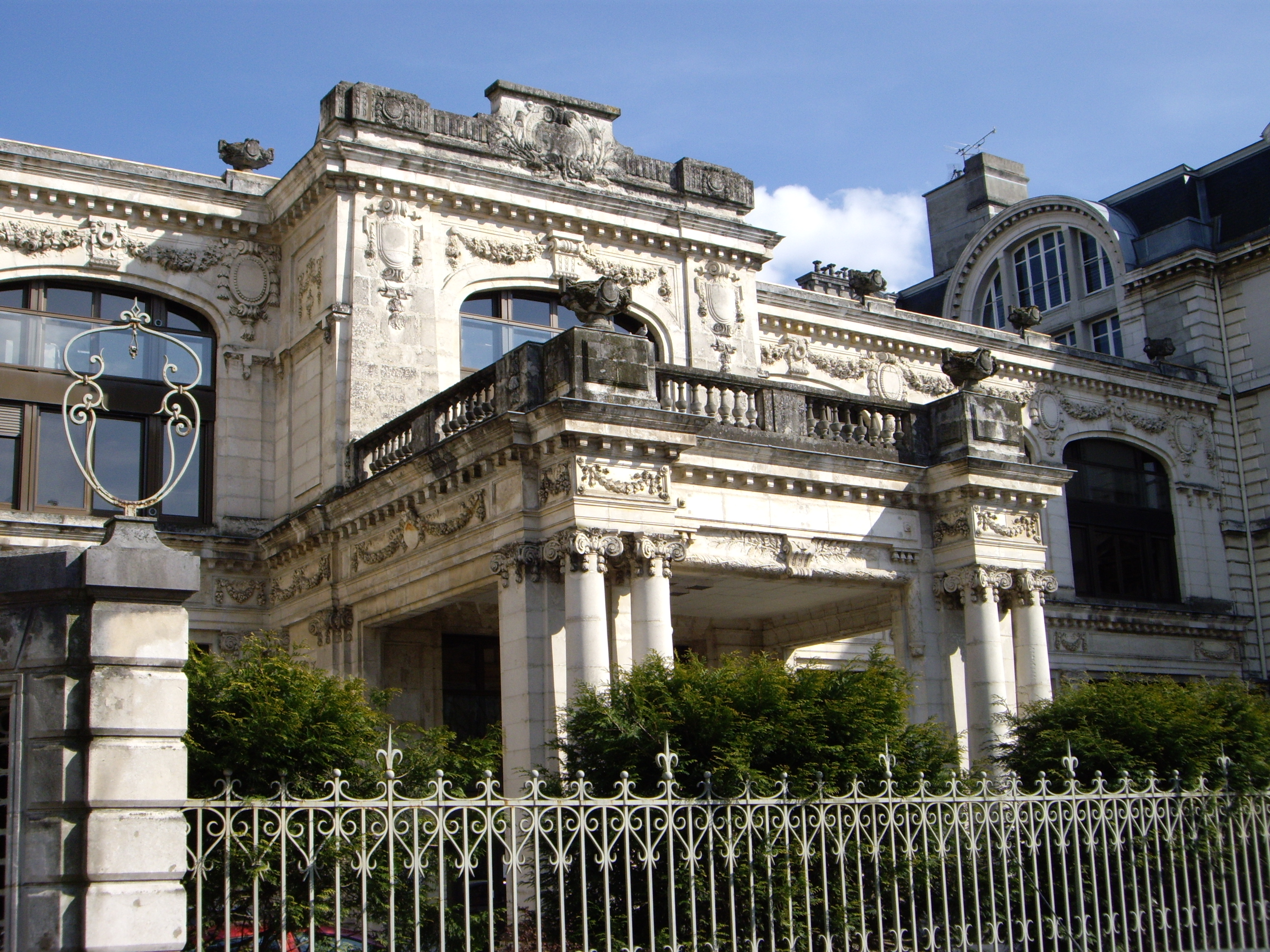
The Hôtel de France is the seat of the communauté.

The communauté d'agglomération Pau Béarn Pyrénées is an agglomeration community in the department of Pyrénées-Atlantiques, in the Nouvelle-Aquitaine region of France. It provides a framework within which local tasks common to the 31 member communes can be carried out together. It was created in 2017 by the merger of the former communauté d'agglomération Pau-Pyrénées and the communautés de communes Gave et Coteaux and Miey de Béarn. The communauté d'agglomération is centred on the town of Pau. Its area is 343.6 km^{2}. Its population was 161,871 in 2018, of which 76,275 in Pau proper.

== Communes ==
The communes of the communauté d'agglomération are:

1. Arbus
2. Aressy
3. Artigueloutan
4. Artiguelouve
5. Aubertin
6. Aussevielle
7. Beyrie-en-Béarn
8. Billère
9. Bizanos
10. Bosdarros
11. Bougarber
12. Denguin
13. Gan
14. Gelos
15. Idron
16. Jurançon
17. Laroin
18. Lée
19. Lescar
20. Lons
21. Mazères-Lezons
22. Meillon
23. Ousse
24. Pau
25. Poey-de-Lescar
26. Rontignon
27. Saint-Faust
28. Sendets
29. Siros
30. Uzein
31. Uzos
