= Bougarber =

- Commune
- Location of Bougarber
- Location within France Location within Nouvelle-Aquitaine
- Coordinates: 43°23′54″N 0°28′16″W
- Country: France
- Region: Nouvelle-Aquitaine
- Department: Pyrénées-Atlantiques
- Arrondissement: Pau
- Canton: Artix et Pays de Soubestre
- Intercommunality: CA Pau Béarn Pyrénées

Government
  - Mayor (2020–2026): Corinne Hau
- Area^{1}: 10.29 km^{2} (3.97 sq mi)
- Elevation: 165 m (541 ft)
- Highest elevation: 269 m (883 ft)
- Lowest elevation: 154 m (505 ft)
- Population (2023): 889
  - Density: 86.4/km^{2} (224/sq mi)
- Time zone: UTC+01:00 (CET)
  - Summer (DST): UTC+02:00 (CEST)
- INSEE/Postal code: 64142 /64230
- ^{1} French Land Register data, which excludes lakes, ponds, glaciers > 1 km^{2} (0.386 sq mi or 247 acres) and river estuaries.

Bougarber (French pronunciation: [buɡaʁbe]; Occitan: Borg Garbèr) is a commune in the Pyrénées-Atlantiques department in southwestern France.

== See also ==
- Communes of the Pyrénées-Atlantiques department
