= Mazères-Lezons =

- Commune
- Coat of arms
- Location of Mazères-Lezons
- Location within France Location within Nouvelle-Aquitaine
- Coordinates: 43°16′41″N 0°21′04″W
- Country: France
- Region: Nouvelle-Aquitaine
- Department: Pyrénées-Atlantiques
- Arrondissement: Pau
- Canton: Pau-3
- Intercommunality: CA Pau Béarn Pyrénées

Government
  - Mayor (2020–2026): Monique Semavoine
- Area^{1}: 4.00 km^{2} (1.54 sq mi)
- Highest elevation: 342 m (1,122 ft)
- Lowest elevation: 175 m (574 ft)
- Population (2023): 1,845
  - Density: 461/km^{2} (1,190/sq mi)
- Time zone: UTC+01:00 (CET)
  - Summer (DST): UTC+02:00 (CEST)
- INSEE/Postal code: 64373 /64110
- ^{1} French Land Register data, which excludes lakes, ponds, glaciers > 1 km^{2} (0.386 sq mi or 247 acres) and river estuaries.

Mazères-Lezons (French pronunciation: [mazɛʁ ləzɔ̃]; Occitan: Masèras e Leson) is a commune in the Pyrénées-Atlantiques department in south-western France.

== See also ==
- Communes of the Pyrénées-Atlantiques department
