= Aressy =

- Commune
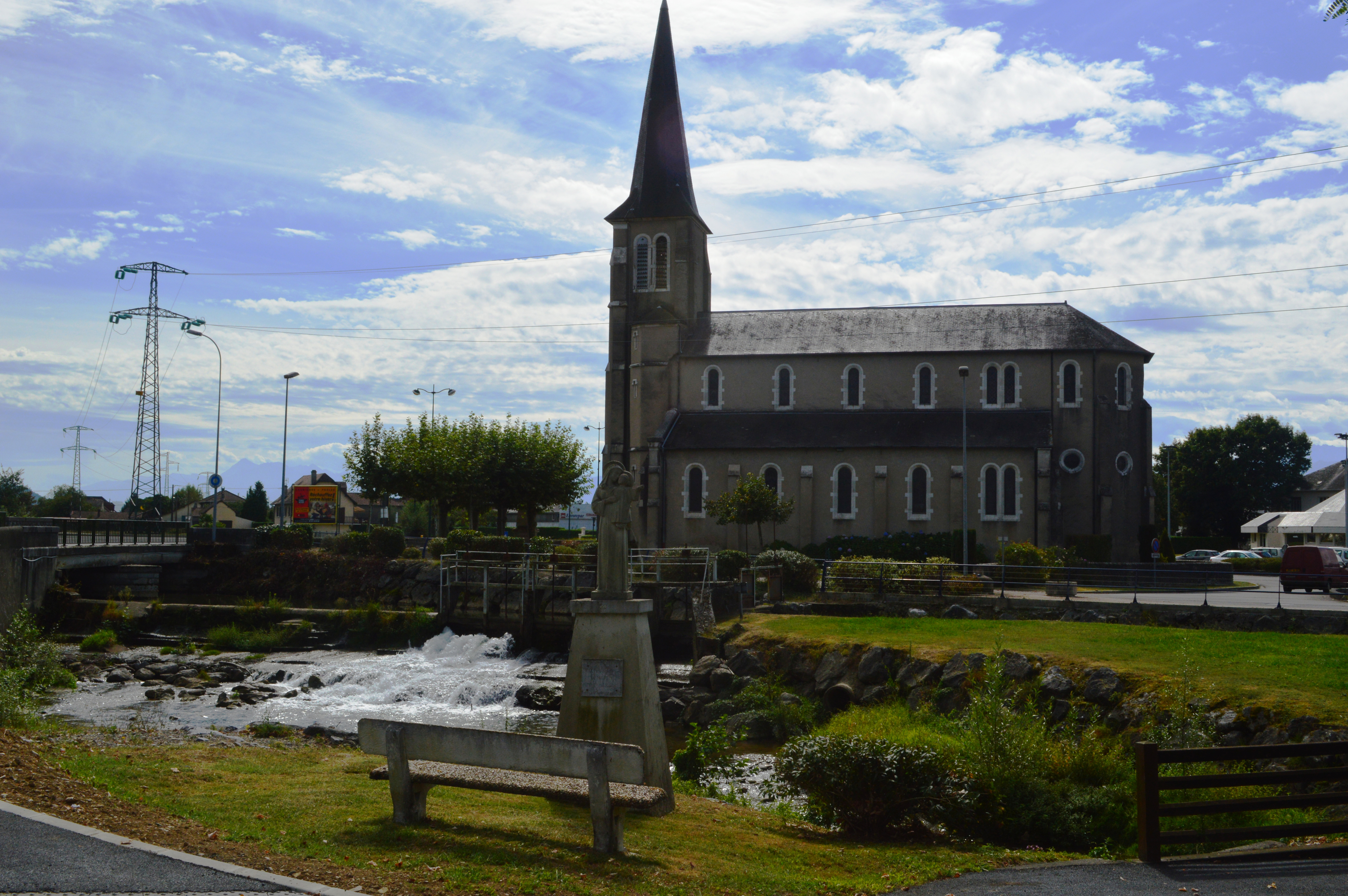
- The Lagoin river at the church
- Location of Aressy
- Location within France Location within Nouvelle-Aquitaine
- Coordinates: 43°16′38″N 0°19′23″W
- Country: France
- Region: Nouvelle-Aquitaine
- Department: Pyrénées-Atlantiques
- Arrondissement: Pau
- Canton: Ouzom, Gave et Rives du Neez
- Intercommunality: CA Pau Béarn Pyrénées

Government
  - Mayor (2020–2026): Claude Ferrato
- Area^{1}: 2.15 km^{2} (0.83 sq mi)
- Elevation: 241 m (791 ft)
- Highest elevation: 244 m (801 ft)
- Lowest elevation: 179 m (587 ft)
- Population (2023): 881
  - Density: 410/km^{2} (1,060/sq mi)
- Time zone: UTC+01:00 (CET)
  - Summer (DST): UTC+02:00 (CEST)
- INSEE/Postal code: 64041 /64320
- ^{1} French Land Register data, which excludes lakes, ponds, glaciers > 1 km^{2} (0.386 sq mi or 247 acres) and river estuaries.

Aressy (French pronunciation: [aʁɛsi]; Occitan: Arèssi) is a commune in the Pyrénées-Atlantiques department in the Nouvelle-Aquitaine region of south-western France. It is part of the urban area (unité urbaine) of Pau.

== Geography ==
Aressy is located four kilometres south-east of Pau within the urban area of Pau. Access to the commune is by the D937 road from Pau which continues south-east to Meillon.

The Idelis bus route P23 stops at Aressy Clinic at Pôle Bosquet. The commune is also served by Route 835 of the Interurban network of Pyrénées-Atlantiques (Transports 64) between Bénéjacq and Pau, and by Route 805 between Lourdes and Pau.

Much of the commune is residential with some farmland and a large lake in the south.

The Gave de Pau flows north-west through the western part of the commune, and the Lagoin flows through the centre of the commune before joining the Gave de Pau just north-west of the commune.

=== Places and Hamlets ===
- Las Costes
- Labielle
- Marque
- Matachot
- Le Saligat

== Toponymy ==
Its name in Bearnais is Aressi (according to the classical norm of Occitan).

Brigitte Jobbé-Duval indicates that the place name could come from the Basque, meaning "place where there are rocks" which would confirm the hypothesis by Michel Grosclaude of ar- ("stone or rock") with the Basque locative suffix -etz transformed into -esse.

The following table details the origins of the commune name and other names in the commune.

Name	Spelling	Date	Source	Page	Origin	Description
Aressy	Aressa	1010	Jobbé			Village
	Aressa	1101	Raymond	9	Lescar	
	Aresi	12th century	Raymond	9	Lescar	
	Arecii	1376	Raymond	9	Military	
	Eressi	1385	Raymond	9	Census	
	Arecii	1538	Raymond	9	Reformation	
	Arressii	1546	Raymond	9	Reformation	
	Aressy	1750	Cassini			
	Arressy	1793	Ldh/EHESS/Cassini			
Le Junca	Le Junca	1863	Raymond	86		Place
Les Pelades	Les Pelades	1863	Raymond	133		Place
Le Saliga	Le Saliga	1863	Raymond	133		Moor
Le Tuquet	Le Tuquet	1863	Raymond	169		Wood

Sources:

- Jobbé: Brigitte Jobbé-Duval, Dictionary of place names - Pyrénées-Atlantiques
- Raymond: Topographic Dictionary of the Department of Basses-Pyrenees, 1863, on the page numbers indicated in the table. (in French)
- Grosclaude: Toponymic Dictionary of communes, Béarn, 2006 (in French)
- Cassini: Cassini Map from 1750
- Ldh/EHESS/Cassini: Des villages de Cassini aux communes d'aujourd'hui: Commune data sheet Aressy, EHESS (in French).

Origins:

- Lescar: Cartulary of Lescar
- Military: Military Inspection of Béarn
- Census: Census of Béarn
- Reformation: Reformation of Béarn

== History ==
Paul Raymond noted on page 9 of his dictionary that the commune had a Lay Abbey, vassal of the Viscounts of Béarn. In 1385, Aressy had nine fires and depended on the bailiwick of Pau.

== Administration ==
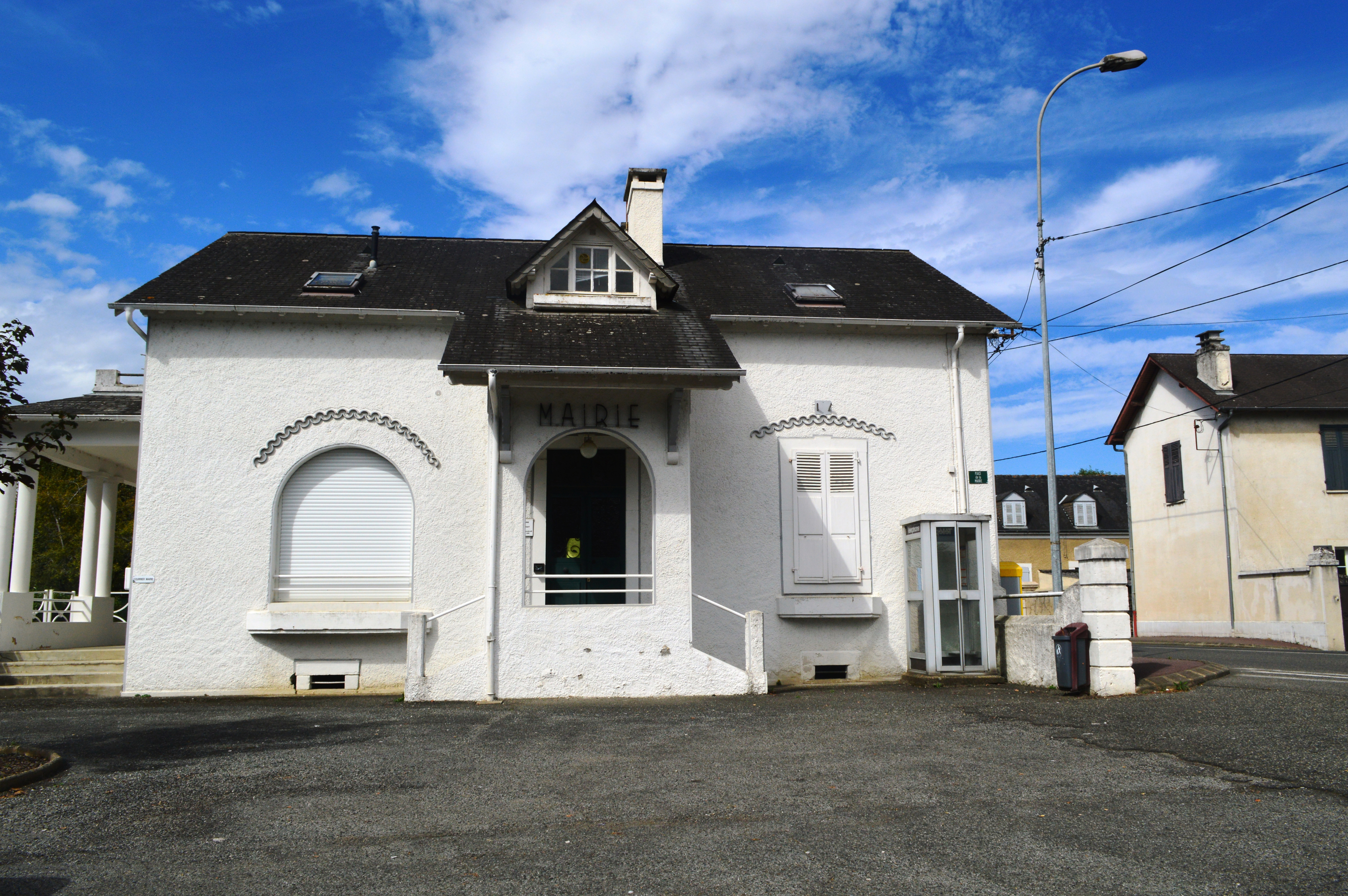
The Town Hall

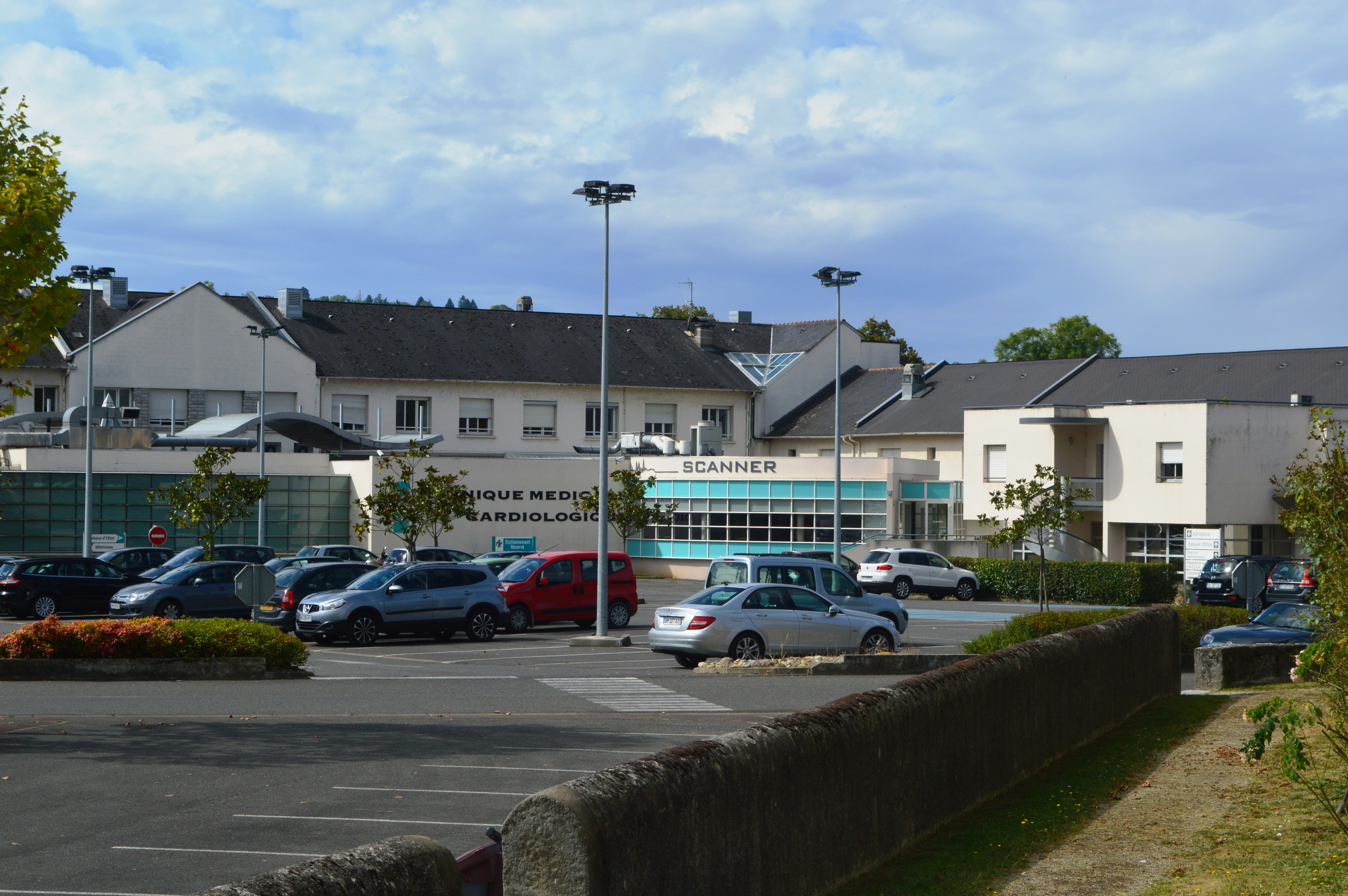
Aressy Medical Centre

List of Successive Mayors

From	To	Name	Party
1995	2001	Monique Lanusse-Cazalé	
2001	2026	Claude Ferrato	MoDem

=== Inter-communality ===
Aressy is part of nine inter-communal structures:

- the Public agency of local management;
- the Communauté d'agglomération Pau Béarn Pyrénées;
- the AEP association for the Jurançon region;
- the defense against floods association for the Lagoin catchment area;
- the energy association of Pyrénées-Atlantiques;
- the inter-communal association for the Narcastet leisure centre;
- the inter-communal association for defense against flooding of the Gave de Pau;
- the inter-communal association for the construction and operation of the CES of Bizanos;
- the Joint association for urban transport Pau - Porte des Pyrenees

== Demography ==
The inhabitants of the commune are known as Arésyiens or Arésyiennes in French.

Historical population

Year	Pop.	±% p.a.
1793	480	—
1821	230	−2.59%
1846	314	+1.25%
1872	360	+0.53%
1901	346	−0.14%
1926	357	+0.13%
1946	416	+0.77%
1962	399	−0.26%
1968	476	+2.98%

Year	Pop.	±% p.a.
1975	601	+3.39%
1982	578	−0.56%
1990	546	−0.71%
1999	543	−0.06%
2007	571	+0.63%
2012	638	+2.24%
2017	712	+2.22%
2023	881	+3.61%

Source: EHESS and INSEE

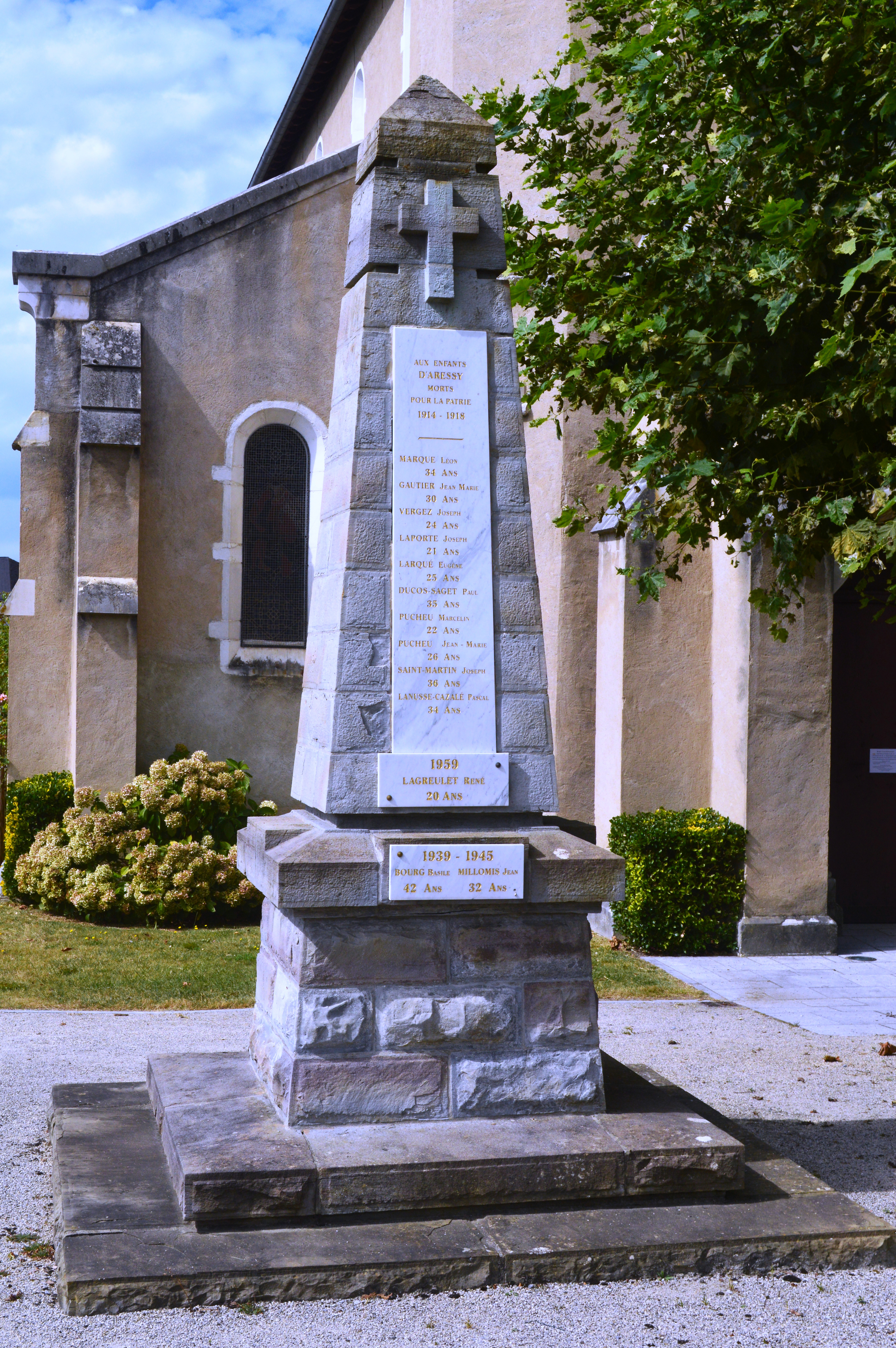
Aressy War Memoprial

== Economy ==
The commune is part of the Appellation d'origine contrôlée (AOC) zone designation of Ossau-iraty.

== Culture and Heritage ==
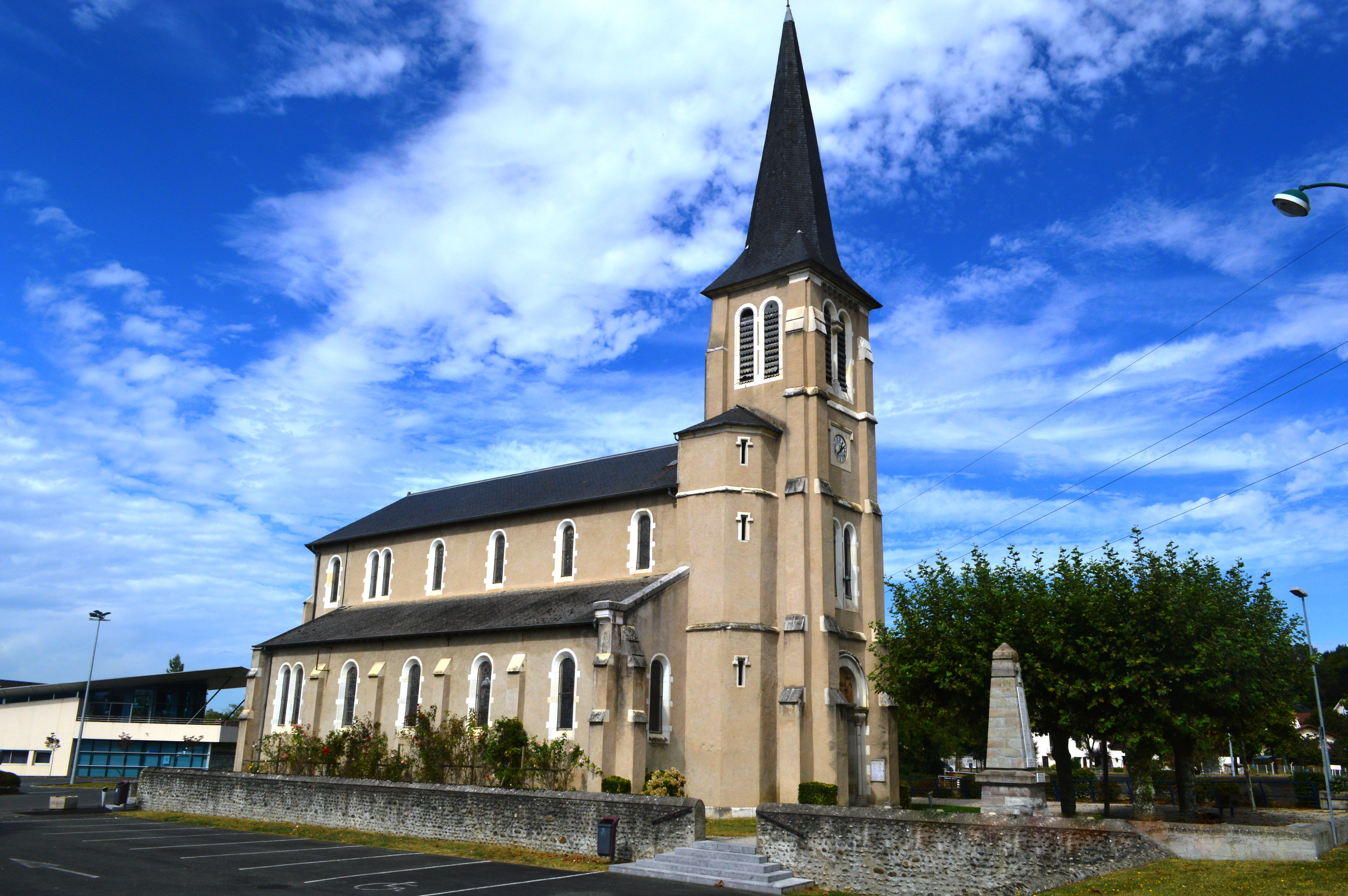
The Church of Saint Denys

=== Religious heritage ===
The Parish Church of Saint Denys (1874) is registered as an historical monument.

== See also ==
- Communes of the Pyrénées-Atlantiques department
