= Beyrie-en-Béarn =

- Commune
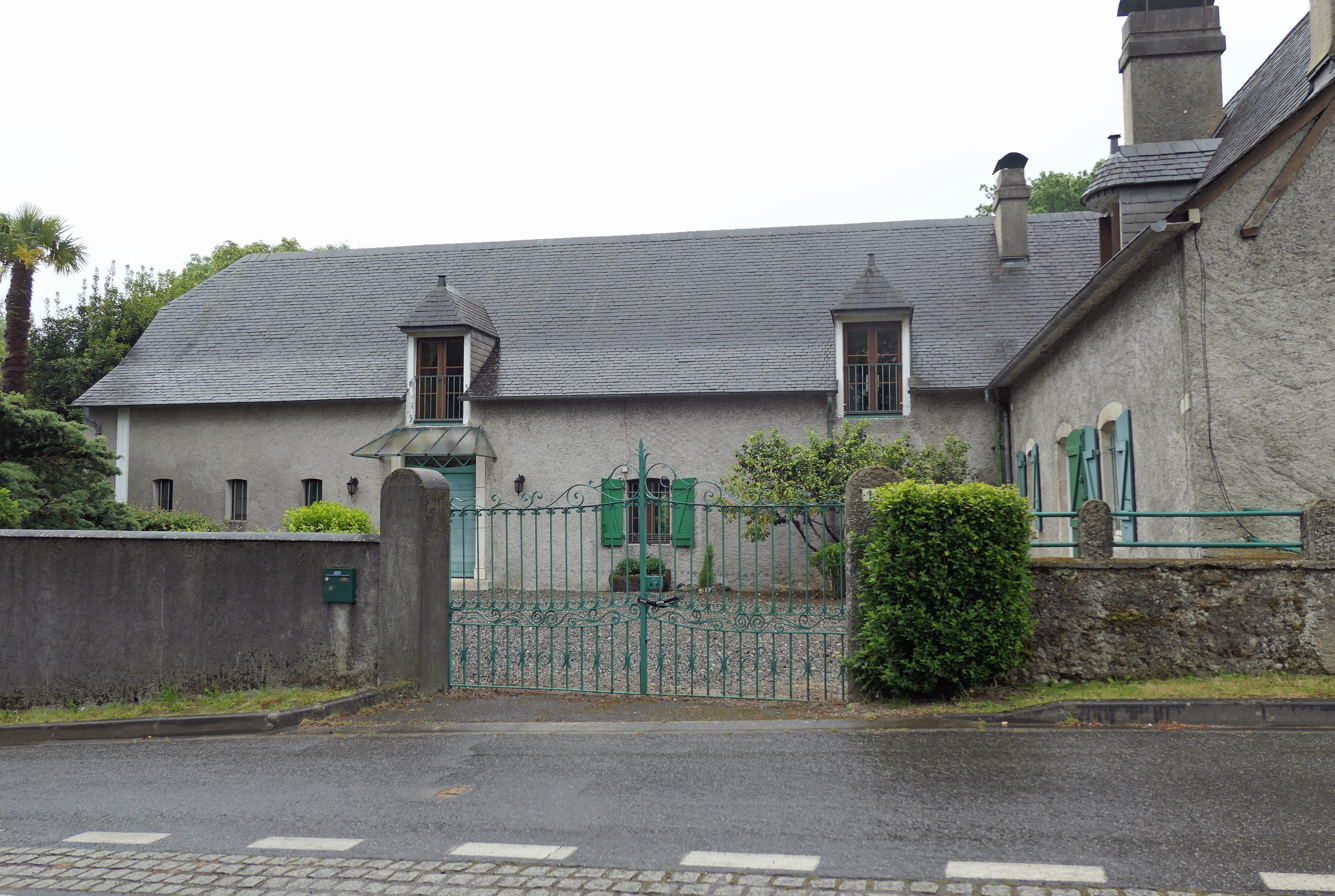
- Beyrie-en-Béarn Town hall
- Location of Beyrie-en-Béarn
- Location within France Location within Nouvelle-Aquitaine
- Coordinates: 43°22′24″N 0°28′13″W
- Country: France
- Region: Nouvelle-Aquitaine
- Department: Pyrénées-Atlantiques
- Arrondissement: Pau
- Canton: Artix et Pays de Soubestre
- Intercommunality: CA Pau Béarn Pyrénées

Government
  - Mayor (2020–2026): Philippe Faure
- Area^{1}: 2.72 km^{2} (1.05 sq mi)
- Elevation: 178 m (584 ft)
- Highest elevation: 245 m (804 ft)
- Lowest elevation: 167 m (548 ft)
- Population (2023): 197
  - Density: 72.4/km^{2} (188/sq mi)
- Time zone: UTC+01:00 (CET)
  - Summer (DST): UTC+02:00 (CEST)
- INSEE/Postal code: 64121 /64230
- ^{1} French Land Register data, which excludes lakes, ponds, glaciers > 1 km^{2} (0.386 sq mi or 247 acres) and river estuaries.

Beyrie-en-Béarn (French pronunciation: [beʁi ɑ̃ beaʁn], literally Beyrie in Béarn; Occitan: Veiria) is a commune of the Pyrénées-Atlantiques department in southwestern France.

== See also ==
- Communes of the Pyrénées-Atlantiques department
