= Meillon =

- Commune
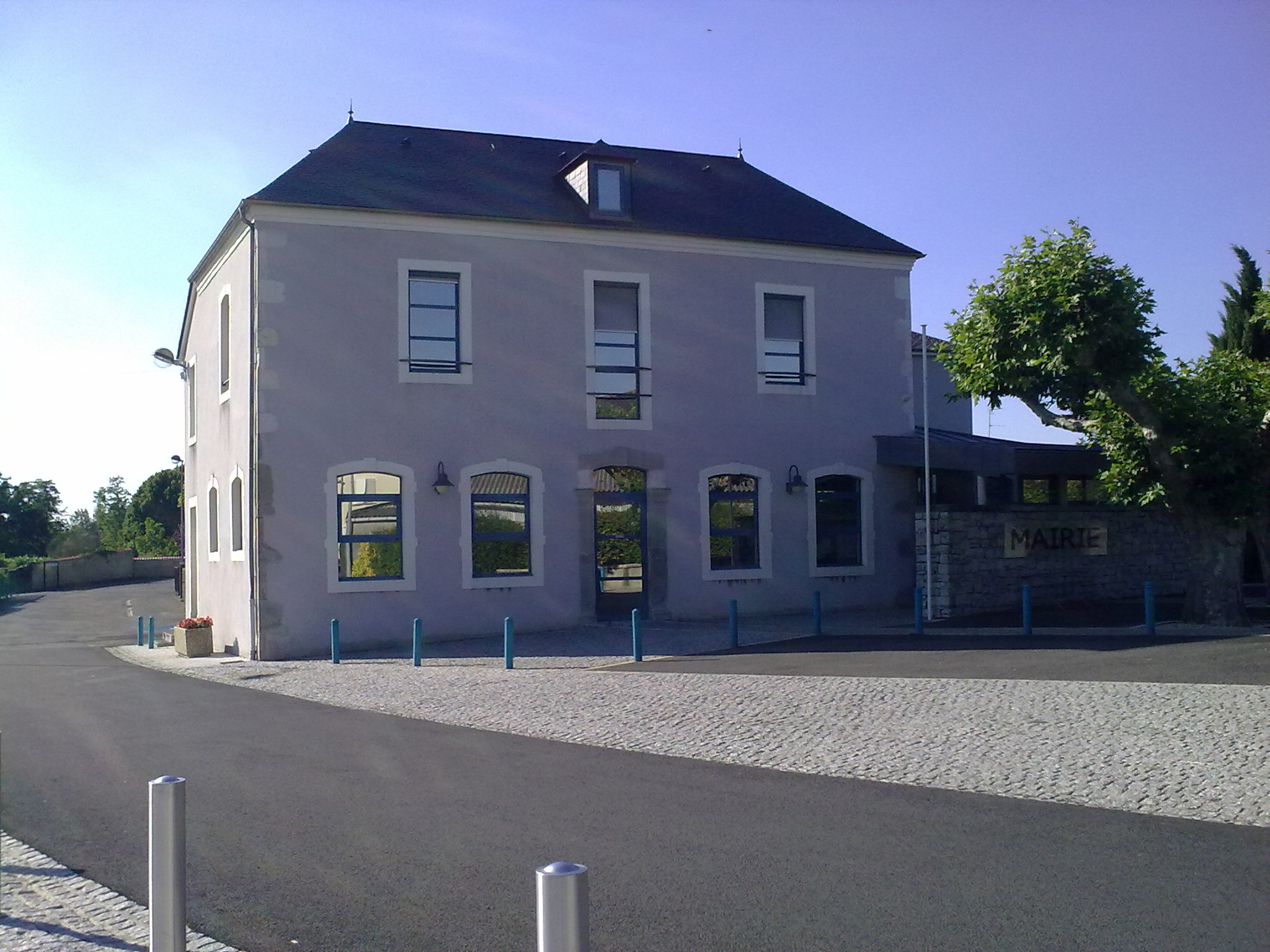
- Town Hall
- Location of Meillon
- Location within France Location within Nouvelle-Aquitaine
- Coordinates: 43°15′56″N 0°18′45″W
- Country: France
- Region: Nouvelle-Aquitaine
- Department: Pyrénées-Atlantiques
- Arrondissement: Pau
- Canton: Ouzom, Gave et Rives du Neez
- Intercommunality: CA Pau Béarn Pyrénées

Government
  - Mayor (2020–2026): Patrick Buron
- Area^{1}: 7.08 km^{2} (2.73 sq mi)
- Elevation: 200 m (660 ft)
- Highest elevation: 260 m (850 ft)
- Lowest elevation: 186 m (610 ft)
- Population (2023): 957
  - Density: 135/km^{2} (350/sq mi)
- Time zone: UTC+01:00 (CET)
  - Summer (DST): UTC+02:00 (CEST)
- INSEE/Postal code: 64376 /64510
- ^{1} French Land Register data, which excludes lakes, ponds, glaciers > 1 km^{2} (0.386 sq mi or 247 acres) and river estuaries.

Meillon (French pronunciation: [mɛjɔ̃]; Occitan: Melhon) is a commune in the Pyrénées-Atlantiques department in south-western France.

== See also ==
- Communes of the Pyrénées-Atlantiques department
