= Siros, Pyrénées-Atlantiques =

Siros
- Commune
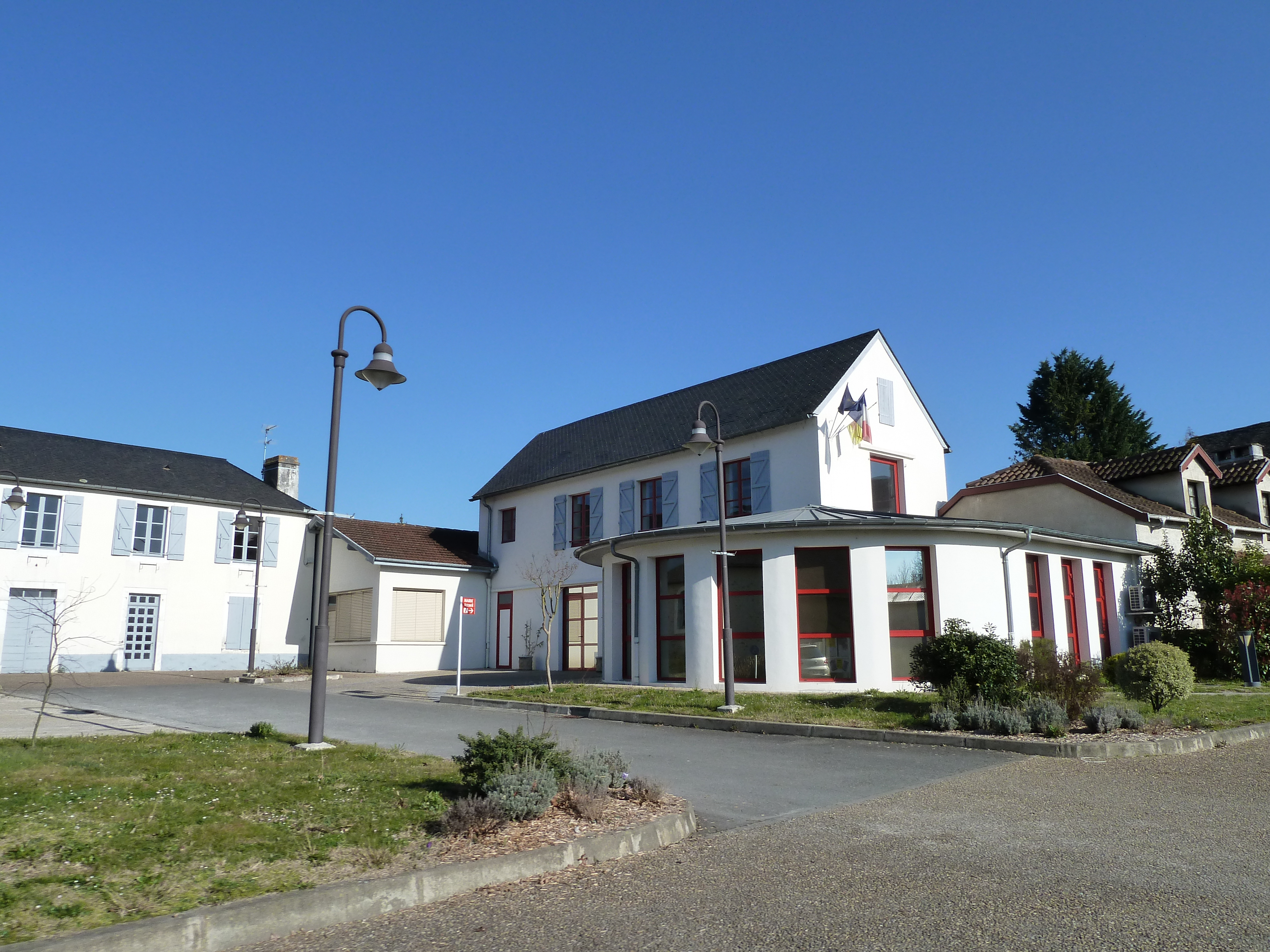
- The town hall of Siros
- Location of Siros
- Location within France Location within Nouvelle-Aquitaine
- Coordinates: 43°20′42″N 0°28′56″W
- Country: France
- Region: Nouvelle-Aquitaine
- Department: Pyrénées-Atlantiques
- Arrondissement: Pau
- Canton: Lescar, Gave et Terres du Pont-Long
- Intercommunality: CA Pau Béarn Pyrénées

Government
  - Mayor (2020–2026): Christophe Pando
- Area^{1}: 2.21 km^{2} (0.85 sq mi)
- Elevation: 152 m (499 ft)
- Highest elevation: 143 m (469 ft)
- Lowest elevation: 128 m (420 ft)
- Population (2023): 848
  - Density: 384/km^{2} (994/sq mi)
- Time zone: UTC+01:00 (CET)
  - Summer (DST): UTC+02:00 (CEST)
- INSEE/Postal code: 64525 /64230
- ^{1} French Land Register data, which excludes lakes, ponds, glaciers > 1 km^{2} (0.386 sq mi or 247 acres) and river estuaries.

Siros (French pronunciation: [siʁɔs]; Occitan: Siròs) is a commune in the Pyrénées-Atlantiques department in south-western France.

== See also ==
- Communes of the Pyrénées-Atlantiques department
