= Robert Péré-Escamps =

French football player and manager (born 1956)

Personal information
- Date of birth: 16 March 1956 (age 70)
- Place of birth: Pau, France
- Height: 5 ft 6 in (1.68 m)
- Position: Midfielder

Youth career
- –1975: Vaillante de Gelos

Senior career*
Years	Team	Apps	(Gls)
1975–1988	Pau FC	289	(31)

Managerial career
- 1990–1991: Pau FC (interim, with Marc Lévy)
- 1995–1996: Pau FC
- * Club domestic league appearances and goals

Robert Péré-Escamps (born 16 March 1956) is a French football manager and former player. He played as a midfielder for Pau FC, where he also served as captain, interim manager, head coach, and youth academy educator.

== Biography ==
=== Early life ===
Péré-Escamps was born in Pau, France. He began his football career at Vaillante de Gelos, before joining Pau FC in 1975 at the age of 19.

=== Playing career ===
Péré-Escamps made his debut for Pau FC in 1975, while the club competed in the Championnat de France Amateur. Primarily a defensive midfielder, he stood 1.68 m tall and became captain in 1983, succeeding Albert Clède.

Under president Pierre Clède (1975–1991), Péré-Escamps became a key player, helping Pau gain promotion to Division 3 in 1983 alongside Joël Lopez and goalkeeper Bernard Laporte-Fray. He captained the team throughout the 1980s, appearing in over 300 matches, making him one of the club’s most-capped players alongside Jacques Leglib, Julien Labat, and Nicolas Cami.

At the start of the 1983–84 season, under the guidance of manager Paul Escudé, Pau FC finally returned to Division 3. The squad included notable players such as Bernard Laporte-Fray and Joël Lopez. The club's resurgence generated growing interest, with over 8,000 spectators attending the first leg of the 32nd round of the Coupe de France at stade de la Croix du Prince.

During the 1984–85 season, Pau narrowly missed promotion to Ligue 2, finishing behind Chamois niortais, despite the return of Dominique Vésir. The following year, the club reached the round of 16 of the Coupe de France, facing AS Nancy-Lorraine managed by Arsène Wenger. The match, lost 1–0, drew over 10,000 spectators at Stade de la Croix du Prince.

=== Coaching career ===
==== Interim management (1990–1991) ====
In February 1990, following the departure of Paul Escudé, Péré-Escamps was appointed interim manager of Pau FC in Division 3, jointly with Marc Lévy. During the 1990–91 season, Pau narrowly avoided relegation, thanks to a late penalty by Joël Lopez. Péré-Escamps was succeeded by Jean Gallice at the end of the season.

==== First manager of Pau FC (1995–1996) ====
Following the judicial liquidation of FC Pau in 1995, the club was refounded as Pau Football Club under Bernard Laporte-Fray, a former player from the 1982–83 promotion season.

The club officially reformed on 14 June 1995, adopting Pau’s yellow and blue colours. Péré-Escamps, as a former captain, was appointed head coach for the 1995–96 season in Championnat National 2. He restructured the squad and reduced the payroll by more than 50%. He led the team to a stable season, including a 1–0 victory over Dijon FCO in the opening match at Stade du Hameau. He stepped down at season’s end but continued to work in youth and regional football development.

==== Youth development and regional involvement ====
Péré-Escamps has worked extensively in Pau FC's youth academy, focusing on players from U6 to U13. In 2006, he became sporting director of Pau FC's amateur section. He has served on the executive board of the District de Football des Pyrénées-Atlantiques, representing youth educators and chairing the surveillance commission.

He then coached his boyhood club Gelos.
