= David Vignes =

French football manager (born 1973)

Personal information
- Date of birth: 21 June 1973 (age 53)
- Place of birth: Lons, France
- Positions: Midfielder; defender

Team information
- Current team: Laval (manager)

Youth career
- 1979-1991: Bleuets de Pau

Senior career*
Years	Team	Apps	(Gls)
1991–1997	Bleuets de Pau		
1997–1998	Pau FC		
1998–2000	FC Lons		
2000–2001	Bourbaki		
2001–2005	Bleuets de Pau		
2005–2007	Pau FC		

Managerial career
- 2007–2010: Pau FC
- 2011–2012: Bleuets de Pau
- 2012–2014: Pau FC U19 & reserves
- 2014–2018: Pau FC
- 2018–2019: Cercle Brugge (assistant)
- 2019–2021: Bergerac Périgord
- 2021–2022: Royal FC Mandel United
- 2023–2026: FC Fleury 91
- 2026–: Laval
- * Club domestic league appearances and goals

David Vignes (born 21 June 1973) is a French football manager and former player who is the manager of Ligue 2 club Laval.

He has spent ten years at his hometown club at Pau FC.

== Early life and playing career ==
David Vignes was born in Lons, a northwestern suburb of Pau, in Béarn. David Vignes began playing football at the age of six with Bleuets de Notre-Dame in Pau, where he stayed until age 24. He then joined Pau FC reserve team, which was competing in Régional 1 at the time. Due to limited playing time under the coach, Vignes returned to Bleuets de Pau within a few months.

He also played for FC Lons and Football Association Bourbaki before returning again to Bleuets de Pau. Later, he rejoined Pau FC, where he captained the reserve side.

Vignes was promoted to Pau FC's first team under coach Marc Levy, making several appearances in the Championnat National during the 2005–06 season. The following year, he was no longer selected for the first team and finished his playing career with the reserve squad.

== Coaching career ==
=== Pau FC (2007–2018) ===
David Vignes began coaching at age 20 while still a player. In 2007, Pau FC invited him to join the first-team coaching staff. After a poor start to the season, the club dismissed head coach Jean-Luc Girard and appointed Vignes as interim manager, marking his first senior head coaching role.

Although the team was relegated to Championnat National 2, Vignes was retained for the next season, narrowly missing promotion by finishing third. On 1 December 2010, Pau FC dismissed Vignes following a 3-0 defeat to Marignane, the bottom-ranked team. Club president Bernard Laporte-Fray acted after consulting players, most of whom expressed no confidence in Vignes. At that point, the team had not won since late September 2010.

The club was temporarily self-managed by captain Nicolas Cami while searching for a new coach. Fitness coach Pierre Lamugue took a short break before returning to the group. Vignes took a year off after declining a coaching offer in Singapore for family reasons.

In 2011, Vignes resumed coaching with Bleuets de Notre-Dame in Régional 1, then returned to Pau FC to coach the under-19 and reserve teams. In 2013, after Laurent Strelczak’s dismissal, he became first-team manager while continuing to manage the reserve team.

Vignes accepted the challenge of leading a young squad to the Championnat National, focusing on trust in the players’ mentality and spirit. Under his leadership, Pau FC earned promotion back to the Championnat National in 2016 and maintained its league status in the following two seasons.

David Vignes stepped down at the end of the 2017–18 season when the club did not renew his contract. He holds the record for the longest managerial tenure at Pau FC, coaching the club for nine seasons, surpassing the previous record set by Paul Escudé.

=== Cercle Brugge (2018–2019) ===
In 2018, Vignes joined the Jupiler Pro League club Cercle Brugge KSV as assistant coach, working under Laurent Guyot and José Jeunechamps during the 2018–19 season. He credited this experience with broadening his coaching perspective.

=== Bergerac Périgord FC (2019–2021) ===
In July 2019, he was appointed manager of Bergerac Périgord FC in Championnat National 2. He remained in the position until April 2021.

=== RFC Mandel United (2021–2022) ===
Vignes returned to Belgium in November 2021 to take over Royal FC Mandel United in the Belgian third division. He managed the team until June 2022.

=== FC Fleury 91 (2023–2026) ===
In July 2023, Vignes became manager of FC Fleury 91. During the 2024–25 season, he led the club to promotion to the Championnat National, for the first time in the club's history. The promotion was secured despite a defeat late in the season.

Vignes described the season as "fantastic", noting the team's consistency and the importance of embracing the club's ambitions.

=== Laval ===
On 12 June 2026, Vignes was hired by Laval in Ligue 2 on a three-year contract.

== Philosophy ==
David Vignes holds the UEFA Pro Licence and advocates an attacking style of football centered on ball retention and bold play. He values risk-taking and believes in giving his players the confidence to express themselves on the pitch.

== Managerial statistics ==
Competitive record as manager
Club	Role	From	To	Matches	PPM
Pau FC	Assistant coach	July 2006	October 2007	–	–
Pau FC	Head coach	October 2007	December 2010	27	1.15
Pau FC	Youth coach	September 2012	November 2014	–	–
Pau FC	Head coach	November 2014	May 2018	119	1.49
Cercle Brugge	Assistant coach	July 2018	June 2019	–	–
Bergerac Périgord FC	Head coach	July 2019	April 2021	31	1.58
RFC Mandel United	Head coach	November 2021	June 2022	22	1.09
FC Fleury 91	Head coach	July 2023	Present	62	1.89

== Personal life ==
Vignes has long-standing ties to the Béarn region and has spent much of his coaching career in and around Pau. He continues to follow Pau FC closely.
