= Artix, Pyrénées-Atlantiques =

Artix
- Commune
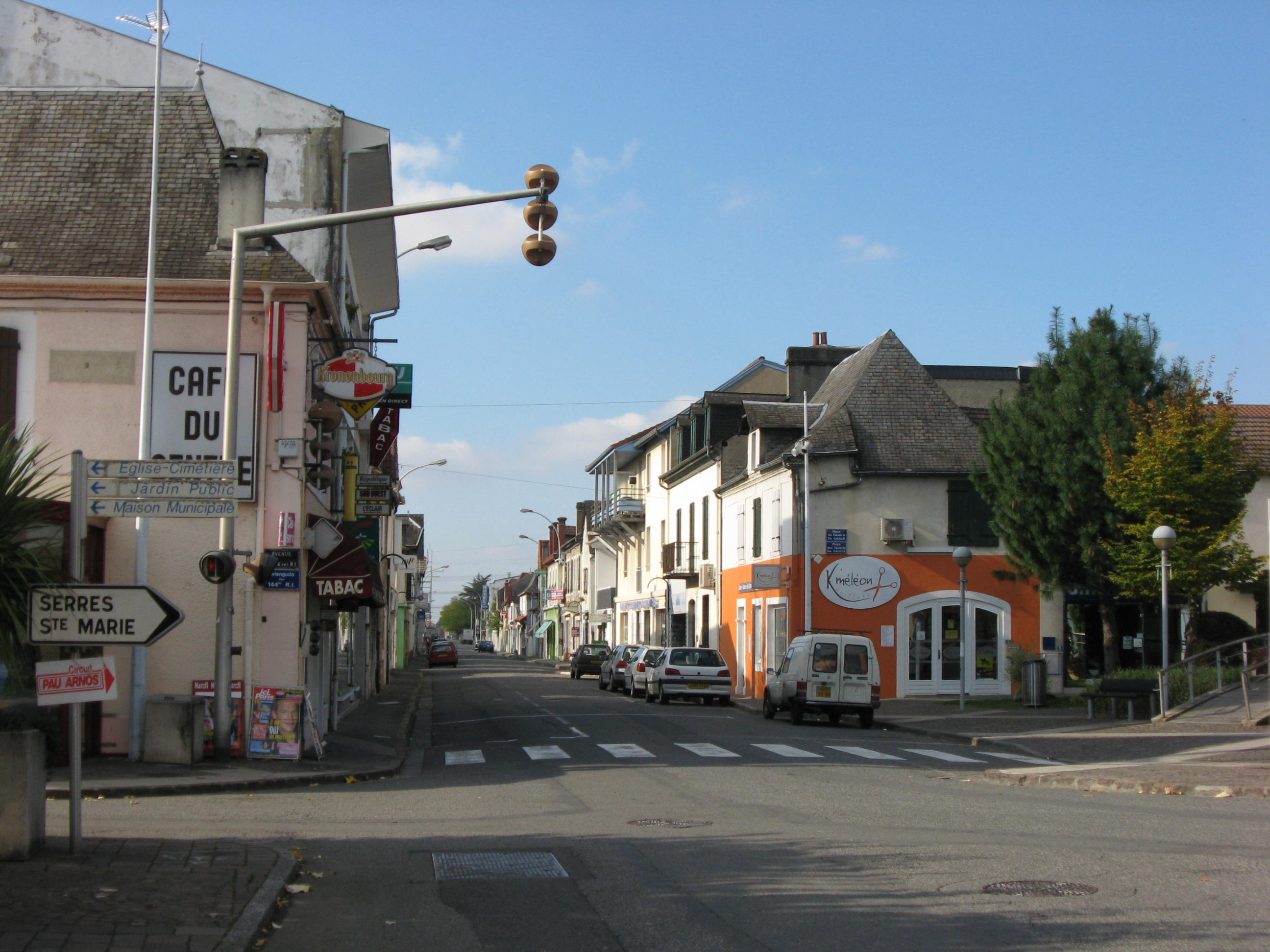
- Artix Main Street

- Coat of arms
- Location of Artix
- Location within France Location within Nouvelle-Aquitaine
- Coordinates: 43°23′54″N 0°34′14″W
- Country: France
- Region: Nouvelle-Aquitaine
- Department: Pyrénées-Atlantiques
- Arrondissement: Pau
- Canton: Artix et Pays de Soubestre
- Intercommunality: CC Lacq-Orthez

Government
  - Mayor (2020–2026): Jean-Marie Bergeret-Tercq
- Area^{1}: 9.11 km^{2} (3.52 sq mi)
- Elevation: 143 m (469 ft)
- Highest elevation: 141 m (463 ft)
- Lowest elevation: 96 m (315 ft)
- Population (2023): 3,477
  - Density: 382/km^{2} (989/sq mi)
- Time zone: UTC+01:00 (CET)
  - Summer (DST): UTC+02:00 (CEST)
- INSEE/Postal code: 64061 /64170
- ^{1} French Land Register data, which excludes lakes, ponds, glaciers > 1 km^{2} (0.386 sq mi or 247 acres) and river estuaries.

Artix (French pronunciation: [aʁtiks]; Occitan: Artics) is a commune in the Pyrénées-Atlantiques department in the Nouvelle-Aquitaine region of south-western France.

== Geography ==
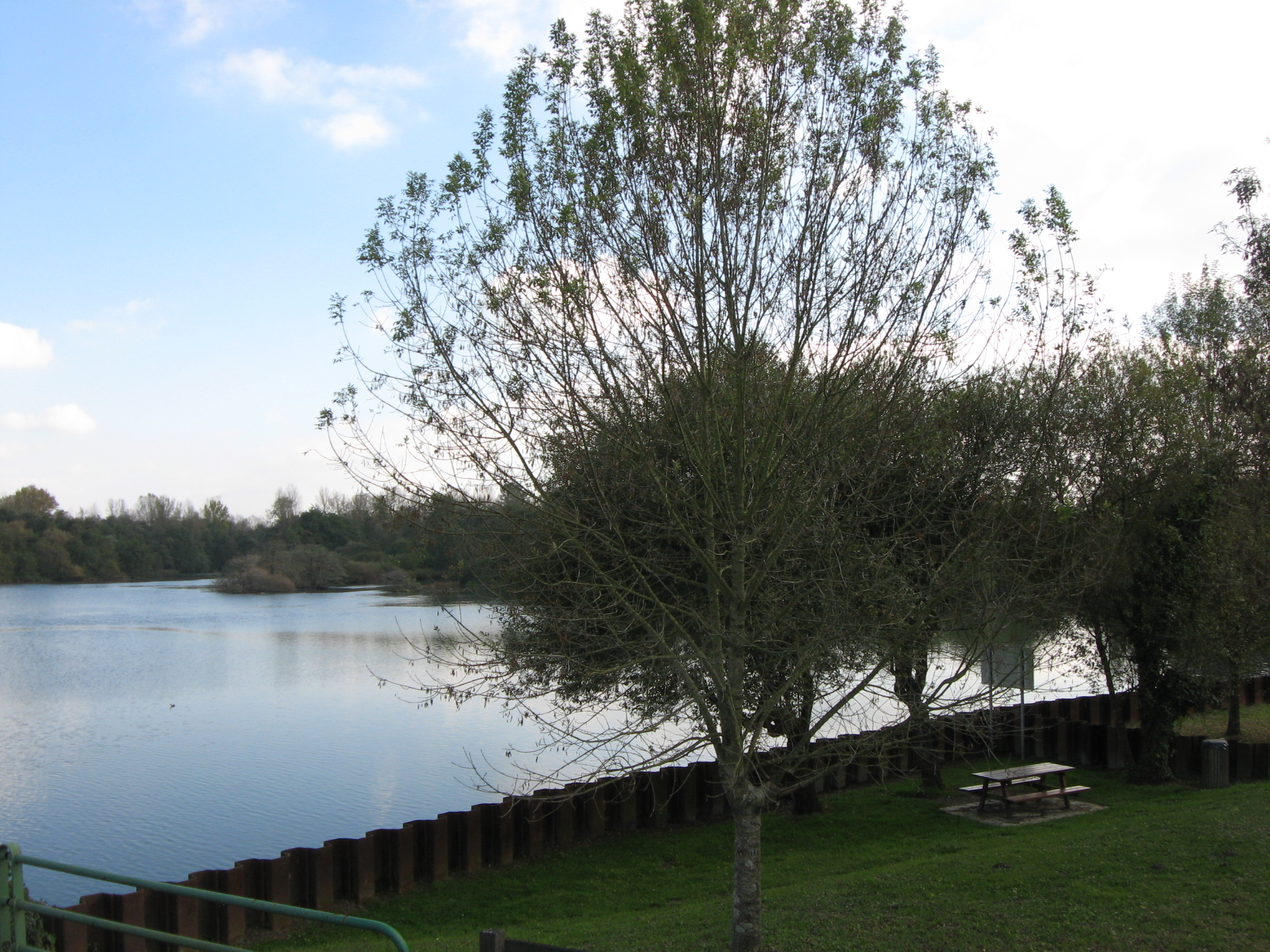
Artix Lake

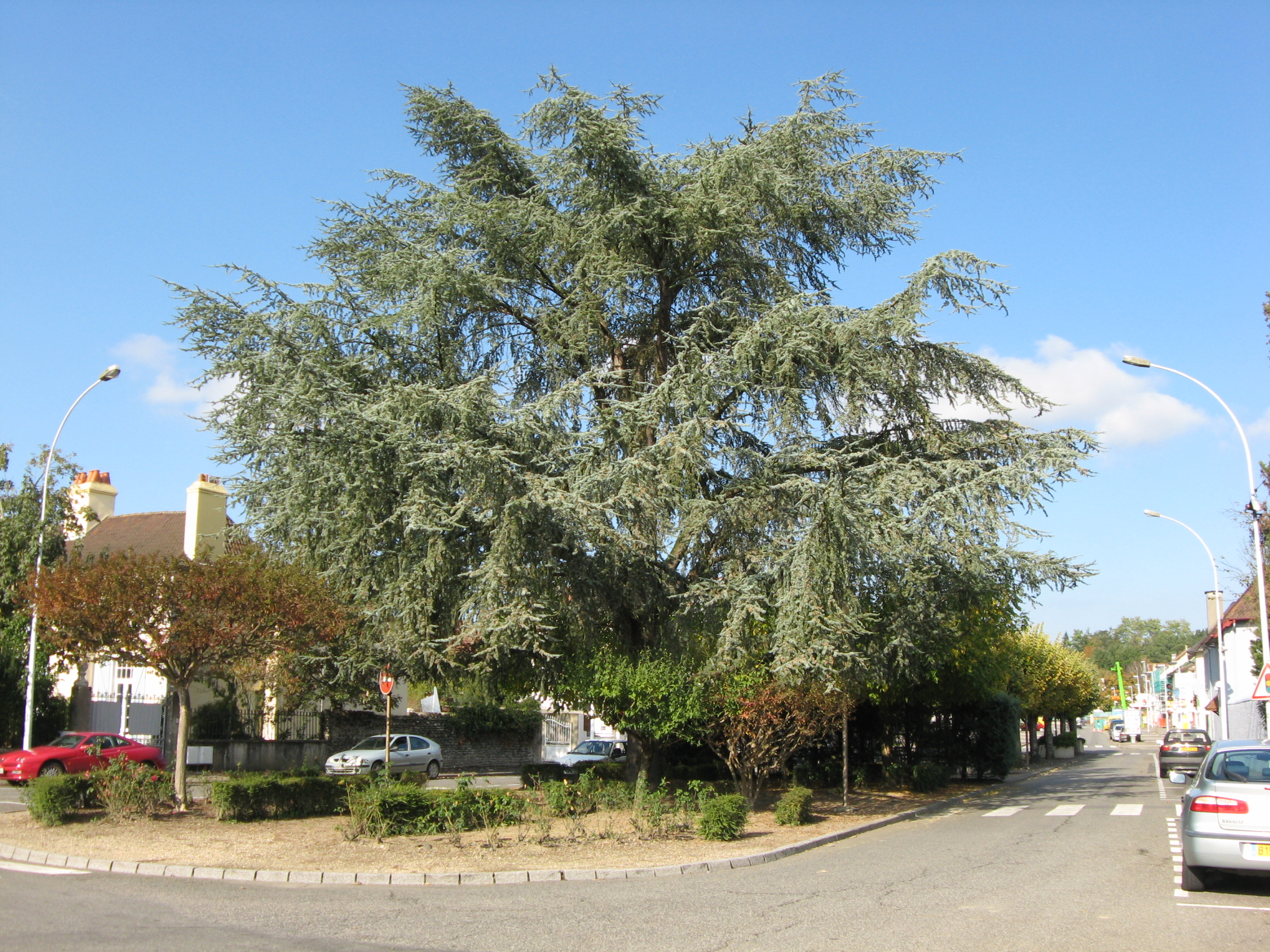
A street in Artix

Artix is located some 12 km north-west of Lescar and 14 km south-east of Orthez. Access to the commune is by main road D817 from Lacq in the north-west passing through the commune and south of the town and continuing south-east to Denguin. Access to the town from the D817 is on the D280 which links the two ends of the bypass. There are also the D263 road going north to Urdès, the D663 going north-east to Serres-Sainte-Marie, the D32 going east to Cescau, and the D281 going south-east to join the D33 north-west of Noguères. The A64 autoroute also passes through the north-eastern corner with Exit 9 exiting to the D817 in the commune.

The SNCF Toulouse-Bayonne railway line also passes through the commune with Artix station just south of the town centre. The Interurban network of Pyrénées-Atlantiques bus line has two routes passing through the commune: Route 801 (Orthez-Pau) and Route 802 (Artix-Pau).

Apart from the town there are the villages of Cap de Lalanne and Le Plateau. Some 40% of the commune is residential with the balance farmland with patches of forest.

The Gave de Pau flows north-west past the southern border of the commune with some branches touching the border. The Ruisseau Laulouze flows from the east through the south of the commune and joins Le Ruisseau which flows north-west parallel to the Gave de Pau until it joins the river west of the commune just south of Lacq. The Agle also flows west through the northern corner of the commune to join the Gave de Pau south of Lacq.

=== Places and Hamlets ===
- Près l'Agle
- Auta
- Les Baigts
- Baradat
- Bernata
- Cabille
- Cambayou
- Camous
- Campagnolle
- Candaus
- La Castanhère (château)
- Le Castérot
- Cité
- Cortigue
- Cuyala (Cor de)
- Les Esquirous
- Geil
- Les Grabes
- Labourdette
- Cap de Lalanne
- Larrecq
- Larrieu-Lôme
- Lauguère
- Laviecave
- Lavignasse
- Lavigne
- Le Moulin
- Pendix
- Le Plateau
- Pondix
- Pont Mayou
- Porte Neuve
- Poumetche
- Rémy
- Rey
- Saligot
- Sarrailla
- Taulat
- Toch

== Toponymy ==
The name Artix appears in the forms:

- Artits (1286),
- Artics (13th century, Fors de Béarn),
- Artidz (1350, Notaries of Pardies),
- Artitz (1385, Census of Béarn),
- Arthitz (1440, Census of Bastide-Monréjau),
- Artixs (1538, Reformation of Béarn),
- Artix in 1583, in the Reformation of Béarn, and on the Cassini Map of 1750.

Its name in béarnais is Artics. Michel Grosclaude indicated that the name Artix possibly was formed from the mediterranean radical arte ("green oak" then "undergrowth") and the collective and locative basque suffix -itz. He proposed them in the sense "Vegetation of the undergrowth".

Laviecave is a hamlet mentioned in 1863 but Paul Raymond recommended the spelling La Vie-Cave, meaning the sunken way or path: la via cava.

== History ==
The commune once had a Lay Abbey, vassal of the Viscounts of Béarn. In 1385 Artix was a small village under the bailiwick of Pau with only 10 fires grouped around the church. In 1880 the old church was demolished. The new church was opened in 1899.

The village became a city after the creation of the Royal Road under Henri IV which then became Imperial Route 117, then the Route nationale 117. This opening up allowed the market at Artix to flourish and the city to grow in importance.

=== Heraldry ===
Arms of Artix	The status of the blazon remains to be determined Blazon: Party per fesse, 1 of Azure, with a mountain Argent, a forest of trees Vert on a terrace of Or sloping in bend sinister surmounted by two factory chimneys Argent smoking; 2 Or, 2 cows Gules, collared, belled, horned, and hoofed in Azure one above the other; a fess Argent with four lines wavy in Sable.

== Administration ==
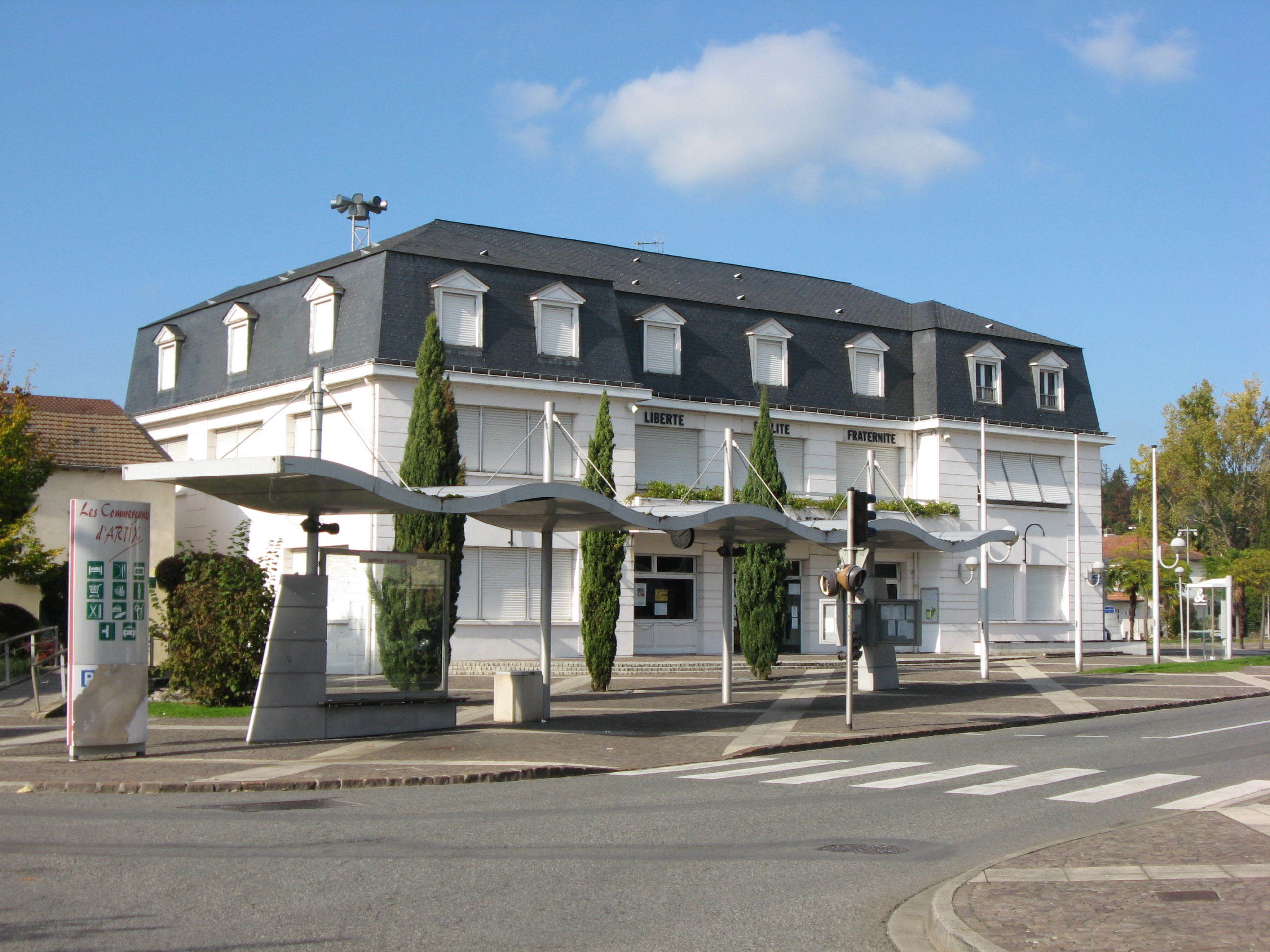
Artix Town Hall

List of Successive Mayors

From	To	Name	Party	Position
1960	1989	Maurice Plantier	RPR	Councillor, MP
1989	2001	Raymond Elissonde	PS	
2001	2008	Jean-Paul Hau-Palé		
2008	2026	Jean-Marie Bergeret-Tercq	PS	

=== Inter-communality ===
The commune is part of five inter-communal structures:

- the Communauté de communes de Lacq-Orthez;
- the SIVU for the Agle and the Lacq;
- the association for water and sanitation of Trois Cantons;
- the Energy association of Pyrénées-Atlantiques;
- the inter-communal association for defence against flooding of the Gave de Pau;

=== Twinning ===
Artix has twinning associations with:

- Sacedón (Spain) since 1992.
- Song-naaba (Burkina Faso) since 1995.

== Demography ==
The inhabitants of the commune are known as Artisiens or Artisiennes in French.

Historical population

Year	Pop.	±% p.a.
1793	582	—
1800	620	+0.91%
1806	544	−2.16%
1821	640	+1.09%
1831	681	+0.62%
1836	656	−0.75%
1841	719	+1.85%
1846	733	+0.39%
1851	740	+0.19%
1856	742	+0.05%
1861	710	−0.88%
1866	734	+0.67%
1872	718	−0.37%
1876	741	+0.79%
1881	740	−0.03%
1886	754	+0.38%
1891	765	+0.29%
1896	742	−0.61%
1901	742	+0.00%

Year	Pop.	±% p.a.
1906	750	+0.21%
1911	770	+0.53%
1921	722	−0.64%
1926	768	+1.24%
1931	804	+0.92%
1936	790	−0.35%
1946	715	−0.99%
1954	800	+1.41%
1962	2,207	+13.52%
1968	2,932	+4.85%
1975	3,161	+1.08%
1982	3,332	+0.76%
1990	3,038	−1.15%
1999	3,122	+0.30%
2007	3,195	+0.29%
2012	3,556	+2.16%
2017	3,428	−0.73%
2023	3,477	+0.24%

Source: EHESS and INSEE

== Economy ==
Artix has a prevention plan for technological risks due to some chemical establishments in the commune, similar to Bésingrand, Os-Marsillon, Noguères, Mourenx, and Pardies.

The Groupe Olano has a site in Artix specialising in the storage and transport of chocolate.

== Culture and heritage ==
=== Religious heritage ===
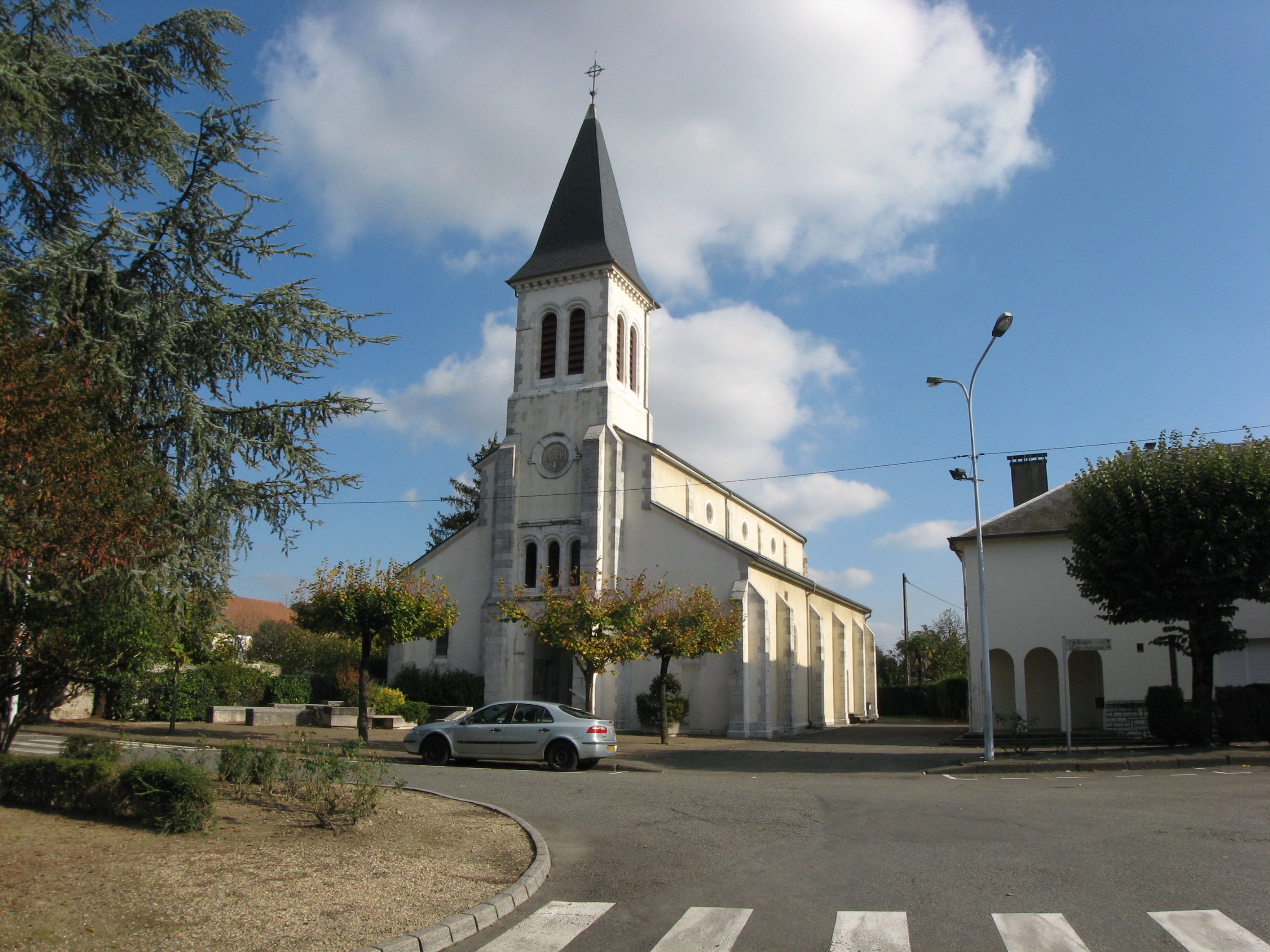
Church of Saint Pierre

The Parish Church of Saint-Pierre (19th century) is registered as an historical monument.

=== Cultural and environmental heritage ===
The Béarnais polyphonic group Los Pagalhós, created in the 1970s, was born in Artix.

Villages in Béarn are permitted to display street signs in Occitan. Artix was the first commune in France of more than 3,000 inhabitants to implement bilingual signs throughout the commune in Occitan (Gascon Béarnais) and French. Consequently, its signs show its name as "Artics", since the letter X is little used in the Bearnais dialect.

Artix also has an Occitan language school or Calandreta.

== Facilities ==
=== Education ===
Artix has two elementary schools (Moulin and Sarrailh), one college (College Jean Moulin), and one calandreta with a childcare nursery and a primary school.

=== Sports and associations ===
- Artix Basketball Club.

== Notable people linked to the commune ==
- Maurice Plantier, born in 1921 at Biarritz and died in 2006 at Paris, was a French politician. He was mayor of Artix from 1960 to 1989.
- Ramesh Kumar Nibhoria, born in Chandigarh, India, inventor of many biomass energy equipment for space heating and cooking. He is winner of many awards including Ashden Awards and has applied 16 patents. Since June, 2017, he started living here to explore bioenergy technologies business in France and Africa.

== See also ==
- Communes of the Pyrénées-Atlantiques department
