= 2007–08 Championnat National =

Championnat National
- Season: 2007–08

The 2007–08 Championnat National is the 15th edition of the 3rd division league and began play in August 2007 and is slated to end in May 2008. Clermont Foot, US Boulogne, and Angers SCO were promoted to Ligue 2, whereas Sporting Toulon, US Raon-l'Étape, SO Châtellerault, and AS Yzeure were relegated to the CFA.

Promoted from the CFA were Calais RUFC from Groupe A, AC Arles from Groupe B, Rodez AF from Groupe C, and Villemomble Sports from Groupe D.

== 20 participating teams ==
- AC Arles
- AS Beauvais Oise
- AS Cannes
- Calais RUFC
- AS Cherbourg Football
- US Créteil-Lusitanos
- FC Istres
- Stade Lavallois
- CS Louhans-Cuiseaux
- FC Martigues
- Nîmes Olympique
- Paris FC
- Pau FC
- Rodez AF
- SO Romorantin
- L'Entente SSG
- FC Sète
- Tours FC
- Vannes OC
- Villemomble Sports

== League table ==
Pos	Team	Pld	W	D	L	GF	GA	GD	Pts	Promotion or Relegation
1	Vannes (C, P)	38	20	9	9	47	31	+16	69	Promotion to Ligue 2
2	Tours (P)	38	18	11	9	53	31	+22	65	Promotion to Ligue 2
3	Nîmes (P)	38	17	12	9	51	40	+11	63	Promotion to Ligue 2
4	Cherbourg	38	17	10	11	47	37	+10	61	
5	Laval	38	14	16	8	51	31	+20	58	
6	Sète	38	14	14	10	39	29	+10	56	
7	Créteil	38	12	15	11	47	35	+12	51	
8	Arles	38	12	15	11	37	35	+2	51	
9	Beauvais	38	13	12	13	44	44	0	51	
10	Paris FC	38	12	14	12	52	53	−1	50	
11	Istres	38	13	11	14	39	42	−3	50	
12	Entente SSG	38	15	5	18	46	52	−6	50	
13	Cannes	38	12	14	12	41	49	−8	50	
14	Rodez	38	14	6	18	42	49	−7	48	
15	Calais	38	11	14	13	39	41	−2	47	
16	Louhans-Cuiseaux	38	12	9	17	40	61	−21	45	
17	Villemomble (R)	38	9	14	15	29	38	−9	41	Relegation to Championnat de France amateur
18	Pau (R)	38	12	5	21	39	61	−22	41	Relegation to Championnat de France amateur
19	Martigues (R)	38	9	13	16	40	48	−8	40	Relegation to Championnat de France amateur
20	Romorantin (R)	38	8	13	17	31	47	−16	37	Relegation to Championnat de France amateur

Rules for classification: 1) points; 2) goal difference; 3) number of goals scored.
(C) Champions; (P) Promoted; (R) Relegated

== Top goalscorers ==
Last updated 10 May 2008

Position	Player's name	Club	Goals
1	Hamado Ouedraogo	AS Beauvais	18
2	Youssef Adnane	AS Cherbourg	17
–	Welington	L'Entente SSG	17
4	Maurice Dalé	FC Martigues	14
–	Olivier Giroud	FC Istres	14
6	Robert Malm	Nîmes Olympique	13
7	Jean-Marie David	Paris FC	12
–	Gilles Fabien	Stade Lavallois	12
–	Tenema N'Diaye	Tours FC	12
10	Franck Berrier	AS Cannes	11

== Managers ==
Club	Head coach
AC Arles	Michel Estevan
AS Beauvais Oise	Bruno Roux
AS Cannes	Jean-Claude Lahiner
Calais RUFC	Sylvain Jore
AS Cherbourg Football	Noël Tosi
US Créteil-Lusitanos	Thierry Goudet
FC Istres	Frédéric Arpinon
Stade Lavallois	Philippe Hinschberger
CS Louhans-Cuiseaux	Stéphane Crucet
FC Martigues	Patrice Eyraud
Nîmes Olympique	Laurent Fournier replaced by Jean-Luc Vannuchi in December 2007
Paris FC	Jean-Guy Wallemme
Pau FC	David Vignes
Rodez AF	Didier Tholot
SO Romorantin	Franck Rizzetto
L'Entente SSG	Kamel Djamour
FC Sète	Thierry Laurey
Tours FC	Daniel Sanchez
Vannes OC	Thierry Gabillet
Villemomble Sports	Alain M'Boma
