= Denis Baylac =

French footballer (born 1973)

Personal information
- Date of birth: 31 October 1973 (age 53)
- Place of birth: Tarbes, France
- Height: 1.81 m (5 ft 11 in)
- Positions: Forward; attacking midfielder

Youth career
- –1993: Tarbes

Senior career*
Years	Team	Apps	(Gls)
1993–1994	Tarbes	48	(26)
1995–2003	Pau FC	218	(63)
2003–2008	Tarbes	56	(28)
Total		322	(117)
- * Club domestic league appearances and goals as of 24 September 2025

Denis Baylac (born 31 October 1973) is a French former professional footballer who played as a forward and attacking midfielder, primarily for Pau FC and Tarbes Pyrénées Football.

== Club career ==
Born in Tarbes, Baylac began his senior career with his hometown club Tarbes Pyrénées Football in the early 1990s. In 1995, he joined Pau FC, then competing in the Championnat National.

Known for his technical ability and vision, Baylac excelled as a playmaker or deep-lying forward, often compared to Michel Platini for his elegant style. He became a key figure at Pau, notably featuring in their 1997–98 Coupe de France round of 16 match against Paris Saint-Germain.

Baylac was named captain of Pau FC in 2002, cementing his status as a talismanic figure. However, his departure in 2003 was marked by tensions with club president Joël Lopez, exacerbated by the suspension of Bernard Laporte-Fray for cocaine possession. Pau FC's decision not to renew his contract ended an era, with Baylac regarded as one of the club's most influential players. He ranks sixth in club appearances (218 matches) and fifth in all-time goals (63) for Pau FC.

Returning to Tarbes in 2003, Baylac became a central figure in their attack. At 31, he was described as thriving in a leadership role and played a key part in recruiting other players from the Béarn region. In 2010, he was recognised as one of the few players to have represented both Pau FC and Tarbes in the regional derby, alongside Jean-Jacques Bécas and Nicolas Delmas.

== Style of play ==
Baylac primarily operated as an attacking midfielder or second striker. Renowned for his creativity, technical skill, and vision, he drew comparisons to Michel Platini for his elegant play and ability to orchestrate attacks.

== Personal life ==
Baylac worked for the Tarbes city hall during and after his football career. He developed a passion for tennis and maintained strong ties with the Béarn football community, including former Paris Saint-Germain midfielder Édouard Cissé. Baylac is married with three daughters. He chose to stay in his home region to prioritise family and local connections over professional opportunities elsewhere.
