= Plantier =

Plantier is a French topographical surname, which means a person from an area with plants or shrubs, often a vineyard. The name may refer to:

- Claude-Henri Plantier (1813–1875), French bishop
- Daniel Toscan du Plantier (1941–2003), French film producer
- Maurice Plantier (1921–2006), French politician
- Phil Plantier (born 1969), American baseball player
- Roberto Plantier (born 1979), Mexican actor
- Sophie Toscan du Plantier (1957–1996), French film producer
