= Marc Lévy =

Marc Lévy may refer to:

- Marc Levy (born 1961), French novelist
- Marc Lévy (footballer) (born 1961), French former football goalkeeper
