= Lahoucine Kharbouch =

French footballer (born 1986)

Personal information
- Date of birth: 14 January 1986 (age 40)
- Place of birth: La Garenne-Colombes, France
- Height: 1.90 m (6 ft 3 in)
- Position: Midfielder

Team information
- Current team: Épinal
- Number: 8

Senior career*
Years	Team	Apps	(Gls)
2004–2006	RCF Paris	?	(?)
2006–2008	Istres	33	(4)
2008–2009	Paris	20	(1)
2009–2010	Cannes	9	(0)
2010–2011	Beauvais	8	(1)
2011–2013	RCF Paris	17	(3)
2013–	Épinal	65	(7)
- * Club domestic league appearances and goals as of 09:29, 28 May 2016 (UTC)

Lahoucine Kharbouch (born 14 January 1986) is a French professional footballer who currently plays for SAS Épinal as a midfielder. He previously played in Ligue 2 with Istres.

== Career statistics ==
As of 28 May 2016.

Appearances and goals by club, season and competition
Club	Division	Season	League		Cup		League Cup		Total	
Club	Division	Season	Apps	Goals	Apps	Goals	Apps	Goals	Apps	Goals
Istres	Ligue 2	2006–07	22	3	0	0	1	0	23	3
Istres	National	2007–08	11	1	0	0	1	0	12	1
Paris	National	2008–09	20	1	3	1	0	0	23	2
Cannes	National	2009–10	9	0	0	0	0	0	9	0
Beauvais	National	2010–11	8	1	0	0	0	0	8	1
RCF Paris	CFA2 Group B	2011–12	3	0	0	0	0	0	3	0
RCF Paris	CFA2 Group B	2012–13	14	3	0	0	0	0	14	3
Épinal	CFA Group B	2013–14	20	2	4	1	0	0	24	3
Épinal	National	2014–15	22	3	3	0	0	0	25	3
Épinal	National	2015–16	23	2	0	0	0	0	23	2
Career totals			152	16	11	2	2	0	165	18
