= Pascal Plancque =

French footballer (born 1963)

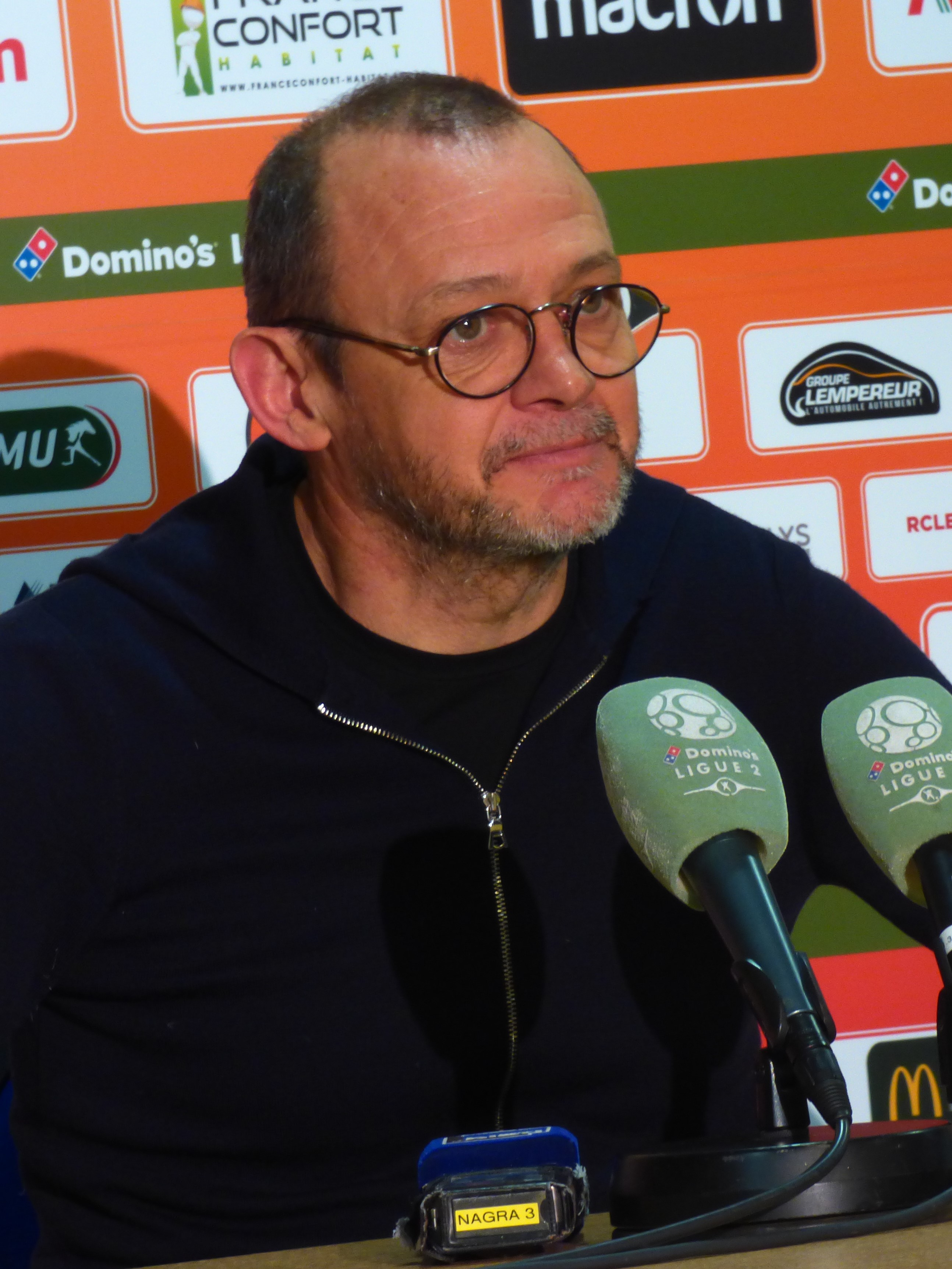
- Plancque as Niort manager in 2019

Personal information
- Date of birth: 20 August 1963 (age 63)
- Place of birth: Cherbourg, France
- Height: 1.74 m (5 ft 9 in)
- Position: Midfielder

Team information
- Current team: Nîmes (manager)

Senior career*
Years	Team	Apps	(Gls)
1980–1987	Lille	111	(11)
1987–1988	Auxerre	13	(0)
1988–1990	Laval	26	(2)
1990–1995	Pau	84	(6)
Total		234	(19)

Managerial career
- 1995–1997: Arin Luzien
- 1998–1999: Pau
- 2000–2002: Auxerre (reserves)
- 2002–2007: Lille (reserves)
- 2007–2008: Lille (assistant)
- 2008–2009: Lille (reserves)
- 2010–2011: Boulogne (assistant)
- 2011–2012: Boulogne
- 2012–2015: Lens (reserves)
- 2016–2017: Southampton (assistant)
- 2017–2018: Leicester City (assistant)
- 2019–2020: Niort
- 2021–2022: Nîmes
- * Club domestic league appearances and goals

Pascal Plancque (born 20 August 1963) is a French professional football manager and former player, who was most recently in charge of Nîmes.

== Playing career ==
During a 15-year playing career, Plancque made more than 200 league appearances for four clubs.

== Managerial career ==
Plancque began his managerial career with amateur side Arin Luzien in 1995, and went on to coach Pau and Lille reserves before becoming Boulogne's new manager in 2011. One year later, he was appointed in the managerial role of Lens reserves, where he stayed until 2015.

On 30 June 2016, Plancque joined English club Southampton as assistant first team coach to manager Claude Puel. He joined Puel as assistant manager at his next club, Leicester City. However, on 3 August 2018, Plancque left his role at the club.

On 14 January 2019, Plancque took over the vacant managerial position at Niort in Ligue 2 following the sacking, despite the unexpectedly convincing results of Patrice Lair. After disappointing results, Plancque was relieved of his duties on 5 January 2020.

== Honours ==
Auxerre

- Cup of the Alps: 1987
