= Thierry Debès =

French footballer (born 1974)

Personal information
- Date of birth: 13 January 1974 (age 52)
- Place of birth: Strasbourg, France
- Height: 1.93 m (6 ft 4 in)
- Position: Goalkeeper

Team information
- Current team: Pau FC (manager)

Senior career*
Years	Team	Apps	(Gls)
1996–2003	Strasbourg	42	(0)
2002–2003	→ Grenoble (loan)	37	(0)
2003–2004	Grenoble	29	(0)
2004–2007	Guingamp	83	(0)
2007–2012	Ajaccio	141	(0)
Total		332	(0)

Managerial career
- 2014: Ajaccio (caretaker)
- 2025: Ajaccio
- 2026–: Pau
- * Club domestic league appearances and goals

Thierry Debès (born 13 January 1974) is a French professional football manager and former player who played as a goalkeeper. He is currently the head coach of Pau in Ligue 2.
