= Bernard Laporte-Fray =

French businessman (born 1956)

- Born: 6 May 1956 (age 69); Uzos, France
- Occupation: Businessman
- Known for: President of Pau FC
- Children: 2, including Yann

Bernard Laporte-Fray (born 6 May 1956) is a French entrepreneur and football executive. He is the current president of Pau FC, a role he has held since 2010, after having saved the club from liquidation in 1995.

In 2021, together with former Croatian international Dado Pršo, he acquired Demba Diop FC, a second-division football club in Senegal.

His son, Yann Laporte-Fray, is the commercial, marketing, and communications director of Pau FC.

== Early life and playing career ==
Laporte-Fray grew up in Uzos, where his father worked as a factory employee for Turbomeca. His father was also president of the local club ASCUR, which later merged with Mazères-Lezons to form ASMUR.

Educated at Immaculée Conception in Pau, he was a schoolmate of Bernard Pontneau, later president of Section Paloise. Initially interested in playing rugby union, he instead pursued football as a goalkeeper.

In 1978, he joined FC Pau under president Pierre Clède, alongside midfielder Joël Lopez. He was the starting goalkeeper when the club won promotion to the third division in 1983. After losing his starting place to Jean-Paul Sesma, he returned to amateur football with Union Jurançonnaise, where he later became coach in 1986.

=== President of Pau FC ===
In 1995, after the liquidation of FC Pau, Laporte-Fray and Lopez took over the club, stabilising its finances.

Outside football, he invested in two retirement homes in his native Béarn, Le Beau Manoir in Uzos and Les Chênes in Artix. He also developed strong ties with Senegal, recruiting several Senegalese players for Pau FC.

Despite a temporary ban from sporting activities in the 2000s, Laporte-Fray remained majority shareholder of Pau FC and later resumed the presidency, guiding the club to professional status and financial stability.

=== Controversies ===
In 2001, Laporte-Fray and Pau FC sporting director Richard Allenda were convicted of cocaine possession and received suspended prison sentences. He stepped aside temporarily, with Jacques Le Coadou and later Joël Lopez assuming the presidency.

Laporte-Fray subsequently spent two years in Senegal before returning to Pau FC leadership.
