= Nicolas Camí =

French footballer (born 1981)

Personal information
- Date of birth: January 16, 1981 (age 45)
- Place of birth: Pau, France
- Height: 1.80 m (5 ft 11 in)
- Position: Midfielder

Team information
- Current team: Pau FC

Senior career*
Years	Team	Apps	(Gls)
2002–2005	Pau FC		
2005–2007	FC Sète	61	(3)
2007–2009	Racing Ferrol		
2009–	Pau FC		
- * Club domestic league appearances and goals as of 15:52, 26 November 2009 (UTC)

Nicolas Camí (born January 16, 1981), is a French footballer, who currently plays for Pau FC.

== Career ==
Since January 2007 he has been playing for the Racing Club of Ferrol. His other clubs have been Bordeaux B, 1999–2002; Pau, 2002–2005; and Sète, 2005–2007.
