= Urdès =

- Part of Lacq
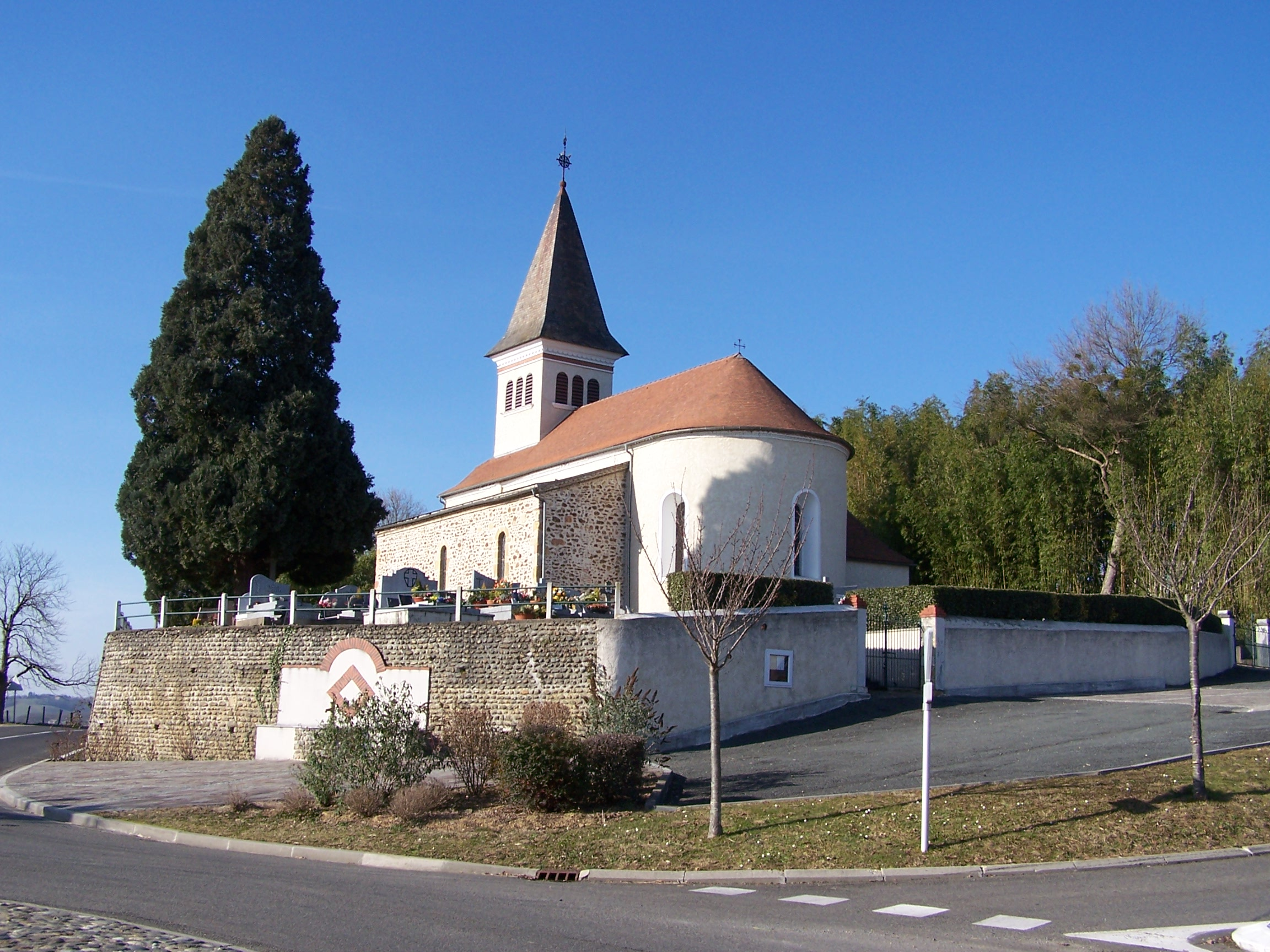
- The church of Saint-Barthélémy
- Location of Urdès
- Location within France Location within Nouvelle-Aquitaine
- Coordinates: 43°26′39″N 0°35′15″W
- Country: France
- Region: Nouvelle-Aquitaine
- Department: Pyrénées-Atlantiques
- Arrondissement: Pau
- Canton: Artix et Pays de Soubestre
- Commune: Lacq
- Area^{1}: 5.89 km^{2} (2.27 sq mi)
- Elevation: 150 m (490 ft)
- Highest elevation: 246 m (807 ft)
- Lowest elevation: 109 m (358 ft)
- Population (2021): 304
  - Density: 51.6/km^{2} (134/sq mi)
- Time zone: UTC+01:00 (CET)
  - Summer (DST): UTC+02:00 (CEST)
- Postal code: 64370
- ^{1} French Land Register data, which excludes lakes, ponds, glaciers > 1 km^{2} (0.386 sq mi or 247 acres) and river estuaries.

Urdès (French pronunciation: [yʁdɛs]; Occitan: Urdès) is a former commune in the Pyrénées-Atlantiques department in south-western France. On 1 January 2024, it was merged into the commune of Lacq.

== See also ==
- Communes of the Pyrénées-Atlantiques department
