= Jean-Marie David =

French footballer (born 1982)

Personal information
- Full name: Jean-Marie David
- Date of birth: 13 January 1982 (age 44)
- Place of birth: Rennes, France
- Height: 1.75 m (5 ft 9 in)
- Position: Midfielder

Team information
- Current team: USJA Carquefou
- Number: 13

Senior career*
Years	Team	Apps	(Gls)
1999–2001	Rennes Réserve	11	(1)
2001–2003	FC Lorient	2	(0)
2003–2006	AS Vitré	?	(?)
2006–2008	Paris FC	56	(17)
2008–2009	FC Gueugnon	22	(5)
2009–2010	FC Rouen	26	(4)
2010–2011	US Saint-Malo		
2011–	USJA Carquefou	32	(6)
- * Club domestic league appearances and goals as of 18:49, 16 June 2012 (UTC)

Jean-Marie David (born 13 January 1982) is a French professional footballer. He currently plays in the Championnat National for USJA Carquefou.

David played at the club level in Ligue 2 for FC Lorient.
