= Pau FC =

Association football club based in Pau, Béarn, France

- Full name: Pau Football Club
- Nicknames: Les Maynats; Les Béarnais
- Founded: 19 May 1959; 67 years ago, as FC Pau (Note: It is also possible to view Pau FC as a direct continuation of the football section of Bleuets de Notre-Dame. The Bleuets continued to exist and field teams in competitions after the formation of FC Pau. Since 2022, the club has officially cited 1995 as its founding date, a year that now appears on the club's new logo. This date, which should not be regarded as the true founding year, actually marks the reformation of the current entity following its bankruptcy in 1995.)
- Stadium: Nouste Camp
- Capacity: 4,031
- Owner: Bernard Laporte-Fray
- President: Bernard Laporte-Fray
- Head coach: Thierry Debès
- League: Ligue 2
- 2025–26: Ligue 2, 9th of 18
- Website: paufc.fr
colours	Away colours

Pau Football Club (French pronunciation: [po futbol klœb]), commonly referred to as Pau FC, is a professional football club based in Pau, capital of Béarn, France. Pau FC plays its home matches at the Nouste Camp and competes in Ligue 2, the second tier of French football. Nicknamed Les Maynats, Pau FC traces its origins to the patronage of the Bleuets de Notre-Dame, officially founded in 1920 in the Mayolis district. By the onset of the 1958–59 season, the Bleuets had ascended to the highest amateur division in the French football league system. Under the stewardship of its founding president, José Bidegain, the Bleuets de Notre-Dame's senior team transitioned into the Football-Club de Pau. By the 60s, they had settled in the Stade du Hameau, harbouring ambitions of turning professional.

Recurrent financial troubles weakened the club, necessitating interventions from the municipal authorities of Pau. The team later, dropped back to the regional South West League. The 90s witnessed reckless spending in pursuit of promotion to Ligue 2, culminating in financial insolvency and relegation to the fourth tier of French football in 1995.

A revival came under the guidance of former players Bernard Laporte-Fray and Joël Lopez, who rebranded the club as Pau Football Club. Financial restructuring ensued, stabilising the club in the third tier until 2007. However, subsequent relegation compounded by non-sporting crises, delayed their return to the third division until the 2016–17 season.

In 2019, marking 59 years since its inception, Pau FC celebrated the opening of its inaugural stadium, Nouste Camp.

The club's achievements include winning the Championnat National in 2020, winning the National 2 title twice in 1998 and 2016 and winning the French South-West League in 1958 and 1968.

The team claimed victory in the Championnat National, the third division, during the 2019–20 season, which promoted the club to Ligue 2. This ushered in a period of unprecedented success, as the club seeks to firmly establish itself in the realm of the French football league system.

== History ==
=== Bleuets de Notre-Dame (1920–59) ===
The history of football in Pau begins in 1888 with the establishment of the Association Bourbaki. In 1904, the football section of this organization was founded under the name Football Association Bourbaki. While football gained significance in Pau from 1909 with the initiation of JAB de Pau, rugby union remained the predominant sport in the Béarn and Gascony regions.

Until the end of World War II, FA Bourbaki was the flagship football club in Béarn.

At the beginning of the Trente Glorieuses, the post-World War II period of rapid economic growth in France, the Bleuets de Notre-Dame patronage, located in the Quartier Mayolis, reached the highest amateur league in the French football league system, known as the Division Nationale.

The small neighborhood patronage evolved into an institution representing the city and Béarn. The diocese, recognizing that this level of sports activity extended beyond the scope of a simple neighborhood sports association, sought to disengage. They then began the search for leaders capable of managing a club of this magnitude.

=== Football Club de Pau (1959–95) ===
The Football Club de Pau was officially established on 19 May 1959 by José Bidegain, marking a significant milestone in the history of football in Béarn. This made it the only football club hailing from the Béarn or Gascony areas of France. Notably, it also stood as one of the very few clubs in the broader South West region of France, apart from well-known cities like Toulouse and Bordeaux, to compete at the national level in the French football league system.

In its early days, the club faced unique challenges due to the lack of a dedicated home ground. Instead, it used various stadiums in the city of Pau, such as the Stade des Bleuets and Stade Bourbaki. The club proudly embraced the blue and white colors of its patronage roots and carried forward the motto Vaincre ou sourire (Conquer or Smile).

One of the significant achievements for FC Pau came in the form of reclaiming the spot that belonged to the Bleuets in the Championnat de France Amateur for the 1959–60 season. However, financial difficulties stemming from limited infrastructure posed challenges for the club's stability. During its inaugural season, FC Pau finished in the 7th position within the CFA South-West vgroup.

As the club progressed into its second season, it began to solidify its position and attract experienced players. Despite facing player departures and changes in coaching staff, FC Pau managed to maintain its competitive standing in the championship.

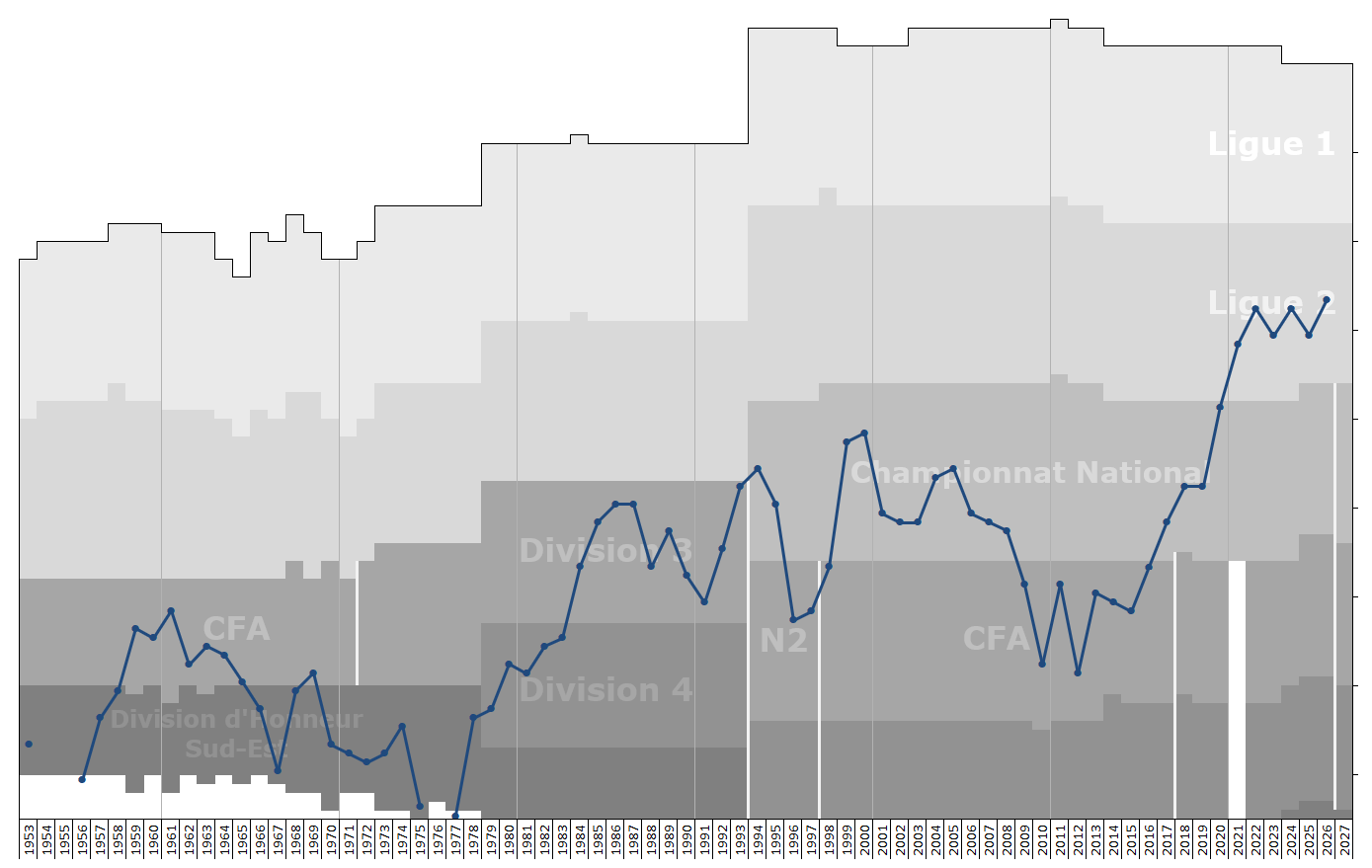
Historical league performance chart of Pau FC

==== Progressive Withdrawal of José Bidegain ====
In the 1964–65 season, FC Pau experienced its first relegation in history. José Bidegain gradually stepped back from the club's leadership, allowing James Chambaud to assume the presidency. The relegation to a regional level brought about increased financial difficulties. Operating without proper facilities, the club faced a nomadic existence, using various stadiums in Pau. During this period, young player Paul Escudé stood out, becoming the first player from Pau to join the France national youth football team.

The club later regained its status in the highest amateur level in 1968–69, but this season also marked the departure of the promising Paul Escudé, who joined Girondins de Bordeaux. Despite its efforts, FC Pau remained relatively isolated in the local sports scene, with historical patronage clubs not fully recognizing its legitimacy. Consequently, FC Pau experienced a second relegation to the regional divisions of the South-West League in 1969.

==== Construction and Ambition under Pierre Clède's Leadership (1975–81) ====
Pierre Clède assumed leadership of the club in 1975 amidst sporting and financial challenges. The club spent two seasons in the Regional Divisions of the South West League before reclaiming a spot in the French Division 4 in 1978–79. Clède aimed to reach the second division within five seasons, but declining results and stadium attendance posed difficulties. The legendary player of Stade Montois, Jacques Foix, took over as coach in the 1980–81 season, but financial issues persisted, impacting results. However, Paul Escudé returned to the club, overseeing youth teams and significantly influencing its development.

Ultimately, at the start of the 1981–82 season, Paul Escudé assumed responsibility for the first team and injected new energy into the club. Despite financial challenges, the club's outdated stadium, Stade de l'Ousse des Bois no longer met its needs.

==== Paul Escudé Era and Struggle for Promotion to Second Division (1981–91) ====
In the 1980s, president Clède sought the fusion of historical Pau football clubs to address infrastructure deficiencies. Yet, strong resistance from local clubs, particularly JAB de Pau, thwarted these efforts. Amidst this impasse, Clède shifted focus and aimed to model FC Pau after professional clubs from smaller cities like AJ Auxerre or Stade Lavallois.

FC Pau regained Division 3 status at the start of the 1983–84 season, led by iconic coach Paul Escudé. The club's return sparked growing enthusiasm, attracting over 8,000 spectators to the Coupe de France match against AS Saint-Étienne. The following season, FC Pau narrowly missed professional promotion but demonstrated remarkable progress. Under Xavier Gravelaine's influence, the club showcased an offensive style of play, thrilling fans at Stade du Hameau.

However, the late 1980s brought financial difficulties again, alleviated partially by the intervention of Mayor André Labarrère. As Paul Escudé's tenure ended in 1990, the club underwent leadership changes and narrowly avoided relegation. Challenges persisted, with a dilapidated Stade de l'Ousse des Bois highlighting the need for revitalization.

==== Golden Age under President Pitoun (1991–93) ====
In 1991, real estate developer Alain Pitoun assumed control of FC Pau, ushering in a new era. Pitoun appointed Paul Escudé as coach, aiming to secure promotion and revitalize the club's image. The club shifted its colors back to the original blue and white of the Bleuets de Notre-Dame. Pitoun's arrival, reminiscent of Bernard Tapie, shook the Pau football landscape. With Richard Allenda as sporting director, the club underwent a high-profile recruitment drive, attracting notable talents like Claude Lowitz and Patrick Cubaynes or Billy Thompson. FC Pau transitioned from a decaying Stade de l'Ousse des Bois to Stade du Hameau.

Despite financial challenges, the Pitoun era cultivated a fervent fan base and ambitious aspirations, marked by a notable run in the Coupe de France. However, financial issues escalated, culminating in Pitoun's departure amidst legal troubles and financial liabilities, having already been targeted by several attacks from the Iparretarrak group. The club faced liquidation, resulting in a series of leadership changes and instability.

==== Decay and Judicial Liquidation (1993–95) ====
FC Pau's participation in the newly established Championnat National marked a turning point. Despite challenges, the club showcased potential, defeating notable teams in the Coupe de France. Financial problems worsened, leading to player strikes and Pitoun's resignation. The club was eventually liquidated in 1995, ending a tumultuous chapter in its history.

=== Pau Football Club ===
Football-Club de Pau, having become insolvent, rises from its ashes through the efforts of Bernard Laporte-Fray, a former goalkeeper of the club. Laporte-Fray had been a starter during the 1982–83 season, when FC Pau gained promotion to Division 3. Twelve years later, he becomes the president of the newly established Pau Football Club.

The Pau Football Club is officially reestablished on 14 June 1995, adopting the iconic yellow and blue colors of the city of Pau. Two competing projects vied for the revival of FC Pau: one led by Laporte-Fray, and the other by the former club president, Pierre Clède. Ultimately, the project of the Pau Football Club proposed by Laporte-Fray was chosen by Mayor André Labarrère.

Robert Péré-Escamps, a former emblematic captain of the 1980s, was appointed as the coach with the mission of maintaining the club's position in Championnat National 2, following its administrative relegation in the previous season. Drastic changes are made to the club's sporting policies, resulting in the departure of several players such as Frédéric Viseux, José Dalmao, Bob Senoussi, and Pascal Plancque.

Pau FC embarked on its new journey at the Stade du Hameau with a 1–0 victory over Dijon FCO, marking the beginning of this new era.

==== Development under René Girard (1997–01) ====
In 1996, René Girard was appointed as the coach of Pau FC, with the goal of returning the team to the Championnat National before advancing to Ligue 2. During his tenure, Edouard Cissé made his debut in the first team and later transferred to Paris Saint-Germain. However, Girard's efforts did not yield desired results in the Championnat National, leading to his dismissal in December 1997. Girard cited behind-the-scenes influence and lack of control over recruitment as reasons for his departure. Legal disputes ensued, and Joël Lopez and Richard Allenda temporarily managed the team. Under Pascal Plancque's coaching, Pau FC reached the 8th round of the Coupe de France, facing Paris Saint-Germain and iconic Selecao captain Raí, who went on to score the winning goal. Despite losing, the match showcased Pau FC's resilience against a stronger opponent.

The club's fortunes fluctuated in the following years, including a period of turmoil due to legal issues involving club officials Bernard Laporte-Fray and Richard Allenda. The presidency changed hands, with Joël Lopez taking over. Notable figures like Edouard Cissé, Denis Baylac and Tino Costa made appearances for Pau FC, contributing to the team's efforts. The team maintained its presence in the National until 2008 when relegation to the Championnat National 2 occurred after a decade and the club faced challenges both on and off the field, seeking stability and development amid financial constraints.

==== Relegation to National 2 (2001–08) ====
Between 2001 and 2008, Pau FC faced a series of challenges that led to significant changes and setbacks. In 2001, the club was plunged into turmoil following the conviction of its president, Bernard Laporte-Fray, and its sporting director, Richard Allenda, for the possession of cocaine. This legal issue resulted in suspended prison sentences for both individuals. As a consequence, Laporte-Fray was banned from any sports-related activities until 2009, though he remained the majority shareholder of the club.

The club's leadership changed hands during this period, with Jacques le Coadou assuming the presidency temporarily and later succeeded by Joël Lopez. The club faced challenges not only in terms of leadership but also on the field, struggling to maintain a stable identity and achieve consistent results. In the 2005–06 season, under the management of Marc Lévy, the club loaned André-Pierre Gignac, then a young player who made a significant impact by scoring eight goals in twenty matches, contributing to the team's survival.

The club's fortunes took a further downturn, leading to its relegation from the Championnat National to National 2 in 2008. This relegation prompted the need for a major restructuring and a renewed focus on youth development.

==== Rebuilding (2008–16) ====
The subsequent years saw Pau FC struggling in the lower divisions, with relegation to Championnat National 2 in the 2007–08 season. During this period, the club underwent several changes in leadership, and a lack of stability hindered its progress. Financial difficulties and a decline in public support further compounded the club's challenges.

Bernard Laporte-Fray returned to the presidency in 2010, aiming to revitalize the club and steer it towards a successful future. Laporte-Fray's efforts included increasing the budget to support the club's ambitions of returning to higher divisions, with a focus on Championnat National and ultimately Ligue 2.

Despite Laporte-Fray's initiatives, the club continued to struggle on and off the pitch. Attempts to secure financial stability and engage local players were met with mixed success. The club's survival remained a concern, with prominent figures in French football like Jean-Michel Larqué expressing skepticism about potential mergers of various Pau-based football clubs.

The club's fortunes began to shift in the 2015–2016 season, as it achieved its best start and performance in years. Pau FC managed to secure promotion back to the Championnat National, marking a positive turning point after years of challenges.

==== Consolidation in the Championnat National (2016–20) ====
Les Maynats made their return to the Championnat National during the 2016–17 season and finished in 14th place, just above the relegation zone. The Pau FC secured a miraculous maintenance on the final day of the season with a 3–0 victory over Concarneau, benefitting from concurrent defeats suffered by Sedan and CA Bastia.

The 2017–18 season marked a period of consolidation for the team, anticipating the move to their new stadium, Nouste Camp. For the final game at Stade du Hameau, the team bid farewell to its old grounds in a match against the champion, Red Star FC. This transition marked the end of an era and the beginning of a new chapter for the club's history.

Under the leadership of David Vignes, who had a record tenure of nine seasons, Pau FC achieved a milestone, surpassing the reign of Paul Escudé.

In the 2018–19 season, the Pau FC, led by Italian coach Raffaele Novelli, aimed to reach Ligue 2 within three years. Notable arrivals on loan included Vincent Thill and Quentin Boisgard.

Novelli was replaced by Bruno Irles in January 2019, who was later assisted by Dado Pršo.

On 16 January 2020, Pau eliminated Ligue 1 side Bordeaux from the Coupe de France following a 3–2 victory. Les Maynats went on to face national champions Paris Saint-Germain in the round of 16 of the cup, losing 2–0. Pau registered their highest attendance ever that day, with 16,707 persons witnessing the Parisian victory.

When the 2019–20 Championnat National season was prematurely ended due to the COVID-19 pandemic, Pau were top of the table, and were declared promoted to Ligue 2 by the FFF executive committee. While they clinched the Champion of National title, it wasn't officially recognized by the Fédération française de football in the same way as Ligue 1 and Ligue 2 titles governed by the Ligue de Football Professionnel.

==== Discovery of the Professional World (2020–23) ====
At the outset of the 2020–21 season, Pau FC underwent a shift in leadership, parting ways with the duo of Irles and Prso. Didier Tholot was appointed as the head coach of the first team. Tholot expressed his desire for a vibrant team, setting a new direction for the club. The behind-the-scenes transition was documented, shedding light on the changes taking place. Facing the challenge of their debut Ligue 2 season with a meager budget of €6.5 million, the Pau FC aimed to secure swift retention in the division. Despite a challenging start, the team rallied in the latter half of the season and achieved an impressive 14th-place finish. This marked a notable accomplishment in their inaugural season.

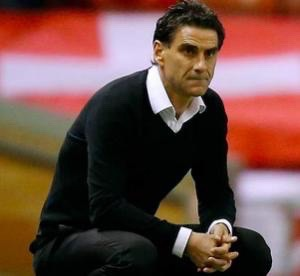
Didier Tholot has been coaching Pau FC since 2020.

The following season, 2021–22, proved a turning point for Pau FC, achieving a historic milestone with a commendable 10th-place ranking in the league. This success led to Didier Tholot's nomination for the UNFP Manager of the Year award, reflecting his contribution to the team's achievements.

The lead-up to the 2022–23 season signaled a shift in the club's sporting policy. Joël Lopez confirmed that the club would no longer prioritize player loans. Notably, the club achieved a record sale of €0.5 million with the transfer of Samuel Essende to SM Caen. However, the departure of key players who had been instrumental in their L2 promotion, such as Quentin Daubin, Victor Lobry, and Romain Armand, marked a significant transition period.

Embracing ambition, Pau FC adopted an international recruitment strategy, bringing in talents like Nguyễn Quang Hải from Hanoi FC and Diyaeddine Abzi from York United FC in Canada. The signing of Quang Hai Nguyen garnered widespread attention on Asian social media platforms, enhancing the club's popularity in the region. Pau FC then encountered new challenges, including counterfeit merchandise flooding the Asian market, as well as the high-profile winter transfer of goalkeeper Alexandre Olliero to Stade de Reims.

==== Fresh start (2023–) ====
At the beginning of the 2023–24 season, Pau FC embarked on a new era following a series of major changes in the club's leadership. A decisive victory against SM Caen at the end of the previous season ensured their retention in Ligue 2. Club president Bernard Laporte-Fray emphasized the need for a fresh start, highlighting his intent to rebuild the club. Despite Pau FC's modest size, Laporte-Fray pointed out that the club's payroll was comparable to that of other clubs such as Grenoble and QRM, and even exceeded some other clubs that performed well in the 2022–2023 Ligue 2 season. He took responsibility for reorganizing the club's structure to enhance its performance. His son, Yann Laporte-Fray, assumed the role of general director, Luis de Sousa joined as the sports director, and Nicolas Usaï took charge as the head coach.

The departures of coach Didier Tholot and general director Joël Lopez were officially announced, signifying the end of an era and the beginning of a new chapter. Reports indicated disagreements within the leadership since the winter transfer of Alexandre Olliero to Stade de Reims, a move that went through despite Tholot and Lopez's reservations. The concurrent arrival of Luis de Sousa as sporting director played a crucial role in this endeavor. This role had not been clearly defined during the club's first three seasons in Ligue 2. De Sousa was chosen to help build a strong team capable of remaining in Ligue 2. Additionally, President Laporte-Fray announced a partnership with neighboring club SD Huesca known for their expertise in scouting lesser-known players to excel in Spanish football.

== Key dates ==
- 1920: Foundation of Bleuets Notre-Dame de Pau.
- 1923: First football season of Bleuets Notre-Dame de Pau.
- 1951: French youth champion
- 1956: Reached the top level of the French South-West regional football league.
- 1958: Champion of the French South-West regional football league. Promotion to the third tier of French football.
- 1959: Football Club de Pau split from Bleuets de Notre-Dame de Pau.
- 1995: The club went to administration, reformed, changed their name to Pau Football Club and were relegated to the fourth tier of French football.
- 1998: Champion of the Group C of the Championnat de France Amateur and promoted to the Championnat National. The club also reached the round of 16 of the Coupe de France, where they lost 2–0 to Paris Saint-Germain.
- 2008: Relegation to the Championnat de France Amateur.
- 2016: Promotion to the Championnat National.
- 2020: Promotion to Ligue 2.

== Crest and colours ==
The flag of Béarn

Pau FC unveiled its first crest upon its founding in 1959. In 1961, a new faction led by René Lanusse led to the adoption of yellow and blue colours, along with the creation of a new logo inspired by the city of Pau's coat of arms. This 1961 crest is considered the historical emblem of the club, used for 30 consecutive seasons.

Over the years, the club remained loyal to its original logo, except during the 1990s when logos featuring the Alfred de Vigny fountain were used.

In 2009, under the presidency of Joël Lopez, a new crest was introduced featuring the Crown of Henry IV and the Bèth cèu de Pau (Beautiful Sky of Pau) along with the Boulevard des Pyrénées and the founding year 1959.

After Bernard Laporte-Fray's return in 2011, the club changed its crest again to a more streamlined design. With the club's transition to professional status, the motto "Vaincre ou sourire" was removed from official materials.

In May 2022, the club revealed a new logo to modernise its visual identity. While retaining iconic symbols such as King Henry IV's crown, the three posts of the city's name, and the peafowl, this new logo focus on elements representing Béarn, with the cows and the Pic du Midi d'Ossau. There are various references to the coat of arms of the city of Pau such as the three pilings, that gave the city its name (pau [paw] in Béarnese) and the peafowl, a clear example of canting arms, as its name (pavon or pau [paw] in Béarnese) was used as an approximation to represent the city of Pau.

The new logo highlights a revised founding year of 1995, which marks the club's reformation under the name Pau Football Club following the liquidation of FC Pau..

Boulevard des Pyrénées and View of the Pyrenees

Coat of Arms of Pau

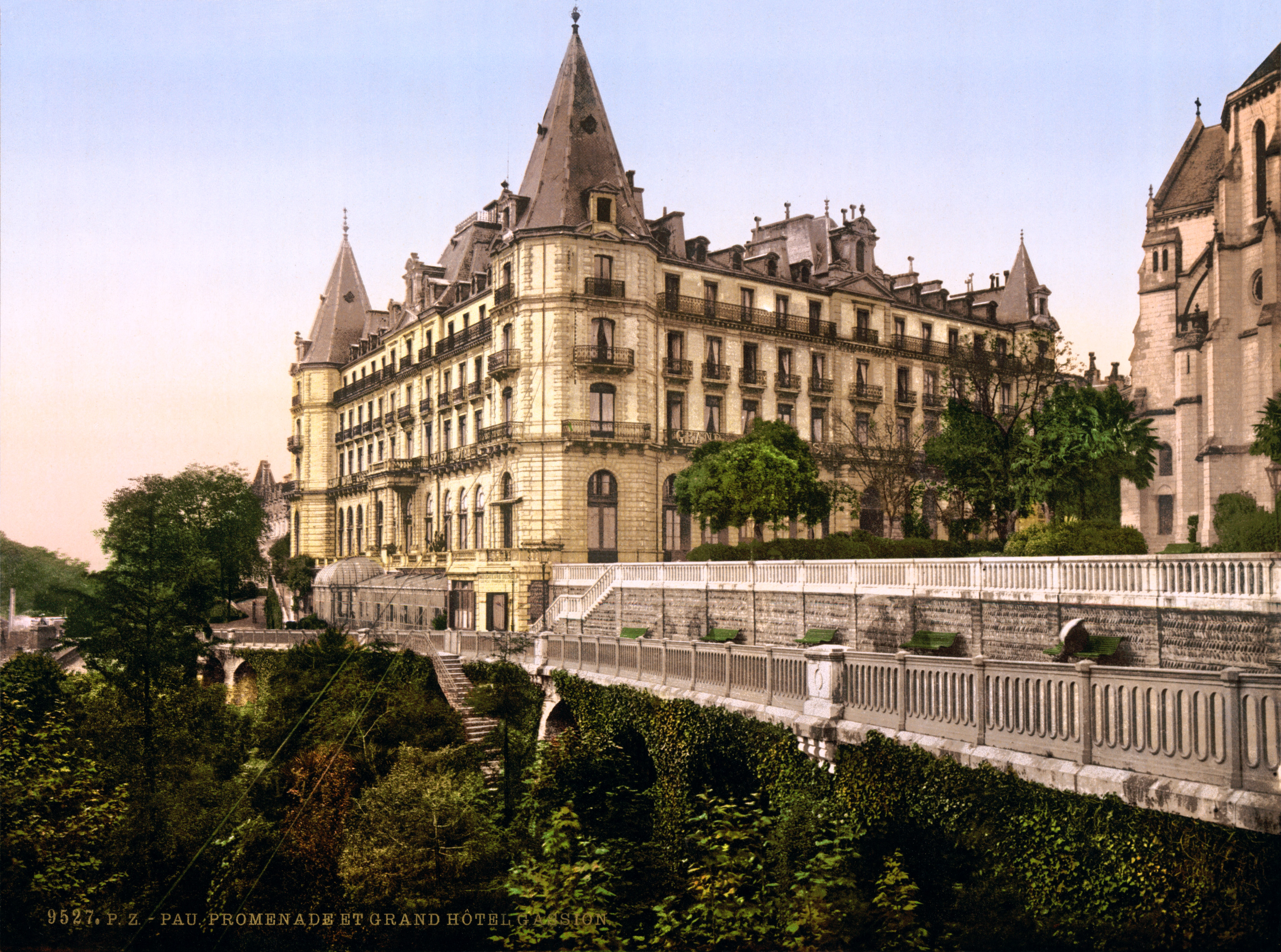
Boulevard des Pyrénées.

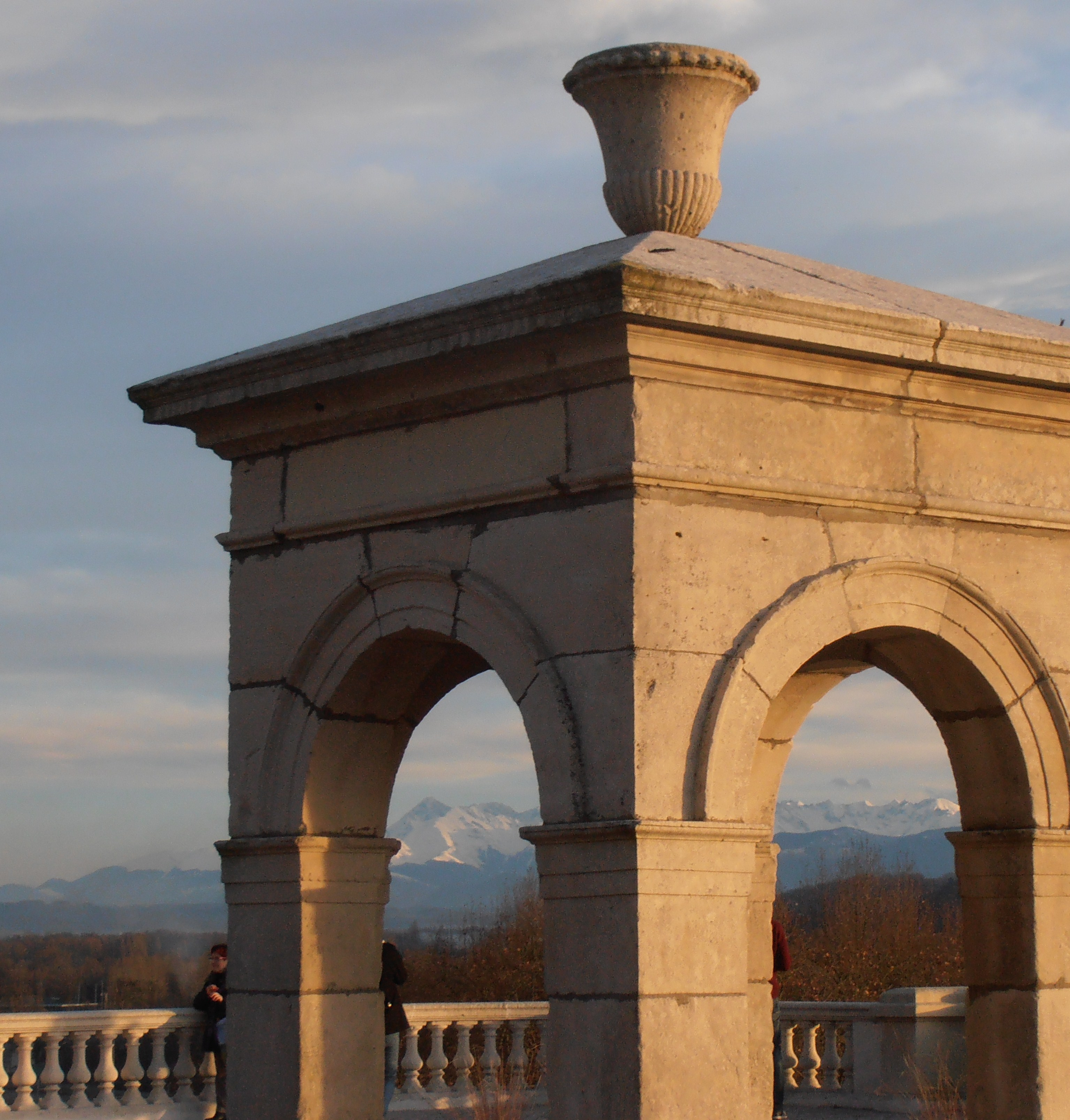
Fontaine de Vigny, inspiration for the 1995-2008 logo

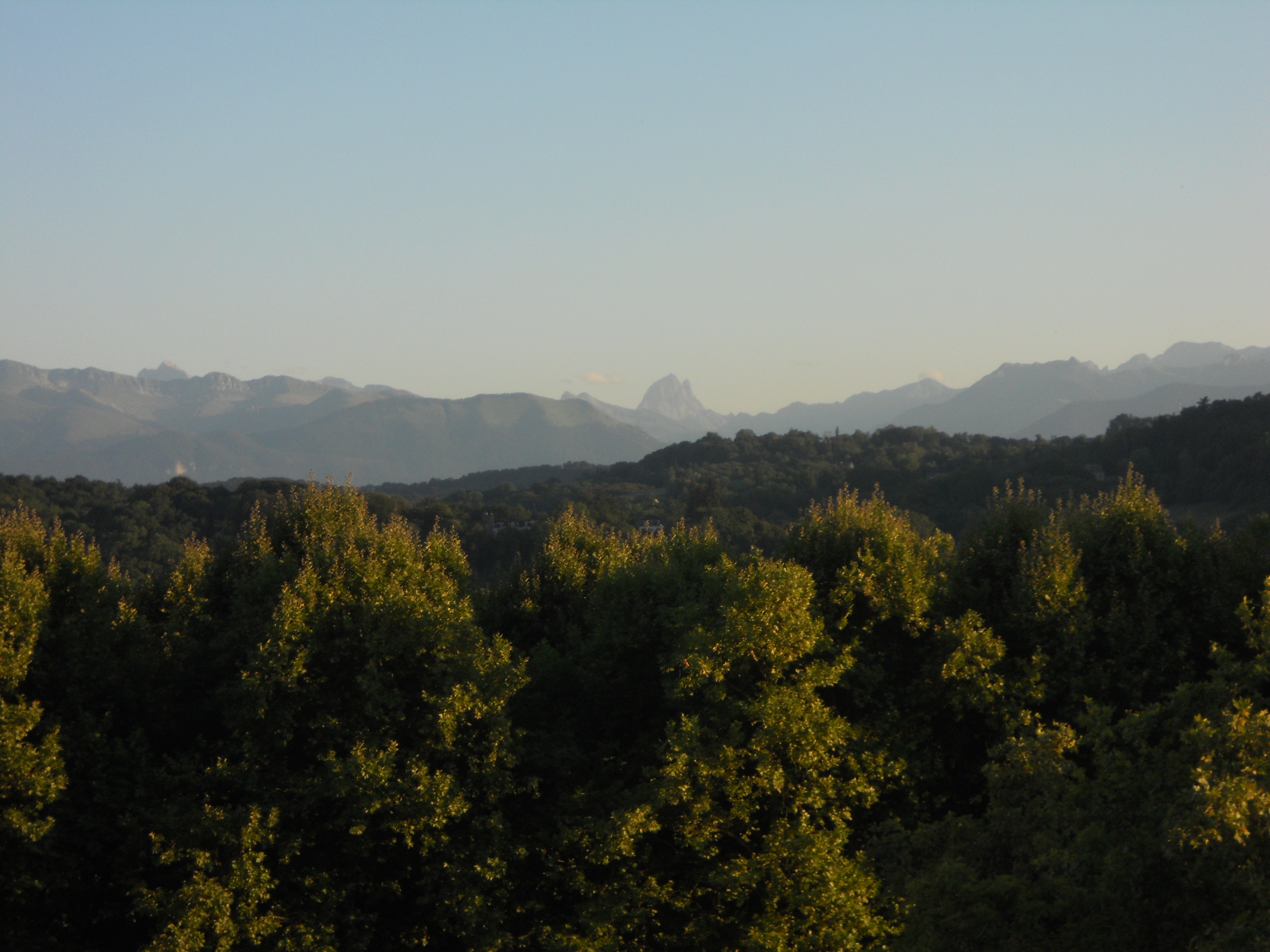
View of the Pyrenees from Pau.

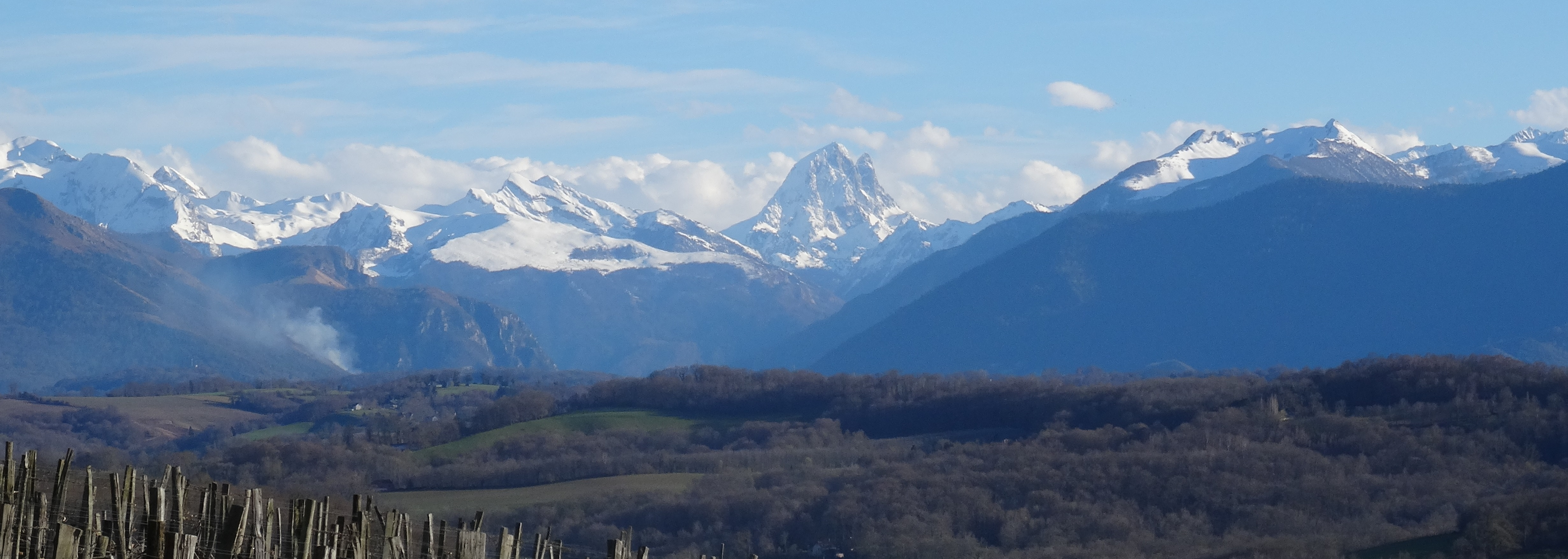
Pic du Midi d'Ossau, emblem of the city and the club

=== Colours ===
Pau FC features the colours yellow, representing the arms of Béarn, and blue, reflecting the Bèth Cèu de Pau present on the arms of the province's capital.

The original colours of the Bleuets de Notre-Dame were blue and white, which the new Pau FC retained for two years following its foundation. However, following René Lanusse's takeover in 1961, the club adopted the blue and yellow colours of the city.

From 1991 to 1995, the new president Alain Pitoun reverted to the original colours of the Bleuets, sky blue and white.

These colours were abandoned in 1995 when Bernard Laporte-Fray took over the club. The club then adopted a predominantly yellow kit, including shirts, shorts, and socks, matching those of the original Football Club de Pau founded by José Bidegain.

Since then, the yellow and blue colours have remained consistent, though the shade of blue has varied from sky blue to darker hues approaching violet.

== Grounds ==
Since 14 September 2018, Pau FC has had its own football-specific stadium, Nouste Camp. With a seating capacity of 3,791 after renovations in 2021, Nouste Camp addresses long-standing infrastructure issues for the club and football in Pau as a whole. Previously, Pau FC shared the Stade du Hameau with the rugby union club Section Paloise, following the abandonment of the Stade de l'Ousse des Bois. This arrangement was detrimental to the club, which struggled to establish a strong presence and unify all its teams on a single site.

=== Previous Stadiums ===
==== Stade de l'Ousse des Bois ====
Pau Football Club has used several stadiums over the years, including the former Stade Pedeutour, located on the banks of the Ousse des Bois river. Renovated in the 1960s and renamed Stade de l'Ousse des Bois, this venue quickly fell into disrepair and became an unfortunate venue for the club. After the club's reformation as Pau Football Club, the team alternated between Stade du Hameau, shared with Section Paloise, and Stade de l'Ousse des Bois during a difficult period following relegation to the amateur league.

==== Stade des Bleuets ====
From 1959 to 1968, FC Pau played its home matches at Stade des Bleuets, also known as Stade de l'Avenue de Buros. Before becoming FC Pau in 1959, the senior team of Bleuets de Notre-Dame already played at this stadium. Stade des Bleuets, which featured two side stands, was inaugurated in 1953 and was quickly renovated for the Coupe de France matches in 1958–59.

==== Stade du Hameau ====
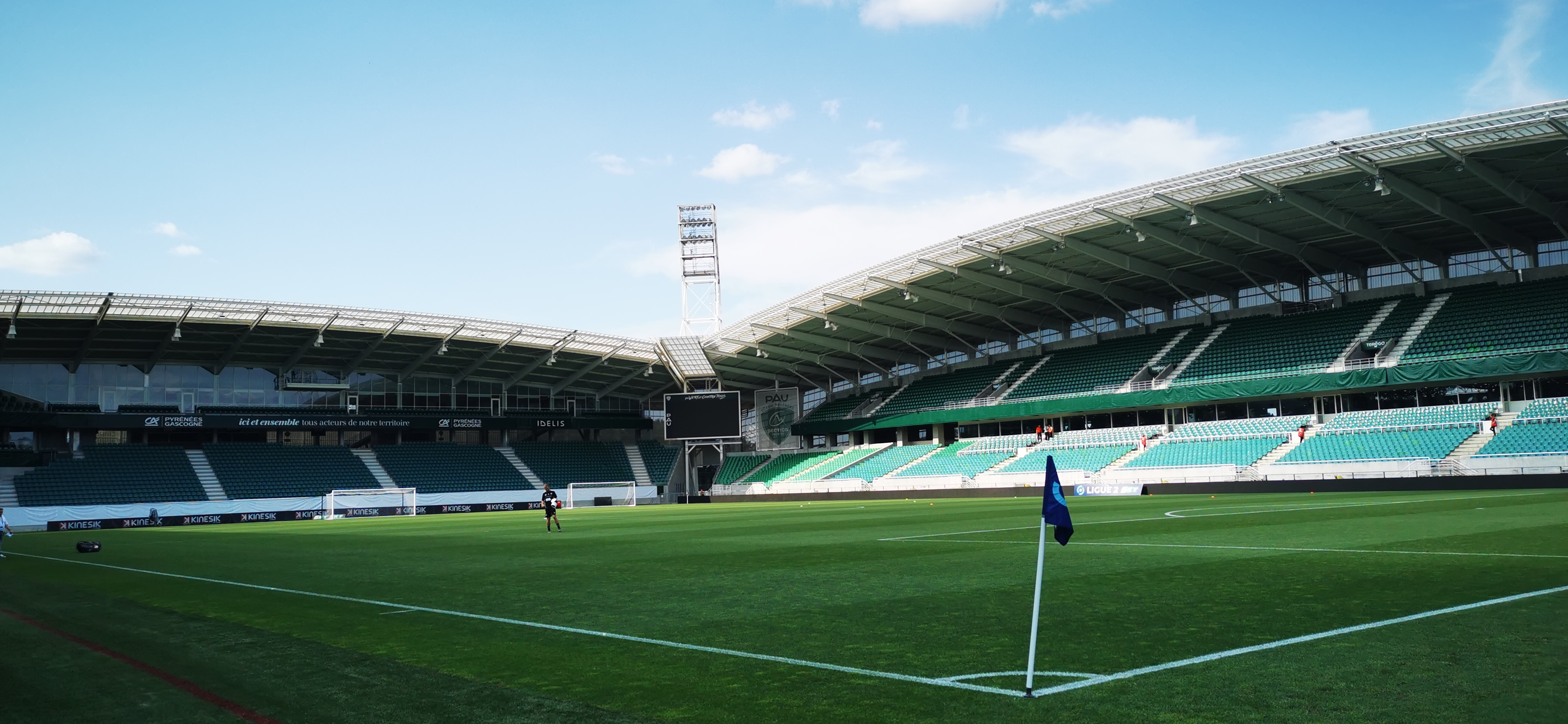
Stade du Hameau in August 2022

The Stade du Hameau is the main stadium in the city of Pau. It replaced the Stade de la Croix-du-Prince and is currently used by Section Paloise. Inaugurated in 1949, it was originally a military stadium. FC Pau was the first club to move there in 1960, but it relocated to Stade de l'Ousse des Bois in 1968.

Since Pau FC's promotion to Ligue 2, the club temporarily played at Stade du Hameau, fully renovated in 2017, while Nouste Camp was being brought up to standard.

==== Stade de la Croix-du-Prince ====
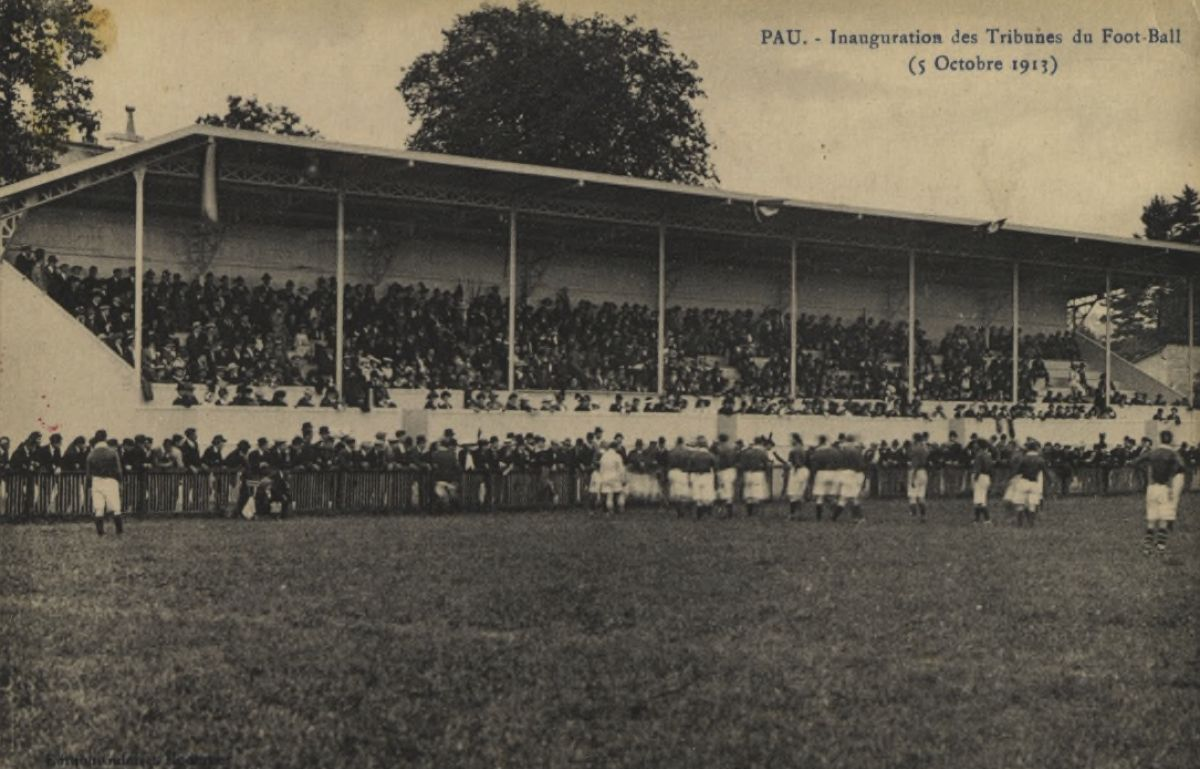
Stade de la Croix-du-Prince in 1913

Stade de la Croix-du-Prince, built in 1910 and inaugurated in 1913, was Pau's iconic rugby stadium.

FC Pau played several matches in this historic stadium, located in the heart of the popular Quartier du 14-Juillet.

Before the decision to build Nouste Camp, a major renovation of Stade de la Croix-du-Prince was the preferred option of President Bernard Laporte-Fray. Despite the famously intense atmosphere of this old stadium, which was favoured by the STUP, renovation costs proved too high. The famous wooden stands were finally demolished in 2019.

== Support ==
Pau FC is one of the prominent football clubs in Southwestern France, with a dedicated local fanbase that has grown significantly since the club's promotion to Ligue 2. The club's most significant attendance records were set at the Stade du Hameau, notably during the 2019–20 Coupe de France run. On 29 January 2020, Pau FC hosted Paris Saint-Germain F.C., drawing a record crowd of 16,707 spectators. This surpassed the previous record of 15,668 spectators set just a few weeks earlier, on 16 January 2020, when the club faced FC Girondins de Bordeaux in the same competition.

At their new home, Nouste Camp, the highest recorded attendance is 3,821 spectators, which was achieved on 2 March 2023 during the Aquitaine Derby against Bordeaux.

== Ownership and finances ==
Person / People	Associated company	Shares	Ref.
Bernard Laporte-Fray	S.A.S. Pau Football Club	100%	

== Players ==
=== First-team squad ===
As of 7 September 2026

Note: Flags indicate national team as defined under FIFA eligibility rules; some limited exceptions apply. Players may hold more than one non-FIFA nationality.

No.	Pos.	Nation	Player
1	GK	FRA	Brice Maubleu
2	DF	FRA	Tom Pouilly
4	DF	FRA	Axel Dodote (on loan from Saint-Étienne)
5	MF	FRA	Lorenzo Rajot
6	MF	SEN	Cheikh Fall
7	FW	ALG	Hacène Benali
8	DF	SEN	Souleymane Basse
9	FW	FRA	Babacar Leye
11	FW	FRA	Alexis Lefebvre
14	FW	GAB	Royce Openda
16	GK	FRA	Maxime Adam
17	MF	FRA	Bilal Brahimi (on loan from Viborg)
18	FW	MTQ	Jérémy Sebas (on loan from Bastia)

No.	Pos.	Nation	Player
19	FW	FRA	Tom Saettel
21	MF	FRA	Jessy Benet
22	DF	CMR	Rony Mimb Baheng
23	DF	FRA	Anthony Briançon
25	MF	FRA	Quentin Daubin
27	MF	FRA	Luan Gadegbeku (on loan from Saint-Étienne)
29	DF	FRA	Gaëtan Paquiez
30	GK	FRA	Esteban Salles
39	DF	MAR	Mathys Tourraine
56	FW	SEN	Abdoulaye Mbaye
88	DF	CIV	Axel Bamba
90	MF	FRA	Kyllian Gasnier
97	DF	COM	Akim Abdallah

=== Out on loan ===
Note: Flags indicate national team as defined under FIFA eligibility rules; some limited exceptions apply. Players may hold more than one non-FIFA nationality.

No.	Pos.	Nation	Player
—	MF	FRA	Tom Gomes (at Bourg-Péronnas until 30 June 2027)

== Coaching staff ==
As of 7 August 2024

=== First team ===
Name	Role
(France) Thierry Debès	Head Coach
(France) Thibault Giresse (France) Nicolas Piresse	Assistant Coach
(France) Anthony Babikian	Goalkeeping Coach
(France) Pierre Lamugue	Fitness coach
(France) Yann Valeau	Video analyst
(France) Gérard Battlès	Head of Recruitment

=== Pau B ===
Name	Role
(France) Bruno Rohart	Head Coach
(France) Nicolas Piresse	Player Development Manager
(France) Paul Étienne	Assistant Coach
(France) Anthony Babikian	Goalkeeping Coach
(France) Nicolas Oliva (France) Esteban Casas Aguilar	Fitness coach
(France) Thomas Vialla	Video analyst

=== Coaching history ===
Dates	Name	Notes
1959–1961	(Hungary) Bela Herczeg	
1961–1963	(France) Guy Paternotte	
1963–1969	(France) Joseph Lopez	
1971–1973	(France) Jacky Cornuel	
1973–1975	(France) René Lanusse	
1976–1980	(France) Jean-Pierre Altuzarra	
1980–1981	(France) Jacques Foix	
1981–1990	(France) Paul Escudé	
1990–1991	(France) Robert Péré-Escamps / (France) Marc Lévy	
1990–1991	(France) Jean Gallice	
1991–1992	(France) Paul Escudé	
1992–1995	(Serbia) Slavoljub Muslin	
1996–1997	(France) René Girard	
1998–1999	(France) Pascal Plancque	
1999–2002	(France) Joël Lopez	
2002–2003	(France) William Dymant	
2003–2004	(France) Jean-Marc Ferratge	
2004–2006	(France) Marc Lévy	
2006–2007	(France) Jean-Luc Girard	
2007–2010	(France) David Vignes	
2010–2010	(France) Jacques-Olivier Paviot	
2011–2012	(France) Robert Buigues	
2012–2014	(France) Laurent Strzelczak	
2014–2018	(France) David Vignes	
2018–2019	(Italy) Raffaele Novelli	
2019–2020	(France) Bruno Irles	
2020–2023	(France) Didier Tholot	
2023–2026	(France) Nicolas Usaï	
2023–	(France) Thierry Debès	

== Management ==
As of 7 August 2024

Name	Role
(France) Bernard Laporte-Fray	Owner
(France) Yann Laporte-Fray	Chairman
(France) Luis de Sousa	Director of Football
(France) Maryse Fréchou	Club Secretary

== Rivalries ==
Pau FC's main rivals are Aviron Bayonnais FC, Tarbes Pyrénées Football and Stade Montois. In the past this fixture has been marred by crowd violence. However, these rivalries have waned over time due to the sporting decline of these clubs and the rise of Pau FC.

In the 2020s, a sporting rivalry has emerged with FC Girondins de Bordeaux, with local media now referring to this fixture as the Aquitaine Derby.

Despite the cultural proximity to Spanish clubs across the border in Aragon, Navarre, or the Basque Country, no significant sporting rivalries have developed.

== International links ==
In 2021, Bernard Laporte-Fray, together with Dado Pršo, acquired Demba Diop FC, a second-division club in Senegal, located in M'Bour.

Pau FC and SD Huesca announced in 2023 the signing of a collaboration agreement aimed at sharing expertise in club development, and the creation of a Pyrenees Cup.
