= Ramesh Kumar Nibhoria =

Ramesh Nibhoria
- Occupation: Engineer
- Known for: Biomass fuels and stoves
- Website: Company website

Ramesh Nibhoria is an Indian Punjabi engineer and entrepreneur, and creator of biomass pellet fueled cook stove.

== Business ==
After completing Chandigarh College of Engineering and Technology, Nibhoria worked in various shop floor jobs and eventually reached executive level mechanical engineering positions.

In February 1996, after 12 years in the engineering field, Nibhoria started Ess Aar Energies with the assistance of the Technology Information, Forecasting and Assessment Council (TIFAC), an autonomous organisation under the Department of Science and Technology (India). Located near Chandigarh, the company manufactured biomass briquettes from agricultural and forest residues. This project was India's first biomass pelletizing plant.

In 2000 he started manufacturing Sanjha Chulha (Earth Stoves), a biomass briquette fired community kitchen stove, to negate the need for liquefied petroleum gas (LPG). Stoves were installed at Jawahar Navodaya Vidyalaya Schools at Himachal, Punjab and Chandigarh. The users save 50% while replacing LPG with biomass briquette cooking. This invention won a Petroleum Conservation Research Association award. This project was supported by TePP (the Technopreneur Promotion Program, run by the Ministry of Science and Technology, Government of India). He invented many bioenergy technologies and till August, 2018 he applied 13 patents.

He established Nishant Bioenergy Consultancy and Nishant Bioenergy (P) Limited. Company has proprietary technologies of pellet cook stoves, burners and biomass pellet manufacturing and establishes franchisees. Till 2018, 21 franchisees were operational. https://twitter.com/nibhoria

In the year 2022, he developed very innovative high temperature continuous Pyrolyser for making biochar or torrefied biomass and applied patent for same. Technology is developed in collaboration with NETRA, NTPC. His startup LWP BIOCOAL llp (www.nishantbiocoal.com), established India's first Rice Straw based torrefied pellet plant in Punjab state. As on February, 2025 he is executing 5 projects having total capacity 300 Ton Per Day capacity.

== Awards ==
His efforts won him an Ashden Award in 2005, which was given by HRH Prince Charles. In 2006, the UN Human Settlement Programme, Kenya judged his project as promising practices. He is a fellow of Global Social Benefiting Incubator (GSBI), 2007 (2013). GSBI is run by the University of Santa Clara, San Jose, California. In 2006 he was invited to Skoll World Forum, Oxford. He was invited to the Al Gore lecture on climate change at Cambridge University. In the year 2016 his projects won WAF Award. He was also shortlisted as semifinalist at Global Clean Tech Innovation Programme (GCIP) in the year 2016

== Sources ==
- "Carbon-offsetting: All credit to them". The Independent. 4 January 2007. Archived from the original on 20 December 2008.
- Rao, A. S. (10 January 2007). "Corporate Innovations: Lessons from India". SSRN 1087953.
