= Lacq =

- Commune
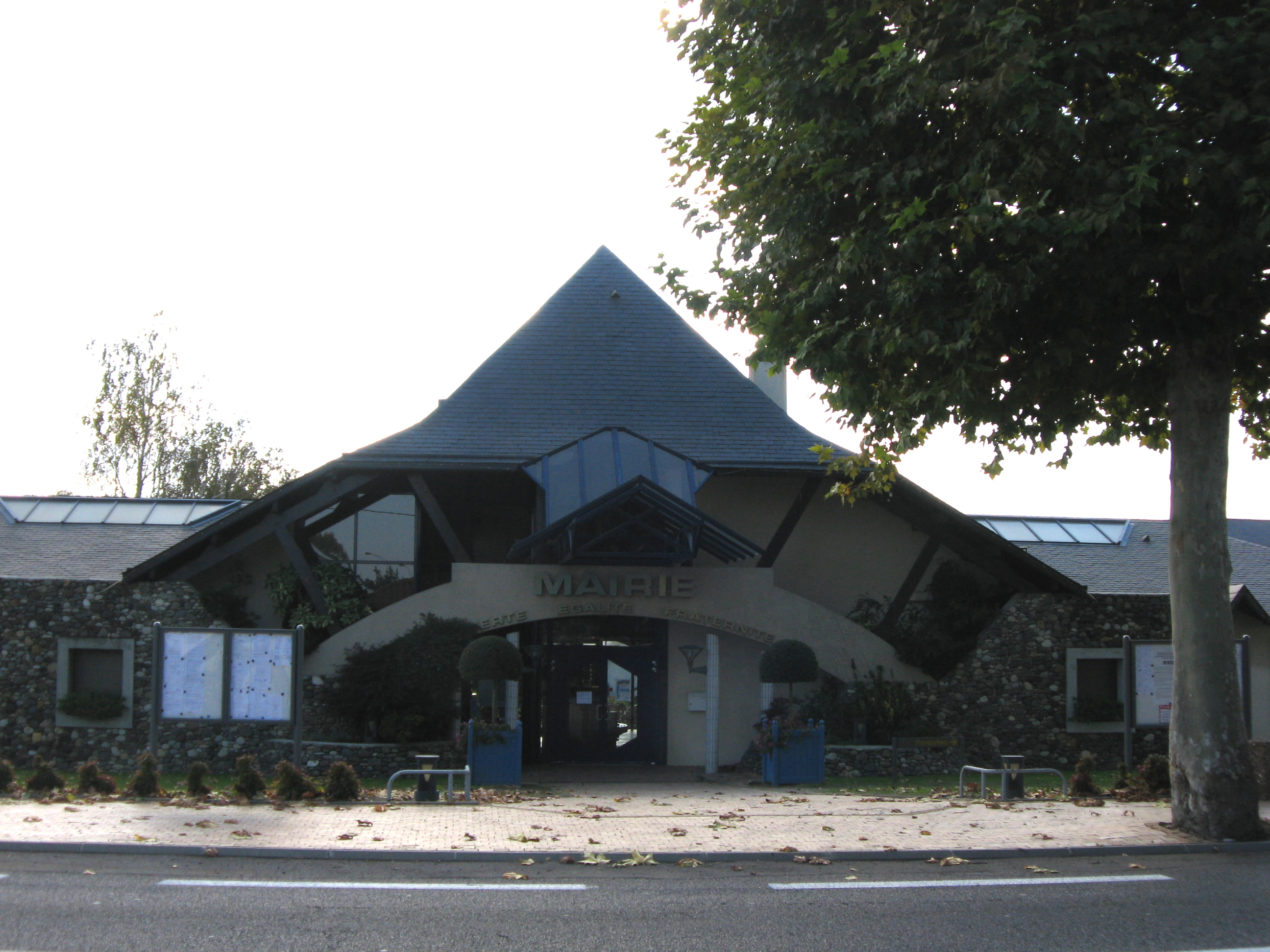
- The town hall of Lacq
- Location of Lacq
- Location within France Location within Nouvelle-Aquitaine
- Coordinates: 43°24′49″N 0°37′03″W
- Country: France
- Region: Nouvelle-Aquitaine
- Department: Pyrénées-Atlantiques
- Arrondissement: Pau
- Canton: Artix et Pays de Soubestre
- Intercommunality: Lacq-Orthez

Government
  - Mayor (2024–2026): Didier Rey
- Area^{1}: 22.94 km^{2} (8.86 sq mi)
- Elevation: 95 m (312 ft)
- Highest elevation: 190 m (620 ft)
- Lowest elevation: 88 m (289 ft)
- Population (2023): 1,036
  - Density: 45.16/km^{2} (117.0/sq mi)
- Time zone: UTC+01:00 (CET)
  - Summer (DST): UTC+02:00 (CEST)
- INSEE/Postal code: 64300 /64170
- ^{1} French Land Register data, which excludes lakes, ponds, glaciers > 1 km^{2} (0.386 sq mi or 247 acres) and river estuaries.

Lacq (French pronunciation: [lak]; Occitan: Lac) is a commune in the Pyrénées-Atlantiques department in southwestern France. On 1 January 2024, the former commune of Urdès was merged into Lacq.

It lies just northwest of the prefecture (department capital) Pau.

== Economy ==
In modern times the local economy has been based on the industrial use of subsurface petroleum reserves, and since 1951 on the extraction and development of a very large natural gas reservoir underneath the city. Processing of the large quantities of hydrogen sulfide in the gas have made Lacq a center of sulfur production.

== See also ==
- Communes of the Pyrénées-Atlantiques department
