= Uzos =

- Commune
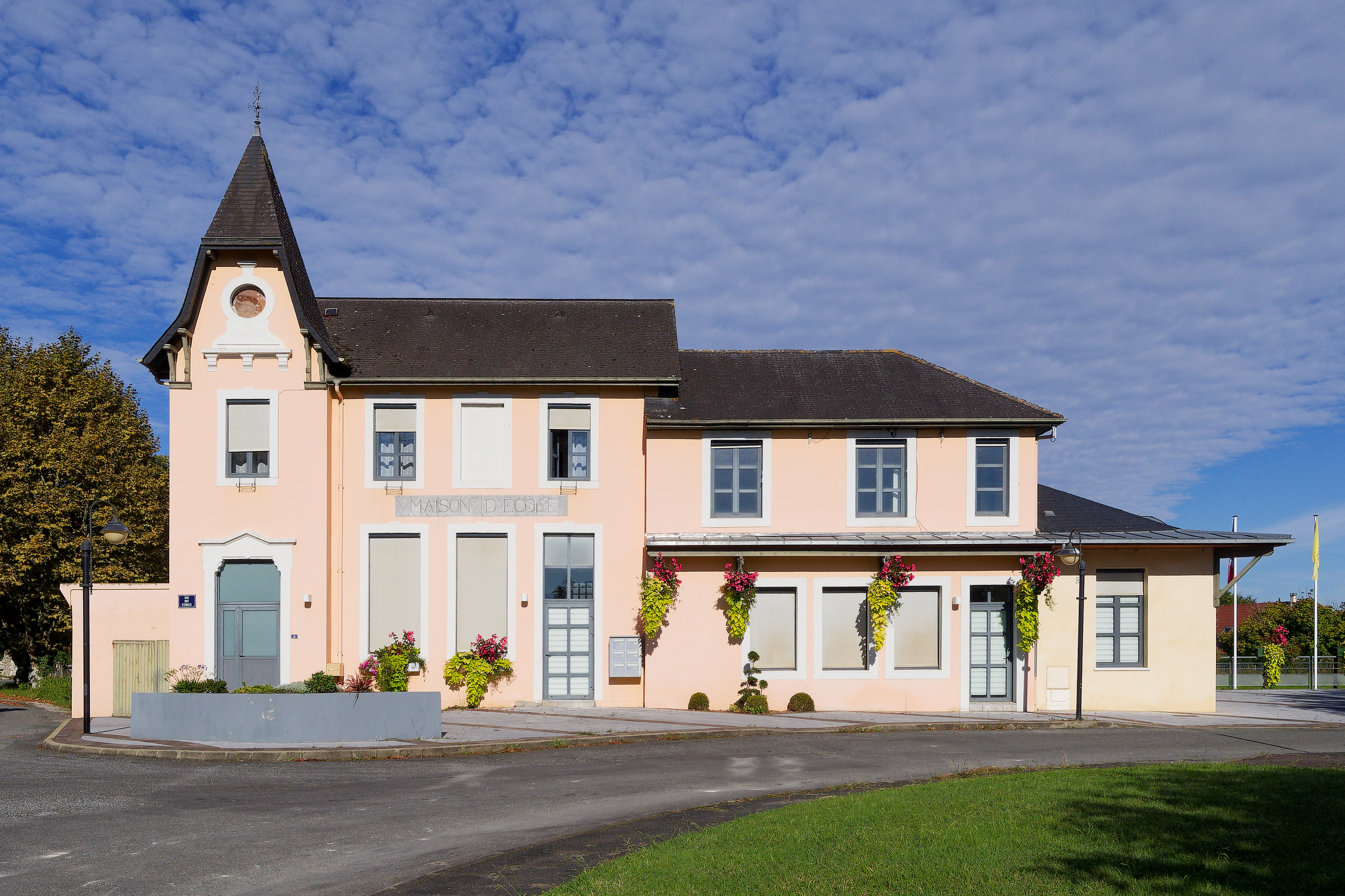
- Uzos Town hall
- Location of Uzos
- Location within France Location within Nouvelle-Aquitaine
- Coordinates: 43°16′12″N 0°20′33″W
- Country: France
- Region: Nouvelle-Aquitaine
- Department: Pyrénées-Atlantiques
- Arrondissement: Pau
- Canton: Ouzom, Gave et Rives du Neez
- Intercommunality: CA Pau Béarn Pyrénées

Government
  - Mayor (2024–2026): Marie-Hélène Jouanine
- Area^{1}: 3.52 km^{2} (1.36 sq mi)
- Elevation: 210 m (690 ft)
- Highest elevation: 342 m (1,122 ft)
- Lowest elevation: 182 m (597 ft)
- Population (2023): 874
  - Density: 248/km^{2} (643/sq mi)
- Time zone: UTC+01:00 (CET)
  - Summer (DST): UTC+02:00 (CEST)
- INSEE/Postal code: 64550 /64110
- ^{1} French Land Register data, which excludes lakes, ponds, glaciers > 1 km^{2} (0.386 sq mi or 247 acres) and river estuaries.

Uzos (French pronunciation: [yzɔs]; Occitan: Usòs) is a commune in the Pyrénées-Atlantiques department in south-western France.

== See also ==
- Communes of the Pyrénées-Atlantiques department
