= Wellington (footballer, born June 1982) =

Brazilian footballer (born 1982)

Personal information
- Full name: Wellington Dantas de Jesus
- Date of birth: 9 June 1982 (age 44)
- Place of birth: Itabuna, Brazil
- Height: 1.73 m (5 ft 8 in)
- Position: Midfielder

Senior career*
| Years | Team | Apps | (Gls) |
| 2001–2006 | Atlético Mineiro | | |
| 2004–2005 | → Aalborg (loan) | 3 | (0) |
| 2005–2006 | → Estrela do Norte (loan) | | |
| 2006–2009 | L'Entente SSG | 79 | (21) |
| 2009 | KAC Kénitra | | |
| 2009–2010 | Al-Ittihad Kalba | | |
| 2010–2011 | Red Star Saint-Ouen | 16 | (3) |
| 2011–2012 | Al-Sailiya | | |
| 2012 | Yverdon | | |
| 2013–2014 | Lusitanos Saint-Maur | | |
| 2015–2016 | Boulogne-Billancourt | 4 | (0) |
- * Club domestic league appearances and goals

Wellington Dantas de Jesus (born 9 June 1982) is a Brazilian former professional footballer who played as a midfielder.

== Career ==
Born in Itabuna, Wellington started his career at Atlético Mineiro. He signed a five-year contract in June 2001. He moved to Aalborg Boldspilklub in summer 2004. He then returned to Brazil for Estrela do Norte. In summer 2007, he left for Sannois Saint-Gratien in Championnat National.
