= Maurice Plantier =

French politician

Maurice Plantier (29 January 1921 – 25 January 2006) was a French politician. He represented the Rally of Republican Lefts (RGR) (1956), the National Centre of Independents and Peasants (CNIP) (from 1956 to 1958), the Union for the New Republic (UNR) (from 1958 to 1962), the Union of Democrats for the Republic (UDR) (from 1973 to 1976) and the Rally for the Republic (RPR) (from 1976 to 1978) in the National Assembly.
