= Paul Escudé =

Franch footballer (1950–1998)

Personal information
- Date of birth: 22 June 1950
- Place of birth: Safi, Morocco
- Date of death: 27 December 1998 (aged 48)
- Place of death: Pau, France
- Position: Winger

Senior career*
Years	Team	Apps	(Gls)
1966–1969	FC Pau		
1969–1971	Bordeaux B		
1971–1980	VS Chartres		
1982–1984	FC Pau		

International career
- France juniors

Managerial career
- 1980–1990: FC Pau
- 1991–1992: FC Pau
- * Club domestic league appearances and goals

Paul Escudé (French pronunciation: [pɔl ɛ.sky.de]; 22 June 1950 – 27 December 1998) was a French football player and manager known for being in charge of Pau for more than 10 years and for leading the team to national prominence.

He was the father of former footballer Julien Escudé and former tennis player Nicolas Escudé.

== Biography ==
Escudé was born in Safi, Morocco. He made his first-team debut for FC Pau at the age of 16, playing as a winger, and represented France at junior level.

In 1969, he signed with Bordeaux, where he played until 1971. During an international tour in North Africa, he sustained a serious knee injury that significantly limited his playing career. After leaving Bordeaux, he spent more than a decade with VS Chartres before returning to FC Pau as player/manager in the third division.

Following his retirement as a player, Escudé became head coach of FC Pau. He managed the club from 1983 to 1990. Despite limited financial resources and infrastructure, he played a key role in structuring the club.

At the end of the 1989–90 season, Escudé left his position following the arrival of new club management. On 15 July 1991, FC Pau president Alain Pitoun reappointed him as head coach, making Escudé the manager with the longest tenure in the club’s history.

Escudé died on 27 December 1998 in Pau.

== Legacy ==
A football ground in Pau is named the Stade Paul Escudé. It was inaugurated in 2010 by his sons Julien and Nicolas.
