= Marc Lévy (footballer) =

French footballer (born 1961)

Personal information
- Date of birth: 7 August 1961 (age 65)
- Place of birth: Algiers, French Algeria
- Height: 1.87 m (6 ft 2 in)
- Position: Goalkeeper

Youth career
- 1969–1976: Sainte Marguerite
- 1976–1980: Marseille

Senior career*
Years	Team	Apps	(Gls)
1980–1986	Marseille	146	(0)
1986–1989	Meaux		
1989–1991	Pau		

Managerial career
- 1992–1993: Montauban
- 1994–2004: Marseille (Goalkeeping coach)
- 2004–2006: Pau
- 2012–: Shanghai Shenhua(Goalkeeping coach)
- * Club domestic league appearances and goals

Marc Lévy (born 7 August 1961 in Algiers) is a French former professional football goalkeeper who played for Marseille, Meaux and Pau.

He coached Montauban, Marseille and Pau.
