= Joël Lopez (footballer, born 1960) =

French footballer

Personal information
- Full name: Joël Lopez
- Date of birth: 30 October 1960 (age 65)
- Place of birth: Aressy, France
- Position: Midfielder

Youth career
- Jeanne d'Arc

Senior career*
Years	Team	Apps	(Gls)
1979–1982	Pau		
1982–1983	Châteauroux		
1983–1984	Pau		
1984–1985	Bordeaux		
1985–1986	Mulhouse		
1986–1987	Thonon		
1987–1992	Pau		

Managerial career
- 1999–2002: Pau
- * Club domestic league appearances and goals

Joël Lopez (born 30 October 1960) is a French former footballer who played as a midfielder.

== Playing career ==
Lopez, who played for Jeanne d'Arc at youth level, started his senior career with Pau in 1979, remaining until 1982 when he agreed to join Division 2 outfit Châteauroux. Lopez completed a return to Pau a year later, prior to signing for Division 1 side Bordeaux. The club won the title in his sole season there, qualifying for the 1985–86 European Cup. However, Lopez departed Bordeaux at the beginning of 1985–86 to play in Division 2 for Mulhouse. His stay lasted twelve months, preceding a period with Thonon between 1986 and 1987. In the latter year, Lopez rejoined former team Pau for a third time. Five years later, he retired from football.

== Non-playing career ==
In 2005, Lopez became president of Pau; having previously been a coach and the team's manager between 1999 and 2002. He served for five years, before deciding not to continue his mandate. December 2013 saw Lopez become acting president of Évian Thonon Gaillard; he was previously Évian's sporting director which followed a period working in recruitment. Lopez, along with Julian and Pascal Dupraz, were summoned to court following allegations of fraud and forgery in 2015, when Lopez was dismissed by the club. In 2017, Lopez and Pascal Dupraz were charged and fined €10,000; with Julian Dupraz being cleared. Lopez later returned to Pau as vice-president.
