= Pau, Pyrénées-Atlantiques =

Pau
- Prefecture and commune
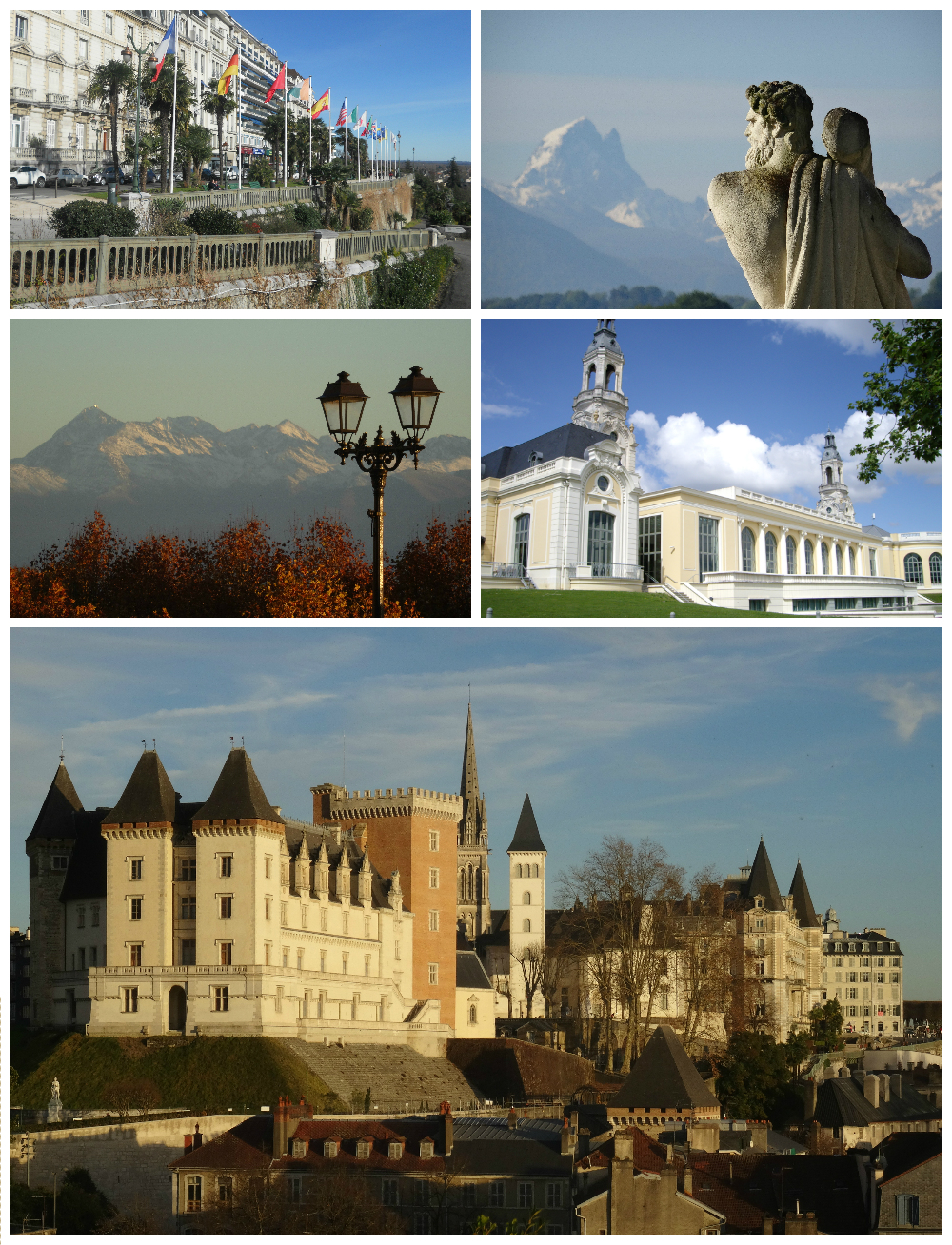
- From top, left to right: the Boulevard des Pyrénées and the Pic du Midi d'Ossau; Pic du Midi de Bigorre and Palais Beaumont; Château de Pau

- Coat of arms
- Location of Pau
- Location within France Location within Nouvelle-Aquitaine
- Coordinates: 43°18′N 0°22′W
- Country: France
- Region: Nouvelle-Aquitaine
- Department: Pyrénées-Atlantiques
- Arrondissement: Pau
- Canton: Pau-1, 2, 3 and 4
- Intercommunality: CA Pau Béarn Pyrénées

Government
  - Mayor (2026–32): Jérôme Marbot
- Area^{1}: 31.51 km^{2} (12.17 sq mi)
- Elevation: 178 m (584 ft)
- Highest elevation: 245 m (804 ft)
- Lowest elevation: 165 m (541 ft)
- Population (2023): 80,441
  - Density: 2,553/km^{2} (6,612/sq mi)
- Demonym(s): Palois, paloise (French); Paulin, paulina Paulès, paulèsa (Béarnese)
- Time zone: UTC+01:00 (CET)
  - Summer (DST): UTC+02:00 (CEST)
- INSEE/Postal code: 64445 /64000
- ^{1} French Land Register data, which excludes lakes, ponds, glaciers > 1 km^{2} (0.386 sq mi or 247 acres) and river estuaries.

Pau (/poʊ/; French: [po]; Occitan: [paw]; Basque: Paue) is a commune overlooking the Pyrenees, the prefecture of the Pyrénées-Atlantiques department in the Nouvelle-Aquitaine region of Southwestern France.

The city is located in the heart of the former sovereign principality of Béarn, of which it was the capital from 1464. Pau lies on the Gave de Pau, and is located 100 kilometres (62 mi) from the Atlantic Ocean and 50 kilometres (31 mi) from Spain. This position gives it a striking panorama across the mountain range of the Pyrenees, especially from its landmark Boulevard des Pyrénées, as well as the hillsides of Jurançon. According to Alphonse de Lamartine, "Pau has the world's most beautiful view of the earth just as Naples has the most beautiful view of the sea."

The site has been occupied since at least the Gallo-Roman era. (Note: "...of remains have been discovered in 1850 on the outskirts of the area ... the remains of an important building, villa or baths...") However the first references to Pau as a settlement only occur in the first half of the 12th century. (Note: "...in an Act passed during the episcopate of Gui de Lons...") The town developed from the construction of its castle, likely from the 11th century by the Viscounts of Béarn, to protect the ford which was a strategic point providing access to the Bearn valleys and to Spain. The city takes its name from the stockade (pau in Béarnese) which surrounded the original castle.

Pau became the capital of Béarn in 1464 and the seat of the Kings of Navarre in 1512 after the capture of Pamplona by the Kingdom of Castile. Pau became a leading political and intellectual centre under the reign of Henry d'Albret. With the end of Béarnaise independence in 1620, Pau lost its influence but remained at the head of a largely autonomous province. It was home to the Parliament of Navarre and Béarn during the Revolution, when it was dismantled to create the Department of Basses-Pyrénées. The Belle Époque marked a resurgence for the Béarnaise capital with a massive influx of wealthy foreign tourists, who came to spend the winter to take advantage of the benefits of Pau's climate. It was at this time that Pau became one of the world capitals of the nascent aerospace industry under the influence of the Wright brothers.

With the decline of tourism during the 20th century, Pau's economy gradually shifted towards the aviation industry and then to petrochemicals with the discovery of the Lacq gas field in 1951. The Université de Pau et des Pays de l'Adour, founded in 1972, accounts for a large student population. The city plays a leading role for Béarn but also for a wide segment of the Adour area. Pau's heritage extends over several centuries, its diversity and its quality allowed it to obtain the label of City of Art and History in 2011.

The name of its people is Palois in French, and paulin in Occitan. The motto of Pau is in Latin: Urbis palladium et gentis ("Protective of the city and its people").

== Geography ==
=== Location ===
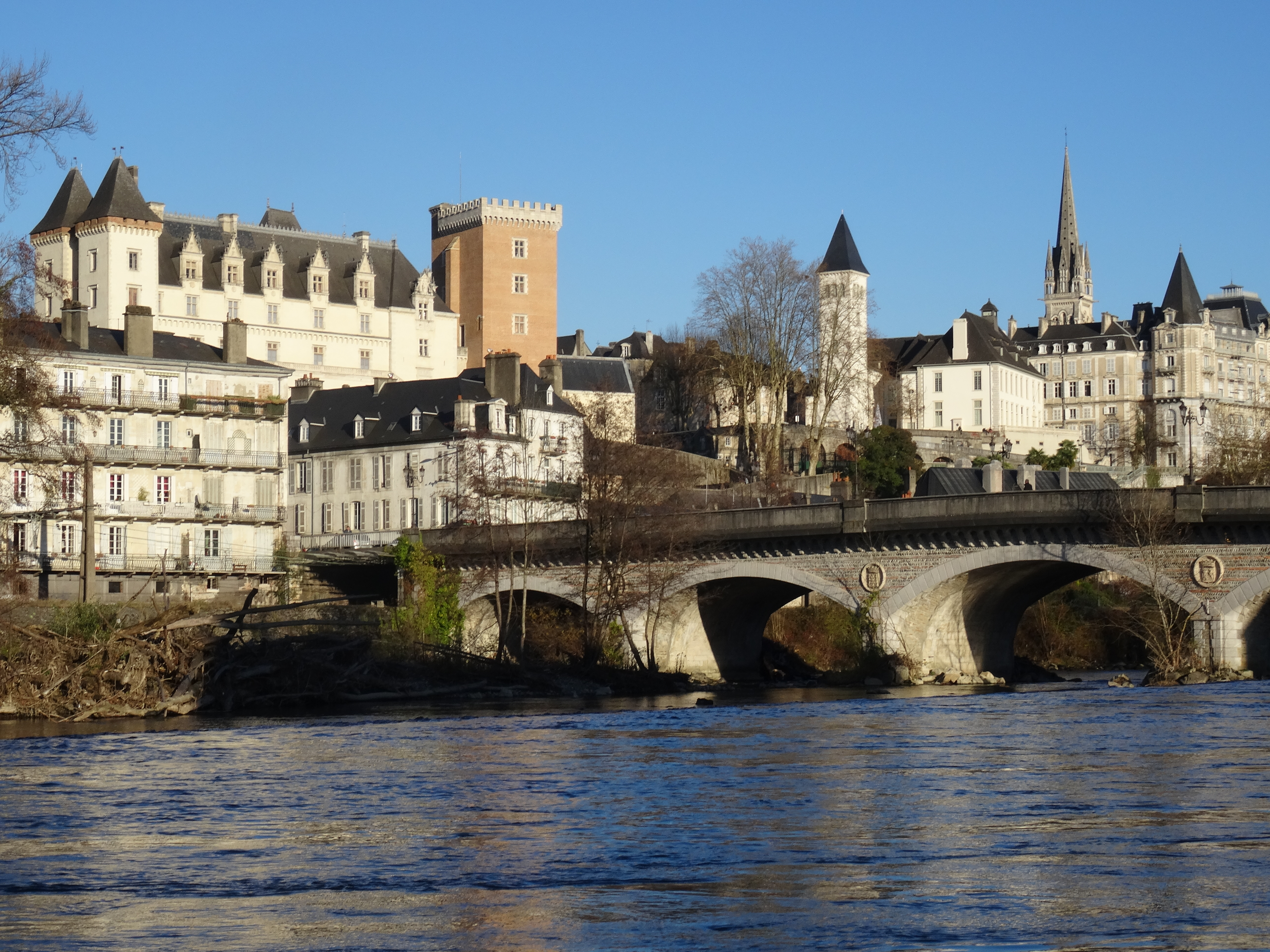
The château and the Pont du XIV-juillet [14 July Bridge] seen from the banks of the Gave de Pau

Pau is 100 kilometres (62 miles) from the Atlantic Ocean and 50 km (31 miles) from the border with Spain on the Pyrenees. The frontier is crossed by the col du Somport (1,631 metres (5,351 feet)) and the col du Pourtalet (1,794 m (5,886 ft)). Access to the crossings partly accounts for Pau's strategic importance.

Pau is located 200 km (124 mi) west of Toulouse, 30 km (19 mi) from Tarbes and Lourdes, 25 km (16 mi) from Oloron. The conglomeration of Bayonne-Anglet-Biarritz is at 110 km (68 mi), Bordeaux 190 km (118 mi).

=== Communal boundaries ===
- To the north: Buros, Montardon and Morlaàs
- To the east: Bizanos and Idron
- To the south: Gelos and Jurançon
- To the west: Lons and Billère

=== Hydrography ===
The city, located at an average altitude of 200 metres (660 ft), is crossed by the Gave de Pau, where a ford gave passage to the Pyrenees. Gave is the name given to a torrent in the Pyrenees. The Gave de Pau, which becomes a torrent when mountain snow melts, takes its source in the Cirque de Gavarnie and is the main tributary of the Adour, into which it empties after 175 kilometres (109 mi). The crossing was used for pasturage for sheep in the high meadows. The old route is now a hiking path, GR 65, that runs 60 km (37 mi) south to the border.

The lands of the commune are also watered by the Luy de Béarn, a tributary the Luy, and by its tributaries, the Aïgue Longue and the Uzan, as well as the Soust, the Herrère, the Ousse and the Ousse des Bois, tributaries of the Gave de Pau. The Aygue Longue is in turn joined the territory of Pau by the Bruscos and the Lata streams, just as the Ousse is joined by the Merdé stream. The Lau Creek that feeds the Canal du Moulin, meanwhile is also present in the municipality.

=== Climate ===
Pau features wet mild winters, with warm, mild summers that are drier. Its geographical location, not far from the Pyrenees, gives the city a contrasting, warm oceanic climate. Temperatures colder than −10 °C (14.0 °F) are rare and those below −15 °C (5.0 °F) are exceptional. Temperatures reached lows of −15 °C (5.0 °F) in February 1956 and −17.5 °C (0.5 °F) in January 1985. Snow falls about 3 days per year (0.45 metres (18 in) in 1987), from November to March.

In summer, the maximum temperatures are of the order of 20 to 30 °C (68.0 to 86.0 °F), temperatures above 35 °C (95.0 °F) are often reached during summer heat waves. During some days of winter, the foehn, a warm wind, can raise the temperature over 20 °C (68.0 °F). As soon as the wind stops, snow can fall.

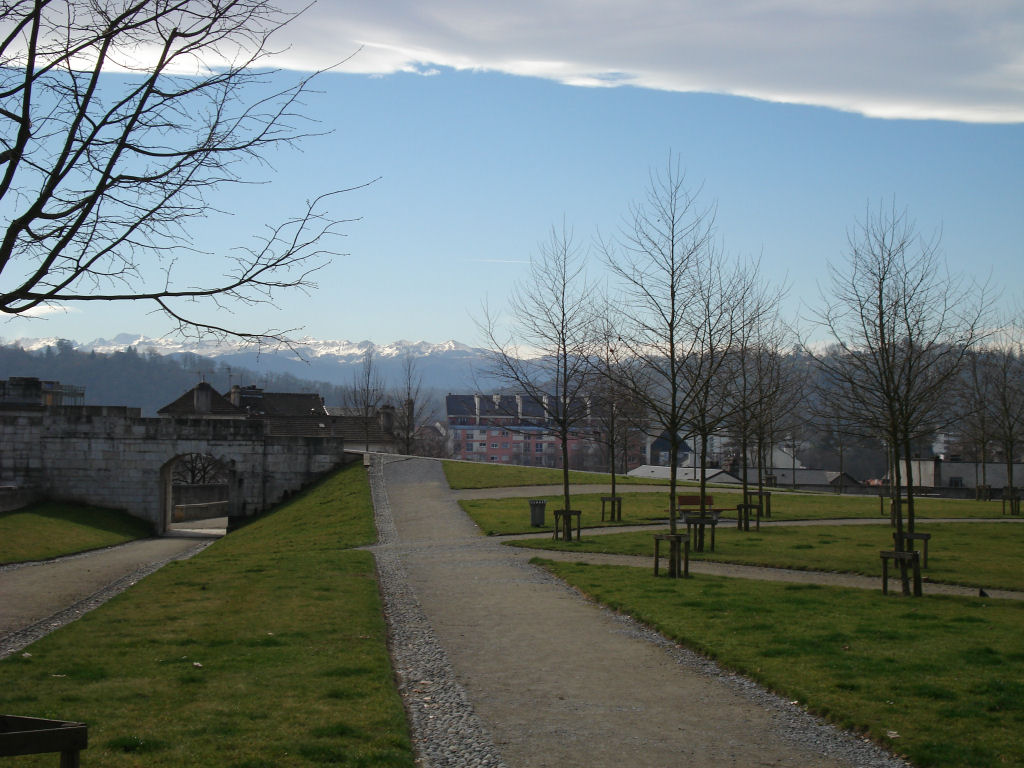
Foehn wind in Pau, February 2007

Rainfall is high, of the order of 1,100 millimetres (43 in) per year (compared to 650 millimetres (26 in) in Paris, 900 millimetres (35 in) in Bordeaux, and 650 millimetres (26 in) in Toulouse). Sunshine averages around 1850 hours per year, or a little less than its neighbour of the Hautes-Pyrénées, Tarbes, which averages 1940 hours of sunshine per year. Fog is infrequent and does not persist much beyond noon. The lack of wind especially characterizes the climate of the Pau region. Strong winds are very rare, in general, winds are very low or zero.

This climate has helped Pau to become, at the end of the 19th century, a winter resort spot popular with the English, Russian and Brazilian bourgeoisie. In 1842 a British doctor, Alexander Taylor, attributed healing 'sedative' virtues to the Pau climate.

This mild and rather wet climate, is also an enhancement to the gardens, parks and public spaces of the city, and for plants from more exotic regions such as Chinese windmill palm (Trachycarpus fortunei), originating in the Chinese mountains, but also for giant sequoias (Sequoiadendron giganteum) and laurel magnolia (Magnolia grandiflora) of American origin.

Comparison of local Meteorological data with other cities in France
Town	Sunshine (hours/yr)	Rain (mm/yr)	Snow (days/yr)	Storm (days/yr)	Fog (days/yr)
National average	1,973	770	14	22	40
Pau	1,880	1,068.8	5.1	26.1	34.5
Paris	1,661	637	12	18	10
Nice	2,724	767	1	29	1
Strasbourg	1,693	665	29	29	56
Brest	1,605	1,211	7	12	75

Climate data for Pau, Pyrénées-Atlantiques (1991–2020 averages, extremes 1921–present)
Month	Jan	Feb	Mar	Apr	May	Jun	Jul	Aug	Sep	Oct	Nov	Dec	Year
Record high °C (°F)	24.5 (76.1)	27.8 (82.0)	31.0 (87.8)	32.0 (89.6)	34.6 (94.3)	39.4 (102.9)	39.2 (102.6)	39.9 (103.8)	38.9 (102.0)	34.0 (93.2)	27.1 (80.8)	27.2 (81.0)	39.9 (103.8)
Mean daily maximum °C (°F)	11.2 (52.2)	12.3 (54.1)	15.5 (59.9)	17.5 (63.5)	21.0 (69.8)	24.1 (75.4)	25.9 (78.6)	26.5 (79.7)	23.9 (75.0)	20.1 (68.2)	14.5 (58.1)	12.0 (53.6)	18.7 (65.7)
Daily mean °C (°F)	6.8 (44.2)	7.4 (45.3)	10.3 (50.5)	12.5 (54.5)	16.0 (60.8)	19.1 (66.4)	20.9 (69.6)	21.1 (70.0)	18.3 (64.9)	15.0 (59.0)	10.0 (50.0)	7.5 (45.5)	13.7 (56.7)
Mean daily minimum °C (°F)	2.4 (36.3)	2.5 (36.5)	5.0 (41.0)	7.4 (45.3)	11.0 (51.8)	14.1 (57.4)	15.8 (60.4)	15.7 (60.3)	12.8 (55.0)	9.8 (49.6)	5.5 (41.9)	3.0 (37.4)	8.8 (47.8)
Record low °C (°F)	−14.8 (5.4)	−15.0 (5.0)	−8.9 (16.0)	−6.0 (21.2)	−1.3 (29.7)	3.6 (38.5)	5.3 (41.5)	5.4 (41.7)	−1.0 (30.2)	−4.2 (24.4)	−9.6 (14.7)	−12.6 (9.3)	−15.0 (5.0)
Average precipitation mm (inches)	101.8 (4.01)	82.8 (3.26)	85.7 (3.37)	106.4 (4.19)	104.2 (4.10)	85.7 (3.37)	64.1 (2.52)	64.7 (2.55)	76.8 (3.02)	91.5 (3.60)	132.0 (5.20)	98.1 (3.86)	1,093.8 (43.06)
Average precipitation days (≥ 1.0 mm)	11.8	10.4	10.5	12.7	12.2	9.8	8.5	8.0	9.0	10.6	12.1	11.1	126.8
Average relative humidity (%)	83	80	77	78	78	78	78	80	80	83	83	84	80.2
Mean monthly sunshine hours	100.6	121.6	163.7	167.0	186.4	196.2	213.2	210.9	193.0	150.3	107.4	99.4	1,909.7
Source 1: Météo France
Source 2: Infoclimat.fr (humidity, 1961–1990)

== History ==
=== Toponymy ===
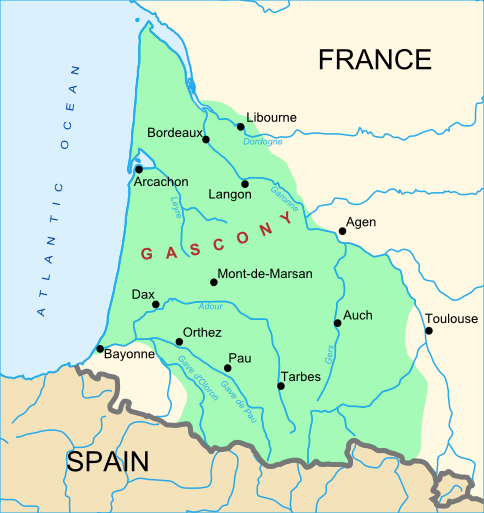
The location of Pau is shown on this map of the historical and cultural area of Gascony.

The origin of the name is uncertain. One tradition suggests it is a derivation of pal (fr. pieu), from the palisade around the original château. Another is that the name refers to a ford across the river administered by the church, the pious. According to Michel Grosclaude and other onomasticians, more recent research suggests the pre-Indo-European root for a rockface was *pal or *bal, and that the name refers to Pau's position at the foot of the mountains. The palisade or pal, from the Latin palum, also has the same ancient basis but it is not under this meaning that formed the name of Pau, this can be compared to the Col de Pau in the Aspe Valley (1,942 metres (6,371 ft), Lescun) which has nothing to do with the city. Its name in the Béarnese dialect is Pau.

The name of the town was recorded in the 12th century. The inhabitants of the city are known as paulins in Occitan, and palois in French. Their motto is Urbis palladium et gentis.

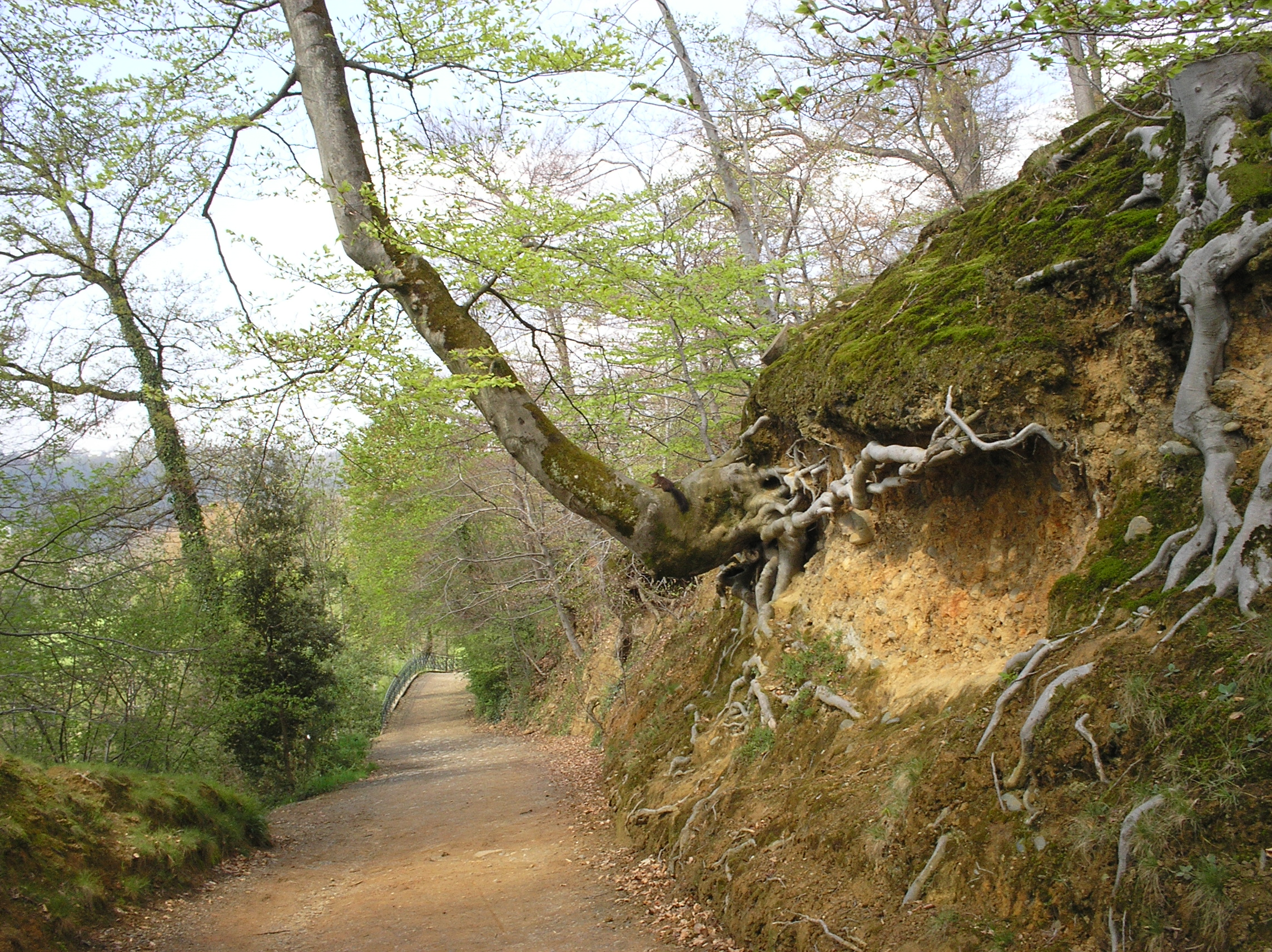
The footpath west from the Château

=== Origins ===
Before the 10th century, there are no traces to date of occupation of the site on which the city is now built. The city was built on a site with very special qualities. The Gave de Pau, which descends from the Pyrenees, was a river which was fairly difficult to cross, and for a distance of approximately 50 kilometres (31 mi), only three fords existed: from Nay to the east, from Orthez to the west and that of Pau, strategically located between the two. The northern extremity of a plateau, formed to a point, overlooks this ford of almost 80 metres (260 ft). In summary, it is an ideal natural location to control the passage and the arrivals from the Pyrenees, and a small monitoring station was built around the year 1000, a fort surrounded by a simple palisade.

The site was fortified in the 11th century to control the ford across the Gave de Pau. It was built on the north bank, equidistant from Lescar, seat of the bishops, and from Morlaàs.

Until the 12th century, this fort was consolidated and some houses were combined there, together, in a small hamlet. The lords of Béarn then granted the status of viguerie (a small administrative district in the Middle Ages) to this new village which continued to expand gently. In Bearnese, the palisade was called Paü. Historians agree to this being the origin of the name of the city.

In the 13th century, new recognition of the importance and the expansion of Pau, which had become the town of Castelnau, with a bailli appointed by the viscounts of Béarn.

Gaston Fébus (descendant of the counts of Foix and one of the first iconic figures of Béarn), who was very attached to the independence of his small country. He began his major work to reinforce the strongholds of Béarn, including the Château of Pau where he finally settled.

Pau was made the capital of Béarn in 1464, instead of Orthez. During the early 16th century, the Château de Pau became the residence of the Kings of Navarre, who were also viscounts of Béarn.

Pau is the only city in Europe in which two founders of royal dynasties were born: Henry IV of France of the House of Bourbon, born in 1553, and Charles XIV John of the Swedish House of Bernadotte, born in 1763.

=== History ===
==== Middle Ages ====
Pau was a castelnau founded at an unknown date, in the second half of the 11th or the very beginning of the 12th century, to control a fording of the Gave de Pau which was used for the passage of the shepherds in transhumance between the mountains of Ossau and pasture of the plain of the Pont-Long. A castle was built, overlooking the north bank, at equal distance from Lescar, seat of the bishops, and from Morlaàs, capital of the Viscounts of Béarn.

In 1188, Gaston VI assembled his cour majour there, predecessor of the conseil souverain and roughly equivalent to the House of Lords. Gaston VII added a third tower in the 13th century. Gaston Fébus (Gaston III of Foix and Gaston X of Béarn) added a brick donjon (keep), known as la tour Billère [the Tower of Billère].

==== 16th–18th century ====
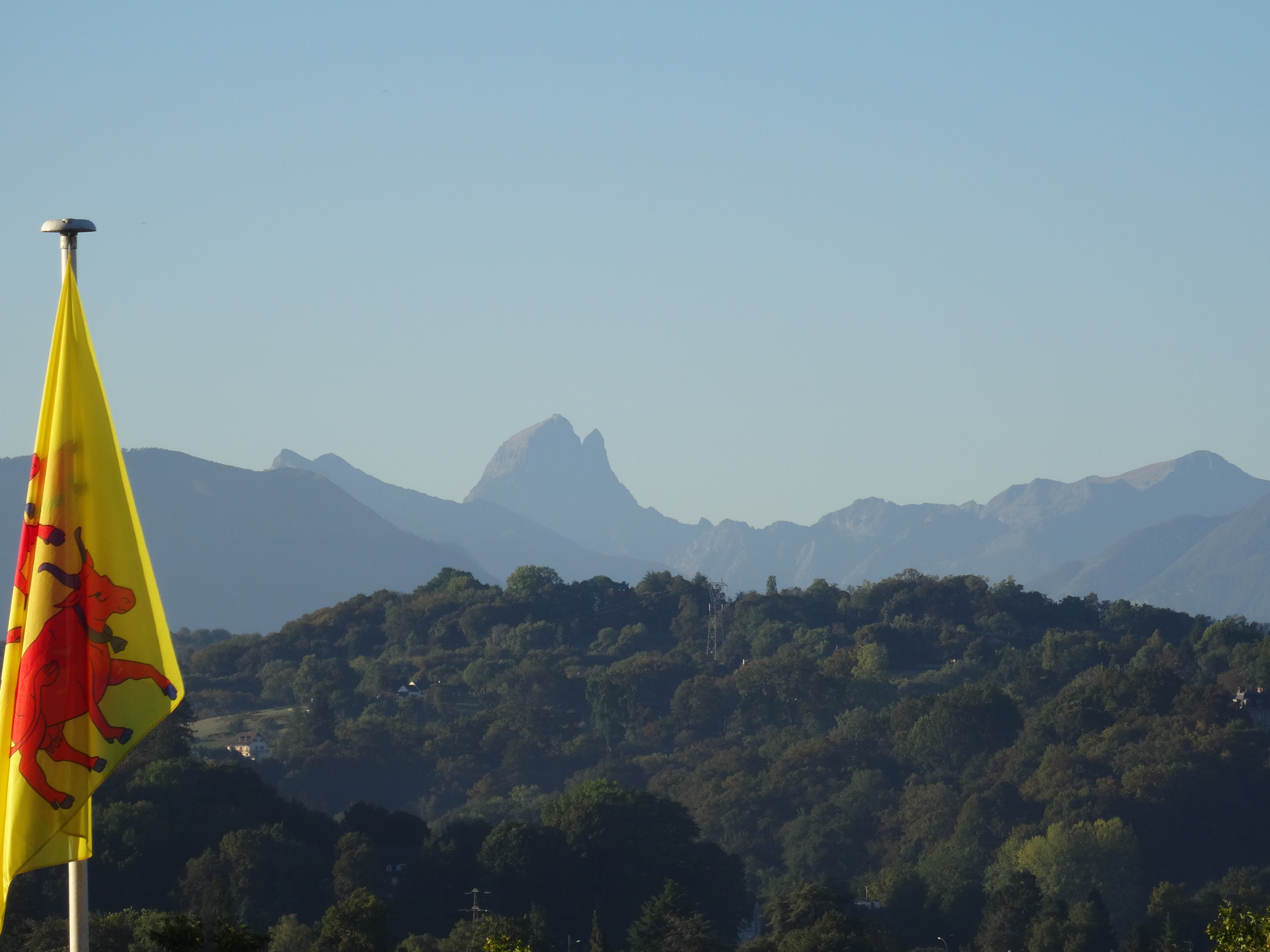
The Béarnese flag, floating in the Pyrénées

In 1464, Gaston IV of Foix-Béarn, after he married the Infanta Eleanor of Aragon, transferred his Court of Orthez to Pau. Pau thus became the fourth historic capital of Béarn, after Lescar, Morlaàs and Orthez. The city had a municipal charter; fairs took place, like the Béarn states. He transformed the curtain walls of his castle home.

In 1512, it became the capital of the Kings of Navarre, who were refugees north of the Pyrenees, after the capture of Pamplona by the Spaniards. In 1520, it had a sovereign council and a chamber of accounts.

In 1527, Henri d'Albret, King of Navarre and sovereign viscountcy of Béarn, married Marguerite of Angoulême, sister of Francis I of France: She transformed the château in the Renaissance style and created its gardens.

In 1553, his daughter, Jeanne d'Albret, gave birth to Henry III of Navarre by singing a song of Béarn to the Virgin Mary, so that the future Henry IV was "neither fearful nor balked." She had crossed into France to ensure her son would be born there. The baby's lips were moistened with the local Jurançon wine and rubbed with garlic shortly after birth. When Henry IV left Pau to become King of France, he remarked to local notables that he was not giving Béarn to France, but giving France to Béarn.

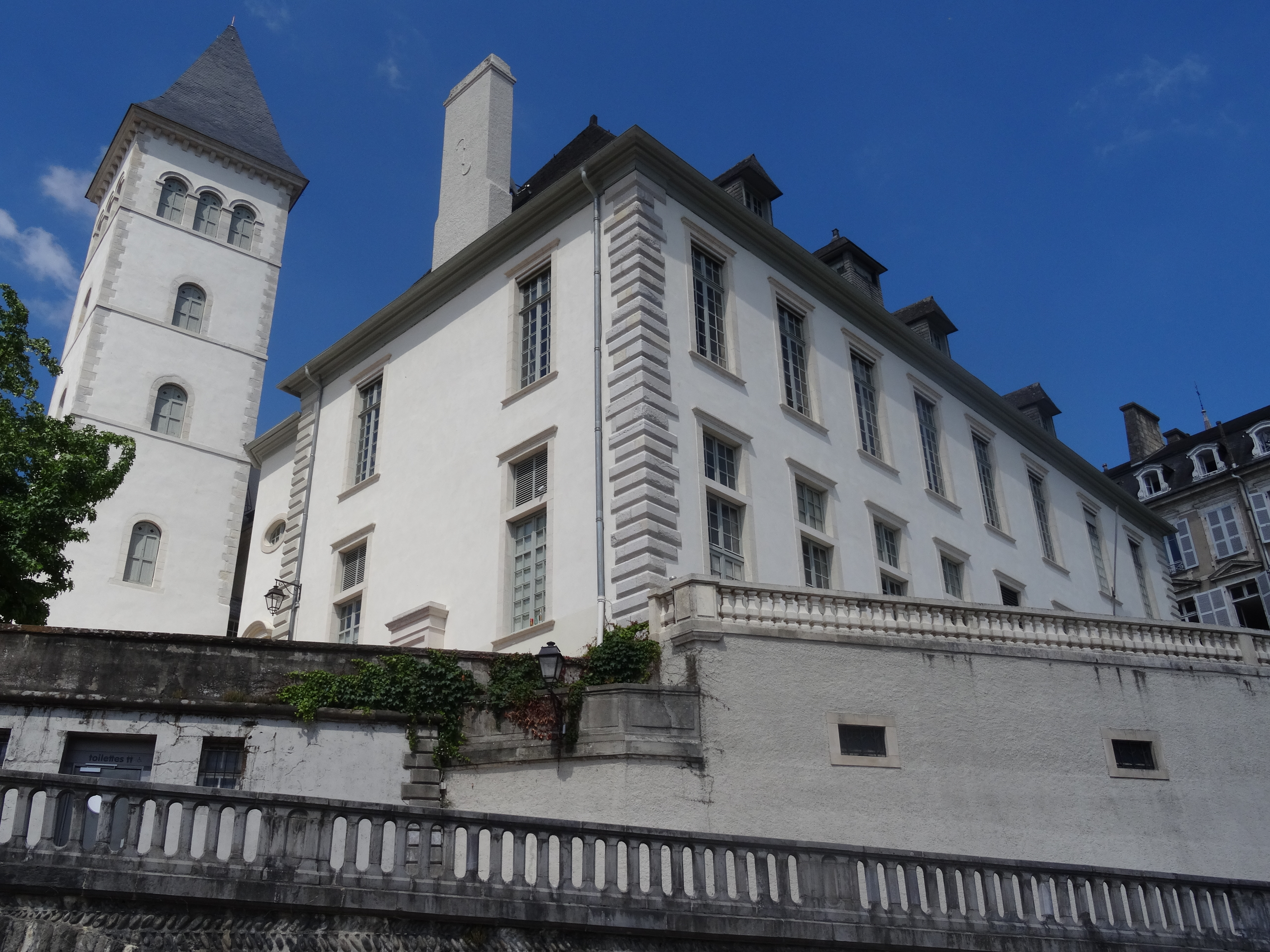
Parlement de Navarre

The troops of Charles IX took the city, but d'Albret took over in 1569. Catherine of Bourbon, sister of Henri IV, governed Béarn in his place.

In 1619, Pau revolted. Louis XIII occupied it and, after receiving the submission of the fortified town of Navarrenx, pronounced the attachment of Béarn and Navarre to France by the edict of 20 October 1620. It thus transformed the sovereign Council of Béarn in the Parliament of Navarre, joining the future courses of Pau and Saint-Palais.

Pau had a new enclosure in 1649, and then a university in 1722.

King Charles XIV of Sweden, the first royal Bernadotte, was born in Pau in the 18th century.

On 14 October 1790, it was declared, after Navarrenx, the new capital of the Department of Basses-Pyrénées. This status was removed on 11 October 1795 in favor of Oloron, then made permanent on 5 March 1796.

==== 19th century ====
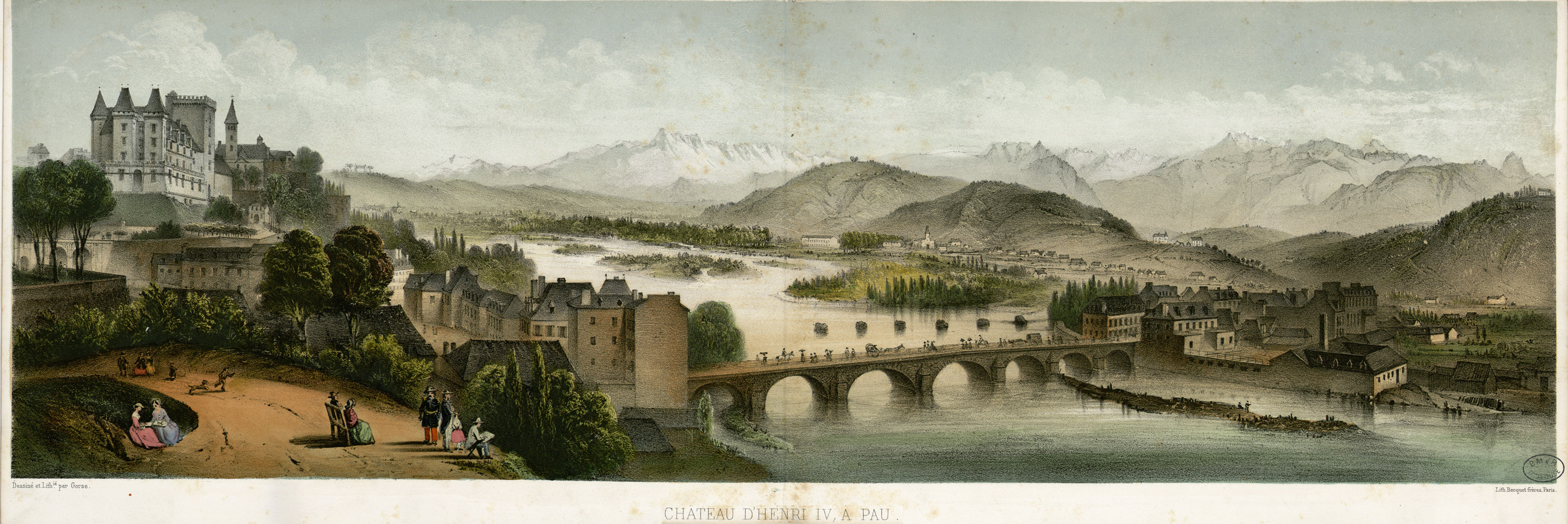
A panorama of the château and the Gave de Pau, around 1870

Napoleon expressed his interest and helped to save the château, which became a prison for a time. In 1838, Louis-Philippe did boldly restore it, to highlight the medieval and Renaissance character. Napoleon III added a double tower framing a false entry, to the West. He also added streets of Belle Époque architecture, before the fashion transferred to Biarritz.

After the July Monarchy, Pau became, between 1830 and 1914, had the most famous climate and sports resort in Western Europe. In 1842, the Scottish physician Alexander Taylor (1802–1879) advocated Pau for a winter cure. The success of his work was important and Pau became a holiday resort for the British. In 1876, there were 28,908 inhabitants of Pau. The English settled there and took advantage of the first golf on the continent, of fox hunting (Pau fox hunt), and held races at the Pont-Long Racecourse. From the 1870s the Boulevard du Midi was gradually extended to the east and west to form the current Boulevard des Pyrénées, the lavish Winter Palace – with a palmarium; and internationally renowned hotels, the Gassion and the France, which offered a majestic and luxurious setting for concerts and receptions to take place.

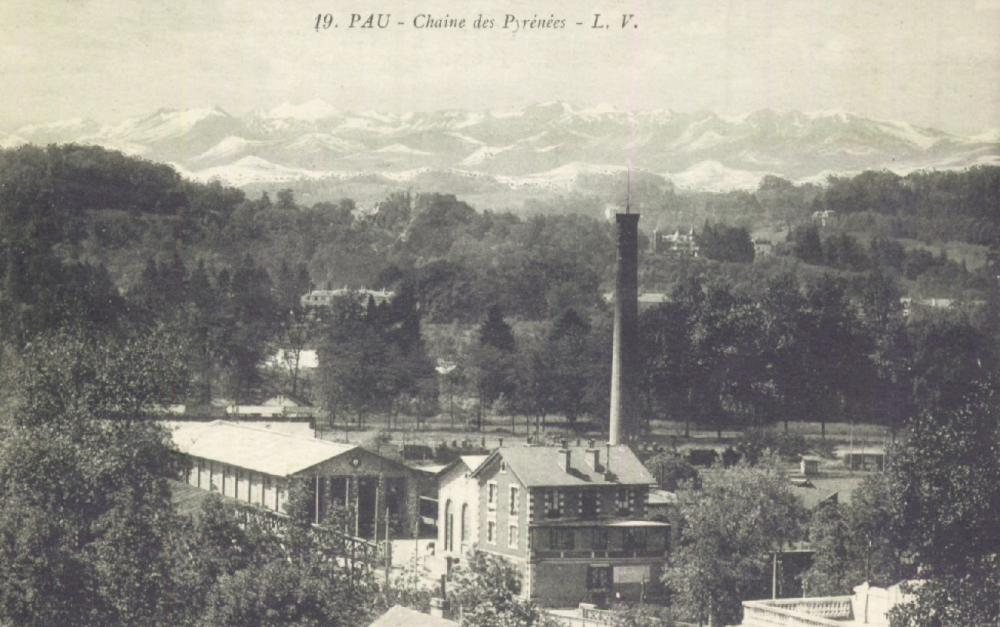
The tram factory at the start of the 20th century

From 1894, Pau was served by a network of horse tramways. A few years later, electric traction was commissioned by the Béarnaise Society of Urban Streetcars. The network consisted of three lines, with a length of 7 kilometres (4.3 mi). It disappeared in 1931. The town of Pau was also served by the Pau-Oloron-Mauléon railway (POM), whose main station was found at the Place de la République. Three lines served Monein, Pontacq and Lembeye. Steam traction was used on the network, which disappeared in December 1931.

While the upper town thrived because of the coming of the rich European tourists, the lower city specialised in industry. Many small structures gradually developed at the foot of the château, the production focused on textiles and the food industry. Many of them marked this industrial fabric, such as Courriades dyes, the Heïd flour mill and the tram factory.

Mary Todd Lincoln, the widow of the American president, also lived in Pau for several years in the late 1870s.

==== 20th century ====
At the beginning of the 20th century, Pau was still a resort town where European nobility spent the winter. Good English, American, Russian, Spanish or Prussian society met in the Béarnaise city. Many public amenities were from this period, including the Pau Funicular to connect the station to the upper town. Next to these public amenities, wealthy foreign visitors were building villas to improve the conditions of their stay. First built in the centre of town, these residences spread out more and more to enjoy the great outdoors and views of the Pyrenees. Between 1850 and 1910, many residences were thus built and still evoke the splendour of this period, today. This golden period of climate tourism in Pau stopped abruptly at the outbreak of World War I.

Pau in the early 20th century

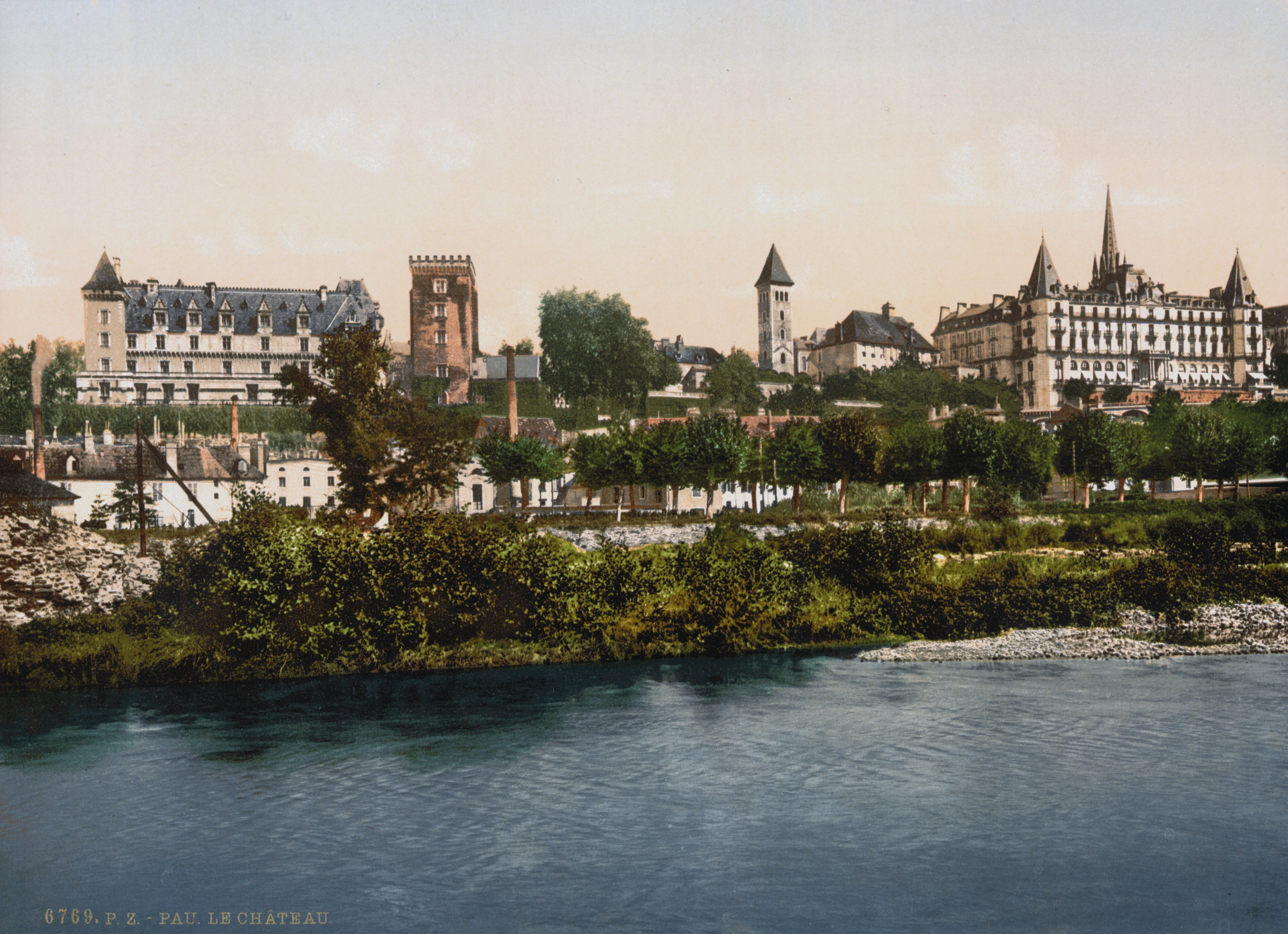
Pau at the dawn of 20th century

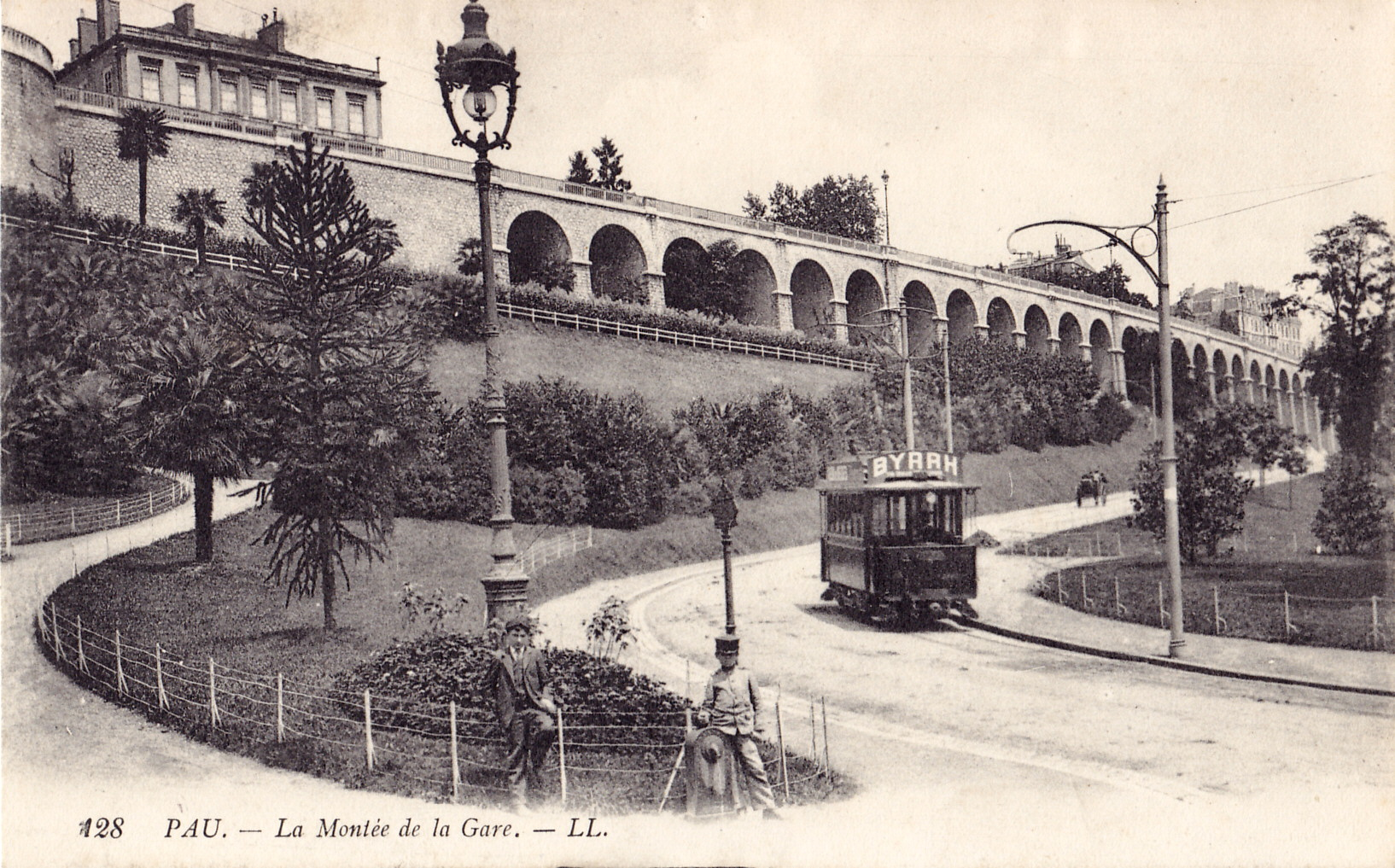
A tramcar of the Tramway de Pau on the Montée de la Gare, at the start of the 20th century

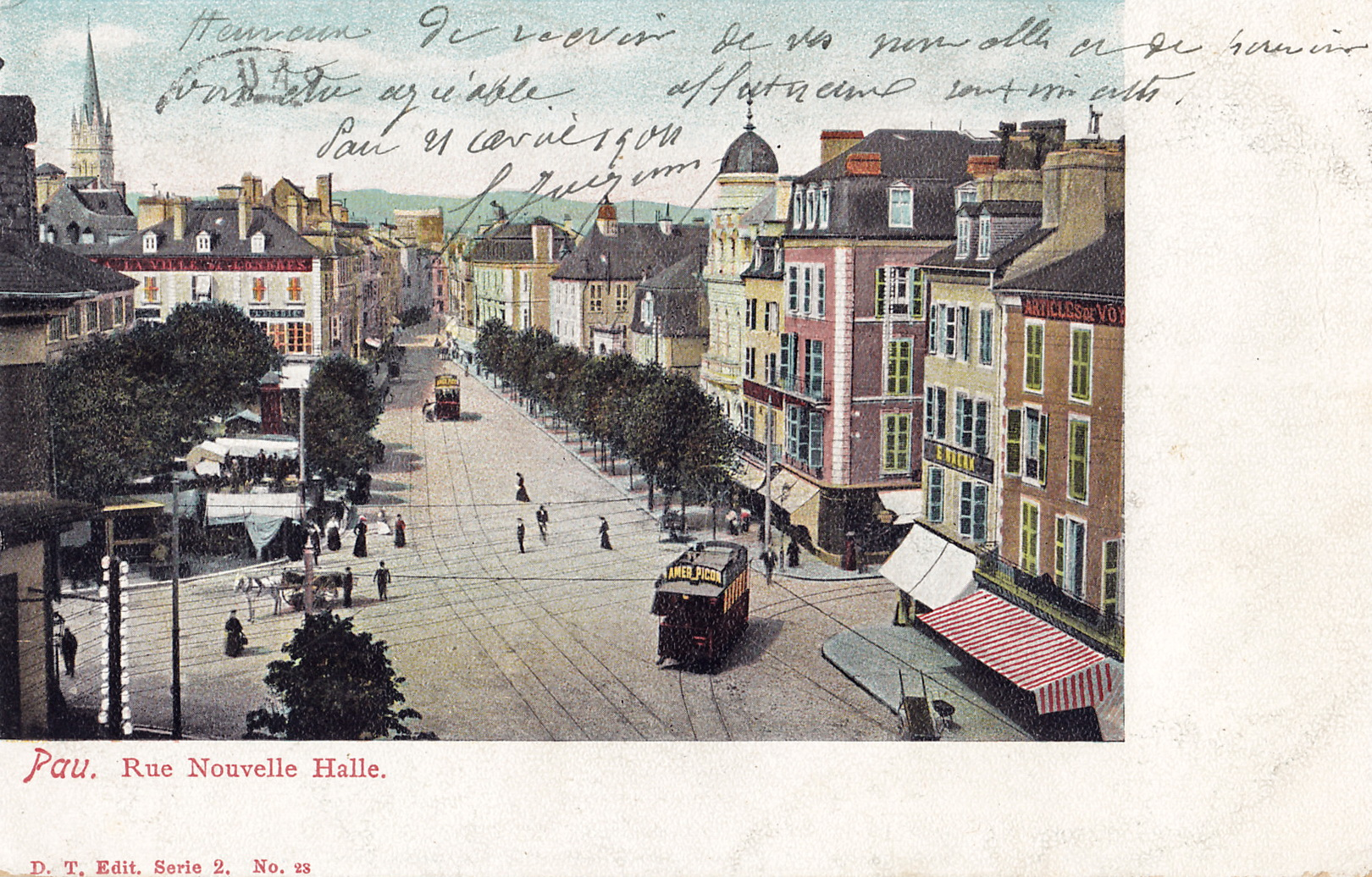
Rue de la Halle-Neuve, in 1904

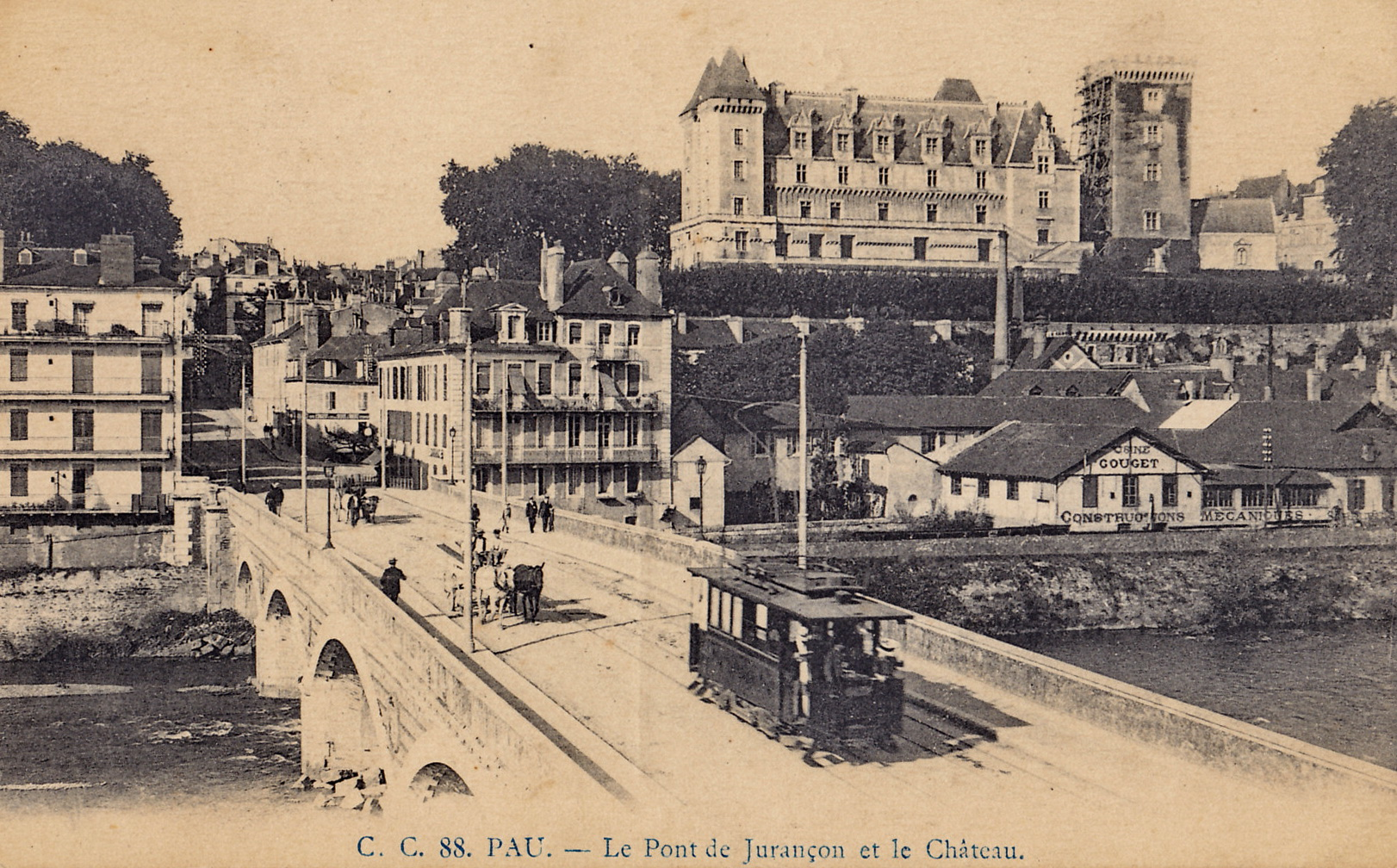
A general view, around 1910

The first balloon flights took place in Pau in 1844 and the first flights by plane, from 1909, the year in which the Wright brothers transferred to Pau (on the moor of Pont-Long, in commune of Lescar). They had originally initiated a first aviation school at Le Mans (Sarthe Department), formed of three student pilots, who they were committed to train in France. Pau alone hosted seven global aircraft manufacturers until 1914 and became the world capital of aviation. The military aviation school, which trained the flying aces of World War I, then the fighter school of France, settled there. French aviators Thénault, Simon, Paul Codos, Georges Bellenger Bellenger, Garros, Nungesser, Guynemer, and the Béarnais aviators Artigau and Mace, among many others, and finally the American aviators Lufbery, Thaw, Chapman, Prince and the McConnell brothers, were among those who flew there.

Pau hosted the 18th régiment d'infanterie, 1st and 18th Parachute Chasseur Regiment (parachute regiment) who were stationed in the town. All participated in the various conflicts of the 20th century. The 18th RCP was dissolved in 1961, due to having contributed to the putsch of the generals of Algiers. It had previously participated in the May 1958 crisis which had ended the Fourth Republic. The 1st RCP remained in barracks in 1983 in Idron camp when one of its elements was struck in Beirut by the attack of the Drakkar building, which had 58 victims among its troops.

During World War II, the Continental Hotel collected many refugees, including Jews hounded by Vichy and the Nazis, even when the soldiers of the Wehrmacht requisitioned two floors of the hotel.

From 1947, during the four mandates of Mayor Louis Sallenave, the town of Pau experienced strong growth. In 1957, exploitation of the Lacq gas field, discovered in 1951, gave new momentum to the region with the industrial development of Béarn and the Lacq area (SNPA, EDF, Pechiney and Rhône-Poulenc being the most important employers), the population of the town doubled in 20 years. Major infrastructure projects were carried out, such as the construction of several schools representing more than 100 classes, creation of the Pau-Uzein airport in 1955 (now the Pau Pyrénées Airport) to modernise the old Pau-Pont-Long airfield (in the commune of Lescar), creation of social housing (all of the Ousse des Bois in 1961, and Dufau Terrace from 1962), creation of the exhibition centre, the University of Pau and Pays de l'Adour and construction of a second bridge over the River Gave in Jurançon. A vast town planning scheme allowed the extension of the commune to the north through the coulée verte [green corridor]. The configuration of the city shortly moved from the end of the 1960s. The fame and prestige of the city increased thanks to the conference of the Indochinese States from June to November 1950, visits of Heads of State such as president Charles de Gaulle in February 1959 and the first Secretary of the Soviet Union, Nikita Khrushchev, travelling in Lacq in 1960.

André Labarrère, mayor from 1971 to 2006, worked towards a first step of the beautification of the city. Within its recent mandates, on the outskirts, the university was expanding and the Pau-Pyrénées was one of the first in France to develop a fibre-optic network, infrastructure offering a very high-speed internet access both to individuals and companies. New facilities were created, including sports, such as the Zénith de Pau}, the Palais des Sports, the Jaï Alaï, and the artificial whitewater arena. The city acquired an important centre of health. The racecourse and the airport (depending on CCI) were renovated. The centre of town also saw significant upheavals with the rehabilitation of the Palais Beaumont and the construction of a new private commercial centre named Centre Bosquet. Pau finally embarked on the pedestrianisation of its centre with the reconfiguration of its bus network, the renovation of the Place Clemenceau, the central square of Pau, and the modernisation of the Palais des Pyrénées, a shopping centre in the city centre, near to the Place Clemenceau. New underground parking compensated for the removal of 400 parking spaces on the surface; also two underground car parks gained redesigned access. Finally, a media library was created in 2012 in the Les Halles quarter.

==== 21st century ====
In 2008, at the end of a bitter political struggle, which included François Bayrou, Martine Lignières-Cassou became mayor of Pau. During this term, she included the rebuilding of the water stadium and making the Rue Joffre pedestrian. She also allowed the realisation of the City of the Pyrénées which brought different associations related to Pyreneeism into one place.

In 2014, François Bayrou became mayor, after standing against David Habib in the election. Bayrou was clearly ahead in the second round of voting.

Bayrou was named Prime Minister of France in December 2024, but vowed to stay on as mayor. He was defeated by Jérôme Marbot in the municipal elections in 2026.

=== Heraldry ===
Blason of Pau	According to Paul Raymond (archivist) in his Topographical dictionary of the Béarn-Basque country (p. 133) Pau arms are blazoned: Azure to a fence of three argent footed pales, surmounted by a peacock spreading its tail or, accompanied at point and inside two cows facing and crowned the same; the chief also or charged with a natural tortoise shell surmounted by a Royal Crown closed azure enhanced of or, accompanied by the letter capital H dexter and sinister with the Roman numeral IV also azure; Blason de Foix Béarn: Remarks; These arms are "rebus" canting arms (pau means "Palisade" in Bearnese), and of "approximation" form (the peacock said as pavon or pau [paw]).; The Viscount of Foix-Béarn on who Pau depended, his arms are inspired by the three pales of Foix and the two cows of Béarn.; In the blazon, the expression (with...) "the Roman numeral IV" is improper (IV is a number consisting of two Roman numerals) best would be: (with...) "of an IV in Roman numerals."
Blason of Pau	According to Malte-Brun in The Illustrated France from 1882, they are blazoned: Azure three pales and drawsheets of argent gathered by a fess of the same, middle pale surmounted with a peacock spreading its tail at chief, and two cows faced argent at point.; Remarks; The chief, added in 1829, is not mentioned in his Illustrated France which dates back to 1882.; Cows here are not crowned, so more resemble those of the arms of the Lords of Béarn, also not crowned.; The peacock is not of specified colour. It was probably "au naturel". Found sometimes emblazoned thus for the current coat of arms.
Former blason of Pau	According to Paul Raymond in his Topographical dictionary Béarn-Basque country (p. 133) the old arms were; Argent three pales of gules with a peacock spreading its tail the same perched on the middle.; According to Gaston of Breuille (of Pau, 1896) notes the ancient arms granted in 1482, by François-Phoebus, King of Navarre, were: Argent, three pales of gules, the peacock spreading its tail azure perched on the middle.; Remarks: These blazons are certainly incomplete or defective, because it is unclear how a peacock (or whatever it is) could be placed on a pale that by definition goes to the top of the shield. The contradiction for the peacock colour is secondary ("De gules" – "of the same" as the pales – for Raymond or "Azure" for Du Breuille); However A. Fourcade in his Picturesque and historic album of the Pyrenees (p. 9) described, in layman's terms, these arms: three pales, on one of which, namely the middle one is perched a peacock spreading its tail. granted by François-Phoebus (but in 1442 this time!); It seems that in fact it is not "pal-pièce honorable" [pale-honorable part], but a "pieux" [pious] furniture, which already foreshadows the color, the pale drawsheets formed at the foot which make up the barrier of the present coat of arms.

== Politics and administration ==
Fourth city in Nouvelle-Aquitaine (after Bordeaux, Limoges and Poitiers), Pau is the prefecture of Pyrénées-Atlantiques and the chief town of four cantons:

- Canton of Pau-1, formed from part of Pau
- Canton of Pau-2, formed from part of Pau and the commune of Idron
- Canton of Pau-3, formed from part of Pau and the communes of Bizanos and Mazères-Lezons
- Canton of Pau-4, formed from part of Pau and the commune of Gelos

=== Municipal administration ===
Below is the sharing of seats on the Pau City Council:

Group	President	Seats	Status
MoDem – UDI – UMP	François Bayrou	40	majority
PS	David Habib	9	opposition

=== Political trends and results ===
2014 municipal elections in Pyrénées-Atlantiques

=== List of mayors ===
List of mayors of Pau

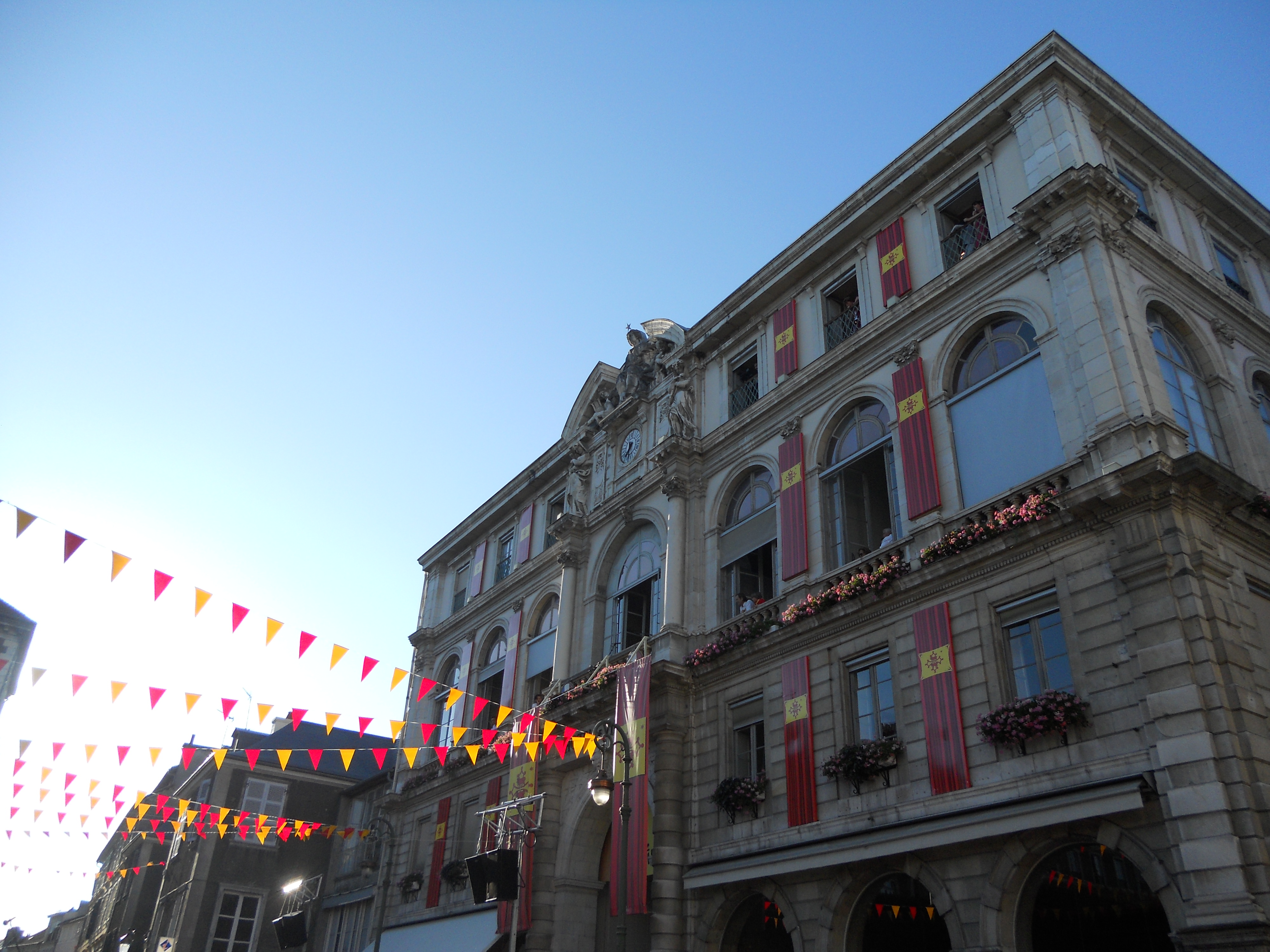
Hôtel de Ville

List of mayors of Pau
Start	End	Name	Party	Other details
1947	1971	Louis Sallenave	Centre right	No dual mandate
1971	2006	André Labarrère	PS	Deputy from 1967 to 1968, then from 1973 to 2001, Senator from 2001 to 2006, President of the Communauté d'agglomération de Pau-Pyrénées, Minister from 1981 to 1986, President of the Aquitaine Regional Council from 1979 to 1981, Vice-president of the National Assembly from 1973 to 1974, President of the Eco-Mayors Association from 1989 to 1999
2006	2008	Yves Urieta	PS	President of the Communauté d'agglomération de Pau-Pyrénées
2008	2014	Martine Lignières-Cassou	PS	Deputy of the first constituency of Pyrénées-Atlantiques; President of the Communauté d'agglomération de Pau-Pyrénées
2014	2026	François Bayrou	MoDem	Prime Minister 2024–2025; President of the Communauté d'agglomération Pau Béarn Pyrénées; Former minister of national education Former president of the General Council
2026	In progress	Jérôme Marbot	PS	President of the Communauté d'agglomération Pau Béarn Pyrénées

André Labarrère died of cancer on 16 May 2006. He was succeeded by Yves Urieta, elected by the municipal council on 30 May 2006. In the meantime, the interim was ensured by Martine Lignières-Cassou, first assistant and deputy of the First Constituency of Pyrénées-Atlantiques.

=== Intercommunality ===
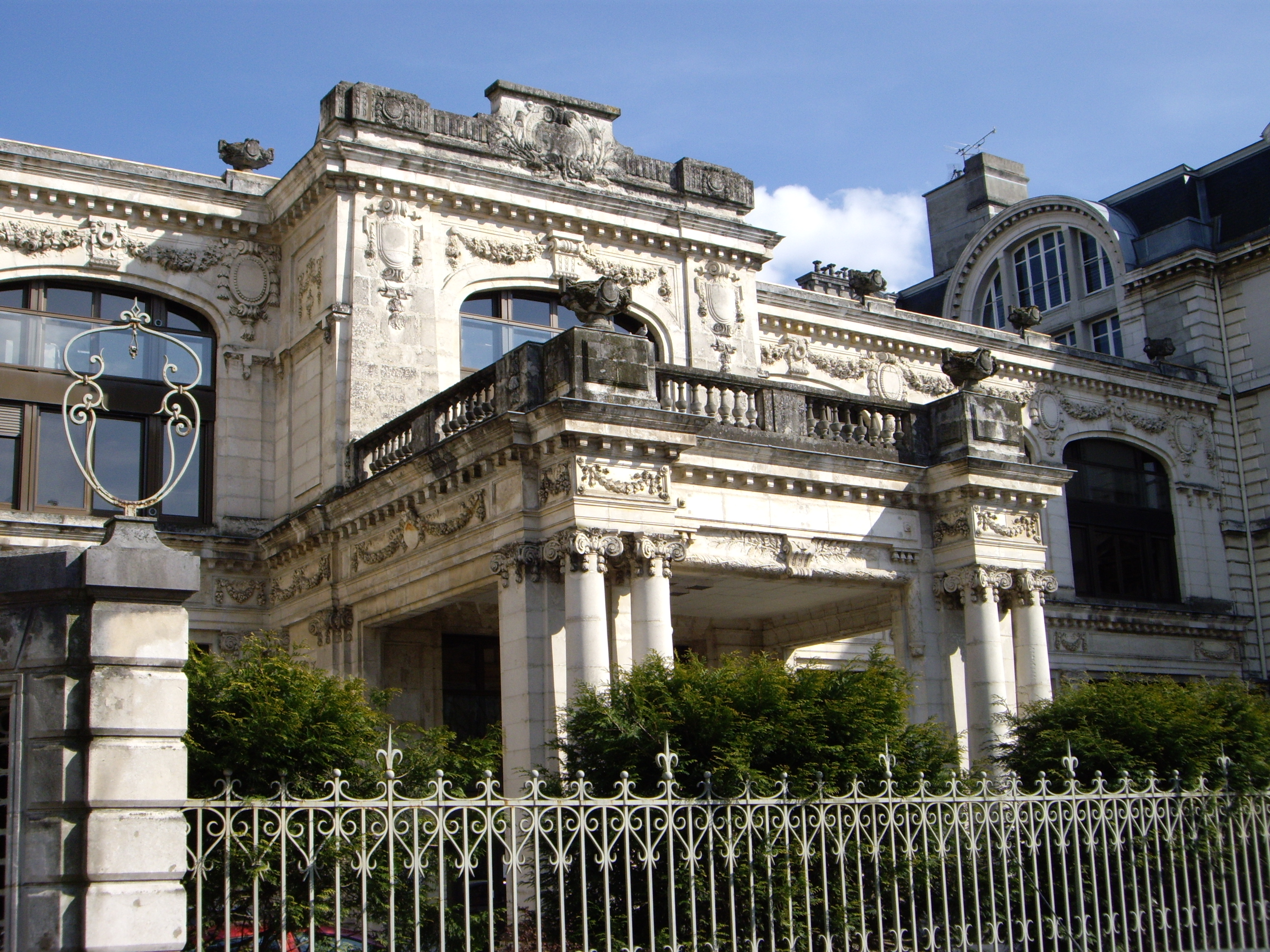
The Hotel de France, headquarters of the metropolitan area

The town of Pau is part of five intercommunal structures:

- The Communauté d'agglomération Pau Béarn Pyrénées
- The Union of the Ousse basin water development
- The Trade Union of Energy of the Pyrénées-Atlantiques
- The Intercommunal Association of the recreation centres of Narcastet
- The Intercommunal Association of Defence against flooding of the Gave de Pau

Pau hosts the headquarters of ten intercommunal groups:

- Public local management agency
- The Communauté d'agglomération Pau Béarn Pyrénées
- The Trade Union of energy of the Pyrénées-Atlantiques
- The Intercommunity Association of defence against flooding of the Gave de Pau
- The Aeropolis Joint Union
- The Joint Union of Studies of the Pau-Oloron road link
- The Joint Union of Pau Urban Transport – doors of the Pyrenees
- The Joint Union of the basin of the Gave de Pau
- The Joint Union of Greater Pau
- The Joint Union for the treatment of household and similar waste of the east basin

=== International relations ===
Pau is twinned with:

- Zaragoza, Spain, since 1970
- Mobile, United States, since 1975
- Pistoia, Italy, since 1975
- Kōfu, Japan, since 1977
- Setúbal, Portugal, since 1981
- Swansea, Wales, since 1982
- Göttingen, Germany, since 1983
- Daloa, Ivory Coast, since 1984
- Xi'an, China, since 1986

== Population and society ==
=== Demographics ===
==== Pau and the agglomeration population ====
The communal population of Pau amounts to 80,441 inhabitants, as of 2023. The Communauté d'agglomération of Pau Béarn Pyrénées has 166,794 inhabitants, and the urban unit of Pau had 206,230 inhabitants in 2022. Pau is the most populous city of the Department of Pyrénées-Atlantiques, and the fourth of the Nouvelle-Aquitaine region after Bordeaux, Limoges and Poitiers.

The towns of Billère, Lons and Lescar are the first three communes in the agglomeration after Pau (they have approximately 35,000 inhabitants combined).

==== Demographic evolution ====
Historical population

Year	Pop.	±% p.a.
1793	8,756	—
1800	8,465	−0.48%
1806	9,293	+1.57%
1821	11,444	+1.40%
1831	11,285	−0.14%
1836	12,607	+2.24%
1841	13,841	+1.89%
1846	16,170	+3.16%
1851	16,196	+0.03%
1856	18,671	+2.88%
1861	21,881	+3.22%
1866	24,563	+2.34%
1872	27,300	+1.78%

Year	Pop.	±% p.a.
1876	28,908	+1.44%
1881	29,971	+0.72%
1886	30,624	+0.43%
1891	33,111	+1.57%
1896	33,012	−0.06%
1901	34,268	+0.75%
1906	35,044	+0.45%
1911	37,149	+1.17%
1921	35,665	−0.41%
1926	37,711	+1.12%
1931	38,962	+0.65%
1936	40,451	+0.75%
1946	46,158	+1.33%

Year	Pop.	±% p.a.
1954	48,320	+0.57%
1962	59,937	+2.73%
1968	74,005	+3.58%
1975	83,498	+1.74%
1982	83,790	+0.05%
1990	82,157	−0.25%
1999	78,732	−0.47%
2007	84,978	+0.96%
2012	78,506	−1.57%
2017	77,130	−0.35%
2023	80,441	+0.70%

From 1962 to 1999: Population without double counting; for the years following: municipal population.
Source: Ldh/EHESS/Cassini until 1999 and INSEE

== Education ==
=== Kindergartens and primary schools ===
- Public school groups

- Groupe scolaire Henri IV
- Groupe scolaire Trianon
- Groupe scolaire Stanislas-Lavigne
- Groupe scolaire Nandina-Park
- Groupe scolaire Les Fleurs
- Groupe scolaire Gaston-Phœbus
- Groupe scolaire du Buisson
- Groupe scolaire Maréchal-Bosquet
- Groupe scolaire des Lilas
- Groupe scolaire de l'Hippodrome (K)
- Groupe scolaire Lapuyade
- Groupe scolaire Jean-Sarrailh
- Groupe scolaire Bouillerce
- Groupe scolaire des Quatre coins du monde
- Groupe scolaire Pierre et Marie-Curie
- Groupe scolaire Marancy
- Groupe scolaire Léon-Say
- Groupe scolaire Guillemin-Les-Lauriers
- Groupe scolaire Marca

- Private schools
- École Sainte-Ursule (K / P)
- École Joyeux Béarn (K / P)
- École Saint-Maur (K / P)
- École Saint-François d'Assise (K / P)
- École Saint-Dominique (K / P)
- École Immaculée-Conception – Beau-Frêne (K / P)
- Escòla Calandreta (K / P)
- International School of Béarn (Morlaas) (K / P)
- École Montessori de Pau, French-English bilingual school (K / P)
- Schools of "Travelling people"
- École des Voyageurs (P)

Legend: K: Kindergarten / P: Primary school

=== Secondary ===
- Public colleges
  - Collège Clermont (S)
  - Collège Jeanne d'Albret (S)
  - Collège Marguerite de Navarre (S)
  - Collège Pierre Emmanuel (S)
- Private colleges
  - Collège Immaculée Conception – Beau Frêne (S / T)
  - Collège Saint-Dominique (S / T)
  - Collègi Calandreta de Gasconha (S)
  - Collège Sainte-Ursule
  - Collège Saint-Maur

Legend: S: Secondary College / T: Technical college

- Public high schools
  - Lycée Honoré-Baradat (V)
  - Lycée Louis-Barthou (G)
  - Lycée Saint Cricq (G / V)
  - Lycée Saint-John-Perse (G)
- Private high schools
  - Lycée Immaculée Conception – Beau Frêne (G / V)
  - Lycée Saint-Dominique

Legend: G: General education high school / V: Vocational high school

=== Higher education ===
==== University ====
The city of Pau has a long academic tradition, as a university was established in Pau in 1722. Pau now has the second largest student population in Aquitaine. The city has 17,000 students and 3,900 researchers. It has a multidisciplinary university (law, economics, sciences, social sciences and humanities), an IUT, an IAE, several engineering schools, business schools and art schools.

The University of Pau and Pays de l'Adour (UPPA) had 11,200 students, in May 2012, spread across five sites: Pau, Anglet, Bayonne, Mont-de-Marsan (Landes) and Tarbes (Hautes-Pyrénées). Its location exceeds the strict framework of the Academy of Bordeaux and overlaps somewhat with that of the Academy of Toulouse. The University of Pau and Pays de l'Adour had 25 laboratories and 650 researchers in 2007.

The university group and Pyrénées Oceanes Research Campus unites the Groupe ESC Pau, five schools of engineers (ENIT Tarbes, ENSGTI, CY Tech, ESTIA Bidart-Bayonne, ISA BTP), the Institute of Business Administration (IAE) and the University of Pau and Pays de l'Adour (UPPA), with 15,000 students. The Pyrénées Oceanes Campus takes a European dimension and will soon join the University of Aragon, the University of Pamplona and several Spanish business and engineering schools. Philippe Lafontaine, Director of the ESC Pau is the University President.

==== Colleges and other institutions ====
- École nationale supérieure en génie des technologies industrielles (ENSGTI): School of Engineering University of Pau, it is located north of campus and offers training in engineering processes and in chemical engineering, research masters and doctorates.
- CY Tech, formerly EISTI : School of engineering in computer science, the CY Tech grew around the PBC (Pau Broadband Country).
- École nationale supérieure of oil and engines (ENSPM-IFP) office of Pau.
- École des mines d'Alès (EMA, laboratory).

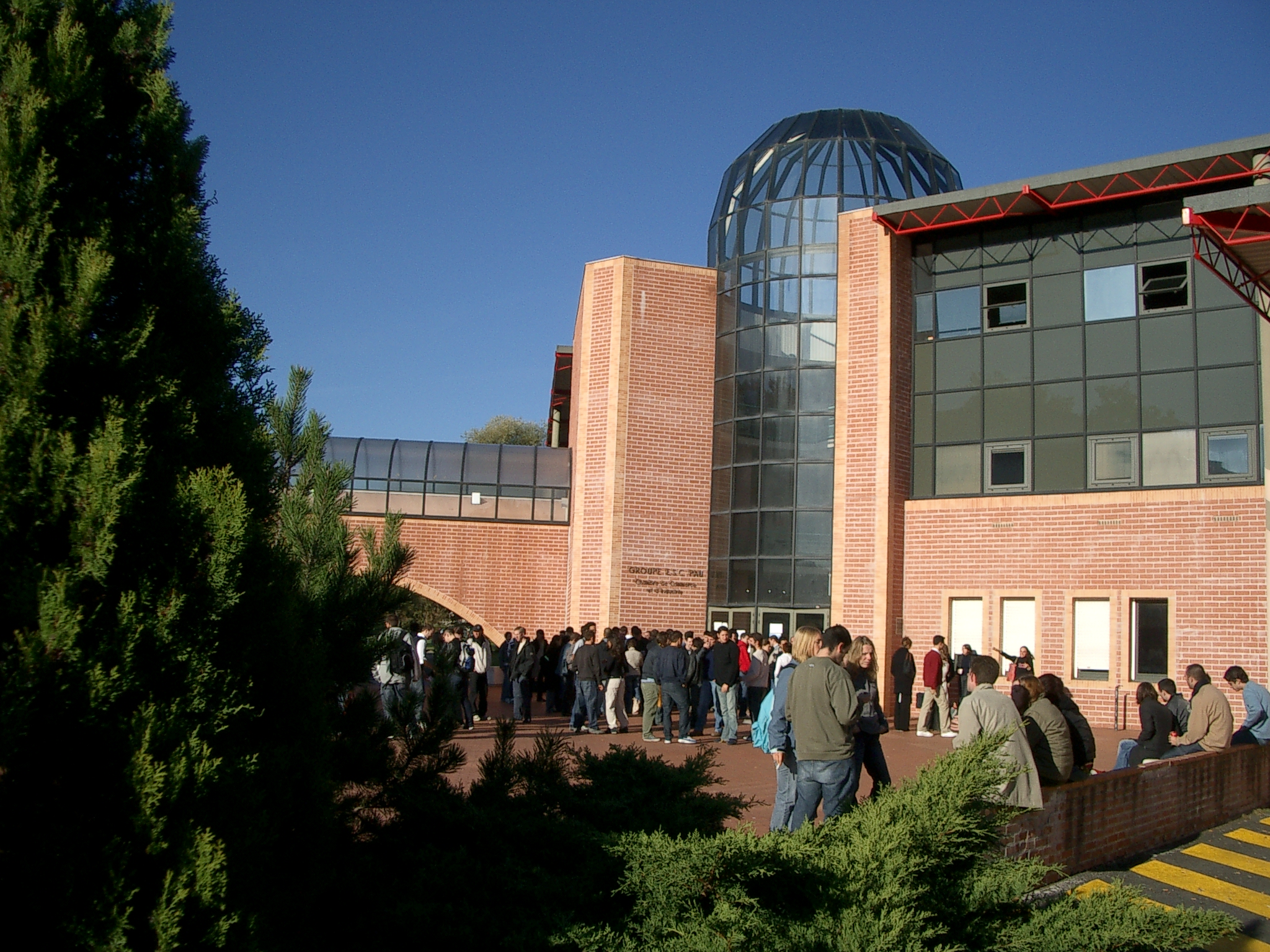
Groupe ESC Pau

- Groupe ESC Pau: School of Management created in 1962, the Groupe ESC Pau has 1,400 students and 4,700 former students. In addition to Pau, it is present in Paris, in India (Bangalore, MATS School campus) and has offices in Brazil (Recife), and in the United States in Washington. Group ESC Pau is part of the Conférence des Grandes écoles and shapes future executives and business leaders. The diploma of the ESC Pau is of master grade (BAC+5) and recognized by the Ministry of Higher Education and Research. Group ESC Pau is AFAQ ISO 9001 certified and accredited EPAS (international accreditation of the EFMD) since 2006.
- École supérieure d'art des Pyrénées (ESA of the Pyrénées): School of art and graphic design, the ESA of the Pyrénées is located at 25 Rue René Cassin.
- National School of music and dance (DMNT): DMNT de Pau is located in the former convent of the Servicers and has (1,200 students.
- School of Airborne Troops (ETAP): reference school of the Army, it trains all French paratroopers.
- Centre national professionnel des commerces de sport (NCPC): A training centre specialising in sport trade occupations. The centre depends on the ICC Pau Béarn.
- Institut d'administration des entreprises des Pays de l'Adour (IAE): Member of the network of the IAEs, the IAE de Pau offers professional and research masters and doctorates.
- Institut de formation supérieure à l'action commerciale (IFSAC). Institute of higher education in the commercial action.
- Institut de promotion commerciale (IPC). Institute of sales promotion.
- Conservatoire national des arts et métiers (CNAM).
- School of engineering of CFAI Adour (centre of training for apprentices of industry in Adour)
- Centre for training and development for extended communications.
- École supérieure d'informatique (EXIA).
- Centre for industrial studies (CESI).
- Institute of nursing training (IFSI).
- Pierre Bourdieu Institute of social work Pau – Pyrénées (ITS): ITS de Pau was renamed in 2006 as ITS Pierre Bourdieu, in homage to the Pau sociologist and offers training in medical fields.
- School of teaching and education of Aquitaine (attached to the University Bordeaux IV).
- Institut National Formation Recherche Éducation Permanente (INFREP).
- Various economic, literary and scientific preparatory classes for Louis Barthou and Saint-Cricq high schools.
- Institut universitaire de technologie des Pays de l'Adour: departments GTE and STID.

==== Research centres ====
The university has 34 teams of research including 11 teams associated with the CNRS and INRA team. Some groups of public or private research teams:

- The Institute for Research on Companies and Development (IRSAM)
- The IRMAPE, the Centre for Research in Management and on the organisation of the Groupe ESC Pau
- The Institute of Environmental Biology Aquitaine South (IBEAS)
- Psychosensory Properties of Materials (2psm) founded by the École des mines of Alès and the University of Pau.
- The Environment and Materials Multidisciplinary Research Institute (IPREM), comprising four teams of CNRS. The new building was inaugurated in 2006 on the Heliparc technopole.
- The Ecole des Mines de Paris, which has a drilling test centre within the Helioparc technopole (heir to the drilling bench designed by the NFSS then ELF Aquitaine teams in 1970–1997), for the design and optimization of cutting tools
- The Multidisciplinary Institute for Applied Research in the field of petroleum engineering (IPRA)
- The French Petroleum Institute (IFP) office of partnership with PME-PMI
- The Jean-Feger Scientific and Technical Centre, centre for research and development of TotalEnergies (formerly ELF Aquitaine (exploration and production sector), main place of oil research in Europe, bringing together more than 2,000 people including 800 researchers.)
- Centre of Research and Legal Analysis (C.R.A.J. – EA 1929), federative structure which is made up of most of the faculty members of private law of the UPPA around several research units: Jurisprudence Observatory (O.D.J.), the Centre of Comparative Law on Family and People (O.F.A.P), Research Unit in Obligational Law and Affairs (Brussels) and the Research Unit of Criminal Law and Criminal Sciences (Jean Pinatel Criminal Sciences Unit / U.J.P.).

The centre is the home of master students of private law, and doctoral students in private law in partnership with the graduate school SSH 481.

- Training Institute in Music Pedagogy: IFPM Robert Kaddouch
- Centre for Research in Pedagogy. Training of music teachers and teaching of the Kaddouch pedagogy applied to all matters. The Kaddouch pedagogy is in collaboration with the Sorbonne, Paris 5, research unit of the GINDEV headed by Professor Olivier Houdé.

== Health ==
=== Hospitals ===
- The Centre Hospitalier de Pau is composed of three home centres arranged as follows:
  - The François Mitterrand Hospital
  - The Hauterive Centre, including the functional rehabilitation service, care and medical rehabilitation unit and the nuclear medicine service, among others
  - The Jean-Vignalou Centre, intended for Gerontology
- A specialised facility, Centre Hospitalier des Pyrénées, situated on Avenue du Général-Leclerc, is a public establishment of mental health.

=== Paramedical training institutes ===
- The Institute of training of health (IFCS) provides the training of healthcare managers, nursing sector
- Training in nursing Institute (IFSI) and the Institute for training of the caregivers (IFAS)
- The centre for continuing education of health professionals (CFCPS)

=== Private clinics and centres ===
The Centre Hospitalier de Pau has contributed to the establishment of an important centre of health by enabling the consolidation of different private institutions close to the hospital area:

- The Jeunes Chênes [Young Oaks]: establishment of care and rehabilitation (access from the Boulevard de l'Europe)
- The Polyclinic of Navarre, Boulevard Hauterive
- The Princess Clinic, Boulevard Hauterive
- The Béarnais Nest, Boulevard Hauterive

It also hosts the site of the French Establishment of Blood (145, Avenue de Buros).

The Marzet Polyclinic, situated on Boulevard Alsace-Lorraine, was bought by the Polyclinic of Navarre in 2013. The new arrangement has 400 beds and employs nearly 700 people.

== Gastronomy ==
Pau, became the historic capital of Béarn in 1464, offering the gastronomic specialities of the southwest and typical Béarnese or Palois dishes:

- Garbure, a comforting soup made from cabbage, beans, confit of goose, ham or bacon
- The confit, breast and other dishes derived from duck or goose
- The ventrèche, slice of dried pork belly, eaten plain or accompanied by a fried egg
- The broye, thick and salty boiled maize flour, with added whey or goose fat, consumed as fried slices from the pan, or cubes with coffee with milk
- The trinxat, a local mountain dish consisting of mashed cabbage and potatoes mixed in smoked bacon, which is fried
- The palombe, regional name for wood pigeon, a migratory bird that crosses the southwest region, cooked in a sauce or roasted
- The poule au pot, a sort of stew in which a stuffed chicken is boiled
- Ham known as "de Bayonne" is in fact a Béarnese ham, made from the pigs of the Aspe and Ossau Valleys. This ham was historically salted at Salies-de-Béarn then exported via the Adour River from the port of Bayonne, from where the incorrect name of jambon de Bayonne [Bayonne ham] arose. Today, the bulk of Bayonne ham is made in Bearn. Pork, and in particular the black pig, was introduced in the Basque country in the 1960s to deal with a serious agricultural crisis
- The Pyrenean Cheese, the mountain sheep's milk, whom the best known is the Ossau-Iraty (AOC). This cheese can be enjoyed especially with cherry jam, which is the renowned black cherry jam from Itxassou
- The greuil(h), annealed whey from sheep, eaten cold and plain, often sweet and elongated with a bit of coffee or salted (the ricotta equivalent)
- The Coucougnettes du Vert Galant, hazelnut coated with a thin layer of chocolate all in almond paste, elected best sweet in France in 2000
- The gâteau à la broche (or Gâteau of the Pyrenees, or Rock of the Pyrenees), monumental pyramidal cake, usually cooked for weddings. It is slowly built by accumulation of layers of a dough rich in eggs, registered on a spindle turning over a fire, so that the bright yellow crust is bristling with many points or nipples
- Merveilles, crispy fritters traditionally made for Mardi Gras, from a thick paste of wheat flour, eggs, sugar and fat, stretched to a roll, cut and then fried
- Honey from the hillsides of Jurançon and Saint-Faust. Béarn is one of the premier honey regions. It is used in sauces, desserts and joined with duck produce (duck breast with honey)
- Jurançon, a dry white wine, renowned as mellow
- Madiran wine
- The Béarn wine, a light red wine whose vineyards are located to the west of Béarn
- Pacherenc wine, a sweet white wine produced high on the borders of Gers and Hautes-Pyrénées

=== Restaurants and bars ===
Pau has more than 160 restaurants, found in the historic city center (Château, Hédas), and beyond. The Béarnaise capital has several quarters which are particularly animated at night, including the quarters of the triangle, the Boulevard des Pyrénées and also Rue des Orphelines.

== Culture ==
The town of Pau is marked by a strong cultural identity, with the presence of a French-Occitan bilingual school (calandreta Paulina) (90 students) in Pau and one in the metropolitan area in Lescar (60 students), by a living practice of Béarnese and the success of the Occitan cultural groups. The city has, however, received foreign influences of major importance (English, Spanish, Russian, Brazilian) and remains very open to the outside with a large English student community, along with the presence of Dutch, Portuguese, Spaniards and Moroccans. Near Dax, Bayonne and Biarritz, the Pau people have a love of city ferias. The bandas, bodegas (drinking places with typical animation) and Béarnese singing groups are numerous including Nadau, Lo Cèu de Pau and Balaguera. Since 2005, the city hosts the festival Hestiv'oc which is the grand festival of Occitania. The University of Pau, Université de Pau et des Pays de l'Adour, also often hosts concerts and cultural events.

The Association of the Palois and Béarnese in Paris, La Garbure, was founded around 1890 by a Béarnese pharmacist who went to the capital to open a shop on Boulevard Haussmann. The history of this association, which has never had official status, is transmitted only orally. However, the original spirit remains the same. The "expatriates" meet two or three times a year in a friendly atmosphere to speak of the country around a good meal. Without issue, and without political dimension, although politicians like Louis Barthou, François Bayrou and others have never neglected this "sounding board" which also brings together celebrities from entertainment, from information and from gastronomy.

=== Language ===
The Béarnese state language, before 1789, was a Gascon dialect of Occitan. For the anecdote, there is an English-Béarnese dictionary for the use of the British who were vacationing in Pau. One theory of the origin of the word caddie was that it was formed at Pau Golf Club (Billère) from the Béarnese capdèth.

The Ostau Bearnés is a Pau organization bringing together all who practice or teach the language.

=== Centres and cultural facilities ===
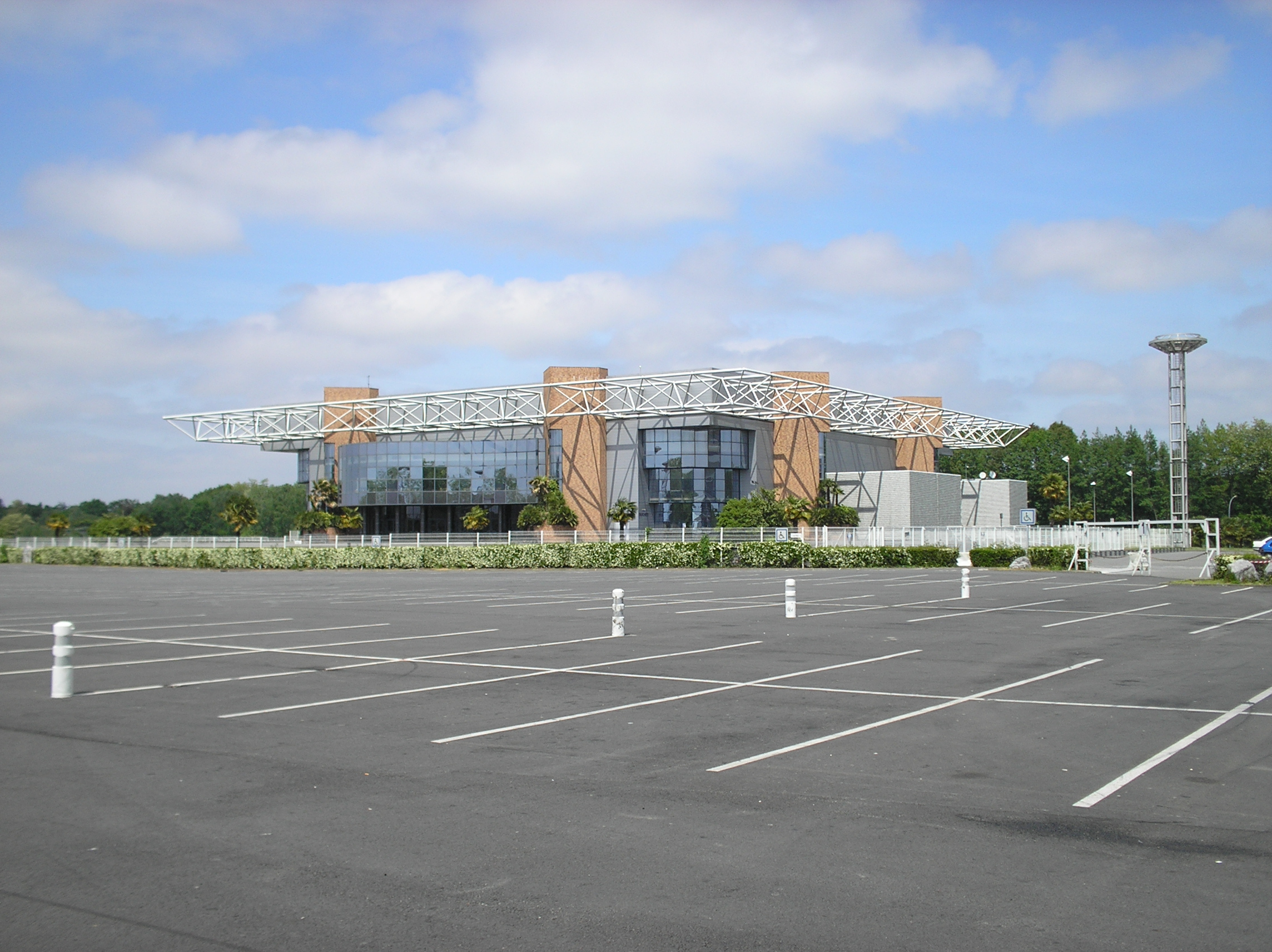
The Zénith de Pau

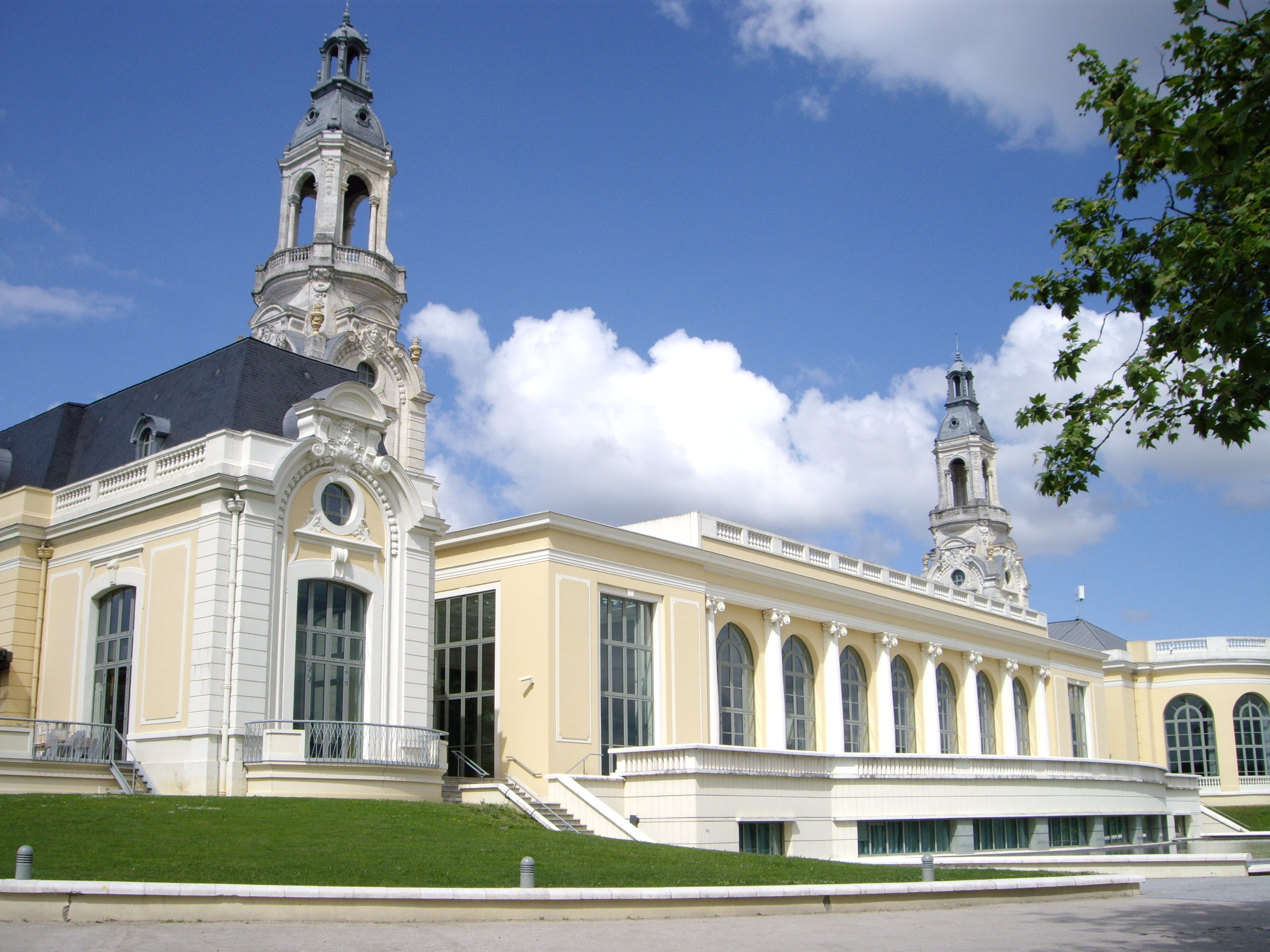
The Palais Beaumont

- The Zénith: Very modern with a capacity of 6,800 (or up to 4,500 seats), it hosts national and international artists in operas, concerts, cabarets, shows and circus on ice. It is located near the Palais des Sports, on Boulevard Cami Salié.
- The André Labarrère Intercommunal Library, on Place Marguerite Laborde, is the work of architect Daniel Rubin, and opened its doors in June 2012. It was intended as the bridgehead of a network of ten libraries in the Pau-Pyrenees agglomeration. A sober architecture, block compact glass and steel and occupying less than 2,000 square metres (22,000 sq ft), the ground space revolves around a huge interior with a 17 metres (56 ft)-high atrium serving 3 floors: 5,400 square metres (58,000 sq ft), 184,000 documents (including 14,000 CDs and 7,000 DVDs) and 400 titles of journals are thus made available to all. A 120-seat auditorium, an exhibition hall of 198 square metres (2,130 sq ft), the news space or Interlude Space has also been built within the structure. Originally laid down on a section of Beaumont Park as part of a project by architect Zaha Hadid (Priktzer 2004 Award winner), financial and technical constraints changed the views of the mayor in early 2007 and finally brought the media library to a part of the site occupied by the Henry-IV School.
- The Palais Beaumont, auditorium, home of the Symphony Orchestra of Pau-Pays de Béarn. The congress centre is part of the grouping of the HCCE (Historic Conference Centres of Europe).
- The Parc des expositions de Pau: Located to the west of the city, straddling Pau and Billère, it welcomes 450,000 visitors and 200 events per year.
- The Méga CGR Cinema located next to the university is equipped with 12 digital and 3D screens. The multiplex offers a large and public programming.
- The CGR Saint-Louis Cinema in the city centre is equipped with 7 digital rooms. Renovated in October 2012, it offers intermediate programming between arthouse and trials and commercial movies, including several movies per week operated both in VF (French version) and OVFST (original version subtitled French).
- The Le Méliès Cinema: Housed in a former church, this arthouse and trial cinema offers a rich and diverse programming with three labels; "young audiences", "research and discovery" and "heritage and directory". It has two rooms (306 and 100 seats). The cinema offers thematic evenings and events in partnership with various cultural actors (Cin'es'pace, a summer at the movies, etc.) and organises a festival every year (the International Festival of Film of Pau).
- Les Abattoirs [The Slaughterhouses]: Is an intercommunal cultural hub (PCI) at Billère: The old slaughterhouse was renovated into cultural centre of modern art, Le Bel Ordinaire, the centre houses a concert hall, l'Ampli, exhibition halls, a theatre stage and recording studios. Public cultural facilities, the PCI puts support for contemporary art and the territorial cultural cooperation at the heart of its missions. One of the specifics of the project is to enable cultural structures, associations, artists and inhabitants to join the project, so that they can be involved in its development and its implementation.
- The Centrifuge: The Centrifuge is the cultural service of the University of Pau and Pays de l'Adour but also a room for concerts, performances and an exhibition space located in the student home on the campus. Throughout the year, eclectic and quality international programming is offered.
- The La Pépinière [Nursery] Socio-cultural centre.

=== Museums ===
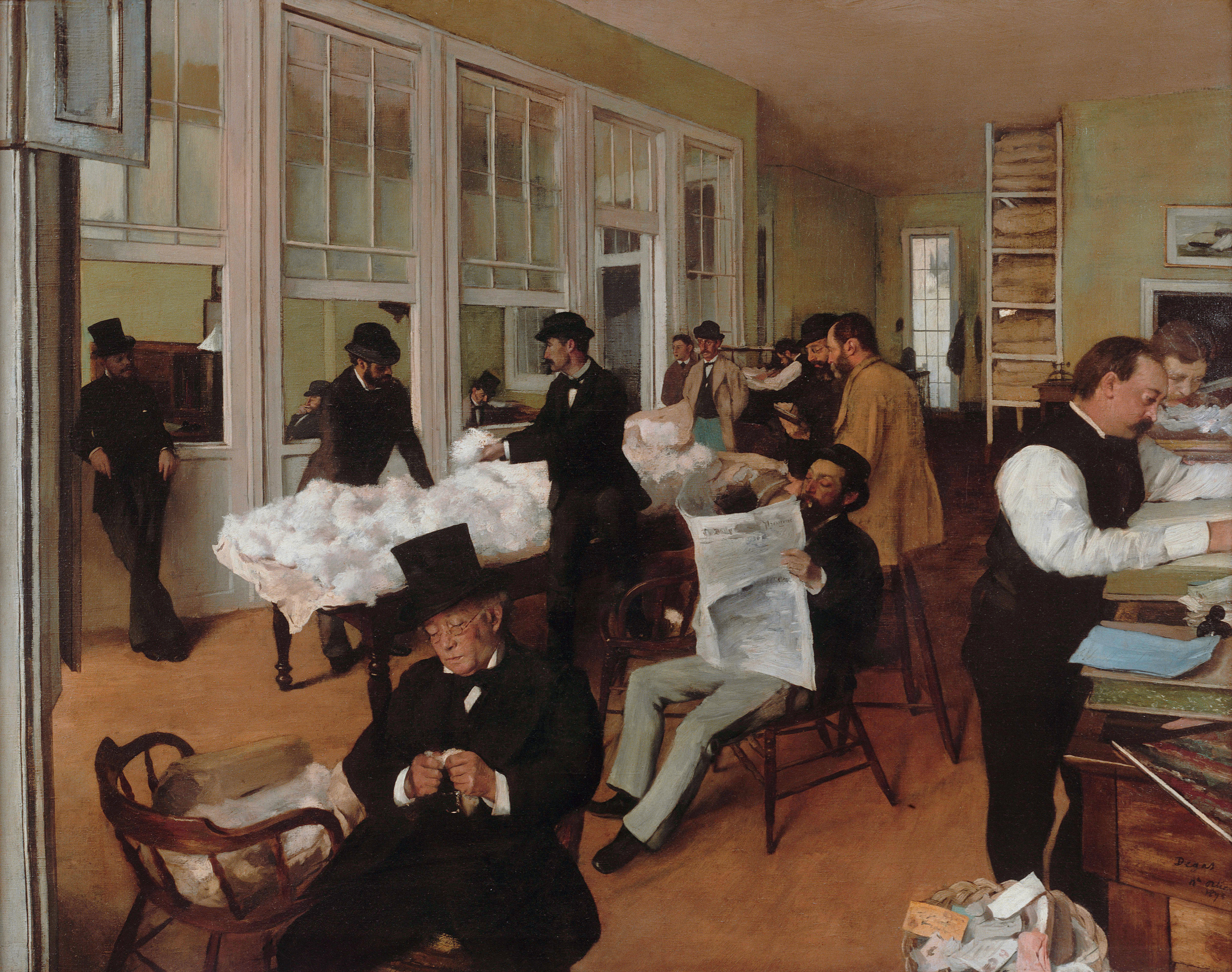
Edgar Degas, Le Bureau du coton à la Nouvelle-Orléans (The cotton office in New Orleans), 1873, at the Musée des Beaux-Arts de Pau

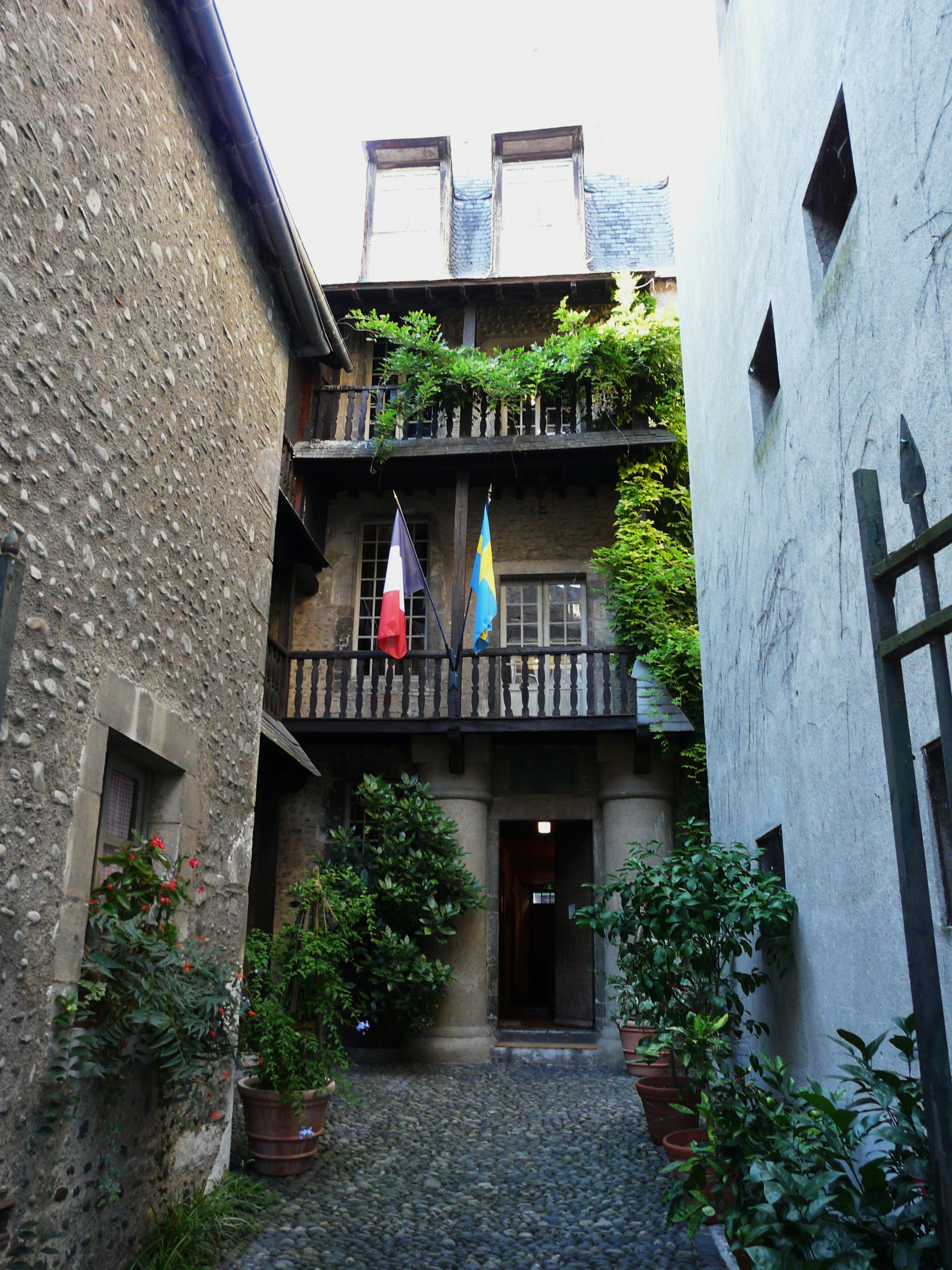
Entrance to the Musée Bernadotte, on Rue Tran

- National Museum of the Château de Pau: created in 1929 and housed in the castle in which was born the future Henry IV on 13 December 1553. Not only a genuine medieval fortress, but also a Renaissance palace and Royal residence, this museum located in the center of the city is one of the most visited national museums of France (average of 100,000 visitors per year). Successive conservators are keen to bring together paintings, art objects and documents relating to the time of Henry IV. Inside, simple and warm decor with wood-panelled walls, enhanced with threads of gold, coffered ceilings and Gobelins tapestries, houses one of the collections of France.
- Musée des beaux-arts de Pau: Inaugurated in 1864 under the initiative of Société béarnaise des amis des arts [Béarnaise society of friends of arts], this museum only housed a collection of twenty-five pieces, completed in 1872 by the donation of the Béarnais collector Louis La Caze. It was the first museum in 1878 to show a significant work by Degas, Le bureau du coton à la Nouvelle-Orléans [The cotton office in New Orleans]. It presents ancient and contemporary works from the 15th to the 20th century, with paintings of Spanish, Flemish, Dutch, English, French and Italian schools: Brueghel, Degas, El Greco, Guillaumin, Jordaens, Lhote, Morisot, Nattier, Ribera, Rubens, Van Loo, Zurbarán and regional artists Eugène Devéria (1805–1865) and Victor Galos (1828–1879). There is a large collection of sculptures of the 19th century, with works by Arp, Glioli and Lasserre. Of many fine art prints relating to the region, including the watercolour by Gustave Doré Cirque de Gavarnie, as well as contemporary works by Soto, Vasarely and the hyperrealistic Pau school artists, which complete the picture.
- Musée Bernadotte: The modest home of a cooper that saw the birth and growth of Jean-Baptiste Jules Bernadotte, who became Marshal of France and King of Sweden in 1818 and founder of the current ruling family of that country. It contains a collection of works and objects relating to the history of this Béarnese person, it also has a realisation of classical living conditions of a family of the 18th century in Pau.
- The Béarnese Museum: Its reopening to the public is not currently scheduled. There were collections of popular arts and traditional objects of Béarn: Fauna, flora, costumes, furniture and crafts (manufacture of the beret, sneakers and clogs, weaving, quarry).
- Museum of paratroopers
- Museum of the resistance and the deportation, located since 2007 in the Villa Lawrance (Germanic-style villa created in 1857 and which is also the current headquarters of the English Circle which perpetuates the British tradition)
- Pau, land of aviation, at the Palais Beaumont, a permanent exhibition that traces the history of aviation in Pau.

=== Exhibition spaces ===
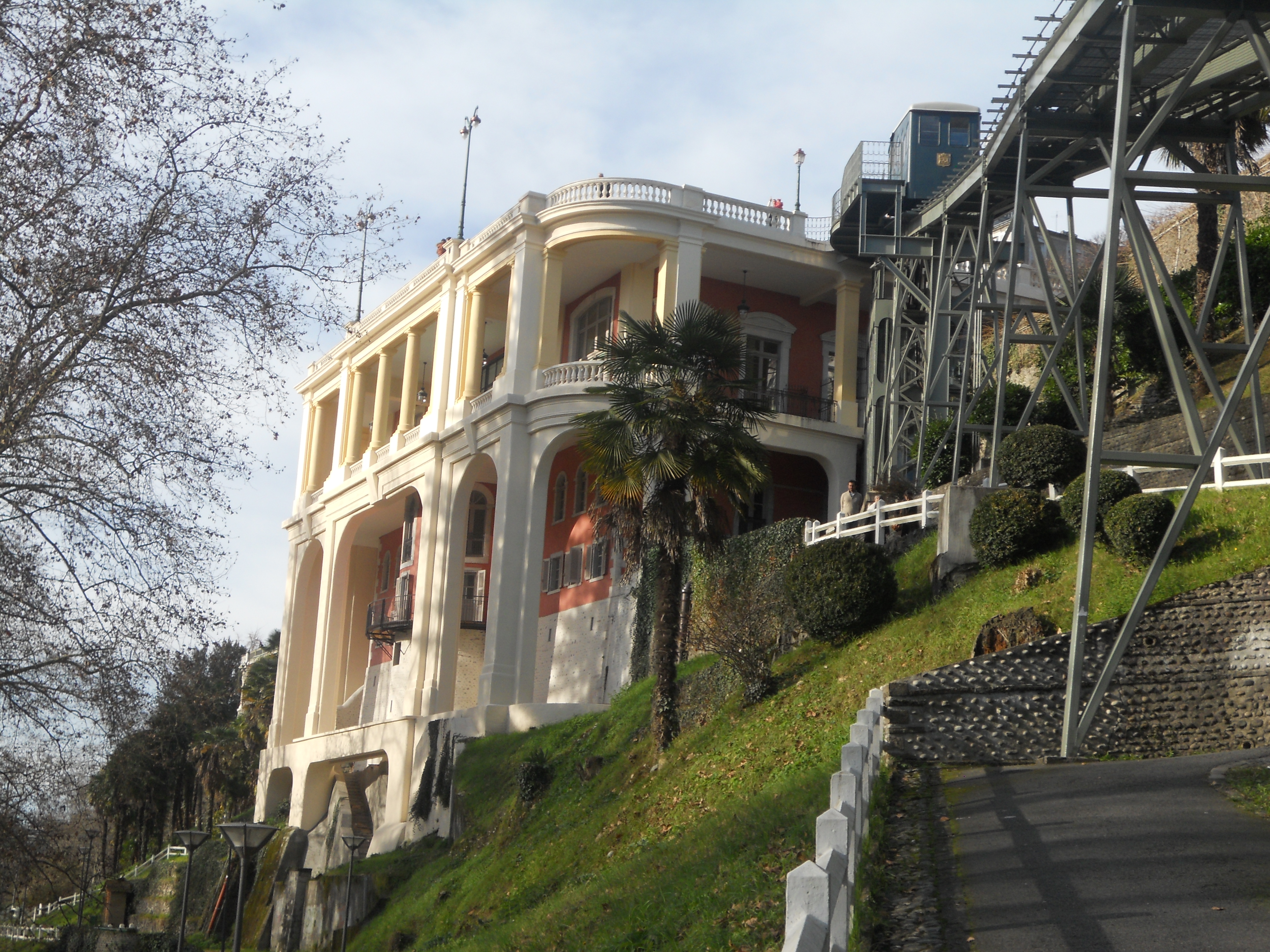
The Pavillon des Arts

- The Palais Beaumont
- The Pavillon des Arts
- The peristyle of the Hôtel de Ville
- The André-Labarrère media library
- The Nouste-Henric Hall
- The Chapel of the Perseverance
- The Cité des Pyrénées
- The department hall

=== Theatres and orchestral formations ===
- The Orchestra of Pau Pays de Béarn (OPPB), was conducted from 2002 by Fayçal Karoui. This symphonic orchestra sits in the Alfred de Vigny Auditorium of the Palais Beaumont, but also in France and abroad (Zaragoza, Nantes for La Folle Journée, Festival de La Roque-d'Anthéron, Ravenna, Venice, Paris for the Festival Présences). In 2012 the orchestra moved to Nantes, Bilbao, and Tokyo for "Les Folles Journées" of these three cities.
- Two amateur orchestras: The Ossau and the EOP (Orchestral Ensemble of Pau)
- The Théâtre Saint-Louis, historic theatre of Pau near the Place Royale and the city hall
- The Saragosse Theatre, a subsidised dance-theatre Pau/Béarn with plural spaces in the Saragosse Quarter
- The Tam-Tam Theatre
- The Artscène Theatre
- The Théâtre du Monte-Charge
- The Bourbaki Theatre (it closed its doors in 2014)

The Comédie des Mutins in Lescar, in the Pau agglomeration, can be added to this list.

=== Festivals ===
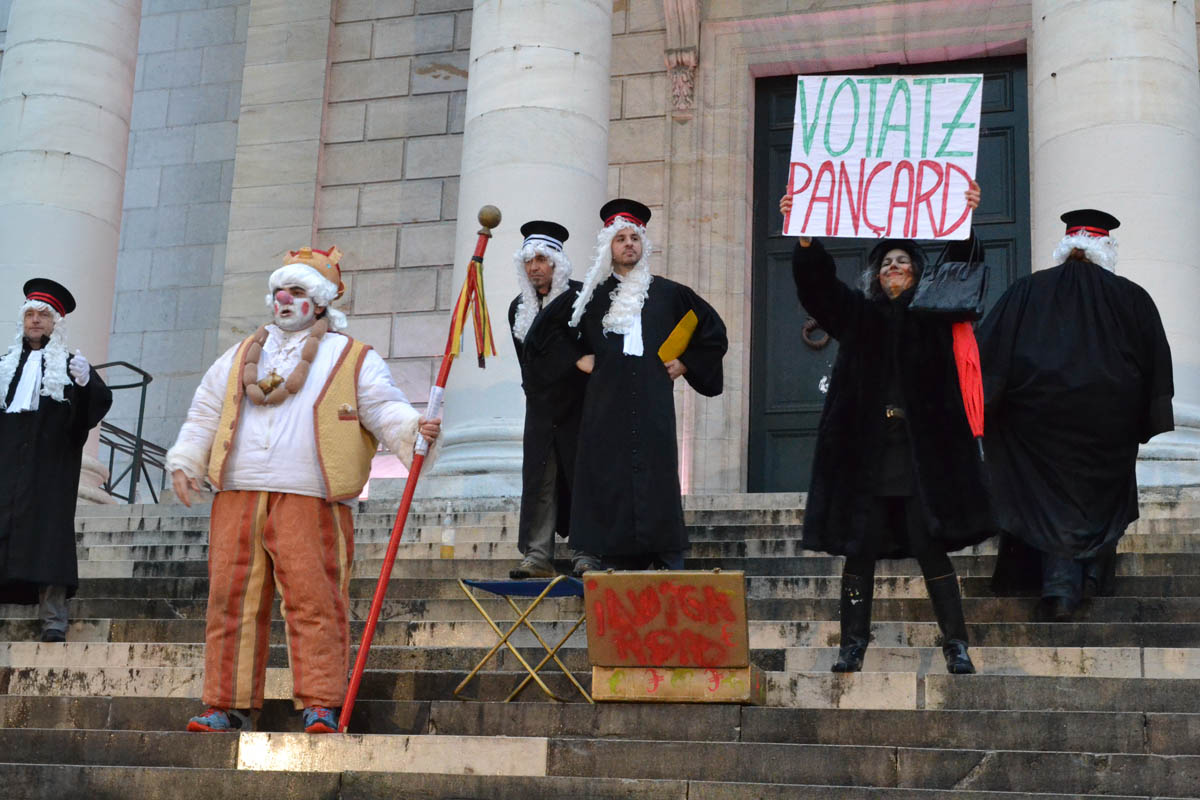
The trial of Sent Pancard during the Carnival Biarnés

The city of Pau is home to many festivals throughout the year, including:

- Carnival Biarnés
- Festival Hestiv'Oc, a "festival of music and culture of the south" established in 2005
- Festival CulturAmerica
- Ciné Cité
- L'Été à Pau [The summer in Pau]
- Festival accès)s(, created in 2000 (electronic culture)
- Festival Amplitudes
- Festival Beta Project
- Festival Bulles d'Afrique
- Festival de danses plurielles
- Festival of the Caribbean
- Festival of Portuguese-language Cinema
- Gay and lesbian film festival
- Board Game Festival of Pau
- Images Mountain Festival
- Festival HIP HOP NON STOP (organised by the Gare-urbaine association)
- Festival Regarder sur les Côtés [Look on the Sides]
- Festival Le Brésil frappe à ta porte
- Festival Mosaïka
- Festival Pau ville Russe
- Urban Session Festival
- Festival Emmaüs Lescar-Pau
- International festival of Film of Pau (1st edition in November 2010)
- Rencontres Internationales de Danse-Rezodanse
- Tremplin Salsa Festival: International competition of Salsa

== Media ==
=== Print ===
The region is covered by three local newspapers dependent on Groupe Sud Ouest:

- Sud Ouest, Béarn and Soule edition
- La République des Pyrénées, (the number one daily of the Béarn)
- L'Éclair des Pyrénées

=== Television ===
- France 3 Aquitaine and its regional variation as France 3 Pau Sud-Aquitaine

=== Radio ===
- France Bleu Béarn, which provides a national joint programme that reflects local programs of the stations in the regions
- NRJ Pyrenees, national music radio with a time slot reserved for local programming (4pm to 8 pm) as well as flashes of morning information
- Virgin Radio Pyrenees, national music radio with a time slot reserved for local programming (4pm to 8 pm) as well as flashes of morning information
- RFM Béarn, national music radio with a time slot reserved for local programming (1pm to 5 pm) as well as flashes of morning information
- Atomic, pop, rock and dance music programming (from September)
- 100% Radio, general music programming and local information
- Radio Inside, pop, rock and dance music programming.
- RPO (Radio Pau Ousse)
- Ràdio País, community radio station dedicated to the Occitan culture
- IMETS (Euro Info Pyrénées Métropole), community radio station dedicated to jazz music

== Sport ==
Pau has many sports facilities and several high level sport clubs.

=== Clubs ===
- Basketball: The professional club Élan Béarnais Pau-Orthez accounts for nine titles as Champion of France (1986, 1987, 1992, 1996, 1998, 1999, 2001, 2003 and 2004), six Cups of France (1991, 1992, 1993, 2002, 2003, 2007), three Tournament of "A"s (1991, 1992, 1993), a week of "A"s (1993) and a title of winner of the Korać Cup in 1984 (European Cup). In 2007, the club climbed into the European top 16. Its results at the end of the 2008–2009 season demoted it Pro B. After a reorganization of its capital, the club changed its name and became the Élan béarnais Pau-Lacq-Orthez (ÉBPLO). The following 2009–2010 season was totally successful with a first place in the regular season (meaning an immediate promotion to Pro-A) and a title of Champion of France of Pro-B won at Paris Bercy against CSP Limoges. Pau-Orthez play its home matches at the Palais des Sports de Pau and former players include Boris Diaw, Mickaël Piétrus and Johan Petro.
- Rugby union: the Section Paloise, club created in 1902 is one of the oldest French rugby clubs. Pau has won three titles of Champion of France (1928, 1946 and 1964), three Cups of France (1939, 1952, 1997) and a European Challenge Cup (2000). Recently, the club participated in two semi-finals of the French Championship (1996, 2000) and a semi-final of the Heineken Cup (1998). The club appeared in the elite Top 16 which became the Top 14, until 2006. It is now in Pro D2, and reached the finals of accession for the Top 14 in 2012 and 2013. Two current French International players, Imanol Harinordoquy and Pau native Damien Traille, once played for the team.
- Canoe-kayak: The Palois university club Pyrénées-Eaux-Vives (CUPPEV) has four champions of very high level: Patrice Estanguet, bronze medalist at the Olympics in Atlanta in 1996, Tony Estanguet, the younger brother of Patrice, triple Olympic champion in 2000, 2004 and 2012 and triple champion of the world (2006, 2009 and 2010), Fabien Lefèvre, double champion of the world (2002 and 2003) and twice medalist at the summer Olympics (2004 and 2008) and Julien Billaut champion of the world in 2006.
- Fencing: Section Paloise is one of the most prestigious clubs in France. Since its creation, in the Quartier du Hédas, many Olympic and world champions are from the club. Since 1959, the Section ensures the continuity of this Olympic discipline with its assets, three global medals, several places of finalists in the World Cup and 26 titles of Champion of France. Fencers are taught the six disciplines of épée, foil and sabre for men and for women, under the leadership of the fencing masters Alain Coicaud, Laurent Vicenty and Michel Salesse. The Section is classified first in clubs of the Southwest in all three weapons and among the best French clubs. The 2005–2006 season was an exceptional year which had several Pau competitors, led by Julien Médard, Gavin Lallement and Romain Miramon, winning national and international individual and team titles.
- Football: Pau Football Club played in the Championnat National from 1998 to 2008 before suffering relegation. After an 8-year stint in the Championnat National 2 (fourth division) Pau FC were promoted back into the French third division in 2016. It hosted many players having completed a successful professional career thereafter. André-Pierre Gignac, Tino Costa, Aurélien Chedjou, Julien Escudé, Édouard Cissé and Xavier Gravelaine have all worn the colours of Pau FC during their career.
- Athletics: CUP, Club Universitaire Palois (also called CUPau), founded on 29 August 1947.
- Handball: Club Pau-Nousty (National 1).
- American football: The Sphinx de Pau, club was created in 1998.
- Baseball and Softball: The Pumas de Pau were Champions of France in 2004 and finalist in 2006.
- Parkour: Association "Shock of Street – Pau Parkour" created in 2010, affiliated with the Federation of Parkour.
- Pyrénéa Sports is a mountain club for mountaineering, rock climbing, hiking, mountain skiing and Alpine skiing and was created in 1939. it organizes the Pyrénéa, the Pau triathlon at Gourette.
- Aerial sports:
  - The Aéro-Club du Béarn, the oldest Aero-Club of France, was founded by Paul Tissandier in December 1908 to approve the flights that the Wright brothers were to perform in Pau. These transferred effectively to Pau from January 1909. The Wright flight school had initially opened at Le Mans in the summer of 1908.
  - The Pau Pyrénées Air Club (CHP), founded in 2004, is a club dedicated to aerobatics, it is located in the Pau Pyrénées airport sheds.
- French Alpine Club: The section of Pau was created in 1886 for mountaineering, hiking, ski mountaineering, canyoning.
- Parachuting: The region of Pau, renowned for its low exposure to the wind, is a centre of parachuting and the focus of several clubs. Pau has hosted several World Championships and is the seat of the ETAP.
- Chess: Being one of the oldest clubs of chess, the Échiquier Henri IV, established in 1925, is the largest club of Aquitaine. It is also one of the 45 clubs to receive, until 2013, the label of trainer of clubs.

=== Facilities ===
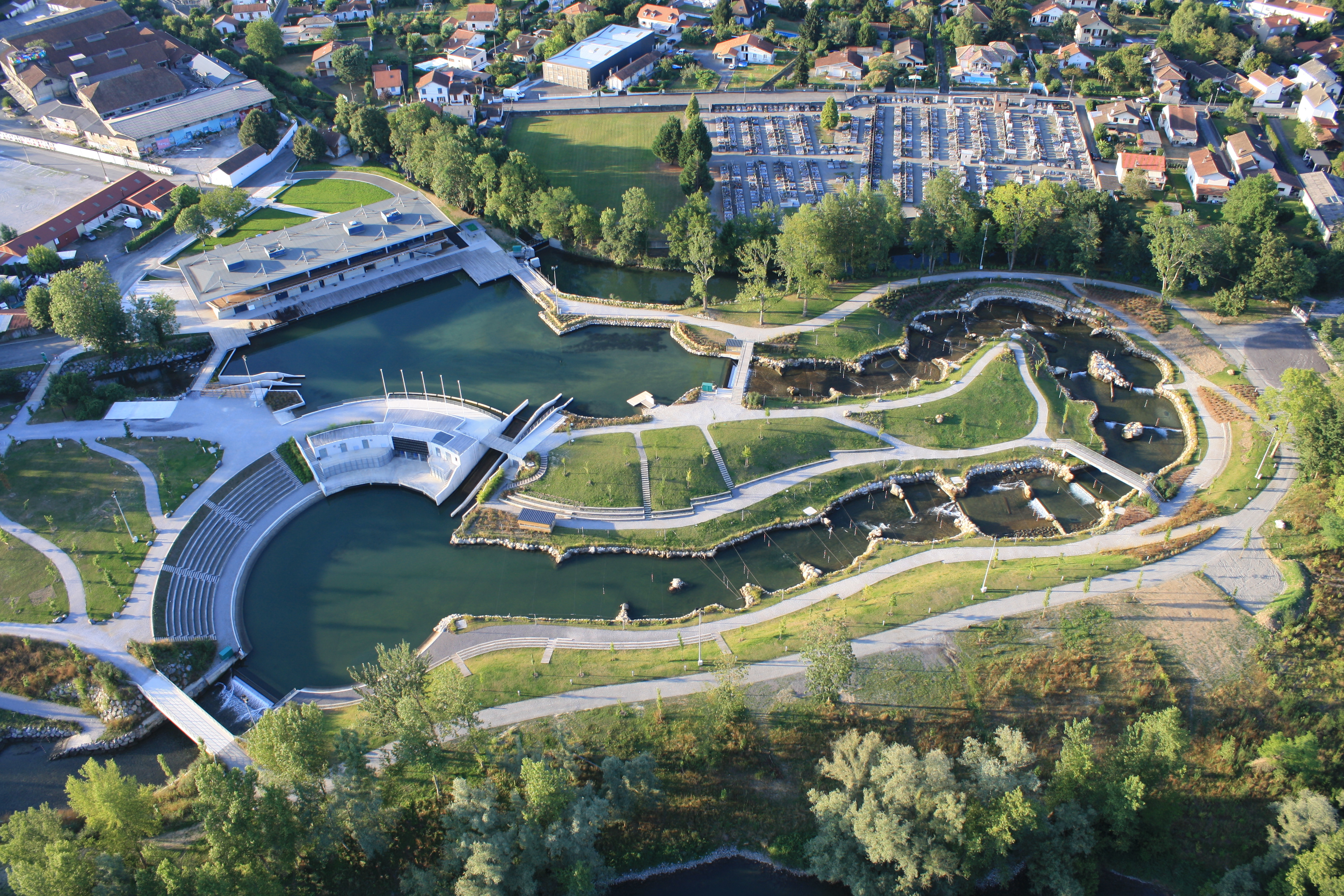
The whitewater stadium

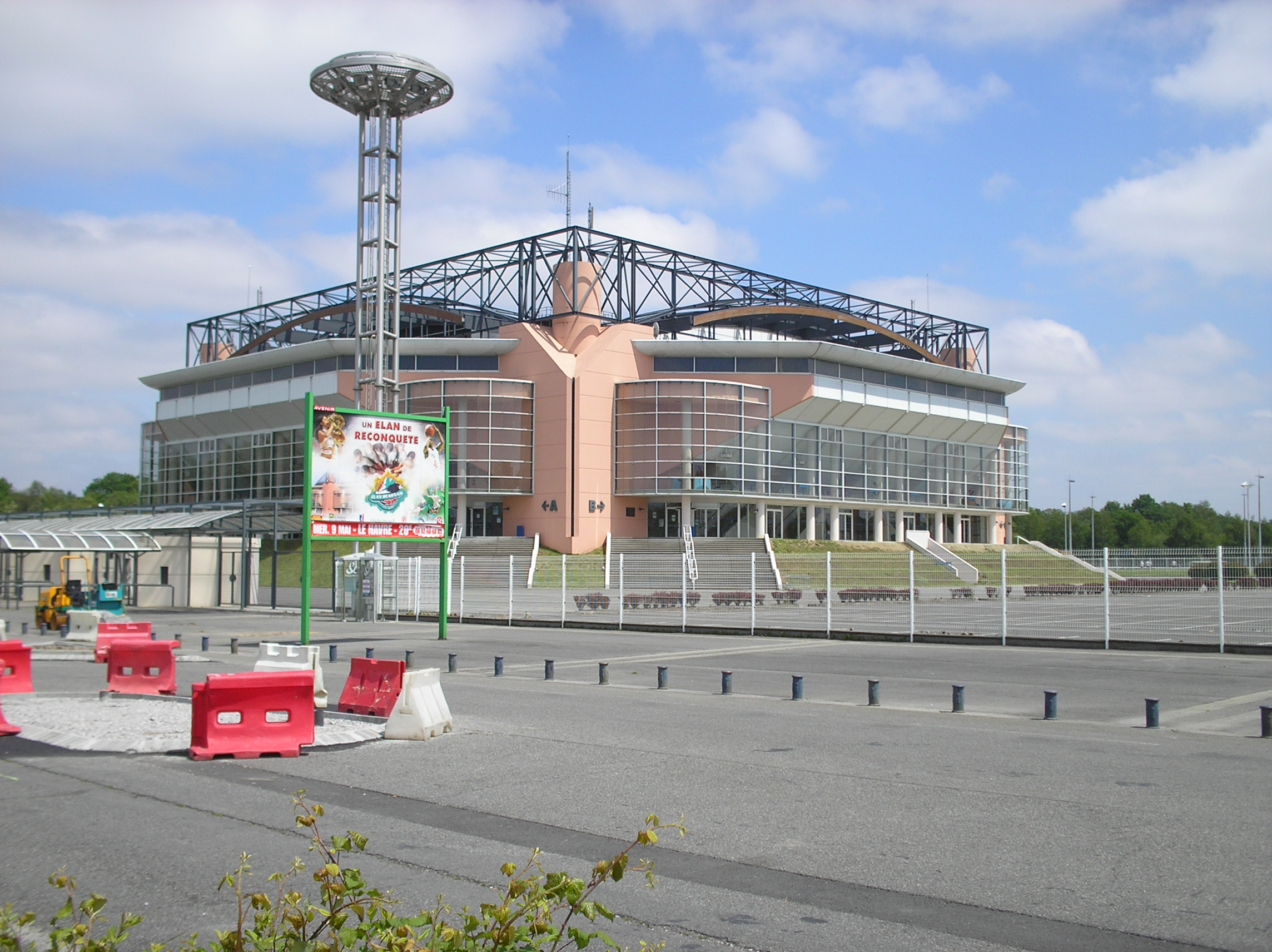
Palais des sports

- The Stade du Hameau [Hamlet Stadium], a 13,966-seat stadium located to the east of the city, home to Section Paloise rugby and Pau PC. The stadium has two covered grandstands, a fitness room and a club house.
- The Palais des Sports de Pau: With 7,856 seats, it is the 2nd largest hall in France after Bercy. The Élan Béarnais home, it has also served in Davis Cup events, at the handball World Championships, the official 1999 European Basketball Championship and the gymnastics Championship of France.
- The Circuit de Pau-Ville, is a temporary motor racing circuit in the streets of the city and which hosts the Pau Grand Prix.
- The whitewater stadium of Pau-Pyrénées opened in 2008. It is a man-made basin fed by the Gave de Pau. It welcomes in particular elite division of the team of France of kayak and the centre of hopefuls. It hosted a round of the World Cup in 2009 and 2012. It will host the canoe-kayak 2017 World Championships.
- The water stadium: This outdoor pool is housed two basins, which is "almost Olympic" (it lacked only a tiny centimetre to be approved), and a diving pool.
- The rugby stadium of the Croix du Prince, historic seat of Section Paloise, in which the youth teams play again today.
- The equestrian field of Sers and the Pont-Long Racecourse: It is the second equestrian centre of France, behind Chantilly and before Maisons-Laffitte for steeplechase. It holds twenty-eight meetings of steeplechase and flat per year. The steeplechase course is one of the most formidable in Europe. The Sers training centre houses six hundred horses.
- The Basque pelota Complex, inaugurated in 2006, is for Jai alai, a mur à gauche, a trinquet and an open place fronton. It is the largest Basque pelota facility in Europe (2,600 seats). This facility is known to be underemployed. The Amateur World Championships of Basque pelota (Basque sport) should have taken place there in 2006 and were held in 2010. Since May 2007, the converted trinquet has reopened to its original sport, real tennis, on Sundays.
- Two golf courses are located near Pau: The Artiguelouve golf course and the Pau Golf Club, located in Billère. Created by Scots and laid out in 1856, it was the first of the European continent and one of the oldest in the world. It offers an 18-hole course and its Victorian-style clubhouse features a restaurant and a bar with a British atmosphere.
- The Plantier de Pau: For the game of Quilles de neuf, an ancestor of bowling, to practice with a 6.2 kilograms (14 lb) ball and nine bowling pins of 96 centimetres (38 in).
- The André-Lavie Stadium, stadium of Pau athletics and for the training of university sports teams. This site held the Interville competition between Pau and Saint Jean de Luz, on 13 August 2007.
- The SUAPS climbing wall: The highest climbing wall of Aquitaine and Midi-Pyrénées, it is a top place of training for Pyrénéan climbers.

A footpath along the banks of the Gave de Pau starts near the château and continues west past the golf course; it is used by joggers. North of the town is the Bois de Pont-Long (also known as the Bois de Pau or Forêt de Bastard).

=== Events ===
Since 1930, Pau has become a mainstay of the Tour de France cycling race, thanks both to its geographical location and to its marvelous infrastructure. Pau hosted its 63rd stage in 2010, and only one other city besides Paris has done better. The 2010 Tour visited Pau on three occasions: First as a passing town, second time as a finish, and the third time as a departure town on the way to the Col du Tourmalet. Pau is behind Bordeaux as the town of the province to have had most stages in the history of the Tour. Pau will receive the Tour for the 75th time in 2024.

Perhaps the highest-profile sporting event is the Étoiles de Pau ("Stars of Pau"). Held annually in October, it is one of only six annual competitions in eventing that receive the highest rating of CCI**** from equestrianism's world governing body, the FEI. It's also the only event of this level in France.

In 2008, between 11 and 23 August, Pau hosted the 83rd French Chess Championship. The men's event was won by Étienne Bacrot, on tie-break from Maxime Vachier-Lagrave, while the women's event resulted in a victory for Sophie Milliet. Thirty-six players took part. Pau was previously the Championship venue in 1943 and 1969.

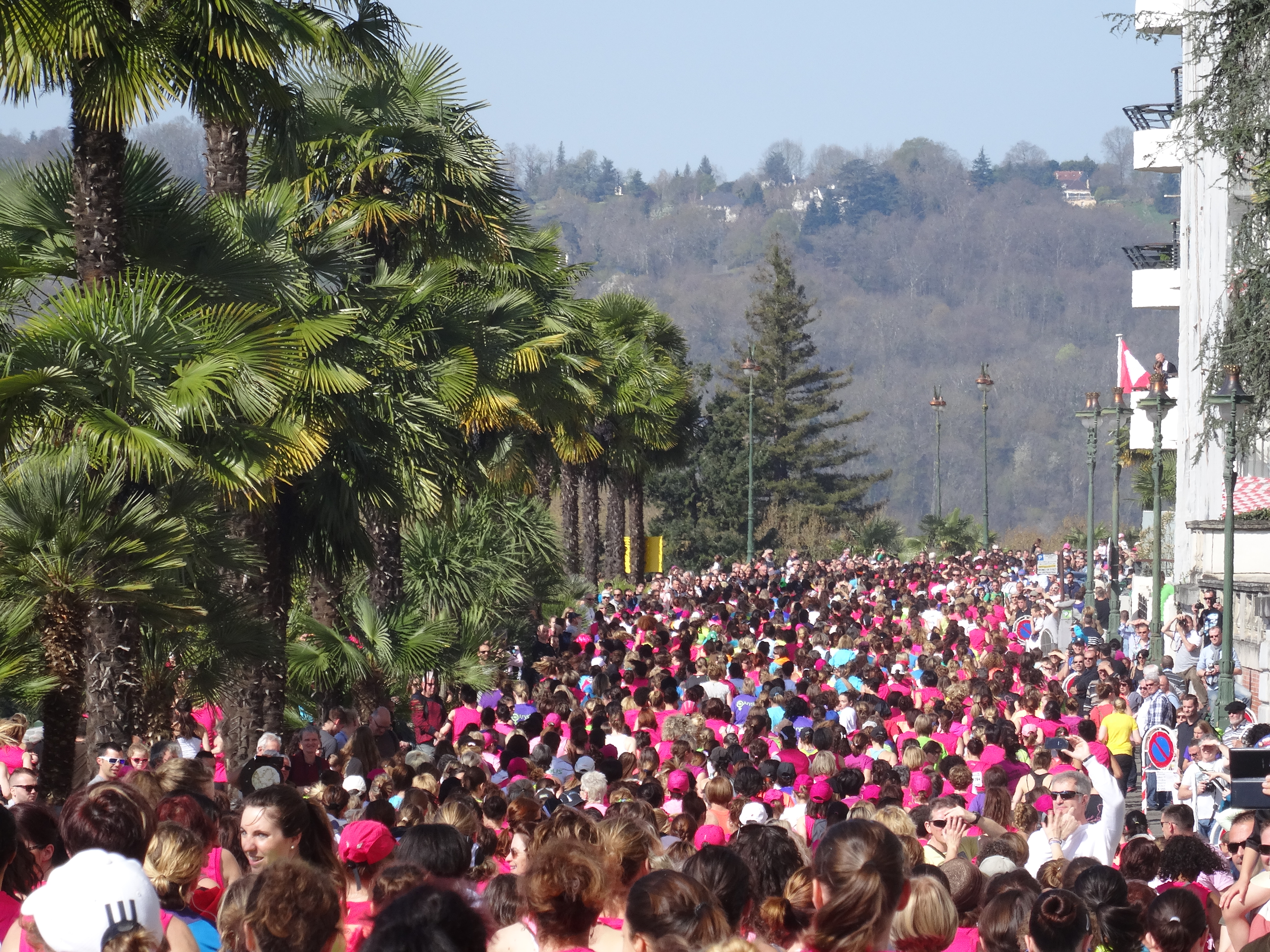
The Féminine on the Boulevard des Pyrénées

Other events include:

- Stages of France's canoeing Championships.
- Marathon de Pau, whose departure takes place every year from the Palais Beaumont.
- The Féminine de Pau, walking race held twice per year from 2012.
- International meeting of capoeira.
- Dance international meetings organized by the Rezodanse association.
- Frequent events such as the Davis Cup of tennis (four times), every November tennis ATP Challenger Tour, the World Championship of handball, the Championship of European nations of basketball, France's Gymnastics Championships, the Championships of France of parachute jumping.

==== Pau Grand Prix ====
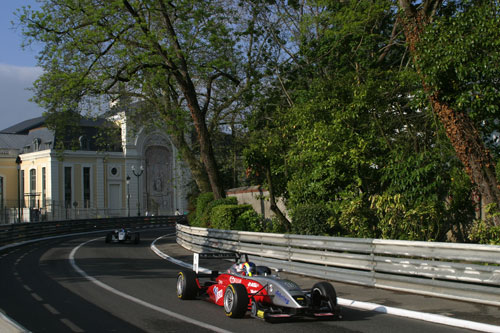
Átila Abreu races his Mücke Motorsport Formula Three car on the Pau circuit in 2005

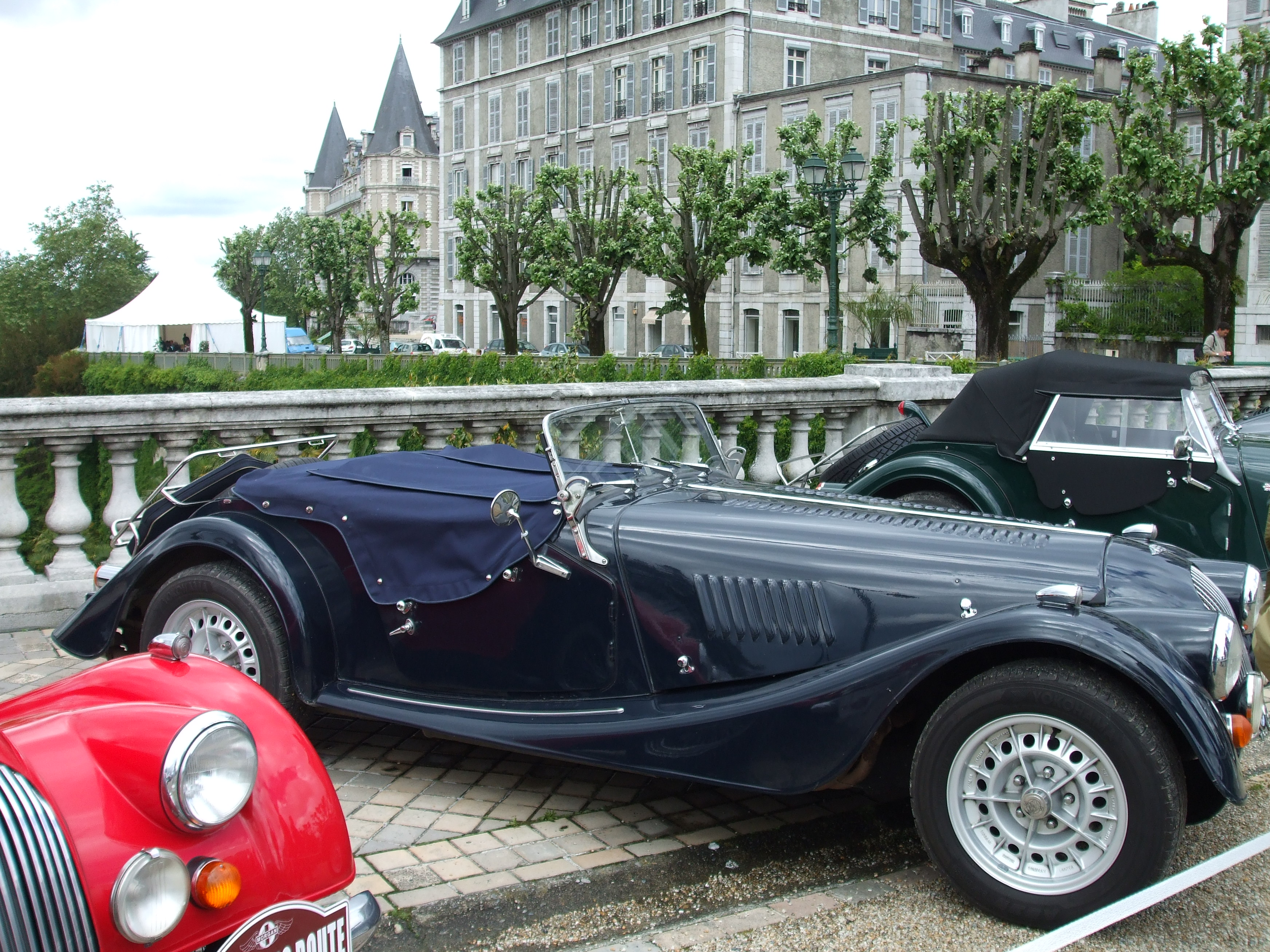
The Grand Prix Historique

Pau held the first race to be called a Grand Prix in 1901. After that the 1928 French Grand Prix was held in nearby Saint-Gaudens, Pau also wanted to arrange the race and in 1930 the French Grand Prix was held on a Le Mans-type track outside the city with Philippe Étancelin winning for Bugatti. Pau returned to the calendar in 1933 with a track in the town centre inspired by Monaco.

The track, 2,769 metres (1.721 mi) long, is winding and has remained largely unchanged. The first curve is the station hairpin. After that the road climbs on the Avenue Léon Say, alongside the stone viaduct that carries the Boulevard de Pyrenées, to Pont Oscar. A tunnel is followed by the narrow hairpin at the Louis Barthou high school that leads the track into the demanding Parc Beaumont section at the top of the town. After the Casino garden and another hairpin, the track winds back to the start along the Avenue Lacoste.

Pau traditionally opened the season but mid-February for the 1933 GP meant the race took place in a snowstorm with slush. After a one-year pause the race was back in 1935 with Tazio Nuvolari dominating in an Alfa Romeo P3 entered by Scuderia Ferrari. The 1936 race saw the only major victory for the Maserati V8-R1, driven by Ètancelin. In 1937 the race was part of the French sports car series with Jean-Pierre Wimille dominating, running three to four seconds a lap faster than the rest of the field. GP racing was back in 1938 and Pau became a test track for Mercedes-Benz before the Grandes Epreuves.

The 1938 race saw René Dreyfus' Delahaye sensationally beating the Mercedes-Benz team. In 1939 Mercedes wasn't to be taken by surprise, Hermann Lang leading the team to a double victory. After World War II Pau continued as a non-championship Formula One race until 1963. Thereafter the race was run to Formula Two rules until 1985, and thereafter by its replacement, Formula 3000. In 1999, the event again changed, with Formula Three cars racing. Finally, in 2007, the race became a round of the World Touring Car Championship.

The Grand Prix de Pau Historique is organized on the Circuit de Pau-Ville once a year, a week before or after the modern Grand Prix, this event brings together vehicles with animated racing of the past.

== Economy ==
From the 1950s to the 1990s Pau depended on the production of natural gas and sulphur which were discovered nearby at Lacq. In the 21st century, the mainstays of the Béarn area are the oil business, the aerospace industry through the helicopter turboshaft engines manufacturer Turbomeca, tourism and agriculture. Pau was the birthplace of Elf Aquitaine, which has now become a part of TotalEnergies. Halliburton has an office in Pau.

Pau is the second economic hub of Aquitaine, after Bordeaux. A university city, it has concentrated several industrial centres and centres of important research in the fields of petroleum engineering and geosciences, petrochemistry and chemistry, food, automotive, aeronautics and computer science.

Pau benefits from its central location in the region of the Pays de l'Adour and its location between two major areas of population: Bayonne/Anglet/Biarritz (160,000 inhabitants) and the area of Tarbes/Lourdes (110,000 inhabitants) and secondary, more diffuse, areas: South of Landes/Dax (90,000 inhabitants) and the areas of Auch (40,000 inhabitants), Orthez/Lacq (30,000 inhabitants) and Oloron (20,000 inhabitants).

The municipality is partially within the Ossau-Iraty AOC area.

- Tertiary functions: administrative (prefecture, general council, etc.), cultural (university), judicial ( Court of Appeal), commercial.
- Science Centre and technology Jean-Feger, of the oil group TotalEnergies (formerly Elf Aquitaine).
- The Euralis Research Centre.
- The Technopoles of Hélioparc, Pau Cité Multimédia and Pole E-Business southern Aquitaine (PEBA).
- Aeronautical and space industry.
- Electrical industry.
- Food and wine industries.
- Fine chemicals and pharmaceutical industry.
- Computer science, NTIC.
- Pau Broadband Country (fibre to the premises).
- Business travel, seminars, congresses.

=== Industry ===
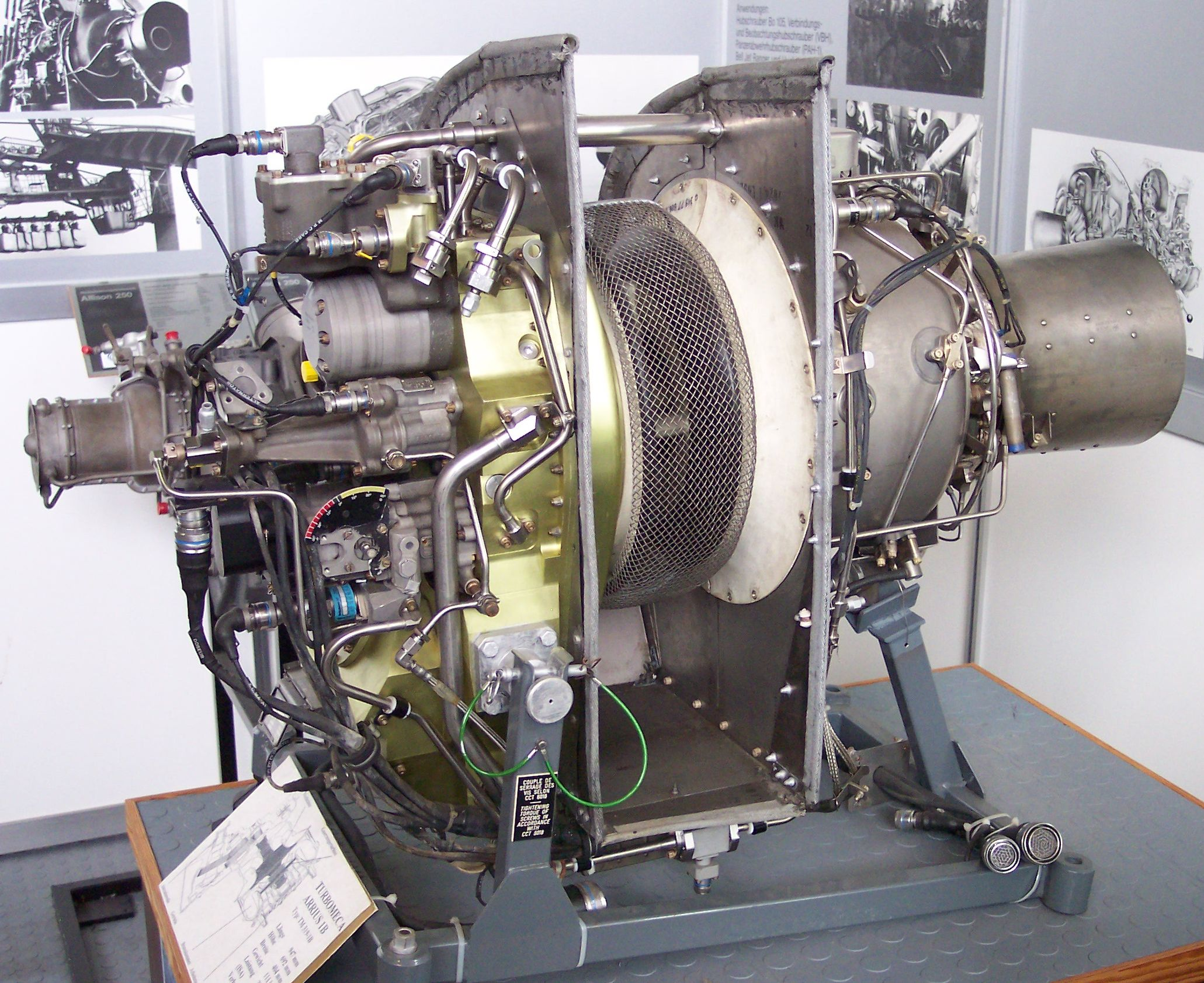
Arrius helicopter engine

Pau experienced an important economic boom based on the discovery of the giant deposit of natural gas in Lacq. Discovered in the 1950s (by engineer Jean Féger), it was then the largest terrestrial deposit of gas in Europe and helped France to be self-sufficient in gas for almost thirty years. The Société Nationale des Pétroles d'Aquitaine (SNPA) was born at Lacq in 1941, after merger with ELF in 1976 it became part of the Elf Aquitaine group, then Total during its integration into the Group TotalFinaElf (in Lacq, known now the SNEAP, Société Nationale Elf Aquitaine Production). Oil and focussed businesses (Total Exploration Production France, TotalEnergies, Total infrastructure Gaz France (TIGF), Schlumberger, Halliburton) and chemical (Arkema, Air Liquide) settled in Pau or the surrounding area (in Lacq at the Chemparc chemical park but also in Pardies and Artix).

The scientific centre of Total in Pau is one research centre for exploration and production of gas and oil in Europe, more than 2,000 people, including 900 doctors and engineers in the geosciences, resulting from the merger of ELF Aquitaine and Total. Research in the geosciences is also based on university partnerships/companies notably with the Federation of research applied to petroleum engineering (IPRA), consisting of teams of research CNRS/University of Pau and the Pays de l'Adour (UPPA) and Total (the IPRA represents 130 teachers, researchers and beneficiaries, an annual budget of 1.5 million euros and six scientific Masters). Research and engineering in the geosciences are also present through specialised companies (CGG, Paradigm Geophysical, TTI, VERITAS, etc.) implanted, for the most part, on the site of the Hélioparc technopole and specialised training centres (IFP Training, NExT-Schlumberger, Wellstaff, Baker Hughes, etc.).

The area of Pau-Lacq is also geared towards fine chemicals (Acetex, now closed) and new materials. High-tech composite materials and nanomaterials have gradually been developed in Béarn with the Carbon Fibre Company (SOFICAR) and the GRL (Group of research of Lacq), one of the main centres of research of ARKEMA.

Industry has also developed recently around new energy investments and other energies: Bio-fuels (manufacturing site of bioethanol from the AB Bioenergy France Company, €150M investment), biomass (cellulose) and the production of electricity from gas (production site of SNET, investment of €400M). One driver of uptake and CO_{2} sequestration process is also underway (industrial investment of €100M).

Ultimately, these activities for fine chemicals and specialties, will ensure the reconversion of the traditional activities of extraction from the Lacq area.

The entire energy complex (Chemparc) now represents 12,000 direct jobs.

Pau is part of the global competitiveness cluster of Aerospace Valley, in the aerospace sector, with Toulouse and Bordeaux. The aviation industry is represented by major industrial groups (Safran, Turbomeca, Messier Dowty, Examéca, MAP, etc.), and a significant number of subcontractors. With Biarritz/Bayonne (Dassault) and Tarbes (EADS Socata, Tarmac), the area of the Pays de l'Adour is strongly oriented towards aeronautics (12,000 jobs). These firms are involved on the Airbus programmes of A380/A300/A330/A320 (landing gear, carbon fibre, welding, aerostructures), Eurocopter (engines, machining parts), Boeing (landing gear) and Embraer. Pau also hosts the service centre of the French Army (ALAT) Tiger helicopters. The airport area in particular (aeropole Pau Pyrénées) is expanding and includes aeronautical and automotive subcontractors.

The pharmaceutical sector is growing and is represented by Pierre Fabre, Boiron, Sanofi and Finorga companies. A bio-health centre grouping of industrial pharmacy and biology was created in 2006 around the Pierre Fabre and DBI enterprises.

The Pau economy is also based on the agri-food industry in the fields of maize, processed products (dairy products, canning, meat) and the wine industry (Group Euralis, Candia, Bongrain, 3A, Michaud and Miot). With 400 researchers, Pau is the first European research centre for maize-growing.

The electronics and electrical engineering sector also has several industrial sites in the Pau agglomeration (Legrand, Arelec, Aquitaine electronics, Siemens).

=== Services ===
Pau also concentrates the regional headquarters of many service companies as capital of the Pays de l'Adour region: The banking sector (CA Pyrénées Gascogne, Banque Pouyanne), insurance (MIF, MSA), construction (Groupe MAS, Cance) and business services (APR, YSA, Vitalicom).

ICT businesses have experienced an important development with the deployment of optical fibre in the agglomeration and the implantation of companies specialising in information technology, networks and image processing. The technopoles [technological hubs] of Helioparc (close to the university, 1,000 jobs), Pau Cité Multimédia (north of the town, 700 jobs) and the @LLEES (Villa Ridgway built in 1905, former headquarters of Elf) concentrate a large number of systems integration and computer engineering information technology consulting schools. Pau should, ultimately, be fully connected to a fibre optic network (Pau Broadband Country) of the agglomeration of Pau-Pyrénées communities which will allow a data transfer rate of 10 to 100 megabits per second (and 1 gigabit per second for some companies) and applications of types such as VoIP, online services and webTV. Pau is the third city in Europe, after Stockholm and Milan, to have developed a very high-speed fibre optic network. The project has cost 30 million euros and has been spread over five years. This network has encouraged the location of French and foreign companies to Pau, which are specialised in imaging, services or design online.

Pau combines all the functions and administrative headquarters of a regional agglomeration: General Council of Pyrénées-Atlantiques, Court of Appeal for the departments under the purview of Pau (Pyrenees Atlantiques, Landes and Gers), the regional hospital, Chamber of commerce and industry of Pau Béarn, Chamber of Trade of Pyrénées Atlantiques, Chamber of Agriculture of Pyrénées Atlantiques, SDIS 64, Université de Pau et des Pays de l'Adour. The Chamber of commerce and industry of Pau Béarn manages the Pau-Pyrénées airport, the Groupe ESC Pau, the consular hotel, the CNPC and the IPC de Pau.

In 2006, the Chamber of Commerce and Industry of Pau Béarn had 11,000 industrial and commercial companies registered as headquartered in Pau.

Pau is also a city of congress, symposia and business travelers with infrastructure allowing it to host national and international events. The Palais Beaumont Congress Centre, a casino, a park of exhibitions and 4-star hotels (Parc Beaumont Hotel, Villa Navarre Hotel) all help to provide this infrastructure.

The town of Pau is home to many corps of the army. The 5th regiment of combat helicopters (RHC), which was the first regiment of France to be equipped with the new Eurocopter Tiger, the school of airborne troops (ETAP), the staff of the special forces land brigade, its air component (DAOS), and the central military administrative archive (Bernadotte Barracks) office. The defence sector represents a little more than 2,000 direct jobs in Pau.

=== Tourism ===
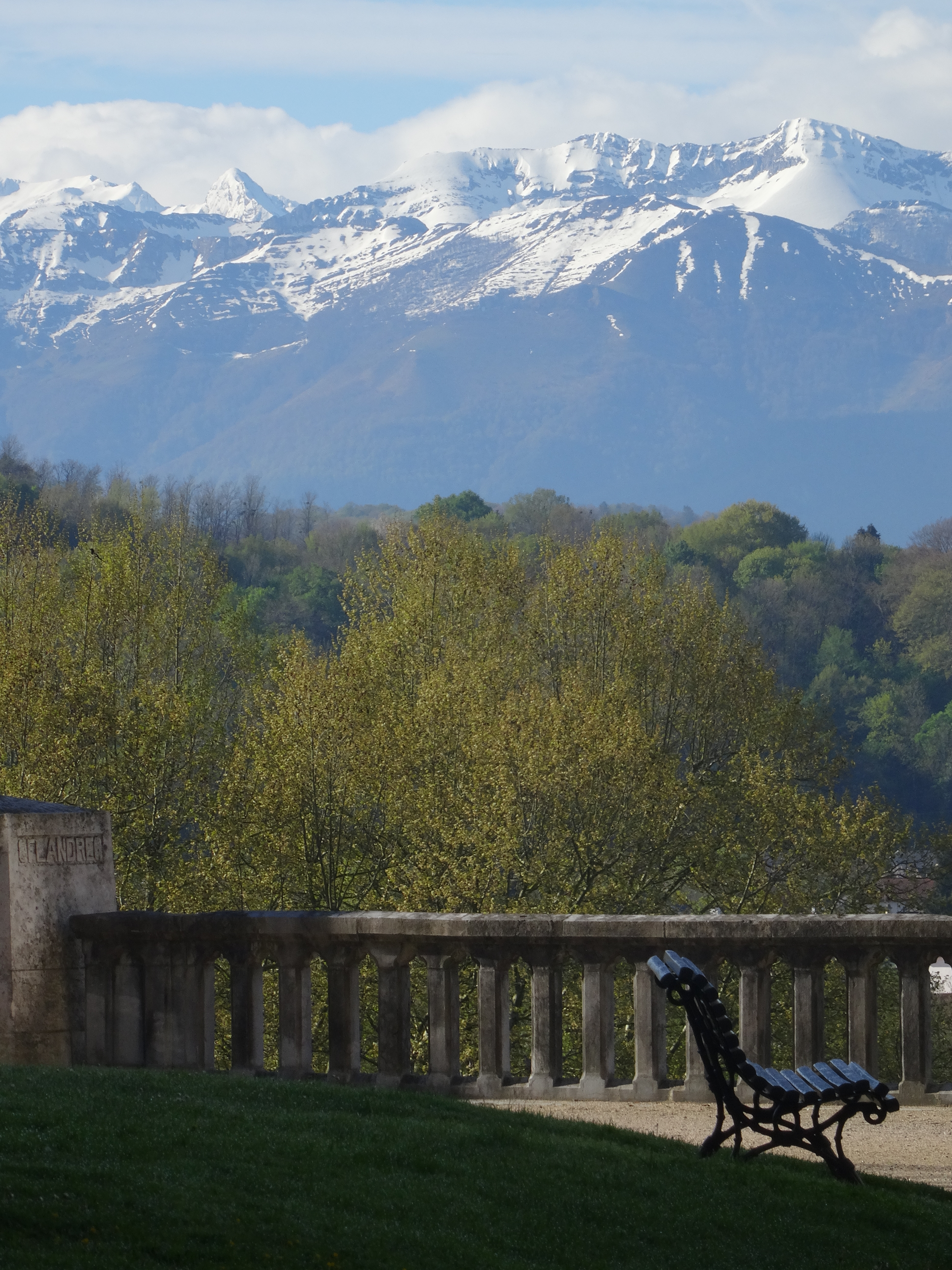
The view from the Boulevard des Pyrénées

The town of Pau is located 45 minutes from the Pyrenees and its ski resorts. It is a holiday resort for tourists to the Pyrenees (hiking, climbing, skiing) and Spain. Located near the Basque and Landes coasts (an hour's drive), it is possible to practice water sports (surfing, diving, sailing, etc.).

Pau is the gateway to the five Béarnese valleys (the Ossau Valley, Vallée d'Aspe, Vallée de Barétous, the Vallée de l'Ouzom and Vath-Vielha) that receives winter sports tourists (the ski resorts of Gourette, Artouste, Le Somport and La Pierre Saint-Martin), spas (Eaux-Bonnes and Eaux-Chaudes) and green tourism (white-water sports, cultural and gastronomic tourism).

Its location at the foot of the Pyrenees gives Pau a view of the mountain range, in particular from the Boulevard des Pyrénées, an avenue 1.8 kilometres (1.1 mi) long facing the Pyrenees.

Pau is the most beautiful view of Earth from the world as Naples is the most beautiful view of sea.

— Said by Lamartine, of Pau's unique mountain panorama

Pau, a former royal town and capital of Béarn, is also a city of cultural tourism and important business (Congress, conferences, notably in the Palais Beaumont). The city, a former climatic health resort, also hosts a casino (the Casino de Pau).

The city is historically closely linked to the United Kingdom and remains popular with the British on holiday. The British discovered Pau and its climate, and left their imprint when Wellington left a garrison there in 1814. He defeated Marshal Soult at Orthez (some 40 km (25 mi) to the north-west) on his way into France from Spain towards the end of the Peninsular War. Vacationing British began arriving before the railway established the Boulevard des Pyrenées. The first full 18-hole golf course in Europe, created by people from Scotland, and in fact located at Billère, was laid out in 1856–1860 and is still in existence, and also a real tennis court. Spanish people are also very present in the city, as well as Portuguese and Moroccans (consulates of Spain and Portugal). The Germans and Dutch, attracted by the climate of Pau and its heritage, are also more and more numerous.

== Transportation ==
=== Train ===
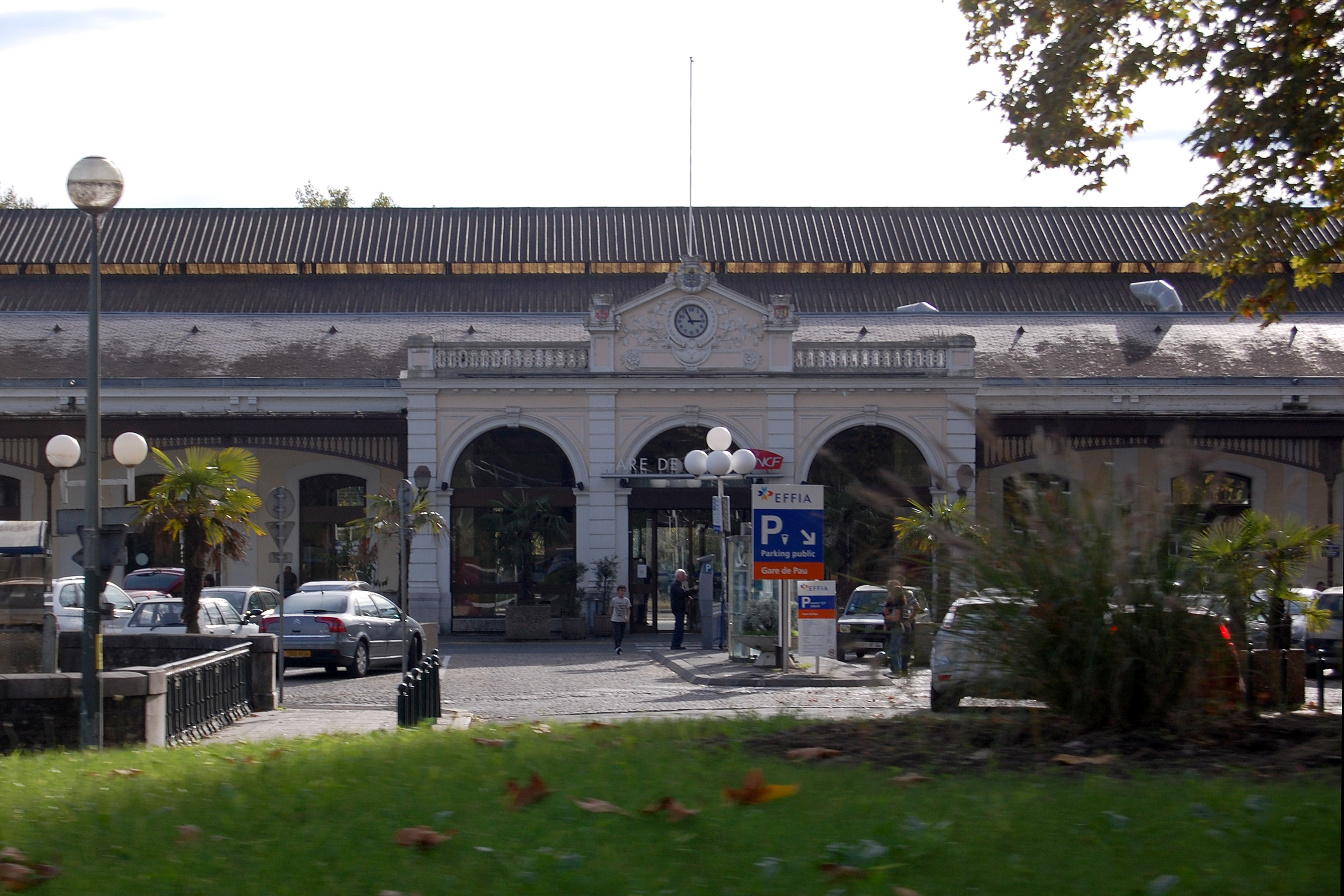
Gare SNCF de Pau (Pau SNCF railway station)

The railway station Gare de Pau offers connections to Bordeaux, Bayonne, Toulouse and Paris, and several regional destinations.

- The TGV linking Paris-Montparnasse to Tarbes with Pau at 5hrs 10 m – 5hrs 30 m from Paris.
- Intercités linking Bordeaux-Saint-Jean to Tarbes and Hendaye/Irun (Spain) to Toulouse-Matabiau.
- The night Intercités linking Paris-Austerlitz to Tarbes or Hendaye/Irun to Geneva-Cornavin (Switzerland).

Two railway construction projects are under consideration: the extension and renovation of the line rail network France current online high-speed TGV from Bordeaux to Spain via the east of Landes (which would put Pau at about three hours from Paris) and the reopening of the cross-border link Pau-Canfranc (Spain) linking Pau to Zaragoza. La Croix du Prince station in the southern part of the town has rail connections to Oloron-Sainte-Marie and Bedous.

=== Airport ===
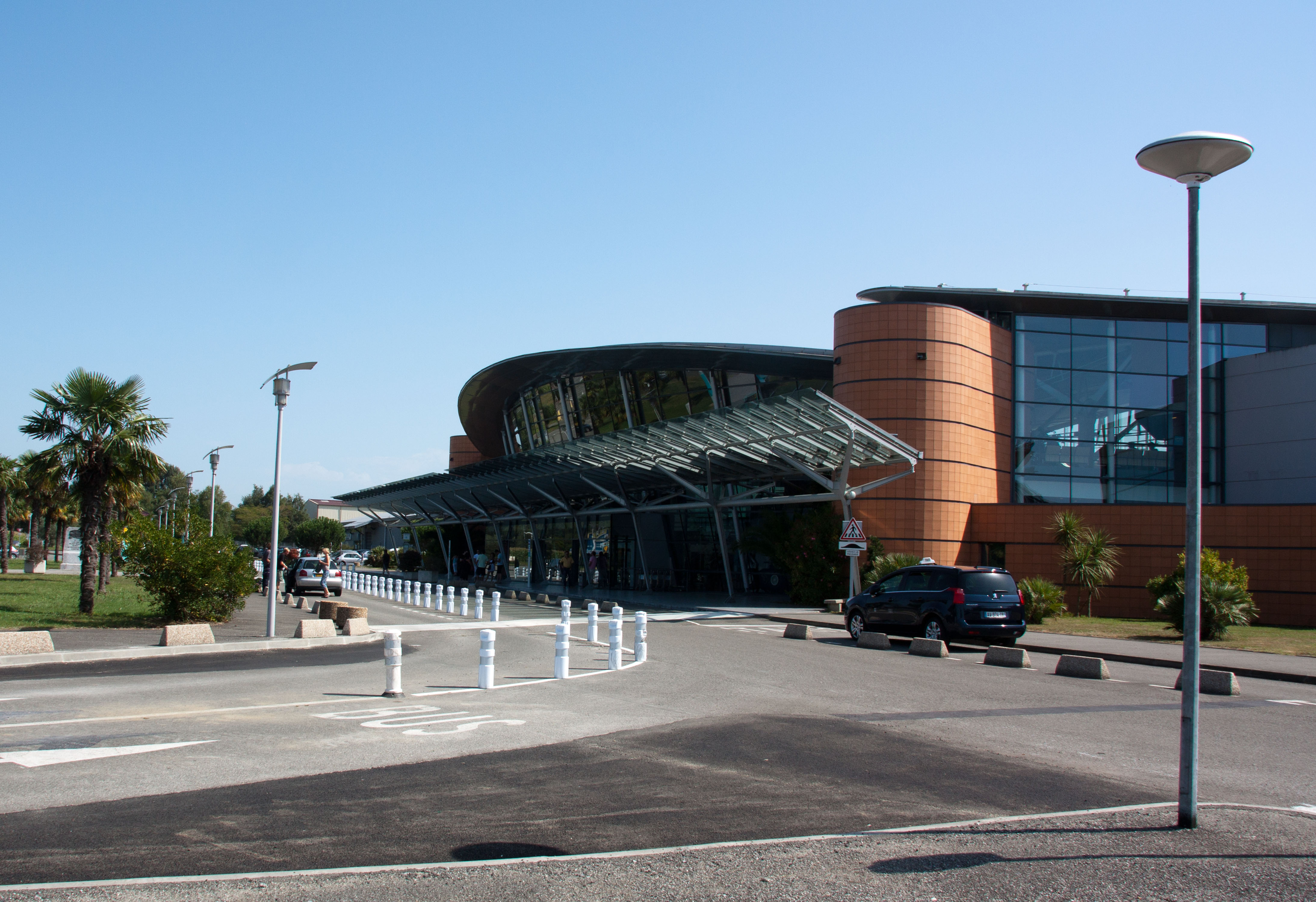
Pau-Pyrénées International Airport

The international airport of Pau-Pyrénées, located 12 kilometres (7.5 mi) to the north-west in the commune of Uzein, is connected directly to Paris Charles-de-Gaulle and Paris-Orly, as well as airports in Marseille, Lyon, London, Southampton and Amsterdam, among other destinations. In 2009, it recorded 690,000 passengers, a decrease of more than 15%, making it the third busiest airport in Aquitaine after Bordeaux and Biarritz airports.

=== Motorways ===
- The A64 (European route E80) called la Pyrénéenne, joins Toulouse to the east in 2hrs 5 m, and Bayonne in 1hr 17 m to the west.
- The A65 (European route E07) called A'Liénor – autoroute de Gascogne connects Pau to Bordeaux in 2hrs 21 m via the A62 between Bordeaux and Langon, a point of connection of two motorways. Its inauguration took place on 16 December 2010. The A65 autoroute is the most expensive in France, with a toll of 14.67 cents/km (April 2015).

=== Funicular ===
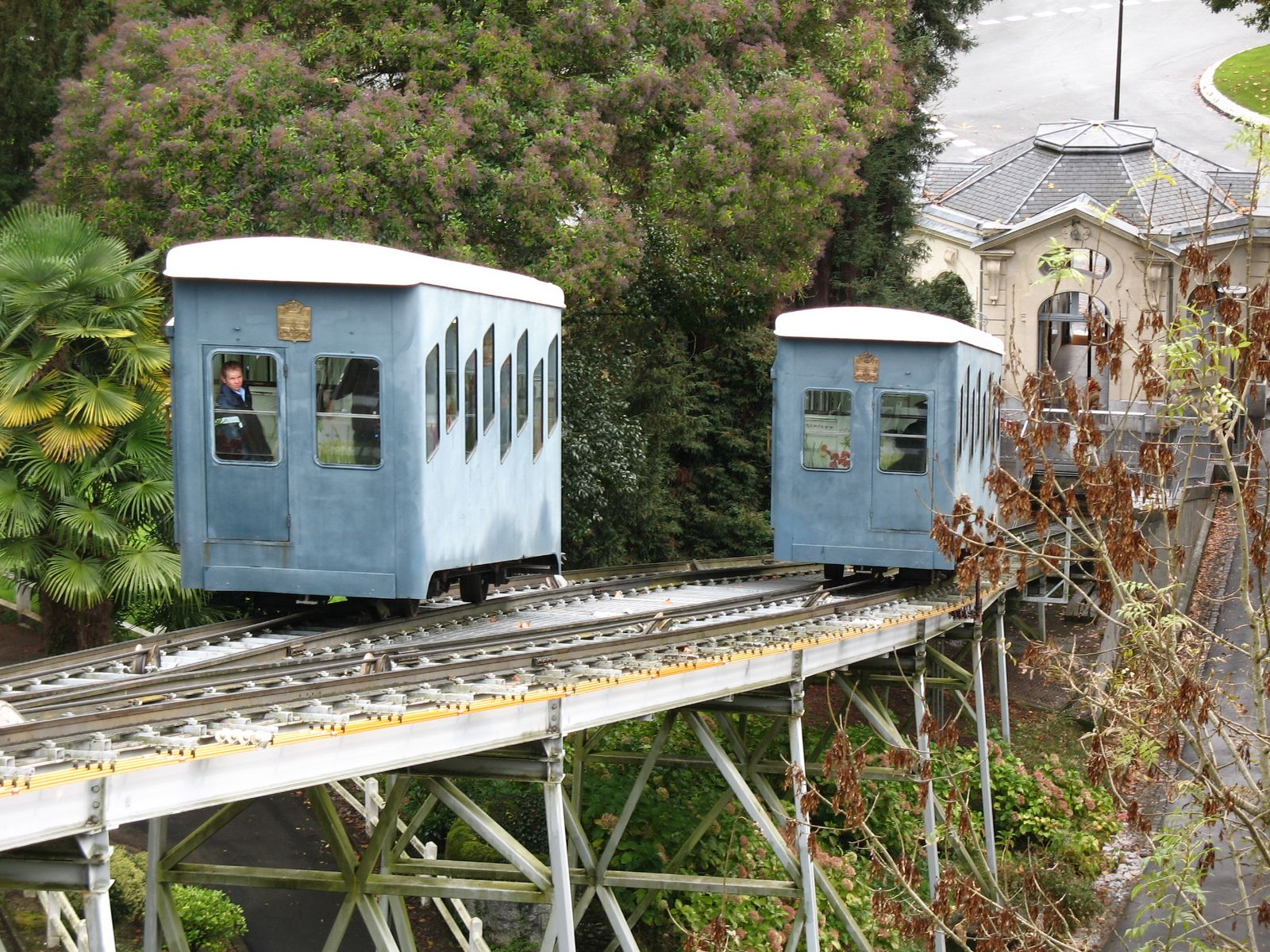
The Funiculaire de Pau

The Funiculaire de Pau, opened in 1908, provides, free of charge, a link between the city centre and Boulevard des Pyrénées to the railway station in the valley. After a year of refurbishment to standard, service resumed on 25 November 2006. It carries an average of 500,000 passengers per year. It works every day and its hours are Monday to Saturday, from 6:45 am to 9:40 pm and Sunday from 1:30 pm to 8:50 pm.

=== Bus ===
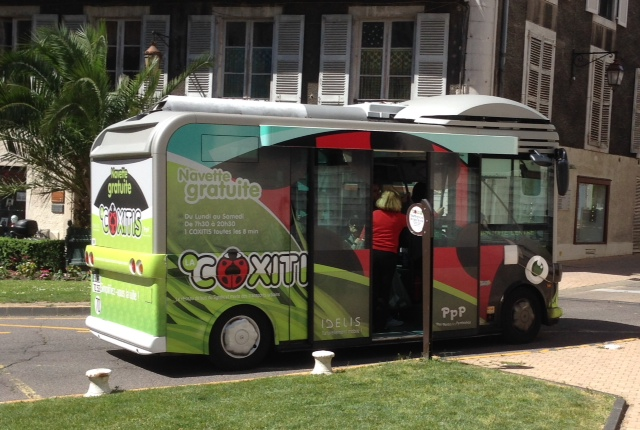
The free shuttle bus, Coxitis, circles the city centre

The Société des Transports de agglomération Paloise (STAP) or IDELIS bus network, operates 13 urban bus routes, serving Pau and the adjoining communes of Billère, Jurançon, Gelos, Mazères-Lezons, Lescar, Lons, Bizanos, Gan, Ousse, Sendets, Lée, Idron, Artigueloutan, Uzein, Morlaàs, Serres-Castet and Aressy. A free shuttle bus service, Coxitis, circles the city centre at brief intervals from early morning to early evening.

The main stops are at Pôle Bosquet and also at the markets, the Place de Verdun, the SNCF railway station and the Auchan shopping centre.

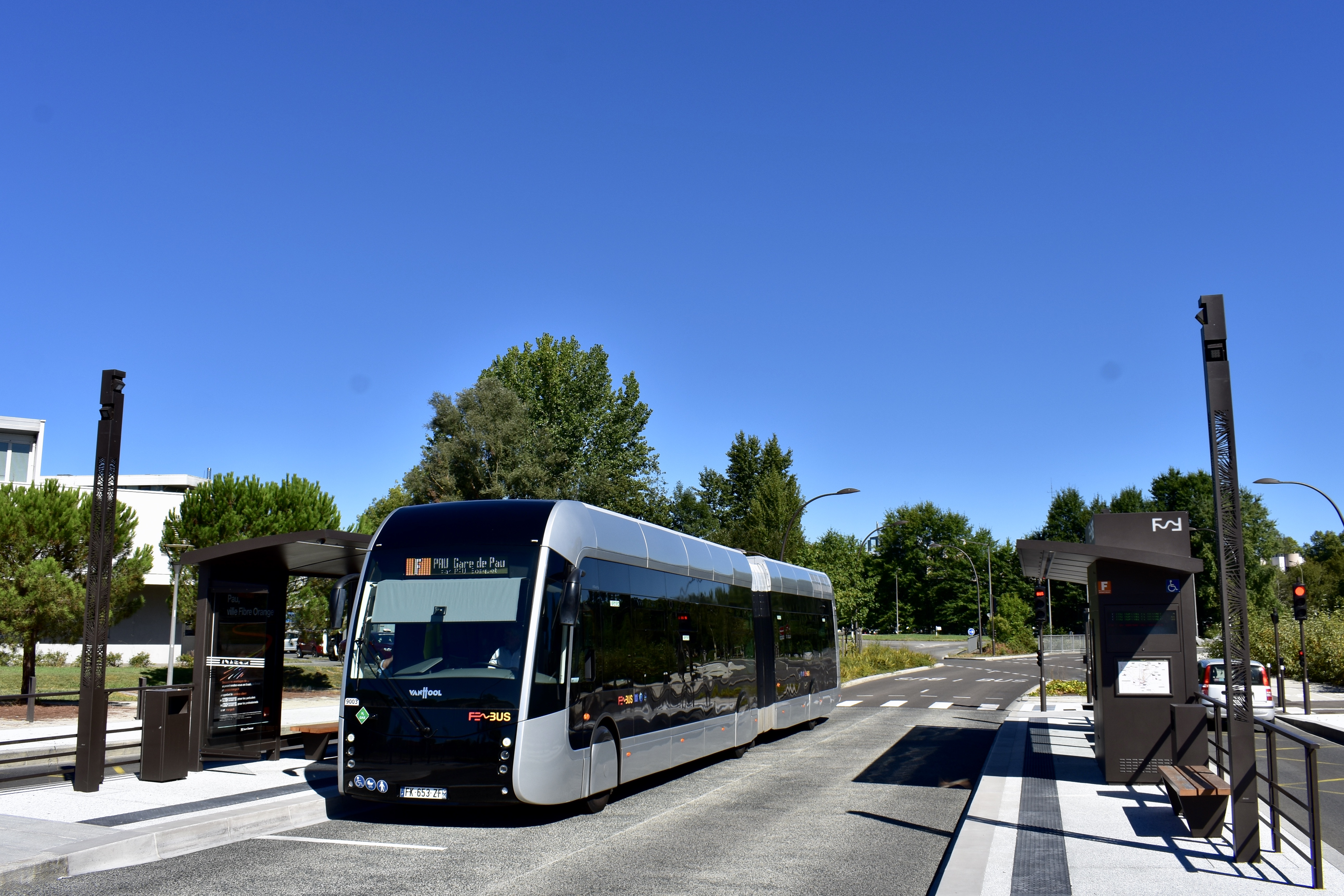
IDELIS Bus network

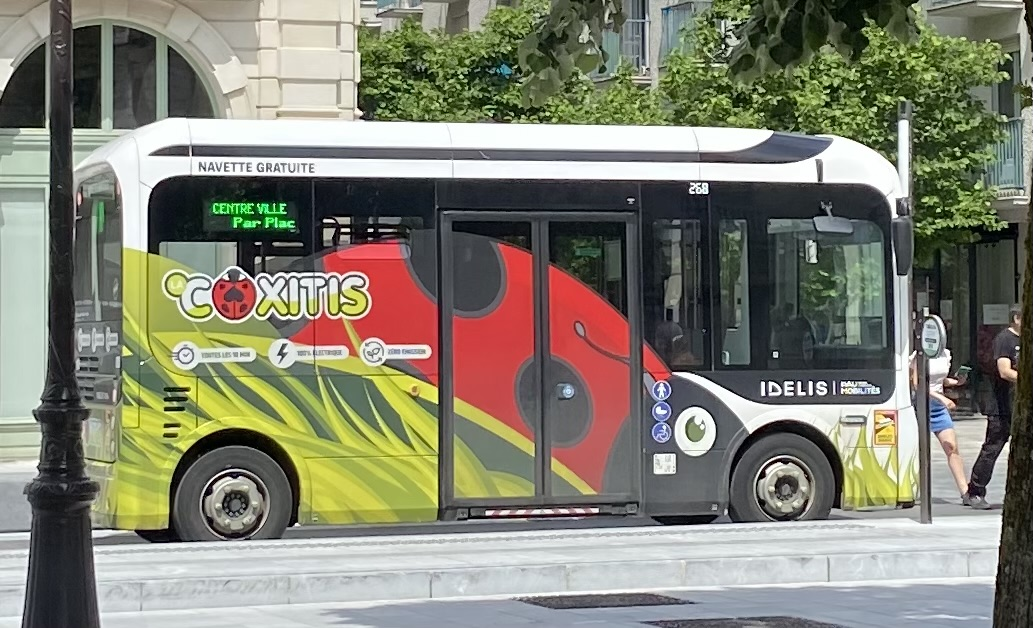
Coxitis Free Shuttle in the city centre

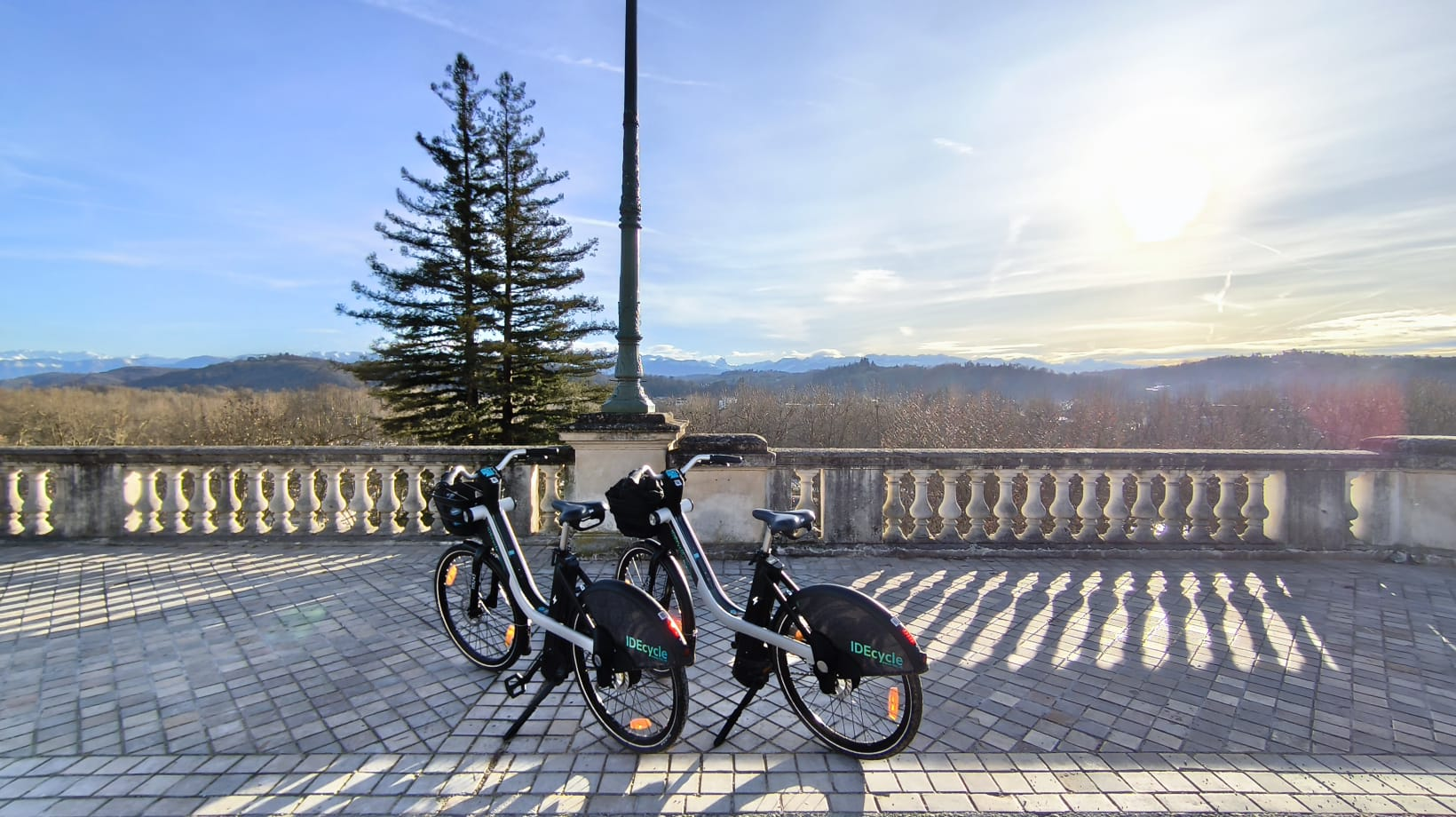
IDEcycle Cycle sharing service

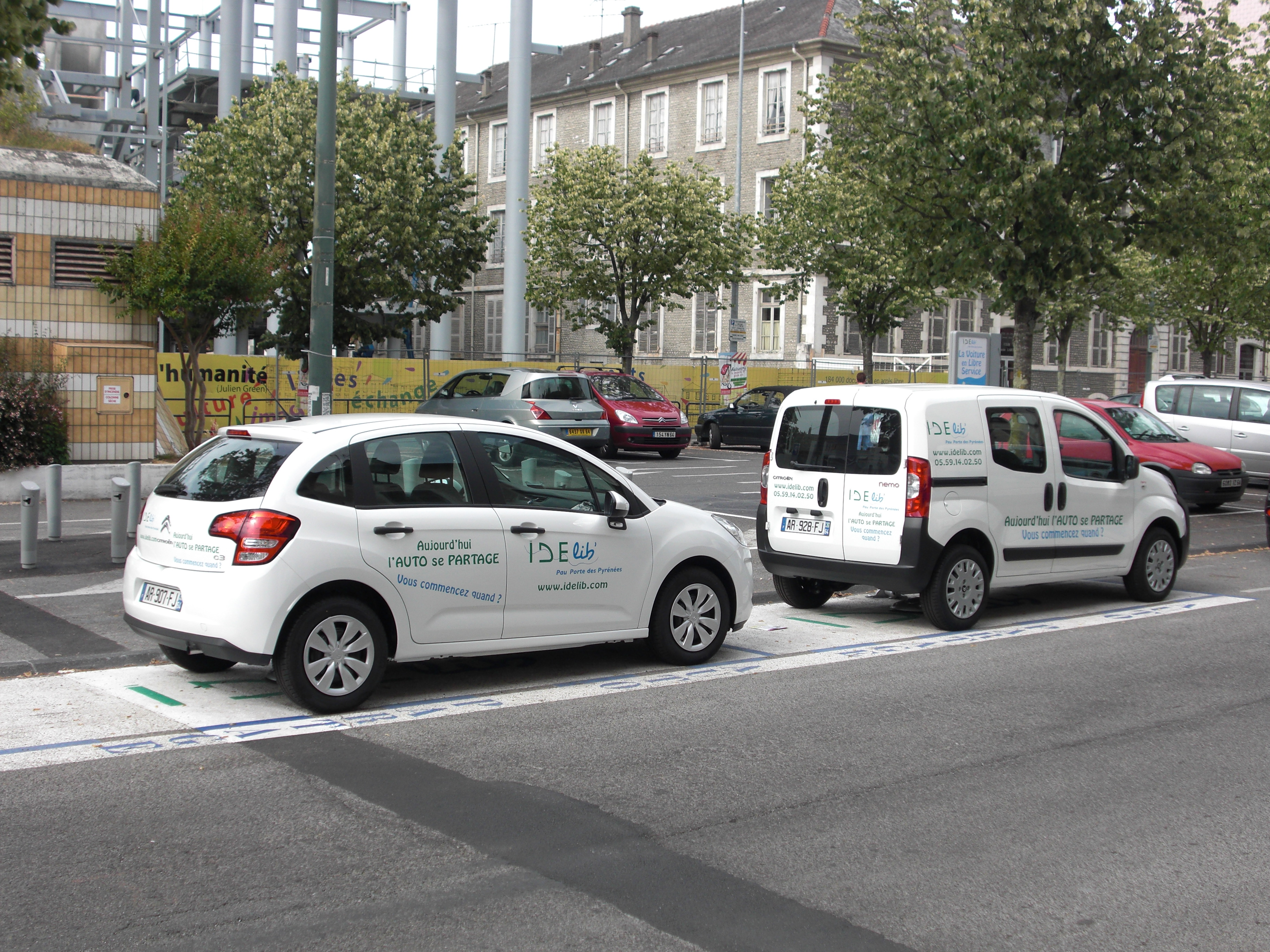
IDElib
Carsharing service (service stopped)

The connections between the departmental and regional routes are at the Pôle Bosquet, since August 2006:

- Rue Mathieu-Lalanne
- Boulevard Joseph-Barbanègre

The city is engaged in a Bus à haut niveau de service [Bus to high level of service] (BHNS) project for a first route, the railway station to the hospital. Work started towards the end of 2014.

== Heritage ==
Pau has a heritage which stretches from the 12th to the 21st century, which is represented through numerous sites and monuments, including the castle of Henri IV.

=== Religious monuments ===
==== Main Catholic churches ====
- The Church of Saint-Martin is situated in the centre of the old town, on Rue Henri IV. It was designed according to the plans of the architect Émile Boeswillwald. The construction of the church, of neo-Gothic influence, began in the 1860s. Every Sunday, the automatic carillon of St. Martin peals the notes of Eine kleine Nachtmusik and the Twelve Variations on "Ah vous dirai-je, Maman", by Mozart.
- The Church of Saint-Jacques, also of Gothic influence, regained its two spires in 2012. Following the ancient chapel of the convent of the Cordeliers, it was completed in 1867. Its spires had been removed in 2001, due to being weakened by a storm in 1999.
- The Notre-Dame Church is capped by a monumental statue of the Virgin and child of Art Deco inspiration. The church was built in the first half of the 20th century, in continuity with the ancient church dedicated to the pilgrimage which came before.
- The Church of Saint-Joseph was designed by the architect Jacques Laffillée. It was built in 1935. Neo-Byzantine style, it is recognizable because of its domes and its bell tower, which is 50 metres (160 ft) high and of reinforced cement.
- St Peter's Church was built in 1970. It was designed by the Prix de Rome architect André Remondet. Largely covered with slates, it has married its modern structure with concrete buildings which surround it.
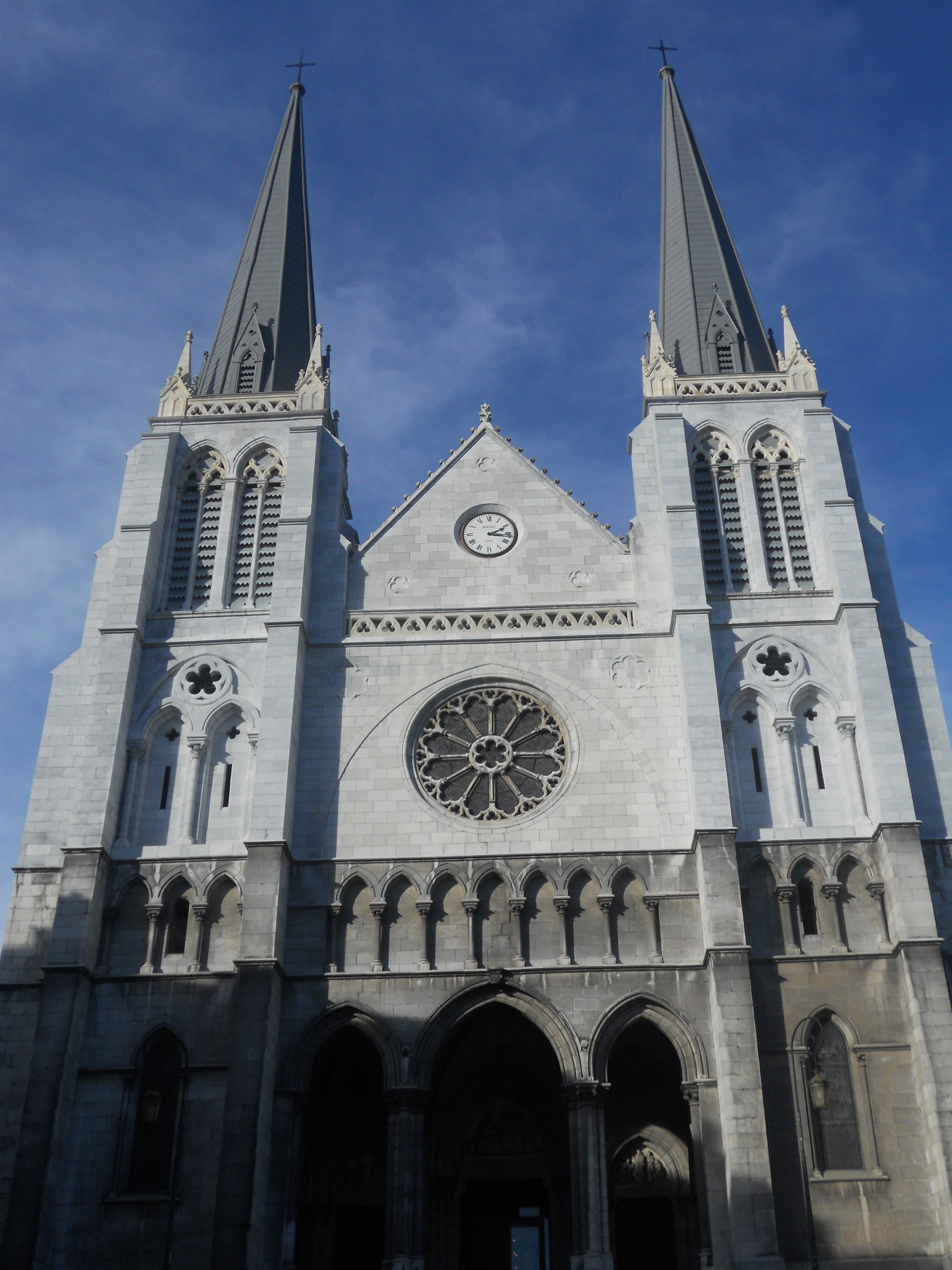
The Church of Saint-Jacques in Pau

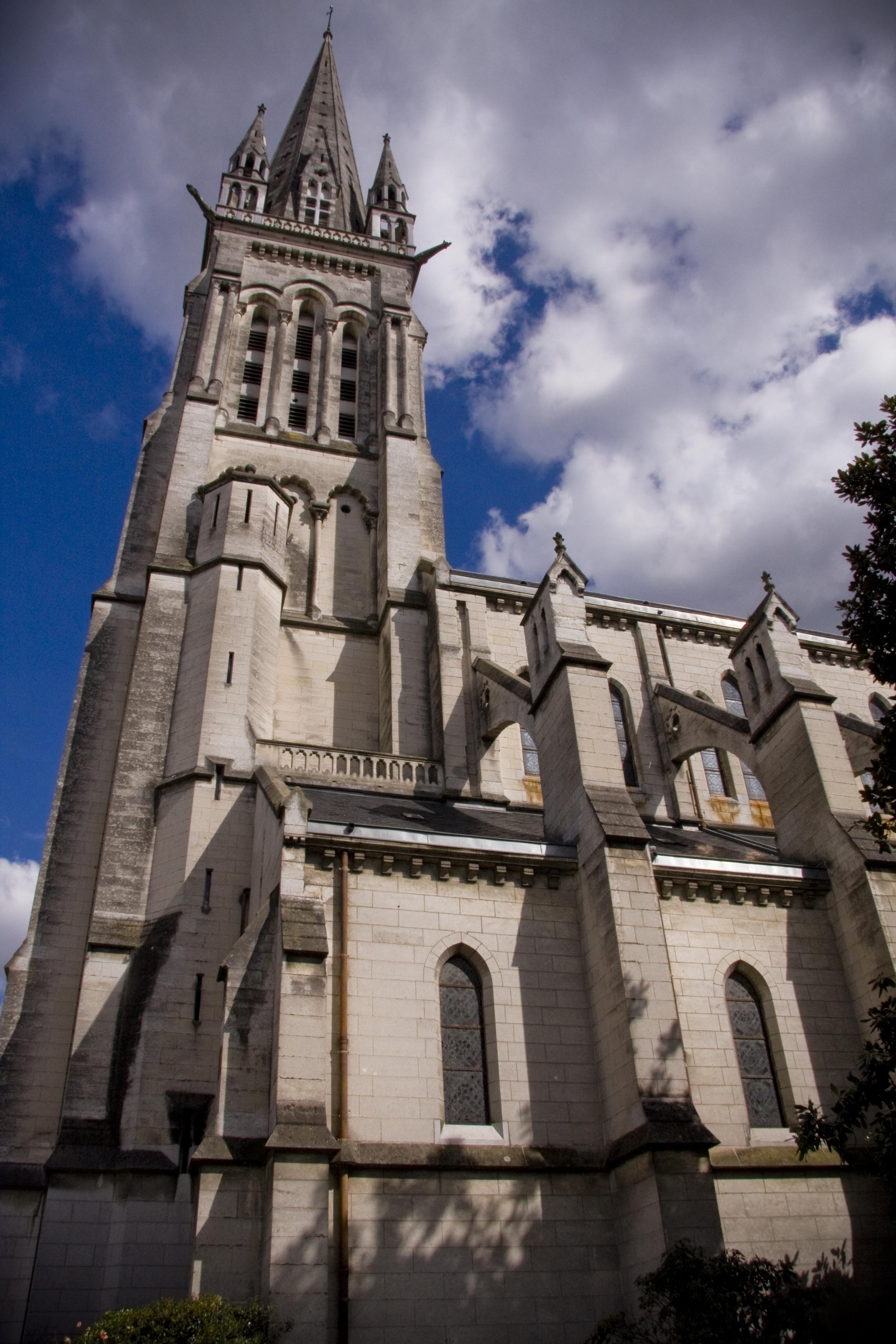
The Church of Saint-Martin in Pau

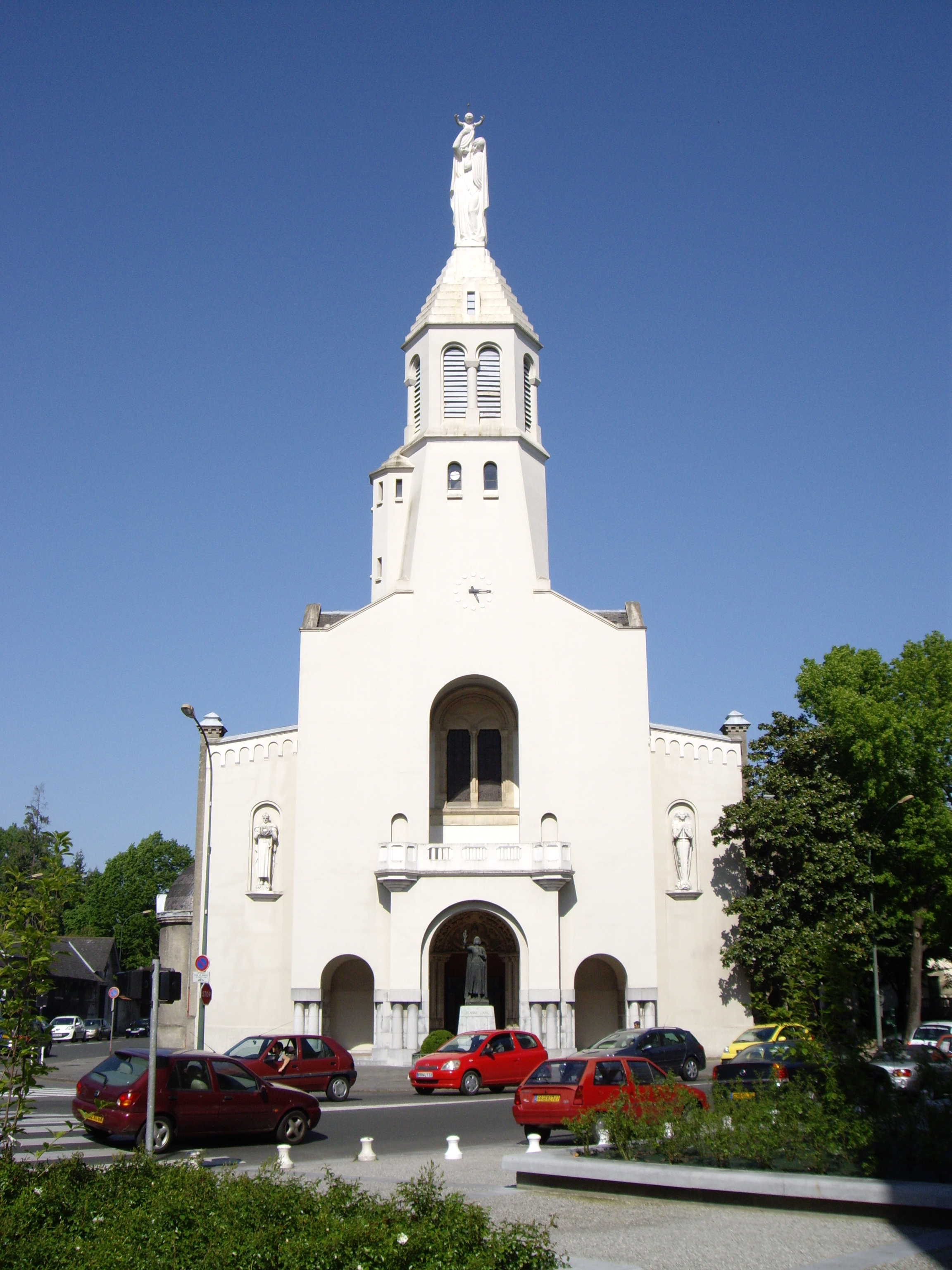
The Church of Notre-Dame

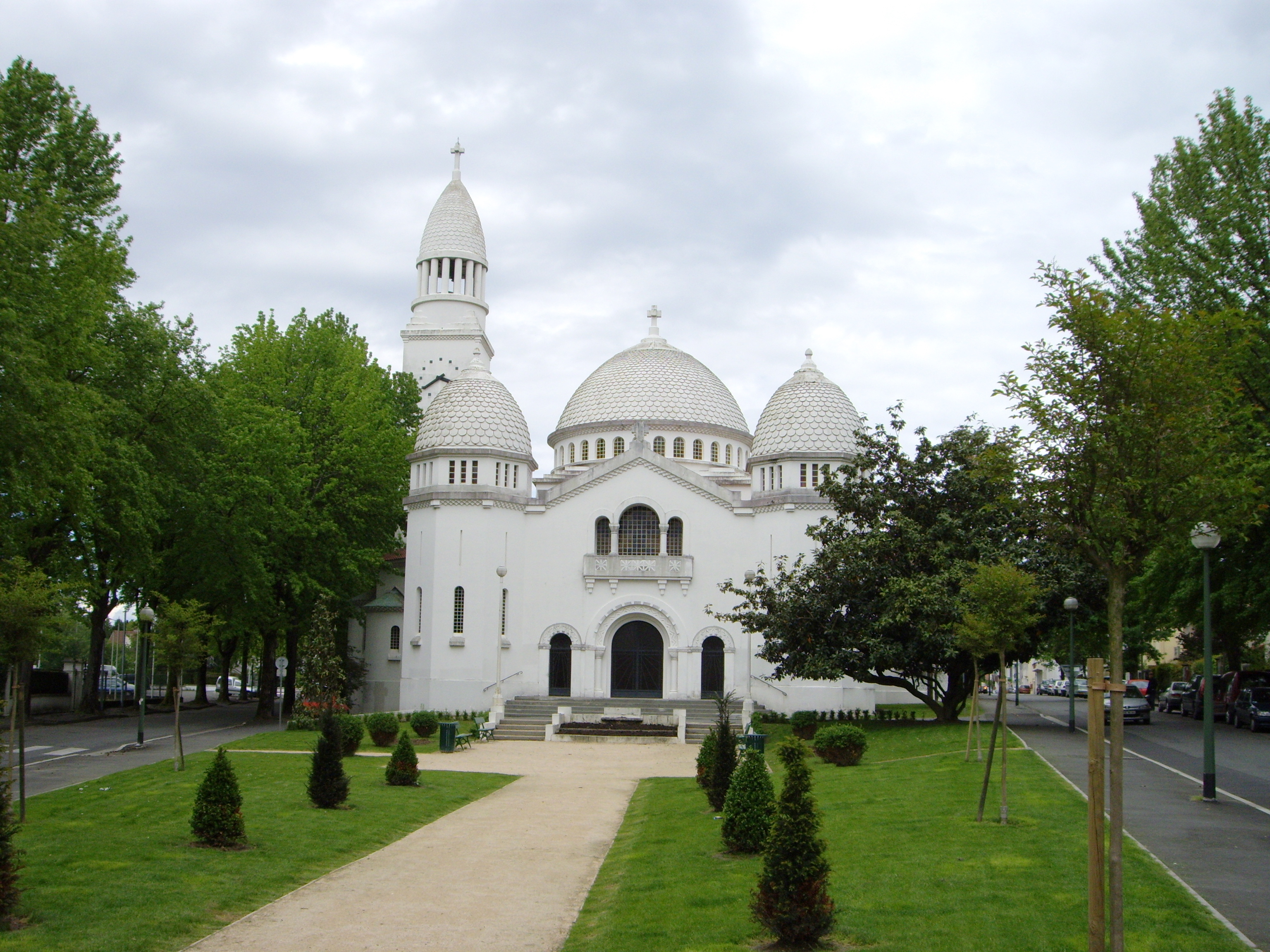
The Church of Saint-Joseph

==== Outstanding Catholic chapels ====
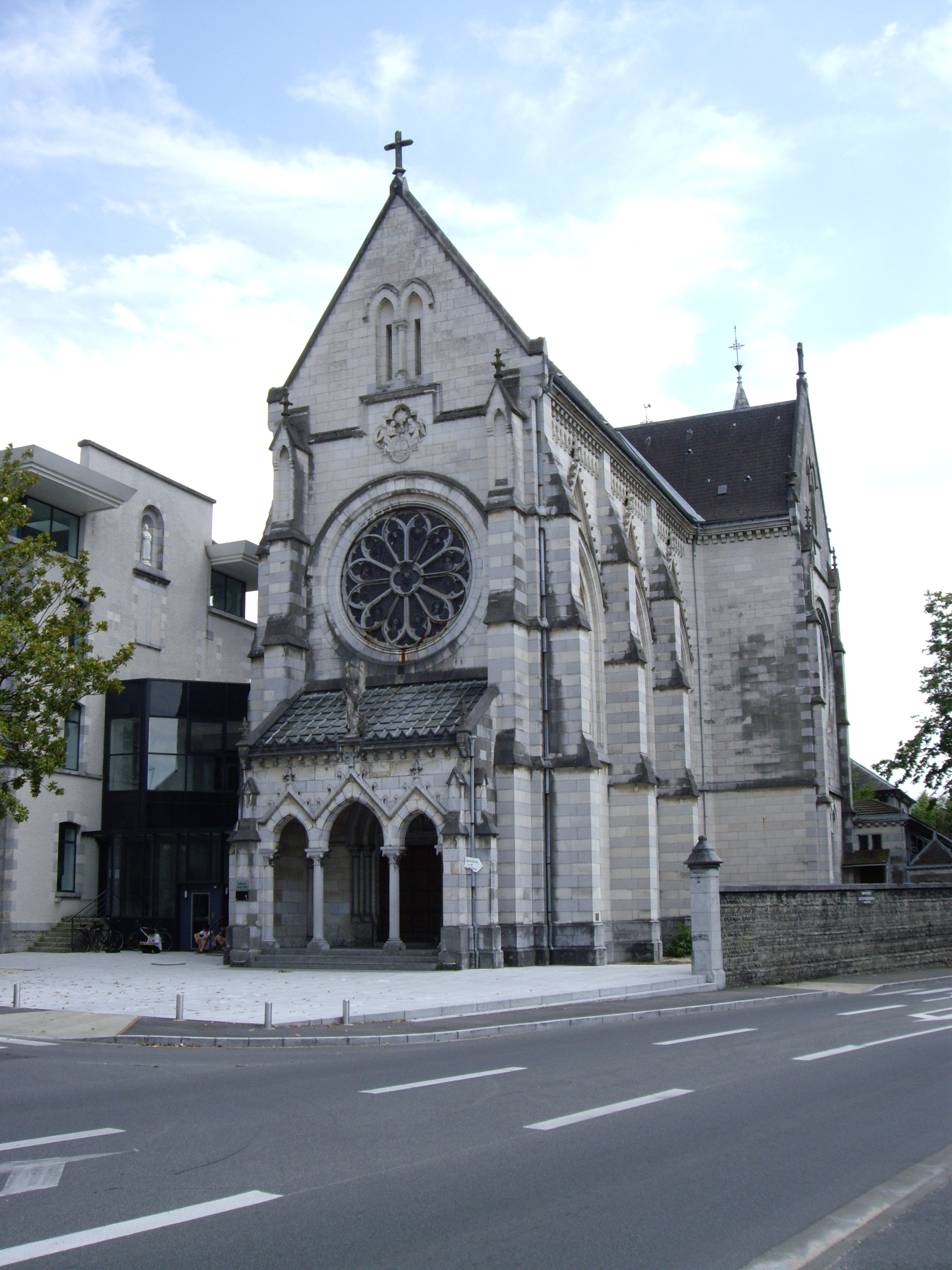
The chapel of the Convent of Réparatrices

- The former Convent of the Réparatrices, an imposing chapel, now houses the National School of Music and Dance and combines ancient and contemporary architecture.
- The Chapel of Saint-Louis-de-Gonzague, classic architecture, accompanied by the establishment of a college of Jesuits (current Lycée Louis-Barthou). Begun in the 1660s, it was not completed until 1851.
- The Chapel of Notre-Dame-du-bout-du-Pont, the former place of worship of the Ursulines de Pau, was built in 1872 and relocated in 1932. The Ursuline convent was, in fact, demolished to give space to the Palais des Pyrénées on the current Place Clemenceau. The chapel was dismantled stone by stone (each being numbered) and then rebuilt at its present location across the Gave de Pau.
- The Chapel of the Château de Pau, visible from the main entrance, is adjacent to the brick keep.

==== Reformed, Anglican and Presbyterian churches ====
- In the 16th century, slaughterhouses were constructed along with the Protestant temple of Pau, the cagots worked on the two buildings.
- Responding to demand from English residents, Christ Church was built on the Rue Serviez from 1837 to 1841. Since then, it has become a Reformed temple.
- Similarly, the Anglican Church of Saint Andrew was built in 1866. The rectory is known to be shaped according to local taste, the façade is dotted with pebbles from the Gave de Pau.
- The Méliès Cinema was housed in a former place of worship, a Scottish Presbyterian Church.

==== Other religious buildings ====
Pau has a Russian Orthodox Church, a mosque, a synagogue and a number of smaller churches such as St-Jean-Baptiste, Sainte-Bernadette and Sainte-Thérèse.

=== Civil monuments ===
==== Until the 18th century ====
The Château de Pau dominates the Gave de Pau. Its two oldest towers date from the 12th century. The quadrangular tower of brick was raised by Sicard de Lordat in the 14th century. Thus constituted fortress was turned into a Renaissance palace by Marguerite d'Angoulême and then restored under Louis-Philippe and Napoleon III. In summary, the castle was fortress of the Viscounts of Béarn, Castle of Fébus, birthplace of the good King Henry IV (Nouste Enric) and royal residence in the Renaissance.

A first defensive tower desired below the castle by Gaston Fébus, then called the "Tour du Moulin" [tower of the mill] for a time, was built along a water channel operating the mill of the castle as early as the 15th century. The Tour de la Monnaie [Money Tower] was named according to Henri d'Albret who, in 1554, used it as a mint. Today containing a lift within, it was used for the coinage of money until the French Revolution.

Its small garden was tended by Marie Antoinette when she spent her summers in the city. Napoleon used it as a holiday home during his period in power. The château has been designated as a French historical monument and holds a collection of tapestries.

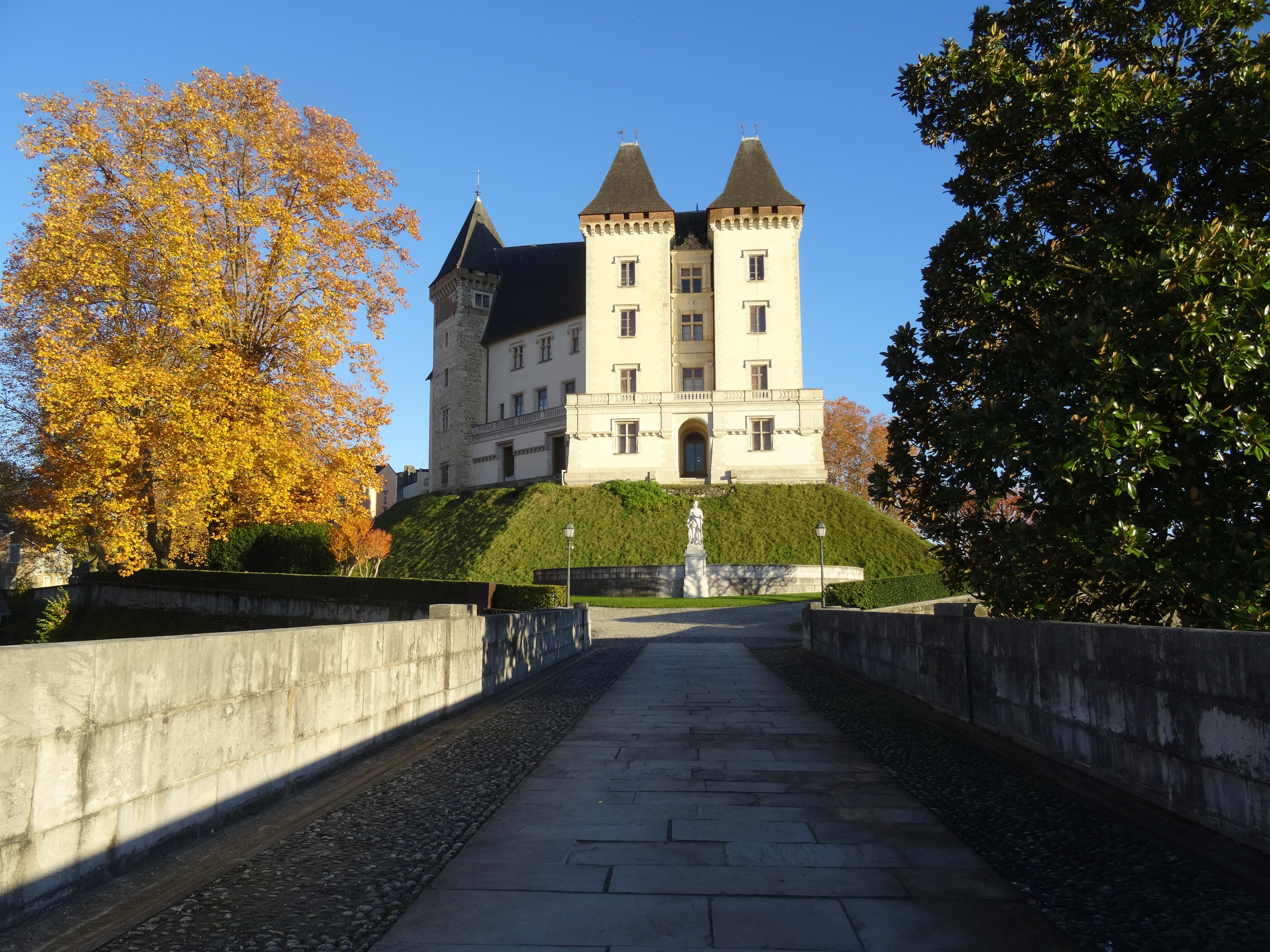
Château de Pau

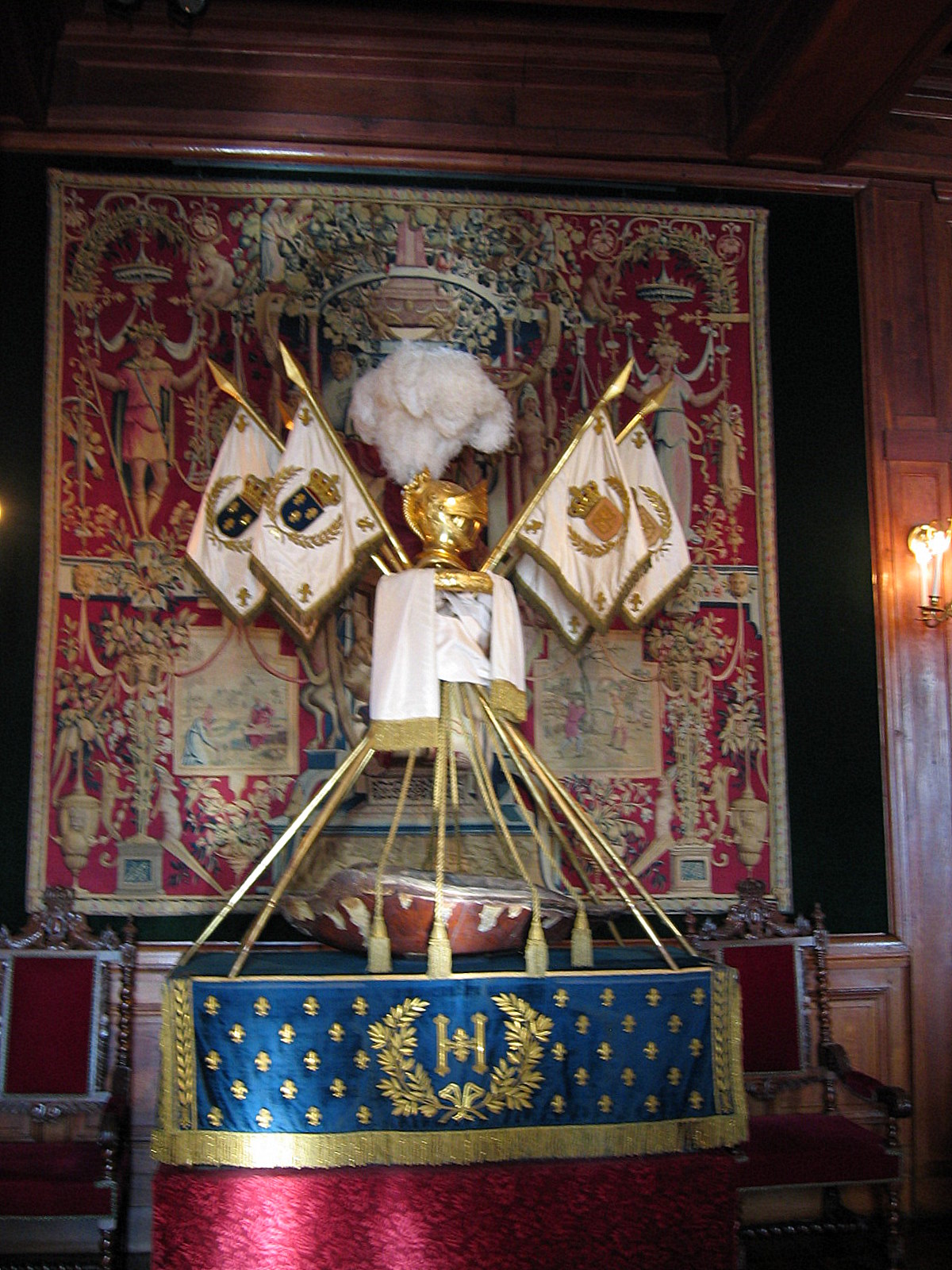
Birthplace of Henri IV

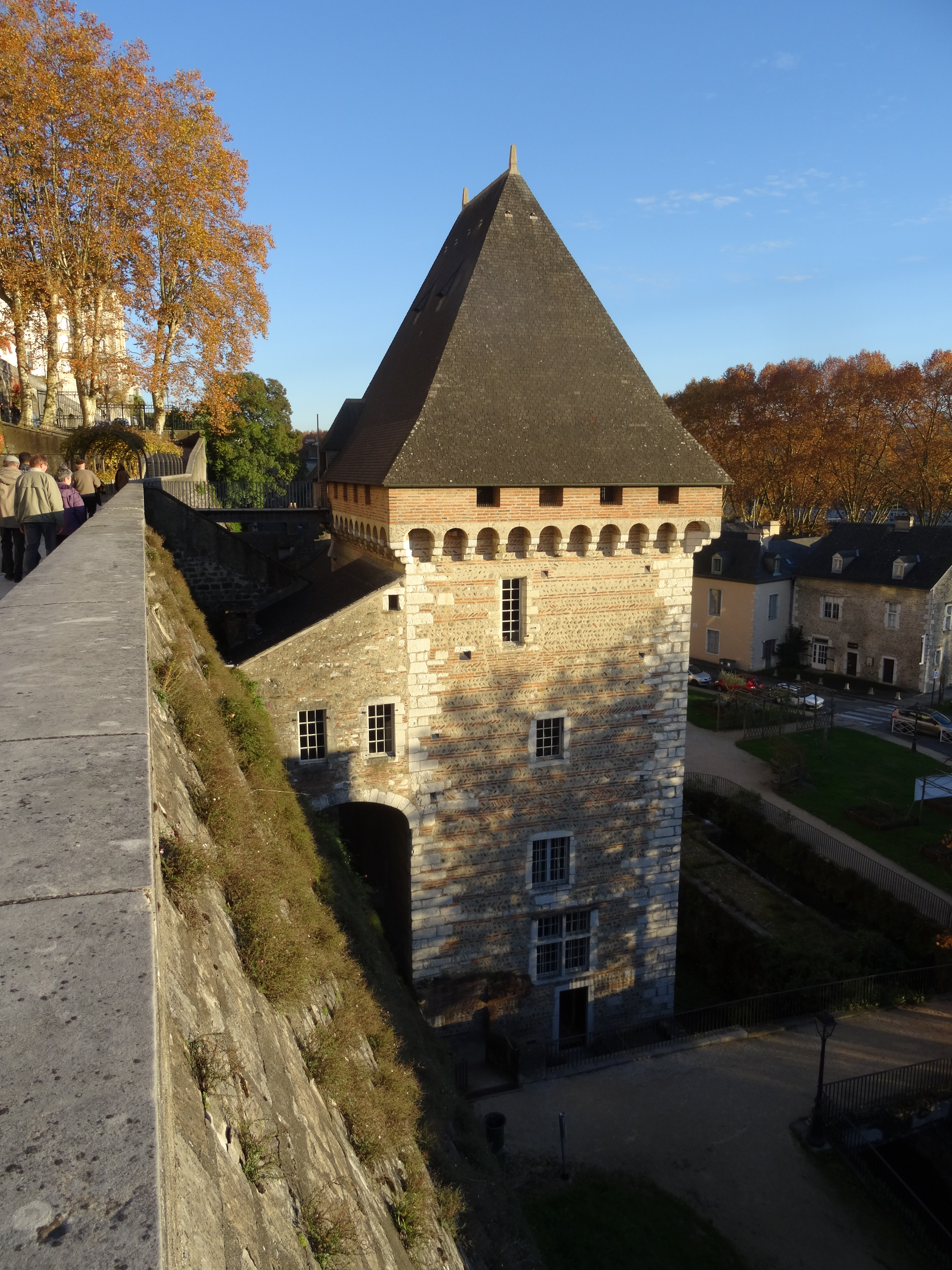
Tour de la Monnaie [Money Tower]

Close to the castle, the Parlement de Navarre [Parliament of Navarre], so named, saw its origins in the annexation of Béarn to the Crown of France under Louis XIII in 1620. Though, in fact, he established himself in a very old courthouse that had been built as early as 1585 in place of the house of the Bishop of Lescar. Burned down in 1716, it was rebuilt but quickly abandoned in favour of the current courthouse. The General Council settled there and it still holds its sessions.

Lycée Louis Barthou, originally a Jesuit college, was built in Louis XIII's appeal, probably between 1622 and 1645, for the restoration of Catholicism. It has illustrious alumni such as Lautréamont, Louis Barthou, Saint-John Perse, Pierre Bourdieu, Daniel Balavoine and Henri Emmanuelli.

The Birthplace of Bernadotte Museum is today of particular interest to Swedish tourists, it dates from the 18th century. Bernadotte was a French non-commissioned officer who was born in Pau and became a general of Napoleon and then King of Sweden under the name Charles XIV John.

==== In the 19th century ====
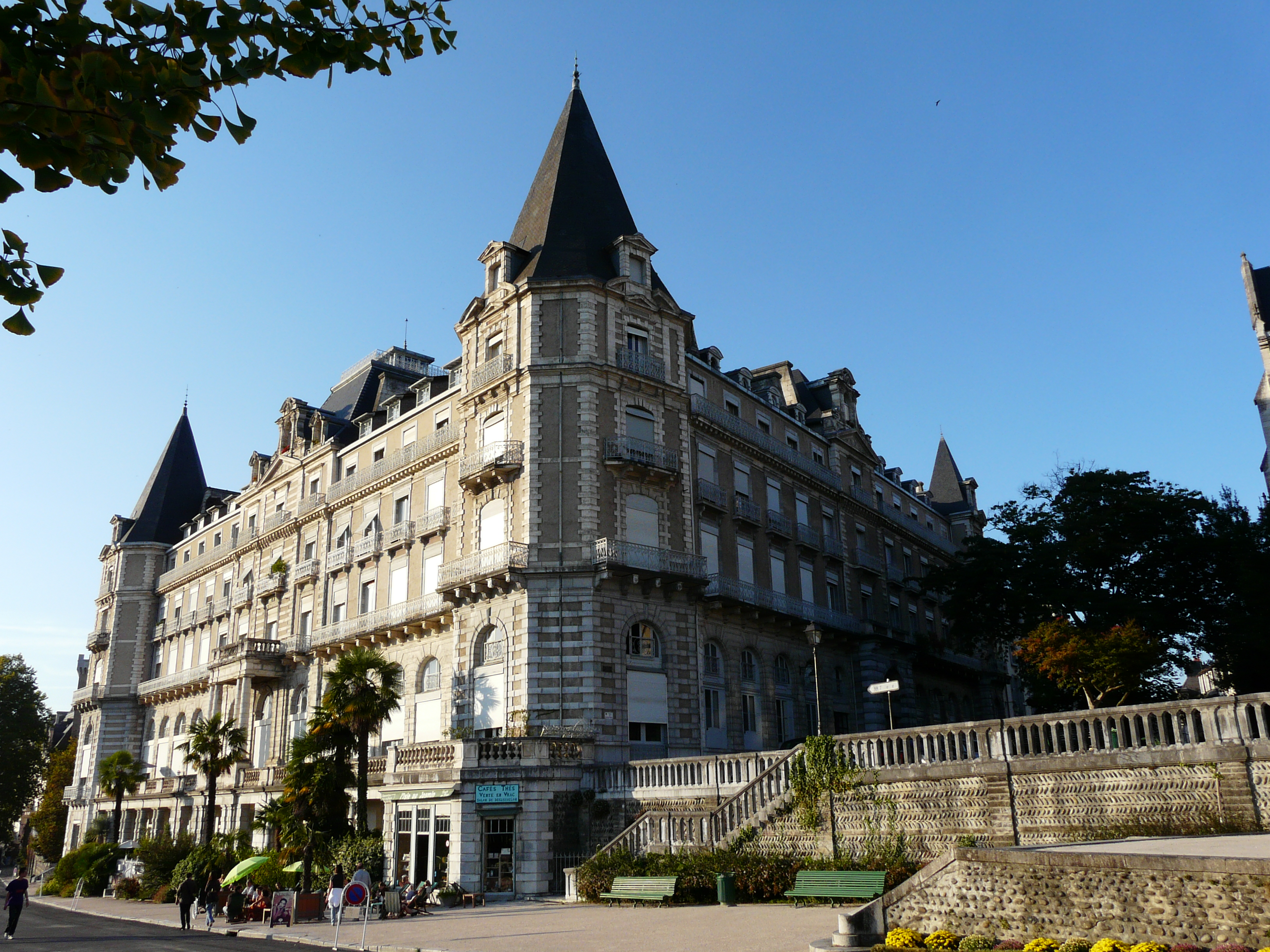
The former Hotel de Gassion

Former grand hotels of the Belle Époque which were in direct competition, the Hotel de Gassion and the Hotel de France, are located on the Boulevard des Pyrénées. The Hotel de Gassion, located between the château and the Church of Saint-Martin, now houses apartments. The Hotel de France, located to the east of the Place Royale, now houses the services of the Communauté d'agglomération de Pau-Pyrénées and is the second decision-making centre in Pau.

The Palais Beaumont, originally referred to as the Palais d'Hiver [Winter Palace], was created at the end of the 19th century. Mixing architectural styles, it was repeatedly altered and was renovated from 1996, after half a century of neglect. It hosts a casino but is primarily a convention centre, a space for events such as seminars and fairs.

The funicular, which joins with the upper town, the historic centre, has carried travellers to and from the railway station, since 1908.

Municipal services settled in the current premises of the Hôtel de Ville in 1876. The building, located north of the Place Royale, is actually a former theatre dating from 1862. The project to erect the Church of Saint-Louis, on the site, launched in 1685 and revived in 1788, was never successful.

The climate tourism which took over in Pau has left a set of prestigious villas as a legacy. Rich English, American and Russian tourists built villas to facilitate their stay during the winter. These buildings, English-style, were mainly built at the end of the 19th century. These villas now have various uses such as a charming hotel (Villa Navarre, an Anglo-Norman Manor built between 1865 and 1870), a reception room (Villa Saint Basil's built in 1889), apartments (Palais Sorrento in 1888) and as a residence of the prefect (Villa Saint Helena) etc.

The current courthouse was built on the territory of the former convent of the Cordeliers. The Place de la Libération today participates in the majesty of a building whose façade is classically decorated with columns, themselves topped by a pediment in white marble. Its construction began in 1847.

The railway station, of Eiffel style, was inaugurated in 1871 below the city centre.

It was natural that a barracks was progressively built in Pau from 1825 to 1875, the prefectural town close to the border. The Bernadotte Barracks, which today contains the national archives of the army, thus welcomed two regiments as early as 1830. The current Place de Verdun which has become parking and was formerly known as Place Napoleon, was, in fact, an area of close exercises.

==== Of the 20th century to the present day ====
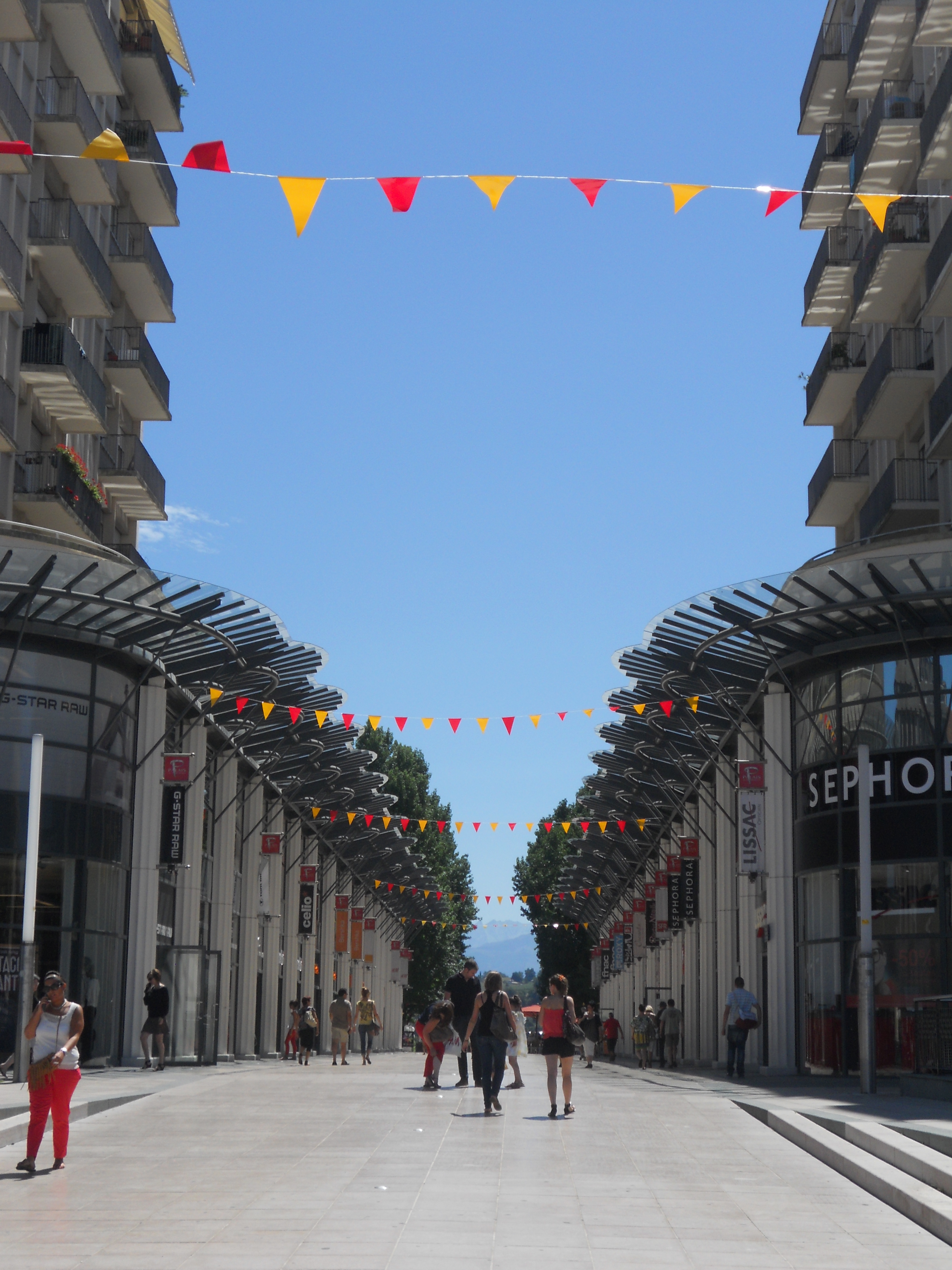
Palais des Pyrénées

- Inaugurated in 2000 at the foot of the original Parliament of Navarre, the Hôtel du Département [Departmental Administrative Building], a building of glass on which some buildings of the Boulevard des Pyrénées are reflected, now includes all administrative services linked to it.
- Renovated in 2007, the Bosquet Centre, is a shopping centre of contemporary architecture in the centre of town. Borrowing its name from Marshal Bosquet who has a nearby statue, it was built on the site of the former Hospital of Pau.
- The Palais des Pyrénées [Palace of the Pyrenees], the second shopping centre in the heart of the city, has had a tumultuous history. In its current form, it seems to have regained its spirit of 1808, that of the "Passage of Napoleon", a commercial route which heralded the modern covered market of 1838, destroyed at the beginning of the 20th century. The Palais des Pyrenees from 1930, or the Palais du Commerce et des Fêtes [Palace of trade and celebrations], was an art-deco complex covered with shops but also theatres, a casino and even a mini golf course. Return to its original condition began in 1951 with the removal of the roofing over the central path, Pau people regained views of the Pyrenees. Four buildings were then raised. It was in 2006 which it appeared in its current form, proud of its canopies of glass and steel.
- Since 1971, the Archives Départementales [Departmental Archives] have settled into two buildings, one of them of particularly atypical appearance due to its tiny triangular windows, which are designed to give the best protection to the preserved documents.
- The Archives Communautaires de l'Agglomération de Pau-Pyrénées [Community Archives of the Agglomeration of Pau-Pyrénées] are grouped, since March 2011, in the buildings of the former tram factory (on the site of what was previously a gas plant, as evidenced by the high chimney).
- The Faculté de Lettres et Sciences Humaines [Faculty of Letters and Human Sciences], and the Maison de l'Agriculture [House of Agriculture], with similar architectures dating from the start of the 1970s, break in their likeness as the first seems to humbly blend in with the vegetation, while the second seems to display a relative majesty.

=== Outstanding built-up areas ===
==== Town squares ====
- Place Clémenceau and the Palais des Pyrénées, the market square and centre commercial-street. In the heart of the downtown area, this is the site of many public festivals, shopping, and a fountain.
- Place d'Espagne [Spain Square]: Containing buildings of contemporary architecture as well as the Bosquet commercial centre
- Place des sept cantons [Seven Cantons Square]: This square is joined to not seven but six streets
- Place des États [States Square]: The crossroads of transhumance until the Renaissance era, in the area of the Château de Pau
- Place Gramont: An architectural ensemble from the 18th century, with many summer terraces
- Place Reine-Marguerite [Queen Marguerite Square]: bordered by arcades with pebbled arches, it once was the marketplace, and a gallows and wheel for executions once stood here
- Place Royale: Created by Louis XIV, it was built in its present form with a statue of Henry IV during the reign of Louis Philippe. It includes the Pau Town Hall
- Place de Verdun: A large square today occupied by ample free parking and bordered to the west by the Bernadotte military barracks
- Place de la Libération: The Palace of Justice and the Santiago Church are in this square
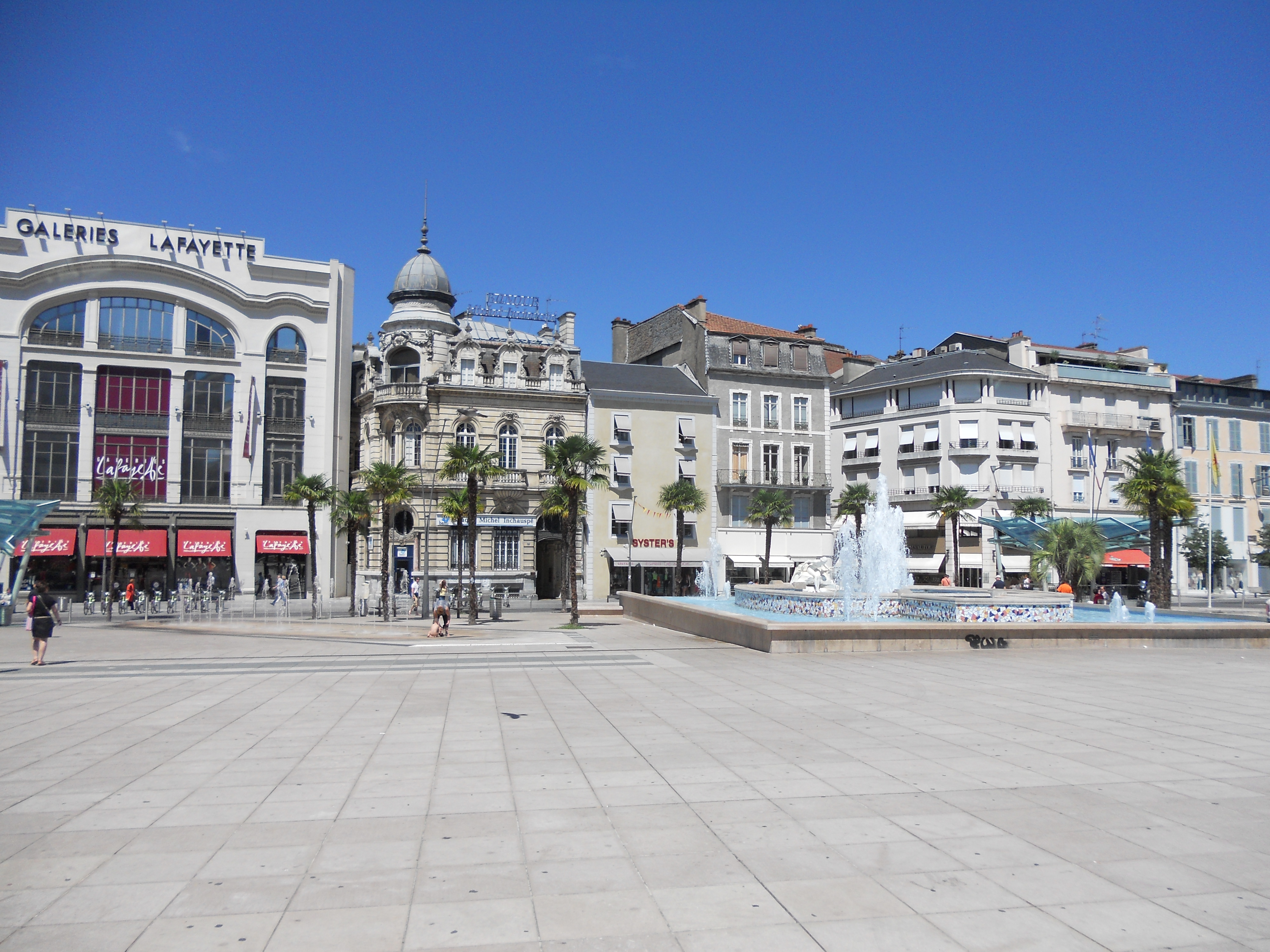
Place Clemenceau

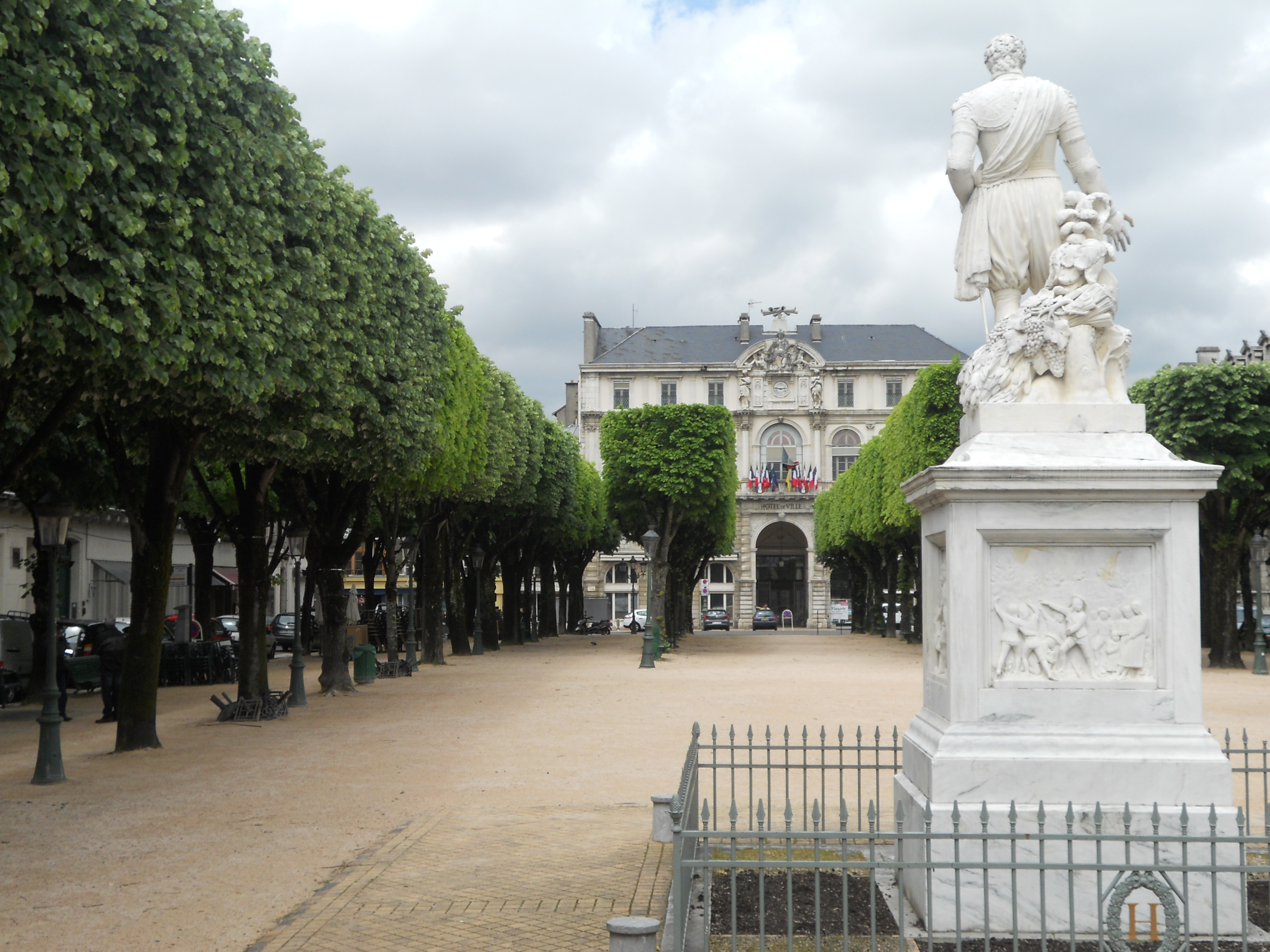
Place Royale

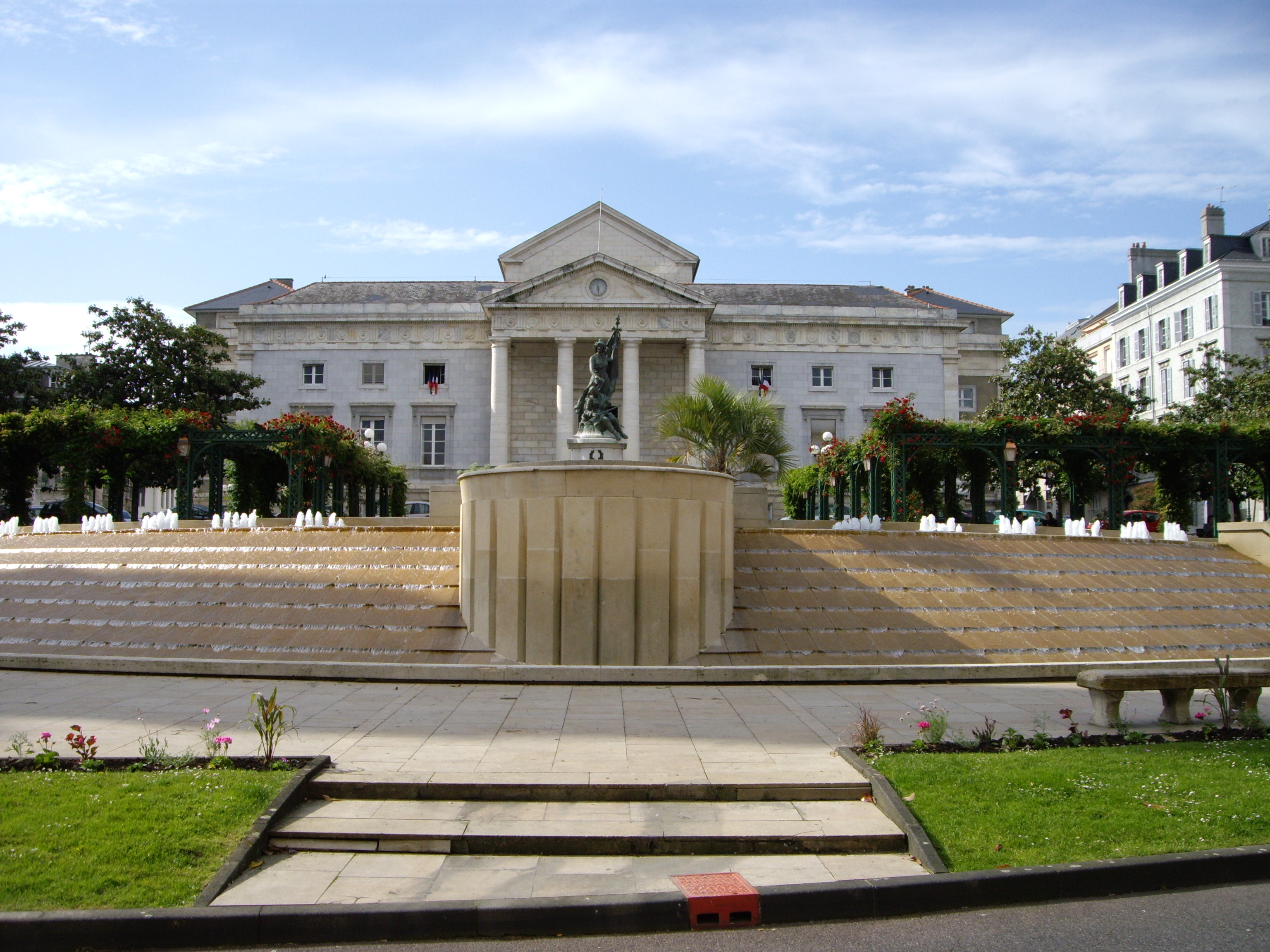
Place de la Libération

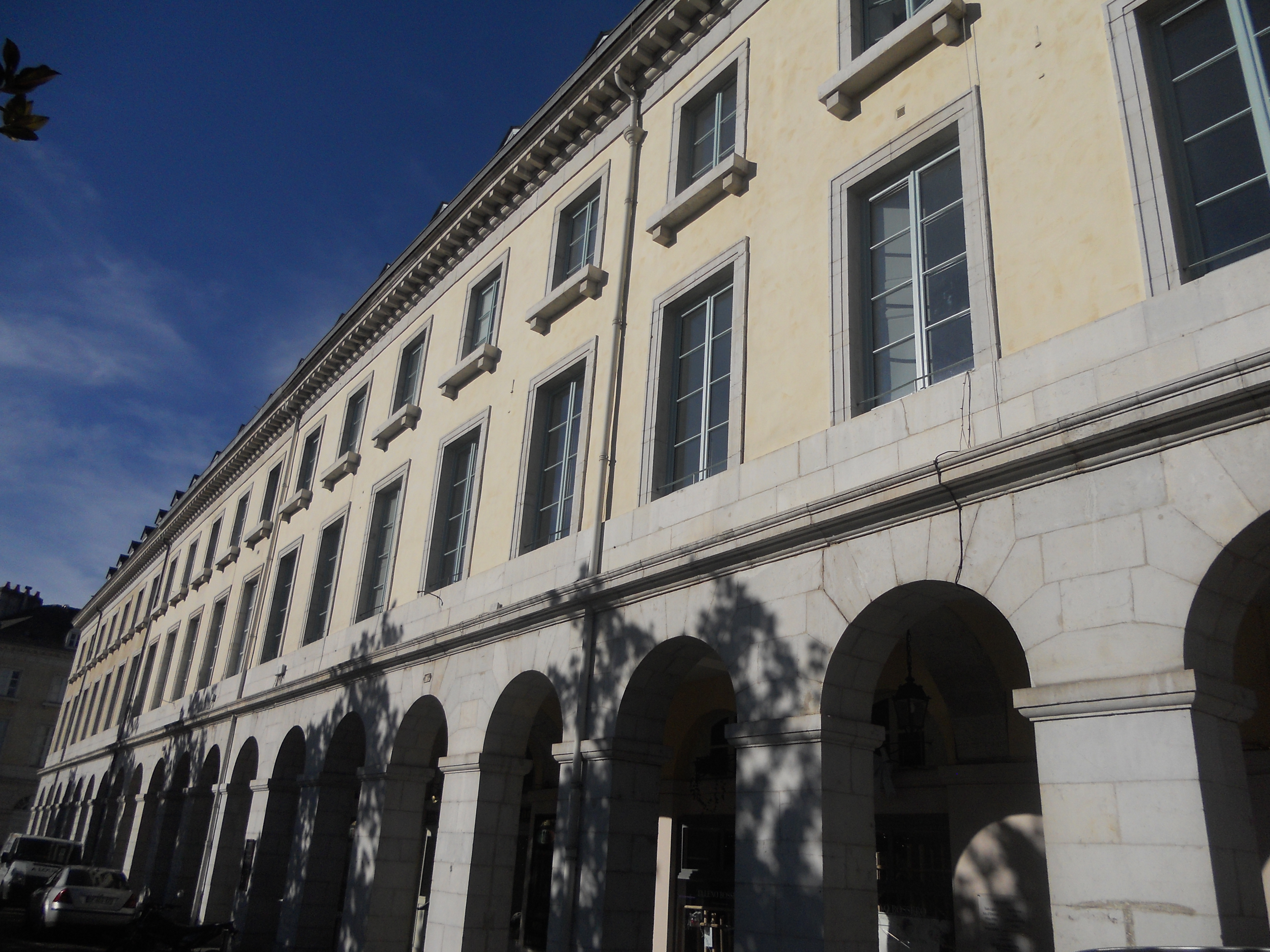
Arcades of the Place Gramont

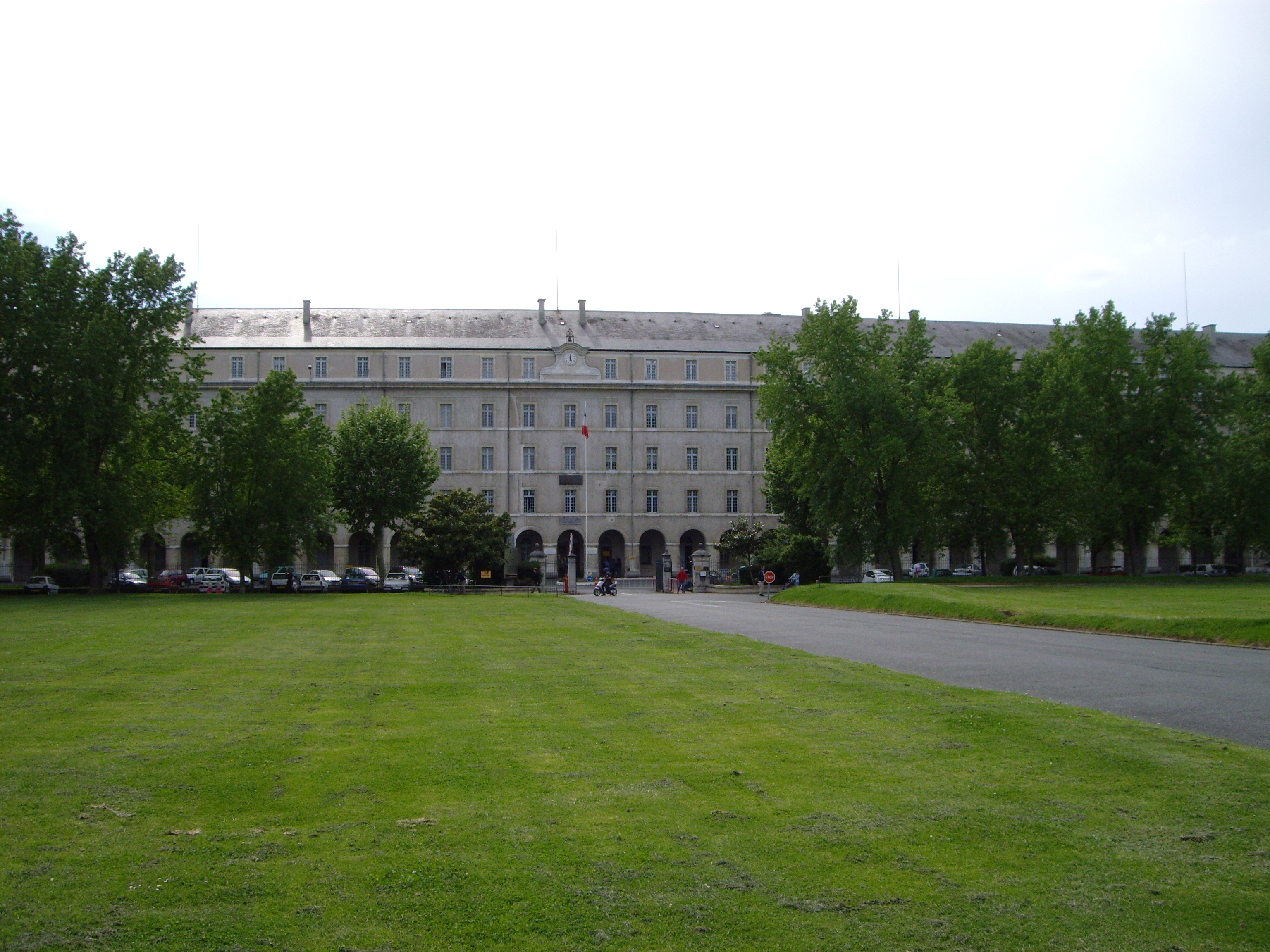
Place de Verdun

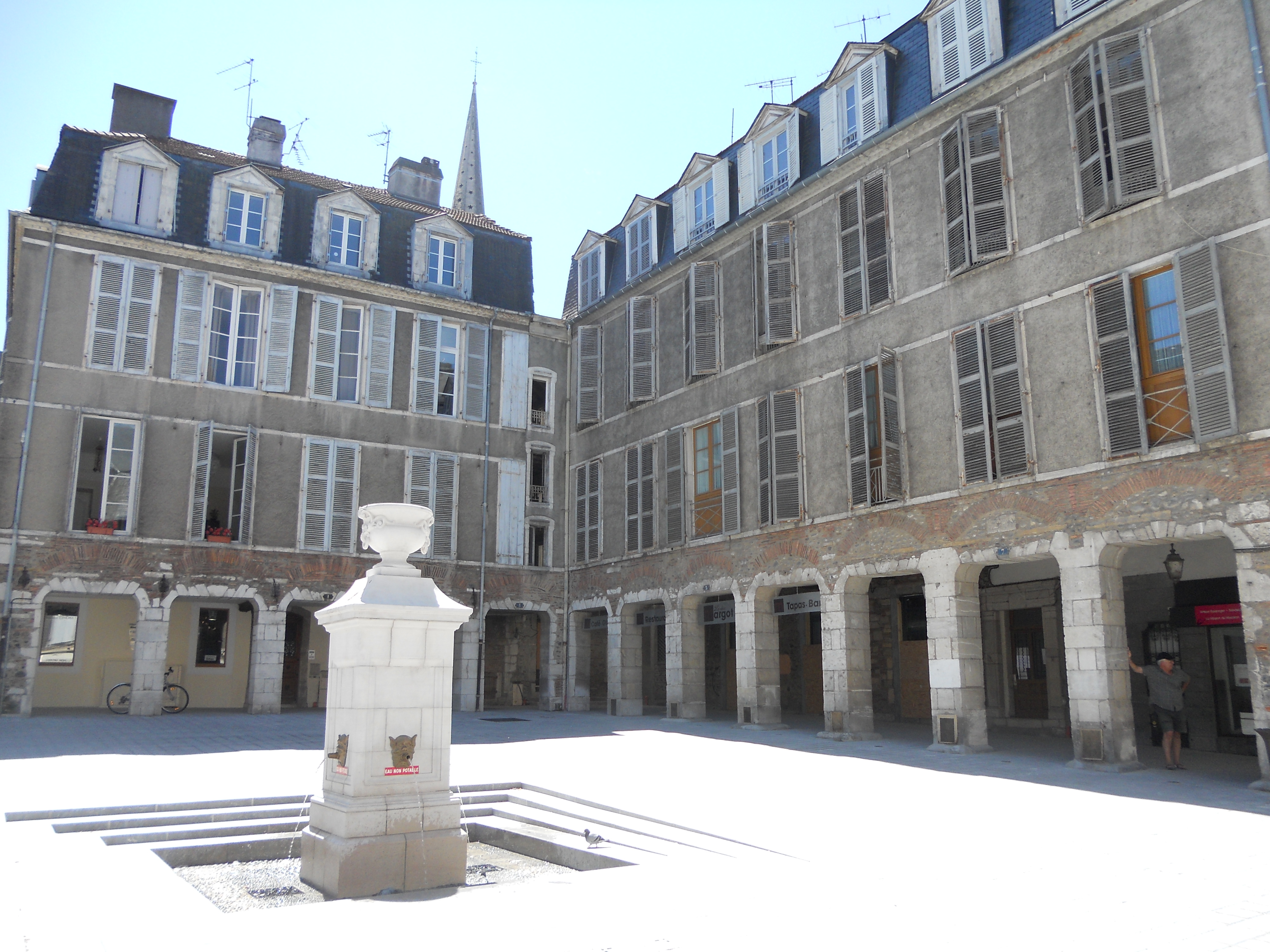
Place Reine-Marguerite

==== Streets ====
- The Boulevard des Pyrénées, created on the initiative of Napoleon I as a continuation of the Place Royale, is 1,800 metres (5,900 ft) long. The panoramic view from the boulevard extends beyond the hills of Gelos and Jurançon to include the Pic d'Anie at 2,504 metres (8,215 ft), the Pic du Midi de Bigorre at 2,865 metres (9,400 ft) which is topped with an astronomical observatory known worldwide for the quality of its solar and planetary photographs (NASA used it to prepare for the Apollo missions), the Midi d'Ossau at 2,884 metres (9,462 ft) is of volcanic nature and of distinctive and symbolic shape, as well as Balaïtous at 3,146 metres (10,322 ft) and the Vignemale at 3,298 metres (10,820 ft), the highest peak in the French Pyrenees. One of the peculiarities of this avenue overlooking the Pyrenees is the presence of plates of orientation, allowing an alignment with a lightning rod on a factory chimney below, for recognizing the great peaks of the mountain range.
- The Rue du Maréchal-Joffre connects the Château Quarter to Place Clemenceau, it was first named Grande Rue and helped Pau to expand eastward at the end of the Middle Ages. The street assured freedom of movement for traffic as much as it helped to distribute the housing. The large houses of the parliamentarians and notables, from the different eras, can show their façades or give a more discreet entry to the rear of the houses. The revenue houses, smaller but just as numerous, punctuate the blocks with the succession of their bays. The merchant past is recalled by the presence of the arches of the Place de la Vieille-Halle (Place Reine-Marguerite). The Rue du Maréchal-Joffre is now fully paved and pedestrianised, after work undertaken between 2011 and 2012.
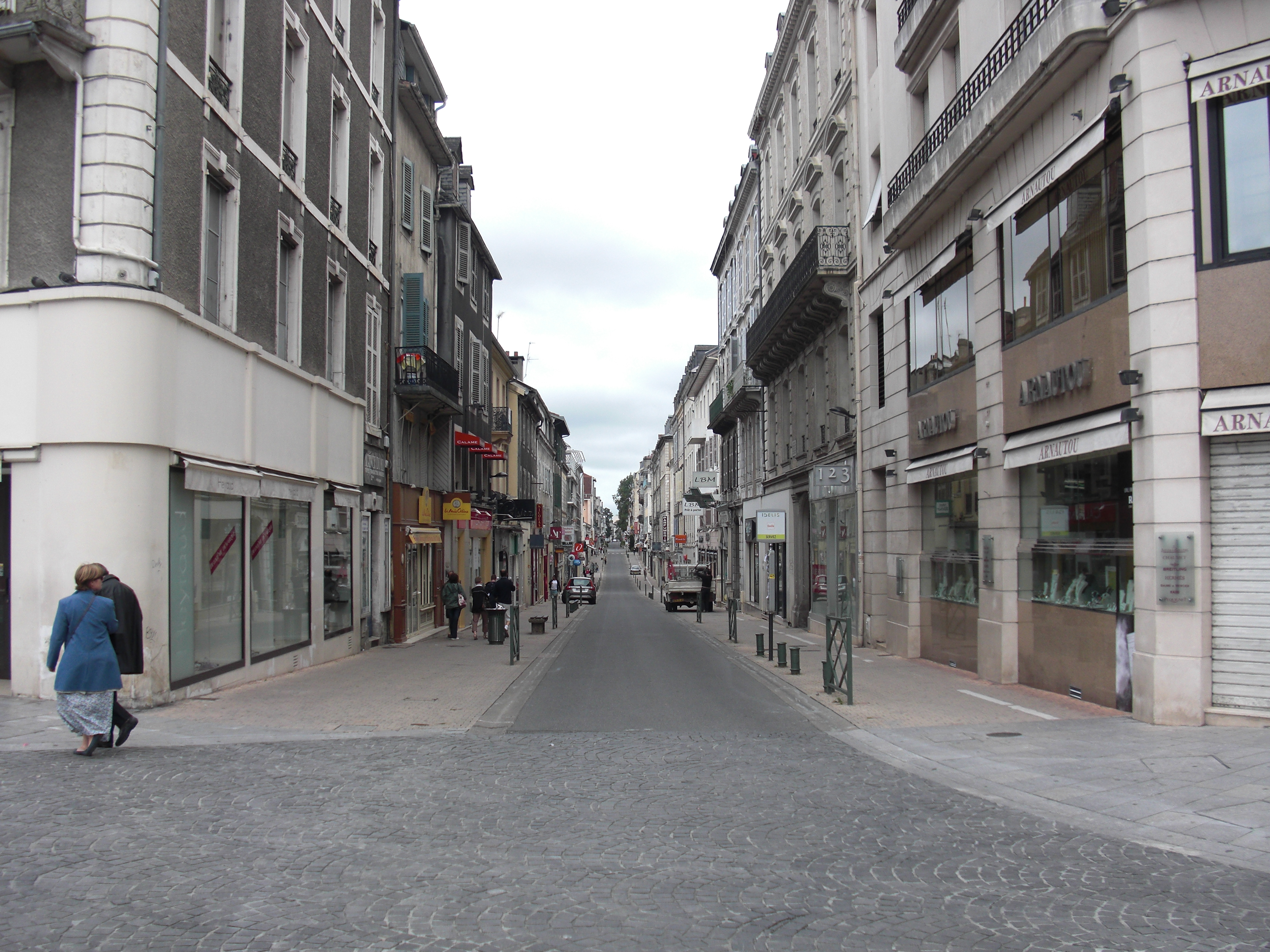
Rue Serviez

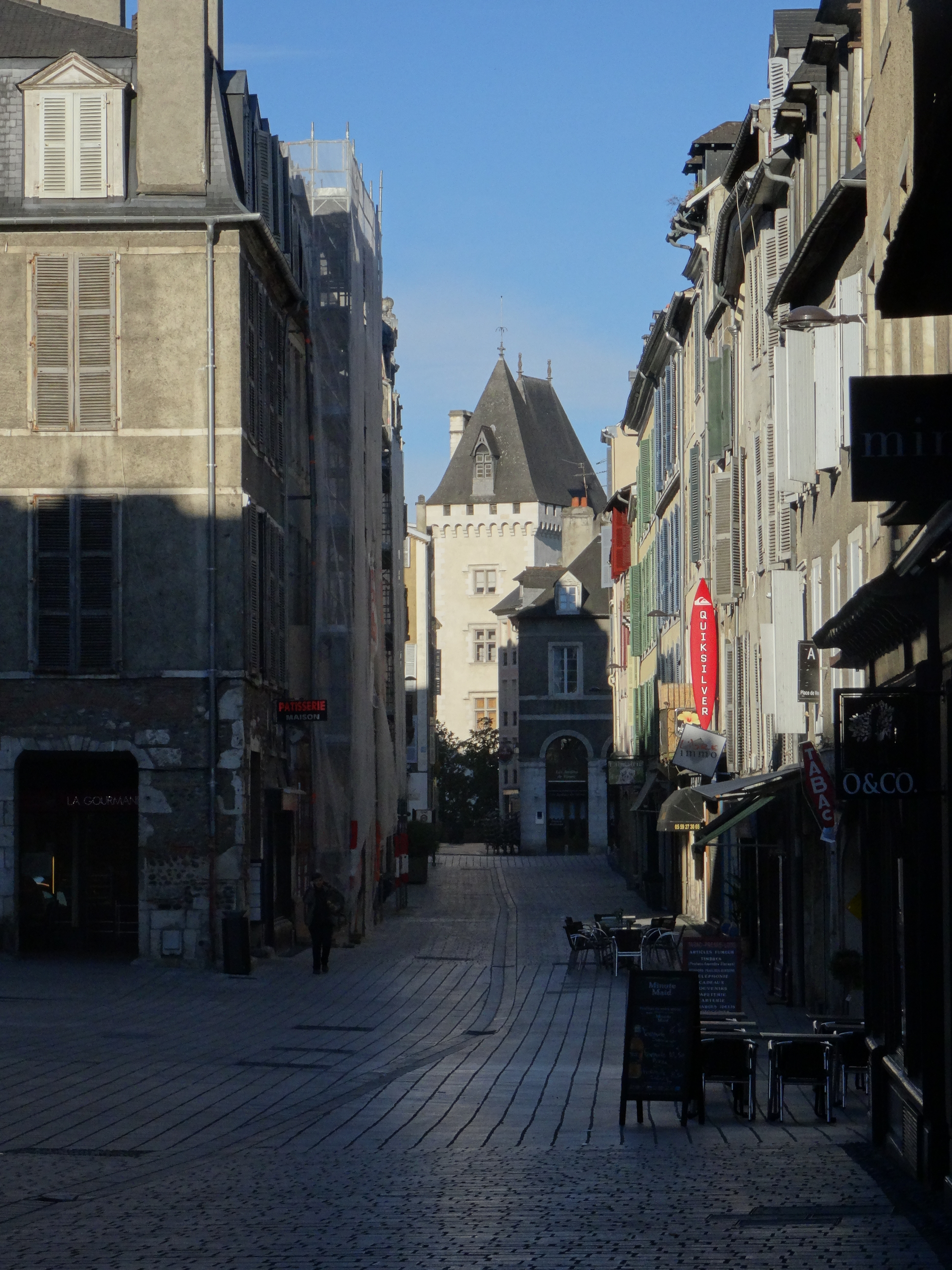
Rue du Maréchal-Joffre

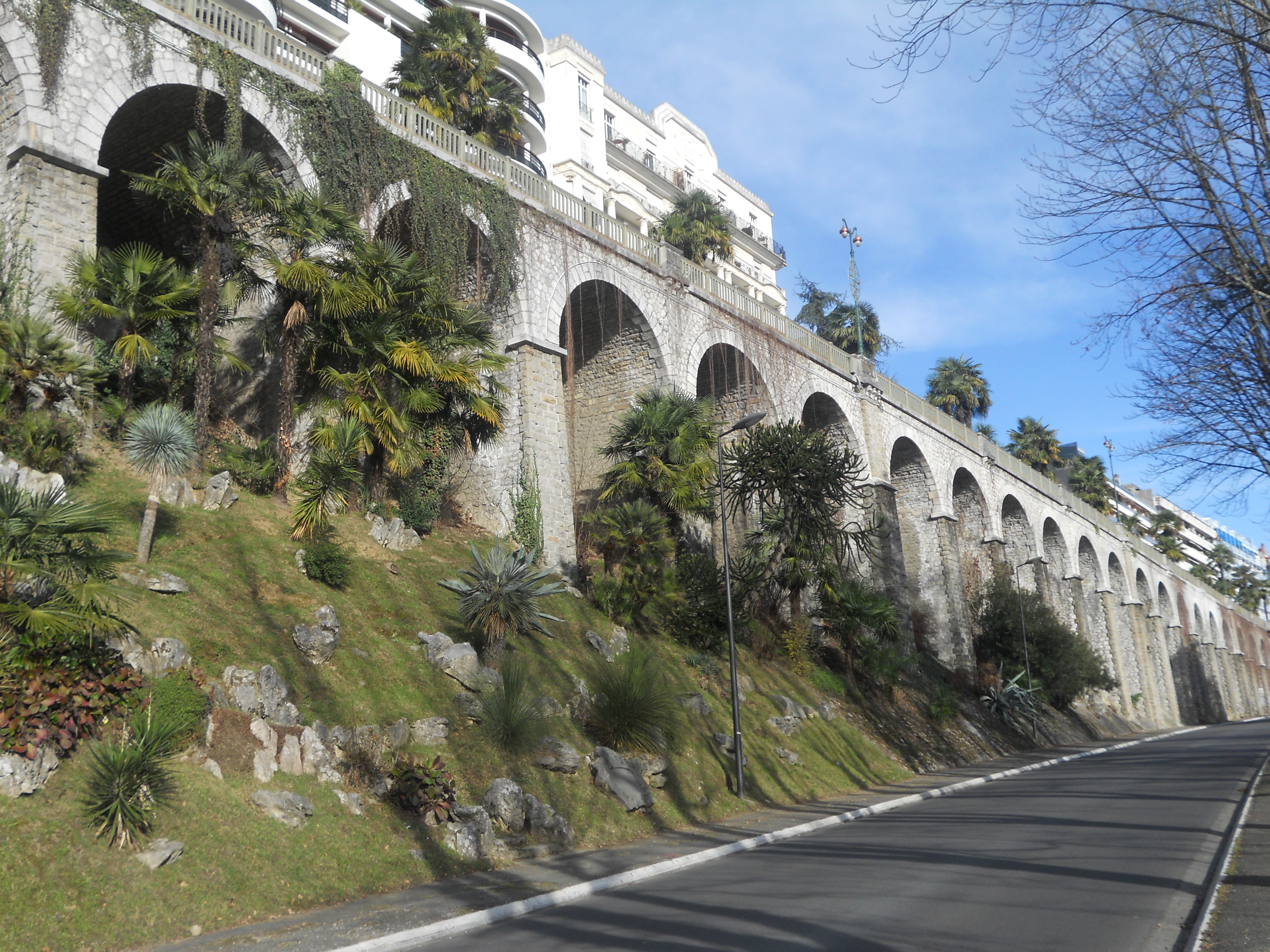
The arches of the Boulevard des Pyrénées

==== Typical districts ====
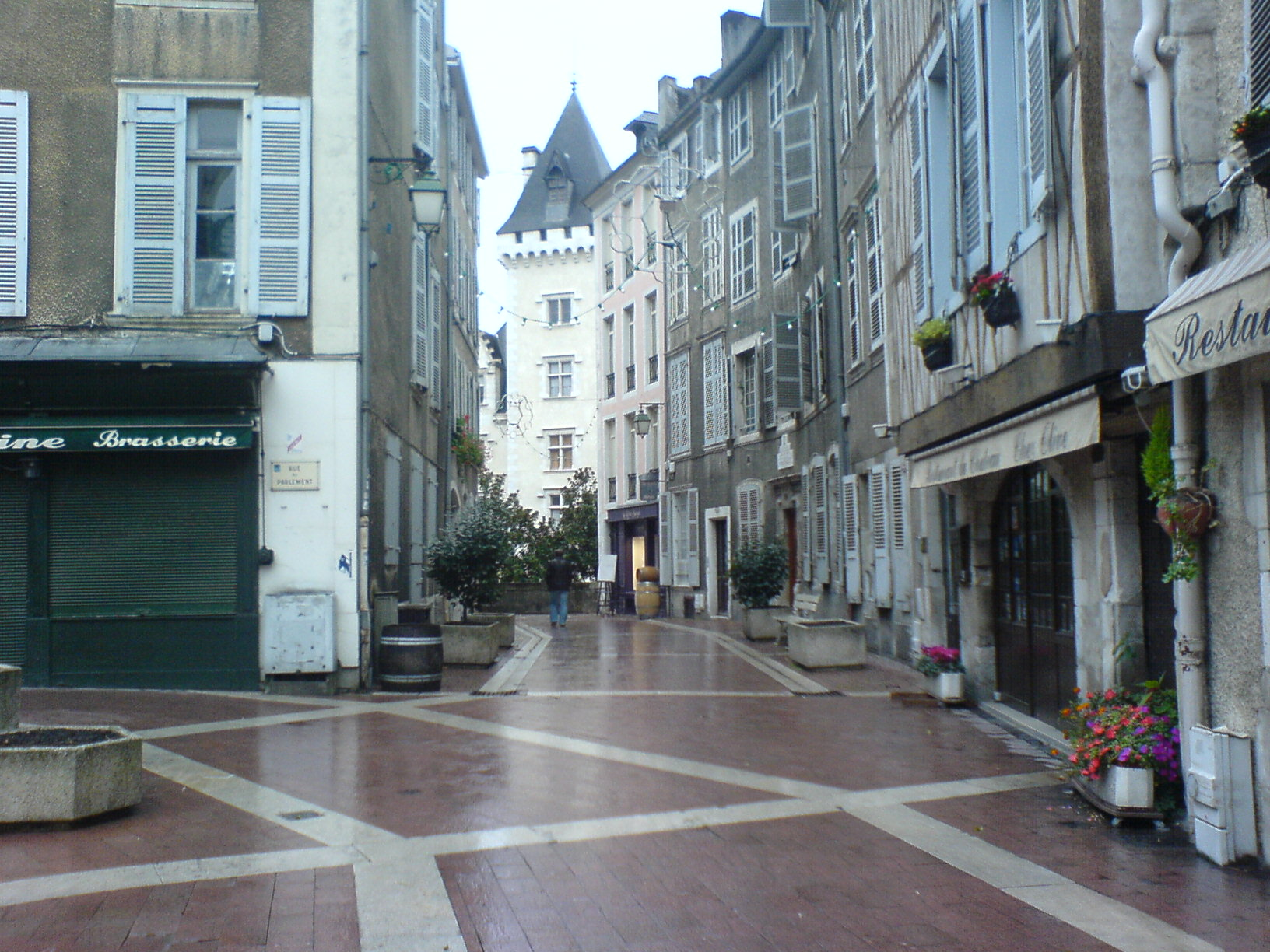
The Château Quarter in the rain

- The Château Quarter: The historic quarter of Pau in the narrow old lanes, which gives the quarter a medieval appearance.
- The Hedås Quarter: An old quarter which was built in a ravine which previously crossed a stream, in the heart of the historic city.
- The Trespoey Quarter: A very wooded area with many 19th century English-style villas. It is the area of the city of the more bourgeois, historically upmarket. The most prestigious hotels in the city are now here, such as the Villa Navarre and the Beaumont.

=== Environmental heritage ===
==== Parks and gardens ====
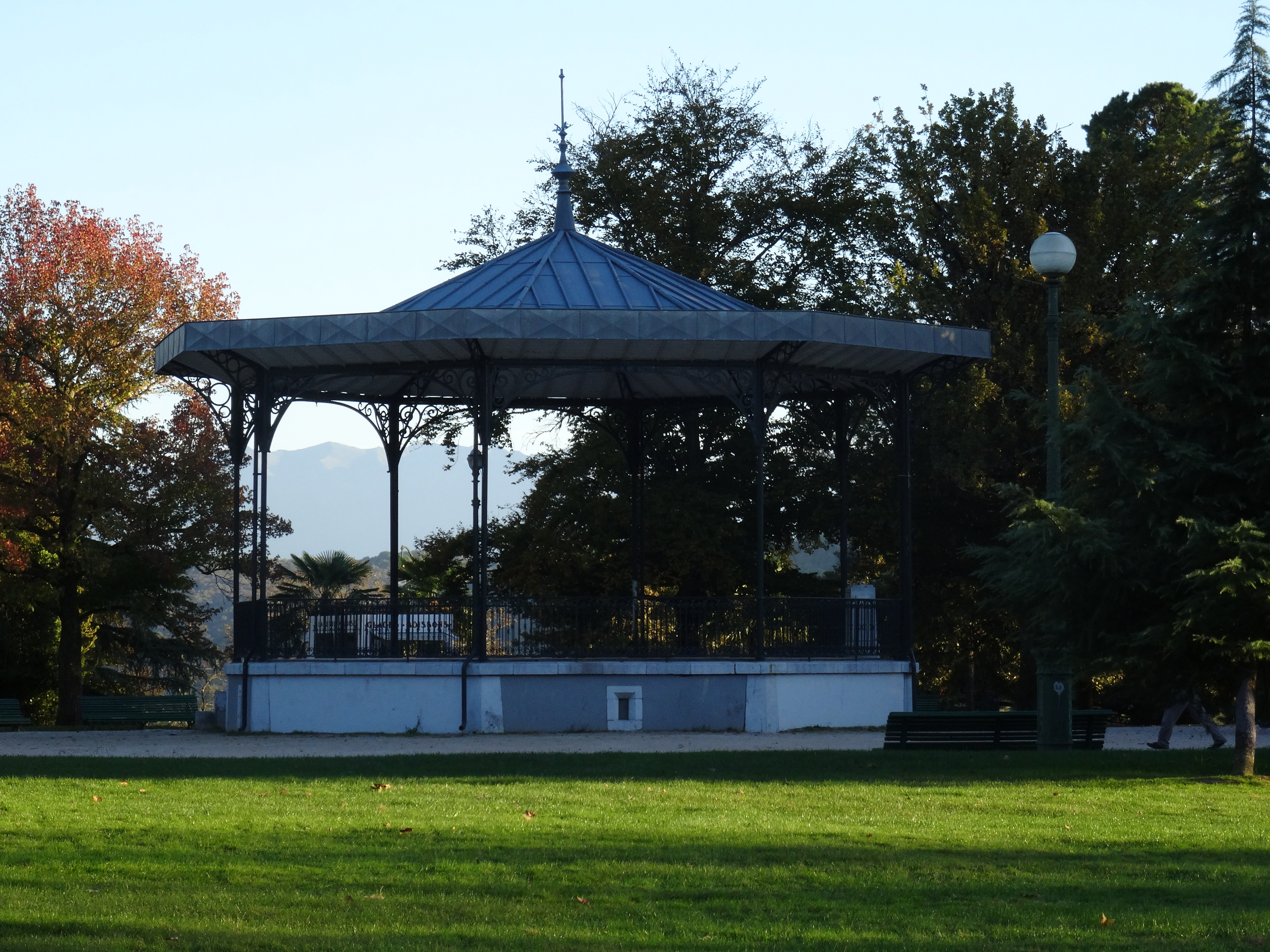
Parc Beaumont

Pau is also a green city, having more than 750 hectares (1,900 acres) occupied by green areas, with many rare and exotic species. Pau has been classed "4 flowers" by the Competition of Flowery Cities and Villages. In some districts, for example Trespoey, the villas are bathed in vegetation. Pau is thus one of the European cities that have the most square meters of greenery per capita (80 square metres (860 sq ft) per capita):

- Parc Beaumont with a lake, river and waterfall, many flower beds, a large rockery and a rose garden. The 12 hectares (30 acres) rugby ball-shaped park contains 110 species of trees. Some subjects are "notable" by their size, their age or their rarity such as Bald Cypress from Louisiana, Virginia persimmon and giant sequoia.
- Parc Lawrence, a park with old trees, which is home to one of the many 19th century English villas of Pau.
- The National Domain of the Château de Pau, composed of a Renaissance garden with medicinal plants and a park. The large park has walking trails and plenty of open space, for outdoor activities in the middle of the city.
- The Sentiers du Roy, connecting the upper town to the lower town
- Johanto Gardens, at the bottom of the Boulevard des Pyrénées, with its many and strong Palm trees
- Contemporary gardens of the Hôtel du Département, in the lower town
- The banks of the Gave de Pau, at Billère and Jurançon, downstream from the Pont d'Espagne [bridge of Spain] and the Whitewater Arena.
- Besson Square, near the Conservatoire of music and dance with including Sequoia sempervirens
- The Kōfu Garden, a Japanese garden opened in 2005 with plans provided by the gardeners of the city of Kōfu
- Parc en ciel [Park in the sky], opened in 2013 in the Hameau Quarter

==== Horizons Palois (Pau Horizons) ====
The notion of Horizons Palois refers to the desire to protect the major elements which structure the special view from Pau to its natural environment. The view from the heights of Pau includes the saligues of the Gave de Pau and the hillsides of Jurançon and finally the chain of the Pyrenees. Seventeen sites were registered in 1944 as Horizons Palois, in order to protect them from any construction or alteration that may deteriorate the extraordinary panorama which is particularly visible from the Boulevard des Pyrénées and the château. The city of Pau has committed several years of reflection to a candidacy of the Horizons to UNESCO World Heritage. This would thus enhance the protection of the panorama, and also be an improvement with the renaming of this site to the general public.

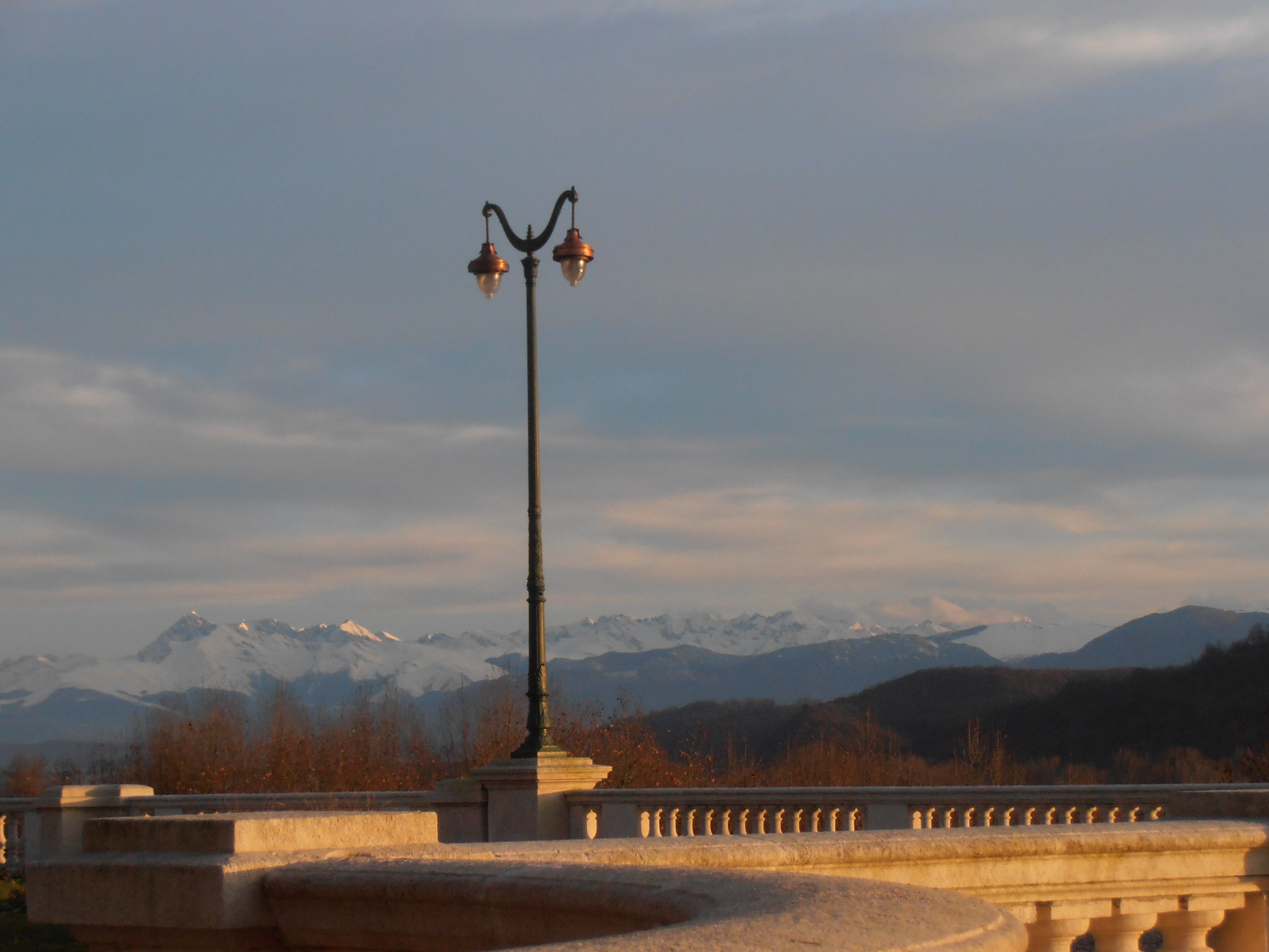
The rooftop terrace of the Pavillon des Arts

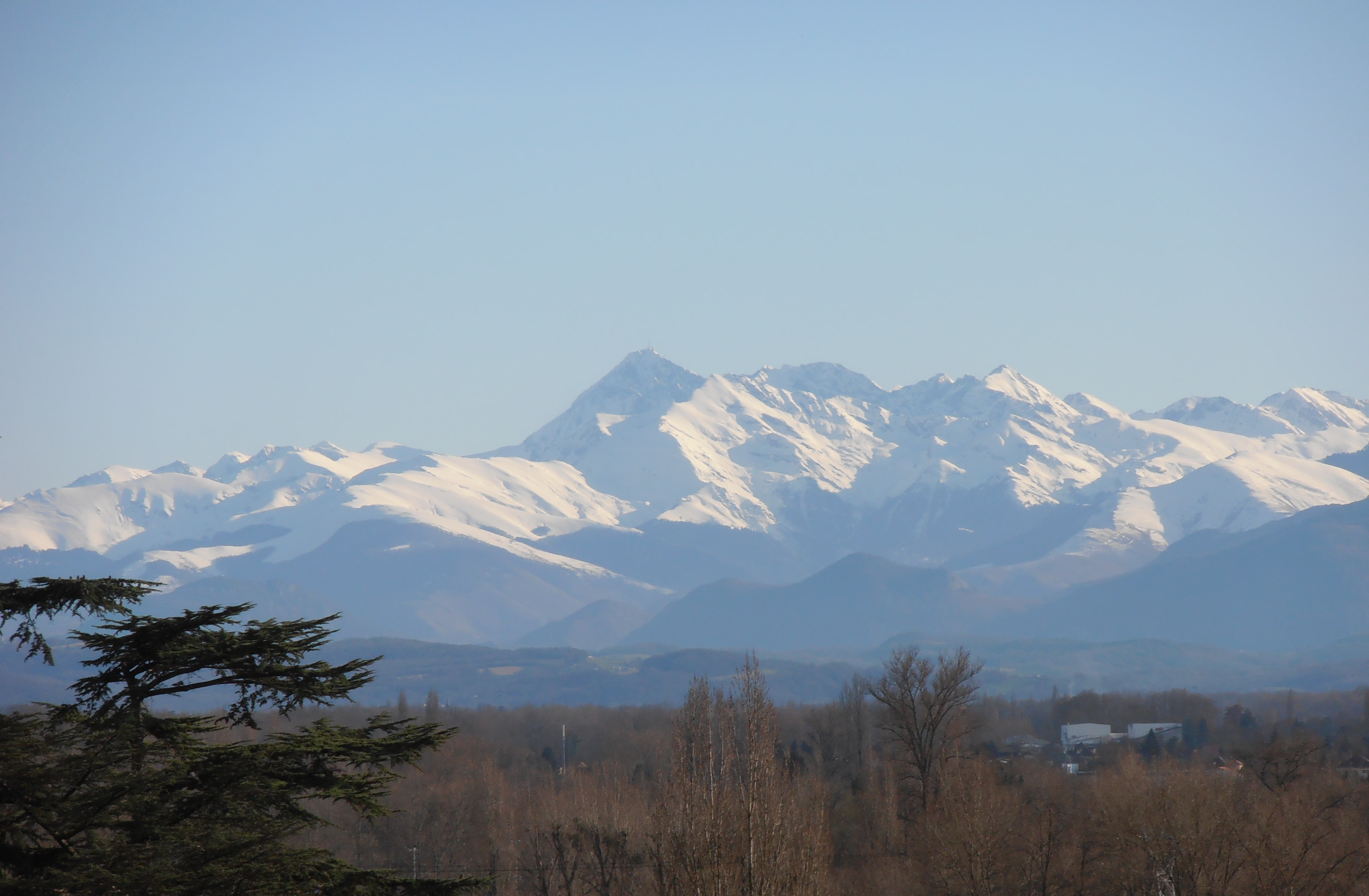
The Pic du Midi de Bigorre

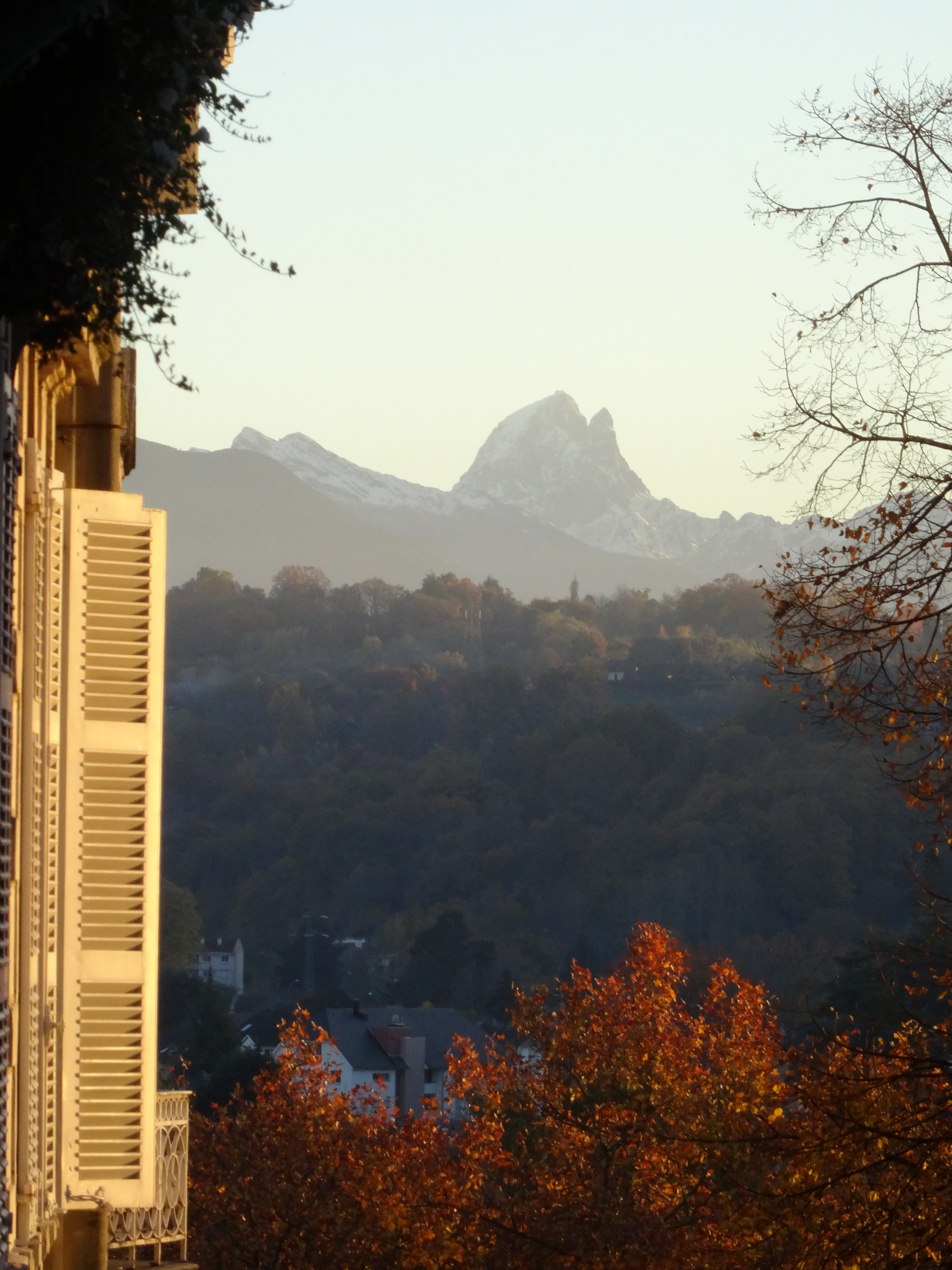
A view of the Ossau

== Labels ==
- City of Art and History from 2011
- In his 2014 ranking the Conseil National des Villes et Villages Fleuris de France has assigned four flowers to the commune in the contest of flowery cities and villages (since 1983)
- UNICEF child friendly city
- TOP COM gold for its website in 2006, an award which annually recognizes the best communication actions

== Notable people ==
=== People born in Pau ===
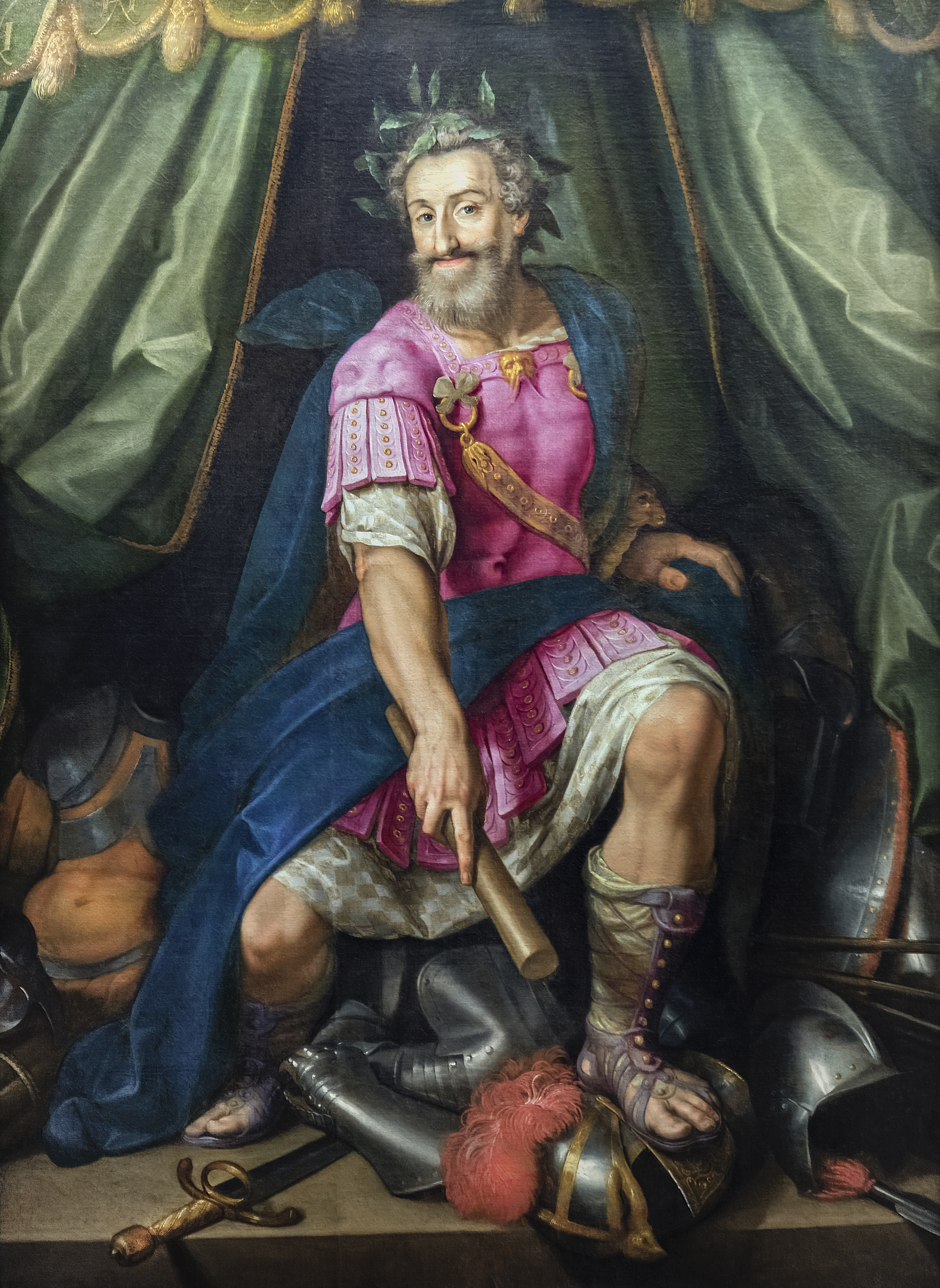
Henry IV, King of France

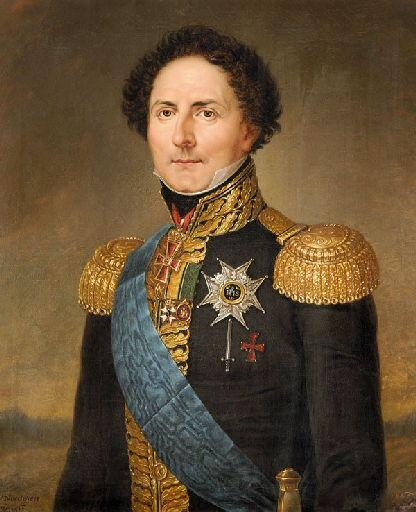
Charles XIV John, né Jean-Baptiste Jules Bernadotte, King of Sweden and Norway

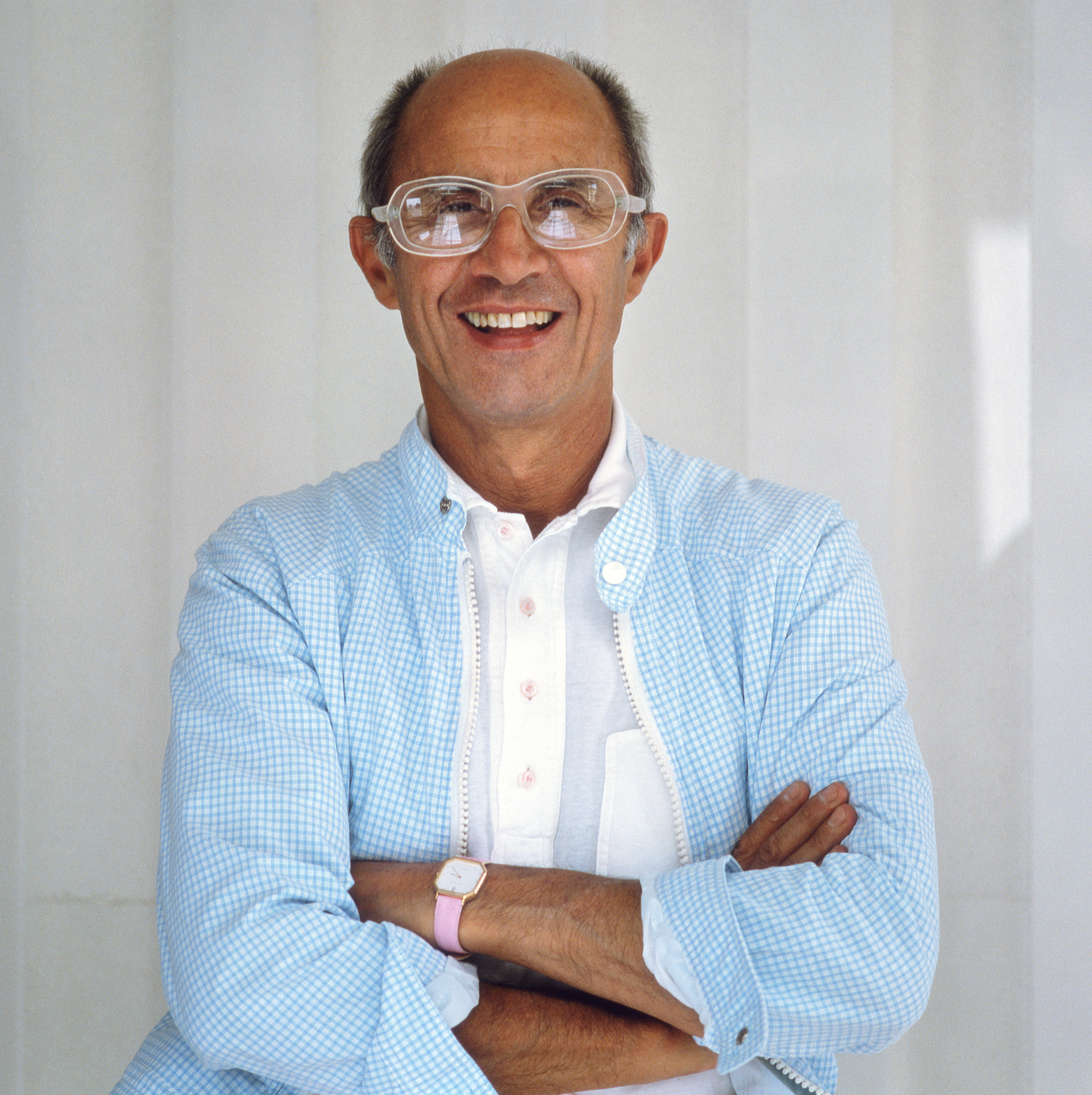
André Courrèges, 1985

- François Phébus (1467–1483), Count of Foix and Viscount of Béarn from 1479 to 1483
- Gastón de Peralta, 3rd Marquis of Falces (1510–1587), viceroy of New Spain from 1566 to 1568
- Jeanne d'Albret (1528–1572), Queen of Navarre from 1555 to 1572
- Henry IV (1553–1610), King of France from 1589 to 1610 and Navarre from 1572 to 1610.
- Porthos (1617), musketeer
- Jean de Gassion (1609–1647), Marshal of France under Louis XIII and Louis XIV
- Pierre Clément de Laussat (1756–1835), politician
- Jean-Baptiste Jules Bernadotte (1763–1844), Marshal of France and later King of Sweden and Norway as Charles XIV John of Sweden.
- Guillaume Latrille de Lorencez (1772–1855), general of the armies of the Republic and the Empire
- Charles-Denis Bourbaki (1816–1897), general of Greek descent.
- Maurice de Mirecki (1845–1900) musician
- Philippe Dauzon (1860–1918), politician, grandson of the hellenist Philippe Le Bas and great-grandson of the conventional Philippe Le Bas
- Adrien Pozzi (1860–1939), politician and surgeon
- Paul-Jean Toulet (1867–1920), poet and writer
- Charles François-Saint-Maur (1869–1949), politician
- Princess Beatrice of Bourbon (1874–1961)
- Princess Alice of Bourbon (1876–1975)
- Ernest Gabard (1879–1957), sculptor, painter, watercolorist
- Pierre Henri Cami (1884–1958), writer, humorist, actor, journalist, illustrator and cartoonist
- Fernand Forgues (1884–1973), former international Rugby union footballer, French international player
- André Moulonguet (1887–1983), physician, otolaryngologist and member, Académie Nationale de Médecine
- Jean Jules Verdenal (1890–1915), friend and correspondent of T. S. Eliot
- Georges Loustaunau-Lacau (1894–1955), military, personality of the extreme right in the 1930s, resistant
- Bertrand d'Astorg (1913–1988), writer, poet, winner of the 1980 Prix de l'essai
- Louis Auriacombe (1917–1982), conductor
- Georges Laplace (1918–2004), prehistorian
- Henriette Bidouze (1921–1989) resistant, Communist and feminist activist
- Yvon Bourges (1921–2009), son of a colonel, Gaullist resistant, sub-prefect of Erstein (Bas-Rhin), Minister of defence in 1975, Mayor of Dinard, MP and Senator RPR of the arrondissement of Saint-Malo
- André Courrèges (1923–2016), couturier. In 1965, his collection contributed to the success of the miniskirt
- René-Marie Castaing (1924), artist painter (Premier Grand Prix de Rome)
- Robert Massard (1925–2025), baritone from the Paris Opera
- André Labarrère (1928–2006), associate of history (Sorbonne), doctor of letters, Mayor of Pau, Minister, MP and Senator
- Donal O'Brien (1930–2003), actor
- Francis Mer (1939), industrialist and politician
- Guy Penaud (1943), historian, senior honorary police Commissioner
- Roger-Gérard Schwartzenberg (born 1943), politician
- Alain Lamassoure (1944), politician
- Francis Lassus (1961), musician
- Yves Camdeborde (1964), chef
- Bertrand Cantat (1964), singer and actor
- Éric Gonzalès (1964), writer
- Jean-Marc Laurent (1965), man of radio and television, host (France-Bleu, NRJ, RFI), TV presenter (Loto, Odyssée, Matin-Bonheur)
- Ariane Massenet (1965), television host
- Frédéric Lopez (1967), television host
- Nathalie Cardone (1967), singer
- Philippe Rombi (1968), composer
- Éric Piolle (1973), engineer and politician, mayor of Grenoble
- Nicolas Cazalé (1977), actor and model
- Fabienne Carat (1979), actress
- Isabelle Ithurburu (1983), television presenter
- William Buzy (1989), writer and journalist

==== Sport (born in Pau) ====
- René Léonard (1889–1965), racing driver
- Victor Fontan (1892–1982), cyclist who led the 1929 Tour de France
- Marguerite Broquedis (1893–1983), professional tennis player
- Robert Haillet (1931–2011), tennis player
- Éric Cayrolle (1962), racing driver
- Philippe Bernat-Salles (1970), former international rugby union footballer, French player
- Jérôme Garcès (1973), international rugby union referee

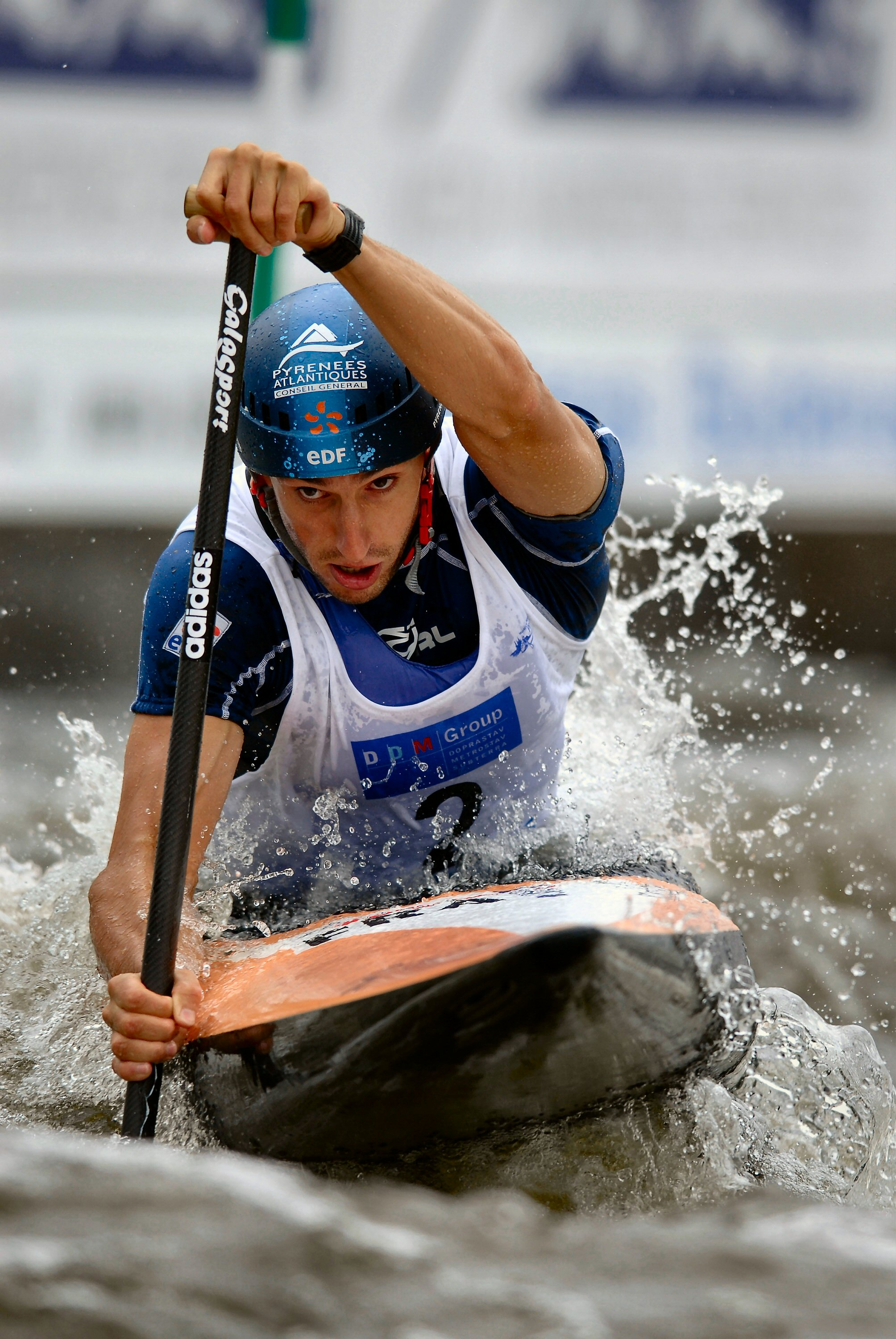
Tony Estanguet, triple Olympic slalom champion

- Patrice Estanguet (1973), sportsman, bronze medal in canoeing (slalom) at the Atlanta Olympics in 1996
- Stéphane Augé (1974), cyclist
- Walter Lapeyre (1976), shooter
- Emmanuelle Sykora (1976), former football player, who played for Olympique Lyonnais (to 2005) and France's football team (to 2004, 81 CAPs)
- Jean Bouilhou (1978), Rugby Union footballer
- Édouard Cissé (1978), professional footballer
- Tony Estanguet (1978), Olympic champion slalom canoeist in 2000, 2004 and 2012, President of the Paris 2024 Olympic Organizing Committee
- Sébastien Chabbert (1978), footballer
- Cédric Gracia (1978), mountain biker
- Laurent Cazenave (1978), racing driver
- Lucas Lasserre (1978), racing driver
- Damien Traille (1979), Rugby Union player
- Julien Cardy (1981), footballer
- Mathieu Ladagnous (1984), cyclist
- Mike Parisy (1984), racing driver
- Jean-Baptiste Peyras-Loustalet (1984), professional Rugby Union player
- Jérémy Chardy (1987), tennis player
- Alexandra Lacrabère (1987), handball player
- Edwin Jackson (1989), professional basketball player
- Luc Louves, basketball player

=== People who died in Pau ===
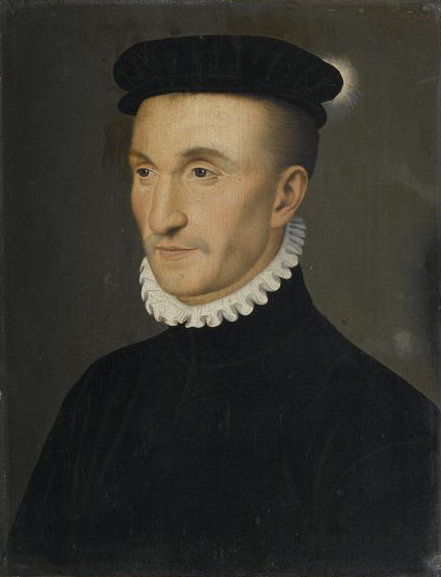
Henry II of Navarre, 1550

- Henry II of Navarre (1503–1555), nicknamed Sangüesino, the King of Navarre from 1517.
- Guillaume Dauture (1770–1820), general of the armies of the Republic and the Empire
- Thomas Douglas, 5th Earl of Selkirk FRS FRSE (1771–1820), a Scottish peer.
- Jean-Jacques Ampère (1800–1864), philologist and man of letters.
- Sir James Outram (1803–1863), British officer
- Eugène Devéria (1805–1865), painter
- Pierre Lanfrey (1828–1877), historian and politician.
- Caroline Duprez (1832–1875), soprano
- Nicolás Salmerón y Alonso (1838–1908), a Spanish politician, president of the First Spanish Republic.
- Alexandre Saint-Yves d'Alveydre (1842–1909), occultist
- Philippe Tissié (1852–1935), medical officer of health
- Mrs. Patrick Campbell (1865–1940), English actress
- Princess Zekiye Sultan (1872–1950), daughter of Ottoman sultan Abdulhamid II
- Moncef Bey (1881–1948), former Bey of Tunis (1942–1943)
- André Labarrère (1928–2006), politician
- Geneviève Immè (1929–2012), Contemporary Latin poet, honored by the Académie Française as winner of the Prix Théophile-Gautier in 1992
- Pierre Tucoo-Chala (1924–2015), historian

=== Others ===
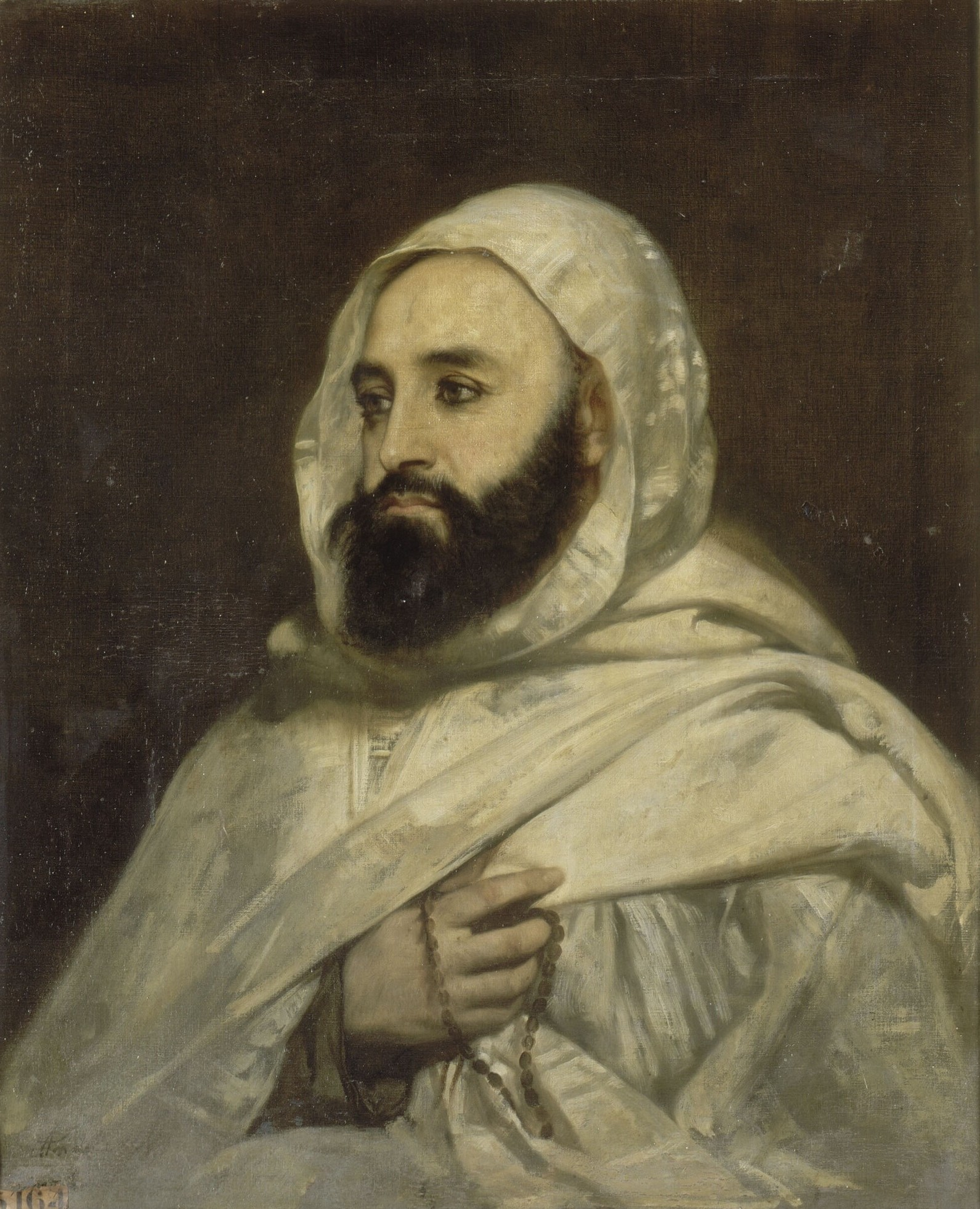
The emir Abd el-Kader, Algerian political and military leader

- The emir Abd el-Kader (1808–1883), was imprisoned in the castle of Pau in 1848
- Mary Todd Lincoln (1818–1882), lived in Pau between 1876 and 1880. She was the widow of American President Abraham Lincoln.
- Henry Russell (1834–1909), buried there
- Isidore Ducasse, Comte de Lautréamont (1846–1870), (author of Les Chants de Maldoror) studied there
- Louis Guédy (1847–1926), French painter, settled here during the end of the 19th century
- Louis Barthou (1862–1934), politician, lived in Pau
- Saint-John Perse (1887–1975), real name Alexis Saint-Léger lived here from 1899 to 1906, where he was a student at Lycée Louis-Barthou
- Dornford Yates (1885–1960), pseudonym of the British novelist, Cecil William Mercer lived here from 1922 to 1940
- Joseph Peyré (1892–1968), winner of the Prix Goncourt in 1935, native of Aydie, educated at the Lycée de Pau (1900–1907), taught there, and was lawyer for a time at the bar of Pau
- Hubert Dubedout (1922–1986), Mayor of Grenoble between 1965 and 1983, lived there
- Pierre Bourdieu (1930–2002), sociologist, who studied there
- Guy Debord (1931–1994), (author of The Society of the Spectacle) lived there in the 1940s
- Djamila Boupacha (1938), FLN combatant, imprisoned there in 1962 shortly before Independence was reached in Algeria
- Henri Emmanuelli (1945), politician, studied there
- François Bayrou (1951): municipal councillor of the city of Pau from 1983 to 1993 and then from 2008 to 2014, as well as president of the Conseil départemental des Pyrénées-Atlantiques from 1992 to 2001. Bayrou is the current mayor of Pau, his birthplace was Bordères
- Daniel Balavoine (1952–1986), native of Bizanos, studied there
- Léopold Eyharts (1957), astronaut, studied there
- Frédéric Beigbeder (1965), spent part of his childhood in Pau, living in the Villa Navarra, the family home was sold in 2002
- Wilfrid Lupano (1971), comic book writer, lives in Pau
- Léo Quievreux (1971), comic book writer, lives in Pau as of 2022
- Michaël Gregorio (1984), spent his childhood in Pau

== Gallery ==
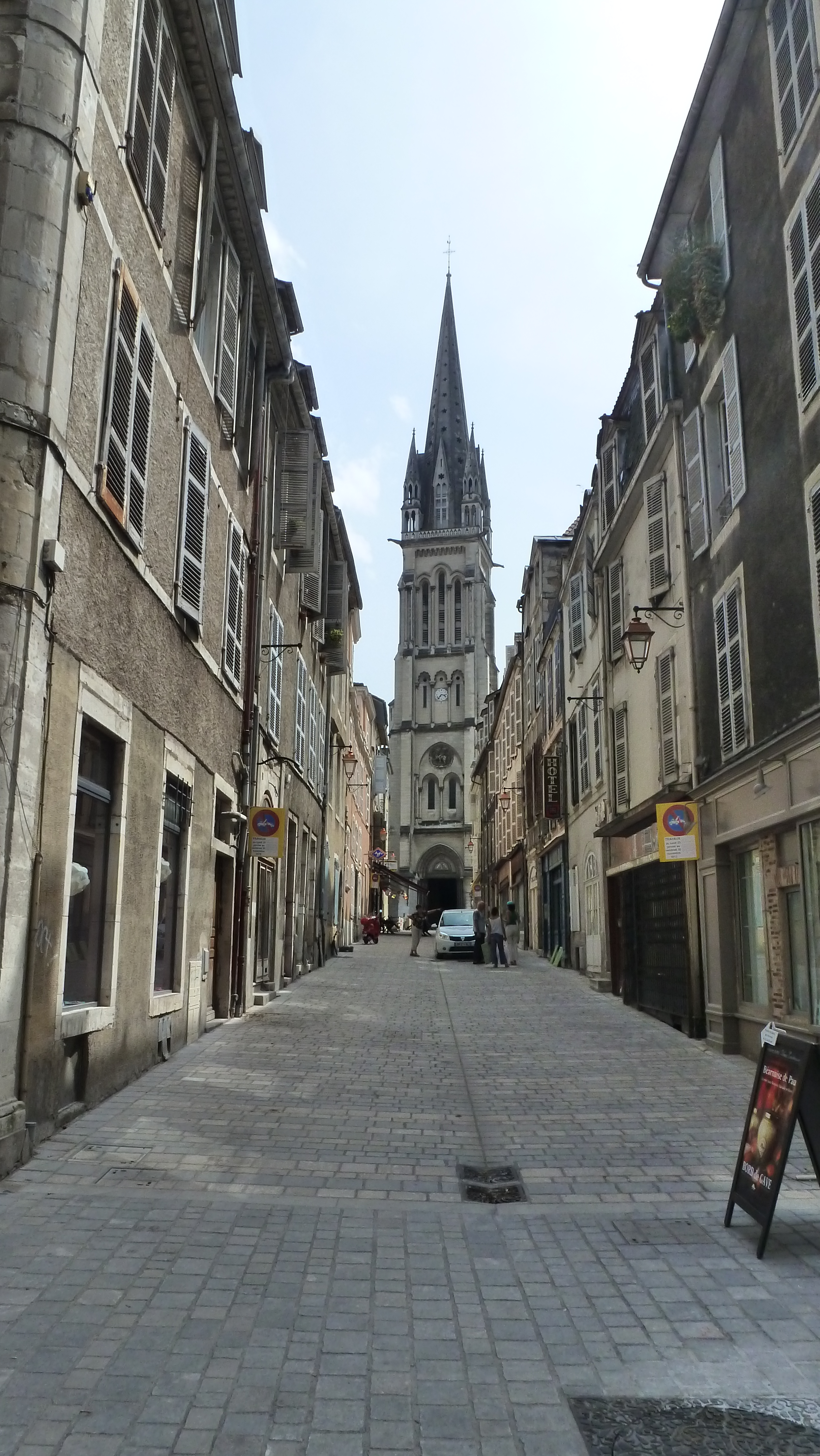
Rue Jeanne d'Albret and the Church of Saint-Martin

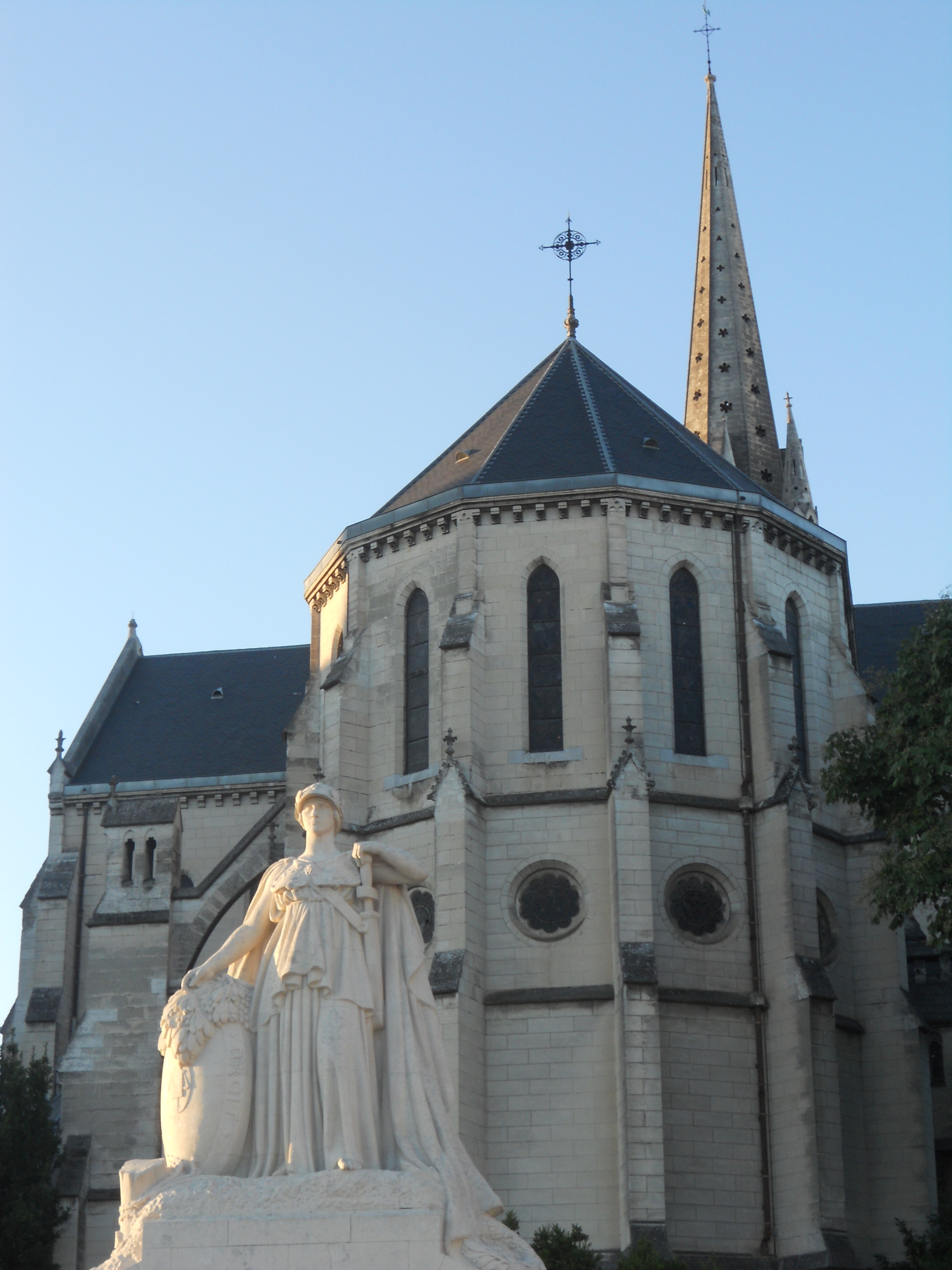
The Church of Saint-Martin and the war memorial

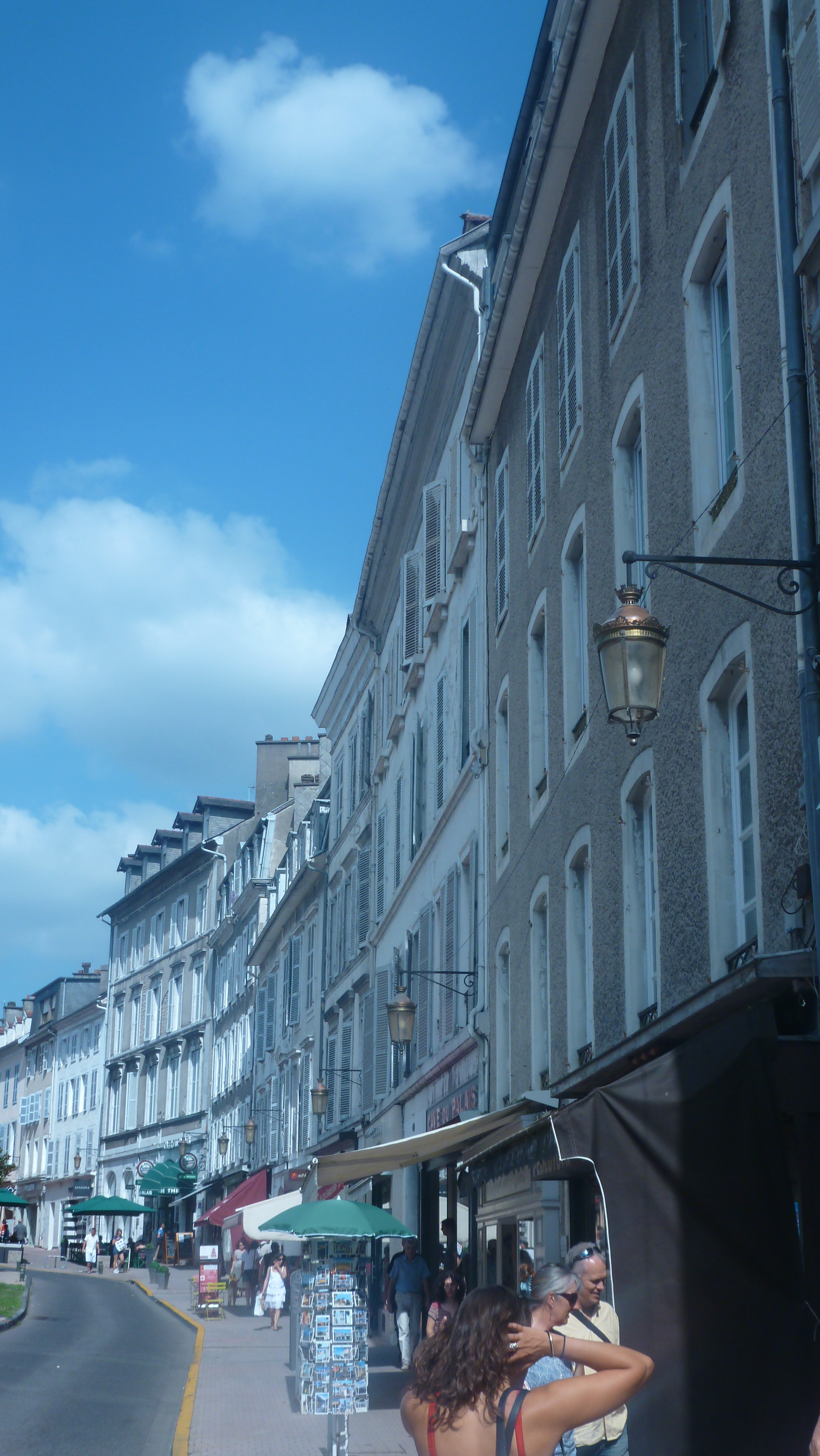
The Place de la Libération

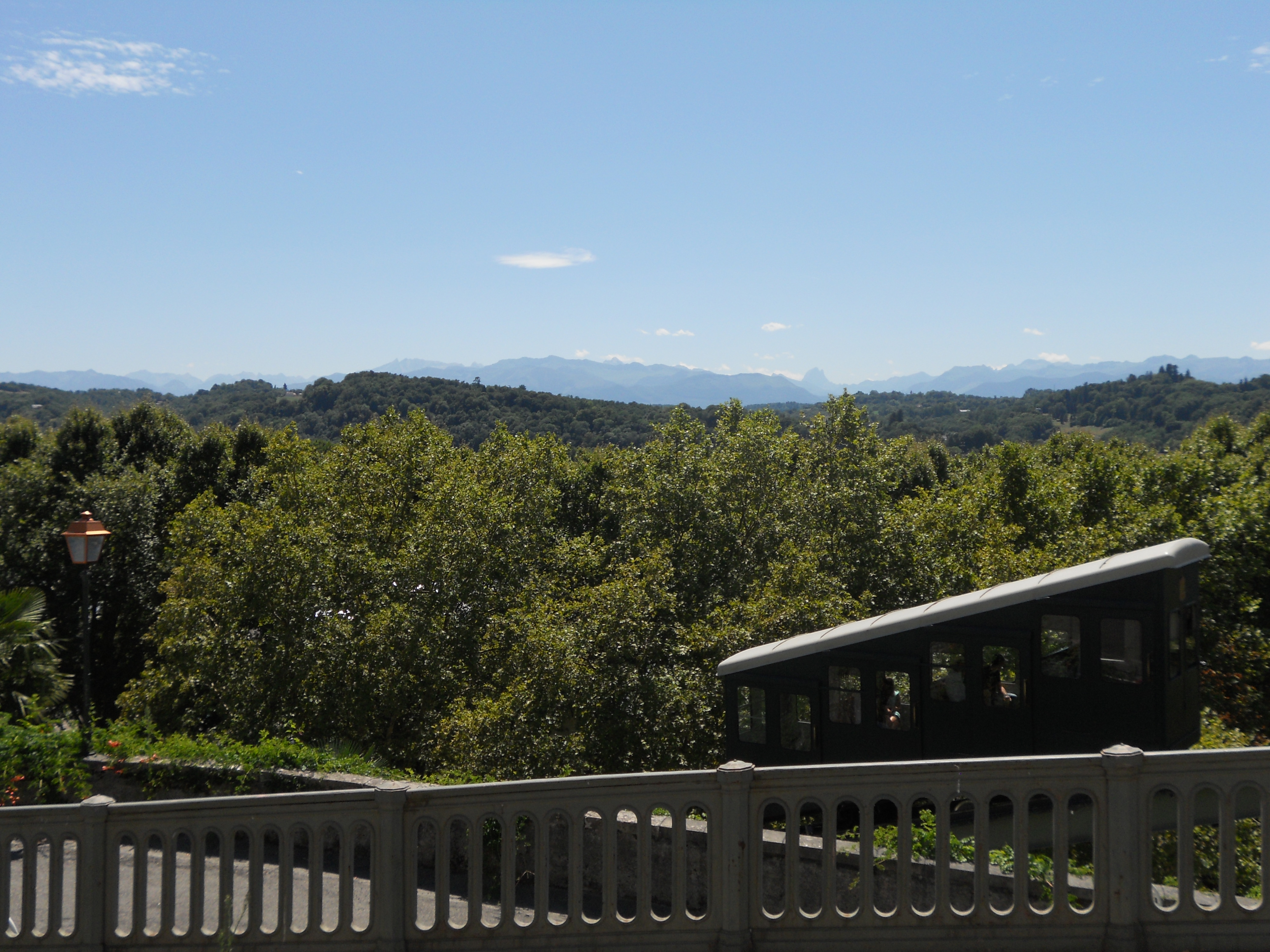
Funiculaire de Pau and a view of the Pyrénées

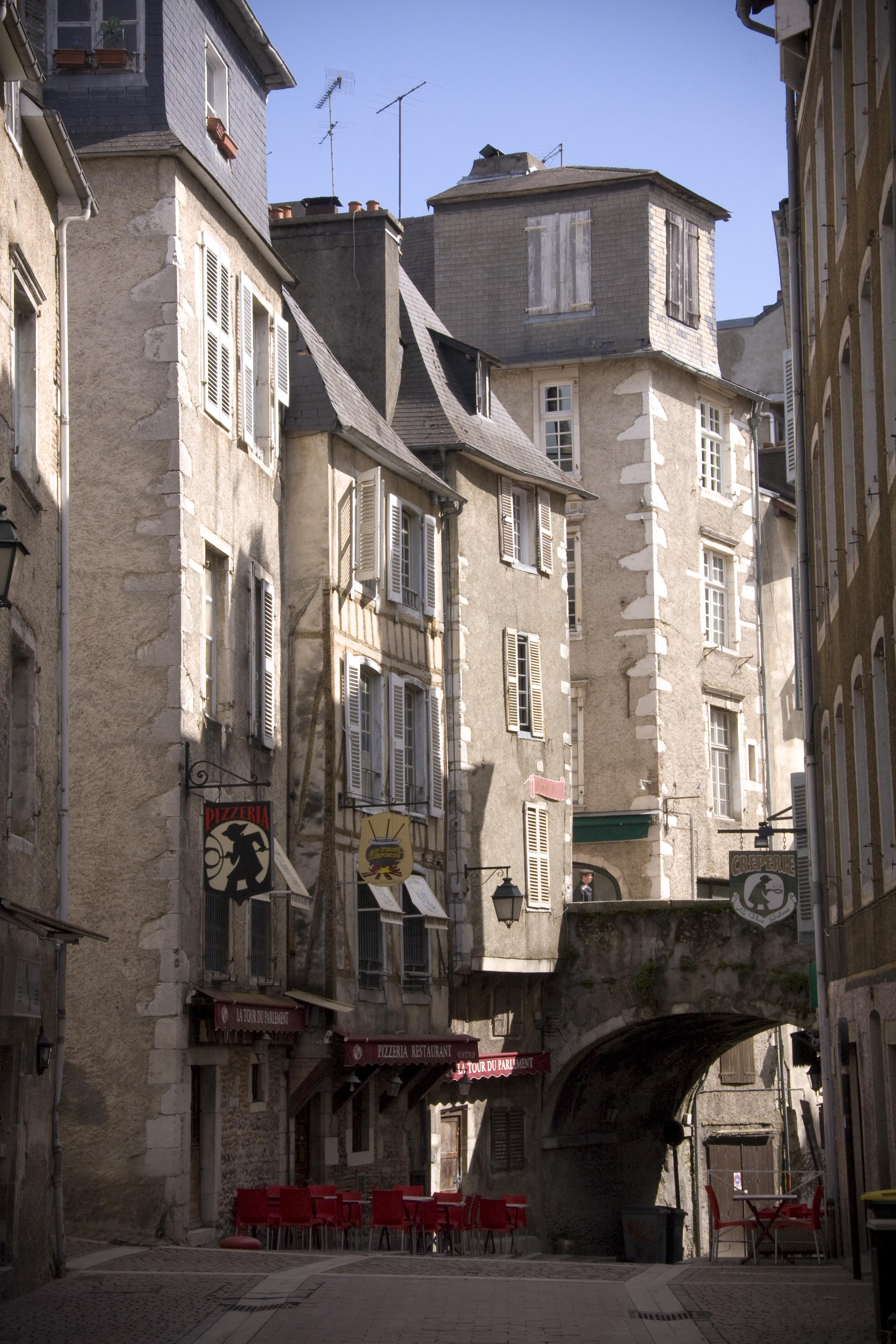
The quarter of the Château de Pau

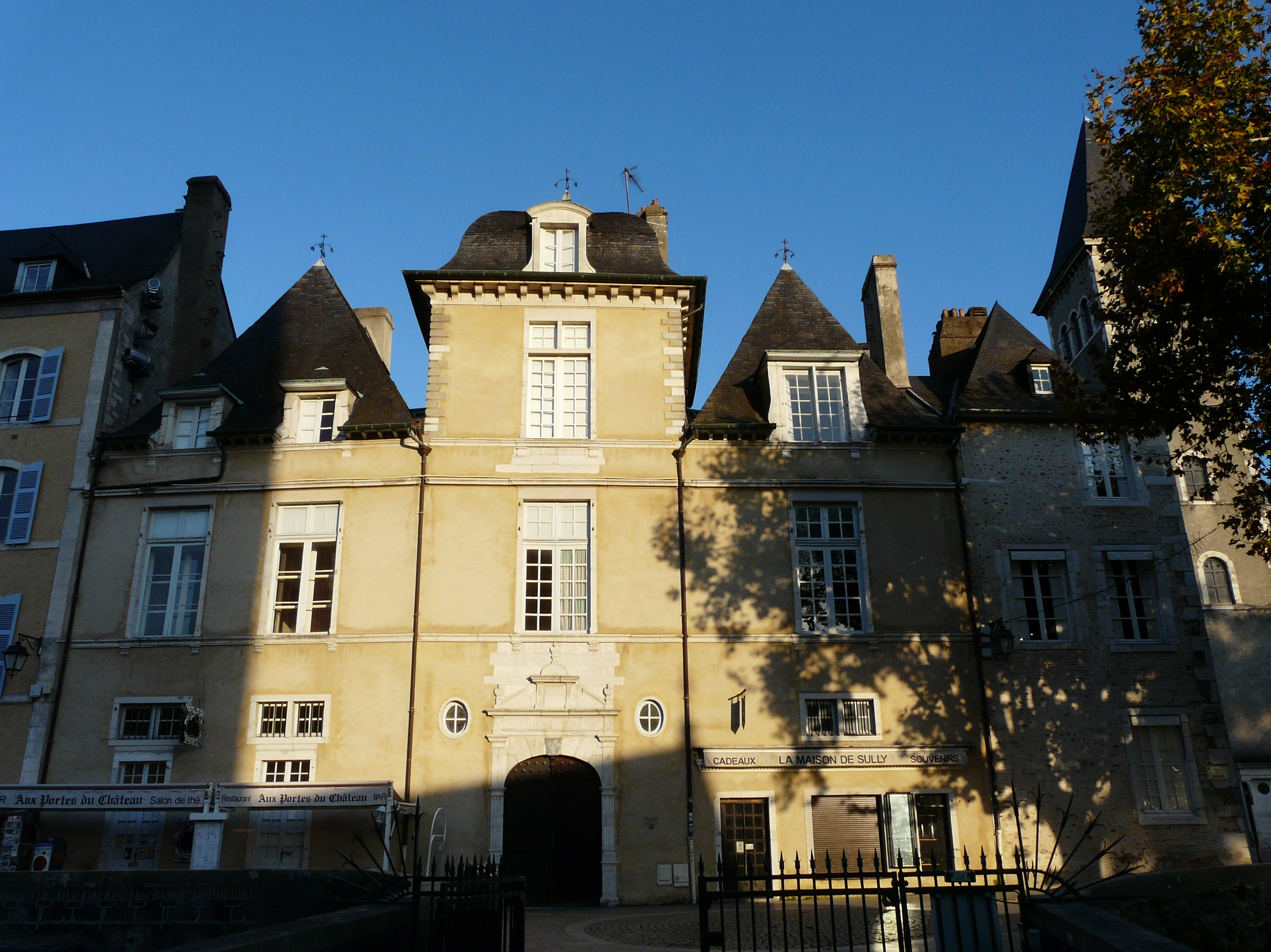
The Hôtel de Peyré facing the château

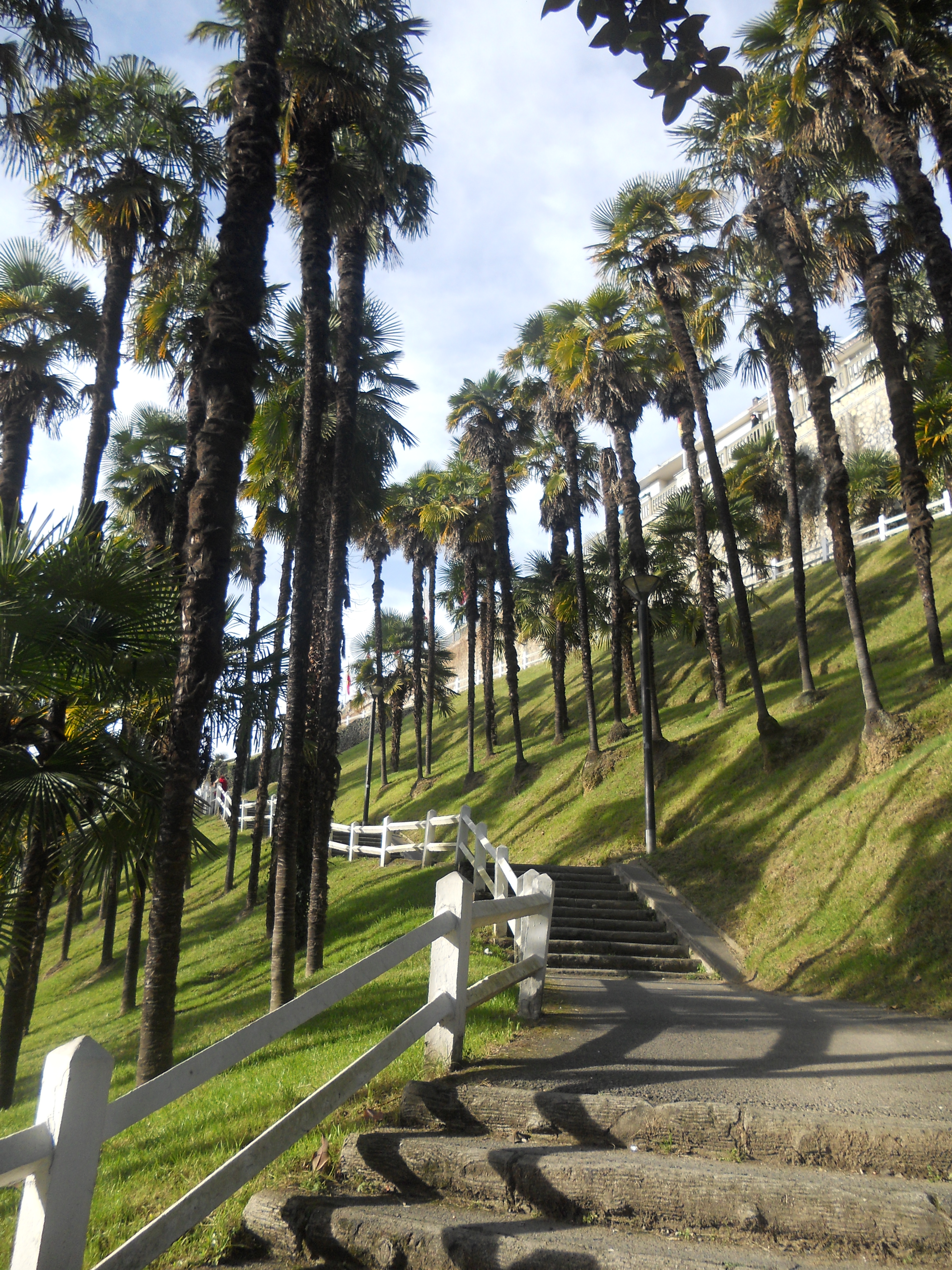
The Palmeraie des sentiers du Roy

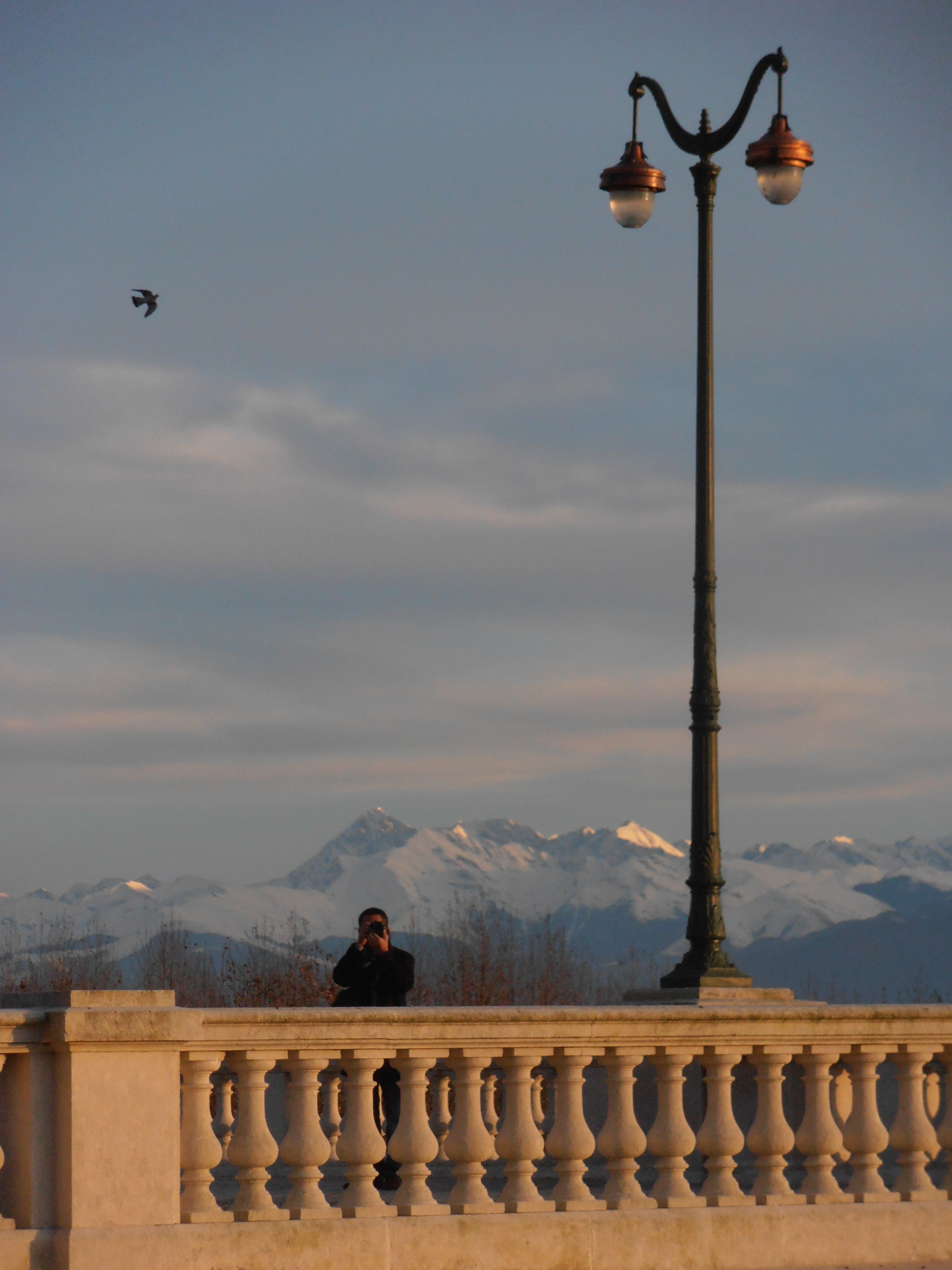
Terrace of the Pavilion des Arts and the Pic du Midi de Bigorre

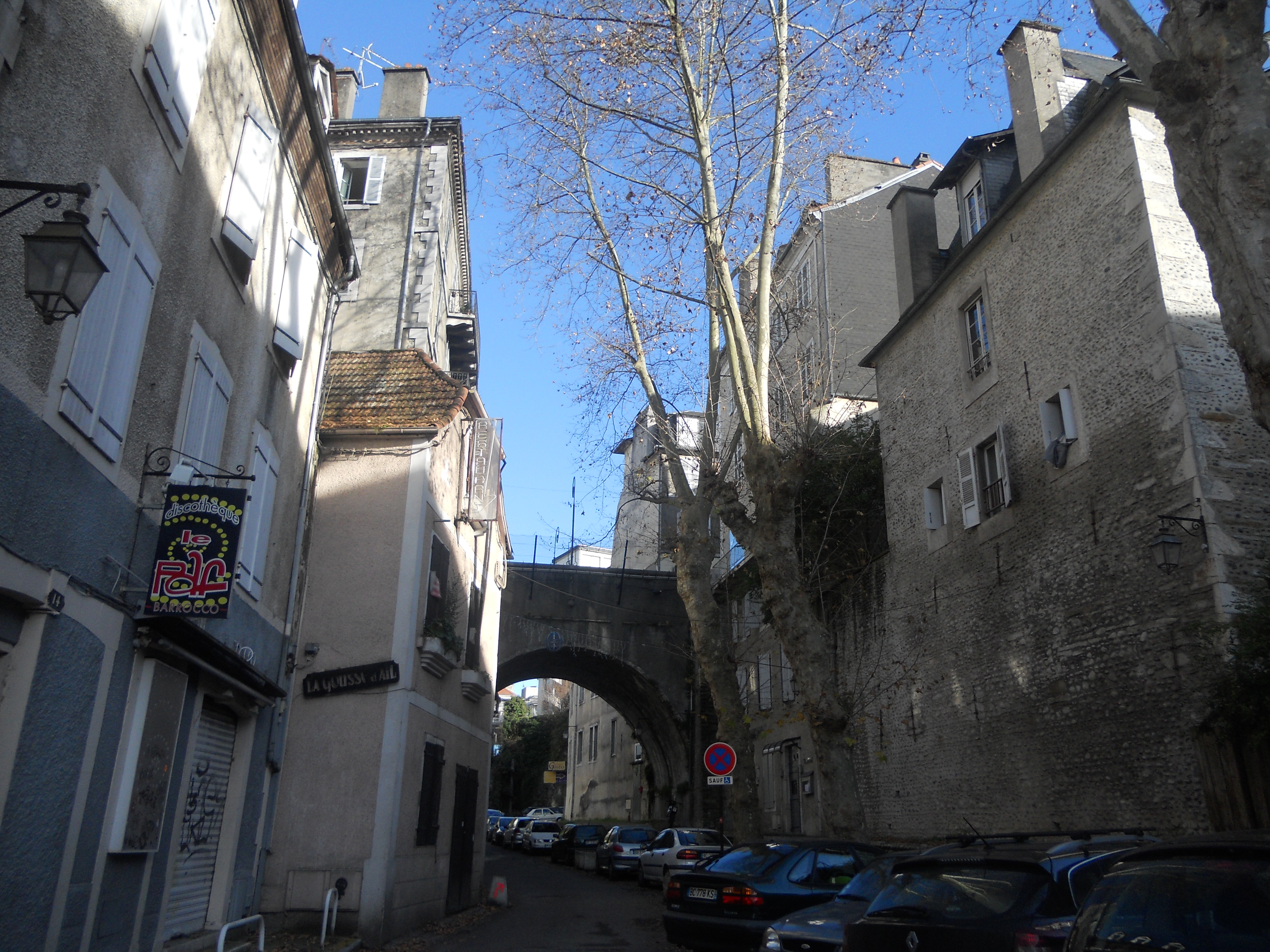
Quartier du Hédas

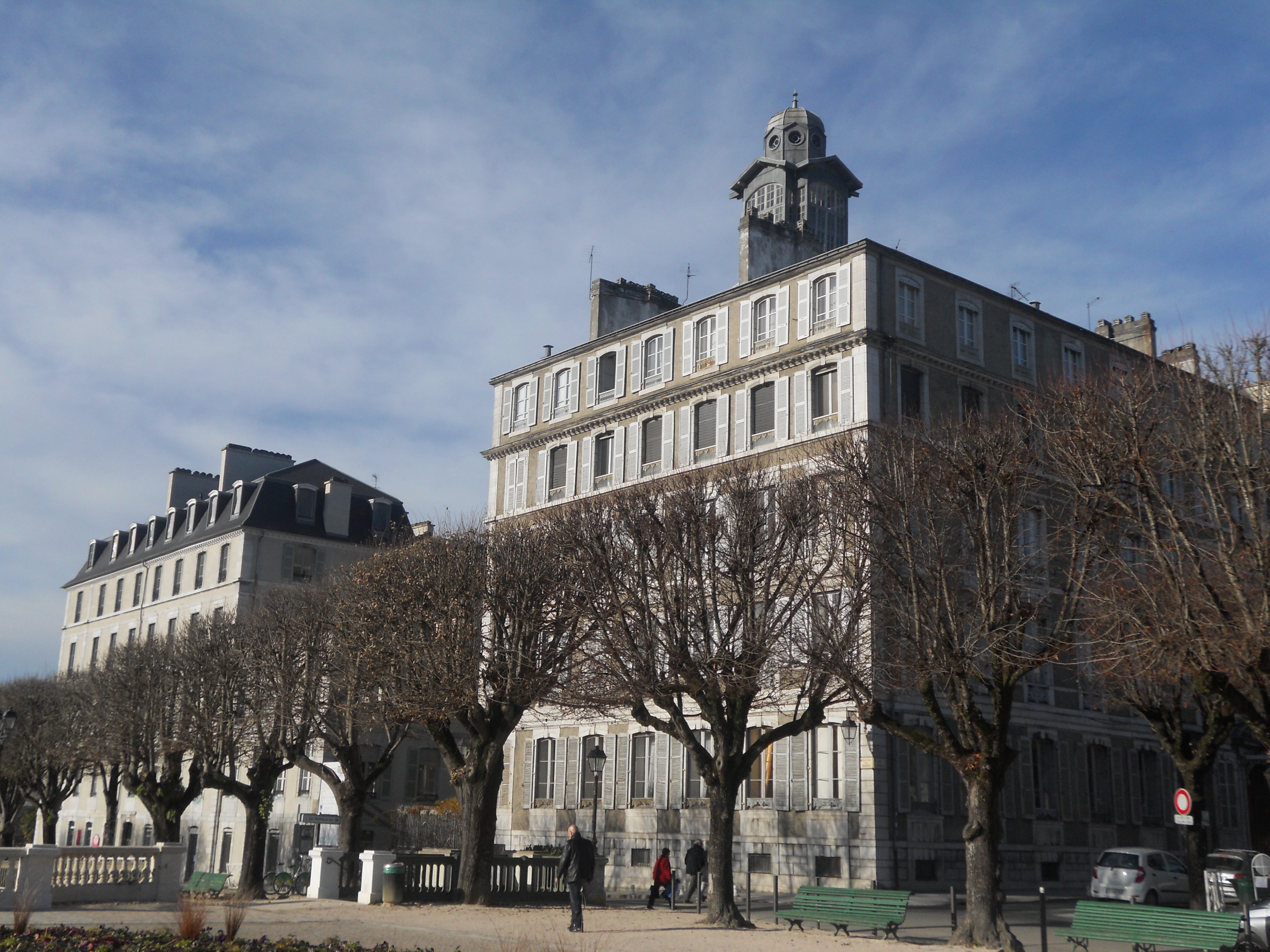
Buildings along the Boulevard des Pyrénées

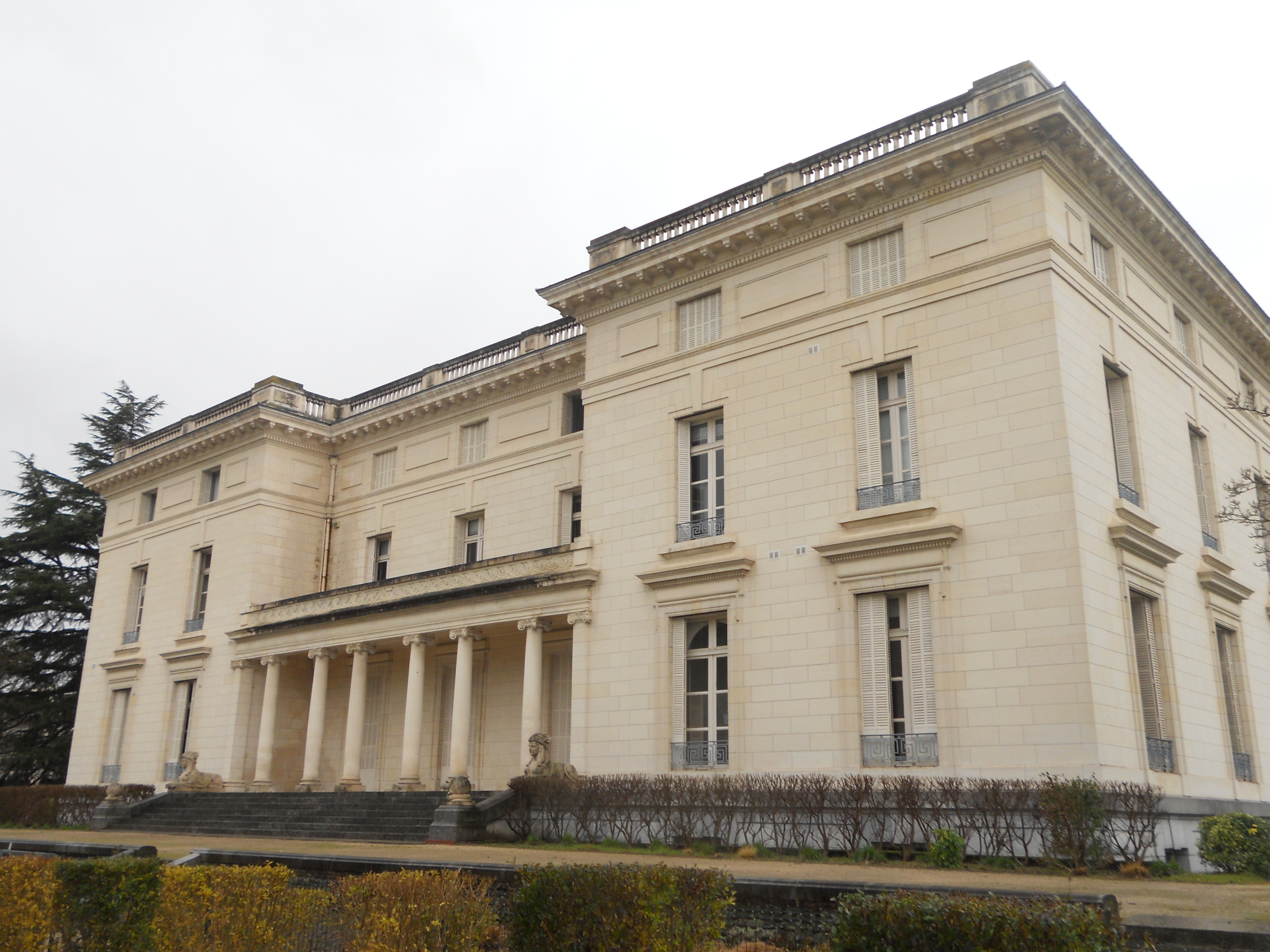
Villa Ridgway

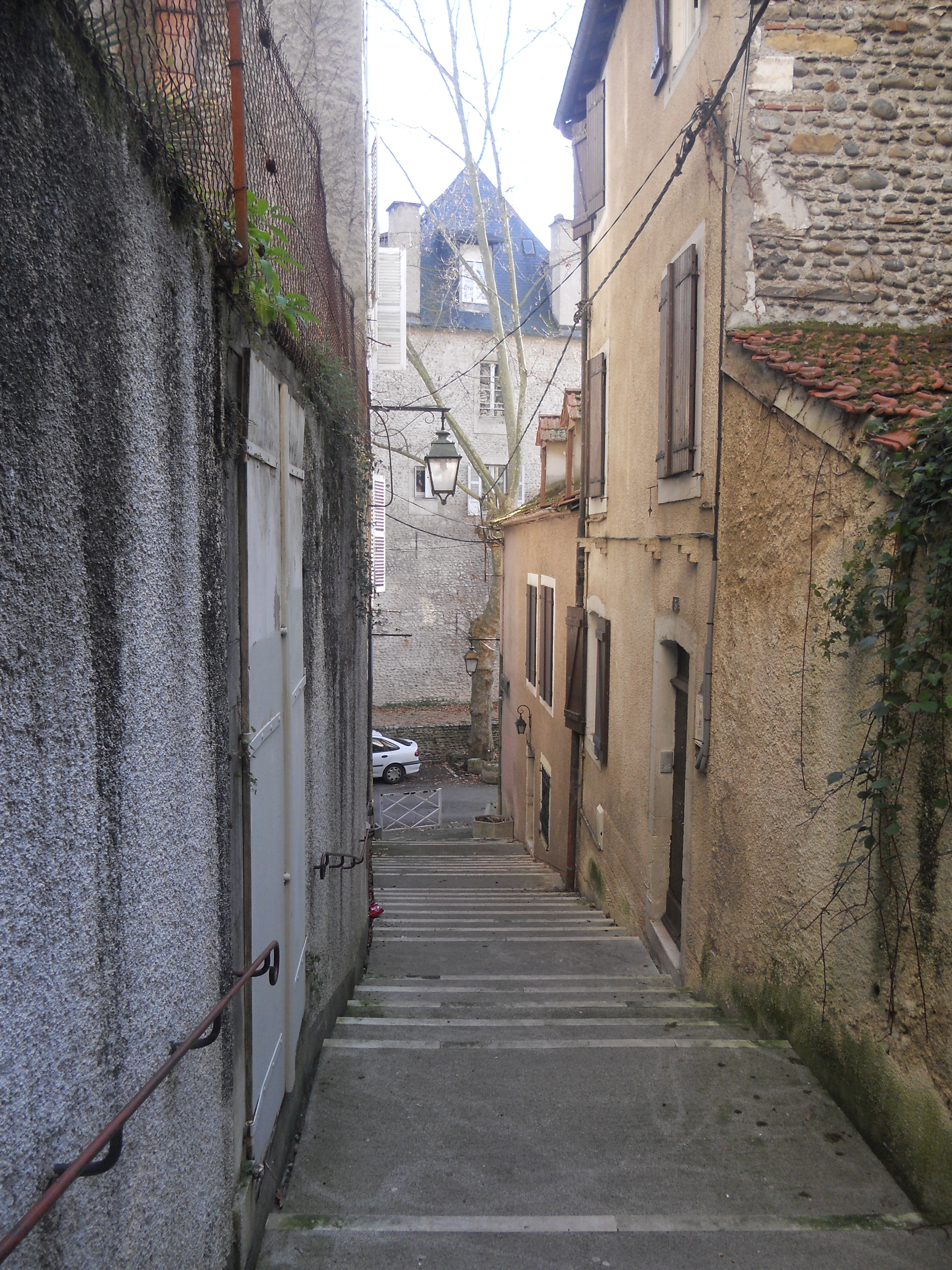
Passage Parentoy

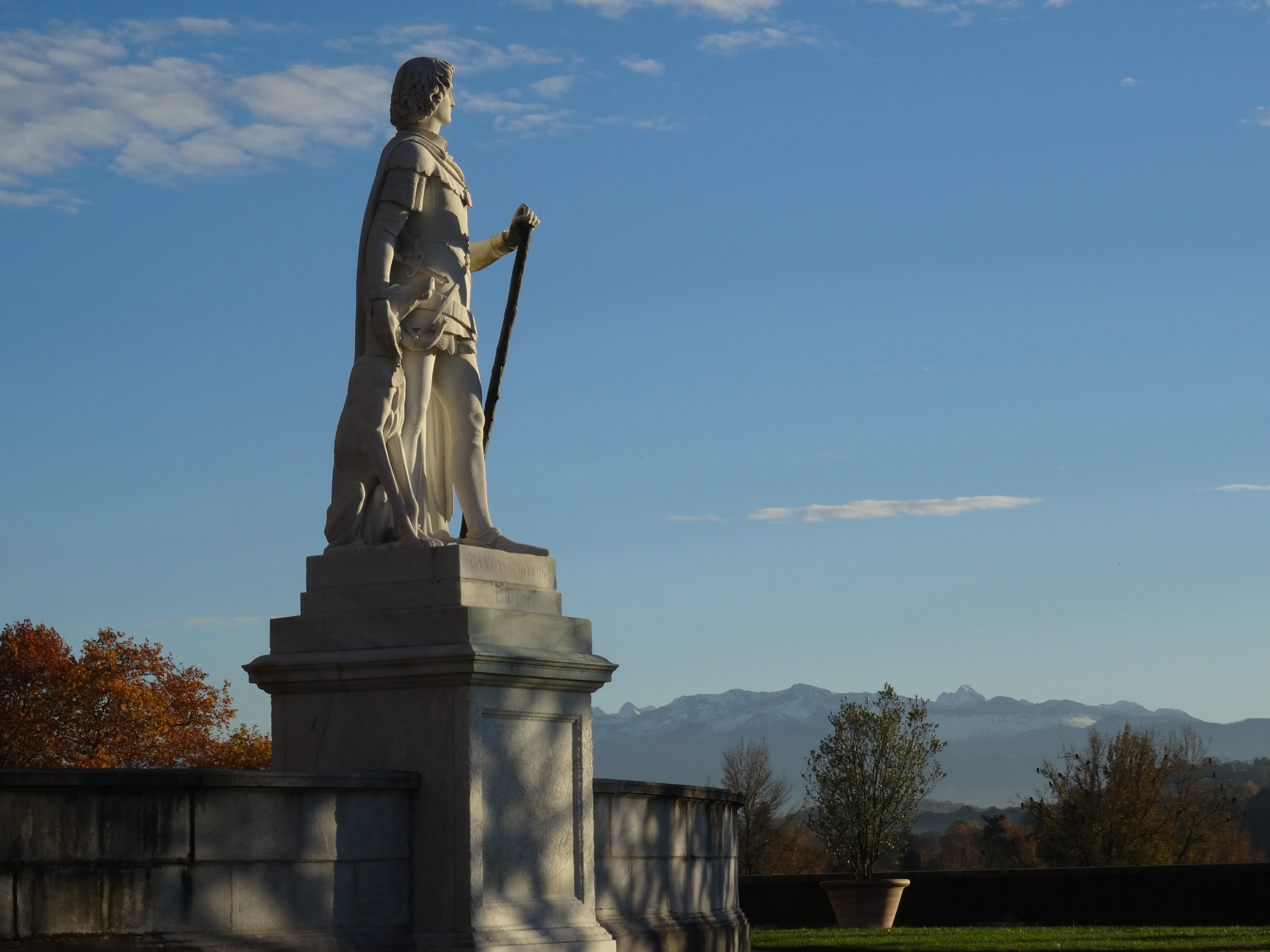
The Gaston Fébus statue facing the Pyrénées

== See also ==
- Communes of the Pyrénées-Atlantiques department
- Georges Vérez, sculptor of Pau War Memorial
- Chambre de commerce et d'industrie Pau Béarn
- Tramway de Pau

== Bibliography ==
- Saupiquet, Dr Amédée (2004). Petite histoire de Pau [A short history of Pau] (in French). Éditions PyréMonde – Princi Negue. ISBN 2-84618-168-3.
- Bouchard, Jean-Pierre (1988). Pau [Pau] (in French). Éditions Ouest-France.
- Issartel, Thierry; Bayrou, François; Bouchard, Jean-Pierre; et al. (2010). Henri IV, les clés d'un règne [Henry IV, the keys to a kingdom] (in French). Editions Gascogne.
