= Ousse (river) =

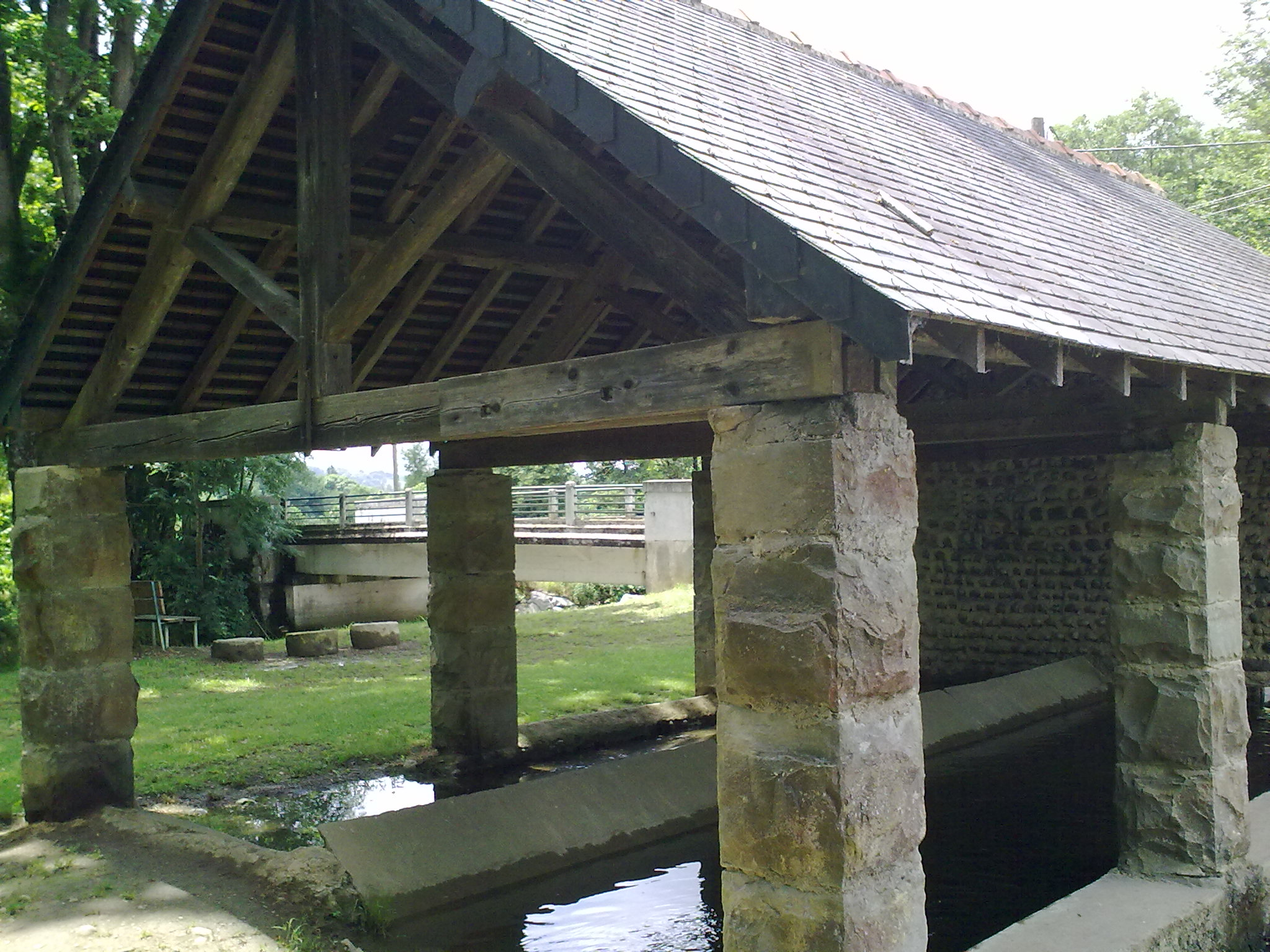

- Location within France Location within Nouvelle-Aquitaine

Location
- Country: France

Physical characteristics
- Source
  - location: Hautes-Pyrénées
  - coordinates: 43°6′52″N 0°3′14″W
- Mouth
  - location: Gave de Pau
  - coordinates: 43°17′31″N 0°22′21″W
- Length: 42 km (26 mi)

Basin features
- Progression: Gave de Pau→ Gaves réunis→ Adour→ Atlantic Ocean

The Ousse, is a right tributary of the Gave de Pau, in Béarn (Pyrénées-Atlantiques), in the southwest of France. It flows into the Gave at the foot of the Pau Castle. It is 42.4 km (26.3 mi) long.

== Name ==
The name Ousse is a common river name, probably derived from a former Ourse, that applies to many other rivers, as a tributary of the Gers.

The river left its name to the riverside commune Ousse.

== Geography ==
The Ousse rises in Bartrès, a few kilometres north of Lourdes, at an elevation of 492 metres (1,614 ft) above sea level.

It drains an old dry valley left by the Gave de Pau after the final installation of the moraine of Lourdes, during the Riss glaciation. During the previous Mindel glaciation, the Gave flowed through Pont-Long, an older dry valley on the north of the Ousse. The Ousse valley is separated from the Gave by littoral deposits dating from Ypresian to Miocene.

The Ousse meanders in its valley which has a very low slope. The drainage is improved by many ditches. Breeding is the main activity.

The Ousse flows into the Gave in the town of Pau.

== Départements and towns ==
- Hautes-Pyrénées: Bartrès, Loubajac, Barlest,
- Pyrénées-Atlantiques: Pontacq, Barzun, Livron, Espoey, Gomer, Soumoulou, Nousty, Artigueloutan, Ousse, Lée, Idron, Bizanos, Pau.

== Main tributaries ==
- (R) Barrade or Oussère, at Pontacq
- (L) Louroû, at Gomer, from Labatmale
