= Philibert de Gramont =

French count (1621–1707)

- Count of Gramont
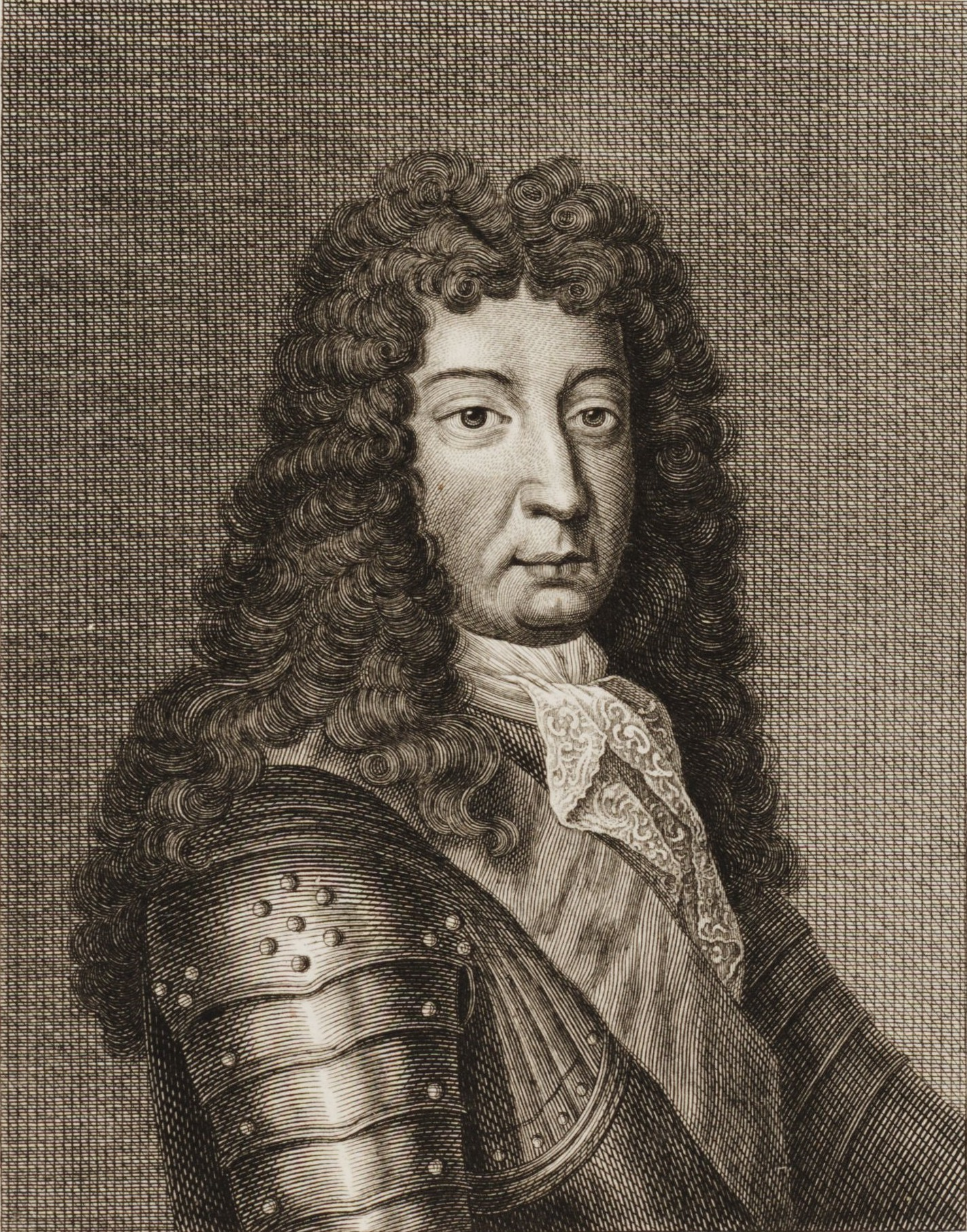
- Detail from the portrait below
- Born: 1621
- Died: 30 January 1707 (aged 85–86); Paris
- Spouse: Elizabeth, Countess de Gramont
- Issue Detail: Claude Charlotte & Marie Élisabeth
- Father: Antoine II de Gramont
- Mother: Claude de Montmorency-Bouteville

Philibert, Count de Gramont (1621–1707), was a French courtier and soldier, known as the protagonist of the Mémoires written by Anthony Hamilton (his brother-in-law). He was a younger half-brother of Antoine III of Gramont and uncle of Catherine Charlotte de Gramont, princess of Monaco.

== Birth and origins ==
Philibert was born in 1621, probably at the Château de Bidache, the second son of Antoine II de Gramont and his second wife, Claude de Montmorency-Bouteville. His father was the head of the Gramont family and ruler of the Principality of Bidache. At the time of Philibert's birth his father was count of Guiche but later became duke of Gramont. His first wife had been Louise de Roquelaure.

Philibert's mother was his father's second wife. She was the eldest daughter of Louis de Montmorency-Bouteville, baron of Bouteville, and sister of François de Montmorency-Bouteville. The Montmorency-Boutevilles were a cadet branch of the House of Montmorency.

Philibert's paternal grandmother, Diane d'Andouins, comtesse de Guiche, was "la belle Corisande," one of the mistresses of Henry IV. The grandson assumed that his father, Antoine II de Gramont, viceroy of Navarre, was a son of Henry IV, and regretted that his father had not claimed the privileges of royal paternity.

Family tree

Philibert de Gramont with wife, children, parents, and other selected relatives. (Note: This family tree is partly derived from the Gramont family tree in Lewis (1958). Also see the list of children in the text.)

Philibert comte de Guiche; 1552–1580 | Diane d'Andouins; 1554–1621
Louise de Roquelaure d. 1610 | Antoine II; Duke of Gramont; 1572–1644 | Claude de Montmorency d. 1652
Antoine III; Duke of Gramont; 1604–1678 | Henri count of Toulongeon d. 1679 | Philibert de Gramont; 1621–1707 | Elizabeth; Hamilton; 1641–1708
Antoine; Charles IV; Duke of Gramont; 1641–1720 | Henry; 1st Earl; Stafford c. 1648 – 1719 | Claude; Charlotte d. 1739 | Marie; Elizabeth; 1667–1729; Abbess
Antoine V Duke of Gramont; 1672–1725

| Legend |

| XXX | Subject of the article | XXX | Comtes et ducs de Gramont | XXX | Earls of Stafford |

His parents had married in 1618. Philibert was one of six full siblings and also had two half brothers from his father's first marriage. See the lists in his father's article but also Antoine, duke of Gramont, his eldest half-brother, by himself.

== Early life ==
Philibert was destined for the church, and was educated at the college of Pau, in Béarn. He refused the ecclesiastical life, however, and joined the army of Prince Thomas of Savoy, then in 1643 besieging Trino in Piedmont. He afterwards served under his elder half-brother, Antoine, Marshal Gramont, and the prince de Condé. He was present at the battles of Freiburg and Nördlingen, and served with distinction in Spain and Flanders in 1647. In 1654 he fought at Arras where Turenne relieved the town besieged by the Spanish.

Philibert favoured Condé's party at the beginning of the Fronde, but changed sides before he was too severely compromised. Despite his record in the army, he never received any important commission either military or diplomatic. He was, however, made governor of the Pays d'Aunis and lieutenant of Béarn. He visited England during the Commonwealth.

== Exile and marriage ==
In 1662 Philibert was exiled from France for courting Anne-Lucie de la Mothe-Houdancourt, one of the king's mistresses. He went to England where he found at the court of Charles II an atmosphere congenial to his talents for intrigue, gallantry and pleasure. He arrived in London in January 1663. Philibert quickly entered into the English court's inner circle. Not much adaptation was needed as French was the predominant language at the Restoration court. Philibert courted Anthony's sister Elizabeth.

An anecdote tells how Philibert tried to leave her but was intercepted by her brothers George and Anthony at Dover. They asked him whether he had not forgotten something in London. He replied "Pardonnez-moi, messieurs, j'ai oublié d'épouser votre sœur." (Forgive me, Sirs, I have forgotten to marry your sister). This episode might have occurred in autumn 1663 when Gramont's sister Susanne-Charlotte in error told him that he could return to France. He went but found that he was not welcome. However, perhaps Philibert attempted to leave Elizabeth later, in December just before he consented to marry her. It has been said that this incident suggested to Molière his comedy Le mariage forcé, first presented 29 January 1664.

Philibert married Elizabeth in London in December 1663 or early in 1664. In March 1664, having heard of his marriage, Louis XIV allowed Philibert to come back. On 28 August the couple had a son who died as an infant.

== Back in France ==
In 1664 Philibert was allowed to return to France. He revisited England in 1670 in connection with the Sale of Dunkirk, and again in 1671 and 1676. In 1688 he was sent by Louis XIV to congratulate James II on the birth of an heir. From all these small diplomatic missions he succeeded in obtaining considerable profits, being destitute, and having no scruples whenever money was in question.

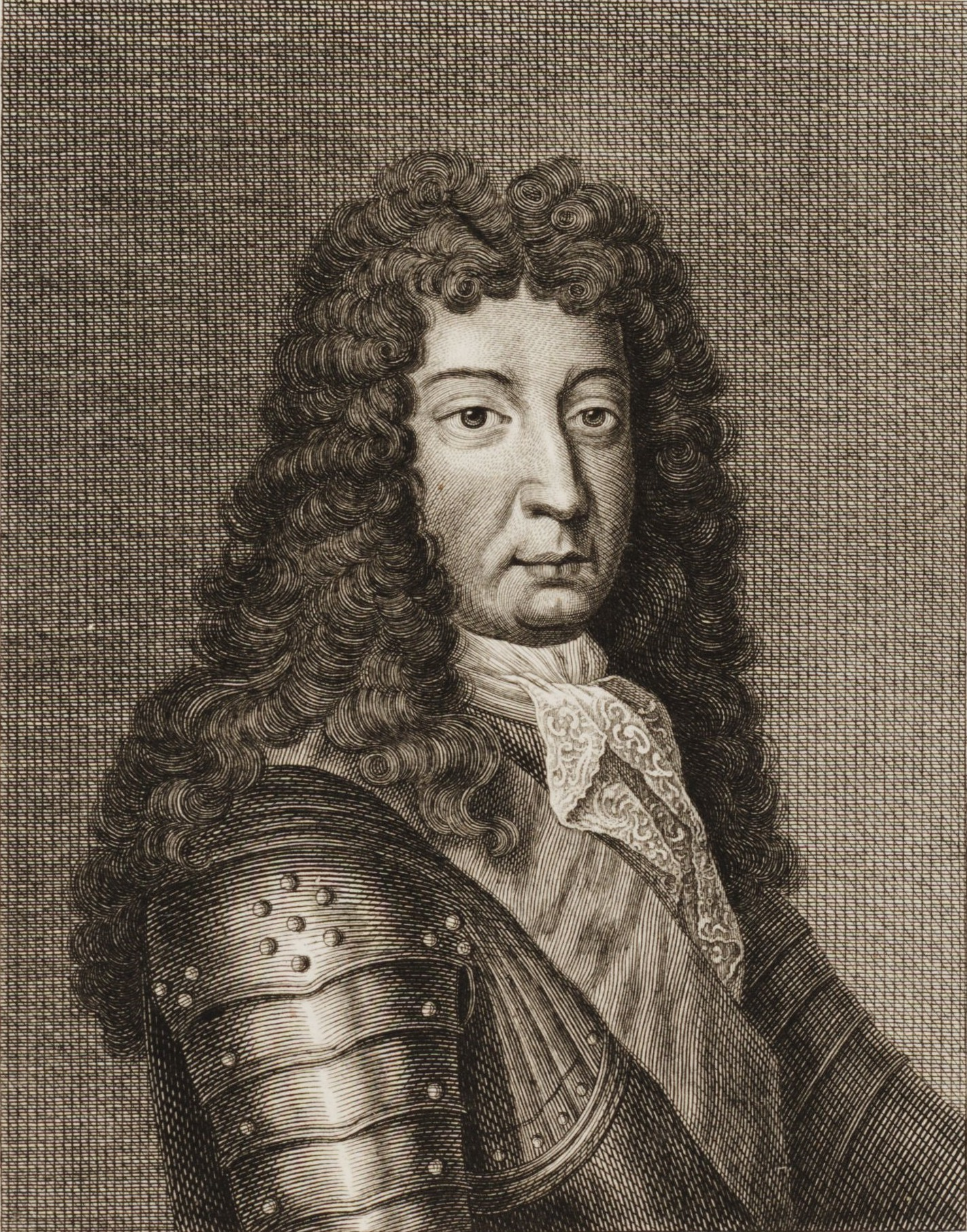
Philibert de Gramont wearing the cordon-bleu

In June 1673, during the Franco-Dutch War (1672–1678), Philibert fought at the Siege of Maastricht in which Louis XIV took the town from the Dutch.

In 1679, Philibert succeeded his elder brother Henri, count of Toulongeon, who died unmarried. Thereafter, he called himself "Comte de Gramont" instead of "Chevalier de Gramont". Henri also had bequeathed him his lands, and he inherited the château at Séméac.

On 31 December 1688 Count Gramont was made a knight of the Order of the Holy Spirit in a ceremony performed in the Chapel of the Château de Versailles. This gave him the right to wear the blue sash called the cordon bleu that hangs over his right shoulder on his portrait.

At the age of 75, he fell dangerously ill, which caused him to become reconciled to the church. His penitence does not seem to have survived his recovery.

== Children ==
His wife gave him two children, daughters both:

1. Claude Charlotte (c. 1665 – 1739), who married Henry Stafford-Howard, 1st Earl of Stafford She died on 14 May 1739 and was buried at St James, Westminster.
2. Marie Élisabeth (1667–1729), who in 1695 became abbess of the Chapter of Poussay in Lorraine

Both were maids-of-honour to Maria Anna Victoria of Bavaria, whom the Grand Dauphin married in 1680. Saint-Simon comments that they did not have much success at the court.

He also had a bastard daughter, born in Piedmont, at the siege of Trino: Giacomo or Jacques, daughter of Countess Theresia de' Medici, granddaughter of don Antonio de' Medici via his son Antonfrancesco.

== Memoirs ==
Coat of arms of Philibert de Gramont.

Count Gramont was 80 years old when he supplied his brother-in-law, Anthony Hamilton, with the material for his Mémoires. Hamilton pretended that they had been dictated to him, but no doubt he was the real author. The account of Gramont's early career was doubtless provided by himself, but Hamilton was probably more familiar with the history of the court of Charles II, which forms the most interesting part of the book. Moreover, Gramont, though he had a reputation for wit, was no writer, and there is no reason to suppose that he was capable of producing a work that remains a masterpiece of style and of witty portraiture.

His biographer Hamilton was far superior as a writer to Count Gramont, but he relates the story of his hero without comment, and no condemnation of the prevalent code of morals is allowed to appear, unless by an occasional touch of irony. The portrait is drawn with such skill that the count, despite his biographer's candour, imposes by his grand air on the reader much as he appears to have done on his contemporaries. The book is the most entertaining of contemporary memoirs, and in no other book is there a description so vivid, truthful, and graceful of the licentious court of Charles II. There are other and less flattering accounts of the count. His scandalous tongue knew no restraint, and he was a privileged person who was allowed to state even the most unpleasing truths to Louis XIV.

When the Mémoires were completed, it is said that Gramont sold the manuscript for 1500 francs; and kept most of the money for himself. Fontenelle, then censor of the press, refused to license the book from considerations of respect to the strange old man, whose gambling, cheating and meanness were so ruthlessly exposed. But Gramont himself appealed to the chancellor and the prohibition was lifted.

== Death and timeline ==
Gramont died in the night from 29 to 30 January 1707 in Paris, and the Mémoires appeared six years later.

Timeline
Dates, even those referring to his stay in England, are in New Style. Italics for historical background.
| Age | Date | Event |
| 0 | 1621 | Born |
| 21–22 | 14 May 1643 | Death of Louis XIII; Regency until the majority of Louis XIV |
| 21–22 | 1643 | Fought at the siege of Trino. |
| 21–22 | 13 Dec 1643 | Father created duc de Gramont |
| 22–23 | 3–9 Aug 1644 | Fought at Freiburg. |
| 22–23 | 16 Aug 1644 | Father died at the Château de Séméac. |
| 23–24 | 3 Aug 1645 | Fought at Nördlingen |
| 29–30 | 3 Sep 1651 | Majority of Louis XIV, end of his mother’s regency. |
| 30–31 | 3 Apr 1652 | Mother died. |
| 32–33 | 25 Aug 1654 | Fought at Arras where Turenne relieved the town besieged by the Spanish. |
| 41–42 | Jan 1663 | Came to live at the court of Charles II of England at Whitehall. |
| 42–43 | 1664 | Married Elizabeth Hamilton. |
| 42–43 | 7 Sep 1664 | Birth of a son who died in his infancy. |
| 43–44 | About 1665 | First daughter, Claude Charlotte, born. |
| 45–46 | 27 Dec 1667 | Second daughter, Marie Elisabeth, born |
| 46–47 | 1668 | Took part in the conquest of the Franche Comté. |
| 51–52 | 15–30 Jun 1673 | Fought at the Siege of Maastricht. |
| 57–58 | 1 Sep 1679 | Succeeded brother Henri as count and inherited the Château de Séméac. |
| 66–67 | 31 Dec 1688 | Made a knight of the Order of the Holy Spirit |
| 72–73 | 3 Apr 1694 | Daughter Claude Charlotte married Henry Stafford-Howard, 1st Earl of Stafford. |
| 82–83 | 1704 | Told his life to Anthony Hamilton, who wrote the Mémoires du comte de Grammont. |
| 85–86 | 30 Jan 1707 | Died in Paris |

== Notes and references ==
=== Sources ===
- Adams, W. H. Davenport (1865). "Elizabeth Hamilton, Countess of Grammont". Famous Beauties and Historic Women, a Gallery of Croquis Biographiques. Vol. I. London: Charles J. Skeet. pp. 67–84. OCLC 556759343.
- Anselme (1733). Histoire généalogique et chronologique de la maison royale de France [Genealogical and Chronological History of the Royal House of France] (in French). Vol. Tome neuvième (Troisième édition ed.). Paris: Compagnie des libraires associez. OCLC 831196155. – Knights of the Order of the Holy Spirit and general index
- Auger, L. S. (1805). "Notice sur la vie et les ouvrages d'Hamilton" [Note on Hamilton's Life and Work]. In Auger, Louis-Simon (ed.). Œuvres complètes d'Hamilton [Complete works of Hamilton] (in French). Vol. Tome premier. Paris: Colnet, Fain, Mongie, Debray & Delaunai. pp. 1–30. OCLC 848652758.
- Brunet, Gustave (1883). "Introduction". Mémoires du chevalier de Grammont (in French). Paris: G Charpentier. pp. i–xliv.
- Chisholm, Hugh, ed. (1911). "Gramont, Philibert, Comte de" . Encyclopædia Britannica. Vol. 12 (11th ed.). Cambridge University Press. pp. 332–333.
- Clark, Ruth (1921). Anthony Hamilton: his Life and Works and his Family. London: John Lane. OCLC 459281163.
- Corp, Edward (2004a). "Hamilton, Elizabeth, Countess de Gramont". In Matthew, Colin; Harrison, Brian (eds.). Oxford Dictionary of National Biography. Vol. 24. New York: Oxford University Press. pp. 786–787. ISBN 0-19-861374-1.
- Corp, Edward (2004b). A Court in Exile: The Stuarts in France, 1689-1718. Cambridge: Cambridge University Press. ISBN 0-521-58462-0.
- Dangeau (1854). Conches, Feuillet de (ed.). Journal du marquis de Dangeau [Diary of the Marquess of Dangeau] (in French). Vol. Tome Premier. Paris: Firmin Didot Frères. OCLC 310446765. – 1684 to 1686
- Dangeau (1857). Conches, Feuillet de (ed.). Journal du marquis de Dangeau [Diary of the Marquess of Dangeau] (in French). Vol. Tome Onzième. Paris: Firmin Didot Frères. OCLC 310446765. – 1706 to 1707
- Gaspard, Émile (1871). Abbaye et Chapitre de Poussay (in French). Nancy: Crépin-Leblond.
- G. E. C. (1896). Complete Peerage of England, Scotland, Ireland, Great Britain and the United Kingdom, Extant, Extinct, or Dormant. Vol. VII (1st ed.). London: George Bell and Sons. OCLC 1180891114. – S to T (for Stafford)
- Goubert, Pierre (1984). Initiation à l’histoire de la France [Initiation to the History of France] (in French). Paris: Fayard-Tallandier. ISBN 978-2-235-01484-7. – (for timeline)
- Hamilton, Anthony (1713). Mémoires de la vie du comte de Grammont (in French). Cologne: Pierre Marteau. OCLC 1135254578. – Princeps
- Hartmann, Cyril Hughes (1930). "The Chronology of the Memoirs of Comte de Gramont". Memoirs of the Comte de Gramont. London: E. P. Dutton and Company. pp. 370–378. OCLC 1150292676. – Appendix by Hartmann to Hamilton's Memoirs translated by Quennell
- Jusserand, J. J. (1892). A French Ambassador at the Court of Charles the Second. London: T. Fisher Unwin. OCLC 1101217680.
- La Chenaye-Desbois (1866). Dictionnaire de la noblesse [Dictionary of Nobility] (in French). Vol. Tome neuvième (3rd ed.). Paris: Schlesinger Frères. OCLC 797014713. – GAR to GUE (for Gramont)
- Laporte, Hyppolyte de (1857). "Gramont (Philibert, comte de)". In Michaud, Louis Gabriel (ed.). Biographie universelle ancienne et moderne (in French). Vol. Tome dix-septième (Nouvelle ed.). Paris: Madame C. Desplaces. pp. 324–325. OCLC 654775774.
- Lewis, W. H. (1958). Assault on Olympus: The rise of the House of Gramont between 1604 and 1678. New York: Harcourt, Brace & Co. OCLC 1147740696.
- Louis XIV (1806). Oeuvres de Louis XIV (in French). Vol. V. Paris: Treuttel & Würtz. OCLC 311560829.
- Michel, Francisque Xavier (1862). Les Écossais en France (in French). Vol. Deuxième. Paris: Librairie A. Franck. OCLC 954640622.
- Paul, Sir James Balfour (1904). The Scots Peerage, Founded on Wood's Edition of Sir Robert Douglas's Peerage of Scotland. Vol. I. Edinburgh: David Douglas. OCLC 505064285. – Abercorn to Balmerino
- Rigg, J. M. (1890). "Hamilton, Elizabeth, Comtesse de Gramont (1641–1708)". In Lee, Sidney (ed.). Dictionary of National Biography. Vol. XXIV. New York: MacMillan and Co. pp. 146–147. OCLC 8544105.
- Saint-Simon (1899). Boislisle, Arthur de (ed.). Mémoires du duc de Saint-Simon [Memoirs of the Duke of Saint-Simon] (in French). Vol. Tome quatorzième. Paris: Hachette. OCLC 1068033585. – 1706 to 1707
- Saint-Simon (1902). Boislisle, Arthur de (ed.). Mémoires du duc de Saint-Simon [Memoirs of the Duke of Saint-Simon] (in French). Vol. Tome seizième. Paris: Hachette. OCLC 1068033585. – 1708
- Wheatley, Henry Benjamin (1912). "Anthony Hamilton's Mémoires de la Vie du Comte de Gramont". In Ward, Adolphus William; Waller, Alfred Rayney (eds.). The Cambridge History of English Literature. Vol. VIII. Cambridge: Cambridge University Press. pp. 261–264. OCLC 5186868.

Attribution:
