= Principality of Bidache =

Feudal state in France from 1570 to 1793

Coordinates: 43.4870°N 1.1381°W

Principality of Bidache Principauté de Bidache (French) Bidaxuneko Printzerria (Basque)
- 1570–1793
- Coat of arms

- Bidache shown on a map of the modern department of Pyrénées-Atlantiques
- Capital: Bidache
- Common languages: French; Occitan and anciently Basque
- Religion: Roman Catholicism
- Government: Monarchy
- Prince
  - 1570–1576: Antoine I
  - 1576–1644: Antoine II
  - 1644–1678: Antoine III, Marshal of France
  - 1678–1720: Antoine IV, Viceroy of Navarre
  - 1720-1725: Antoine V, Marshal of France
  - 1725-1741: Antoine VI
  - 1741-1745: Louis de Gramont, 6th Duke of Gramont
  - 1745-1801: Antoine VII (in pretense after 1793)
  - 1801-1836: Antoine VIII (in pretense)
  - 1836-1855: Antoine IX (in pretense)
  - 1855-1880: Antoine Alfred Agénor, (in pretense)
- Historical era: Renaissance
  - Tribute last paid to king of Navarre: 1434
  - Established: 21 October 1570
  - Promulgation of Legal Code: 6 April 1575
  - Territory deemed a part of the French state by the King of France: 16 April 1790
  - Occupied by France: 1793
Preceded by	Succeeded by
Kingdom of Navarre	Republic of France
- Today part of: France

The Principality of Bidache was from 1570 to 1793 a small feudal state in the south west of modern-day France. The sovereignty of Bidache was proclaimed by Count Antoine de Gramont in 1570. The counts of Gramont had formerly been vassals of the King of Navarre however they had last paid tribute in 1434 and considered themselves relieved of their fealty. The principality maintained de jure sovereignty until 1790 when by royal edict the territory of the principality was declared to be a part of France by Louis XVI. In 1793 the principality was occupied by troops loyal to the French First Republic and the last reigning prince, Antoine VII, was ousted. The royal and noble Gramont dynasty survives to the present day.

== History ==
The date for the establishment of sovereignty in Bidache is 21 October 1570. On that day, Antoine I de Gramont in his capacity as mayor of Bayonne stated that the sovereignty of Bidache was held by him. This was the first public statement by the Counts of Gramont claiming sovereignty over Bidache. However, a bequest written in private between Antoine and his wife in 1566 referred to his "sovereignty" over Bidache. By the end of 1570, several acts claiming sovereign rights in Bidache appeared in quick succession. On 13 November of that same year, Antoine I enforced his rights over the inhabitants of Bidache as their sovereign lord. This was followed by Antoine formulated a formal legal code in 1575.

His successor, Antoine II, used the title of Majesty "for such is our pleasure" in an order issued on 22 September 1596. From this date, he calls his actions "sovereign". External recognition is found in letters patent issued by Henri IV of France and Navarre which refer to Antoine II de Gramont as "ruler of the land of Bidache" and exempted from the Edict of Nantes.

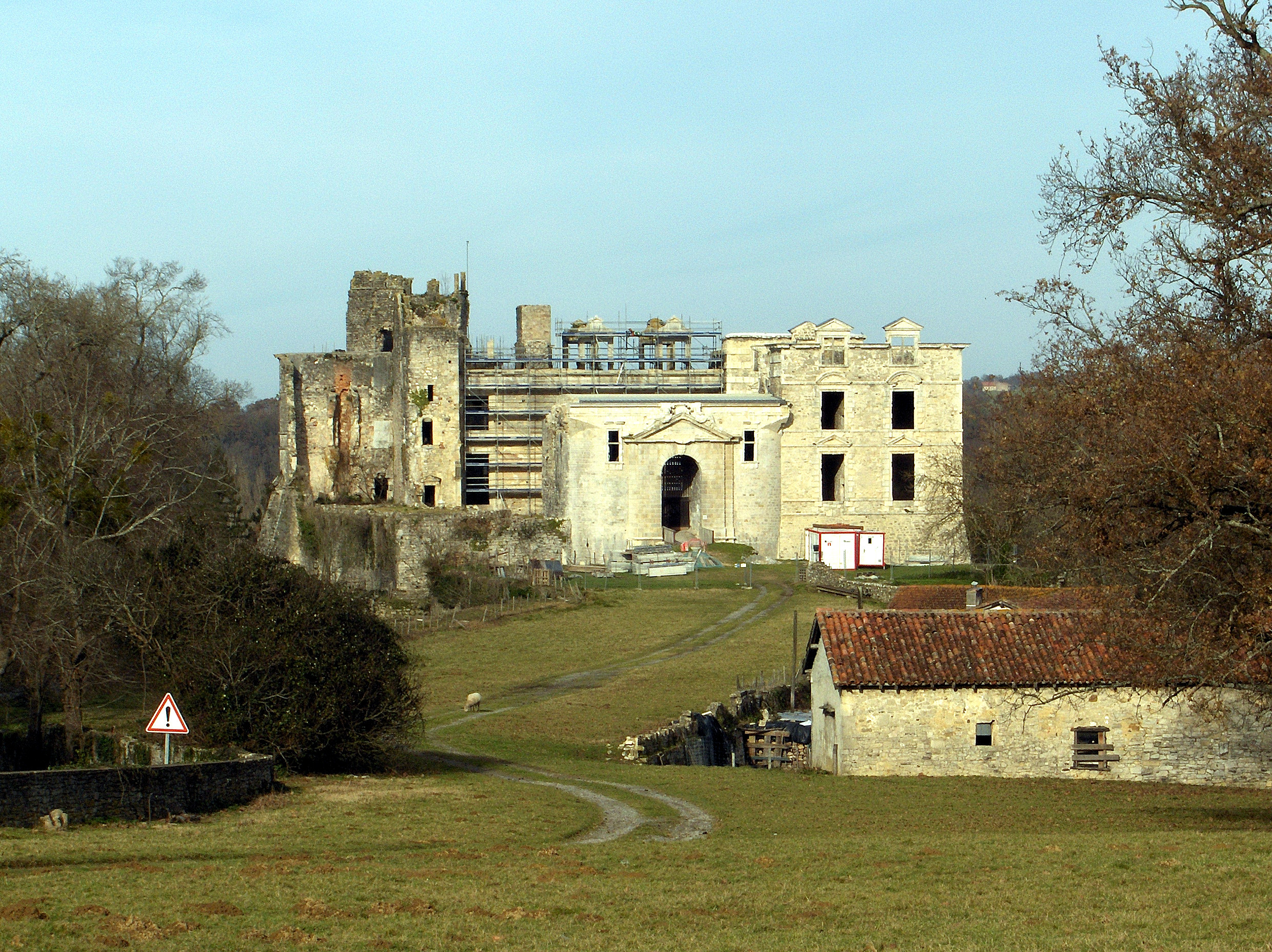
Château de Bidache

In 1631 Cardinal Richelieu is recorded as having complained that Bidache was a "haven of thieves" and "Judaized" and recommended sending a commissioner to the principality. The evidence that Bidache had become an asylum benefiting those who wanted to escape the kingdoms of France and Navarre indicated the practical implications of Bidache sovereignty.

The de jure end of sovereignty came during the upheaval of the French Revolution. In January 1790 attempts were made to secure the continued existence of the principality separate from the French crown, but these came to no avail. An envoy, Louis Perret, was despatched to Paris, but he did not arrive before letters patent had been issued in the name of King Louis XVI that decreed Bidache to be a part of the new Basses-Pyrénées département. In 1793 troops loyal to the new French Republic occupied Bidache and ousted the last prince, Antoine VII. With de jure independence at an end the château was briefly converted into a hospital before being burned down in 1796. The ruins are currently being restored.

== See also ==
- Bidache
- Gramont
- Kingdom of Navarre
