= Antoine I de Gramont =

French general (1526–1576)

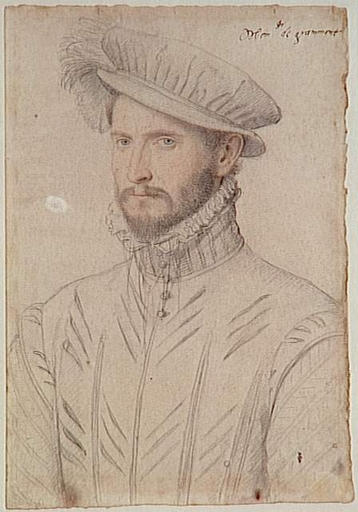
- Born: 1526
- Died: 8 December 1576 (aged 49–50); Bidache
- Allegiance: Kingdom of France
- Rank: Commander of the "régiment colonel" in the Protestant Army in Guyenne
- Commands: Lieutenant-General to the Queen of Navarre
- Battles / wars: 1st French War of Religion (Siege of Calais)
- Awards: Knight of the Order of Saint Michael
- Spouse(s): Hélène de Clermont
- Children: Philibert I de Gramont Théophile de Gramont Jean Antoine de Gramont Marguerite de Gramont Claire-Suzanne de Gramont

Antoine I d'Aure de Gramont, viscount of Aure, count of Guiche, sovereign-lord of Bidache (1526 – 8 December 1576) was a French courtier and general. He served as gentleman in ordinary to the king's chamber from 1559 to 1564, serving Henry II, Francis II and Charles IX in that role.

== Life ==
Antoine was the son of Menaud d'Aure d'Aster (c. 1485–1534) and Claire de Gramont (c. 1500 – c. 1527), daughter and heir of François de Gramont and Catherine d'Andouins. Menaud was himself son of Jean d'Aure and Jeanne-Isabeau de Foix-Grailly. Menaud and Claire's marriage contract, signed at Bidache on 23 November 1525, specified that any children born of the marriage should bear the name of Gramont. Antoine's first post came in 1538 as mayor and captain of Bayonne, followed by counsellor of state and captain of gendarmes in 1549.

Antoine distinguished himself at the capture of Calais in 1558 and the conquest of the Boulonnais and was made a knight of the Order of Saint Michael. He was in great favour at prince de Condé's court, linked to the prince as he was through his wife. Antoine became a Protestant in order to serve at the court of Jeanne d'Albret, Queen of Navarre, becoming one of the main leaders of the Protestant faction in what is now south-west France.

Antoine became the queen's lieutenant-general in Navarre and Béarn on 22 March 1563, with his estates of Gramont and Guiche promoted to counties in December that year. He tried to introduce Calvinism to Basse-Navarre and established preachers at Saint-Palais.

Antoine also commanded the 6,000-strong Protestant "régiment colonel" in Guyenne, "all old soldiers from Gascony, as good as any other" according to Brantôme. It was divided into three corps of 2,000 men each, with the lords of Montamat, La Lande and Bahus as their mestres de camp, most notably Bernard d'Astarac, baron of Montamat, who was made a lieutenant-general by the queen of Navarre at the same time as Bernard, baron of Arros. During the First French War of Religion Antoine took part in the pillaging of Poitiers and Angoulême, the capture of Orléans and Bourges, the blockade of Paris and the Battle of Dreux. His regiment was disbanded on 19 March 1563 to comply with the declarations of the Peace of Amboise.

Charles IX sent an army against Béarn under Antoine de Lomagne, baron of Terride in 1569, during which Antoine de Gramont retired to Bidache since he was unable to resist it. After the count of Montgomery's capture of Orthez, Antoine de Gramont met him but was unable to come to an agreement regarding the lieutenant-generalcy of Navarre and so retired to his château. He was present at Henry of Navarre's marriage to Marguerite de Valois in Paris and Charles IX put him under his protection, thus saving him from the St. Bartholomew's Day massacre. He renounced Protestantism and remained a Catholic until his death.

Antoine entered the service of the King of France in October 1572 and was made governor of Navarre and Béarn, contrary to the wishes of the King of Navarre. On 17 April 1573 he and his son Philibert were captured by the Protestant forces whilst on their way to Dax to parley with the Protestant captain Bernard d'Arros. This perturbed the Duke of Anjou and Charles IX, with Charles demanding that those responsible be punished. As the situation developed, Gramont communicated directly with the Duke of Anjou, insisting in his letters that he had remained loyal. During the following troubles which followed he played a rather reduced role, as described by his contemporary Nicolas de Bordenave (c. 1530–1601), historian of the House of Navarre. He was granted the title of Prince of Bidache in 1570.

== Marriage and issue ==
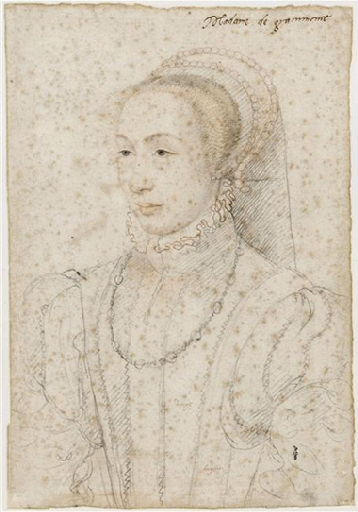
School of Jean Clouet, Portrait of Hélène de Clermont

By a marriage contract dated 29 September 1549, Antoine was married to Hélène de Clermont, daughter of François de Clermont, Lord of Traves and his wife Anne Gouffier, daughter of Artus Gouffier de Boisy. In 1530 she had become a lady-in-waiting to Eleanor of Habsburg. The couple had:

- Philibert I de Gramont (1552 – 11 July 1580), count of Guiche, viscount of Aster, baron of Gramont, sovereign-lord of Bidache; on 7 August 1567 married Diane d'Andouins (1554-1621), nicknamed Corisande; he was later made seneschal of Béarn.
- Théophile de Gramont (†1597), married Charlotte de Clermont.
- Jean Antoine de Gramont.
- Marguerite de Gramont; married Jean de Durfort (died February 1587), viscount of Duras, son of Symphorien de Duras.
- Claire-Suzanne de Gramont; in March 1595 married Henri des Prez (or des Prés) (died 1619).

== Bibliography (in French) ==
- A. Communay, Les Gascons dans les armées françaises, p. 493-494, Revue de l'Agenais, 1894, volume 21
- Le Roux, Nicolas (2001). La faveur du roi : mignons et courtisans au temps des derniers Valois (in French). Champ Vallon. ISBN 978-2-87673-311-4.
- Jean Baptiste Pierre Jullien de Courcelles, Histoire généalogique et héraldique des pairs de France, volume 7, p. 80-86, Paris, 1826
- SSLAP - Société des Sciences, Lettres et Arts de Pau: Bulletin de la Société des Sciences, Lettres et Arts de Pau, Extraits des registres du Conseil Souverain de Pau, du Parlement de Navarre, et de la Chambre des Comptes de Pau XVIe et XVIIe siècles (suite et fin), publiés et annotés par M. A. de Defau de Maluquer., 2nd series, volume 35, Pau 1907, p. 1-209
- Vignail, Marie-Catherine (2000). Le Traité de Vervins (in French). Presses de l'Universite Paris-Sorbonne. ISBN 2-84050-140-6.
