= Armand de Gramont, Comte de Guiche =

French noble playboy (1637–1673)

Armand de Gramont
- Count of Guiche
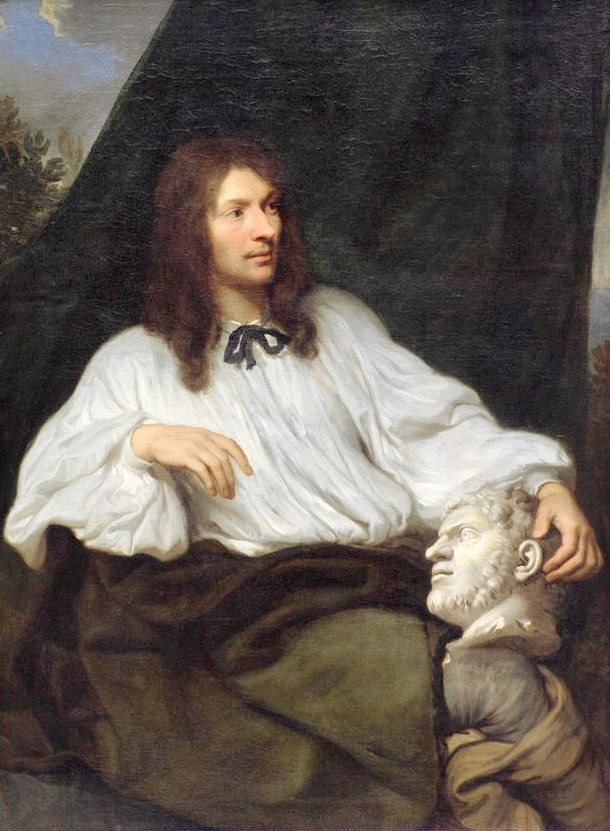
- Full name: Guy Armand de Gramont
- Born: 25 November 1637
- Died: 29 November 1673 (aged 36)
- Spouse: Marguerite-Louise-Suzanne de Béthune
- Father: Antoine de Gramont
- Mother: Françoise Marguerite du Plessis

Guy Armand de Gramont, Count of Guiche (25 November 1637 – 29 November 1673), was a French nobleman, adventurer and one of the greatest playboys of the 17th century.

== Early life ==
He was the son of Marshal Duke Antoine III de Gramont and Françoise-Marguerite du Plessis de Chivré, Richelieu's niece. His sister was Catherine Charlotte, (1639–1678), Princess of Monaco and one time mistress of Louis XIV.

== Career ==
After he was exiled in 1662, he fought against the Turks for Poland and against the English for the Dutch, and eventually returned to France in 1669.

He returned to court in 1671. In 1672, he joined Louis XIV and the Great Condé in the Franco-Dutch War and covered himself in glory when he swam across the Rhine, and the whole army followed his example.

== Personal life ==
Armand was bisexual. He was part of the entourage of Philippe de France, who was homosexual, where many reckoned him the handsomest man at court. He was known for being vain, overbearing, and somewhat contemptuous, but many lovers of both sexes often overlooked these flaws. It is generally accepted that he became the lover of Princess Henrietta, Philippe's wife, but for a time he also paid court to Louise de La Vallière. Guiche was, however, not sufficiently enamored with Louise to challenge King Louis XIV's affections for her. He was exiled in 1662 for conspiring with the jealous Henrietta to drive a wedge between Louis XIV and Louise.

He died on November 29, 1673.

== Portrayals in literature ==
The Comte de Guiche appears in Alexandre Dumas's novels Twenty Years After and The Vicomte de Bragelonne, where he is portrayed as the closest friend of Raoul, son of the musketeer Athos. In the latter novel, he is included in the entourage of Prince Philippe, and takes a central part in the tangled web of romantic intrigues which engulf the court.

== See also ==
- Gramont

Ancestors of Armand de Gramont, Comte de Guiche

16. Antoine de Gramont, Count of Guiche
8. Philibert de Gramont, Count of Guiche
17. Hélène de Clermont
4. Antoine, Duke de Gramont
18. Paul d'Andoins, Baron of Andoins, Count of Louvigny
9. Diane d'Andoins
19. Anne Marguerite de Cauna
2. Antoine, Duke de Gramont
20. Géraud de Roquelaure, Lord of Roquelaure
10. Antoine de Roquelaure
21. Catherine de Bezolles
5. Louise de Roquelaure
22. Jacques Claude d'Ornesan, Lord of Auradé
11. Catherine d'Ornesan
23. Brunette de Cornil, Dame de Moulin d'Armac
1. Armand de Gramont, Count of Guiche
24. Jacques de Chivré, seigneur du Plessis
12. François de Chivré, seigneur du Plessis
25. Jeanne Le Hesnault, Dame de Bouillé
6. Hector de Chivré, seigneur du Plessis
26. François de la Porte, Lord of Boissier
13. Léonore de la Porte
27. Madeleine Charles
3. Françoise Marguerite du Plessis de Chivré
28. François de Connan, Lord of Coulon and Rabastan
14. Nicolas de Connan, Lord of Rabastan
29. Jeanne Hennequin du Perray
7. Marie de Connan
30. Charles d'O, Lord of Vérigny
15. Anne d'O
31. Jacqueline Girard
