= Sendets, Pyrénées-Atlantiques =

Sendets
- Commune
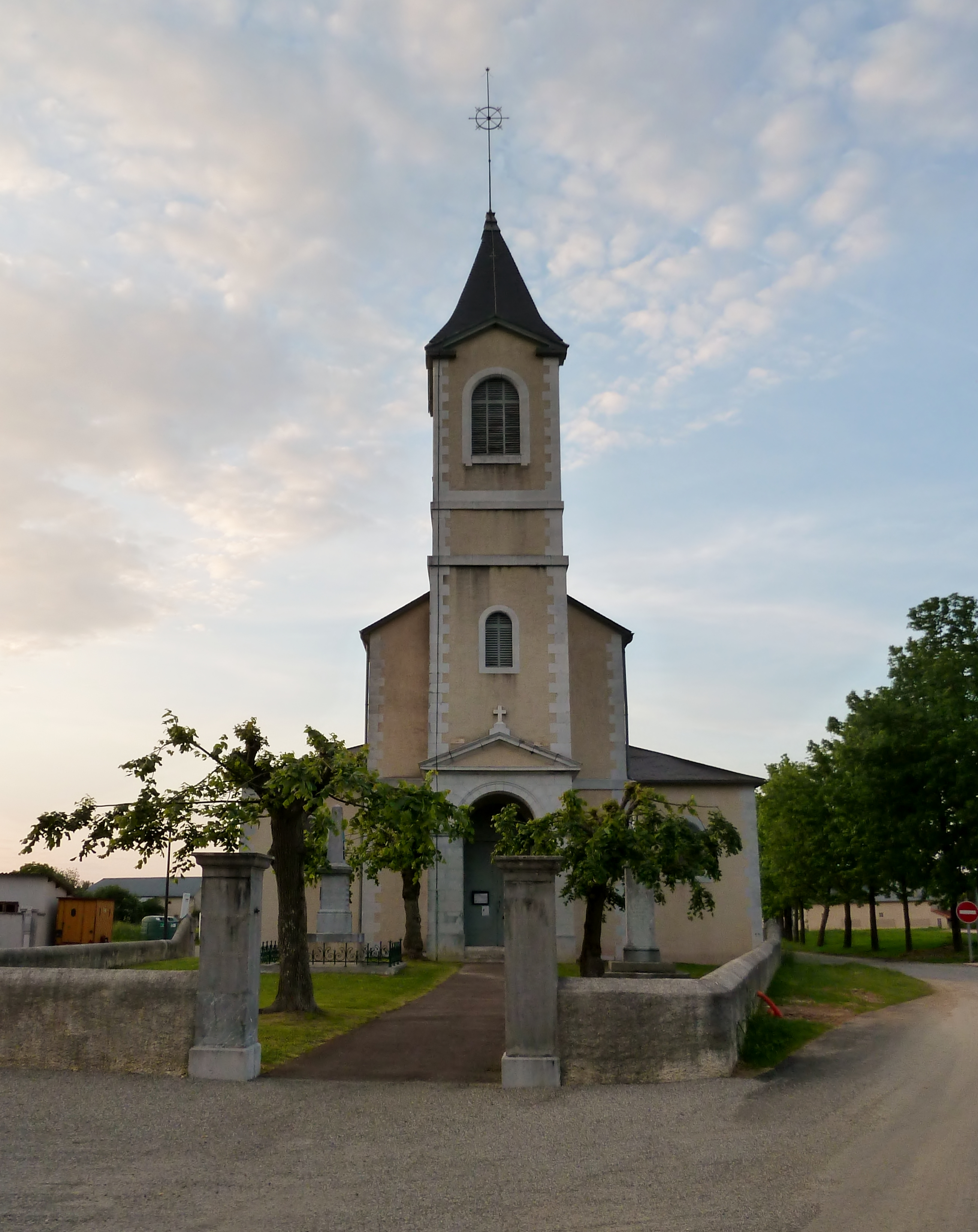
- The church of Sendets
- Location of Sendets
- Location within France Location within Nouvelle-Aquitaine
- Coordinates: 43°18′02″N 0°15′32″W
- Country: France
- Region: Nouvelle-Aquitaine
- Department: Pyrénées-Atlantiques
- Arrondissement: Pau
- Canton: Pays de Morlaàs et du Montanérès
- Intercommunality: CA Pau Béarn Pyrénées

Government
  - Mayor (2020–2026): Jean-Marc Pédebéarn
- Area^{1}: 7.73 km^{2} (2.98 sq mi)
- Highest elevation: 266 m (873 ft)
- Lowest elevation: 235 m (771 ft)
- Population (2023): 1,167
  - Density: 151/km^{2} (391/sq mi)
- Time zone: UTC+01:00 (CET)
  - Summer (DST): UTC+02:00 (CEST)
- INSEE/Postal code: 64518 /64320
- ^{1} French Land Register data, which excludes lakes, ponds, glaciers > 1 km^{2} (0.386 sq mi or 247 acres) and river estuaries.

Sendets (French pronunciation: [sɛ̃dɛts]; Occitan: Sendèts) is a commune in the Pyrénées-Atlantiques department in south-western France. In 1973, it was merged into the commune Idron-Lée-Ousse-Sendets (renamed Idron-Ousse-Sendets after Lée left the commune in 1989) with three other communes: Lée, Ousse and Idron. In 2000 the commune of Sendets was recreated.

== See also ==
- Communes of the Pyrénées-Atlantiques department
