= Artigueloutan =

- Commune
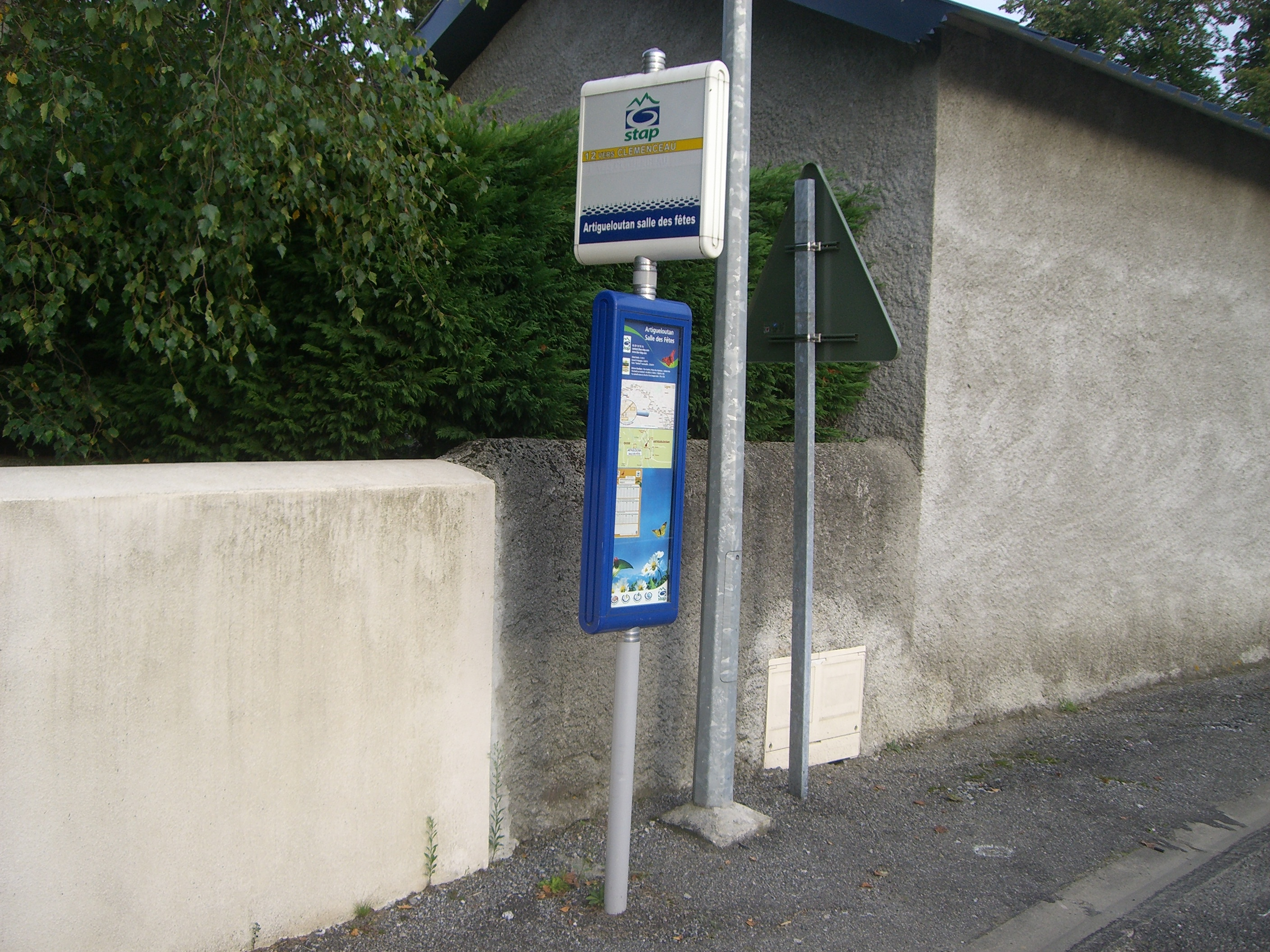
- Terminus of Buis route 12 at the Community Hall
- Location of Artigueloutan
- Location within France Location within Nouvelle-Aquitaine
- Coordinates: 43°16′33″N 0°14′42″W
- Country: France
- Region: Nouvelle-Aquitaine
- Department: Pyrénées-Atlantiques
- Arrondissement: Pau
- Canton: Pays de Morlaàs et du Montanérès
- Intercommunality: CA Pau Béarn Pyrénées

Government
  - Mayor (2020–2026): Marie-Claire Né
- Area^{1}: 8.12 km^{2} (3.14 sq mi)
- Elevation: 251 m (823 ft)
- Highest elevation: 370 m (1,210 ft)
- Lowest elevation: 229 m (751 ft)
- Population (2023): 1,105
  - Density: 136/km^{2} (352/sq mi)
- Time zone: UTC+01:00 (CET)
  - Summer (DST): UTC+02:00 (CEST)
- INSEE/Postal code: 64059 /64420
- ^{1} French Land Register data, which excludes lakes, ponds, glaciers > 1 km^{2} (0.386 sq mi or 247 acres) and river estuaries.

Artigueloutan (French pronunciation: [aʁtiɡlutɑ̃]; Occitan: Artigalotan) is a commune in the Pyrénées-Atlantiques department in the Nouvelle-Aquitaine region of south-western France. It is part of the urban area (aire d'attraction des villes) of Pau.

== Geography ==
Artigueloutan is located some 11 km east by south-east of Pau and 9 km south of Morlaàs. Access to the commune is by the D817 from Pau in the west passing through the north of the commune and continuing to Soumoulou in the east. Access to the village is by the D215 road from Assat in the south-west passing through the village and continuing north to Andoins. The D213 comes from Ousse in the west passing through the village and continuing east to Nousty. The commune is entirely farmland.

The Idelis bus line has two stops in the commune: one on route P10 from Pau Auchan to Artigueloutan - Community Hall and the second is Demand responsive transport Flexis Zone Est.

The Ruisseau de l'Ousse passes through the centre of the commune from east to west and continues to join the Gave de Pau at Pau.

=== Places and Hamlets ===
- Artiguenave
- Belloc
- Bistarou
- Lou Bouey
- Casalet (two places)
- Cazenave
- Courège
- Courège (Mill)
- Fort de César
- Fréchou
- Haure
- Hourcade
- Humaraut
- Laclau
- Layus
- Lebon
- Les Mattots
- Miqueu
- Mounyoye
- Pont Long
- Poublan
- Rigabert
- Serresèque
- Tuquet

== Toponymy ==
The name Artigueloutan appears in the forms:

- Artigueloptaa (1385),
- Artigalopta, and Artigelobtaa (14th century, Census of Béarn),
- Arthigueloutan (1457, Notaries of Assat),
- Artigaloutaa (1536, Titles of Affiefdom),
- Artigalotaa (1675, Reformation of Béarn),
- Artiguelotaa on the Cassini Map 1750, and
- Artigue-Loutan (1801, Bulletin des lois).

Its name in béarnais is Artigalotan (according to the classical norm of Occitan). According to Michel Grosclaude the name comes from the Gascon artigalota, meaning "small cleared land", with the suffix -anam.

A farm at a place called Belloc was mentioned in the Topographic Dictionary of 1863.

Les Bordes, also called Viellelongue, was a hamlet in the commune in 1675, (Reformation of Béarn.

Lou Bouey is an old hamlet in Artigueloutan which has been mentioned with the spellings:

- Lo Boey (1457, Cartulary of Ossau f. 177), and
- Louboey (1863).

Paul Raymond indicated that there was a Lay Abbey at Lou Bouey, dependent on the Viscounts of Béarn.

Cambus, a farm in Artigueloutan, was also a fief which, in 1538, included the communes of Ousse and Rontignon, vassal of the Viscounts of Béarn.

Clerguet was a farm and a fief of the commune, vassal of the Viscounts of Béarn, mentioned in 1538.

The Fort de César was a Motte-and-bailey castle in Artigueloutan and Ousse, mentioned in 1863.

Rigabert is the name of a farm mentioned in the dictionary of 1863.

== History ==
Paul Raymond noted that in 1385, Artigueloutan had 28 fires and depended on the bailiwick of Pau.

== Administration ==
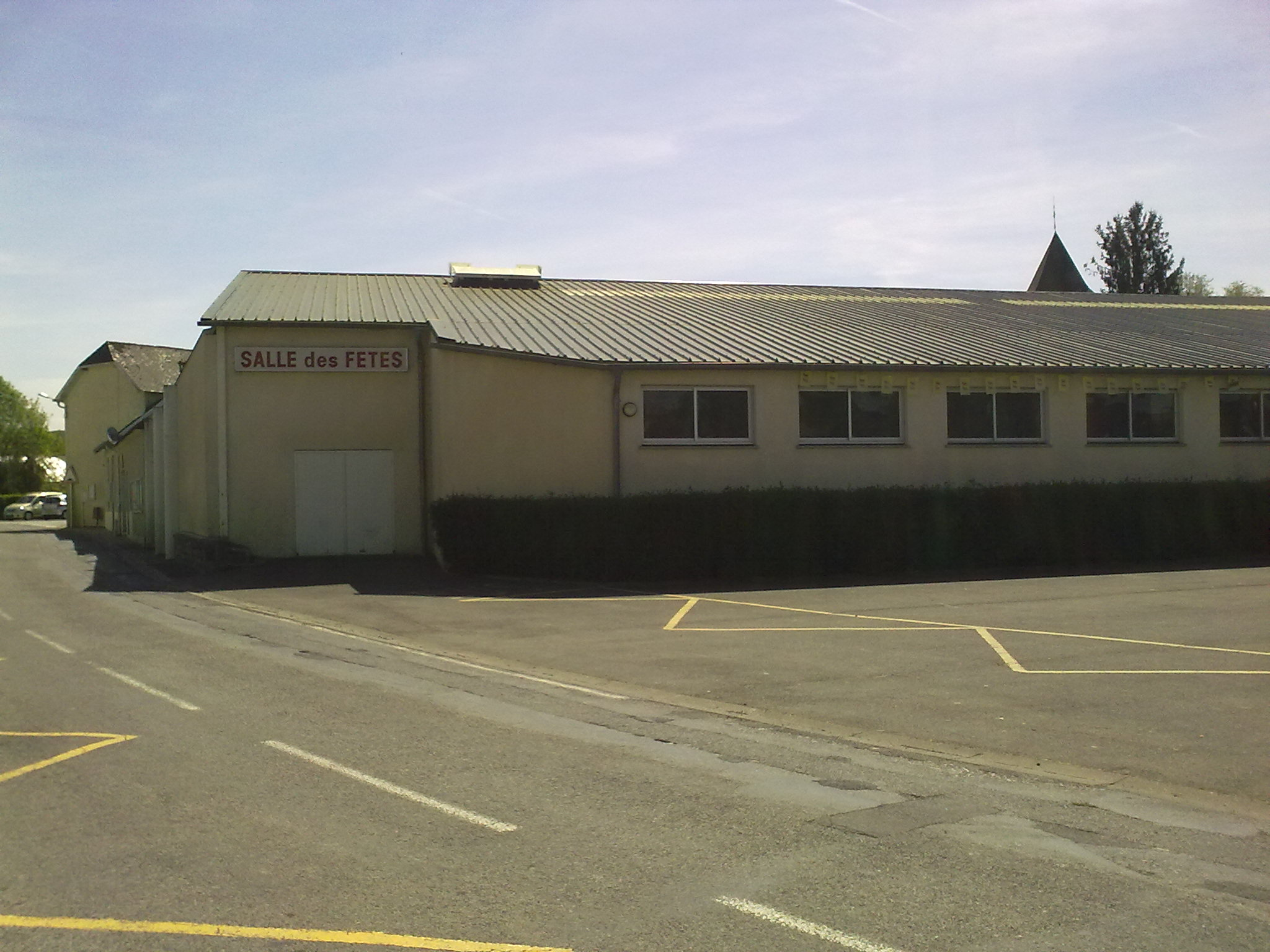
Artigueloutan Community Hall

List of Successive Mayors

From	To	Name
1995	2001	Hubert Lassègues
2001	2020	Michèle Laban-Winograd
2020	2026	Marie-Claire Né

=== Inter-communality ===
The commune is part of seven inter-communal structures:

- the Communauté d'agglomération Pau Béarn Pyrénées;
- the AEP association of the Ousse Valley;
- the association for the management of the Drainage basin of the Ousse;
- the Energy association of Pyrénées-Atlantiques;
- the inter-communal association for sanitation for the communes of the Ousse plain;
- the inter-communal association for the construction of a rescue centre at Soumoulou;
- the inter-communal association for the construction and operation of the CES at Bizanos.

== Demography ==
The inhabitants of the commune are known as Artigueloutanais or Artigueloutanaises in French.

Historical population

Year	Pop.	±% p.a.
1793	403	—
1800	454	+1.72%
1806	513	+2.06%
1821	518	+0.06%
1831	600	+1.48%
1836	610	+0.33%
1841	700	+2.79%
1846	664	−1.05%
1851	639	−0.76%
1856	717	+2.33%
1861	710	−0.20%
1866	718	+0.22%
1872	691	−0.64%
1876	672	−0.69%
1881	655	−0.51%
1886	646	−0.28%
1891	577	−2.23%
1896	527	−1.80%
1901	524	−0.11%

Year	Pop.	±% p.a.
1906	476	−1.90%
1911	503	+1.11%
1921	405	−2.14%
1926	429	+1.16%
1931	420	−0.42%
1936	401	−0.92%
1946	333	−1.84%
1954	348	+0.55%
1962	404	+1.88%
1968	435	+1.24%
1975	459	+0.77%
1982	534	+2.19%
1990	669	+2.86%
1999	722	+0.85%
2007	840	+1.91%
2012	999	+3.53%
2017	1,090	+1.76%
2023	1,105	+0.23%

Source: EHESS and INSEE

== Economy ==
The commune is partially part of the Appellation d'origine contrôlée (AOC) zone of Ossau-iraty

== Culture and heritage ==
=== Sites and monuments ===
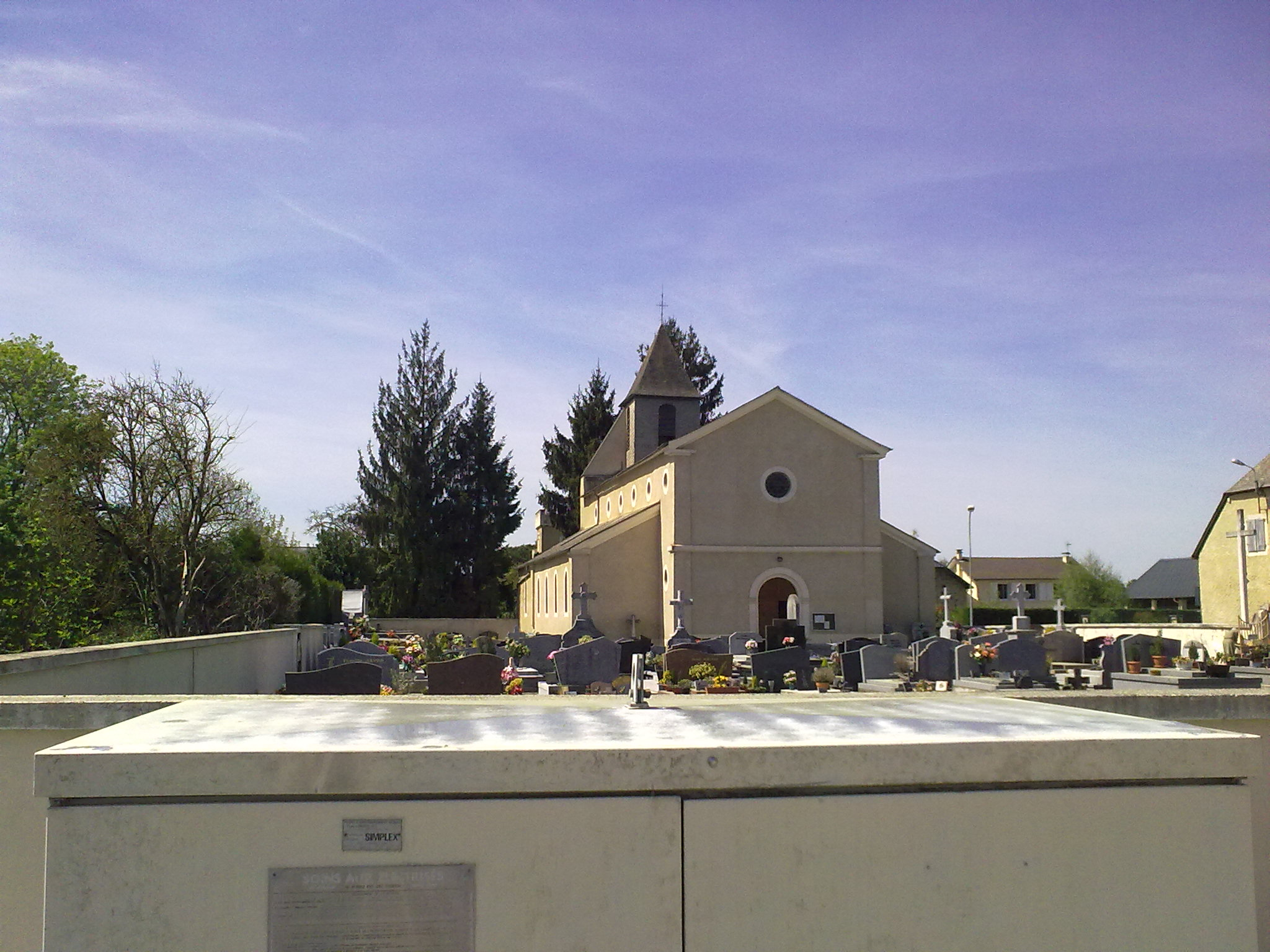
The Church

- The Church of Saint John the Baptist dates to the middle of the 19th century. It is registered as a historical monument.

=== Environmental heritage ===
The Chemin Henri-IV passes along the south-western border of the commune.

=== Education ===
Artigueloutan has a primary school.

== See also ==
- Communes of the Pyrénées-Atlantiques department
