= Antoine de Gramont, 2nd Duke of Gramont =

French military commander

Antoine de Gramont
- 2nd Duke of Gramont
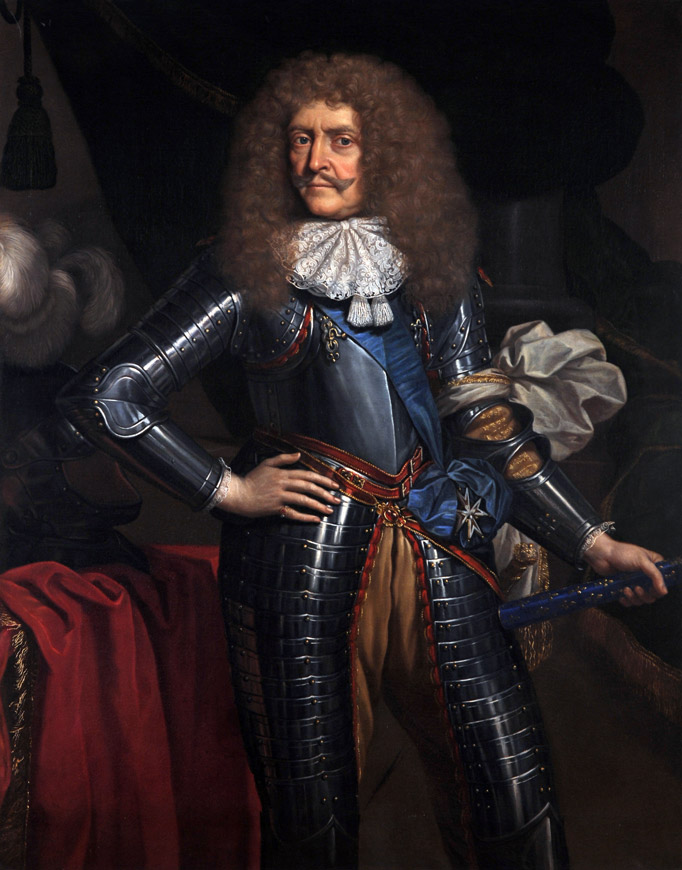
- Antoine, Duke of Gramont
- Born: 1604; Chateau d'Hagetmau
- Died: 12 July 1678 (aged 73–74); Bayonne
- Noble family: Gramont
- Spouse: Françoise Marguerite du Plessis
- Issue: Guy Armand, Count of Guiche; Catherine Charlotte, Princess of Monaco; Antoine Charles, 3rd Duke of Gramont; Henriette Catherine, Marquise of Raffetot
- Father: Antoine II de Gramont
- Mother: Louise de Roquelaure

Antoine de Gramont, 2nd Duke of Gramont, comte de Guiche, comte de Gramont, comte de Louvigny, Souverain de Bidache (Antoine Agénor; 1604 – 12 July 1678) was a French military commander and diplomat. He served as Marshal of France from 1641, Viceroy of Navarre and Béarn, and Governor of Bayonne.

== Life and career ==
Antoine de Gramont came from an old southern French noble family. His father was Antoine II de Gramont, and his mother was Louise de Roquelaure (d. 1610), daughter of Marshal Roquelaure (1544–1625). He had a younger half-brother, Philibert de Gramont, from their father's second marriage to Claude de Montmorency.

Gramont was a loyal supporter of Richelieu. It is said that he once toasted to Richelieu saying that the cardinal was more important to him than the king and the entire royal family.

Gramont took part in many battles of the Thirty Years War, was promoted to Marshal of France on 22 September 1641, and obtained the title of Duke of Gramont in 1648 for himself and his heirs. He became minister in 1653, ambassador to the Reichstag in Frankfurt am Main in 1657, and was sent to Spain in 1660 to ask the hand in marriage of Maria Theresa of Austria, Infanta of Spain for Louis XIV. He died in 1678.

His memoirs ("Mémoires du maréchal de Gramont", Paris 1716) were published by his son Antoine Charles IV de Gramont.

== In literature ==
As the Comte de Guiche, he is a major character in Edmond Rostand's 1897 play Cyrano de Bergerac, where he is depicted at first as vain, lustful, and opportunistic. He is infatuated with Roxane, the heroine of the play, and tries to arrange her marriage to the Vicomte de Valvert as a "front" in order that he (the Count) may become her secret lover. When Cyrano kills Valvert in a duel, De Guiche becomes more open in his desires and tries to arrange his own marriage to her. After he is thwarted by Cyrano long enough for her to be able to marry her sweetheart Christian de Neuvillette, he vengefully sends both Christian and Cyrano to do battle at the 1640 Siege of Arras, in which Christian is killed. At Arras, however, de Guiche shows gallantry toward Roxane and a willingness to sacrifice his life to protect her after she arrives at the battlements. In doing this, he wins Cyrano's respect, and later becomes one of his most loyal friends. He is last seen warning Roxane of a plot to kill Cyrano - a plot which succeeds.

== Family ==
His younger half-brother was Philibert, comte de Gramont (1621–1707), renowned for his memoirs describing the love affairs of the English court of Charles II, edited by Antoine Hamilton.

In 1634, he married Cardinal Richelieu's niece, Françoise Marguerite du Plessis (1608–1689). They had four children:

1. Guy Armand de Gramont, Count of Guiche, (1637 – 29 November 1673), lover of both Philippe I, Duke of Orléans and his wife Henrietta of England, Duchess of Orléans. Predeceased his father and is thus known to history by the subsidiary title of Count of Guiche.
2. Catherine Charlotte de Gramont (1639–1678), Princess of Monaco by marriage and mistress of Louis XIV.
3. Antoine Charles de Gramont, 3rd Duke of Gramont (1641–1720), Viceroy of Navarre; succeeded his father as Duke of Gramont etc.
4. Henriette Catherine de Gramont, married Alexandre de Canonville, Marquis of Raffetot.

== Royal origin ==
According to Count Philibert de Gramont, their father, Antoine II de Gramont, viceroy of Navarre, was assumed to be a bastard child of king Henry IV by Diane d'Andoins, knowns as "La Belle Corisande". This has been challenged by some modern historians.

== Literature ==
- W. H. Lewis: Assault on Olympus; the rise of the House of Gramont between 1604 and 1678. New York, Harcourt, Brace (1958)

French nobility
| Preceded by Antoine II | 2nd Duke of Gramont; 1648–1678 | Succeeded by Antoine IV |
