= Canton of Pau-2 =

Coordinates: 43.31°N 0.34°W

The canton of Pau-2 is an administrative division of the Pyrénées-Atlantiques department, southwestern France. It was created at the French canton reorganisation which came into effect in March 2015. Its seat is in Pau.

It consists of the following communes:

1. Idron
2. Pau (partly)
