= Idron =

- Commune
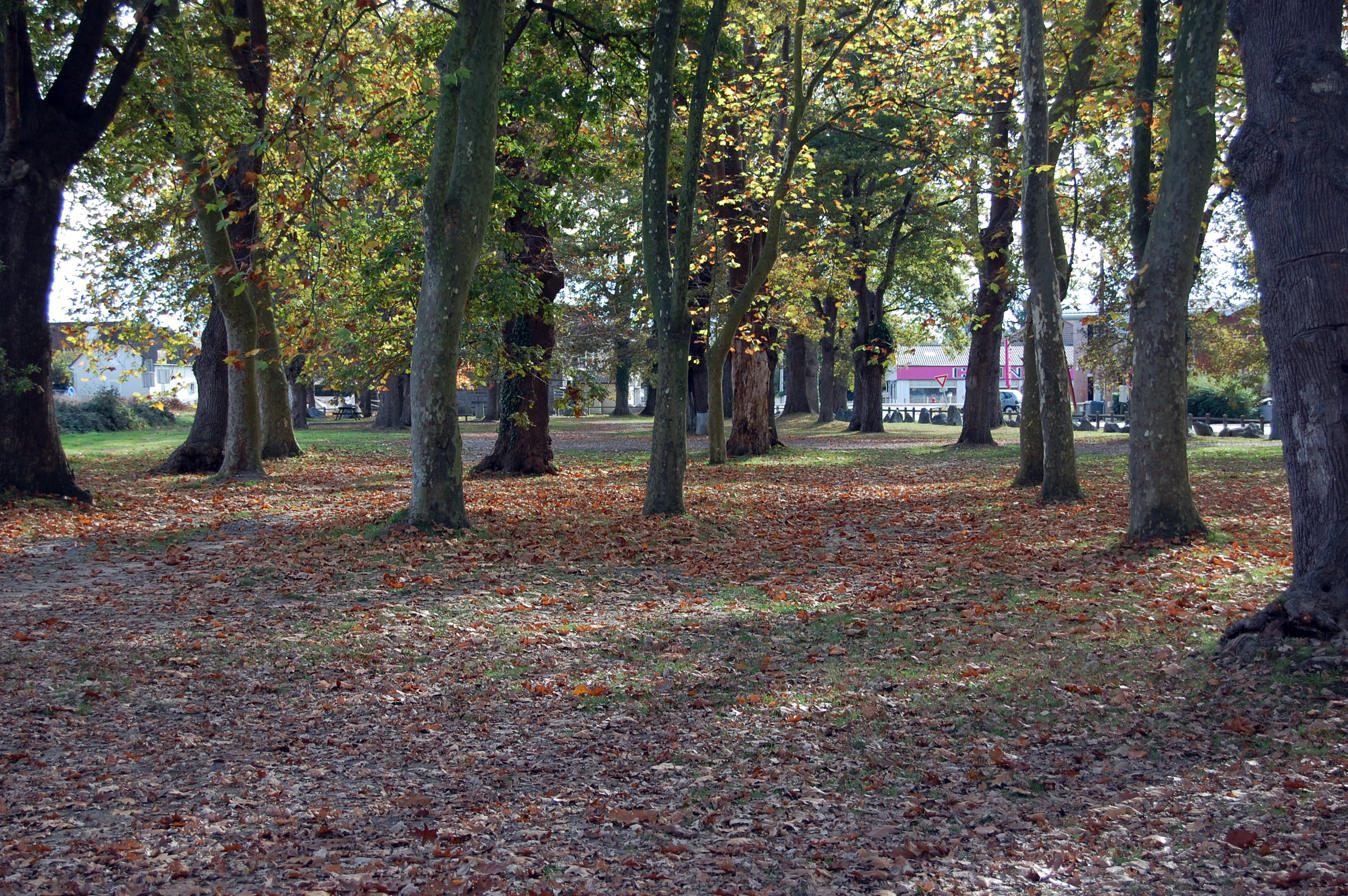
- The park in Idron
- Location of Idron
- Location within France Location within Nouvelle-Aquitaine
- Coordinates: 43°17′35″N 0°18′32″W
- Country: France
- Region: Nouvelle-Aquitaine
- Department: Pyrénées-Atlantiques
- Arrondissement: Pau
- Canton: Pau-2
- Intercommunality: Pau Béarn Pyrénées

Government
  - Mayor (2020–2026): André Nahon
- Area^{1}: 7.78 km^{2} (3.00 sq mi)
- Elevation: 200 m (660 ft)
- Highest elevation: 251 m (823 ft)
- Lowest elevation: 188 m (617 ft)
- Population (2023): 5,340
  - Density: 686/km^{2} (1,780/sq mi)
- Time zone: UTC+01:00 (CET)
  - Summer (DST): UTC+02:00 (CEST)
- INSEE/Postal code: 64269 /64320
- ^{1} French Land Register data, which excludes lakes, ponds, glaciers > 1 km^{2} (0.386 sq mi or 247 acres) and river estuaries.

Idron (French pronunciation: [idʁɔ̃]) is a commune in the Pyrénées-Atlantiques department in south-western France. It is an eastern suburb of Pau. In 1973, it was merged into the commune Idron-Lée-Ousse-Sendets (renamed Idron-Ousse-Sendets after Lée left the commune in 1989) with three other communes: Lée, Ousse and Sendets. In 2000 the commune of Idron was recreated.

== Population ==
Population data refer to the area corresponding with the commune as of January 2025.

Historical population
Year	Pop.	±% p.a.
1968	1,013	—
1975	1,274	+3.33%
1982	1,579	+3.11%
1990	2,311	+4.88%
1999	3,144	+3.48%
2007	3,733	+2.17%
2012	4,267	+2.71%
2017	4,846	+2.58%
2023	5,340	+1.63%
Source: INSEE

== See also ==
- Communes of the Pyrénées-Atlantiques department
