= Bartrès =

- Commune
- Coat of arms
- Location of Bartrès
- Location within France Location within Occitanie
- Coordinates: 43°07′28″N 0°02′47″W
- Country: France
- Region: Occitania
- Department: Hautes-Pyrénées
- Arrondissement: Argelès-Gazost
- Canton: Lourdes-1
- Intercommunality: CA Tarbes-Lourdes-Pyrénées

Government
  - Mayor (2020–2026): Gérard Clave
- Area^{1}: 7.31 km^{2} (2.82 sq mi)
- Elevation: 430 m (1,410 ft)
- Highest elevation: 575 m (1,886 ft)
- Lowest elevation: 439 m (1,440 ft)
- Population (2023): 485
  - Density: 66.3/km^{2} (172/sq mi)
- Time zone: UTC+01:00 (CET)
  - Summer (DST): UTC+02:00 (CEST)
- INSEE/Postal code: 65070 /65100
- ^{1} French Land Register data, which excludes lakes, ponds, glaciers > 1 km^{2} (0.386 sq mi or 247 acres) and river estuaries.

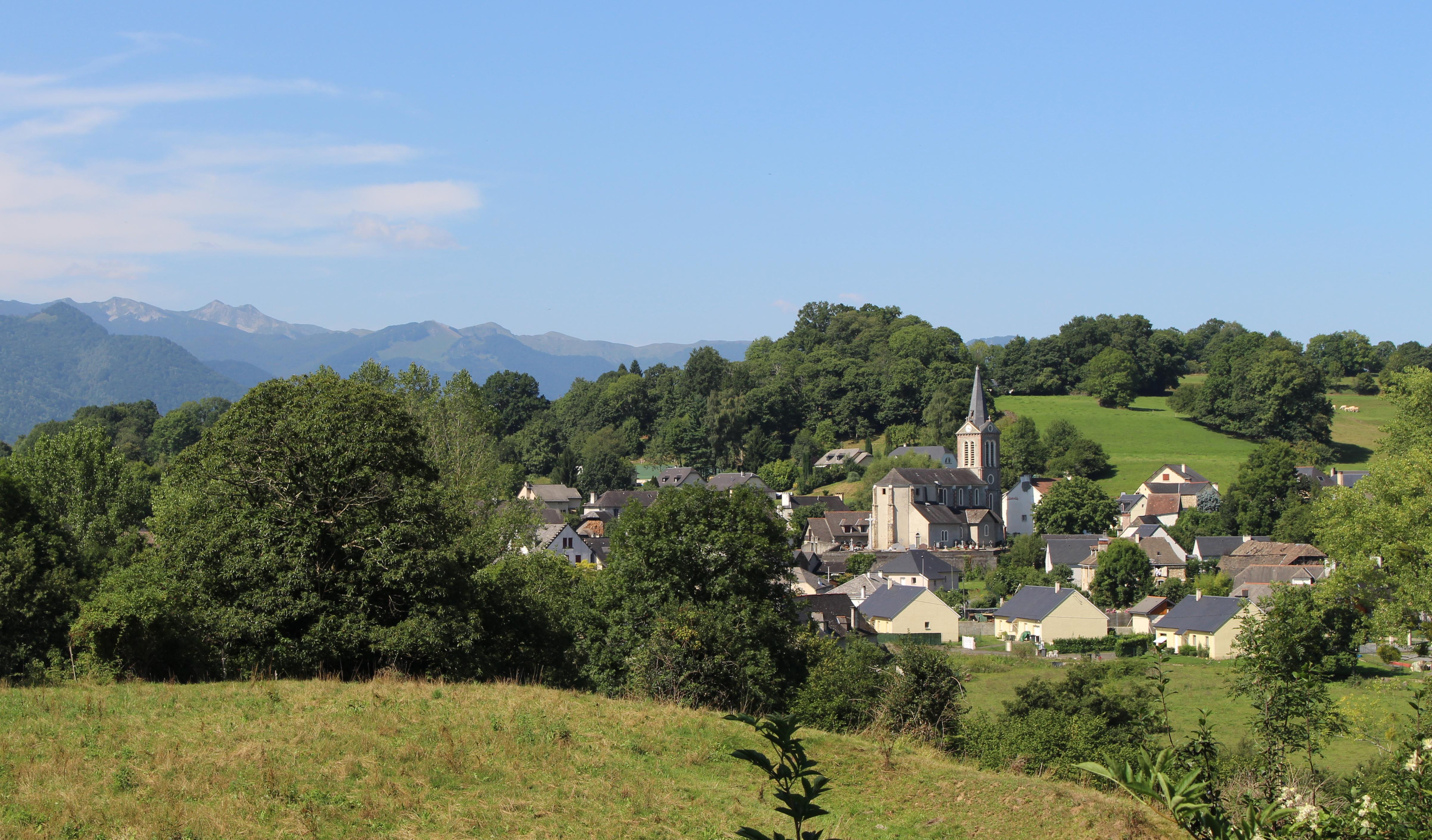
Bartrès

Bartrès (French pronunciation: [baʁtʁɛs]; Occitan: Bartrés) is a commune in the Hautes-Pyrénées department in southwestern France.

The village is famous for its association with St. Bernadette Soubirous. St. Bernadette was sent there in her infancy to a wet nurse, and again in her early teens to work for the same lady as a shepherdess. Today, the village is visited by numerous pilgrims who come to pray at the village church and venerate a relic of the saint.

== Population ==
Historical population
Year	Pop.	±% p.a.
1968	167	—
1975	197	+2.39%
1982	302	+6.29%
1990	349	+1.82%
1999	351	+0.06%
2007	462	+3.49%
2012	467	+0.22%
2017	514	+1.94%
2023	485	−0.96%
Source: INSEE

== See also ==
- Communes of the Hautes-Pyrénées department
