= Antoine de Gramont, 1st Duke of Gramont =

French military commander (1572–1644)

Antoine de Gramont
- 1st Duke of Gramont
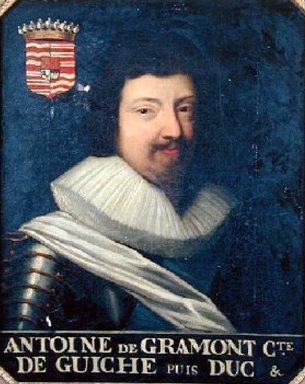
- Antoine II de Gramont
- Born: 1572
- Died: 1644 (aged 71–72)
- Noble family: Gramont
- Spouses: 1. Louise de Roquelaure; 2. Claude de Montmorency
- Issue Detail: Antoine, Philibert, & others
- Father: Philibert, Count of Guiche
- Mother: Diane d'Andoins

Antoine de Gramont, 1st Duke of Gramont (1572–1644) was a member of minor French nobility by birth. Created the 1st Duke of Gramont in 1643 by King Louis XIV, he was automatically a Peer. His granddaughter Catherine Charlotte de Gramont married Louis I, Prince of Monaco, making Antoine a direct ancestor of the present reigning Albert II of Monaco. Though created the 1st Duke of Gramont, the creation of the title was not officially registered in Parliament before his death, so his son had to petition for the dukedom to be recognised. His mother had been royal mistress of King Henri III of Navarre (the future Henri IV of France) between 1582 and 1591.

== First marriage ==
He married Louise de Roquelaure, daughter of Antoine de Roquelaure

Antoine and Louise had two sons:

1. Antoine (1604–1678), numbered Antoine III, who became the 2nd duc de Gramont
2. Roger (died 1629), who was known as comte de Louvigny

== Second marriage ==
In 1618, he married Claude de Montmorency of the House of Montmorency.

Antoine and Claude had two sons:

1. Henri (died 1679), Count of Toulongeon
2. Philibert (1621-1707), courtier

—and four daughters

1. Susanne-Charlotte (1627–1688), married Henri Mitte, Marquis of Saint-Chamond
2. Anne-Louise (died 1666), married Isaac de Pas, Marquis of Feuquière
3. Françoise-Marguerite, married Philippe, Marquis of Lons
4. Charlotte-Catherine (died 1714), became abbess of Notre-Dame-du-Ronceray at Angers.

== Arms ==
Arms of the 1st Duke of Gramont.

- Écartelé, au I et IV, de gueules à trois fasce ondées d'or; aux Iet III, cousu de gueules à trois jumelles d'argent; sur-le-tout, contre-écartelé : au 1, d'or, au lion d'azur, armé et lampassé de gueules (Gramont); au 2, de gueules, à trois flèches d'or, armées et empennées d'argent, 2 et 1, les pointes en bas (Asté); au 3, d'or, à un lévrier de gueules, colleté d'azur, à l'orle de sable, semée de besants d'or (Aure); au 4, d'argent à un chef endenté d'azur.
