= Lée =

- Commune
- Location of Lée
- Location within France Location within Nouvelle-Aquitaine
- Coordinates: 43°17′19″N 0°17′27″W
- Country: France
- Region: Nouvelle-Aquitaine
- Department: Pyrénées-Atlantiques
- Arrondissement: Pau
- Canton: Pays de Morlaàs et du Montanérès
- Intercommunality: CA Pau Béarn Pyrénées

Government
  - Mayor (2020–2026): Didier Rivière
- Area^{1}: 2.94 km^{2} (1.14 sq mi)
- Elevation: 235 m (771 ft)
- Highest elevation: 251 m (823 ft)
- Lowest elevation: 205 m (673 ft)
- Population (2023): 1,271
  - Density: 432/km^{2} (1,120/sq mi)
- Time zone: UTC+01:00 (CET)
  - Summer (DST): UTC+02:00 (CEST)
- INSEE/Postal code: 64329 /64320
- ^{1} French Land Register data, which excludes lakes, ponds, glaciers > 1 km^{2} (0.386 sq mi or 247 acres) and river estuaries.

Lée (French pronunciation: [le]) is a commune in the Pyrénées-Atlantiques department in south-western France. In 1973, it was merged into the commune Idron-Lée-Ousse-Sendets with three other communes: Idron, Ousse and Sendets. In 1989 the commune of Lée was recreated.

== See also ==
- Communes of the Pyrénées-Atlantiques department
