= Andoins =

- Commune
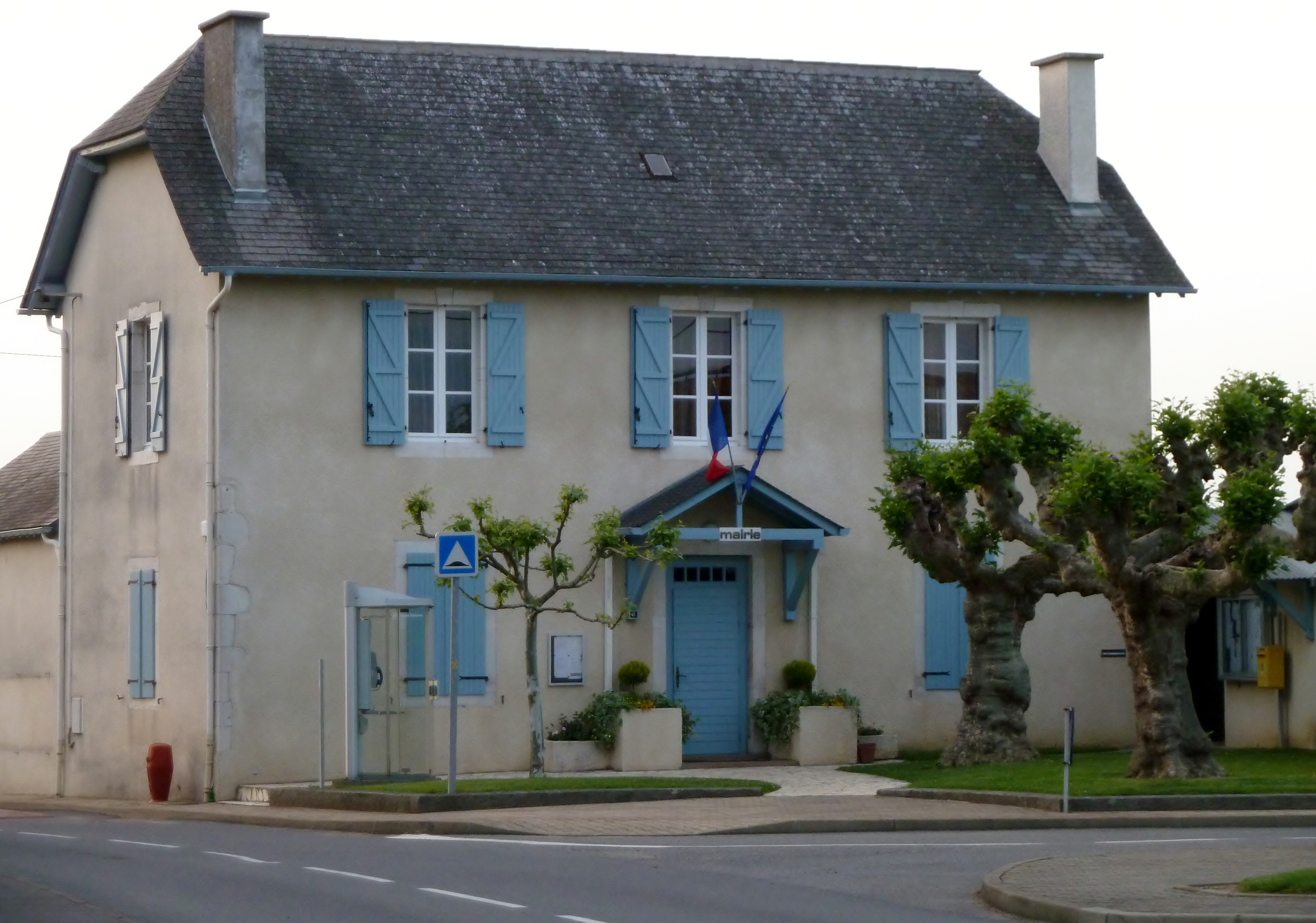
- Town hall

- Coat of arms
- Location of Andoins
- Location within France Location within Nouvelle-Aquitaine
- Coordinates: 43°18′20″N 0°13′39″W
- Country: France
- Region: Nouvelle-Aquitaine
- Department: Pyrénées-Atlantiques
- Arrondissement: Pau
- Canton: Pays de Morlaàs et du Montanérès
- Intercommunality: Nord-Est Béarn

Government
  - Mayor (2020–2026): Aude Lacaze-Labadie
- Area^{1}: 12.22 km^{2} (4.72 sq mi)
- Elevation: 342 m (1,122 ft)
- Highest elevation: 357 m (1,171 ft)
- Lowest elevation: 255 m (837 ft)
- Population (2023): 727
  - Density: 59.5/km^{2} (154/sq mi)
- Time zone: UTC+01:00 (CET)
  - Summer (DST): UTC+02:00 (CEST)
- INSEE/Postal code: 64021 /64420
- ^{1} French Land Register data, which excludes lakes, ponds, glaciers > 1 km^{2} (0.386 sq mi or 247 acres) and river estuaries.

Andoins is a commune in the Pyrénées-Atlantiques department in the Nouvelle-Aquitaine region of southwestern France.

== Geography ==
=== Location ===
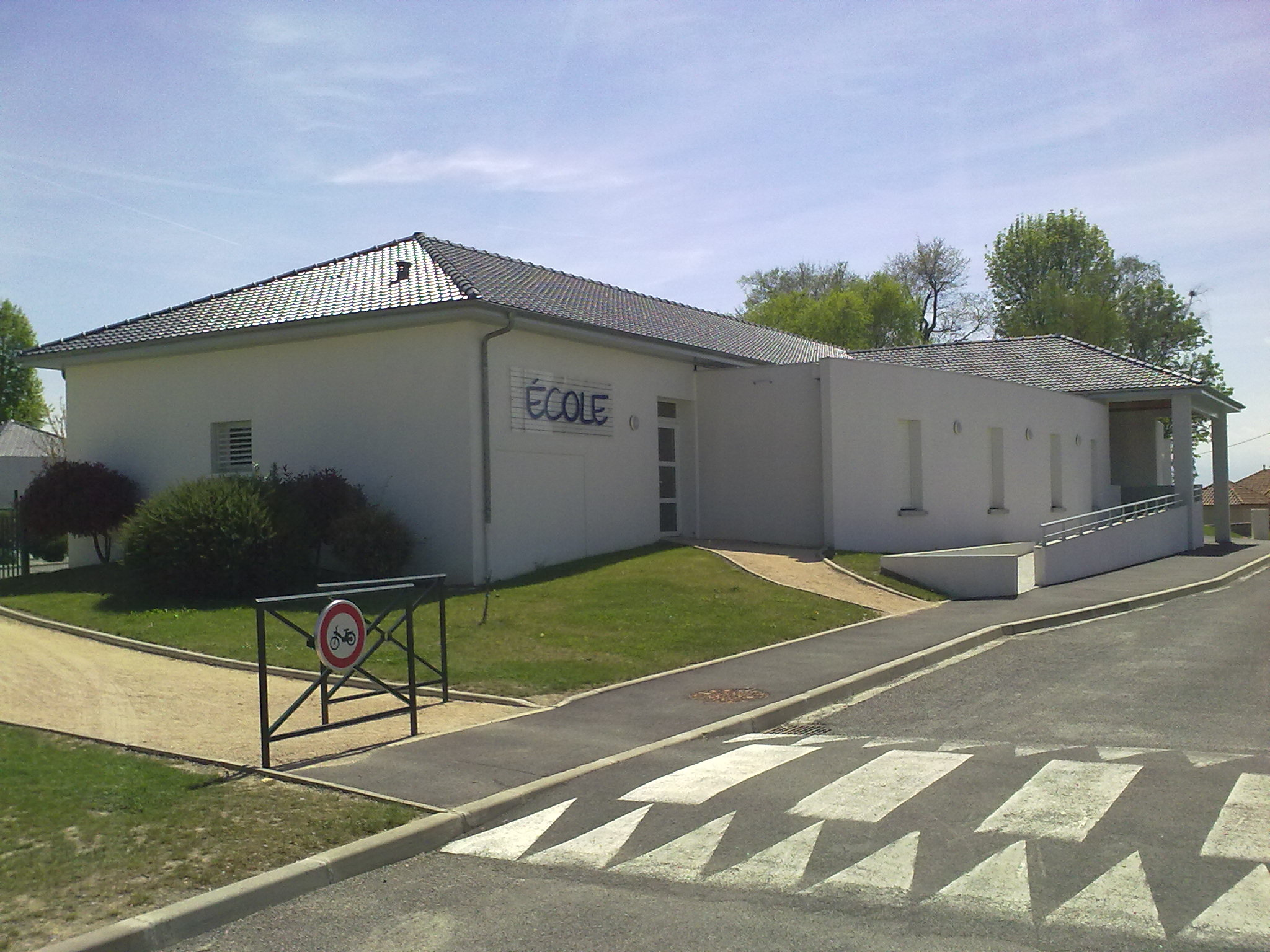
Andoins School.

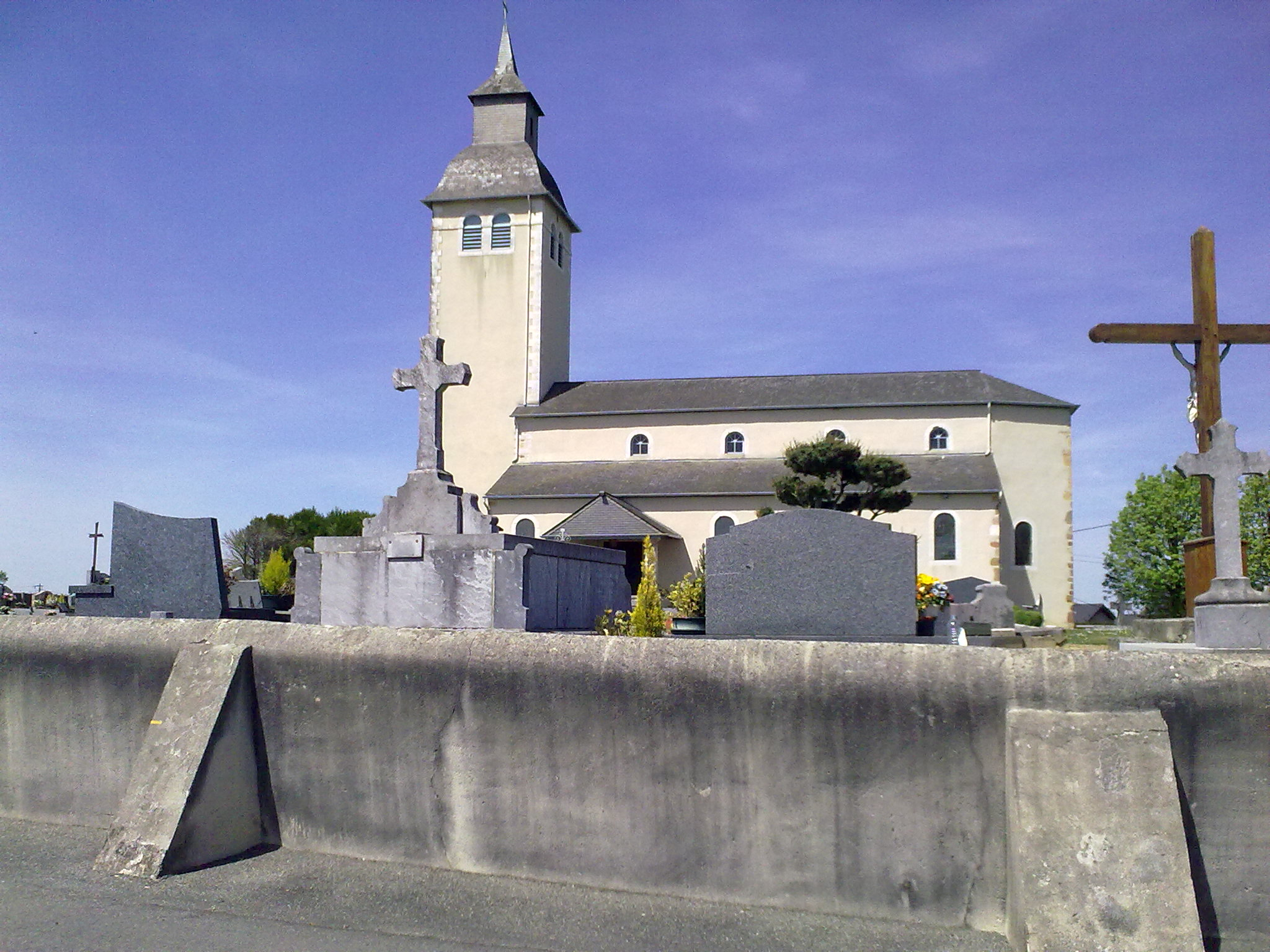
Saint-Laurent Church

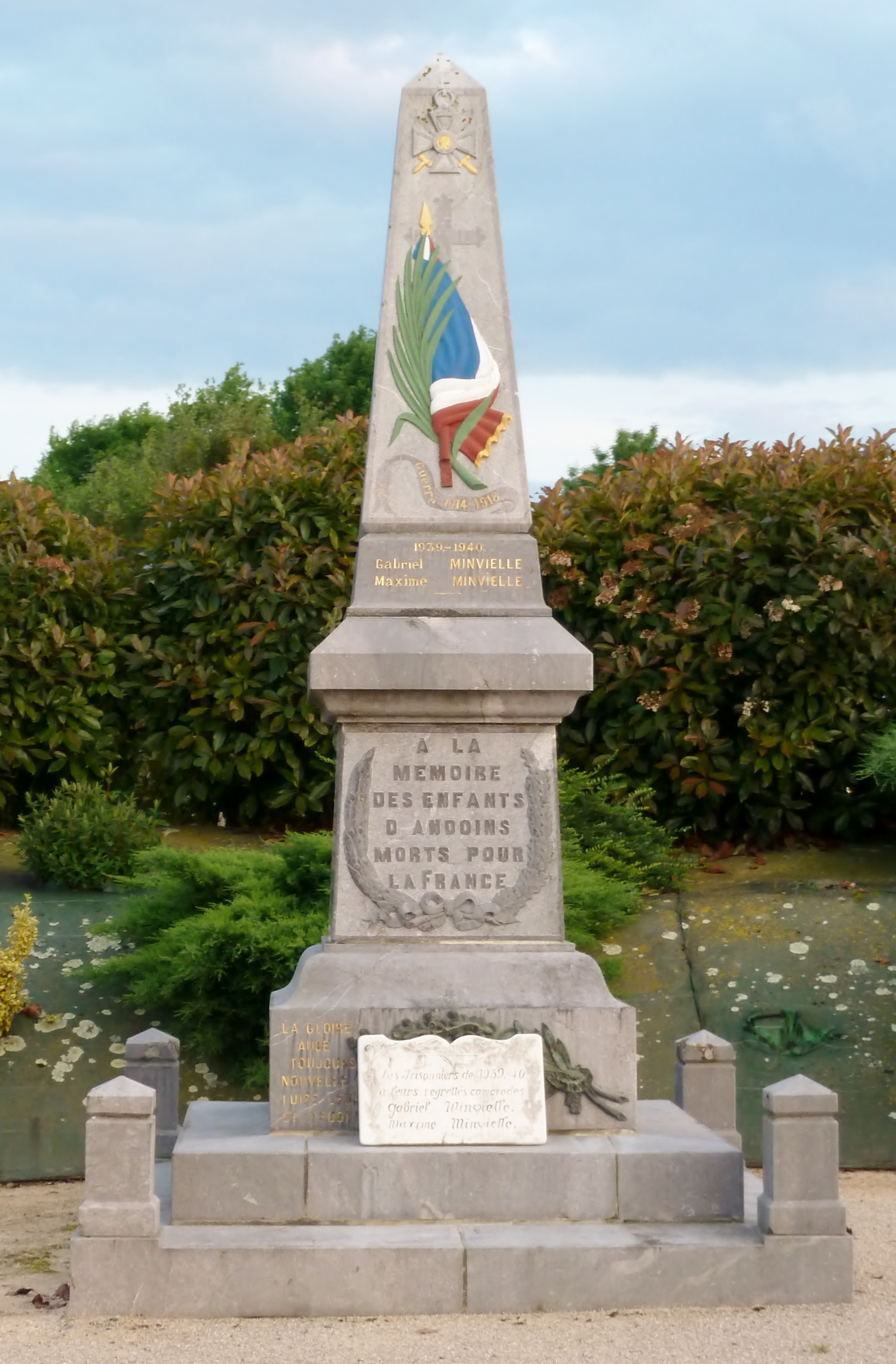
The War Memorial

The commune is part of the urban area of Pau and is located 5 km east of Pau (five miles), the commune is part of the Vic-Bilh region of Gascony.

=== Access ===
The commune is traversed by the A64 autoroute however there is no exit in the commune. The nearest exit is Exit 11 just south-east of the commune. Access to the village is by the D39 road from Morlaàs in the north-west which continues south-east to Limendous. There is also the D538 which goes north-west from the village to Serres-Morlaàs. There is also the D215 which goes south-west from the village to Artigueloutan.

=== Hydrography ===
Located in the drainage basin of the Adour, the commune is traversed from south-east to north-west by the Luy de France which forms part of the northern border before continuing to join the Lucet east of Morlaàs.

The Ayguelengue forms the southern border of the commune before joining the Oussere and continuing west.

=== Localities and hamlets ===
- Lous Augas
- Baradat
- Barrails
- Bégué
- Bordenave
- Capdepon
- Cazaux
- Cazenave
- Courriades
- Freitet
- Gabaix
- Las Grabes
- Hourcade
- Lapoutge
- Laulhé
- Grange Laulhé
- Lendrat
- Minvielle
- Grange Montané
- Pé-deu-Boscq
- Peyré
- Poublan
- Puyau
- Teulé
- Troubet
- Vergez

== Toponymy ==
The commune name in béarnais is Andonsh. (according to the classical norm of Occitan).

Brigitte Jobbé-Duval indicates that the village's name probably comes from the family name Antonius, modified in basque to Anton plus the suffix -tz inducing the property of or the domain of Anton.

The following table details the origins of the commune name and other names in the commune.

Name	Spelling	Date	Source	Page	Origin	Description
Andoins	Andongns	12th century	Raymond	5		Village
	Andongs	1101	Raymond	5	Cartulary of Morlaàs	
	Andons	12th century	Raymond	5	Lescar	
	Andoniœ	1270	Raymond	5	Pau	
	Andonhs	13th century	Raymond	5	Fors de Béarn	
	Andoyns	14th century	Raymond	5	Census	
Aus-Cités	Aus-Cités	1863	Raymond	17		Place
Freitet	Lo boscq et lane aperat lo Freytat	1457	Raymond	65	Ossau	Wood
Hourcade	La Forcade	1385	Raymond	79	Census	Farm
Marque-Debat	La Marque-Debat	1863	Raymond	108		Hamlet
Marque-Dehore	La Marque-Dehore	1863	Raymond	108		Hamlet
Pé-deu-Boscq	Pé-deu-Boscq	1863	Raymond	133		Farm

Sources:

- Raymond: Topographic Dictionary of the Department of Basses-Pyrenees, 1863, on the page numbers indicated in the table. (in French)

Origins:

- Lescar: Cartulary of Lescar
- Pau: Cartulary of the Château of Pau
- Fors de Béarn
- Census: Census of Béarn
- Ossau: Cartulary of Ossau.

== History ==
Paul Raymond on page 5 of the 1863 dictionary noted that Andoins was the seat of the second largest barony in Béarn which also included Limendous. He also noted that in 1385 there were 20 fires in Andoins and it depended on the Bailiwick of Pau.

The town was part of the archdeaconry of Vic-Bilh, which depended on the bishopric of Lescar of which Lembeye was the capital.

=== Heraldry ===
Arms of Andoins	Blazon: Or, a lion vert.

== Administration ==
List of Successive Mayors

From	To	Name	Party	Position
1995	2001	Jean Gabaix		
2001	2014	Isabelle Lahore	MoDem	
2014	2020	Christian Roché		

=== Intercommunality ===
Andois is part of six inter-communal structures:

- the public agency for local management;
- the Communauté de communes du Nord-Est Béarn;
- the AEP association of the Ousse Valley;
- the energy association for Pyrénées-Atlantiques;
- the intercommunal association for consolidation of the communes of the plain of Ousse;
- the intercommunal association for the construction of the rescue centre at Soumoulou.

== Demography ==
The inhabitants of the commune are known as Andonésien(ne)s in French.

Historical population

Year	Pop.	±% p.a.
1793	510	—
1821	542	+0.22%
1846	558	+0.12%
1872	527	−0.22%
1901	454	−0.51%
1926	380	−0.71%
1946	315	−0.93%
1962	329	+0.27%
1968	418	+4.07%

Year	Pop.	±% p.a.
1975	333	−3.20%
1982	469	+5.01%
1990	514	+1.15%
1999	522	+0.17%
2007	620	+2.17%
2012	622	+0.06%
2017	637	+0.48%
2023	727	+2.23%

Source: EHESS and INSEE

== Culture and Heritage ==
=== Civil heritage ===
The commune has a number of buildings that are registered as historical monuments:

- A House at Grange Montane (19th century)
- A Fortified Area (11th century)
- A Farmhouse at Poublan (1904)
- The Maison Séries Farmhouse (1913)
- The Maison Lacaze Farmhouse (18th century)
- The Cazenave Farmhouse (1899)
- The Maison Coustet Farmhouse (18th century)
- Houses and Farms (18th - 20th centuries)

=== Religious heritage ===
The Parish Church of Saint-Laurent (19th century) is registered as an historical monument. The church contains many items that are registered as historical objects:

- The Furniture in the Church
- An Altar Vase (19th century)
- A Sunburst Monstrance (19th century)
- A Lantern (19th century)
- A Thurible (17th century)
- 2 Processional Crosses (19th century)
- A Painting: Stations of the Cross (1883)
- A Candlestick (18th century)
- 4 Candlesticks (19th century)
- A Group Sculpture: Education of the Virgin (19th century)
- A Mural Painting: Scenes from the life of Saint Lawrence (19th century)
- 3 Chandeliers (19th century)
- A Sideboard (19th century)
- A Chair and 3 Prie-dieux (19th century)
- The Choir Enclosure (1850)
- A central Stoup (19th century)
- An Altar and Tabernacle (1845)
- An Altar Cross (18th century)
- 2 Statues: Saint Peter and Saint Paul (1740 & 1760)
- Altar seating and a Tabernacle (1740 & 1760)
- Secondary Altar (1864)
- The whole Altar of the Blessed Sacrament (18th century)
- An Altar, Tabernacle, and 4 Altar Candlesticks (1841)
- 4 Stained glass windows (Bays 1–4) (1923)

== Notable people linked to the commune ==
- Guilhem Arnaud, Baron of Andoins who died in 1301. His funerary monument is displayed in the church of the Commandery of Caubin in the commune of Arthez-de-Béarn.

== See also ==
- Communes of the Pyrénées-Atlantiques department
