= Diane d'Andoins =

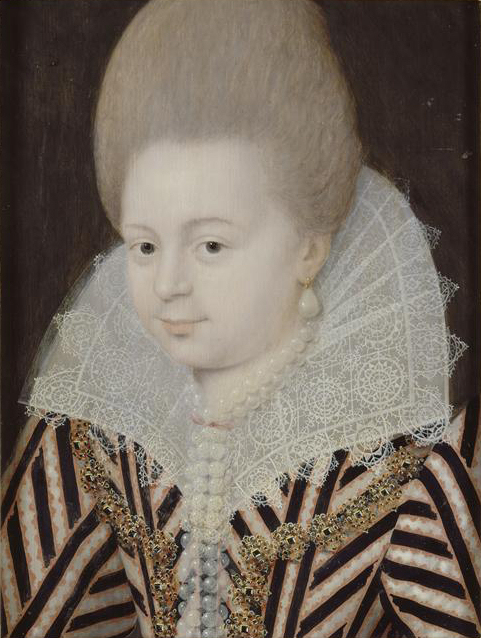
- Born: late 1554; Hagetmau
- Died: February 1621 (age 66); Hagetmau
- Other name: la belle Corisande
- Known for: Royal mistress of King Henri IV of France
- Spouse: Philibert of Gramont, Count of Guiche (m. 1568; died 1580)
- Children: Antoine II de Gramont-Touloujon; Catherine
- Parent(s): Paul of Andoins; Marguerite of Cauna

Diane d'Andoins or d'Andouins (Diane of Andoins) was born in Hagetmau in the fall of 1554, and died there in February 1621. The Countess of Guiche, and called "the beautiful Corisande", she was known for having been a royal mistress of King Henri III of Navarre (the future Henri IV of France) between 1582 and 1591.

== Biography ==
She was the daughter of Marguerite of Cauna and of Paul, Baron of Andoins, Lord of Lescar, Viscount and later Count of Louvigny. She later became one of the wealthiest heiresses of Béarn.

Emancipated on 6 August 1567 (at the age of 13), she was married on Thursday 21 November 1568 to Philibert of Gramont, Seneschal of Béarn, Count of Gramont and of Guiche, Viscount of Aster and of Louvigny, Lord of Lescure, and Governor of Bayonne (1552–1580) who was, at the time only 15 himself. Philibert died of a wound received in 1580 during the siege of La Fère in Picardy, and Diane found herself a widow at the age of 26. She was the mother of Antoine II, Duke of Gramont, and a daughter, Catherine.

A woman renowned for great beauty and no less extensive culture, she was particularly acquainted with Montaigne. She fell in love with courtly literature, and it was in the chivalric romance Amadis de Gaula that she found a heroine that she could identify with, and whose name she adopted: "Corisande".

Henri IV of Navarre met her, probably thanks to the friendship between her and his sister Catherine de Bourbon (despite their difference of religion, Catherine being a Calvinist while Diane was Catholic) and he courted her persistently.

She had a great influence on him between 1582 and 1590, when she, unlike his other mistresses, was a partner in his business dealings. The countess, in return, remained devoted to him all his life. During the Wars of the League, she sold her diamonds for him, pawned her possessions, and went so far as to send out to him an army of 20,000 Gascons whom she had enlisted at her expense. Henry wrote to her "with his blood" a promise of marriage, according to an anecdote told by Agrippa d'Aubigné, but he did not keep his word. She was probably the cause of the disfavor of Françoise de Montmorency-Fosseux (Henry's previous mistress from 1579 to 1581) and Protestants worried about the influence of this Catholic on the sovereign of Béarn. Certain genealogists attribute a son, Antonin, to this affair, but the information is doubtful. (Note: Raymond Ritter shows that this was her son by Philibert, and her affair with the king was childless. Diane's sister-in-law, Catherine, Countess of Lauzun, was the grandmother of the first Duke of Lauzun, the secret husband of la Grande Mademoiselle)

She died in February 1621 in her castle of Hagetmau.

== See also ==
- fr:Esther Imbert (in French)
- Antoine III de Gramont
- Henry IV of France's wives and mistresses
- List of French royal mistresses

== Bibliography ==
- Ribeton, Olivier (1985). "Un musée Gramont à Bayonne". Bulletins de la Société des Sciences, Lettres et Arts de Bayonne (in French) (141). Bayonne.p. 403
- Boucher, Jacqueline (1995). Deux épouses et reines à la fin du XVIe siècle: Louise de Lorraine et Marguerite de France (in French). Publications de l'Universitie de Saint-Étienne.
- d'Aubigné, Agrippa (1999). Weber, H. (ed.). Oeuvres (Works) (in French). Droz.
- Ritter, Raymond (1959). Une dame de chevalerie, Corisande d'Andoins, comtesse de Guiche. A. Michel.

=== External links ===
- Media related to Diane d'Andouins at Wikimedia Commons
