= Ousse =

- Commune
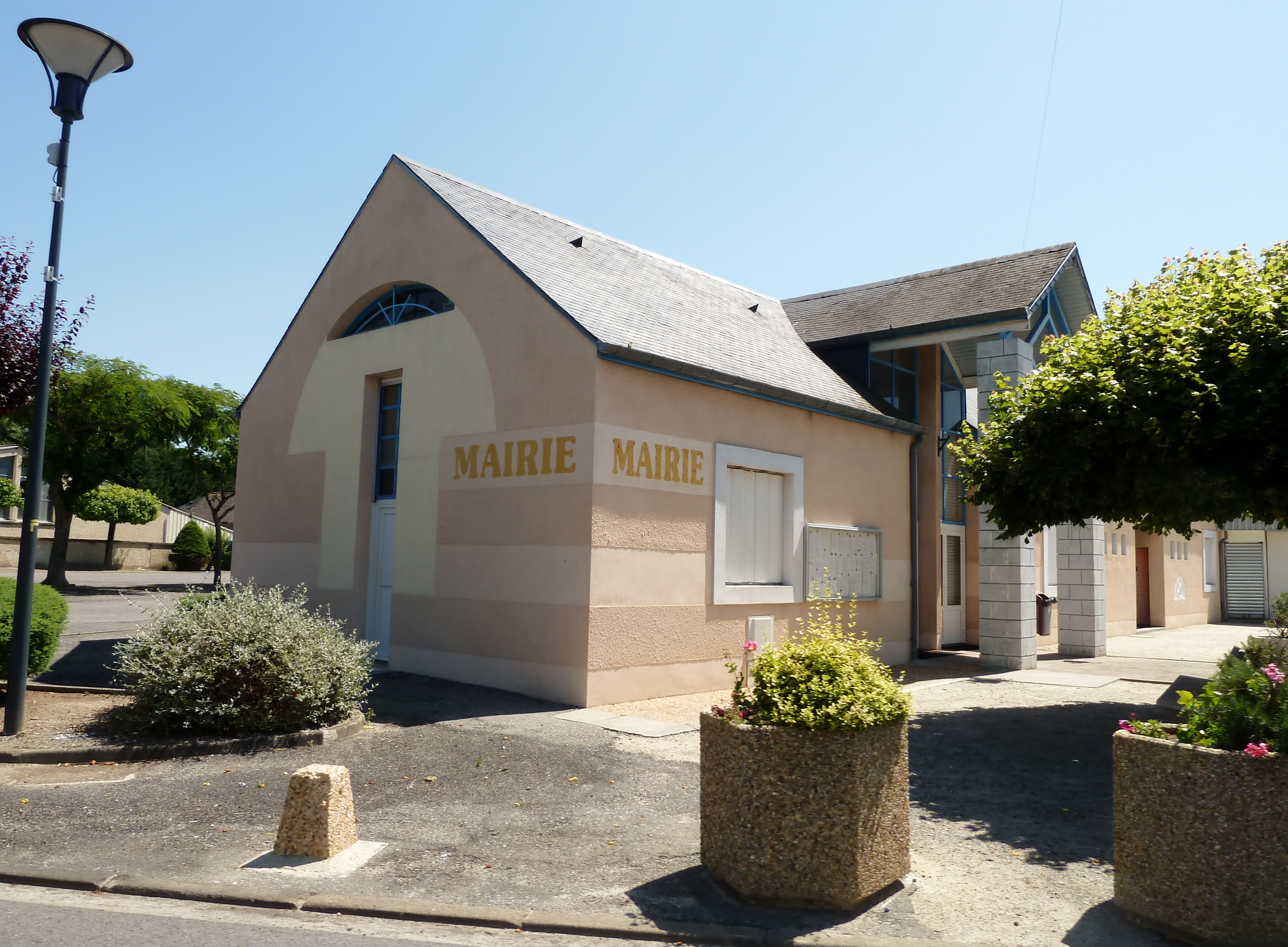
- Town Hall
- Location of Ousse
- Location within France Location within Nouvelle-Aquitaine
- Coordinates: 43°17′06″N 0°16′03″W
- Country: France
- Region: Nouvelle-Aquitaine
- Department: Pyrénées-Atlantiques
- Arrondissement: Pau
- Canton: Pays de Morlaàs et du Montanérès
- Intercommunality: CA Pau Béarn Pyrénées

Government
  - Mayor (2020–2026): Jean-Claude Bouriat
- Area^{1}: 4.46 km^{2} (1.72 sq mi)
- Elevation: 238 m (781 ft)
- Highest elevation: 334 m (1,096 ft)
- Lowest elevation: 223 m (732 ft)
- Population (2023): 1,672
  - Density: 375/km^{2} (971/sq mi)
- Time zone: UTC+01:00 (CET)
  - Summer (DST): UTC+02:00 (CEST)
- INSEE/Postal code: 64439 /64320
- ^{1} French Land Register data, which excludes lakes, ponds, glaciers > 1 km^{2} (0.386 sq mi or 247 acres) and river estuaries.

Ousse (French pronunciation: [us]; Occitan: Ossa) is a commune in the Pyrénées-Atlantiques department in south-western France. In 1973, it was merged into the commune Idron-Lée-Ousse-Sendets (renamed Idron-Ousse-Sendets after Lée left the commune in 1989) with three other communes: Lée, Idron and Sendets. In 2000 the commune of Ousse was recreated.

== See also ==
- Communes of the Pyrénées-Atlantiques department
