= Bidache =

Bidache Bidaxune
- Commune
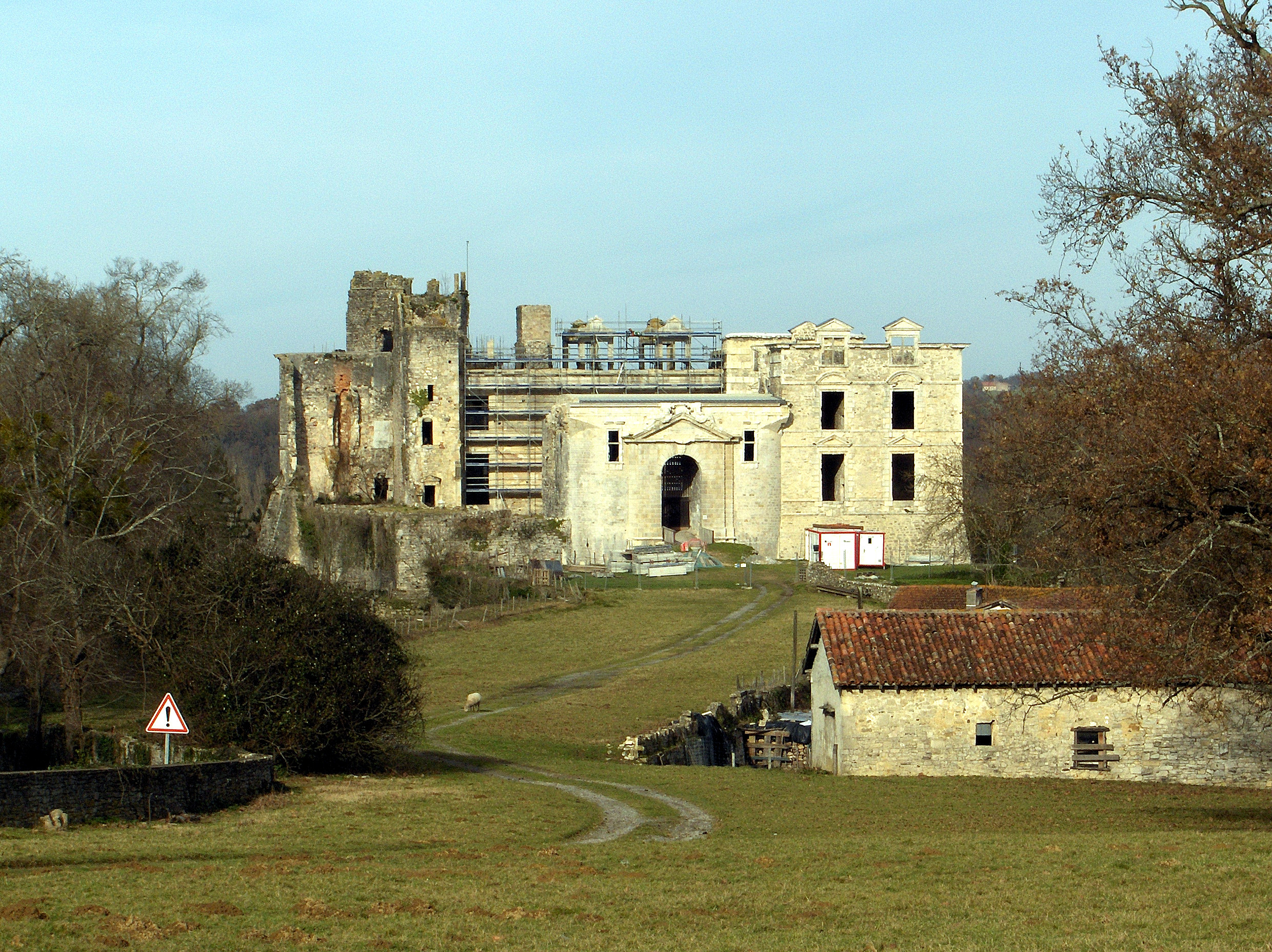
- The château of Bidache

- Coat of arms
- Location of Bidache
- Location within France Location within Nouvelle-Aquitaine
- Coordinates: 43°29′03″N 1°08′24″W
- Country: France
- Region: Nouvelle-Aquitaine
- Department: Pyrénées-Atlantiques
- Arrondissement: Bayonne
- Canton: Pays de Bidache, Amikuze et Ostibarre
- Intercommunality: CA Pays Basque

Government
  - Mayor (2020–2026): Jean-François Lasserre
- Area^{1}: 30.43 km^{2} (11.75 sq mi)
- Highest elevation: 162 m (531 ft)
- Lowest elevation: 0 m (0 ft)
- Population (2023): 1,338
  - Density: 43.97/km^{2} (113.9/sq mi)
- Time zone: UTC+01:00 (CET)
  - Summer (DST): UTC+02:00 (CEST)
- INSEE/Postal code: 64123 /64520
- ^{1} French Land Register data, which excludes lakes, ponds, glaciers > 1 km^{2} (0.386 sq mi or 247 acres) and river estuaries.

Bidache (French pronunciation: [bydaʃ]; Occitan: Bidaishe; Basque: Bidaxune) is a town and commune in the Pyrénées-Atlantiques department of south western France. Between 1570 and 1793 it was the centre of the sovereign Principality of Bidache.

== See also ==
- Communes of the Pyrénées-Atlantiques department
