= Henri de Favanne =

English painter (1668–1752)

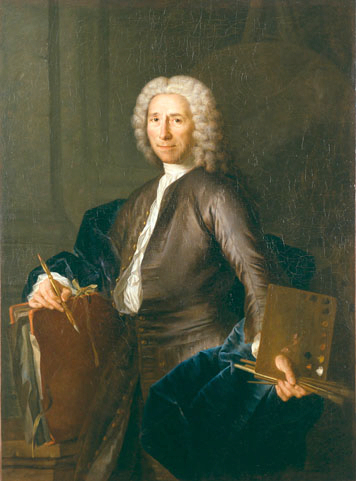
- Portrait of Henri de Favanne by Jacques Autreau (1741)
- Born: Henri Antoine de Favanne; 3 October 1668; London, England
- Died: 27 April 1752 (aged 83); Paris, France
- Awards: Grand Prix de Rome

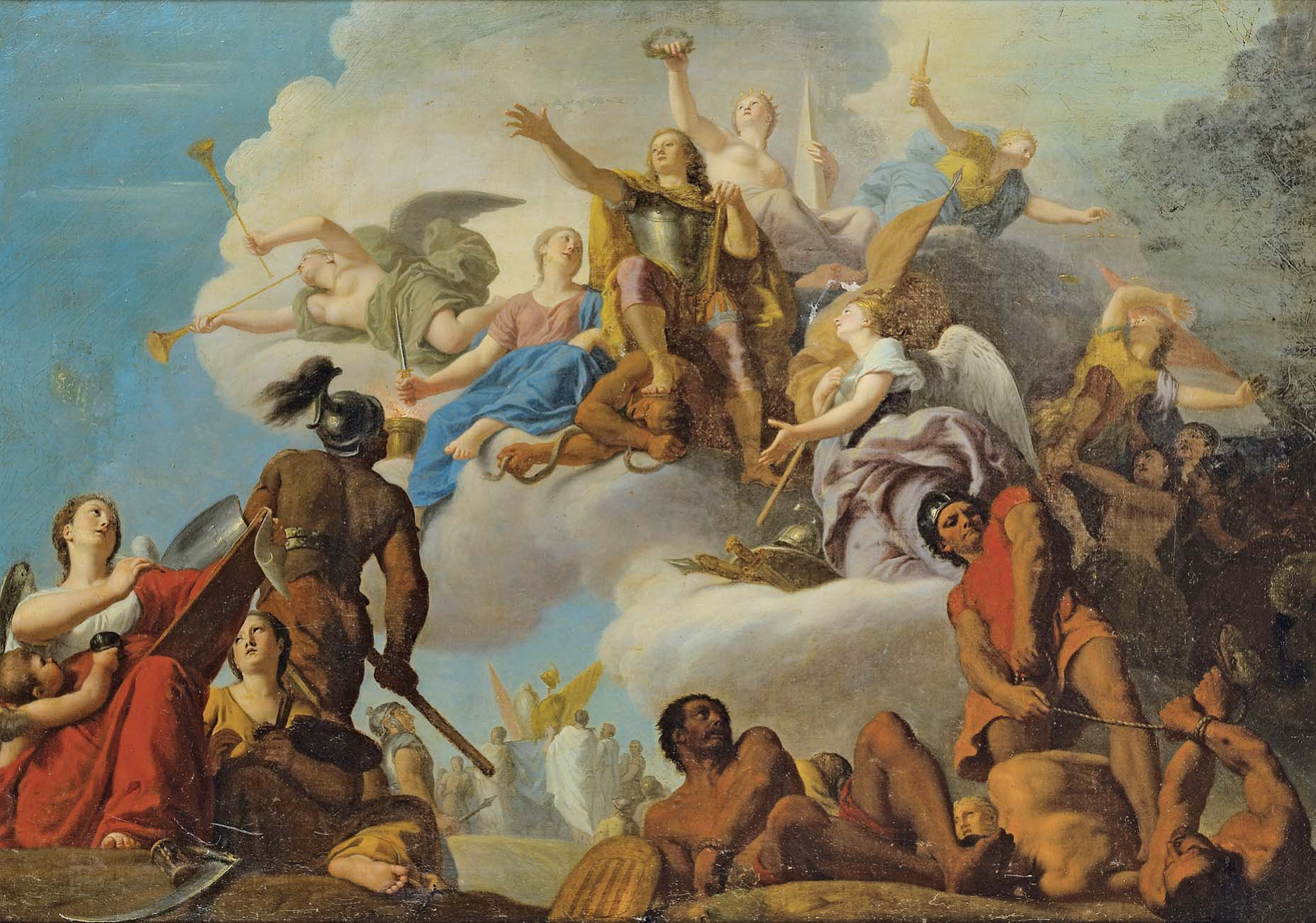
Sketch for La bataille d’Almança ou La bataille de Villaviciosa (c.1714)

Henri Antoine de Favanne or Favannes (3 October 1668 – 27 April 1752) was an English-born French painter of historical subjects.

== Life ==
He was born in London on 3 October 1668, and returned to France with his family in 1688. He studied under René Houasse, a pupil of Charles le Brun. He went to Italy in 1693, and was awarded the Grand Prix de Rome in 1693. He then spent ten years in Spain in the service of Madame des Ursins.

In 1714 he returned France, where he was commissioned by Madame des Ursins' secretary Jean d'Aubigny to decorate the newly built Château de Chanteloup. There he painted the gallery – decorating it with ten scenes from the life of Philip V – a salon and the chapel. The château no longer exists, but there are three studies for decorations in the gallery in French public collections: The Triumph of Justice in the Louvre, The Kingdoms of Valencia and Aragon Surrender to Philip V in the Musée des Beaux-Arts at Lille and The Battle of Almança or The Battle of Villaviciosa acquired by Musée des Beaux-Arts at Tours in 2007. The museum at Tours also owns two paintings by Favanne which used to hang in the chateau, and a study for a work in the salon.

In Paris, he was elected rector of the Academy. He died on 27 April 1752.
