= Château de Chanteloup =

Building in Amboise, France

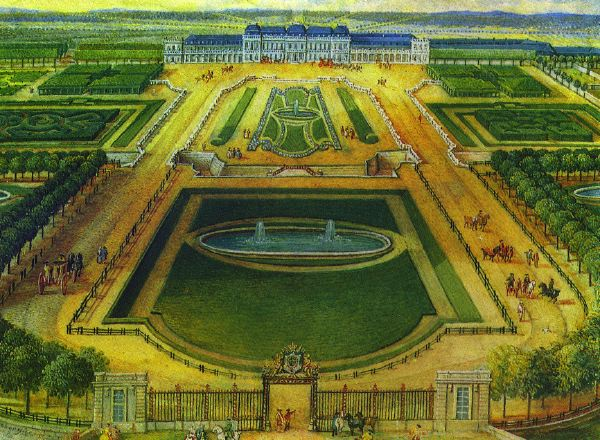
- View from the north in 1767

- Location within France

General information
- Architectural style: Baroque and Neoclassical
- Location: Amboise (Indre-et-Loire), France
- Coordinates: 47.39548°N 0.96988°E
- Construction started: 1583
- Renovated: c. 1700, 1711, 1762
- Demolished: 1823

Design and construction
- Architects: 1711: Robert de Cotte; 1762–1775: Louis-Denis Le Camus

The Château de Chanteloup was an imposing 18th-century French château with elaborate gardens, compared by some contemporaries to Versailles. It was located in the Loire Valley on the south bank of the river Loire, downstream from the town of Amboise and about 2.3 kilometres (1.4 mi) southwest of the royal Château d'Amboise. From 1761 to 1785 Chanteloup belonged to King Louis XV's prime minister, the Duke of Choiseul. The château was mostly demolished in 1823, but some features of the park remain, notably the Pagoda of Chanteloup, a significant tourist attraction.

== History ==
=== Origins ===
In the 16th century the site was nothing more than a tenanted farm, but it was elevated to a fief in January 1668. François le Franc, a fruit seller to the Duke of Alençon (youngest son of Henry II of France and Catherine de Médicis), purchased it on 7 June 1583 and erected a house with a chapel. He became the mayor of Amboise in 1588. Claude-Arnoul Poncher, who acquired the property by his marriage to Marie-Madeleine le Franc (daughter of François le Franc, grandson of François le Franc, the fruit seller), sold it on 21 October 1695 to Louis le Boultz, the Grand Master of Waterworks and Forests of Touraine, Anjou and Maine. Around 1700 Louis le Boultz created large, well-ordered gardens and added other structures, so that it was no longer a simple country house.

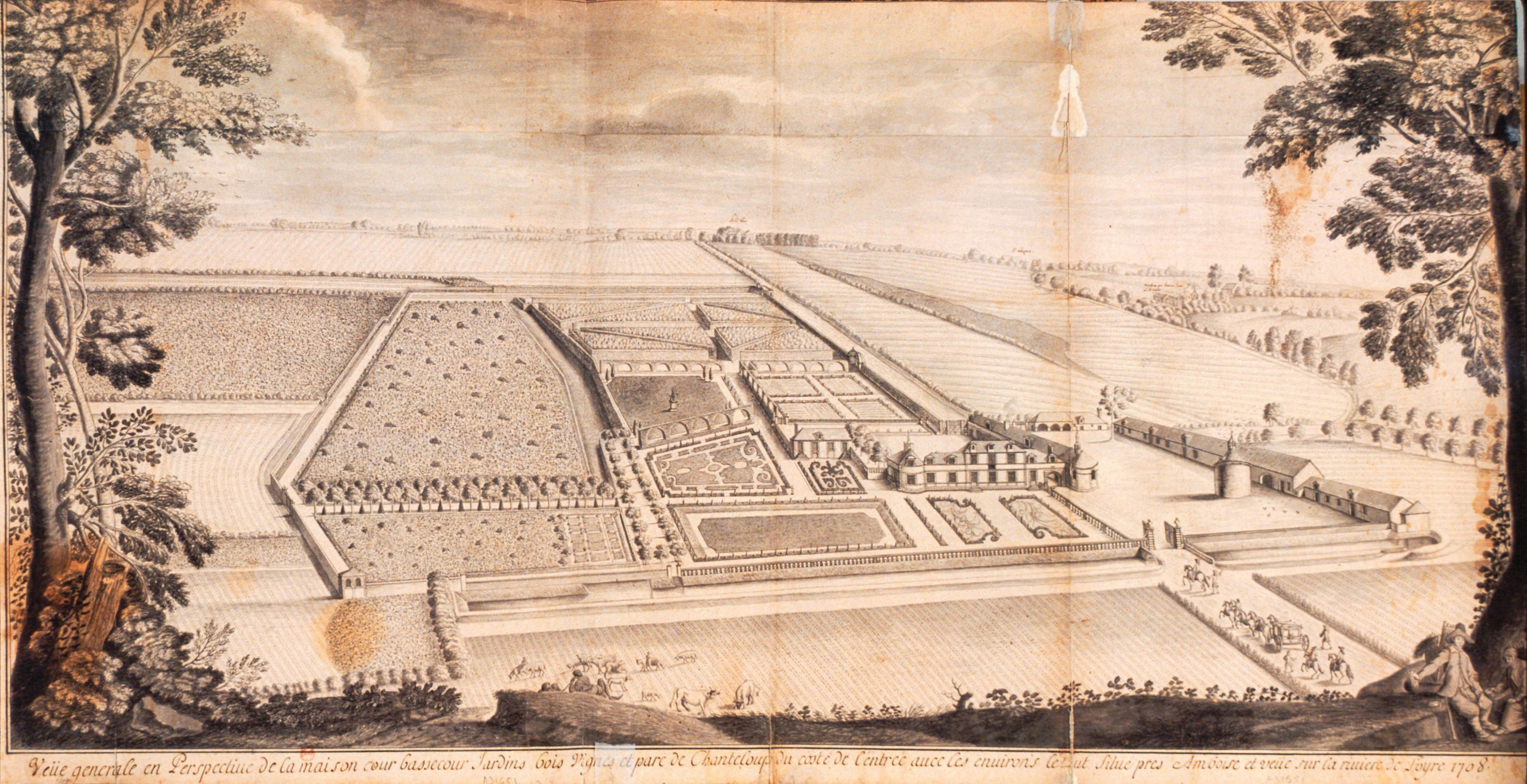
"General perspective view of the house, courtyard, service courtyard, gardens, woods, vineyards, and park of Chanteloup from the entrance side with the environs, all situated near Amboise, and view toward the Loire River" (1708)

=== 1708–1761: D'Aubigny ===
==== Creation of the château ====
On 22 February 1708, Louis Le Boultz sold the house and seigneury of Chanteloup to Jean Bouteroue d'Aubigny, who also acquired the office of Grand Master of Waterworks and Forests of France for the département of Touraine, Anjou and Maine. D'Aubigny was the secretary for the Princesse des Ursins from 1701 to 1714, a period when she was very influential at the court of Philip V of Spain, the grandson of Louis XIV. D'Aubigny hired the well-known French architect Robert de Cotte in 1711 to remodel the house into a château. Robert de Cotte also worked on the Princess's apartments at the Royal Palace in Madrid and on designs for the Spanish king's country estate on the outskirts of Madrid, the Buen Retiro. The Château de Chanteloup was probably intended for her future use, but she was never to see it. At her death in 1722, as her sole heir, d'Aubigny retained sole possession of the château and its park.

D'Aubigny's focus in 1711, when construction began, was on Spain and the south. Robert de Cotte modified the central part, the corps de logis and the two pavilions at its ends (most of which already existed), and added the lateral wings flanking the cour d'honneur, a design typical of a château, so that the ensemble faced south. The principal entrance to the forecourt leading to the château was on the south side, on the road to Spain. There was a passageway from the cour d'honneur through the west wing to the service court (basse cour) and stables on the west. The remodeling included the creation of an east-facing gallery in the east wing and a chapel in the northwest corner, both with a project of decoration entrusted to Henri de Favanne, d'Aubigny's favorite painter, who had already worked on d'Aubigny's Parisian hôtel.

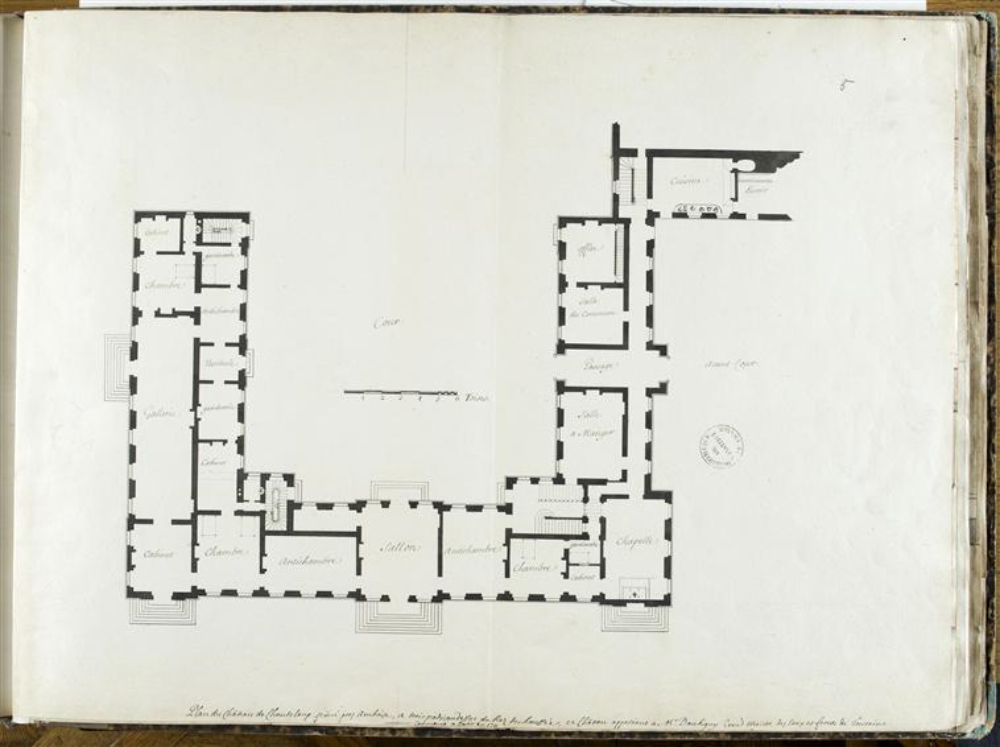
Plan of the premier étage (first floor), 1711 (Bibliothèque de l'Institut de France, Paris)

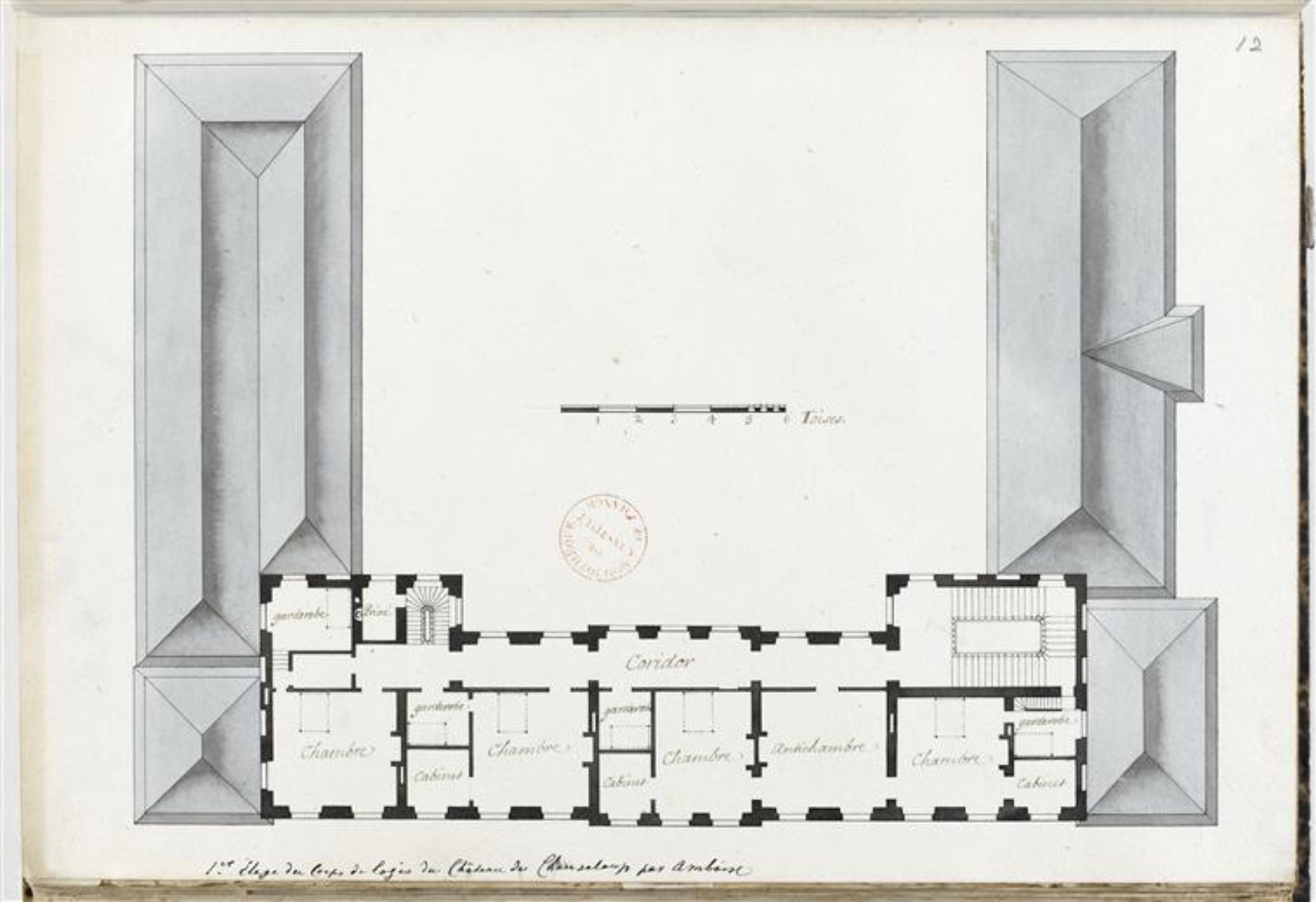
Plan of the deuxième étage (second floor), 1711 (Bibliothèque de l'Institut de France, Paris)
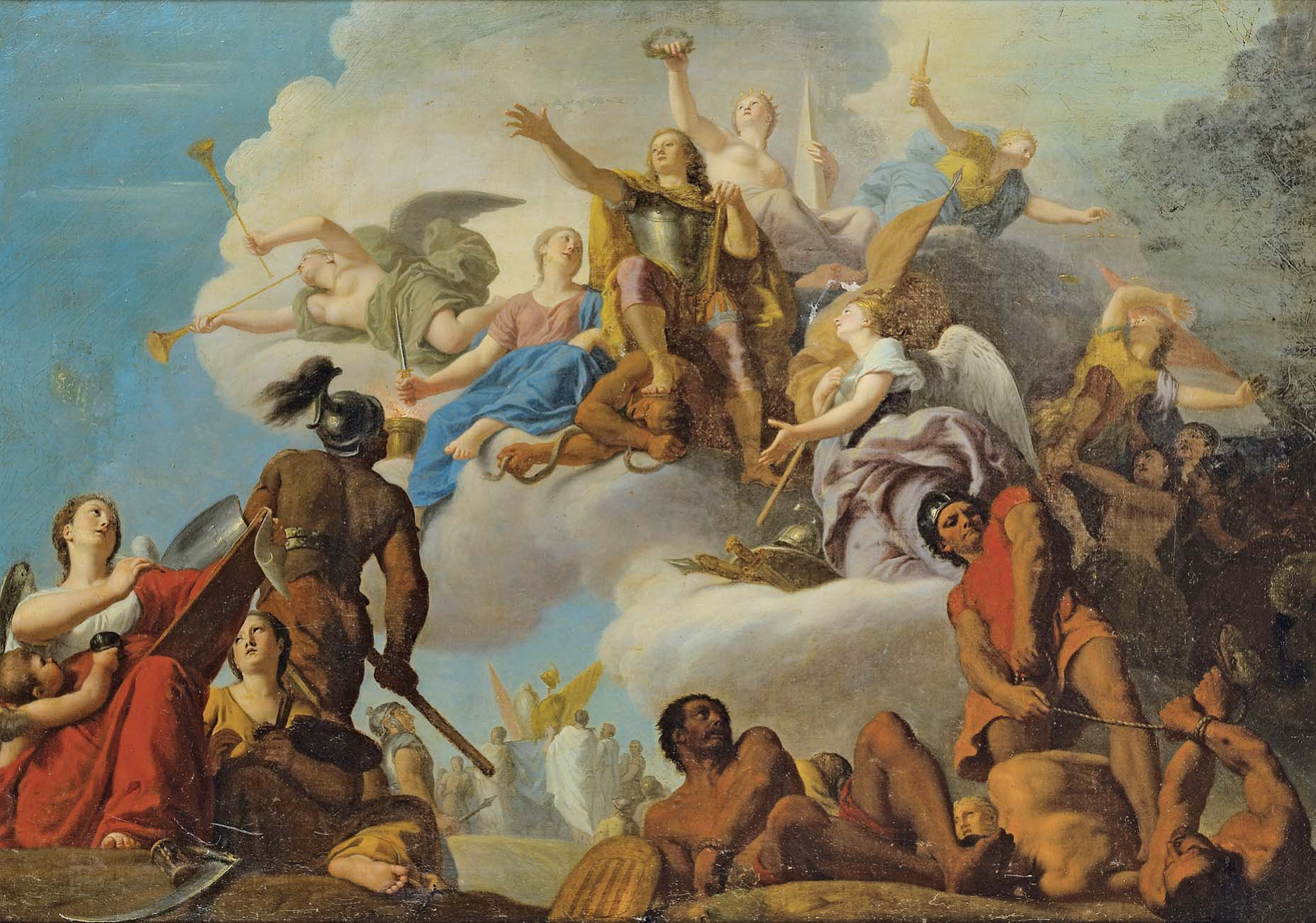
The Battle of Almança or The Battle of Villaviciosa, study by Henri de Favanne for the Grande Galerie (private collection)

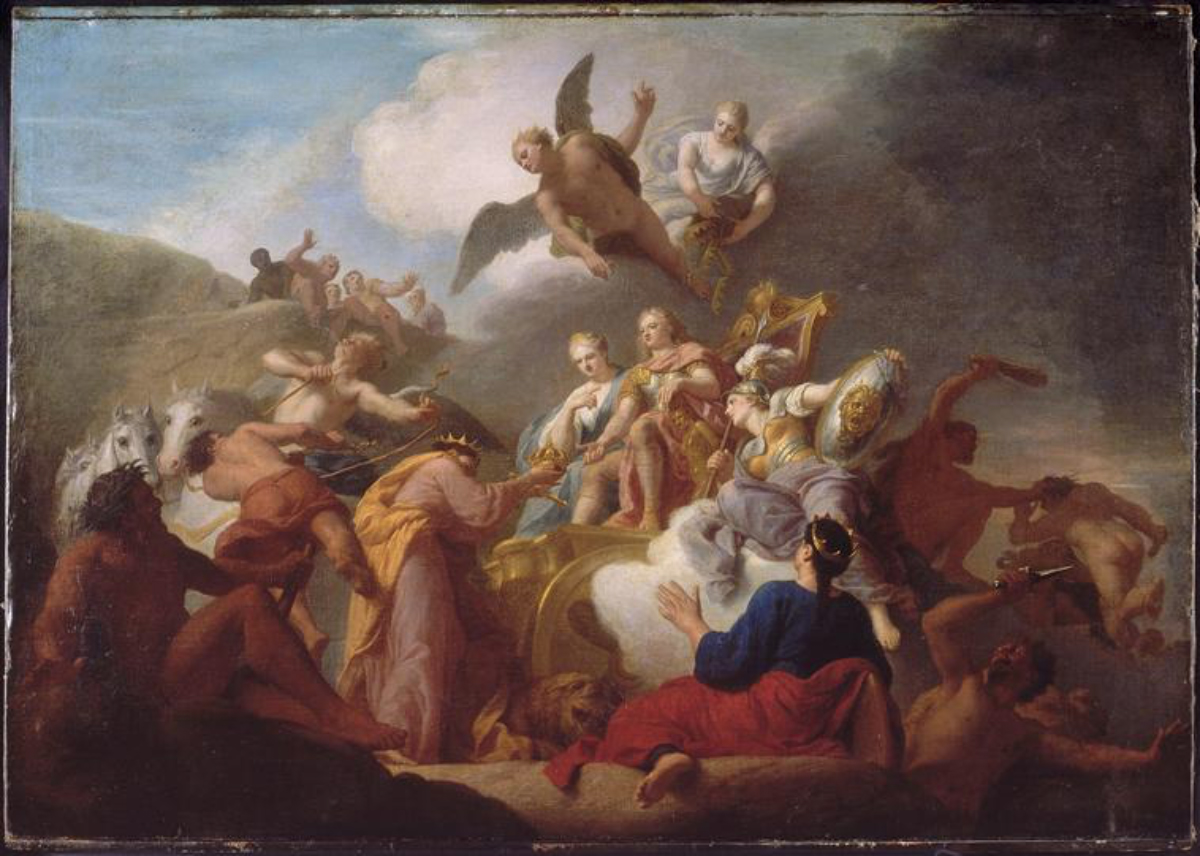
The Kingdoms of Valencia and Aragon Surrender to Philip V, King of Spain, by Henri de Favanne for the Grande Galerie (Palais des Beaux-Arts, Lille)

==== Creation of the French formal gardens ====
D'Aubigny also extended and enhanced the gardens and the park, which due to the terrain and the river were mostly to the south. The park was divided into numerous geometrically arranged groves of tall trees (bosquets), bordered by alleys lined with a variety of species of trees, and decorated with ornamental ponds. It was enclosed on the east, west, and south by a wall and on the north by a moat, and encompassed an area of about 500 arpents (380 hectares, 940 acres).

D'Aubigny died in the Château de Chanteloup in April 1732. Saint-Simon, who died in 1755, described Chanteloup in the period after d'Aubigny's death, as "one of the most beautiful and singular places in all France, and the most superbly furnished."

A plan of 1761 from the Municipal Library of Tours shows gardens around the château in the formal French style, perfected by André Le Nôtre in the latter half of the 17th century, with parterres of broderie and lawn, galleries of topiary, extensive bosquets (especially to the east and southeast), water basins, tree-lined paths and kitchen garden (potager) on the west side, south of the stables and other service buildings.

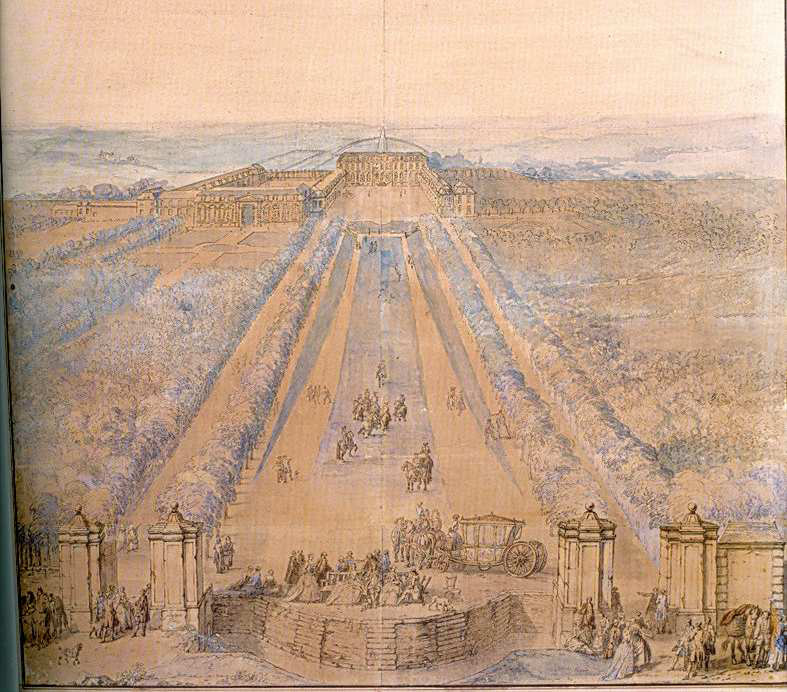
View from the south of the Château de Chanteloup in 1762, showing the Porte d'Espagne (Spanish Gate), painted by Pierre Lenfant (Musée des Beaux-Arts, Tours)

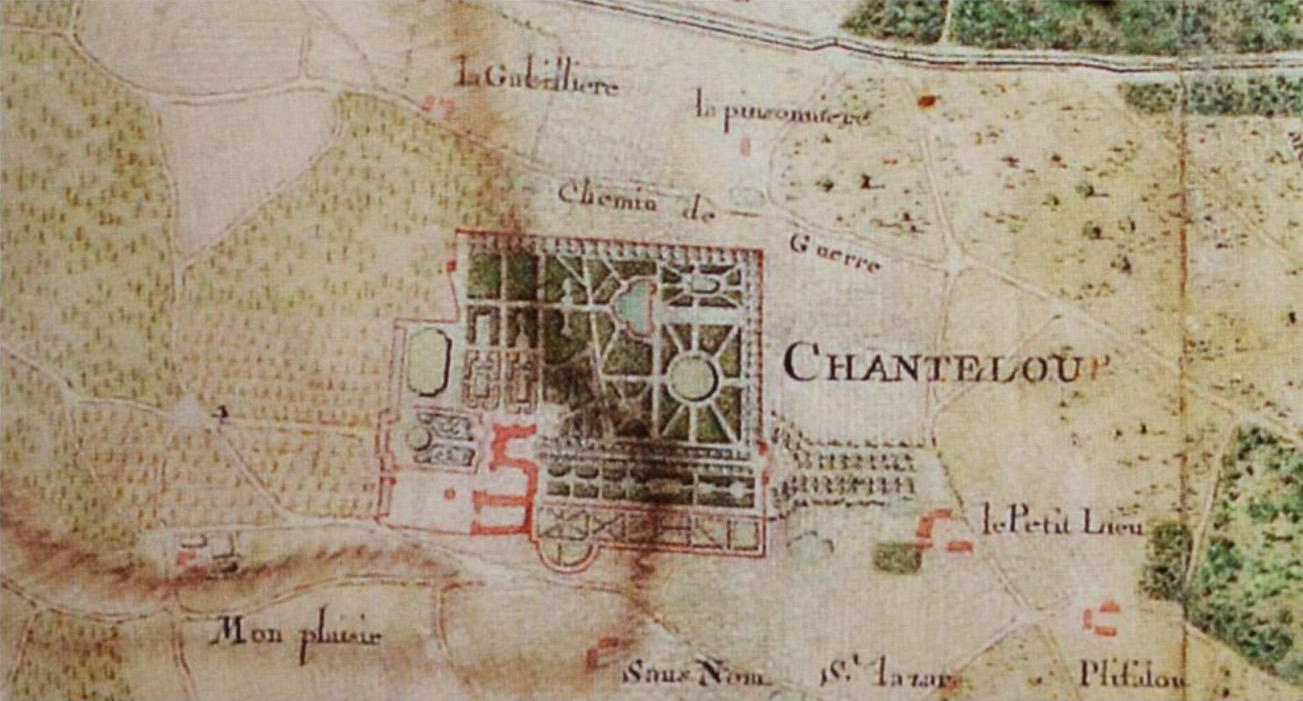
Detail from a plan of 1761 (north to the left), showing the French formal gardens (Bibliothèque Municipale, Tours)

=== 1761–1785: The Duke of Choiseul ===
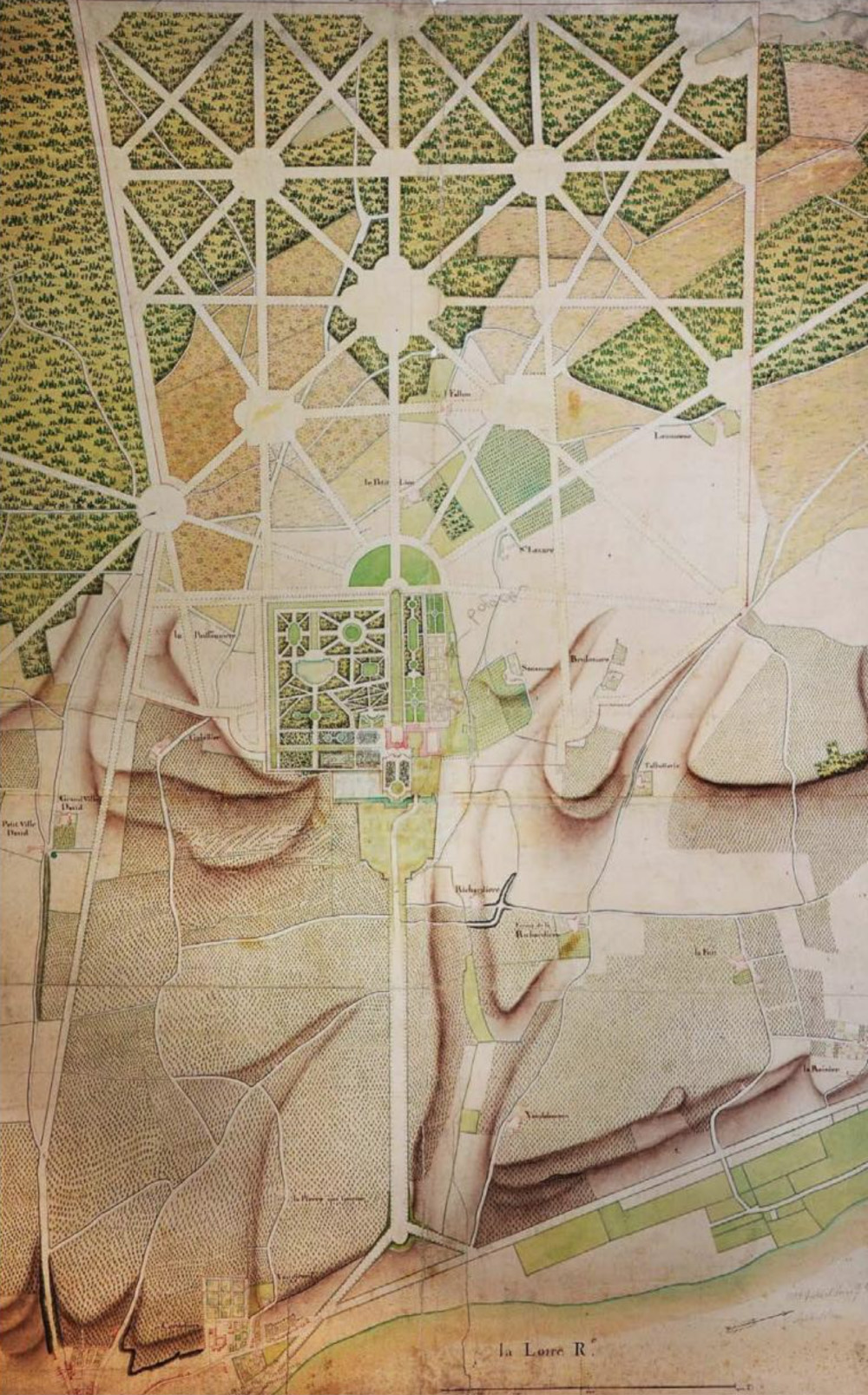
General site plan of the domain of Chanteloup in 1761 (north at the bottom), showing the development of the Grand Park with geometric patterns of avenues and alleys (Département des Cartes et Plans, Archives Nationales, Paris)

==== Grand Park ====
The Marquise d'Armentières, a descendant of d'Aubigny, sold the château in 1761 to King Louis XV's prime minister, the Duke of Choiseul, who also acquired adjoining land, increasing the size of the estate to 6,000 arpents (4,600 hectares, 11,000 acres). For comparison, the gardens and park of Versailles, when they reached their greatest extent under Louis XIV, covered an area of 2,473 hectares (6,110 acres). A 1761 general site plan, from the French National Archives in Paris, shows that one of the first changes Choiseul made was to cut numerous tree-lined avenues and alleys in complex geometric patterns in the newly acquired Forest of Amboise to the south of the château, creating a Grand Park. Seven of the avenues converge on the half-moon (demi-lune) parterre of the Spanish Gate, forming a classic French patte d'oie (goose-foot pattern), a feature seen at several grand French châteaux of the 17th century, including the Château de Richelieu, Vaux-le-Vicomte, and Versailles.

==== Master plan ====
Choiseul engaged the architect Louis-Denis Le Camus to modernize and enlarge the château. A master plan (grand dessein) was developed which was never to be completely realized. A version of 1761 at the Bibliothèque nationale de France shows numerous proposed modifications and additions to the château of Robert de Cotte. For example, this plan shows a theatre wing running east from the southern end of the east lateral wing, which is not seen in numerous later representations of the château. Other features, which were realized in one form or another, included additional courtyards, stables, and service buildings to the west of the château. Six miniature paintings by Louis-Nicolas van Blarenberghe dated 1767, which decorate a gold snuffbox, show the architectural composition as intended by Choiseul and his architect, such as the theatre wing, rather than that which had actually been built.

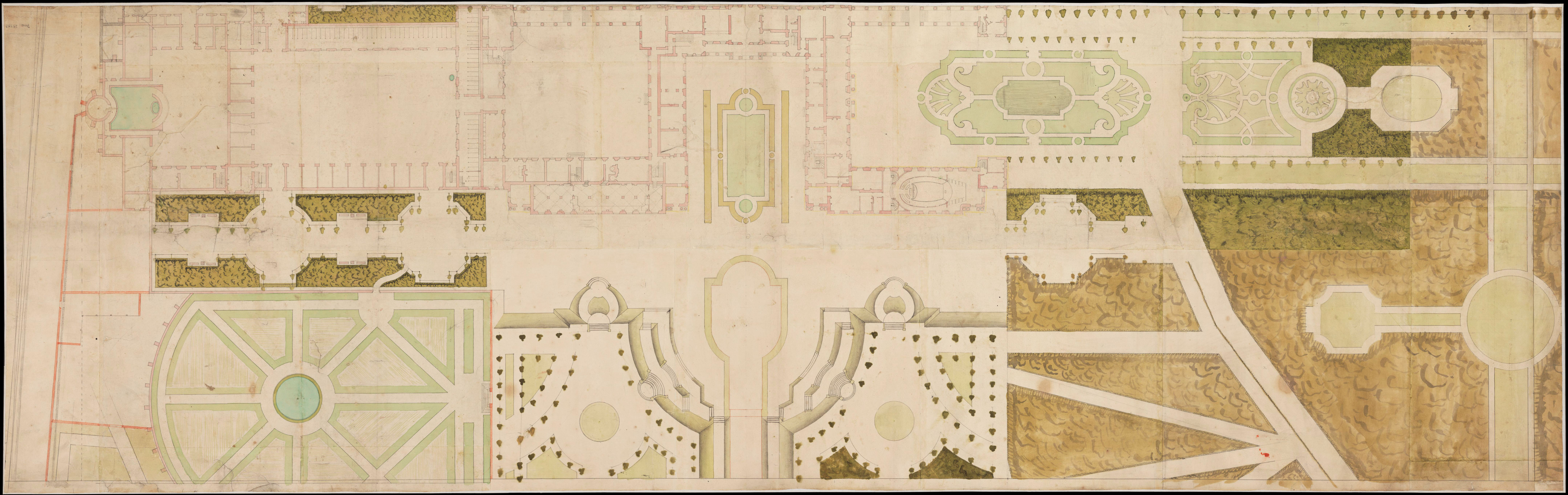
Master plan of the Château de Chanteloup of 1761, north at the top (Bibliothèque nationale de France)

==== North facade and entrance ====
In 1765, one of the additions actually executed was the extension of the north facade to the east and west with two 9-bay, open peristyles, recalling the Grand Trianon at Versailles. Each was topped with a promenade enclosed with balustrades decorated with ornamental vases and terminated with rectangular pavilions, the one on the east with a Salle des Bains (Bath Hall), and the one on the west with a chapel. Each of the matching pavilions was raised by one storey and covered with a terrace with a balustrade.

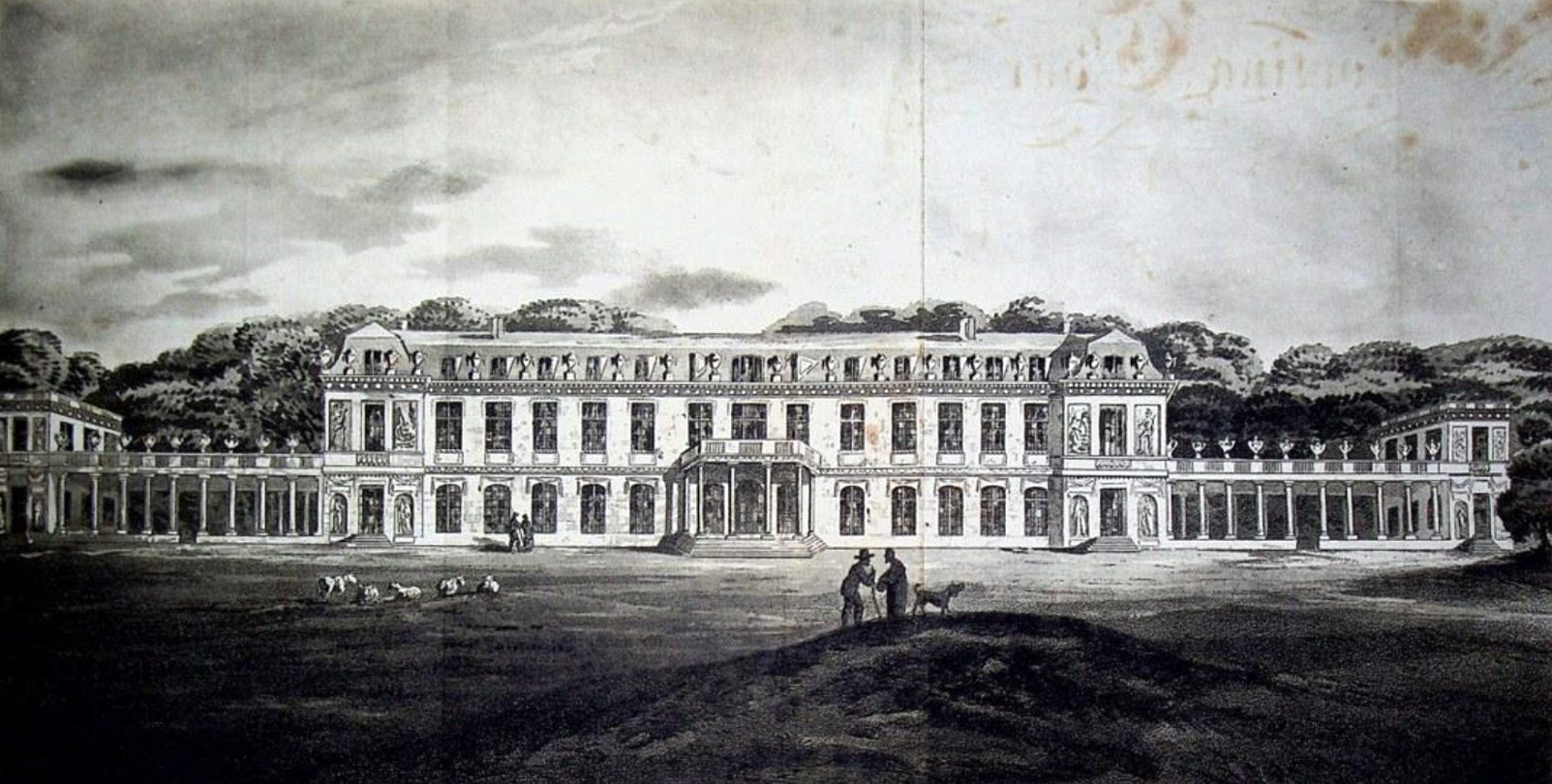
View of the north facade with the colonnades and pavilions added by Louis-Denis Le Camus

Choiseul and Le Camus also shifted the main entrance to the north, allowing access from the road along the Loire by which carriages arrived from Amboise and Paris. The great entrance grille, the Grille Dorée (Golden Grille), was 12 toise (about 24 yards) in length and was flanked by two guard pavilions, which still exist. The gate was surmounted by the Choiseul arms. Although the Choiseul arms have been lost, the gate itself is now found at the prefecture of Indre-et-Loire in Tours. The forecourt contained a sunken central parterre, surrounded by a retaining wall (ha-ha), and in its center, an ornamental basin (pièce d'eau) with two water-jet fountains (jets d'eau). The carriage drive forked, passing to either side of the parterre and crossing two parallel bridges over the moat into the entrance court, which had a long central parterre with broderie of cut grass and low bands of flowers and a circular central ornamental basin with a single jet d'eau.

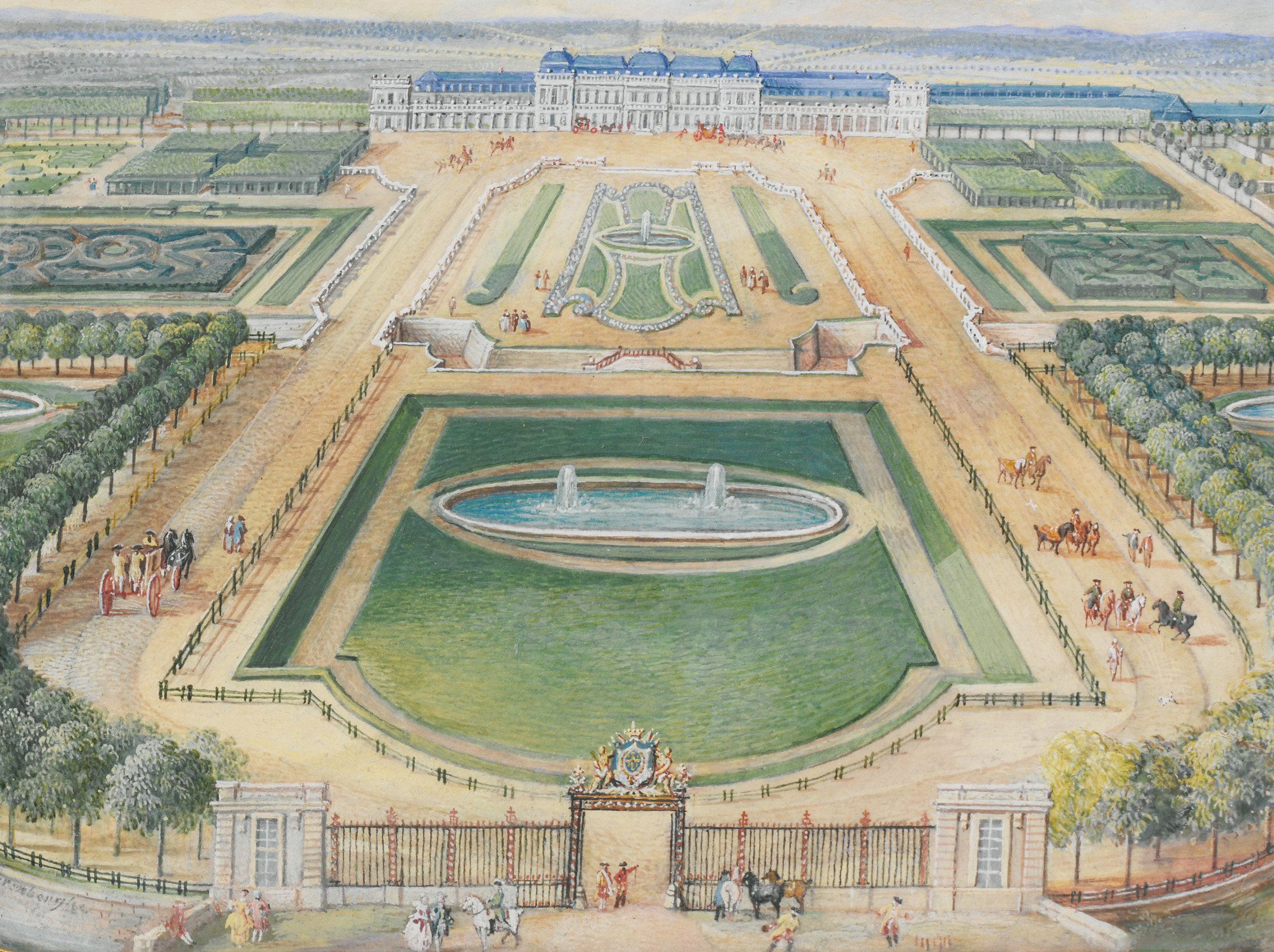
View of the north entrance in 1767 (minitature painting by Louis-Nicolas van Blarenberghe for the Chanteloup gold snuffbox, Metropolitan Museum of Art)

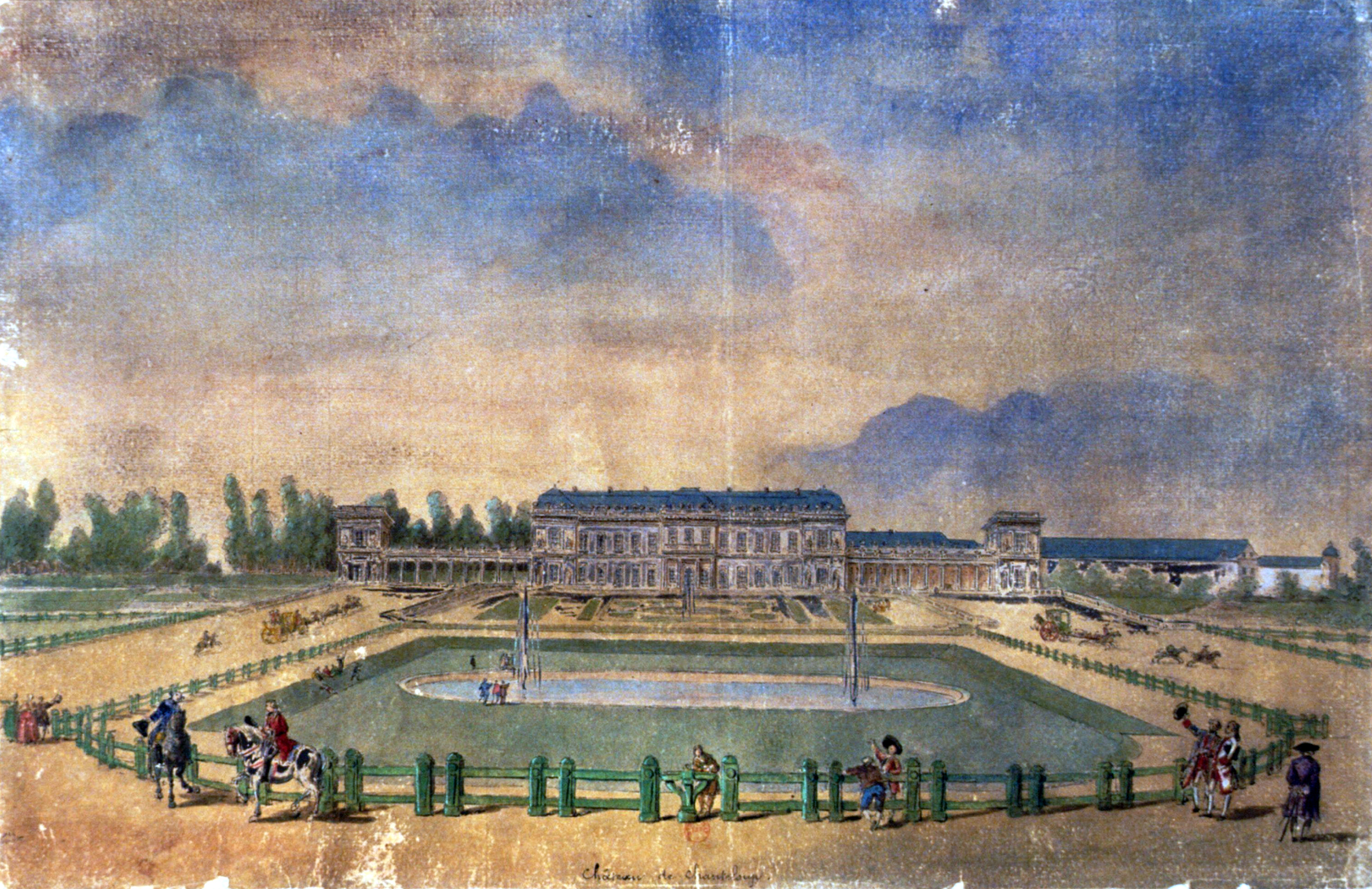
View of the entrance courtyards and north facade (anonymous drawing with watercolor, Bibliothèque nationale de France)

==== Waterworks ====
The gardens of the Petit Parc (Small Park) to the south of the château were modified very little but there was a significant exception: a long terraced cascade running from the demi-lune parterre of the former Spanish Gate to a pièce d'eau just to the south of the cour d'honneur. The demi-lune parterre itself was transformed into a lake. The cascade is depicted in two of Van Blarenberghe's snuffbox miniatures and in a 1768 painting by Jean-Pierre Houël, part of a series of six overdoors for the music room of the château, of which four survive.

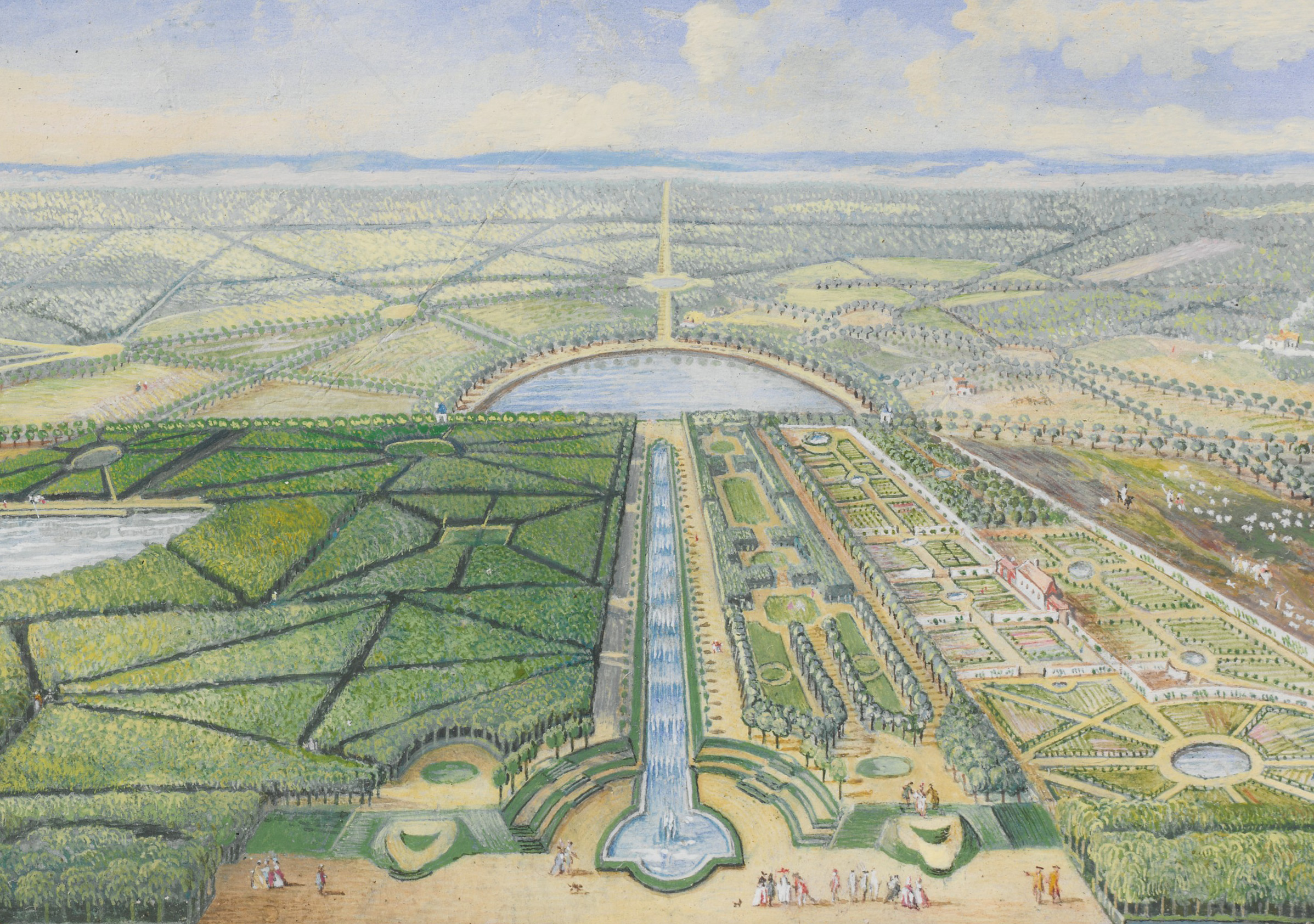
View to the south, showing the garden cascade, the half-moon lake, and the patte d'oie (miniature painting by Van Blarenberghe for the Chanteloup gold snuffbox, Metropolitan Museum of Art)

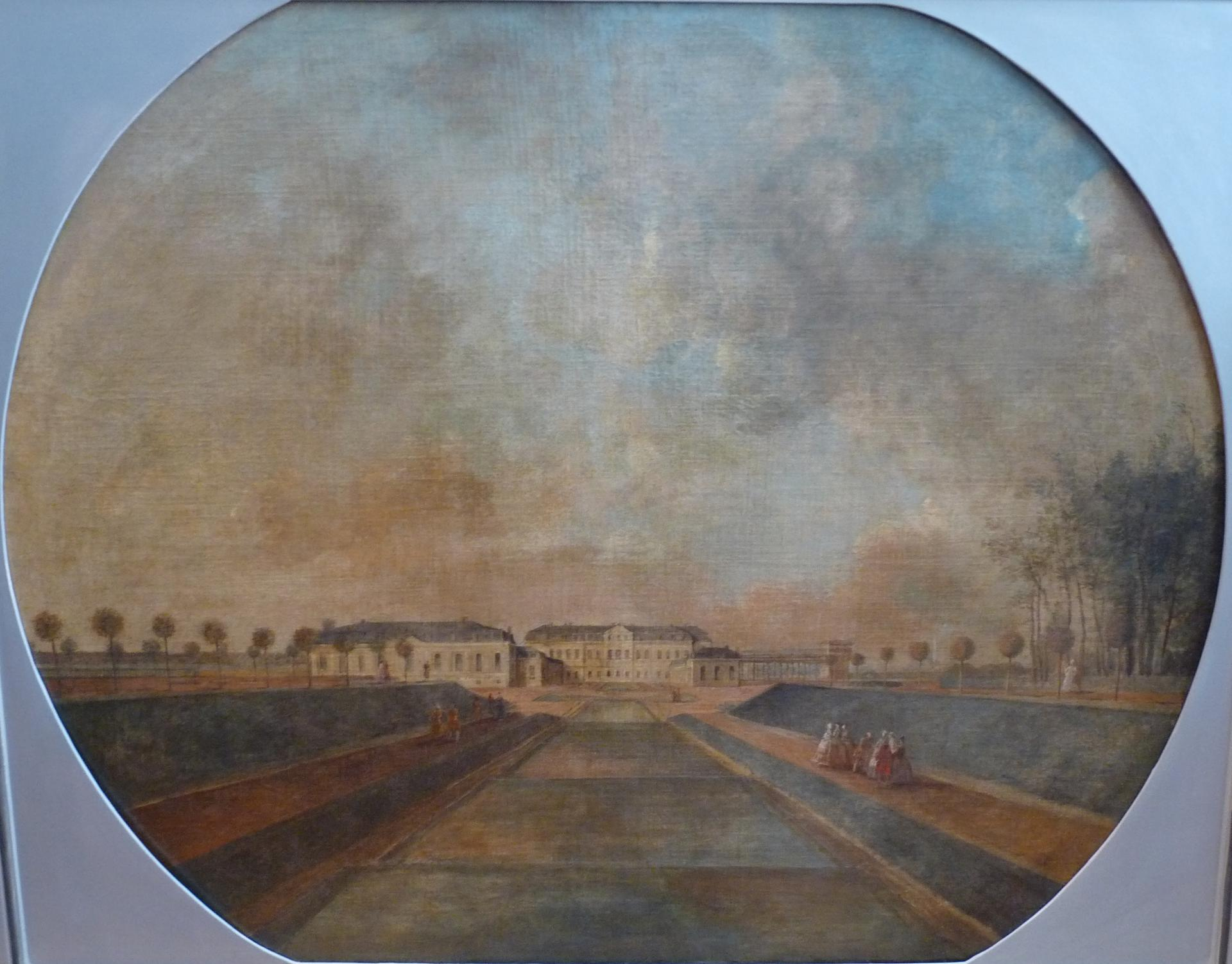
View of the south facade from the terraced garden cascade (overdoor of 1768 by Jean-Pierre Houël, Musée des Beaux-Arts, Tours)

Around 1770 another important water feature was added, a canal, leading to the south side of the demi-lune lake and aligned on the central axis of the château and the Grand Park. The canal is shown on a 1770 site plan attributed to Le Camus and is depicted in paintings by Louis-Nicolas Van Blarenberghe and Nicolas Perignon. The demi-lune lake and the canal still exist, although the canal is filled-in and has become a lawn.

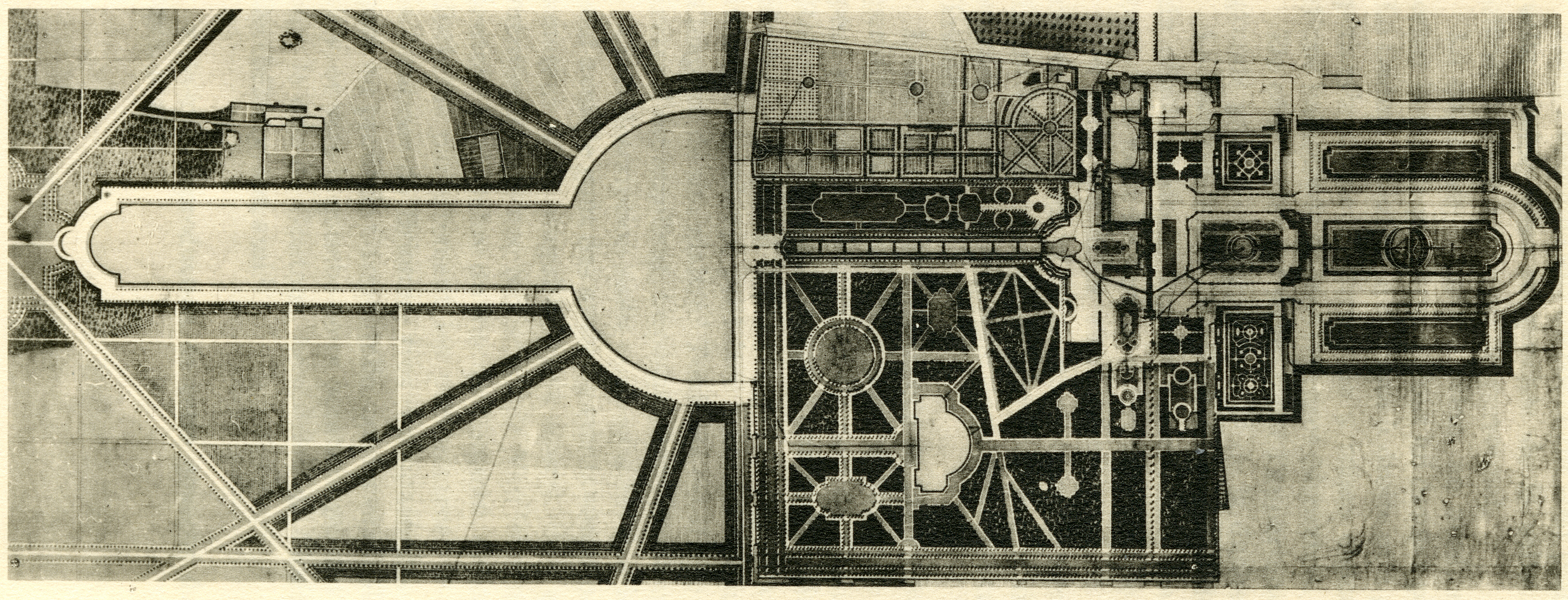
Site plan attributed to Louis-Denis Le Camus, c. 1770 (collection of Thierry André)
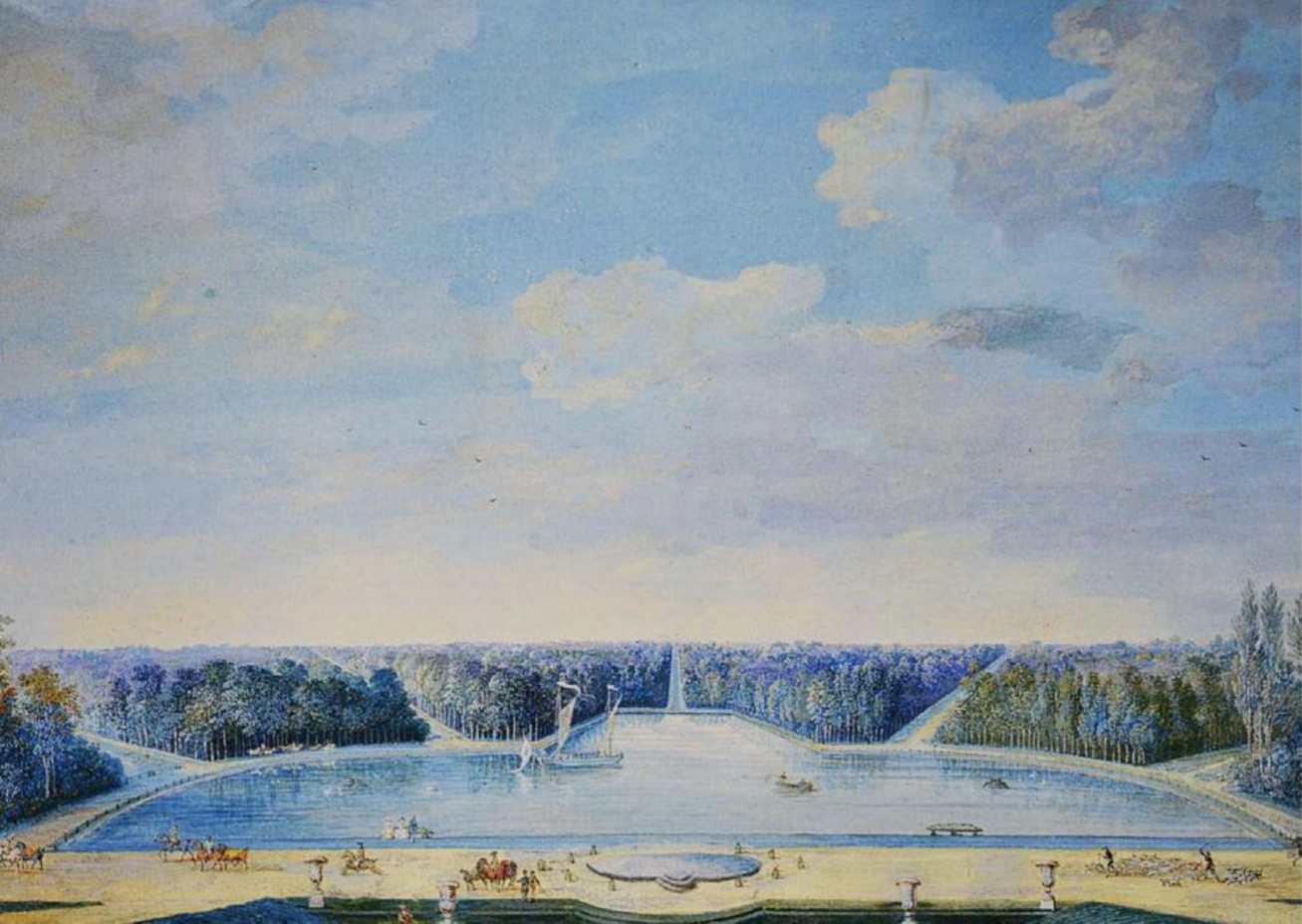
The lake and canal of Chanteloup (painting attributed to Louis-Nicolas Van Blarenberghe, Musée du Louvre)

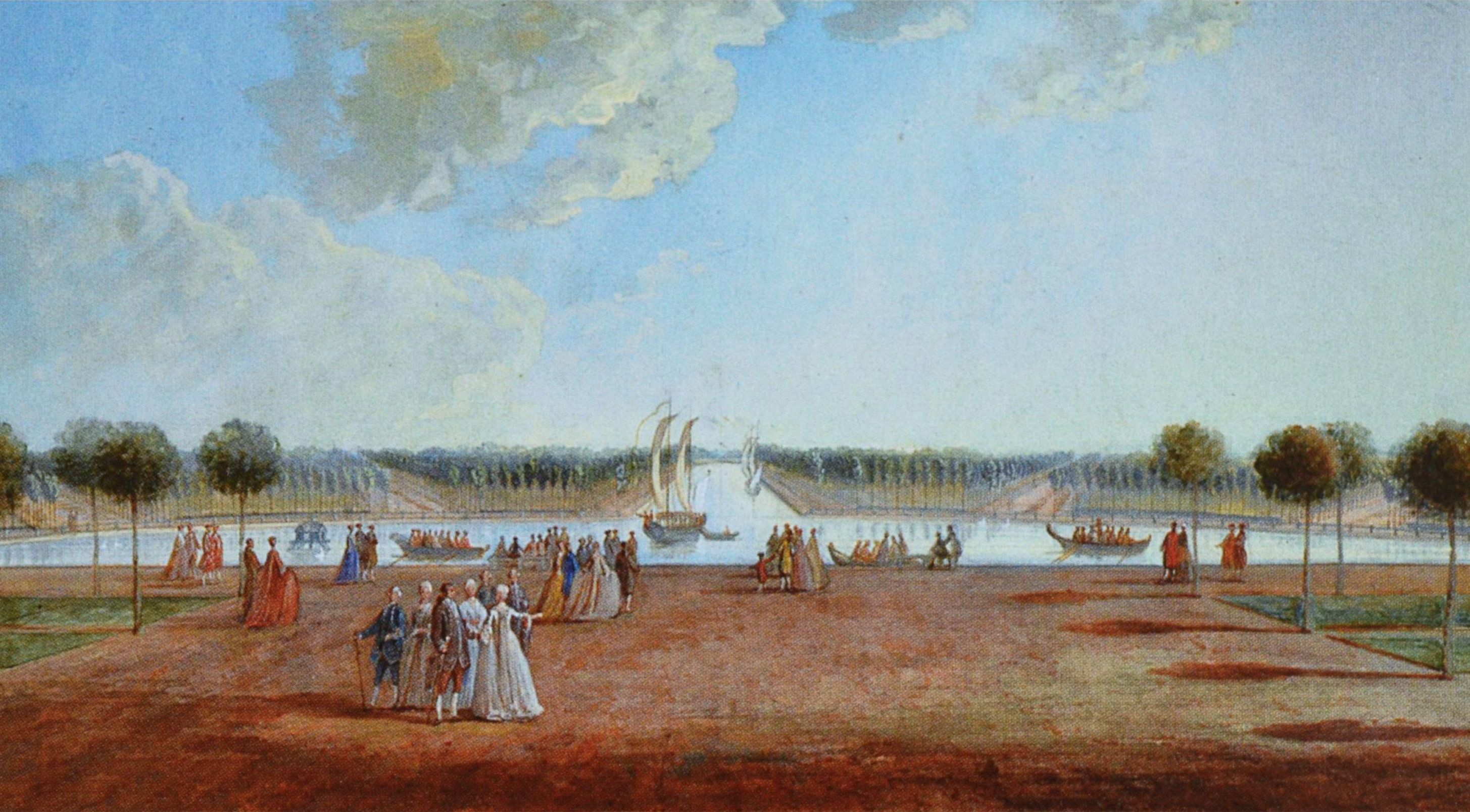
View of the canal and the patte d'oie (painting by Nicolas Perignon, private collection)

==== Colonnades on the cour d'honneur ====
Colonnades were an architectural feature that seemed to please Choiseul. Le Camus used them again to fill in the setback of one toise (about two yards) of the south facade of the corps de logis (facing the cour d'honneur) with a seven-bay colonnaded portico, including a central avant-corps of three bays with a wider set of steps (perron) leading down to the courtyard. The portico can be seen in a view of the south facade of the château taken from the middle of the cascade, painted around 1770 by Nicolas Perignon. In the center of the corps de logis, Le Camus created a large entrance hall, through which one could pass to reach the courtyard on the south, the cour d'honneur. To the left of the entrance hall was a series of three large rooms, and to its right a large dining room with windows facing north, rather than the cour d'honneur as before.

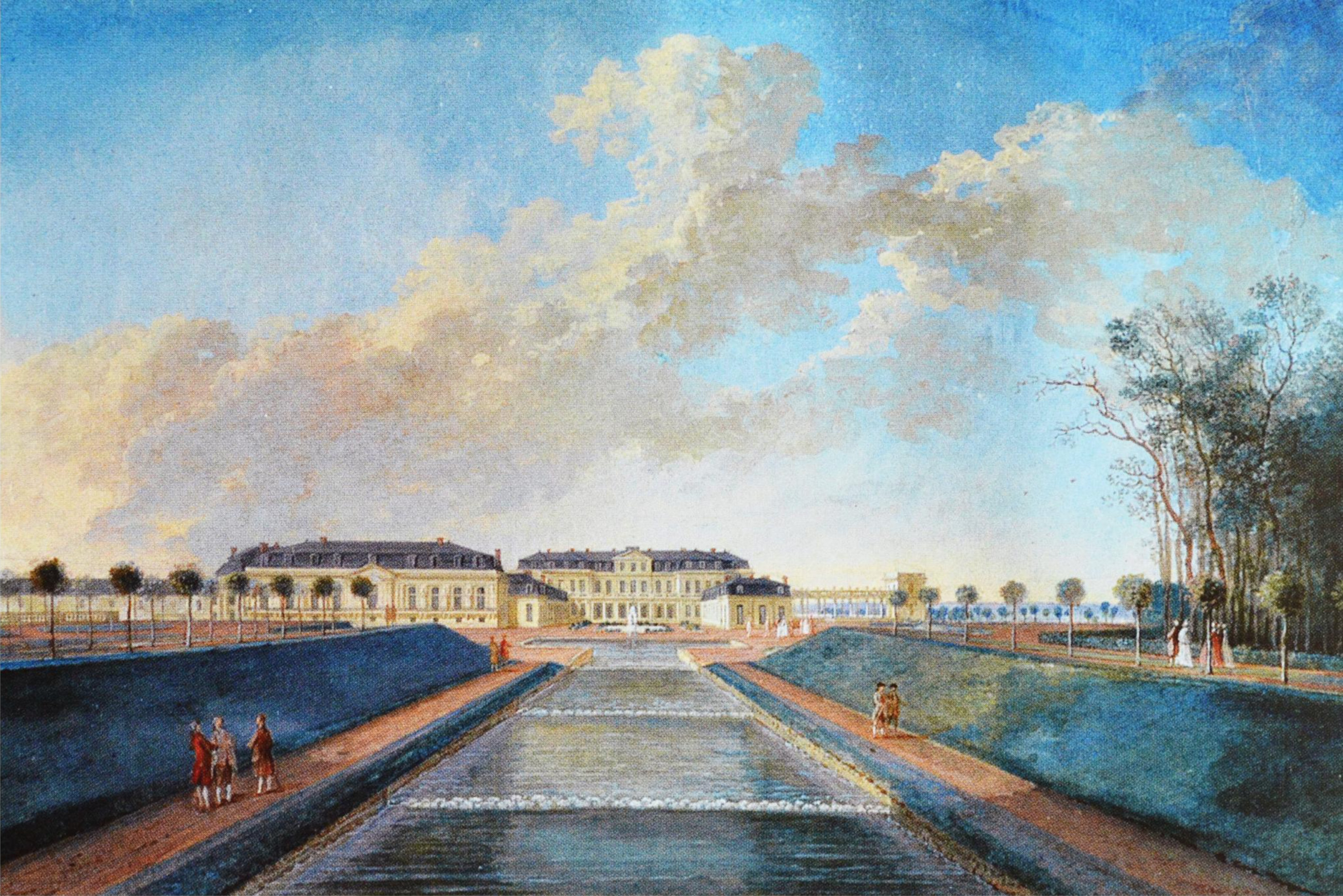
View of the south facade of the château from the middle of the cascade, showing the colonnaded portico topped with a balustraded terrace (painted c. 1770 by Nicolas Perignon)

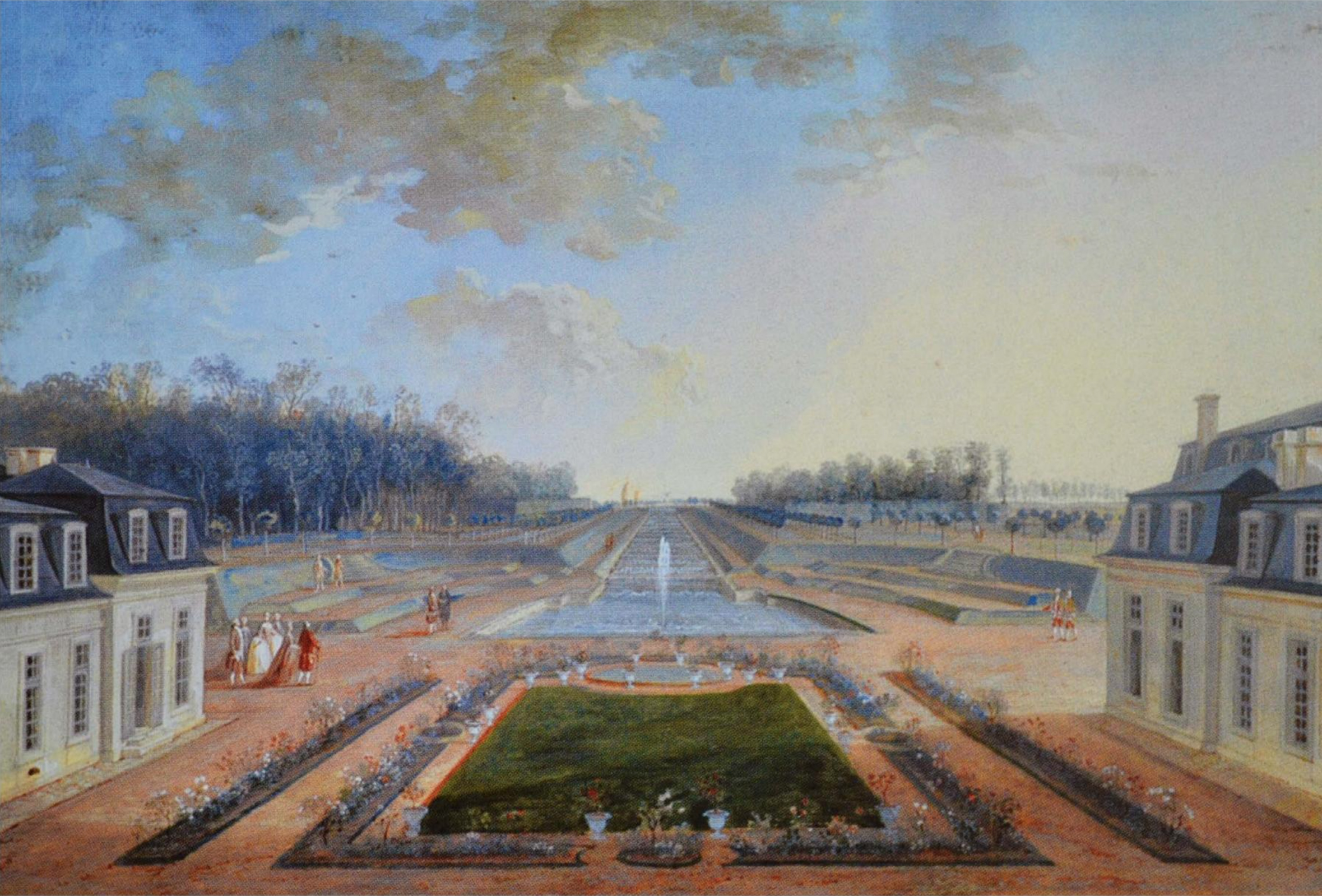
View of the parterre of the cour d'honneur, the pièce d'eau, and the garden cascade taken from the terrace above the south portico (painted c. 1770 by Nicolas Perignon)

Le Camus later added colonnades to two new pavilions extending and terminating the south ends of the lateral wings flanking the cour d'honneur. The one attached to the east wing contained a complete apartment, comprising an entrance foyer, antechamber, grand chamber (with windows facing east), and on the south, a boudoir, office (cabinet), closet (garde-robe), and a staircase leading to the floor above. This apartment was used by Choiseul's sister, the Duchess of Gramont, when she came to visit. The old part of the east wing contained the apartment for the duke, a large gallery, and the apartment for the duchess, Louise-Honorine Crozat, daughter of Louis-François Crozat, marquis du Châtel, and heir to many of the Italian paintings from the collection of her great-uncle, Pierre Crozat. Some of these paintings were displayed in the gallery. The matching pavilion attached to the west wing contained the apartment of the officier de bouche (chef), an office and a laundry. The old part of the west wing contained a new kitchen (closer to the main dining room), offices, and the servants' dining room.

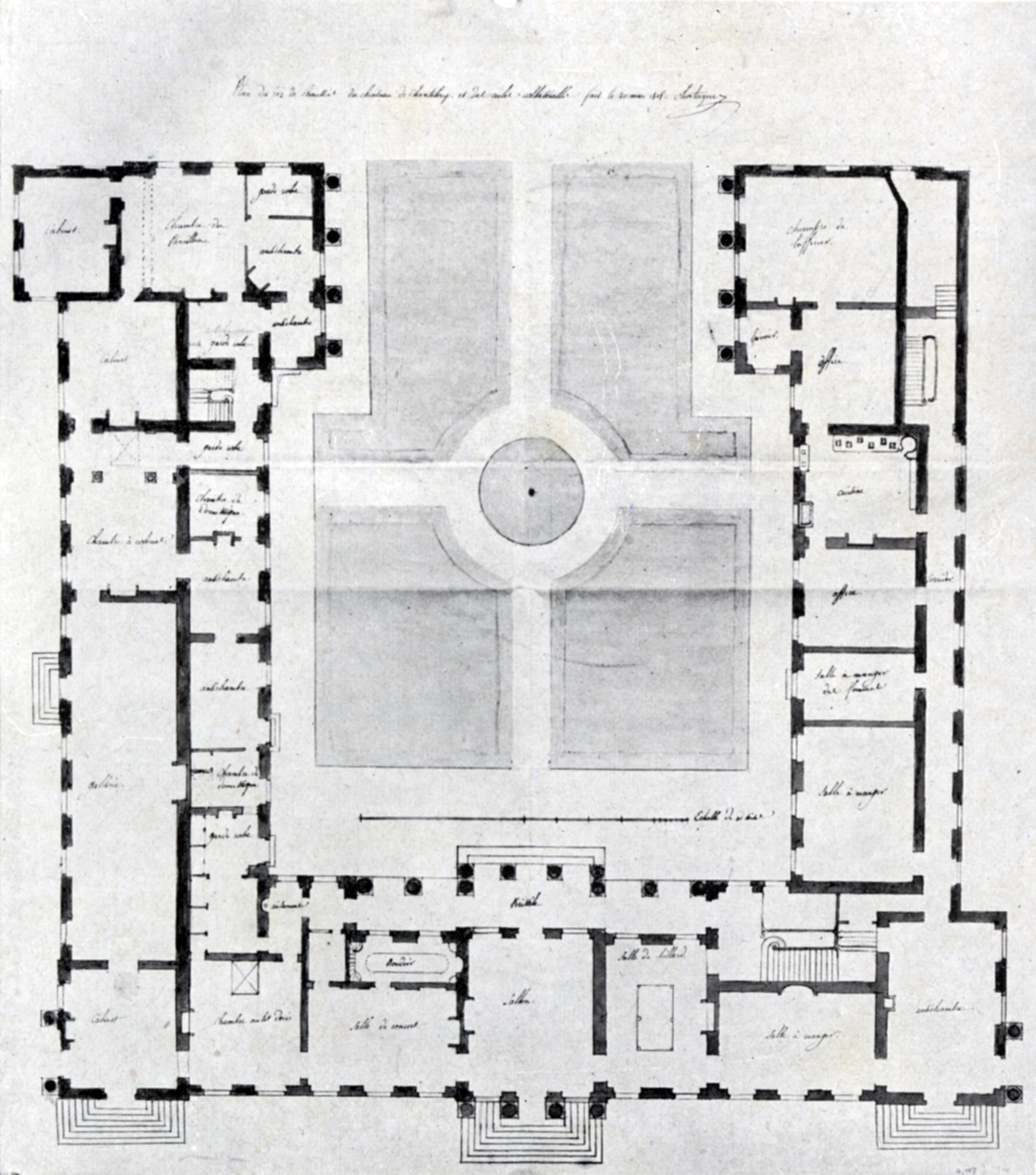
Plan of the ground floor of the Château de Chanteloup (north at the bottom) with the colonnades added by Louis-Denis Le Camus to the cour d'honneur

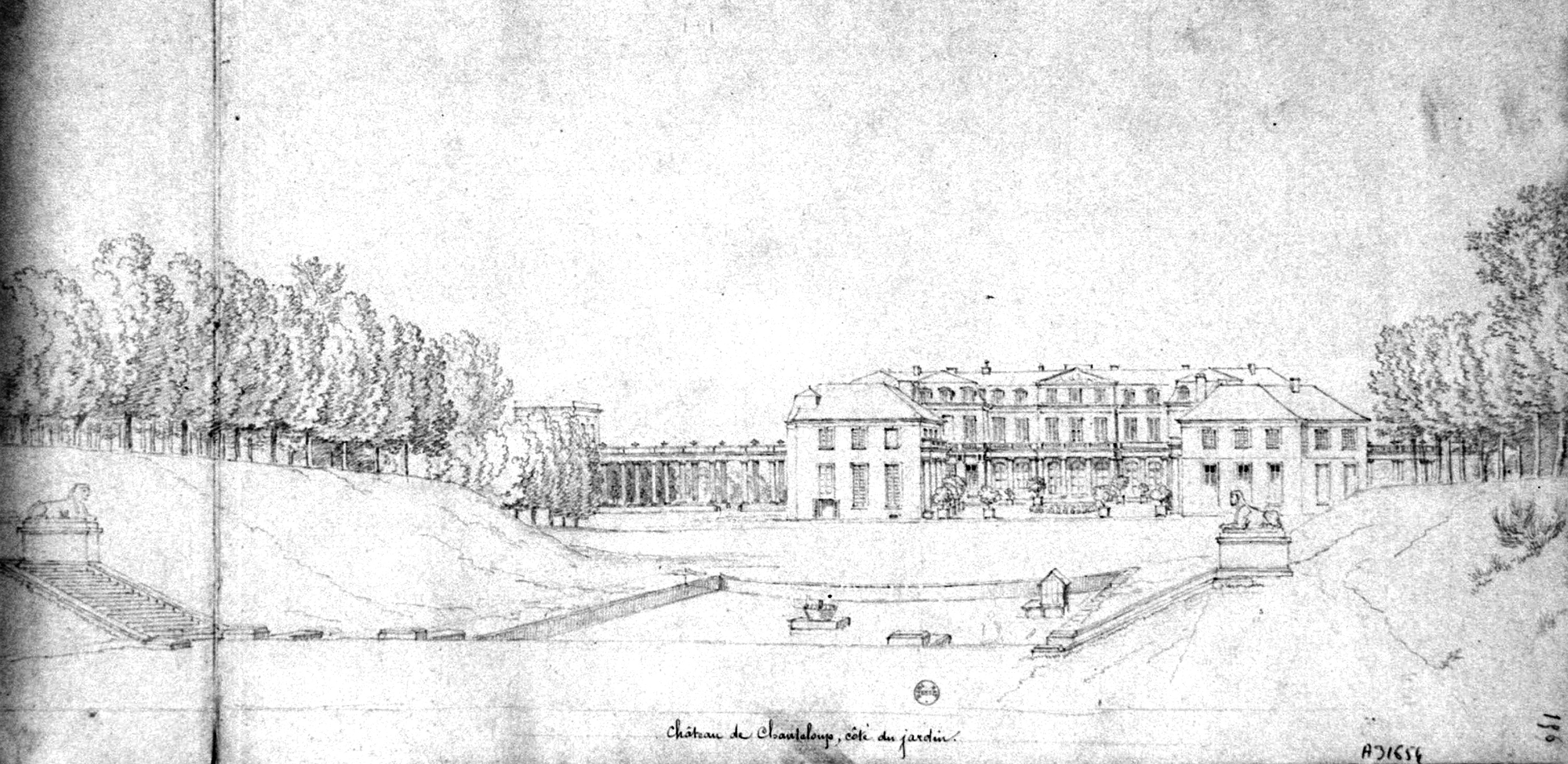
View of the south (garden) facade with the colonnades and pavilions added by Le Camus (undated drawing from the Bibliothèque nationale de France)

==== Jardin anglo-chinois and pagoda ====
In December 1770, Louis XV banished Choiseul from court and ordered him to retire to Chanteloup. Before returning to Paris in 1775, after the lifting of his exile by Louis XVI, Choiseul introduced a large, informal jardin anglo-chinois (replacing the French formal gardens east of the main axis of the château) and commissioned the construction of what is now the former château's most famous feature, the seven-storey, 44 metres (144 ft)-tall Pagoda of Chanteloup, built in 1775 by Le Camus. The pagoda was located just to the north of the demi-lune lake. The garden cascade flowing down to the pièce d'eau near the cour d'honneur was suppressed at this time and transformed into a bowling green (boulingrin), apparently due to a lack of sufficient water to keep it flowing.

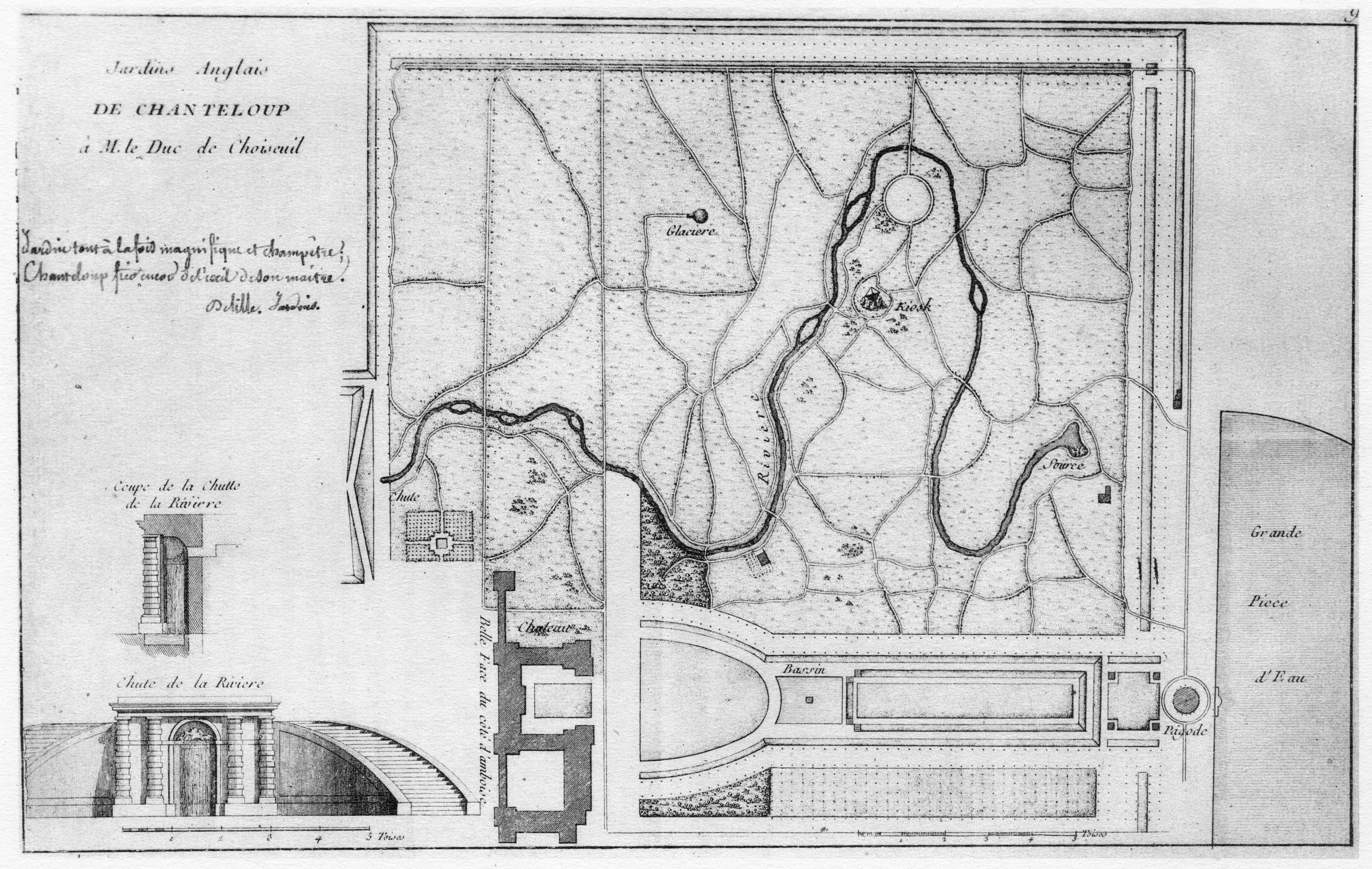
Site plan of the Chanteloup jardins anglais in 1775

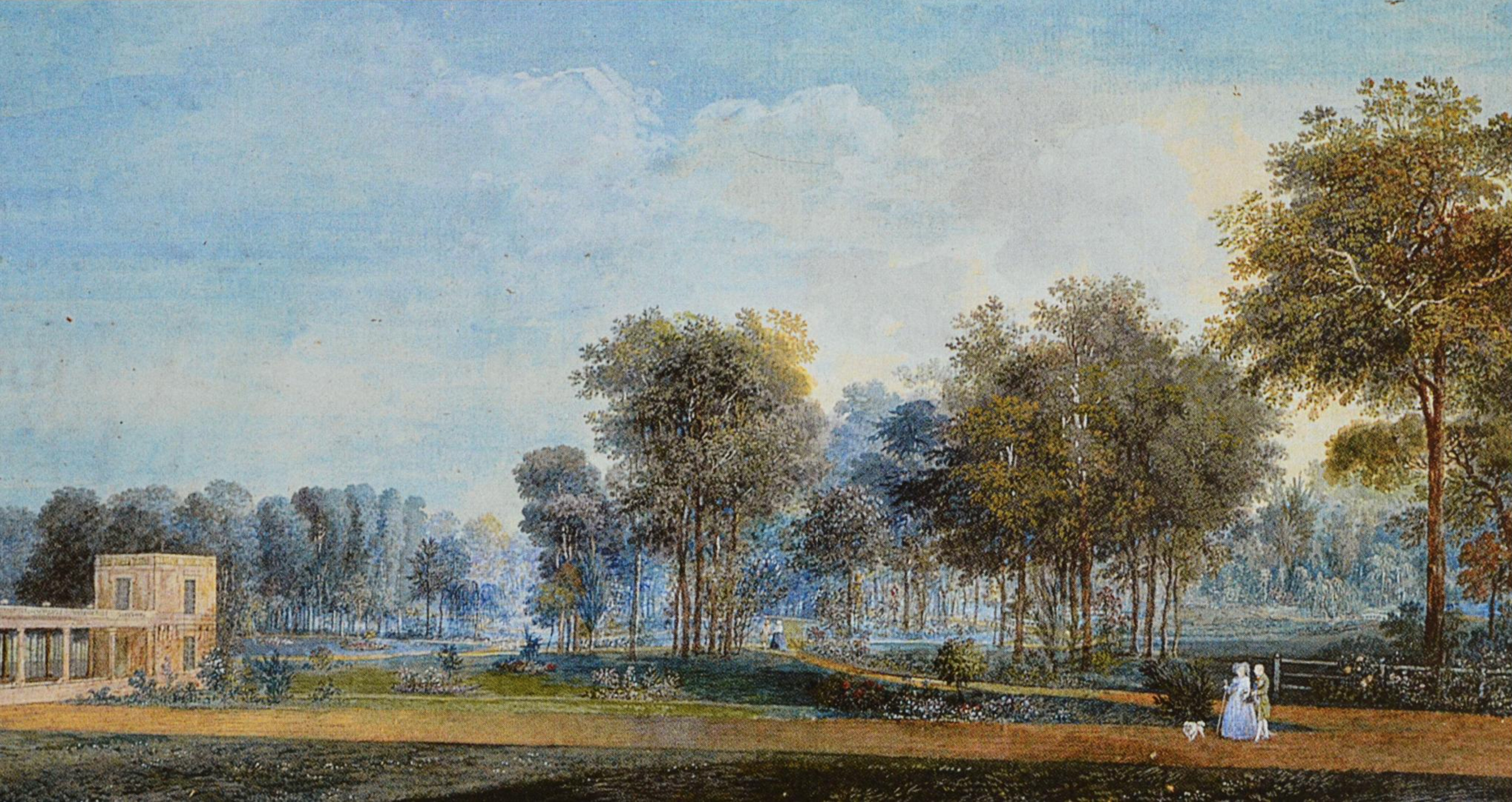
View to the east with the Bathing Pavilion and the edge of the jardin anglo-chinois (painting by Louis-Nicolas Van Blarenberghe)
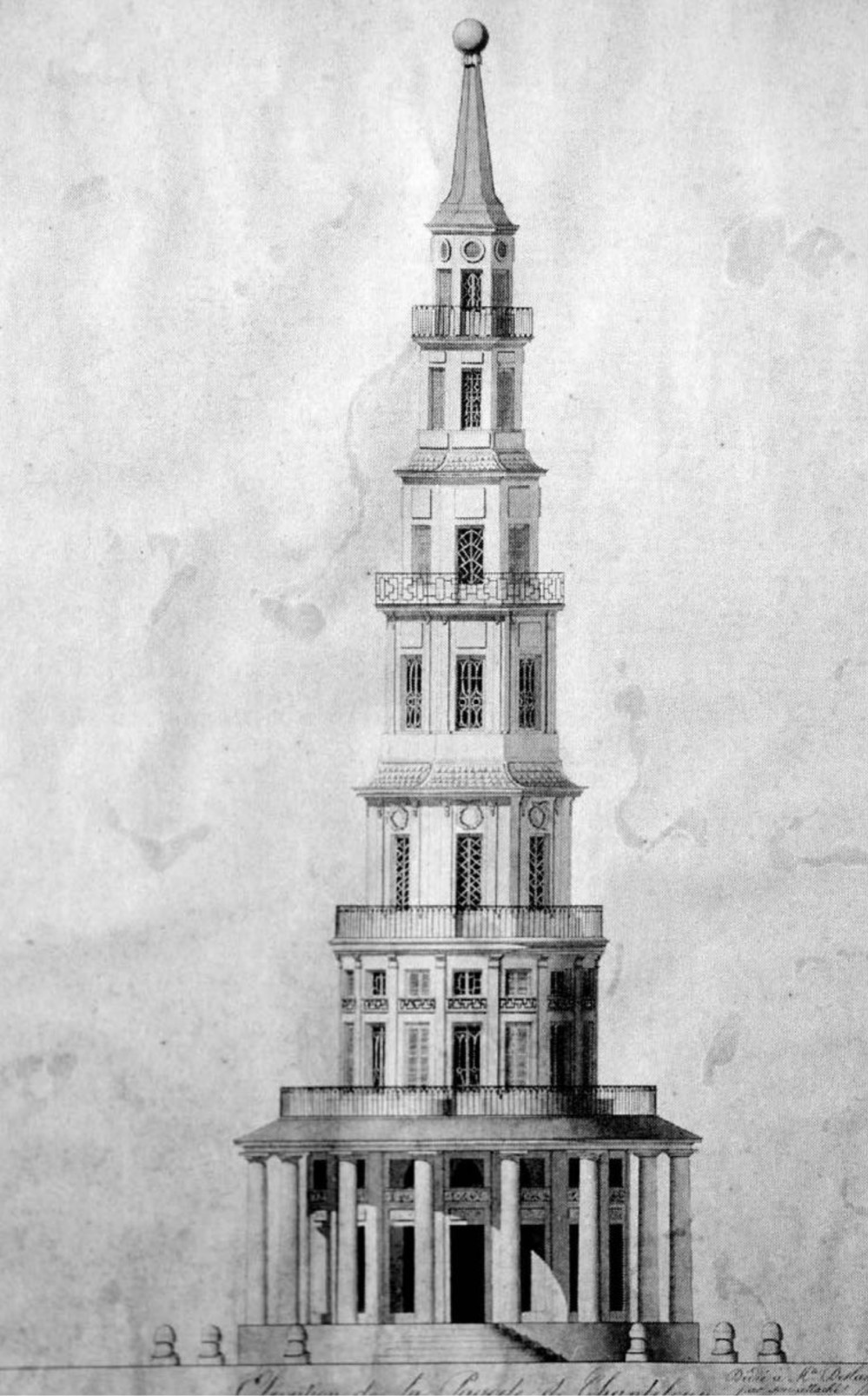
Elevation drawing of the pagoda

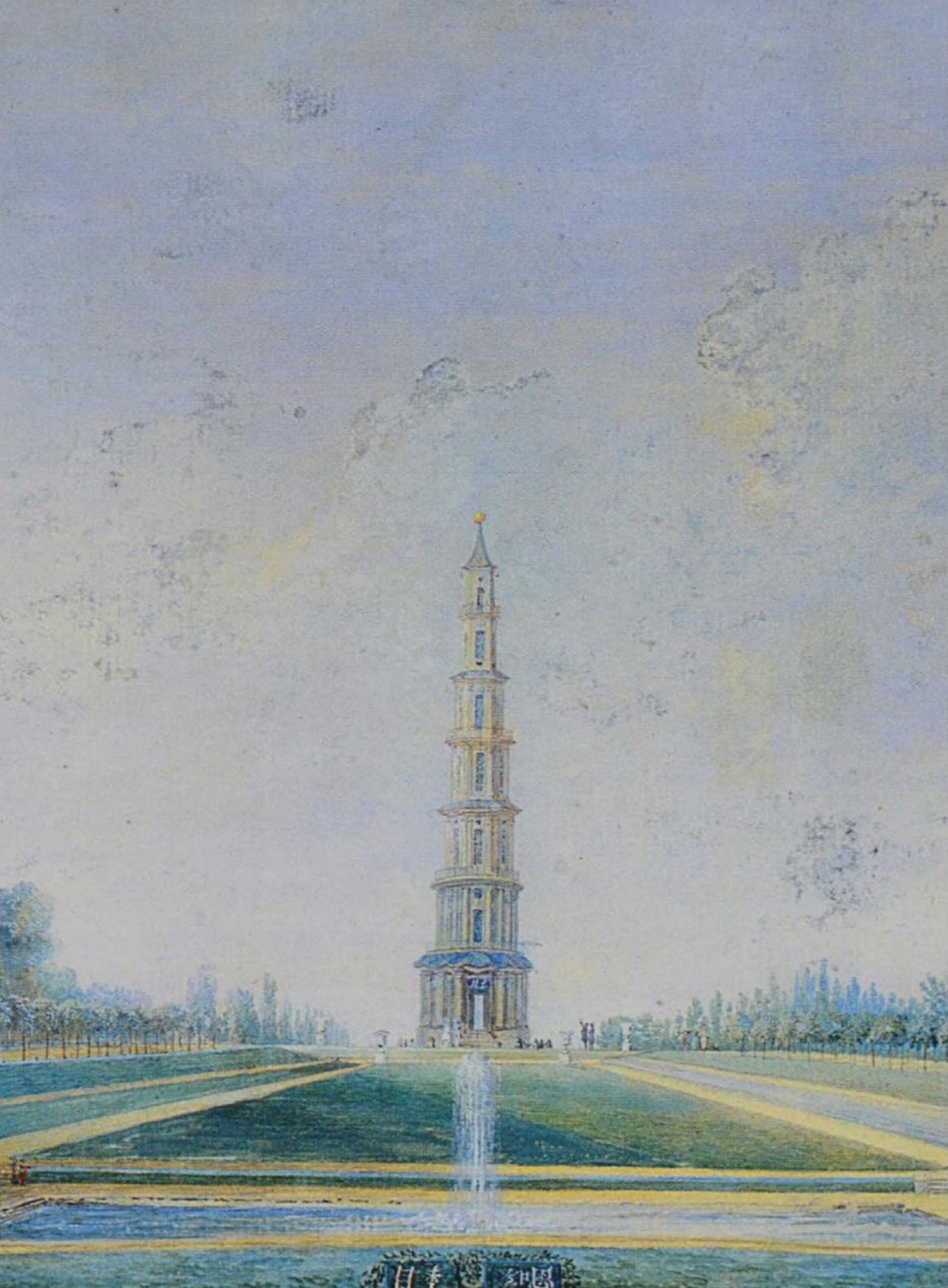
View of the pagoda (painting attributed to Louis-Nicolas Van Blarenberghe, Musée du Louvre)

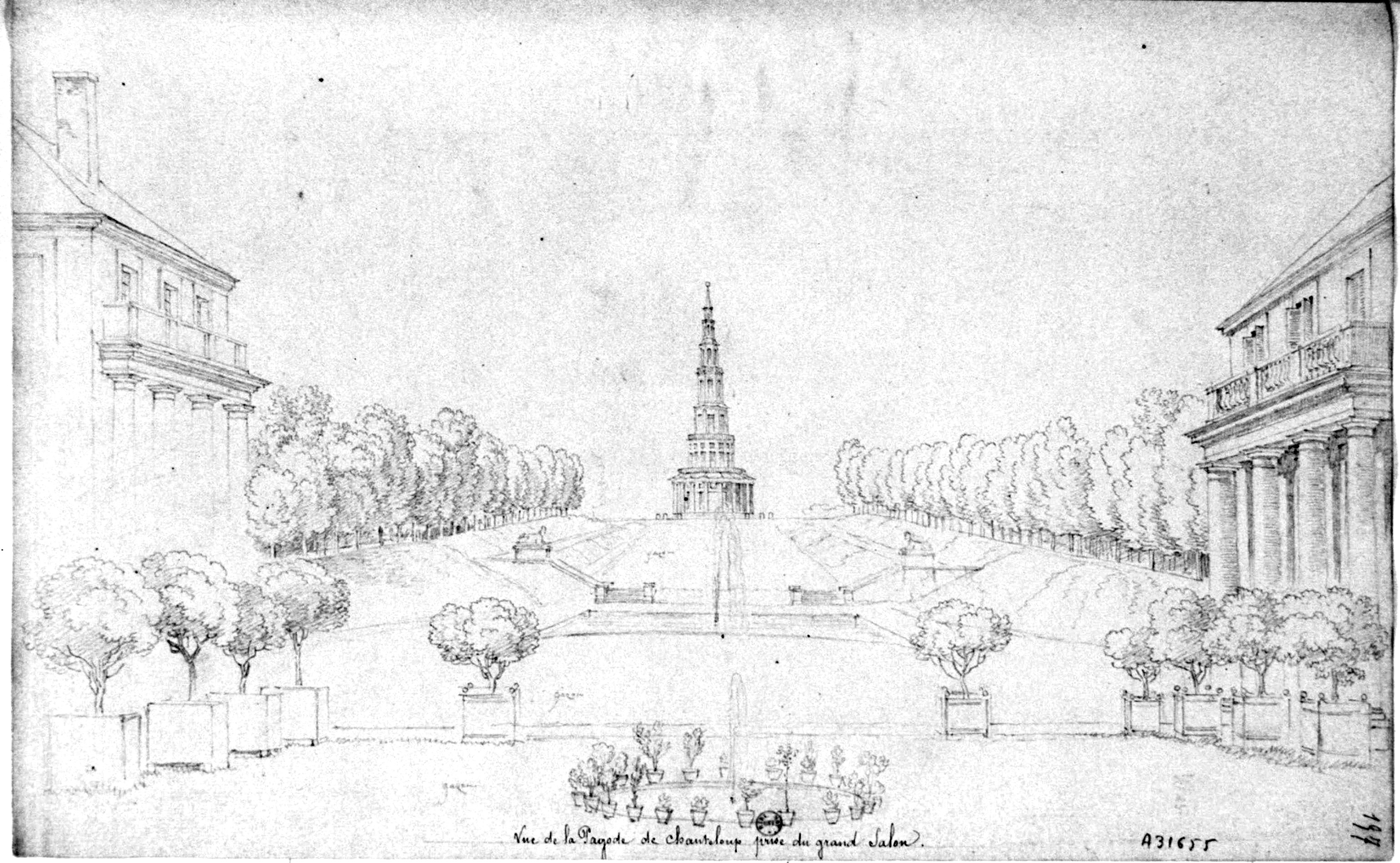
View of the pagoda from the grand salon of the château (undated drawing from the Bibliothèque nationale de France)

=== 1785–1823: Decline and demolition ===
After Choiseul's death in 1785 the château was purchased by the Duke of Penthièvre, who added to the collection of paintings, most notably works by François Boucher. The French Revolution began a period of decline, the property becoming a public good in 1797 and suffering abandonment until 1802, when it was bought by the chemist-industrialist Jean-Antoine Chaptal.

Chaptal, a rich man, was minister of the interior under Napoleon and became a member of the French Senate in 1804. He expended a considerable amount of money restoring the property and in 1808 declared "it was fit to receive a king." He raised sheep, distilled brandy, and experimented with beet farming and the large-scale production of beet sugar.

In order to pay heavy debts owed by his son from investments in the chemical industry, Chaptal decided to sell. The Duke of Orléans purchased the section of the park with the Pagoda, but declined to buy the entire domain. In 1823 Chaptal sold the remainder of the park and gardens and the château itself to a consortium of goods merchants, the "bande noire" ("black bandits"), including the socialist banker Barthélemy Prosper Enfantin and the speculator Baudrand, acting for the wealthy Alfred de Montesqiou-Fézensac. The group dismantled most of the château, dispersing architectural souvenirs throughout the Touraine, many of which can still be seen in public and private places.

=== 1823–present: Domaine de Chanteloup ===
Only some of the park, two pavilions, a semicircular ornamental pool, and a few other garden features survive, the most important of which is the Pagoda, restored in 1910 by architect René Édouard André (son of the landscape architect Édouard François André). The site, the Domaine de Chanteloup, was designated a French monument historique in 1937.

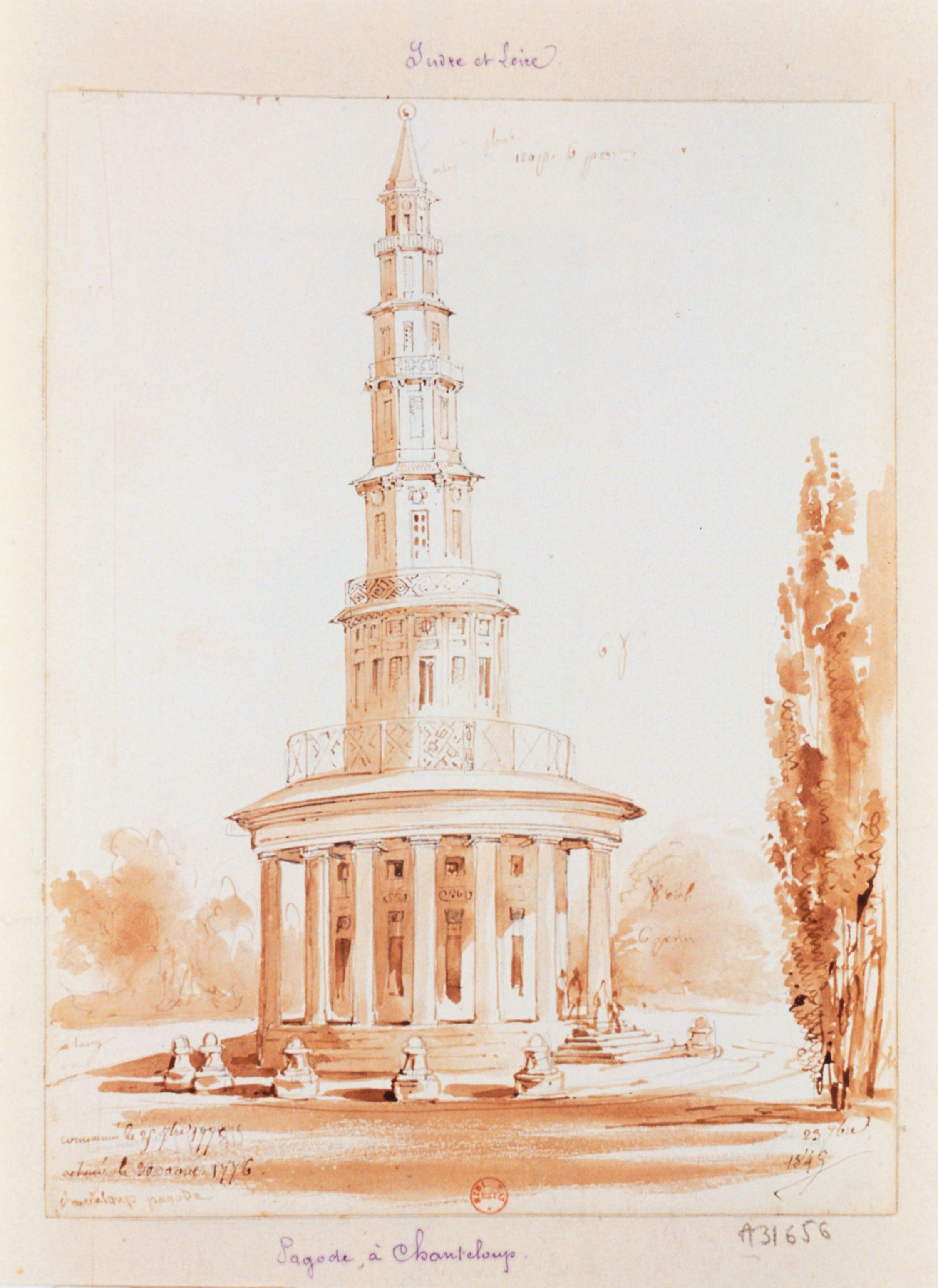
Pagoda of Chanteloup as sketched by Bergeron in 1845

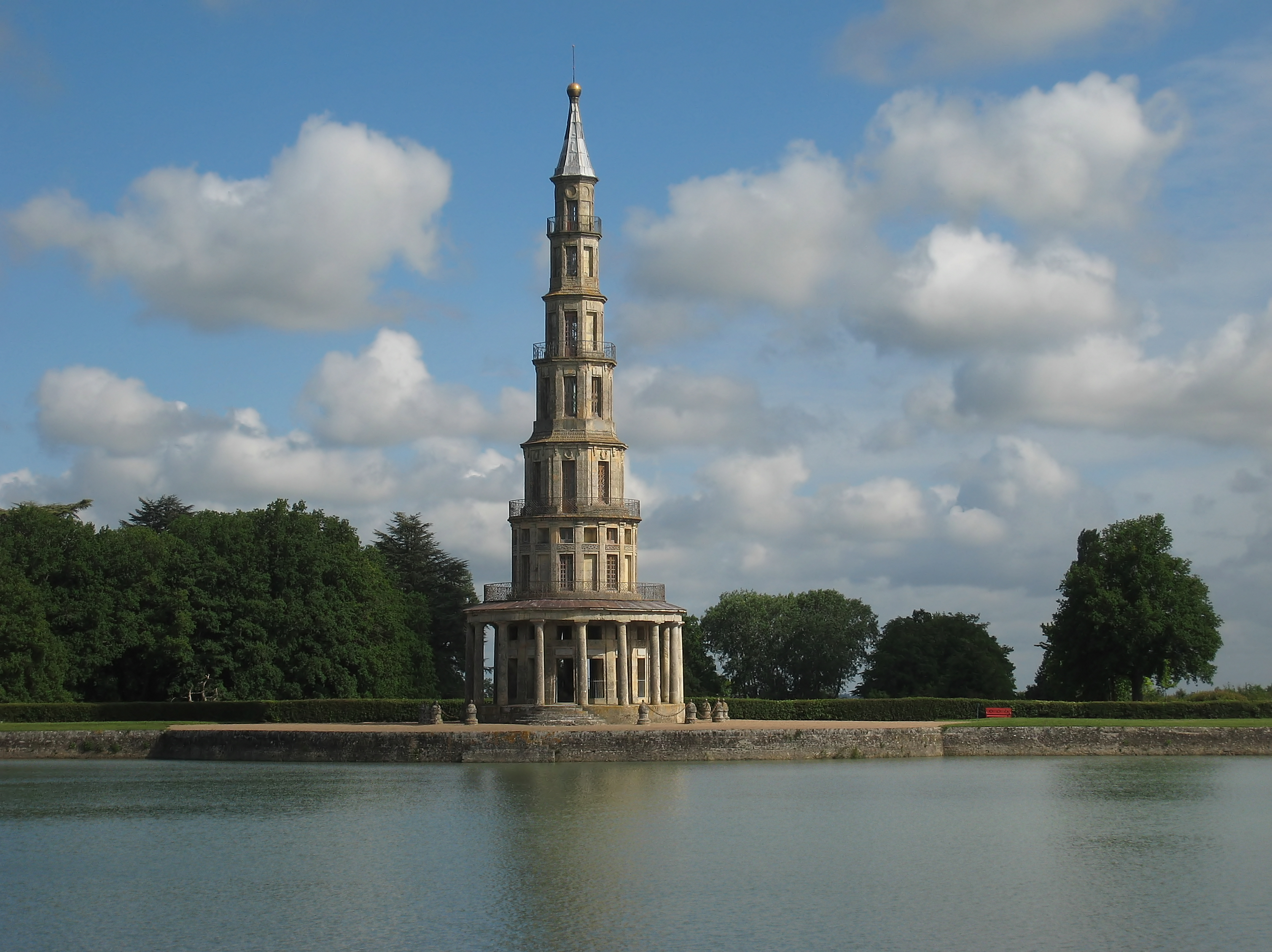
Pagoda of Chanteloup in 2007

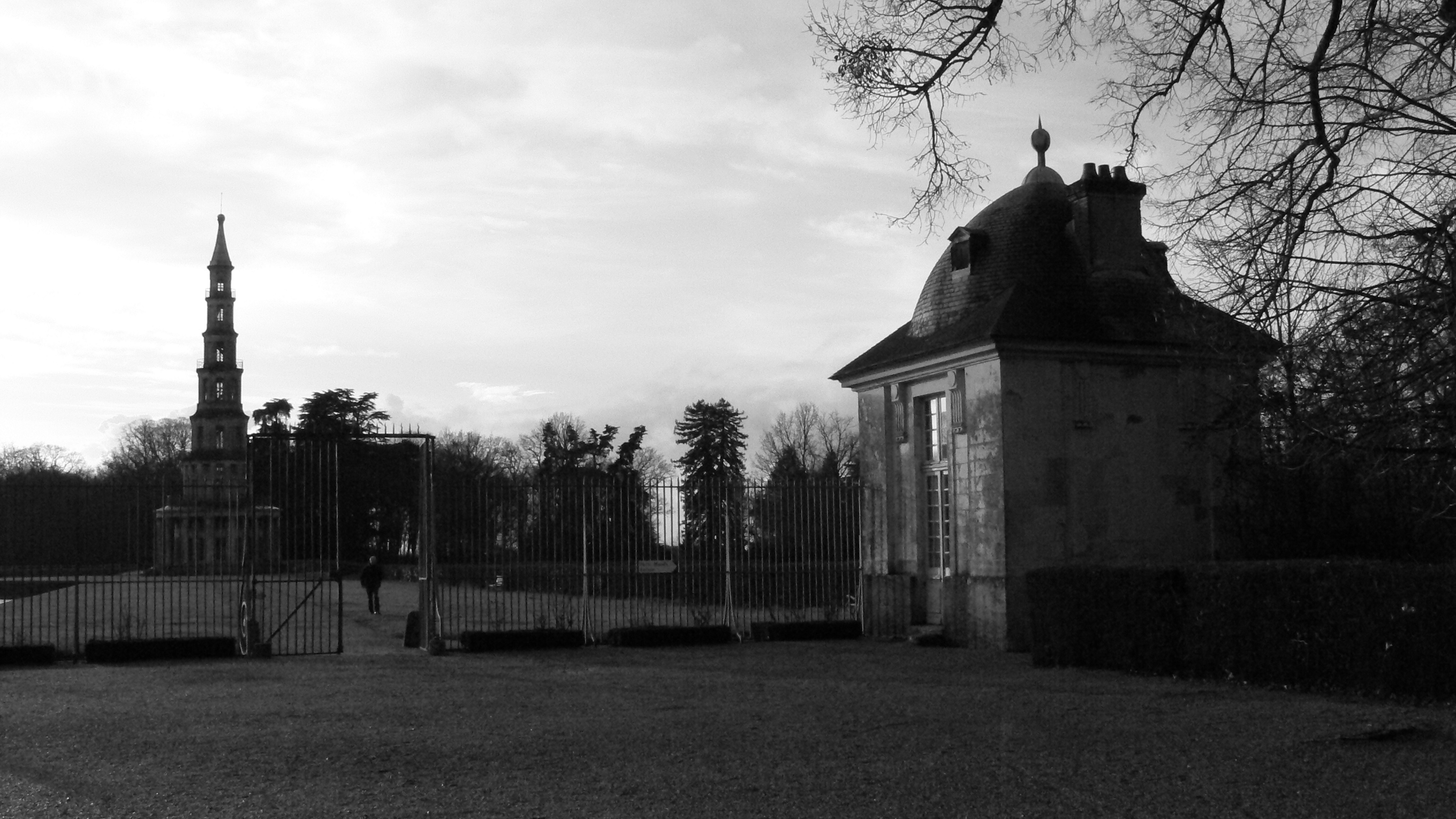
Pagoda and a pavilion

== Choiseul-Chanteloup snuffbox ==
The château and its gardens were depicted by Louis Nicolas van Blarenberghe in six miniatures (1767, Metropolitan Museum of Art, commissioned by the Duke of Choiseul), which were used to decorate a gold snuffbox. The paintings show the architectural composition as intended by Choiseul and his architect, rather than that which had actually been built.

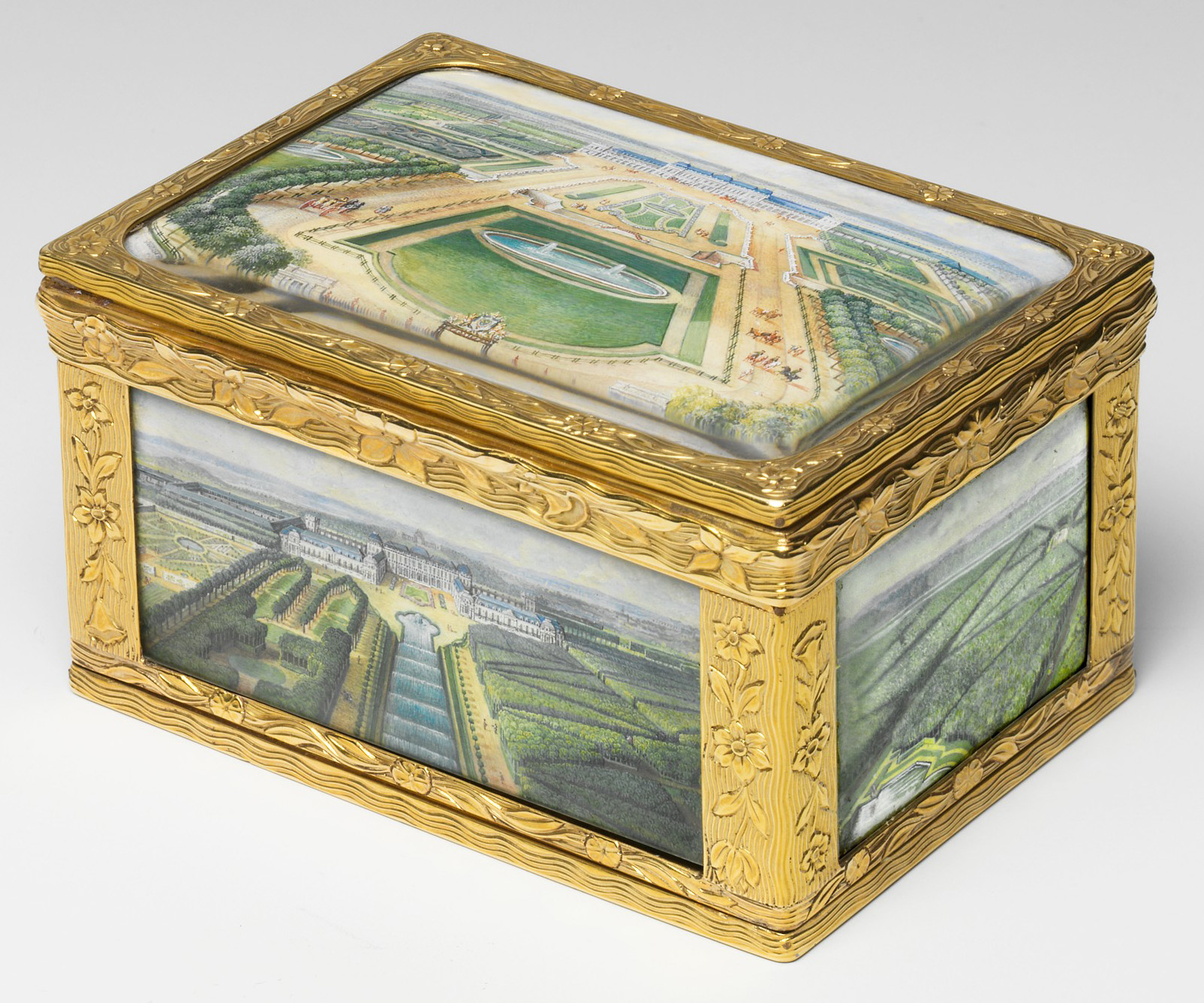
Choiseul-Chanteloup snuffbox (1767, Metropolitan Museum of Art)

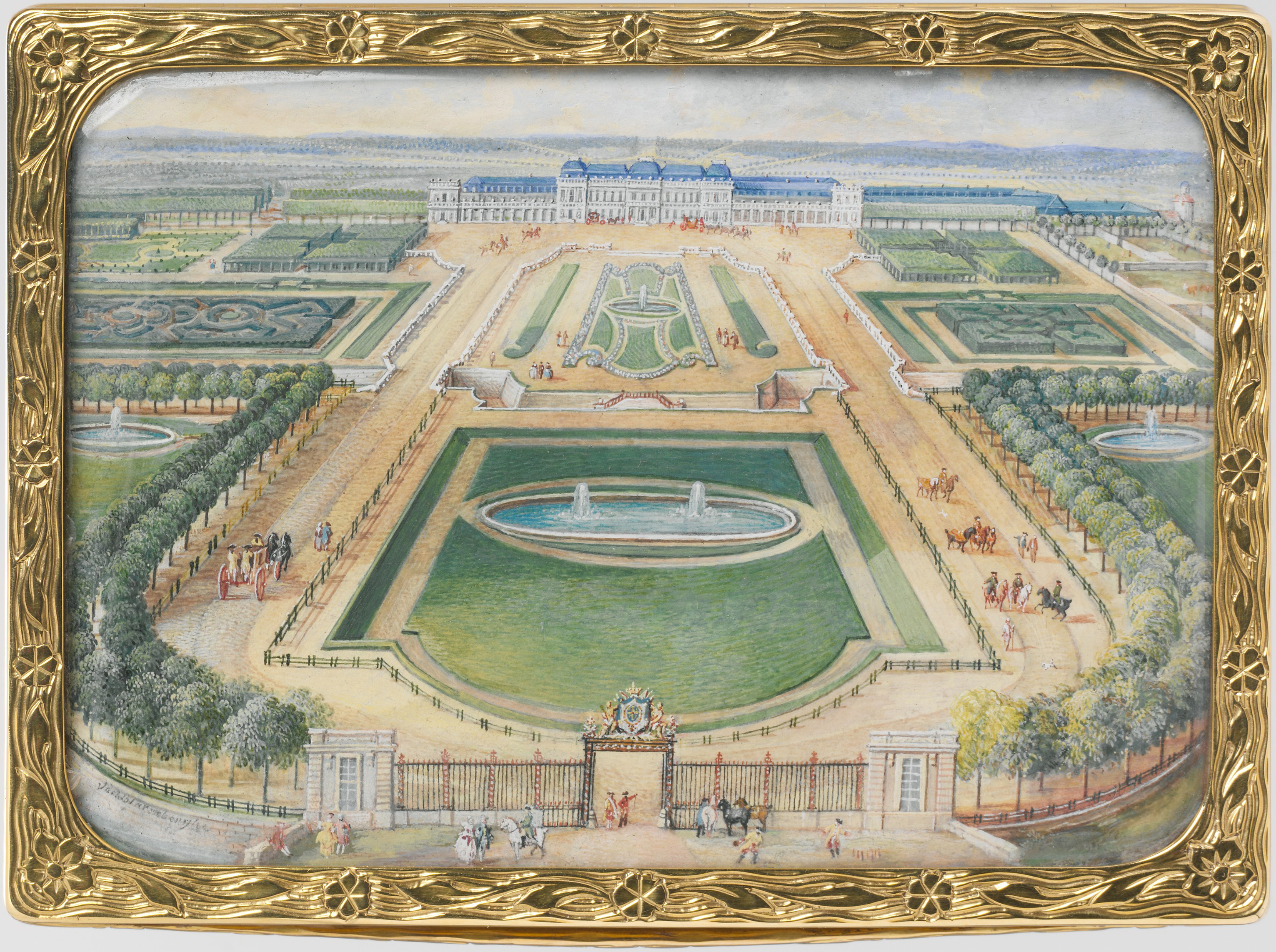
Northern view of the château from the entrance screen, the "Grille Dorée" (snuffbox top)

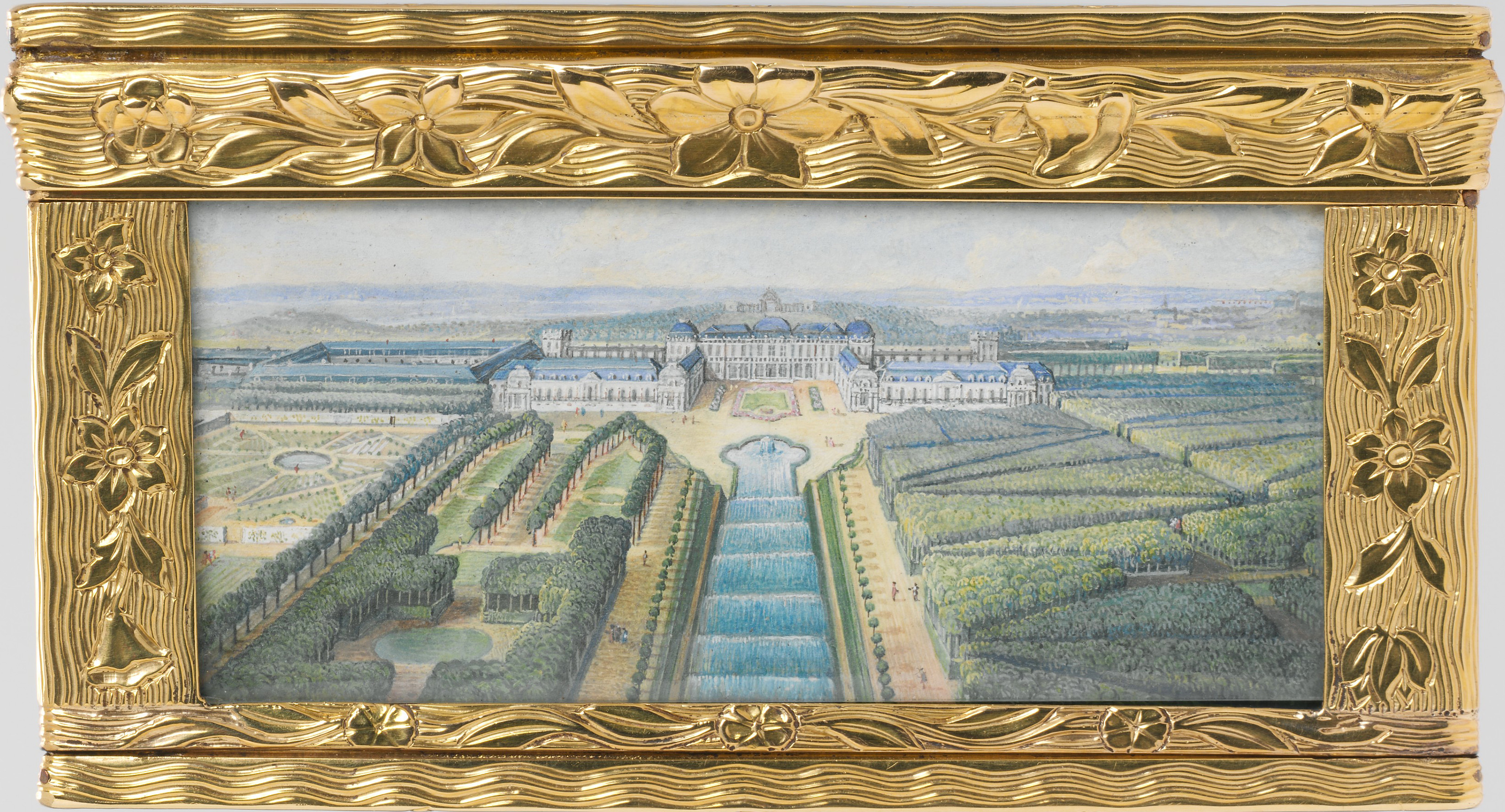
View of the garden facade from the south (snuffbox front)

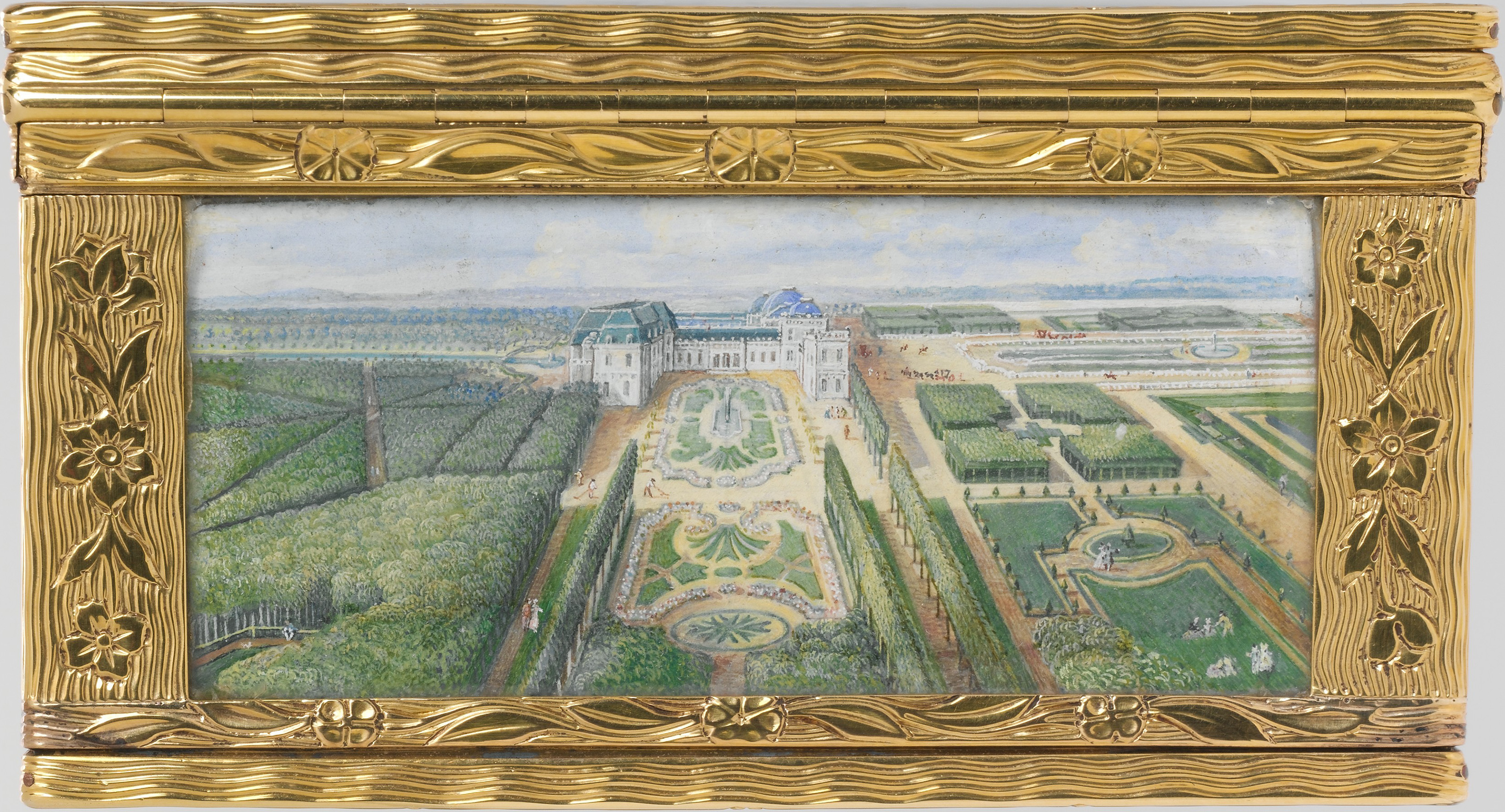
View of the château from the east (snuffbox back)

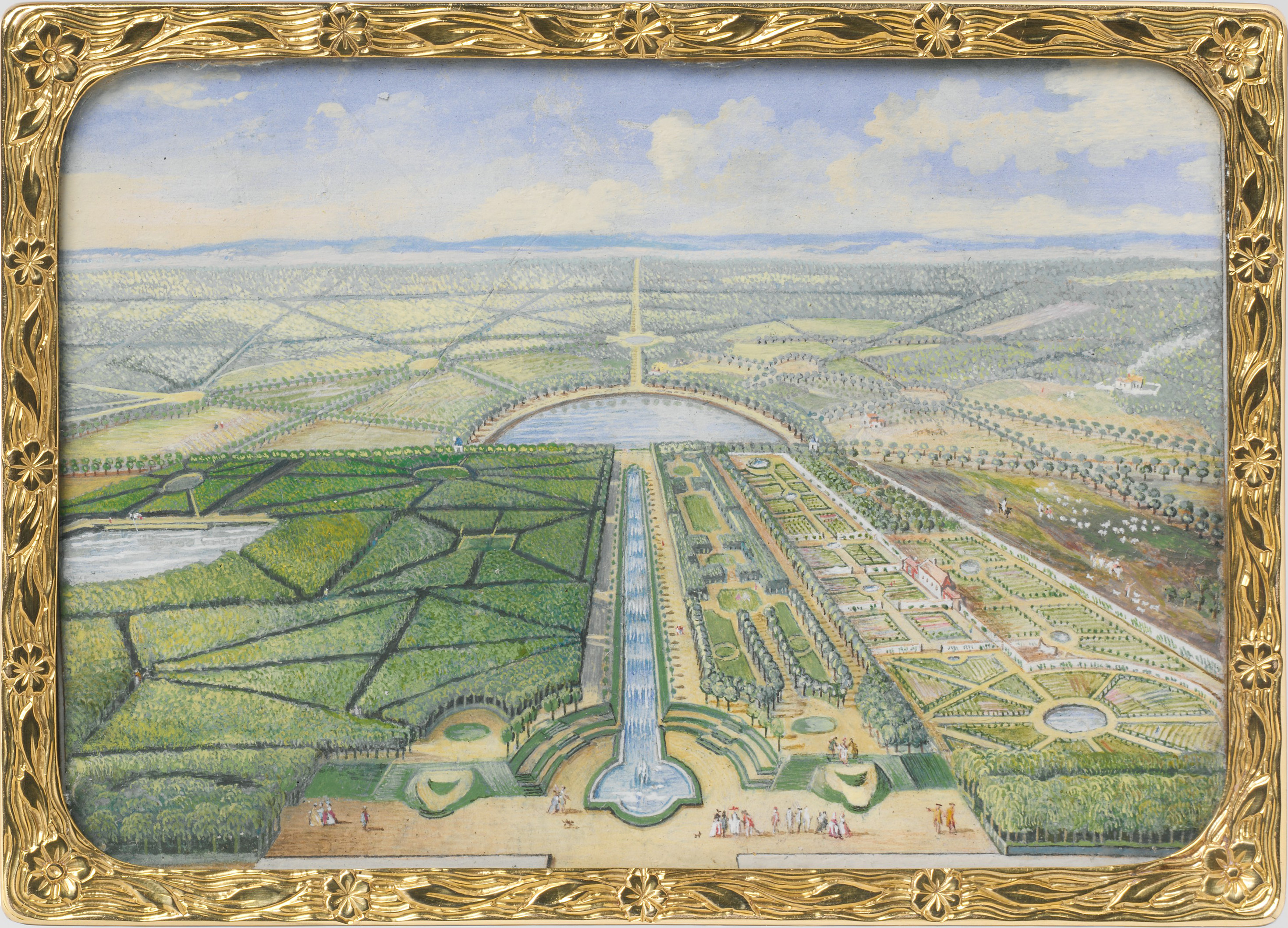
View from the château toward the south, showing the site of the future Pagoda of Chanteloup (1775) in front of the semicircular lake (snuffbox bottom)

== Bibliography ==
- André, R. Édouard (1928). "Le Domaine de Chanteloup", pp. 19–96, in Chanteloup by André Hallays, R. Édouard André, and Roland Engerand. Tours: Maison Alfred Mame et fils. OCLC 494077689.
- André, R. Édouard (1935). "Documents inédits sur l'histoire du château et des jardins de Chanteloup", pp. 31–35, in Bulletin de la Société de l'Histoire de l'Art Français, no. 1 (1 March 1935). ISSN 0301-4126.
- Carré de Busserrole, Jacques-Xavier (1879). Dictionnaire géographique historique et biographique d'Indre-et-Loire et de l'ancienne province de Touraine, volume 2. Tours: Imprimérie Rouillé-Ladevèze. Copy at Google Books.
- Chenu, Rachel; Stainier, Lauranne (2015). Les vases des jardins de Versailles à Chanteloup, Master Histoire de l'art, François Rabelais University, Tours. Online pdf at ash.univ-tours.fr.
- Conisbee, Philip (1996). "Hoüel, Jean-Pierre-Louis-Laurent", vol. 14, p. 799, in The Dictionary of Art, edited by Jane Turner, reprinted with minor corrections in 1998. New York: Grove. ISBN 9781884446009. Also at Oxford Art Online (subscription required).
- Crosland, M. P. (2008). "Chaptal, Jean Antoine", Complete Dictionary of Scientific Biography. Charles Scribner's Sons. Archived copy (13 December 2017) at the archive.org.
- Gallet, Michel (1995). Les Architectes parisiens du XVIIIe siècle. Paris: Mengès. ISBN 9782856203705.
- Grateau, Alexandre (2015). De la Pagode de Chanteloup à Chanteloup, travail personnel de fin d'études. Ècole nationale supérieure d'architecture et du Paysage de Bordeaux.
- Hoog, Simone (1996). "Versailles", vol. 32, pp. 369–374, in The Dictionary of Art. New York: Grove. ISBN 9781884446009. Also at Oxford Art Online (subscription required).
- Holmes, Caroline (2008). Follies of Europe: Architectural Extravaganzas. Suffolk: Garden Art Press. ISBN 9781870673563.
- John, Richard (1996). "Le Camus, Louis-Denis", vol. 19, p. 26, in The Dictionary of Art, edited by Jane Turner, reprinted with minor corrections in 1998. New York: Grove. ISBN 9781884446009. Also at Oxford Art Online (subscription required).
- MBA Tours (2007). Chanteloup, un moment de grâce autour du duc de Choiseul, press release for the exhibition held from 7 April to 8 July 2007, Musée des Beaux-Arts, Tours. Online copy at the museum website.
- Moreau, Véronique (2008). "Les jardins du duc de Choiseul à Chanteloup", Colloque l’Esprit des jardins : entre tradition et création, 5–6 September 2008, Conseil Général d'Indre-et-Loire. Online copy.
- Neuman, Robert (1994). Robert de Cotte and the Perfection of Architecture in Eighteenth-Century France. Chicago/London: The University of Chicago Press. ISBN 9780226574370.
- Saint-Simon, Louis de Rouvroy, duc de (1857). The Memoirs of the Duke of Saint-Simon on the Reign of Louis XIV and the Regency, translated and abridged from the French by Bayle St. John, volume 3. London: Chapman & Hall. Copy at Google Books.
- Smentek, Kristel (2019). "A Prospect of China in Eighteenth-Century France: The Pagoda at Chanteloup," Thresholds, no. 47 (2019), pp. 161–175 doi:10.1162/thld_a_00683. JSTOR 48768950.
- Sotheby's (2007). La bataille d’Almança or La bataille de Villaviciosa, Sotheby's Old Master and 19th Century Drawings and Paintings, Paris, 19 June 2007.
- Watson, F. J. B. (1966). "Choiseul Boxes", pp. 141–158, reprint from Eighteenth Century Gold Boxes of Europe, edited by A. Kenneth Snowman. Boston Book and Art Shop. ISBN 9780571068005.
